= 1945 Auckland Rugby League season =

The 1945 Auckland Rugby League season was its 37th. Ōtāhuhu Rovers achieved several milestones in the 1945 season. They won the Rukutai Shield for the second time but the first as a stand-alone club with their win in 1942 season coming as a combined side with City Rovers due to senior teams being depleted by the war effort. They won it by earning the most competition points during the first round. Ōtāhuhu went on to win the minor championship for the first time when they finished 1 competition point ahead of the Richmond Rovers. In a somewhat confusing format the top 4 teams then played off for the major championship. Ōtāhuhu were defeated in the semi final by Ponsonby United, who then lost the final to Richmond. The league then declared that Ōtāhuhu as minor champions and Richmond as 'major' champions should play off to find the major champion for the season. Ōtāhuhu won 11–5 to become the official senior club champion for the 1945 season. At a meeting on September 26 several delegates "expressed the opinion that the minor and major competitions had been a muddle and more consideration should be given to them next season". With chairman Watson saying a conference would be arranged for a "more definite policy after consultations with all senior clubs". The Dickson medal for the most sportsmanlike player was awarded to Jim Fogarty of the Ōtāhuhu side, while V. Fredatovich won the same for the City 3rd grade team. Brian Nordgren set a record for the most number of points scored in a season in all games and was presented with a silver cup. At the same time Colin Riley (Ōtāhuhu) was presented with the Painter Trophy for the most successful goal kicker.

In representative competition matches Auckland had two wins over South Auckland (Waikato), another over West Coast, and two against Wellington. Auckland Māori lost to Huntly District at Davies Park in Huntly, while they also went down to Auckland Pākehā at Carlaw Park. Auckland had a strong representation in the North Island side as always in their inter-island match with South Island with 11 players selected for the team which won 18–8.

Preceded by 1944	37th Auckland Rugby League season 1945	Succeeded by 1946

== News ==
=== Annual Meeting ===
==== Annual report ====
Days prior to the Auckland Rugby League annual meeting their annual report of the previous [1944] season was released. The Auckland Star reported "after a 1944 season which is officially described as a trail of wet Saturdays, the Auckland Rugby League finished with a record revenue of £5295, an increase of £975 on the 1943 season. The thirty-fifth annual report, which will be presented at the annual meeting, states that following a deputation and conference with the Senior Officers' Association, the Board of Control decided as a trial for the 1945 season that the senior competition be played on a minor and major scheme, which will allow more Saturdays for the playing of representative football. The report states that the working expenses show an increase of £477 over the previous year. The amount paid to clubs and for the benefit of players for the past two years, with the figures for 1943 in parentheses are; Grants to clubs, £772 (£474); insurance to players, £172 (£180); injured players, £236 (£256); total, £1180 (£910). Principal revenue items are:- Grandstand receipts, £679; gates, £3539; revenue from two minor representative games totalled £465, ground rents, £186; representative matches, £455. The total assets are £11,667 and liabilities £1542. Investments in war loans amount to £1690. The report mentions that the Junior Control Board conducted a full schedule of grade championships, but a difficulty was experiences in getting sufficient playing grounds. The trustees of the Injured Players' Fund dealt with a large number of cases during the season. Since the inauguration of the fund over £2000 has been paid to disabled players.

==== Annual General Meeting ====
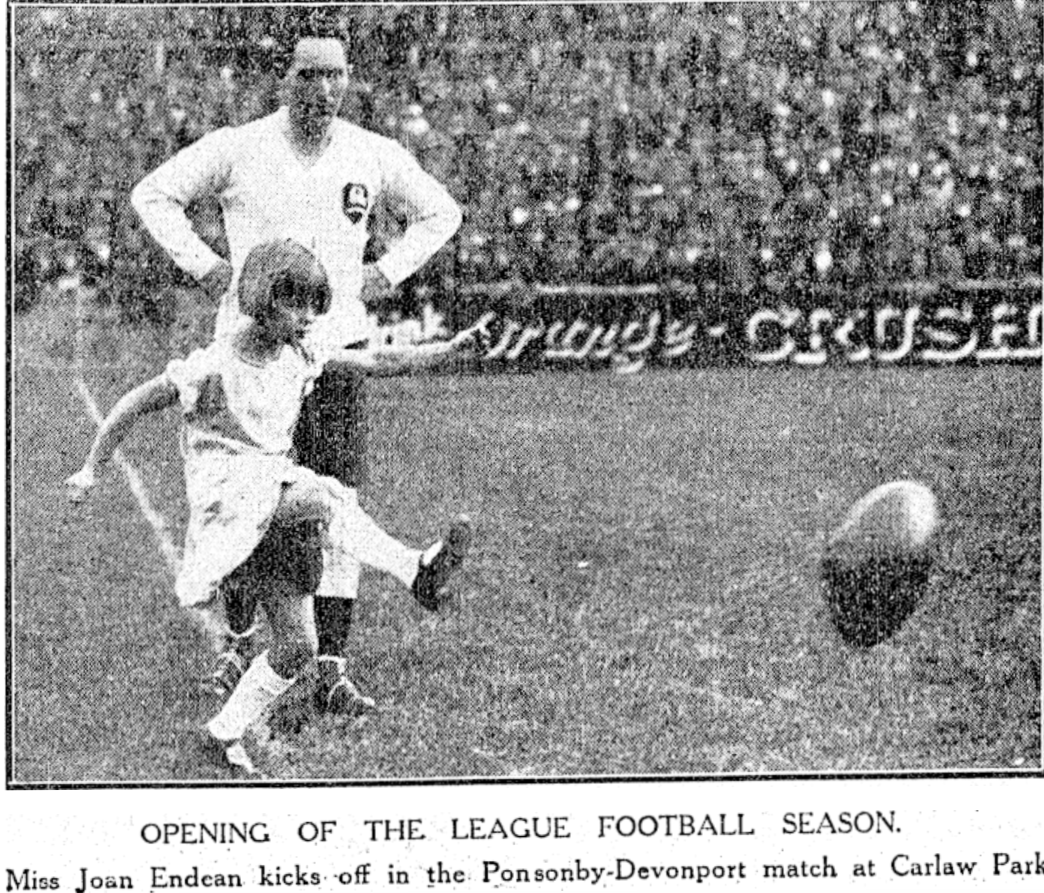
William Mincham, the referees delegate to the ARL board. He was a referee from 1920 to 1940 including test matches.

The 35th Annual General Meeting was held on Wednesday, March 28 at 7.45pm in the League Rooms in the Chamber of Commerce Building, Courthouse Lane. The honorary secretary prior to the meeting was Ivan Culpan. At the annual meeting the president, Mr. J.F.W. Dickson said "there was a splendid response from the Auckland public, and the past season was one to be proud of". He also paid tribute to the work of the former president, the late Mr. George Grey Campbell. Chairman of the Board of Control, Mr. J.W. Watson said "that there was a feeling of great satisfaction over a record past season. The teams had given the public the class of football that was needed, and great credit was due to the club members, players and officials. The Junior Control Board had functioned well, and for schoolboy football. The league owed a lot to the people who took an interest in the schoolboys. The standard of play had been good, and there was every reason to anticipate a successful coming season". Watson then went on to discuss the shortage of playing grounds, commenting that "there had been short-sightedness on the part of the local authorities in providing sufficient playing grounds for sport. There was a great difficulty, and it was deplorable that in a city like Auckland that all kinds of sport should be in a bad position about grounds.

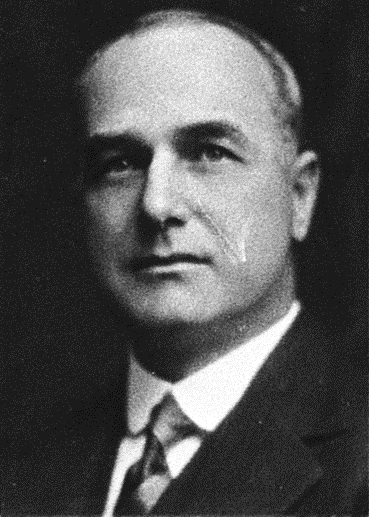
ARL patron, James Donald. He was a former MP and served on Auckland City Council. His granddaughter is Desley Simpson, the Auckland Council deputy mayor.

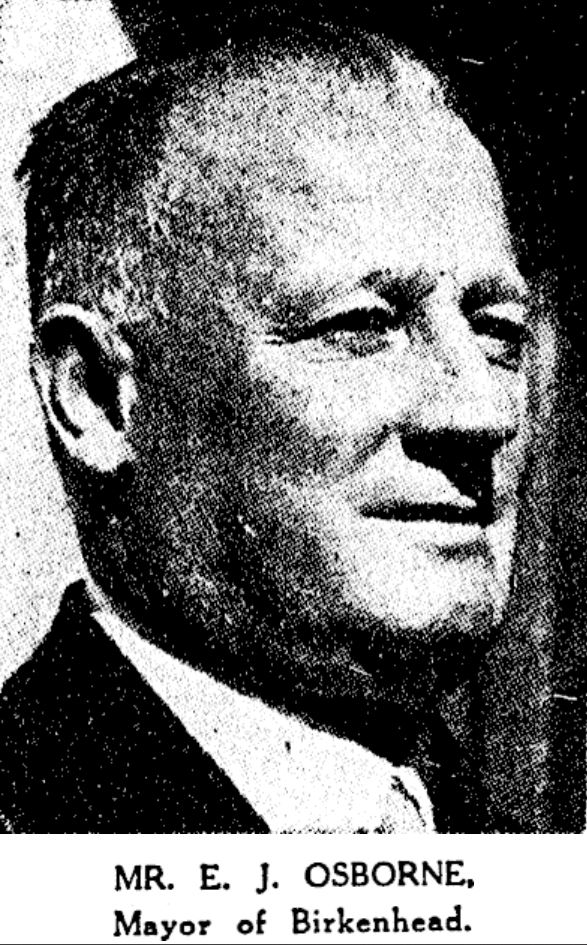
President, Ernest (Ernie) Osborne. He was the mayor of Birkenhead from 1936 to 1953.

The war had been partly responsible, as some of the playing areas had not been restored, and there was no indication that there would be any more grounds available in 1945, with the possible exception of Waikaraka Park in Onehunga. The following officers were elected: Patron, Mr. James Bell Donald; vice patron, Mr. J.F.W. Dickson; president, Ernest John Osborne (newly elected); senior club delegates to the board of control, Messrs. Jim Clark, William John Probert, M. Horan, David Wilkie; chairman of the board of control, Mr. J.W. Watson, E.J. (Ted) Phelan, Archibald Stormont; referees's delegate, Mr. William Mincham; auditors, Messrs. Garrard and Bennett; hon. solicitor, Mr. H.M. Rogerson. The following officers were elected at a meeting of the Board of Control, which followed: Deputy-chairman, Mr. Ted Phelan; hon. secretary, Mr. Ivan Culpan; time-keepers, Messrs. T. Hill and G. McCowatt; hon. treasurer, Press steward and delegate to the New Zealand Rugby League, Mr. Robert Doble. They also decided to open the season on April 14, with nominations closing on April 4. On May 16 at the league meeting it was announced that Mr. Edward (Ted) Knowling, who had been away from New Zealand with the Armed Forces was reappointed as the treasurer to the league.

=== Senior competition ===
At the board of control meeting on April 4 it was decided to play the senior competition with the same ten teams which had competed in it the previous season. On April 11 chairman J.W. Watson said that there would be a new format with major and minor championships being competed for in the second round. After the first round the competition would be split into a top half and a bottom half. At the same meeting the president of the Referees' Association protested against the present method of appointments of referees for senior matches and that qualified referees were in a better position to make the appointments". In mid May the league decided that the Senior B competition should fall under the control of the Junior Control Board, though it took the casting vote of the chairman to pass. They did however decide that the players should receive senior insurance.

At the May 23 board meeting, chairman Watson raised concern about the continued lack of form shown by the Newton and Pt Chevalier sides. He said "that the Newton team had not shown improvement. The Point Chevalier team was now in its second year, and it did not seem to have made a serious step forward". Mr. William Mincham said that the Point Chevalier team was endeavouring to improve its position. It had put up some good performances against other teams and had not been annihilated". The league decided to ask both clubs to send representatives to the next meeting. Following the meeting on May 30 which involved a discussion in committee, the chairman reported that "the officials of the clubs were working hard, and that there was every prospect of considerable improvement in the standard of play in the near future".

==== Goal kicking trophy ====
At the April 18 board meeting it was decided that the Lance Painter Cup for goal kicking should be awarded for the most points gained in the 14 matches for the minor championship. As in the previous season, Colin Riley of the Ōtāhuhu side would go on to win it in a closely fought battle with John Anderson neck and neck with him until the final round.

==== Carlaw Park ====
At the annual meeting chairman, Mr. Watson said that "it was necessary to improve the condition of the terraces at Carlaw Park. It was their intention to do concrete work once building restrictions were lifted. And it was proposed as an urgent matter to rebuild the gate entrances in the form of a memorial to fallen soldiers and a number of past officials". It was also proposed that the future home of the Auckland Rugby League management committee be at Carlaw Park with rooms to be constructed. On April 4 word was received that the district building controller had not approved of an application in connection with the proposed improvements to the main entrance gates. However they were prepared to approve of work to make the existing ticket boxes structurally safe and weatherproof. The prices for entry to weekly club matches were set at 1/ for ground admission, 6d for entry to the railway stand. Returned Servicemen with the New Zealand Shoulder Badges would be admitted to the ground for free. On May 18 it was reported that attendances were up 28 percent on the previous season. On June 20 the board thanked Mr. A. Stormont for the gift of Acmena trees to "beautify Carlaw Park", while Mr. D. Stormont gifted £10 10/ for the same purpose. In July it was reported at a weekly meeting that £524 had been given to the injured players' fund from gate receipts. It was reported in the Auckland Star on September 28 that a glass bottle had been thrown at Carlaw Park on July 21 which struck a female spectator in the terraces. The police investigated at the time and found two empty bottles "close to where the defendant (William J. Gemmell) was standing". It had occurred during the Auckland – Wellington match following Wellington's first try. It was prohibited to take liquor into the ground, though Mr. Teape said at the trial that the notices were disregarded. The Senior Magistrate, Mr. J.H. Luxford said he was "very surprised to hear that. If it is generally done I have not seen it any time I have been there".

=== Grounds ===
==== Waikaraka Park (Onehunga) ====
In April the Onehunga Borough Council advised the league that the playing area at Waikaraka Park would not be available for use by the league this year. The park had been handed back to the council by the Army authorities after they had used it for war time activities and it was now being reconstructed by the Works Department. They were hopeful that part of the ground might be ready for use by 1946. There was a large amount of metal that "would be left to work through the soil".

==== Jellicoe Park (Manurewa) ====
In early May the Manurewa Borough Council advised the Auckland Rugby League that Jellicoe Park would be available for rugby league matches on alternate Saturday's.

==== Matches at Ellerslie, Mount Wellington, and Glen Eden ====
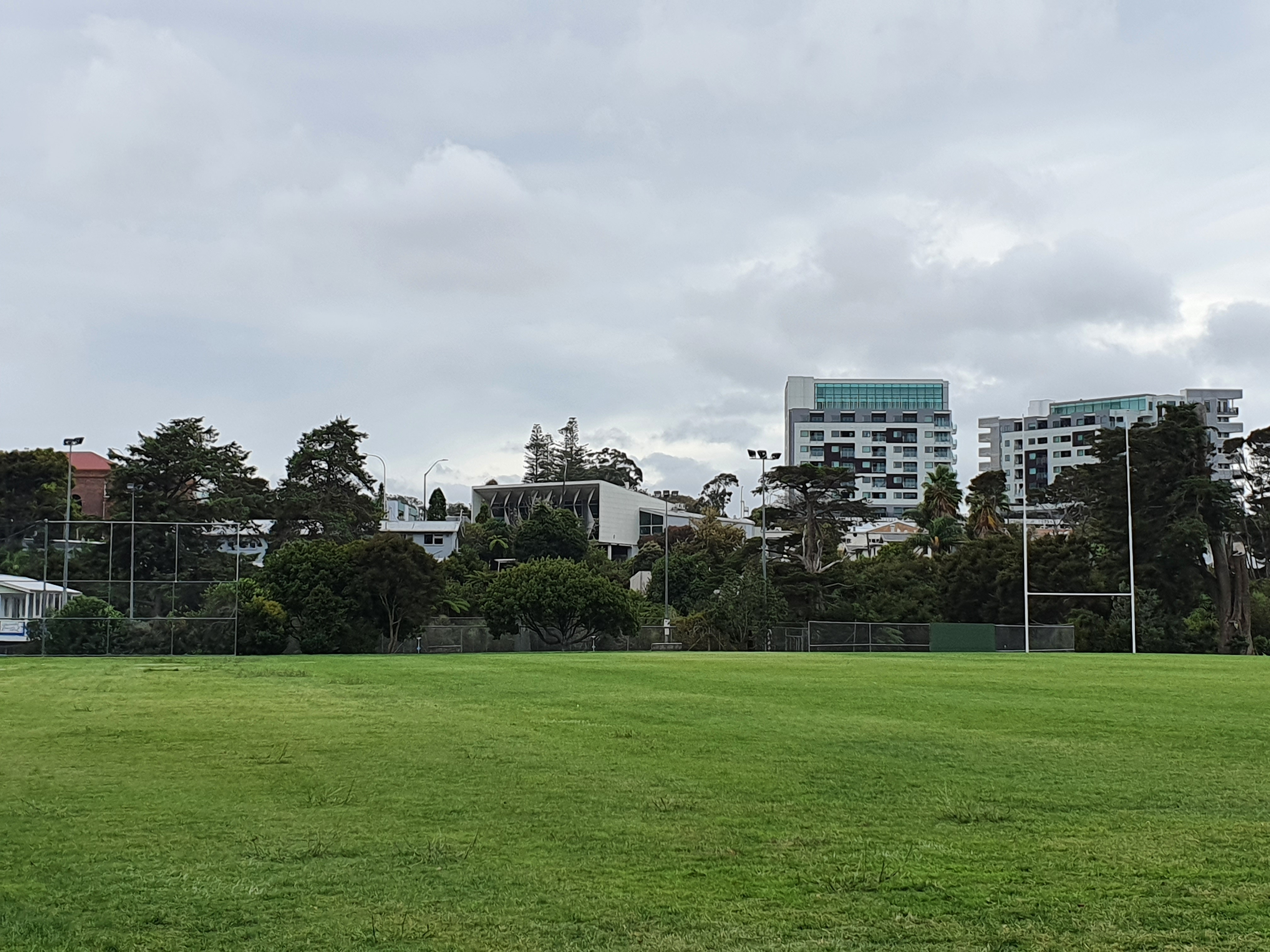
The Glen Eden Recreation Ground.

On May 16 the Ellerslie club requested that two senior matches be played in the area. One at Ellerslie and one at Mount Wellington. "It was pointed out that the Mount Wellington area was a growing district, which covered Mount Wellington, Penrose, and Panmure. The chairman, Mr. Watson said it was "a very good idea" and that they might as well play matches there as at Point Chevalier and Mount Albert. It was also indicated that rugby league might be "revived" in Mount Wellington in 1946. A senior match between City and Pt Chevalier was played at the Glen Eden Recreation Ground on August 18. At the July 25 meeting the Pt Chevalier club protested the decision to play their match at Glen Eden as they had been made to play at an outside ground on 6 of the 11 weeks of the competition. Mr. R. Doble said that "Walker Park was the club's home ground". Chairman, Mr. J.W. Watson said that it was the club's first year and did not feel that it had suffered any hardship".

=== Auckland clubs on tour ===
Late in the season permission was granted for Ōtāhuhu to travel to the West Coast, Richmond to New Plymouth on October 6, and Ponsonby to play an exhibition game in Cambridge on October 13.

=== Social evening and dance ===
On Thursday, August 2 the Ladies' Social Committee organised a dance at the Peter Pan Cabaret. The special guests were the West Coast rugby league team. Mrs. Rowe was the honorary secretary of the Ladies' Social Committee. On August 8 Mrs. I Scott on behalf of the Ladies' Committee presented a cheque for 100 guineas to the injured players fund. Then on October 4 they held the Auckland Rugby League Dance at the Peter Pan Cabaret with the South Island team being the quests for the evening.

=== Visit of Balmain ===
In late June the Balmain club side from Sydney sent a proposal to the Auckland Rugby League to play a series of matches. It was decided to discuss it at the next board meeting on July 4. The Balmain side had won the championship the previous season and had five players in the New South Wales side which had recently played Queensland. After meeting, the Auckland Rugby League offered to arrange matches for Balmain on October 12, 20, and 22, with the possibility of a match on Wednesday, October 17. Plans later firmed to begin the tour on October 13. It was originally attended to try and fly the team to and from New Zealand but this was not possible due to a lack of space so they would travel by boat. The tour was abruptly cancelled however on August 1 when the Balmain club notified the ARL that they were unable to secure confirmed return transportation. Their secretary, Mr Harold Matthews wrote "we can get over all right, but because of lack of regular shipping facilities there is no guarantee we can get back".

=== Player news ===
==== Brian Nordgren ====
In December it was reported that Brian Nordgren had been signed by Wigan following a magnificent, record breaking season in Auckland rugby league. He was also a well known sprinter and co-holder of the New Zealand junior 100 yards record. Nordgren transferred from the Manukau Rovers rugby club towards the end of the 1944 season and joined the Ponsonby rugby league club for their last few games. He scored 267 points across all teams and was the first player in New Zealand to ever score 100 points from tries alone in a single season. After moving to England he played 294 games for Wigan from 1946 to 1955 scoring 312 tries and kicking 109 goals. After returning to New Zealand following his playing retirement he practices law in Auckland and Hamilton and also coached Ponsonby.

==== Allan Wiles switches codes ====
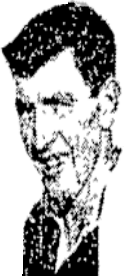
Allan Wiles

In March rumours surfaced that Allan Wiles was going to switch from rugby union to rugby league. Wiles had been one of the best centre three-quarters in Auckland Rugby the previous season and played for New Zealand Services against New Zealand. Wiles had also represented the Auckland rugby side. He was rumoured to be going to play for Mount Albert United and the rumours turned out to be true. Wiles would go on to become Kiwi #312 in 1948. Wiles also played 5 first class cricket games for Auckland in the 1946/47 season while representing the Ponsonby-Balmoral club.

==== Transfer wrangle with George Mitchell ====
On April 19 it was reported that a request had been made for George Mitchell to be allowed to play for Ponsonby, having previously been a member of the Richmond club. Ponsonby had appealed after Richmond had decided not to give permission for him to transfer. Mitchell said that he "had been in the Armed Forces for the last three years For two seasons he played rugby, but he did not play any football last season. He decided to have a spell, in view of getting a clearance to play for Ponsonby this season. As he had not played for 12 months he considered that he was entitled to ask for a clearance". Mitchell, a Pacific Island born player had represented New Zealand in 1939, while his older brother Alf Mitchell also played for New Zealand in 1935. A week later it was announced that Mitchell would be allowed to play for Ponsonby after Richmond no longer objected.

=== Opai Asher testimonial match ===
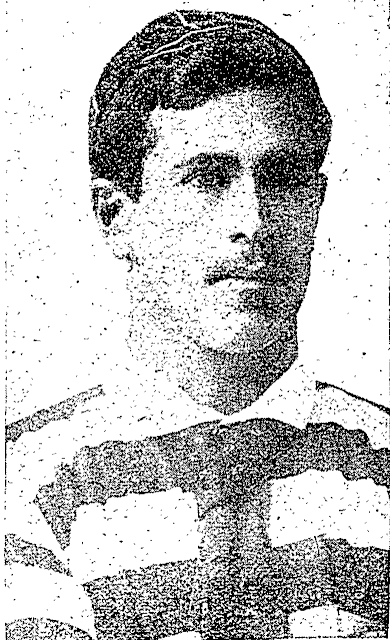
Opai (Albert) Asher in his playing days.

On September 8 a testimonial match was played for Opai (Albert) Asher who was the groundsman at Carlaw Park. He had been a well known New Zealand international playing 7 matches for them from 1910 to 1913. Prior to that Asher played rugby union for the All Blacks in 11 matches in 1903, scoring a remarkable 17 tries. After switching to rugby league Asher played 63 matches for City Rovers from 1909 to 1917 scoring 16 tries and kicking 22 goals. His representative rugby league career included 22 appearances for New Zealand Māori, 2 for Australasia in 1910, and 18 for Auckland. At the end of the 1945 season he was retiring and moving back to Tauranga to spend his retirement years with his family. The match was a Roope Rooster replay between Ōtāhuhu and City who had drawn 7-7 the previous week despite 20 minutes of extra time being played. It was reported after the match that £150 had been received and that more money was expected to come in. He was eventually presented with a cheque for £164 by Ted Phelan.

=== Representative season ===
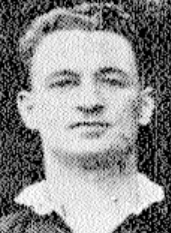
Jack Kirwan, one of the three Auckland selectors

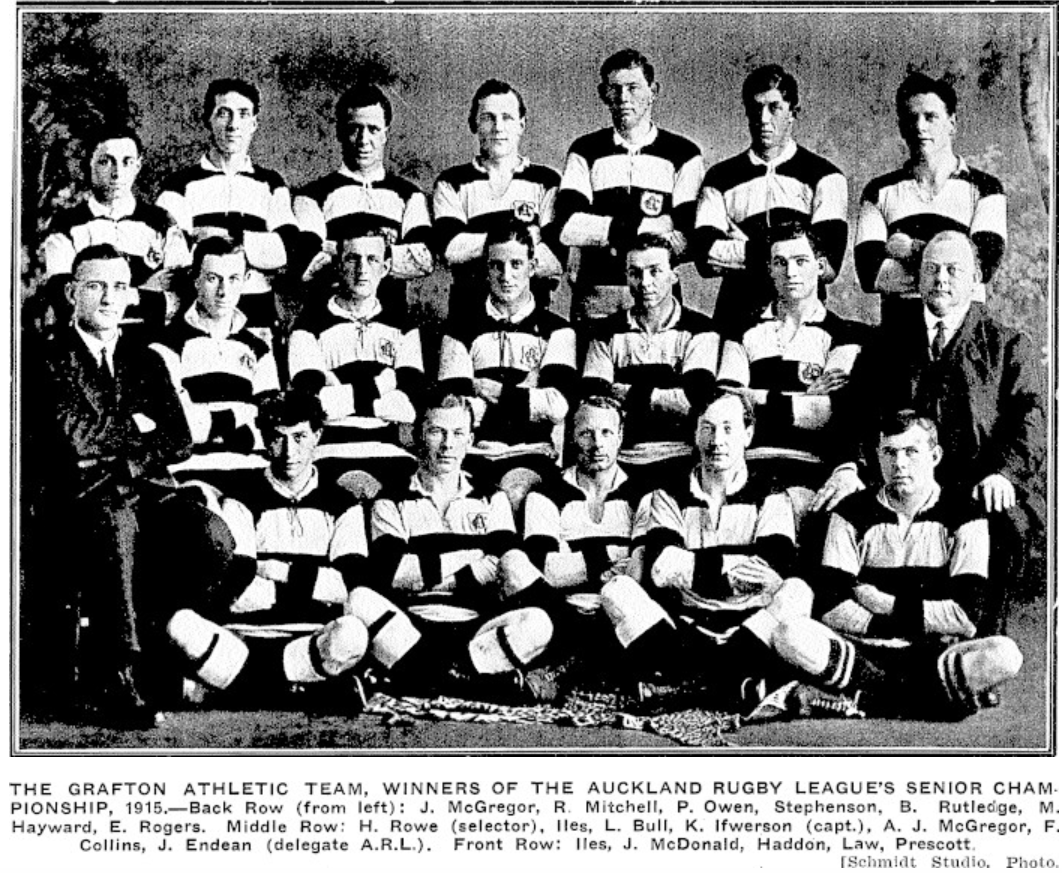
Auckland selector, Dougie McGregor (A.J. McGregor) in the 1915 Grafton Athletic side which won the Auckland senior championship.

In April the Auckland representative selectors were appointed and were Jack Kirwan, J Clark, and Dougie McGregor. On the motion of Mr. Watson it was decided that admission to representative matches in 1945 the charge would be 1/6, plus 1/ to the grandstand. On July 26 Auckland beat Wellington 46 to 7 at Carlaw Park. While the result was extremely one sided the match drew 12,000 spectators and earned £744 in gate takings with the net being £709. This was divided equally among the two league's which would receive £354 each.

=== Schoolboy tour and news ===
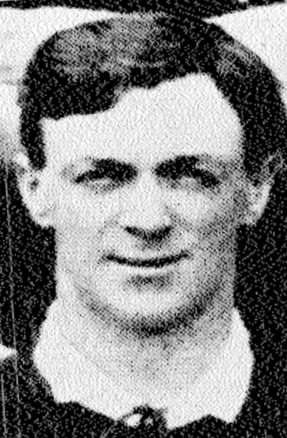
Maurice Wetherill who travelled with the junior side to the South Island. He was a former NZ international and test referee.

In August the Auckland Schoolboys toured the south with L Rout and Maurice Wetherill travelling with the side. Their first match was played against Canterbury in Greymouth and was won 14 to 3. They lost their next match to West Coast on August 26 by 14 points to 2. On September 19 at the ARL board meeting the lack of a grade between primary school and post high school was lacking for boys of that age. L. Rout from the Schoolboys grade management committee was part of a deputation to the board meeting and he said "school football in New Zealand is at sixes and sevens, and there is a need for uniformity about weights and ages". He went on to point out that "when the boys left the schoolboy ranks and went to secondary school no provision was made for them. The Schoolboys' Board asked the league to provide a grade to take care of those boys. The Junior Control Board, it was stated, was in agreement with the proposal. They wanted to cater for boys up to 16 years in the secondary schools, with a weight limit of 8st 9lb. The Junior Control Board could then carry on. At present there was a big gap and it should be filled. Maurice Wetherill said that at present there was a gap between schoolboy football and the seventh grade". The chairman, Mr. J. W. Watson suggested that further discussion on the matter. It was decided a week later that the School Control Board be given permission to organise a secondary schools' competition for 1946 with the maximum age to be 16 on May 1, and the maximum weight 8st 9lb. At an Arl meeting on October 16 Mr. E.J. Osborne said that "it was necessary to get the game into the schools to make a real success of the code in the Dominion". Maurice Wetherill said that they had "450 schoolboys playing the code. The aim now was to get the game going in the secondary schools, and to start a competition with a weight limit of about 8st 9lb". Mr. I Stonex said that in the past season they had 55 teams in the schoolboy competition.

=== Obituaries ===
==== Phillip George Thomas Donovan ====
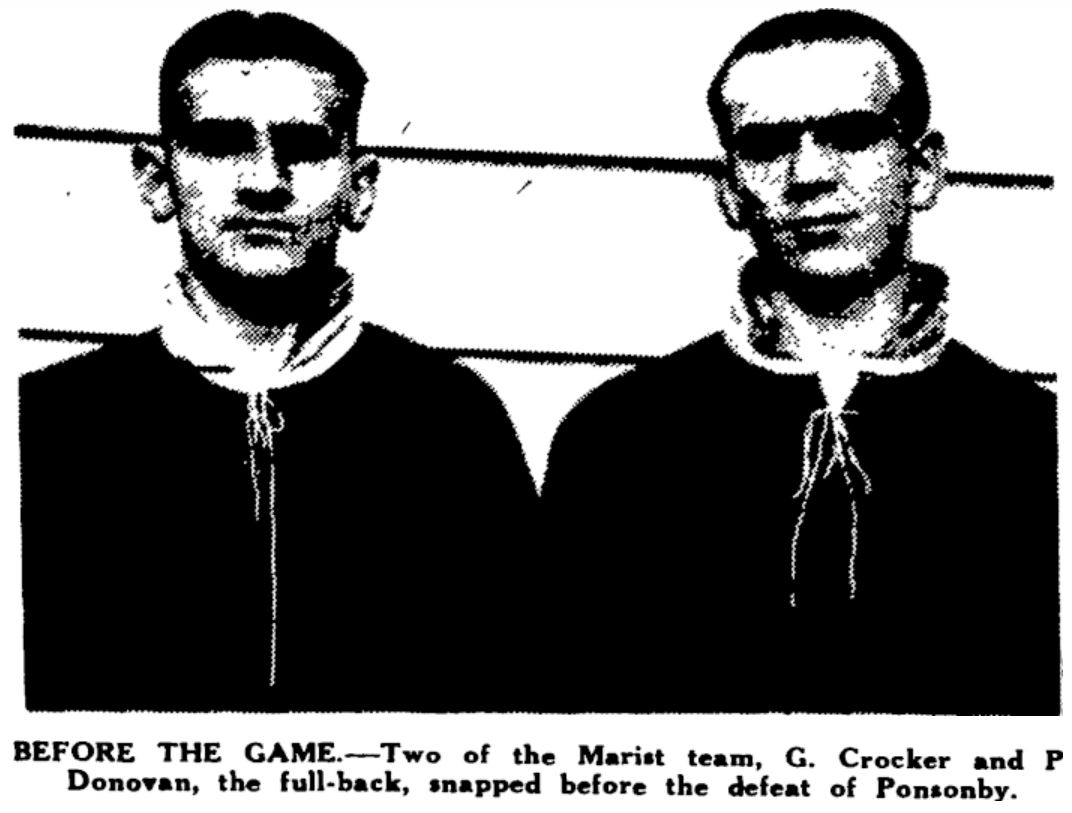
Phil Donovan on the right with Marist team mate Gordon Crocker in 1937.

On March 10, 1945, Phillip (Phil) Donovan was accidentally killed in Italy aged 28. He went to school at St. John's Convent and Parnell School where he had lived with his parents who predeceased him. Donovan played juniors for Marist and then for Marist Old Boys seniors from 1937 to 1942 as a five eighth along with his brother Jack who had retired and become a senior referee. Donovan played 57 senior games for Marist, scoring 12 tries and kicking a penalty. The Auckland Star wrote "he was a powerful attacking back and perhaps best known by his fine sportsmanship". His other brothers, Alan and Eugene were current players for City and also represented Auckland. Phil joined the Army in 1941 and left New Zealand in May, 1943. While in the Middle East he "played good football in games between the divisional teams". He left behind a wife (Nora) who lived in Onehunga. Donovan was buried at Ancona War Cemetery in Italy.

==== Ivan Douglas Urukaraka Gregory ====
On December 3 at 8.50pm, Ivan Douglas Urukaraka Gregory died in an accident at Rotorua. He was a well known Māori rugby league player who had joined Manukau in late 1940, playing with them until 1942 scoring 8 tries. He then joined Newton Rangers in 1943 and scored 48 points including 8 tries. He played 1 match for Auckland Māori in 1941 against Auckland Pākehā scoring 3 tries, and again for the same side in 1943. He also represented Auckland at centre in their match with South Auckland (Waikato) on September 18, 1943, at Davies Park in Huntly. Gregory had also played for South Auckland against Auckland and represented Rotorua as well. He died "as the result of injuries received when he fell into a hot pool" near Tarewa Road on the morning of December 3. It was "understood that he was cooking his breakfast over a pool in the morning when the ground on which he was standing suddenly caved in. He was precipitated into the pool and suffered severe scalding from the chest downwards. He managed to scramble out of the pool and, despite his injuries reached his home some 25 yards distant. Awakening his wife he told her of the accident and aid was summoned. He was rushed to Rotorua public hospital in a critical condition but failed to respond to treatment during the day. Gregory was aged 25 and was survived by his wife and a young child. He was a nephew of Steve Watene.

== Fox Memorial Shield (senior grade championship) ==
=== Fox Memorial standings ===
Team	Pld	W	D	L	F	A	Pts
Otahuhu Rovers	14	11	1	2	266	103	23
Richmond Rovers	14	11	0	3	266	100	22
Ponsonby United	14	9	0	5	222	156	18
Mount Albert United	14	9	0	5	177	139	18
City Rovers	14	7	1	6	174	177	15
Marist Old Boys	14	6	1	7	162	148	13
North Shore Albions	14	6	1	7	138	197	13
Manukau	14	5	0	9	189	188	10
Point Chevalier	14	2	0	12	118	264	4
Newton Rangers	14	2	0	12	75	314	4

=== Fox Memorial results ===
==== Round 1 ====
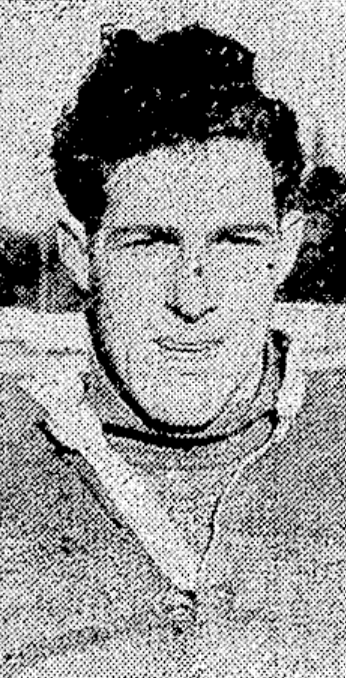
Maurie Robertson scored a try on debut for Richmond. He went on to play for New Zealand and later coached the national side.

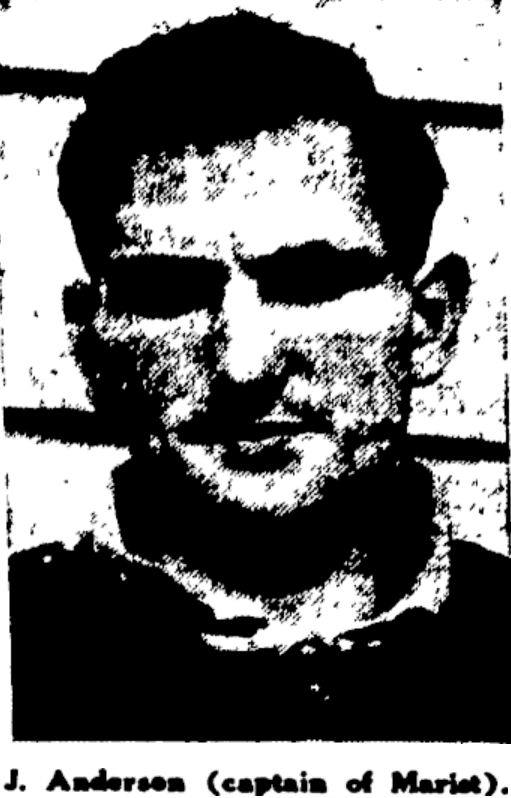
John Anderson who had rejoined the Marist club.

Prior to the matches at Carlaw Park 2 minutes silence was observed to mark the passing of United States President, Franklin D. Roosevelt. The season was opened with Auckland Rugby League president E.J. Osborne kicking off. The Marist side featured former New Zealand international, and prodigious goal kicker, John Anderson who had transferred back to the club after a season with Point Chevalier. He scored a try and kicked 4 goals in their win over City. For Mt Albert there were three rugby transfers making their debut, including future Kiwi, Allan Wiles. The Ōtāhuhu side featured 4 brothers in the forward pack. They were Joffre Johnson who would become a Kiwi in 1947, Ivan, Mick, and Norm. Norm had previously represented Auckland and weighed 14 stone. While the North Shore match with Manukau saw the debut of Jack Russell-Green who was said to have played gamely at halfback against the huge Manukau forward pack. In 1949 he was selected for the New Zealand side and became Kiwi #321. The others were Ray Neary and Des Pike. Otahuhu also had two brothers in the backline with W.R. Speedy, a promoted junior giving a "fine display" at five eighth. Richmond had Des Ryan on debut in their game against Pt Chevalier. Ryan had switched from rugby union where he had represented Auckland three years earlier. In the same match Pt Chevalier had promoted Doug Anderson from their 4th grade side. He was said to have shown promise and would go on to represent New Zealand from 1947 to 1954. Following the matches it was reported that the gate takings for the opening round were the highest for years.

14 April	Richmond	22-6	Pt Chevalier	Carlaw Park 2
1.40	Try: Maurice Potter 2, Hoskins, William Kinney, Maurie Robertson, Frank Hilton; Con: Bernard Lowther, R Seymour		Pen: Len Davies 3	Referee: Ernest Pope

14 April	Manukau	35-9	North Shore	Carlaw Park 2
3:00	Try: Pita Ririnui 2, George Shilton 2, Joe Murray, W Rogers, E Pai; Con: Tom Butler 4, Tommy Chase 3		Try: Arthur Read 2, Bruce Graham	Referee: E Longville

14 April	Marist	17-10	City	Carlaw Park 1
1.40	Try: J Smith 2, John Anderson; Con: John Anderson 2 Pen: John Anderson 2		Try: Alan Legge, J Cunningham; Con: Warwick Clarke; Pen: Warwick Clarke	Referee: H Tate

14 April	Ōtāhuhu	17-4 (7-4)	Mt Albert	Carlaw Park 1
3:00	Try: Jack Speedy, Norm Johnson, Cliff Wellm; Con: Colin Riley; Pen: Colin Riley 3		Pen: Basil Cranch 2	Referee: J O'Shannessey

14 April	Ponsonby	11-3	Newton	Grey Lynn Park
3:00	Try: Brian Nordgren, Roy Nurse, Don Mullett; Con: Darcy Bailey		Try: George Woolley	Referee: H Payne

==== Round 2 ====
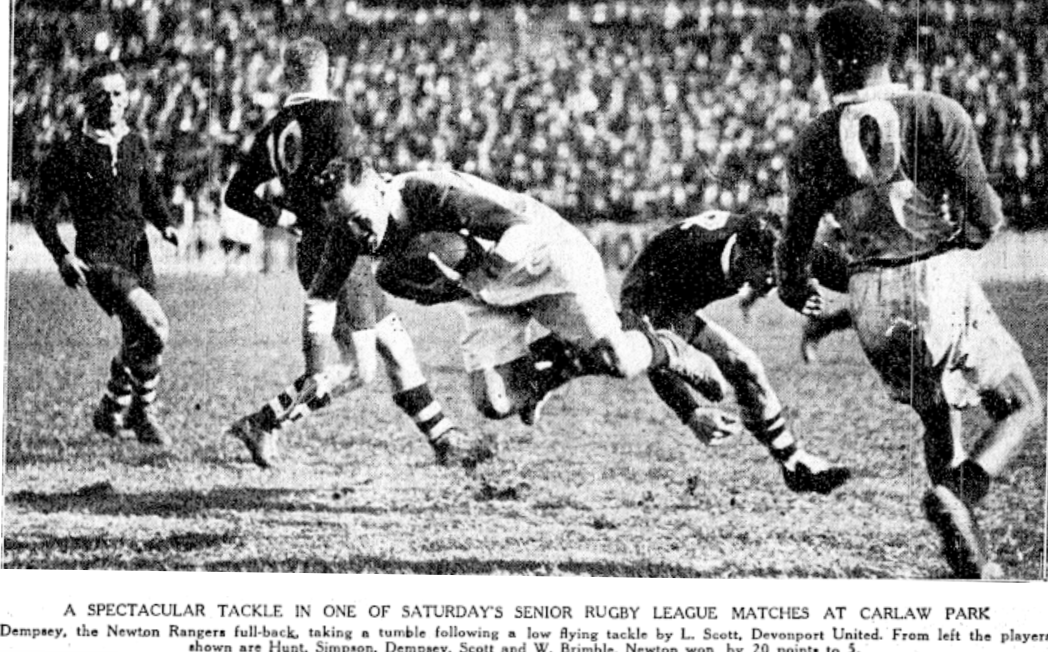
Wilfred in the '0' jersey with Claude Dempsey being tackled in a match between Newton and Devonport in 1935

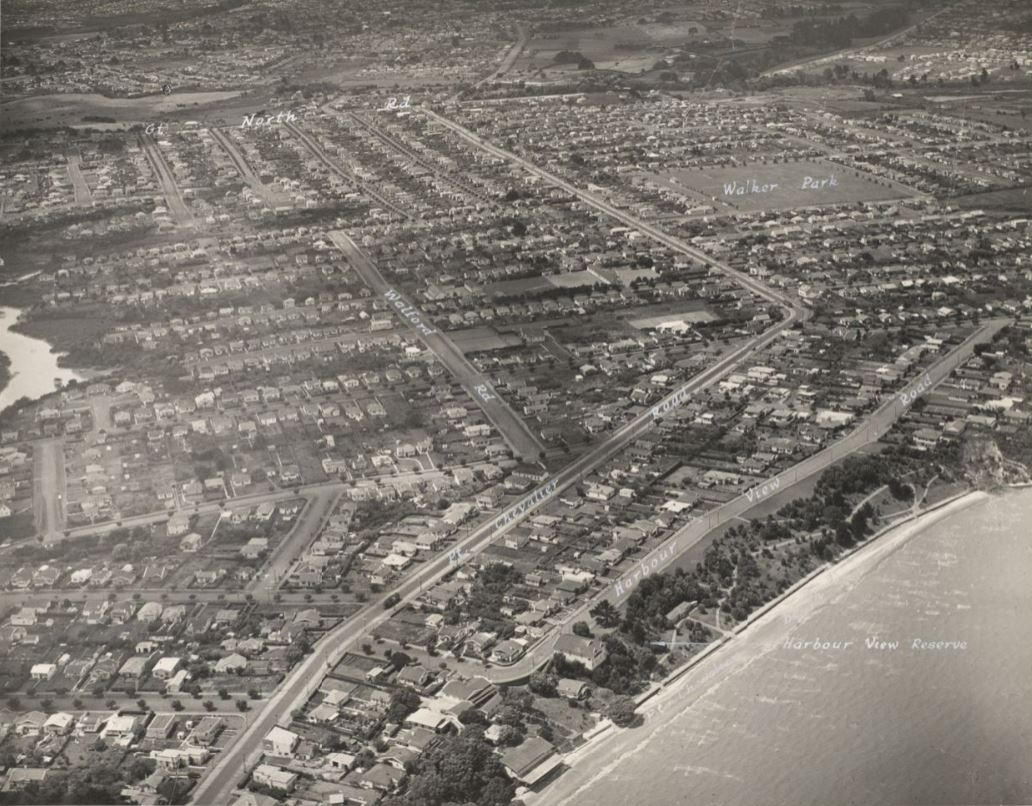
Pt Chevalier in 1945, with Walker Park in the top right where Pt Chevalier's match was played with Marist. Their club room is on the corner of Pt Chevalier Rd and Oliver St slightly to the right of centre

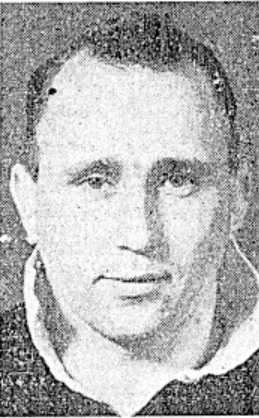
Harold Milliken was the leader of the Mt Albert forward pack in their 14-7 win over Ponsonby.

Wilfred Brimble debuted for Ponsonby after having returned from the war. He had previously played for Newton from 1935 to 1939, and represented Auckland in 1939 and New Zealand in 6 matches in 1938. It was reported following the second round that the gate takings had thus far been more than double the amount from the corresponding period in 1944. Chairman Watson said that "it was an augury of a successful season and showed the great interest being taken in sport". Brimble got the ball away "sharply" from the set scrums to Allen and on to Travers Hardwick who was usually a forward but was playing at inside centre. They in turn gave good service to P Kelly at centre. Arthur Desmond (Des) Pike scored a try for Mt Albert. He had switched codes and had represented Auckland rugby previously, as well as being an Auckland junior cricket representative. He was heavily involved in the war effort, making specialist equipment for the Department of Scientific and Industrial Research and midway through the year began playing rugby union once more for Army sides. He later represented Wellington at rugby union. His team mate, Basil Cranch secured the rest of Mt Albert's points through a try, conversion, and three penalties. The outstanding forward for Mt Albert was Harold Milliken the former All Black and New Zealand rugby league representative. For Otahuhu Colin Riley converted two of their three tries and added three penalties to help them to a 19-17 win over City. Warwick Clarke converted all three of City's tries and also kicked a penalty. Richmond had an easy 26-7 win against North Shore with Bernard Lowther scoring three tries and kicking two conversions and a penalty. Tommy Chase in his ninth season for Manukau converted five of their six tries in their 31-5 victory over Newton. North Shore were "depleted" by injury and army service. Captain, Horace Hunt was injured while Arthur Read was required by the Army, and J McArthur, Cave, and Mercer were also now in the armed forces.

21 April	Ōtāhuhu	19-17	City	Carlaw Park 1
1.40	Try: Royce Speedy, Cliff Wellm, Mick Johnson; Con: Colin Riley 2 Pen: Colin Riley 3		Try: Fred James 2, Peter McManus; Con: Warwick Clarke 3 Pen: Warwick Clarke	Referee: H Tate

21 April	Mt Albert	14-7 (6-3)	Ponsonby	Carlaw Park 1
3:00	Try: Basil Cranch, Des Pike; Con: Basil Cranch; Pen: Basil Cranch 3		Try: Brian Nordgren; Pen: Brian Nordgren 2	Referee: George Kelly

21 April	Richmond	26-7 (13-7)	North Shore	Carlaw Park 2
1.40	Try: Bernard Lowther 3, William Kinney, Jack Magill, Potter; Con: Bernard Lowther 2 Pen: Bernard Lowther, Jack Magill, Harkins		Try: Bruce Graham; Con: Roy Clark; Pen: Roy Clark	Referee: Ernest Pope

21 April	Manukau	31-5 (10-5)	Newton	Carlaw Park 2
3:00	Try: Wiremu Te Tai, Masters, A Taumata, George Shilton, Ranginui Ewe, Tom Butler, Jack Major; Con: Tommy Chase 5		Try: Keen; Con: McKay	Referee: P Bailey

21 April	Pt Chevalier	5-29 (0-12)	Marist	Walker Park
3:00	Try: Dayle; Drop: Len Davies		Try: Dave McWilliams 2, J Smith, George Davidson 2 Con: John Anderson 4 Pen: John Anderson 3	Referee: J O'Shannessey

==== Round 3 ====
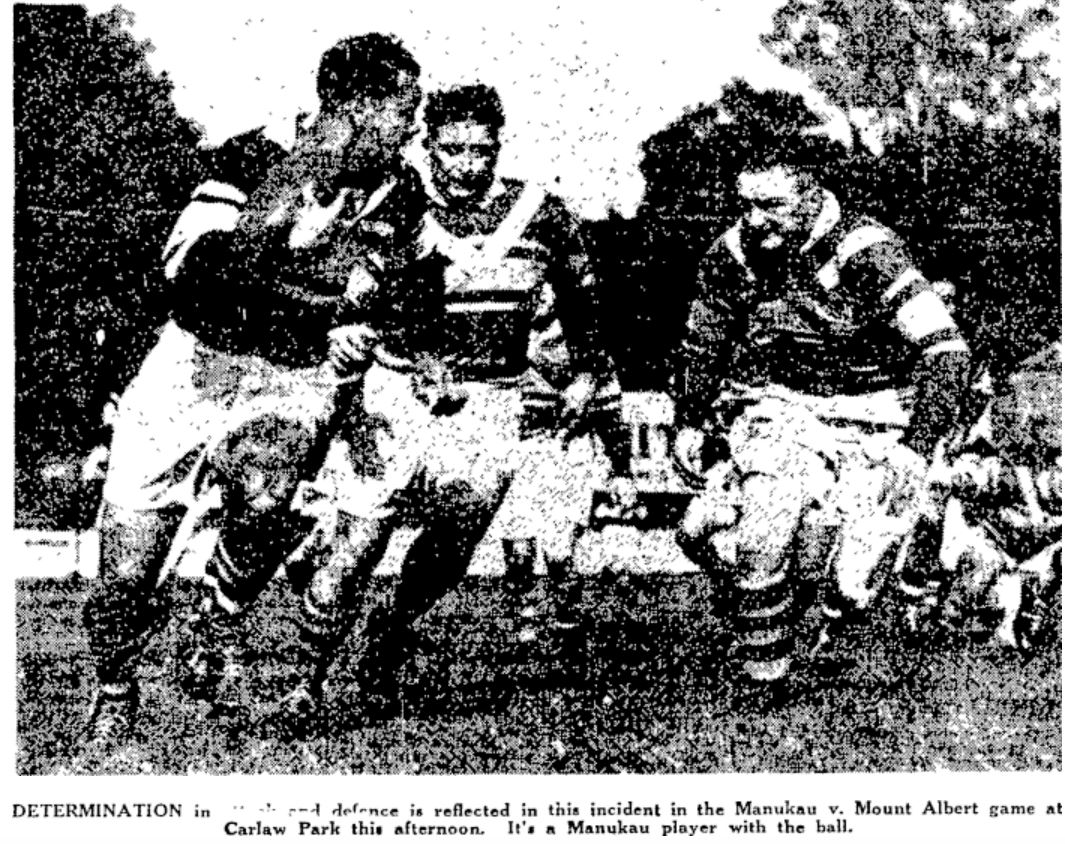
A Manukau player carrying the ball in their match with Mount Albert.

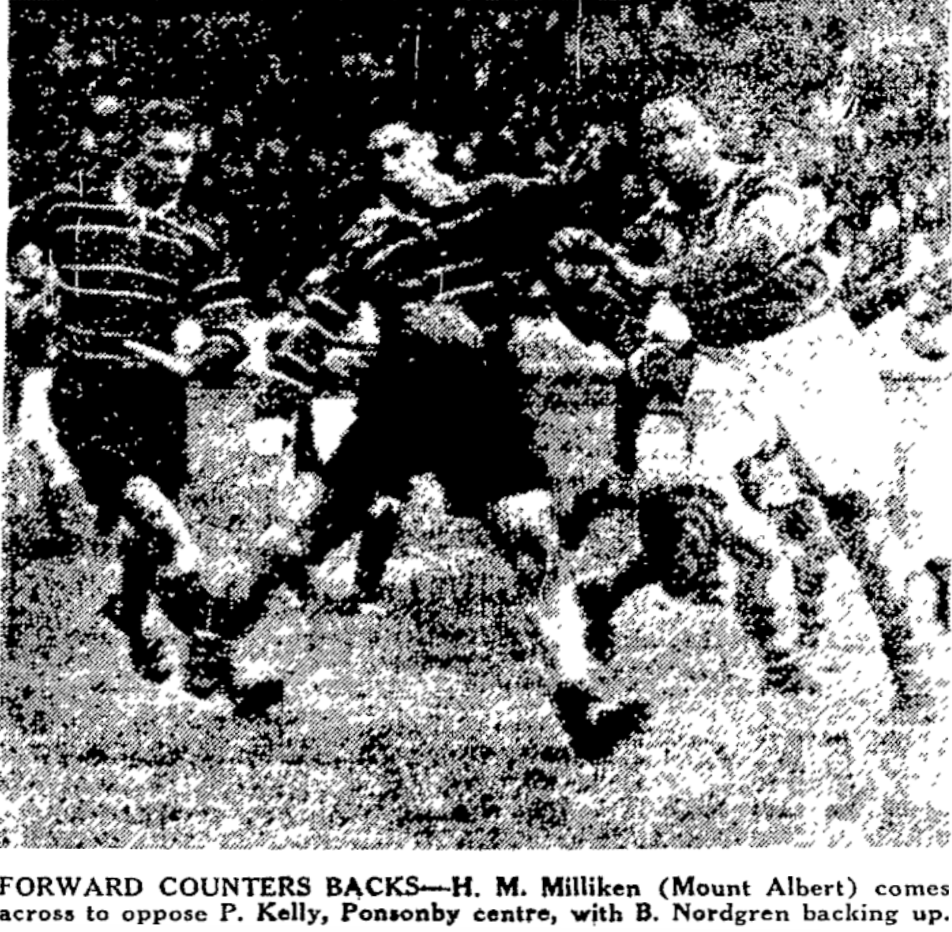
Harold Milliken on the right of Mt Albert coming across to contest a kick. Pat Kelly of Ponsonby is making the kick while Brian Nordgren of Ponsonby is approaching in support.

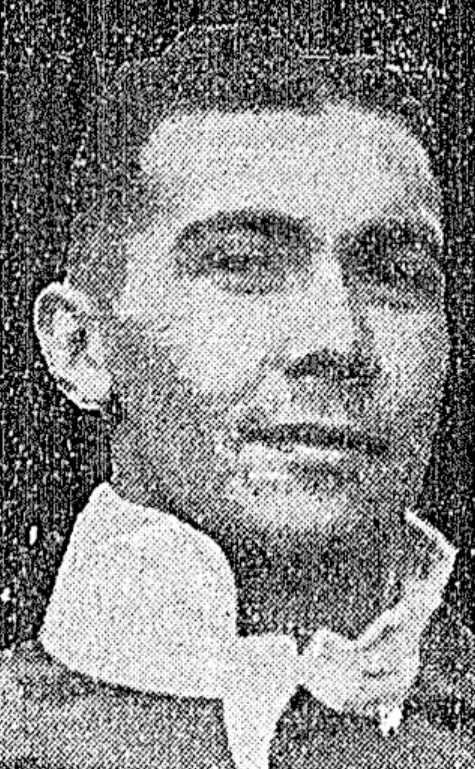
George Mitchell who had transferred from Richmond to Ponsonby. He had played six seasons for Richmond and been selected for New Zealand for their 1939 tour of England.

The match between Richmond and Newton on Carlaw Park 2 saw Richmond win by an Auckland senior club record score of 70 points to 0. The score at halftime was 34–0. H Hobman was on debut as a senior grade referee in the same match. The main match saw the two best goal kickers in Auckland going head to head with John Anderson representing Marist, while Colin Riley was kicking for Ōtāhuhu. They each kicked 3 goals, though Riley was to go on to kick the most in the season, a feat he achieved the year prior also. In the match between Manukau and Mt Albert Tommy Chase came up from full back to replace Jack Major at half back who was unavailable with winger Tom Butler moving to full back. Chase had moved to full back to fill Ralph Martin's place. Martin had requested a transfer to his junior club, Otahuhu but Manukau had refused the transfer. He said that if the transfer was not granted he would play for M.N. Paewai's newly formed Aotea rugby club. Chase had first "come into prominence as a rugby union player in the Whanganui district when, at 17 years of age he was a member of the New Zealand Māori team which visited Australia in 1935". He moved to Auckland and joined the Manukau club along with his brother Rangi Chase. George Mitchell had joined Ponsonby and scored for them in their loss to City. He had come to Auckland from Feilding Old Boys rugby side in 1937 along with his brother Alf Mitchell and joined the Richmond club. In 1939 he was selected for New Zealand to tour England. Both brothers were born in the Pacific Islands to a Samoan mother and English father and were two of the first ever Pacific Island representatives in the New Zealand rugby league side. In City's 19-14 win over Ponsonby Albert Silva scored a try, kicked three conversions and two penalties.

28 April	Mt Albert	17-15 (4-10)	Manukau	Carlaw Park 1
1.40	Try: Allan Wiles, Jack Zane-Zaninovich, Des Pike; Con: Basil Cranch 2 Pen: Basil Cranch 2		Try: W Rogers, George Shilton, Joe Murray; Con: Tommy Chase 2 Pen: Tommy Chase	Referee: Ernest Pope

28 April	Ōtāhuhu	9-9 (7-7)	Marist	Carlaw Park 1
3:00	Try: Mick Johnson; Con: Colin Riley; Pen: Colin Riley 2		Try: Don McLeod; Con: John Anderson; Pen: John Anderson 2	Referee: H Tate

28 April	City	19-14 (5-12)	Ponsonby	Carlaw Park 2
1.40	Try: Fred James, Albert Silva, Pouvi (Robert) Salaia; Con: Albert Silva 3 Pen: Albert Silva 2		Try: George Mitchell, Travers Hardwick; Con: Brian Nordgren; Pen: Brian Nordgren 3	Referee: Stuart Billman

28 April	Richmond	70-0 (34-0)	Newton	Carlaw Park 2
3:00	Try: Jack Satherley 2, Bernard Lowther 4, R Robertson, William Kinney, Maurice Robertson 3, A Thompson 2, Frank Furnell 2, Des Ryan; Con: Bernard Lowther 7, Frank Furnell 2, Jack Magill 2			Referee: H Hobman

28 April	North Shore	11-5	Pt Chevalier	Devonport Domain
3:00	Try: Unknown		Try: Unknown	Referee: George Kelly

==== Round 4 ====
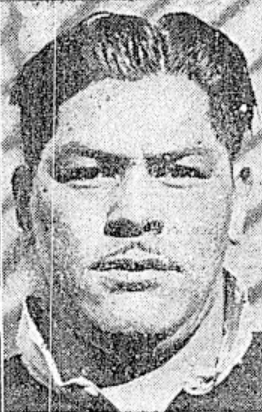
Pita Ririnui who stood out for his attacking play for Manukau.

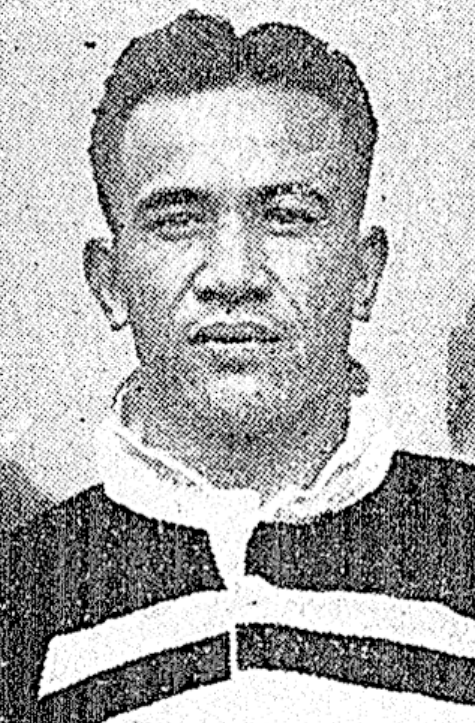
Tommy Chase who kicked six goals for Manukau in their win.

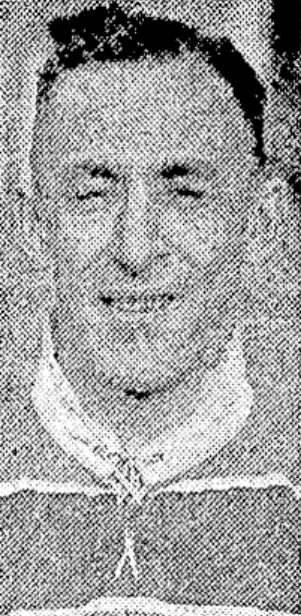
Warwick Clarke, the City Rovers fullback who was outstanding

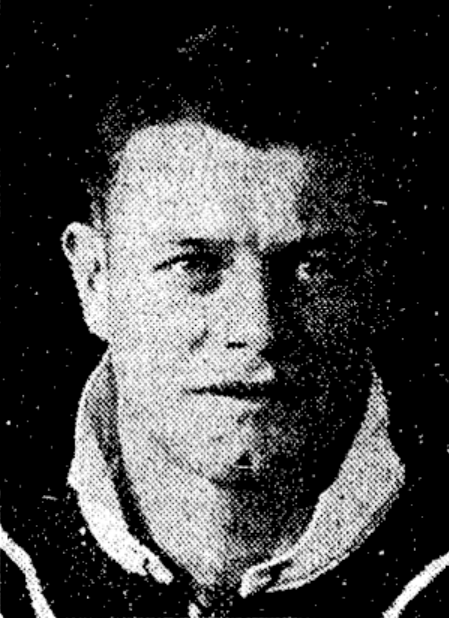
Jack Satherley, who had rejoined the Richmond side.

Manukau beat City 21-13 after having trailed 2-10 at halftime. They however opened the scoring when Pita Ririnui drove them into the City end and Tommy Chase kicked a penalty. Warwick Clarke the "brilliant" City fullback was standing out with his long kicking and "clever positional play". Albert Silva, the City captain kicked a long range penalty goal and from a set scrum on halfway Alan Donovan got the backs going with Silva and Robert Salaia showing speed and thrust with F. Simpson on the wing running diagonally for the corner and scoring. Silva kicked another magnificent penalty from near halfway. Silva added to their lead when he followed up a kick and Chase kicked low but Silva was able to block it and score. Just before halftime City forward Eugene Donovan went off injured and was replaced by Rex Cunningham who ordinarily played at halfback. Cunningham went on to represent New Zealand at halfback from 1946 to 1948 17 times including four tests. In the second half Manukau dominated with Ririnui making a break and sending M. Thompson in out wide, and then Chase kicked a penalty. City broke the scoring pattern when F. Simpson went over but Chase added another penalty and then Joe Murray went close to scoring before Jack Major crossed. Manukau played George Shilton off the back of the scrum in order to attack more and on full time W. Webster on the wing chased his own kick to score. The Mt Albert 11-7 win against Richmond was described as a "brilliant football" game. Ron Neary scored his first try for Mt Albert. He had switched from rugby union at the start of the season from the Marist club and had previously played centre for the Auckland representative team. His try came when Ivan Sumich "made a clever opening. The ball travelled to Neary, who raced ahead, gave it on to Wiles, and finally Pedley, outpaced the Richmond defence to score". Basil Cranch converted the try but then Richmond attacked through Des Ryan and Thompson with Bernard Lowther finishing off the movement. Jack Satherley who had rejoined the Richmond side made a break which nearly resulted in a try to Maurice Potter. Close to halftime Harold Milliken passed to S. Rosewarne who sent it on to Clarence Conza who was tackled just short. From the resulting scrum Les Clement passed to Neary to Milliken to Des Pike who "barged over for a good try". The last points for Mt Albert came when Neary took the ball from a scrum and raced 25 yards to score. Ponsonby had suffered a large number of injuries early in the season and had a weakened side in their loss to Ōtāhuhu. It included Don Mullett, who was also a well known champion heavy weight boxer. Dick Hull, their captain was also out injured with a bad leg injury. Arthur Kay had broken ribs in their final practice match and had not played thus far but hoped to back a week later. While Wilfred Brimble was also thought to be a spectator as well. Otahuhu's forwards "displayed more speed and were persistent in their attacks to the last whistle". The "strongly built" Otahuhu right wing kicked two penalties to extend their lead to 7-0. In the second half R Keat kicked another penalty for Otahuhu and then Jack Speedy, their half back broke up field before being tackled but managing to pass to Cliff Wellm who scored. In the forwards Hermes Hadley, Travers Hardwick, and George Mitchell were playing well. In the second half Otahuhu lost forward, Norm Johnson to injury however they still managed a try to Brady which was converted by R Seymour. Near the end Ted Allen ran from a Ponsonby scrum and passed to Travers Hardwick who scored and Brian Nordgren converted. The Auckland Star wrote a piece on match day about the various hookers in the competition. Marist beat North Shore 17-10 in a match featuring several past or future New Zealand representatives. For North Shore Jack Smith scored two tries while Bruce Graham added one and Roy Clark kicked a conversion and a penalty. John Anderson scored a try and kicked three penalties for Marist. Kenneth Finlayson was back playing for Marist after having played for them several seasons earlier (1937–41) before a move to Ōtāhuhu (1942–43) and then to Manukau (1944). He was the son of Charles Finlayson who had played cricket for New Zealand and also rugby league for New Zealand in 1913. The merry-go-round continued with Owen Hughes starting his career with City now playing for Ponsonby after having played for Ōtāhuhu in between, Raymond Lohenet moving from Ponsonby to City. It was also rumoured that the veteran Bert Leatherbarrow, who had represented City in 1944, would turn out for them later in the year, after stints with North Shore (1931–34) and Mt Albert (1937–43).

5 May	Manukau	21-13 (2-10)	City	Carlaw Park 1
3:10	Try: M Thompson, Jack Major, W Webster; Con: Tommy Chase 3 Pen: Tommy Chase 3		Try: F Simpson 3 Pen: Albert Silva 2	Referee: J O'Shannessey

5 May	Mt Albert	11-7 (8-3)	Richmond	Carlaw Park 1
1:40	Try: D.W. Padlie, Des Pike, Ron Neary; Con: Basil Cranch		Try: Bernard Lowther; Pen: Frank Furnell 2	Referee: George Kelly

5 May	Ōtāhuhu	17-5 (7-0)	Ponsonby	Carlaw Park 2
3:00	Try: Cliff Wellm 2, H Brady; Con: R Seymour; Pen: H Brady 2, Keat		Try: Travers Hardwick; Con: Brian Nordgren	Referee: Ernest Pope

5 May	Marist	17-10 (17-5)	North Shore	Carlaw Park 2
1:40	Try: Jack Smith 2, Jimmy White; Con: John Anderson; Pen: John Anderson 3		Try: Bruce Graham, Jack Smith; Con: Roy Clark; Pen: Roy Clark	Referee: A/H Payne

5 May	Pt Chevalier	16-2	Newton	Fowlds Park, Morningside
3:00	Try: Unknown		Pen: Unknown	Referee: H Tate

==== Round 5 ====
A large attendance was present at Carlaw Park to witness two "Splendidly contested games" in the 5th round. A feature was said to be "the spectacular V for Victory formation by the four senior teams, and, in response to a message by the chairman, Mr. J.W. Watson, the crowd stood in silence in memory of sportsmen who had given their lives in the war". The Auckland Waterside Workers' Band played the American and British national anthems. Rain fell in the late afternoon but did not interfere with the matches. In the first half of the match between Otahuhu and Manukau there were "several instances of weak handling by the Manukau backs" which cost tries. And Otahuhu led 8-5 at the break. In the second half a "fine try by [Royce] Speedy (Otahuhu) changed the whole complexion of the game". Otahuhu began to show superior team work and "time and time again Pita Ririnui led the Manukau forwards, but the Otahuhu defence was equal to the occasion, and the attacks were frustrated". Then late in the game a lucky try to one of the Johnson brothers (Mick) sealed Otahuhu's win. In comments on the individual play the New Zealand Herald wrote "Butler moved to fullback, [and] played an outstanding game. Seymour, the Otahuhu fullback, suffered in comparison. Brady, on the wing, played a splendid game and contributed none of the 20 points scored by Otahuhu. Royce Speedy, five eighths was brilliant at times on attack and was the most impressive of the backs". In the earlier kick off on the number 1 field Ponsonby beat Marist 8 to 7. The match was extremely close and in the final ten minutes "two remarkable goals changed the fortunes. A spectacular field goal by John Anderson placed Marist just one point ahead with five minutes left to play". And then just before full time Brian Nordgren kicked a penalty goal from 40 yards out "amidst applause". For City, their captain, Albert Silva kicked three goals in a 9-5 win over Richmond. Ron McGregor made his first appearance of the season for Richmond after having been injured and scored their lone try with their only other points a penalty by Bernard Lowther. In the game between Ponsonby and Marist, the Marist halfback, Dave McWilliams went off injured while playing halfback. He was replaced by George Tittleton who had previously represented New Zealand but was said to have been fourteen stone and "not so effective in the position". The Auckland Star wrote that Pat Kelly, the rugby centre from Manukau "appears likely to develop into a good attacking back".

12 May	Ōtāhuhu	20-8 (8-5)	Manukau	Carlaw Park 1
3:00	Try: Colin Riley, Royce Speedy, Mick Johnson, H Brady; Con: Colin Riley, H Brady 2 Pen: H Brady		Try: E Pai, Wiremu Te Tai; Pen: Tom Butler	Referee: J O'Shannessey

12 May	Ponsonby	8-7	Marist	Carlaw Park 1
1:40	Pen: Brian Nordgren 4		Try: J Smith; Con: John Anderson; Drop: John Anderson	Referee: H Tate

12 May	City	9-5	Richmond	Carlaw Park 2
3:00	Try: McGee; Pen: Albert Silva 3		Try: Ron McGregor; Pen: Bernard Lowther	Referee: Stuart Billman

12 May	North Shore	15-2	Newton	Carlaw Park 2
1:40	Try: Arthur Read, Eric Chatham, John Rutherford; Con: Roy Clark 2 Pen: Roy Clark		Pen: James Silva	Referee: Jack Hawkes

12 May	Pt Chevalier	7-18	Mt Albert	Walker Park, Pt Chevalier
3:00	Try: Unknown		Try: Unknown	Referee: Ernest Pope

==== Round 6 ====
Round 6 was originally scheduled for May 19 but due to very wet weather the grounds were "sodden" with "large pools of water on the No. 2 ground at Carlaw Park, and the decision was made to postpone the round early on Saturday morning. Derek Hardwick debuted for the Ponsonby senior side at fullback. He had only played one game of rugby league before this and was the younger brother of team mate, Travers Hardwick, who would go on to represent New Zealand.

26 May	Ponsonby	24-6	Manukau	Carlaw Park 1
1:40	Try: Brian Nordgren 3, Pat Kelly 2, Roy Nurse; Con: Brian Nordgren 3		Try: A Rogers, Joe Murray	Referee: J O'Shannessey

26 May	Richmond	20-10 (12-5)	Ōtāhuhu	Carlaw Park 1
3:00	Try: Morrie Robertson, William Kinney, C.W. Williams, Des Ryan; Con: Bernard Lowther 3 Pen: Bernard Lowther		Try: Royce Speedy, H Brady; Pen: Colin Riley 2	Referee: George Kelly

26 May	City	8-4	Pt Chevalier	Carlaw Park 2
1:40	Try: Pouvi (Robert) Salaia 2 Con: Albert Silva		Pen: Morrie Rich 2	Referee: H Hobman

26 May	Marist	11-5	Newton	Carlaw Park 2
3:00	Try: Rangi; Con: John Anderson; Pen: John Anderson 3		Try: Hawkes; Con: Roy Niwa	Referee: Jack Hawkes

26 May	North Shore	12-12	Mt Albert	Devonport Domain
3:00	Try: Unknown		Try: Unknown	Referee: Stuart Billman

==== Round 7 ====
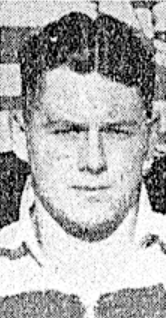
Arthur Kay who came on for Ponsonby to steady the side in their disappointing defeat.

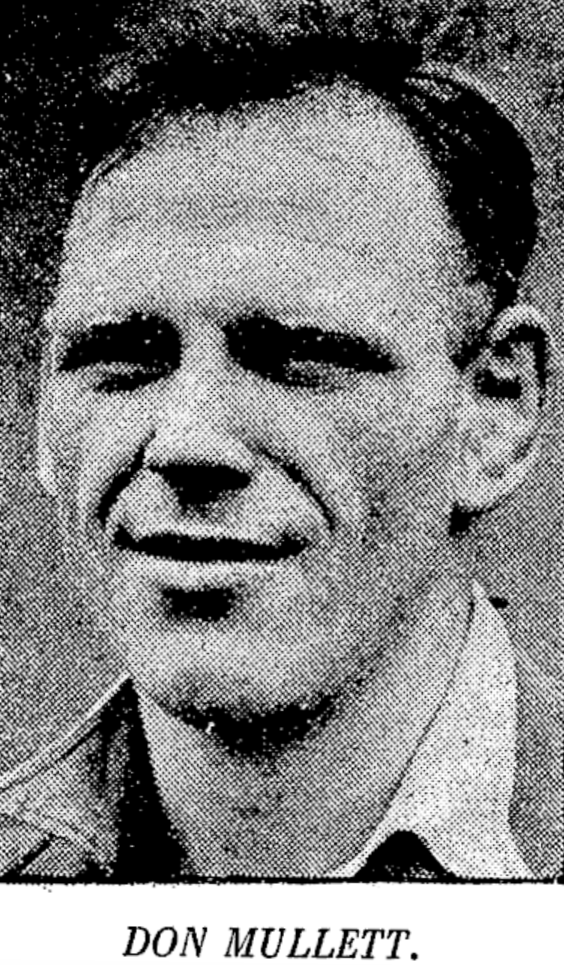
Don Mullett (Ponsonby)

In the match between Richmond and Ponsonby Travers Hardwick and James Morrell both left the field injured for Ponsonby. They were replaced by former New Zealand internationals George Tittleton and Arthur Kay. The main feature of the game was Bernard Lowther scoring three tries and adding five goals for a personal total of 19 points. The New Zealand Herald wrote that the Ponsonby tackling was weak and "the worst seen for some time", especially in the inside backs. Their situation didn't change until the second half when the backs were rearranged. In the first half the game was stopped for several minutes due to injuries to James Morrell and D. Hardwick for Ponsonby who were replaced by Arthur Kay and George Tittleton respectively, Kay moved into the five eighths which improved them but Brian Nordgren barely saw the ball. In Ponsonby's forwards Don Mullett and Darcy Bailey played well. For the winning Richmond side, Ron McGregor "played a splendid game at centre". While Maurie Robertson "showed excellent attacking ability at five eighths". Richmond promoted a junior, G. Prenter who "gave a very impressive display on the wing, showing dash and determination". C. Williams at halfback was replaced by Morris. In their forwards A. Thompson, Frank Hilton, and Des Ryan played well. The curtain raiser on the main field at Carlaw Park was described as a "splendid game" between North Shore and City with North Shore finishing 14-12 winners. The North Shore backs were particularly good with Gamble at full back, three quarters Arthur Reid, Cave, Greenwood, Eric Chatham, and Roy Clark all "playing fine football". Newton played better than previously weeks but a "lack of polish" when they had chances cost them points. Mt Albert let off late in the game allowing Newton to score 13 points. Scarlett, Hawkes, and Niwa were the "best of the Newton backs". Mt Albert dominated the scrums meaning the Newton backs saw little of the ball. For the winners Allan Wiles scored three tries as did D. Pedley, with Basil Cranch converting four of their 10 tries. The Otahuhu forwards dominated Pt Chevalier in an easy 45-13 win. The "country team" was far too experienced "than its younger opponents". Royce Speedy and Colin Riley attacked brightly individually for Otahuhu. For Pt Chevalier Doug Anderson who was possibly on debut at full back "was sound" while Rich and Walker also were prominent. Anderson went on to represent New Zealand in 1947 and 1954, and later played for the Howick and Marist clubs.

2 June	North Shore	14-12	City	Carlaw Park 1
1:45	Try: Arthur Read 2, Cave, Eric Chatham; Con: Eric Chatham		Try: Peter McManus, Alan Legge; Con: Albert Silva 2 Pen: Albert Silva	Referee: Stuart Billman

2 June	Richmond	25-7 (15-5)	Ponsonby	Carlaw Park 1
3:00	Try: Bernard Lowther 3, Ron McGregor, Jack Satherley; Con: Bernard Lowther 3 Pen: Bernard Lowther 2		Try: Travers Hardwick; Con: Brian Nordgren; Pen: Brian Nordgren	Referee: J O'Shannessey

2 June	Mt Albert	38-13	Newton	Carlaw Park 2
1:45	Try: Allan Wiles 3, D Pedley 3, Hubert Borich, Les Clement, S Thomassen, Herbert Zane-Zaninovich; Con: Basil Cranch 4		Try: Tierney, Hawkes, D Muru; Con: Roy Niwa, Walker	Referee: H Tate

2 June	Ōtāhuhu	45-8	Pt Chevalier	Carlaw Park 2
3:00	Try: Royce Speedy 2, Cliff Wellm 2, K Simons 2, Raymond Lohenet, Keat, Ivan Johnson, Norm Johnson, Joffre Johnson; Con: Colin Riley 6		Try: Warner, Wakefield; Con: Warner	Referee: Ernest Pope

2 June	Marist	13-9	Manukau	Fowlds Park, Morningside
3:00	Try: Unknown x 1 Con: John Anderson; Pen: John Anderson 4		Try: Unknown x 1 Con: Unknown x 3	Referee: Jack Hawkes

==== Round 8 ====
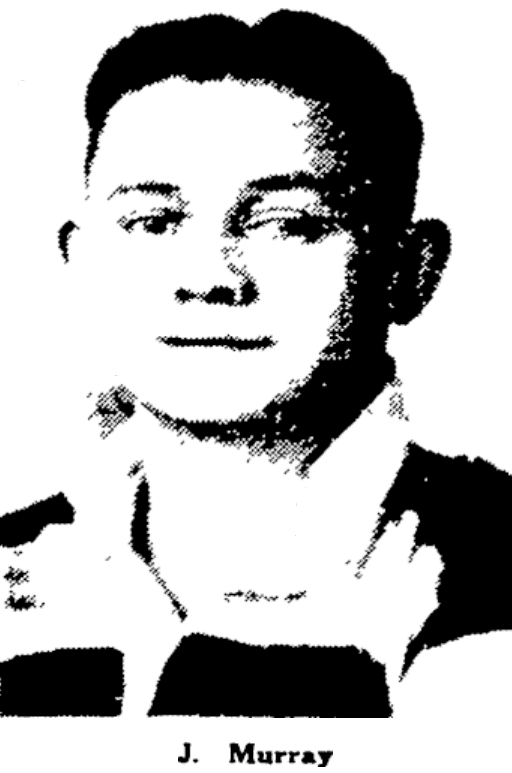
Joe Murray, the Manukau five eighth was the outstanding back on the field.

The early game at Carlaw Park between Richmond and Manukau was described as "a fine display of the code". Joe Murray in the five eighths for Manukau "gave a polished display, and was a tower of strength to his team and he went close to winning the game for Manukau". He was "the best back on the ground, his play at times being brilliant". Jack Major at halfback for Manukau "gave one of the best half-back displays seen at Carlaw Park this season and proved very elusive on attack". Des Ryan, an ex-Auckland rugby union representative played a good game for Richmond "and was the outstanding forward. He was always on the ball, and handled well in the loose". While Ron McGregor, at centre "played splendidly" and he and Ryan "did a lot toward giving Richmond the honours". John Anderson had a very rare off day with the boot for Marist. He missed all 7 shots for goal in a 2-point loss to Mt Albert. The game was said to have been a disappointment with neither side playing particularly well according to the New Zealand Herald. The Marist "backs handled poorly and dropped passes cost tries". A White at five eighth for Marist was accused of paying too much attention to the Mt Albert five eighth Ron Neary by holding on to him off the ball. In the Mount Albert side the reliable Basil Cranch scored all of their seven points with both penalties coming "from wide angles". His try came after Les Clement made an opening for Allan Wiles who "drew his man before sending a long and accurate pass away to his wing. When Cranch got possession, a converging defence was working across, but he went away for the line, and scored by the corner flag". The respective full backs Herbert Zane-Zaninovich (Mt Albert), and Morrie Brockliss (Marist) "had plenty to do, but they rarely started passing bouts". While the Mt Albert forwards were "well led" by Harold Milliken and Clarence Conza who "did some effective work in the loose". In the Marist pack Don McLeod "stood out as easily the best of the Marist forwards". Ponsonby easily beat Point Chevalier by 36 points to 15 though Point Chevalier was said to have played its best game of the season to date and "was unfortunate in not bringing a number of spectacular moves to the scoring point". Brian Nordgren scored three tries for the winners while former New Zealand internationals George Mitchell and Arthur Kay, also crossed. Future international Travers Hardwick was one of their other try scorers. Norgren also added five conversions. Newton gave an improved performance against City and only lost 22-11. The game was close until near the end when City "rattled on the winning points" and Newton mgith have even won had they not "declined two reasonably certain penalty attempts in favour of attacking for the line". For City, Rex Cunningham, Pouvi (Robert) Salaia, and Alan Donovan scored tries while captain Albert Silva had a good day with the boot converting all three tries and adding three penalties. For Newton, D Muru scored their lone try while Walker kicked a conversion and penalty while two other penalties were kicked. Walker at full back was safe, though "was perhaps unwise to try conclusions in kicking bouts with the Auckland representative custodian", namely Warwick Clarke. With Ōtāhuhu's heavy defeat of North Shore at Ellerslie Reserve they passed the 1,000 points scored mark for first grade rugby league matches in the championship. They had first played in the grade in 1914 but struggled during the war years to field competitive teams and it wasn't until the 1943 season that they became properly established again in the top grade.

16 June	Richmond	10-7	Manukau	Carlaw Park 1
3:00	Try: Jack Magill, G Prenter; Pen: Jack Magill, Frank Furnell		Try: Rogers; Con: Tom Butler; Pen: Tom Butler	Referee: Ernest Pope

16 June	Mt Albert	7-5 (4-0)	Marist	Carlaw Park 1
3:00	Try: Basil Cranch; Pen: Basil Cranch 2		Try: W Rangi; Pen: Morrie Brockliss	Referee: George Kelly

16 June	Ponsonby	36-15	Pt Chevalier	Carlaw Park 2
1:45	Try: Brian Nordgren 3, George Mitchell, Arthur Kay, Darcy Bailey, Travers Hardwick, Pat Kelly; Con: Brian Nordgren 5 Pen: Ritchie		Try: Taylor, Dais, Craig; Con: Walker 2 Drop: Harris	Referee: P Bailey

16 June	City	21-11	Newton	Carlaw Park 2
3:00	Try: Rex Cunningham, Pouvi (Robert) Salaia, Alan Donovan; Con: Albert Silva 3 Pen: Albert Silva 3		Try: D Muru; Con: Walker; Pen: Walker, Hawkes + 1 unknown	Referee: C Knott

16 June	Ōtāhuhu	38-15	North Shore	Ellerslie Reserve
3:00	Try: H Brady 2, R Seymour 2, Jack Speedy, Mick Johnson, Joffre Johnson, Ray Halsey; Con: Colin Riley 7		Try: Eric Chatham, Sycamore, Taylor; Con: Bruce Graham, Roy Clark	Referee: J O'Shannessey

==== Round 9 ====
Both Ron McGregor and Bernard Lowther were absent for Richmond however they still managed to defeat Marist 13 to 5. Frank Furnell who had played for Richmond pre-war was at full back, while Jack Magill who had played at full back since 1941 was at centre and he was said to be "solid" with "excellent tackling". On the wing, G. Prenter, a former Air Force rugby player was "creditable" and also kicked two goals. Richmond scored a try to the end of the first half when Maurie Robertson passed to A Thompson to Jack Satherley on to Maurice Potter who scored. In the second half Richmond was on top when A Thompson passed to William Kinney and then Ernie Pinches raced over for the best try of the game. For Marist their forwards "rallied well" with Don McLeod and Curran leading the way. Good play by Rangi in the wing led to Skinner scoring a try to give them a chance but the slippery surface and ball made it difficult with them missing at least two try scoring chances. Newton continued to show improvement but they "tired badly" in the second half and allowed Otahuhu to score 22 points to win 33-2. The Otahuhu backs took a while to "settle down" but then some "bright passing movements" were made involving brothers Royce and Jack Speedy, and Colin Riley, with K. Simons on the wing "also running hard whenever the ball came his way". The main weakness for Newton was said to lay in its backline with Hawkes, their good five eighth not playing. Following City's 7–7 draw they became the first club in senior rugby league in Auckland to pass 6,000 points scored in first grade championship matches. They were said to be lucky to draw after leading 7-0 at halftime. The second half saw Mt Albert totally dominant but offensively and most of the game was fought out on the City try line. Mt Albert turned down two "reasonably certain penalty chances in favour of attacking for the line". Eventually Ron Neary scored to level the scores but Basil Cranch missed the conversion from in front of the posts. Near the end of the game City missed a chance to win the game when Albert Silva "made a brave attempt to place a penalty from wide out, the ball going just wide". Ponsonby beat North Shore 11-5 in the early game on the main field at Carlaw Park. Roy Nurse scored a double for Ponsonby with Roy Gee scoring their other try and Brian Nordgren kicking a penalty. The main factor in their success was said to be their speed with Nurse on the wing using it to score his tries while Pat Kelly also used it to give "easily his best display since coming over to the league code". A criticism of him was that he "made several great openings, but has a tendency to run too far once a scoring chance looks likely". Of the North Shore they were said to be an improved team with not much between them and the other sides. Their forwards in particular "gave a fine display" with Bruce Graham, Tom Field, and Horace Hunt "outstanding". Hunt had been playing seniors for North Shore now for 15 seasons. In the Ponsonby forwards Hermes Hadley, Travers Hardwick, and Dick Hull "were the best of a strong set of forwards".

23 June	Ponsonby	11-5	North Shore	Carlaw Park 1
1:45	Try: Roy Nurse 2, Roy Gee; Pen: Brian Nordgren		Try: Jack Russell-Green; Pen: Roy Clark	Referee: Stuart Billman

23 June	Ōtāhuhu	33-2 (11-2)	Newton	Carlaw Park 2
1:45	Try: K Simons 2, R Seymour 2, Mick Johnson, Jack Speedy, Colin Riley; Con: Colin Riley 5 Pen: Colin Riley		Pen: Walker	Referee: H Hobman

23 June	Richmond	13-5 (6-2)	Marist	Carlaw Park 1
3:00	Try: C.W. Williams, Maurice Potter, Ernie Pinches; Con: G Prenter; Pen: G Prenter		Try: Skinner; Pen: John Anderson	Referee: J O'Shannessey

23 June	City	7-7	Mt Albert	Carlaw Park 2
3:00	Try: Alan Donovan; Con: Albert Silva; Pen: Albert Silva		Try: Ron Neary; Pen: Basil Cranch 2	Referee: Jack Hawkes

23 June	Pt Chevalier	14-12	Manukau	Walker Park, Pt Chevalier
3:00	Try: Barnes 2, Wakefield, Moore; Pen: D Walker		Try: Joe Murray, George Shilton; Con: Tom Butler; Pen: Tom Butler 2	Referee: H Tate

==== Round 10 ====
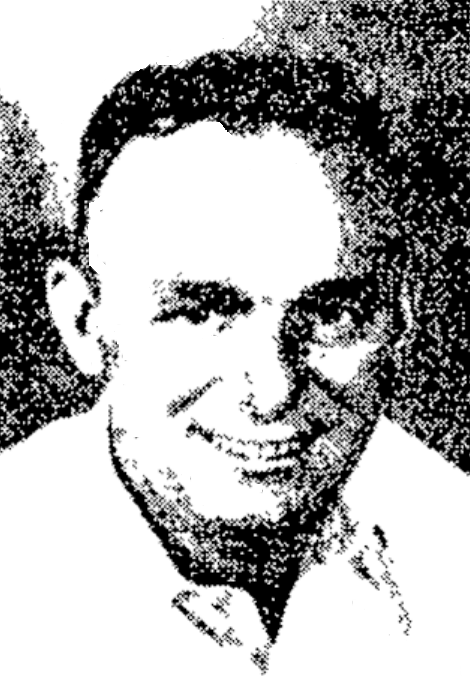
Horace Hunt who was one of the standout forwards for North Shore. He had debuted for them in 1931 and was the Auckland representative wicket keeper at that time.

The Otahuhu club was declared the winner of the Rukutai Shield for being the winner of the most championship points in the first round. The feature match saw Otahuhu outplay Manukau with a dominant first half performance. They led 16-0 at halftime and score a converted try soon after the break to lead by 21 points before Manukau started to throw the ball around and mounted an impressive comeback to lose 21-13. William Topia scored one of their second half tries. He had recently moved to Auckland from the Hokianga District. Topia had served in the war effort and embarked in 1941. He was a prisoner of war at the Stalag VIII-B camp in Poland but was released in late 1943. Otahuhu's backs and forwards were both impressive with Manukau's tackling being described as "poor" and "with the exception of Murray, the backs failed to cover fast enough to check the speed and resource of the Otahuhu set". T. Pai at full back, was "left standing flat-footed when [Royce] Speedy scored a fine try within two minutes of the kick-off". The Otahuhu forwards were led well by Raymond Lohenet and Mick Johnson and they broke through the defence. Jack Speedy then started a passing movement near halfway and R. Seymour "penetrated deeply before passing to Brady, who eluded the defence and sent [Ray] Halsey over for a great try". Lohenet scored himself before the break to give them their large lead. Royce Speedy and K Simons then combined to extend the lead ten minutes into the second spell. The next 20 minutes saw Manukau recover and after "gaining possession from the loose, [Joe] Murray beat the Otahuhu defence and Eugene Opai raced between the posts". They added two more tries and Pita Ririnui and George Shilton "stood out prominently and [Wiremu] Te Tai gained useful ground. Then [Tom] Butler raced away on the Manukau wing but Halsey overhauled him when a try looked certain". Butler converted two of Manukau's tries but missed "several chances from penalties". The moving of Colin Riley from the five eighths to full back for Otahuhu was credited with sharpening up their back play. R. Seymour who played in the five eighths was said to have been nursing a hand injury, while Jack Speedy "played a good game behind the scrum". In their forwards Norm and Mick Johnson "worked hard", while Lohenet "was often prominent in the loose". In Mt Albert's 12-3 win against Pt Chevalier Allan Wiles "played well at centre and [Richard] Shadbolt and Harold Milliken were the best of the forwards". The game was said to have been evenly contested and for Pt Chevalier St John at centre, and Dias at five eighth played "good football". St John was in all of their attacks and "compared favourably with Wiles". Dias "made a few splendid openings and his general play was impressive". In Mt Albert's forwards the standout players were Richard Shadbolt, S. Thomassen, and Harold Milliken. In Ponsonby's 31-15 win over Marist there were 11 points scored in the first half and 35 in the second. Brian Nordgren scored one try by running the full length of the field and converted it from the touch line. Richmond beat Newton comfortably on the number 2 field at Carlaw Park 30 to 10 but bizarrely the newspapers did not report any of the scorers. The Auckland Star said that Bernard Lowther and Maurice Roberston were "particularly prominent". Newton spoiled a hard working performance by infringing around the ruck in the first half which was costly. Walker and Hawkes were their best backs while Jack Silva, Jamieson, and Frank Zimmerman were their best forwards. For City, John James Magee scored a try for them. He had gone to war in 1940 after playing 30 games for City from 1935 to 1940. Magee was also a prisoner of war at Stalag VIII-B like William Topia. They trailed 8-3 at halftime but drew level late in the game but "with a surprise attack" Eric Chatham scored to put North Shore back in front 11-8. Then just before the final whistle Eugene Donovan crossed with Albert Silva's conversion winning the game for City.

7 July	Mt Albert	12-3	Pt Chevalier	Carlaw Park 1
1:45	Try: Richard Shadbolt, S Thomassen; Con: Basil Cranch 2 Pen: Basil Cranch		Try: Dais	Referee: H Payne

7 July	Ōtāhuhu	21-13 (16-0)	Manukau	Carlaw Park 1
3:00	Try: Royce Speedy 2, Ray Halsey, Raymond Lohenet, H Brady; Con: Colin Riley 3		Try: Eugene Opai, Wiremu Te Tai, William Topia; Con: Tom Butler 2	Referee: H Tate

7 July	Richmond	30-10	Newton	Carlaw Park 2
1:45	Try: No Scorers Reported		Try: No Scorers Reported	Referee: S Billman

7 July	Ponsonby	31-15 (7-4)	Marist	Carlaw Park 2
3:00	Try: George Mitchell 2, Roy Nurse, Pat Kelly, Hermes Hadley, Brian Nordgren, Darcy Bailey; Con: Brian Nordgren 3 Pen: Brian Nordgren 2		Try: Don McLeod, Jimmy Matthews, Curran; Con: John Anderson; Pen: John Anderson 2	Referee: Jack Hawkes

7 July	North Shore	11-13 (8-3)	City	Devonport Domain
3:00	Try: Jack Russell-Green, Eric Chatham, Roy Clark; Con: Roy Clark		Try: Harold Gee, John Magee, Eugene Donovan; Con: Albert Silva; Pen: Warwick Clarke	Referee: George Kelly

==== Round 11 ====
The games were "marred" by rain and a heavy ground at Carlaw Park. By the time of the 3pm game the ground was in "its worst state this season and good football was out of the question". The grandstand which had a roof was described as "packed" for the curtain-raiser and main match. In the earlier game Manukau beat Ponsonby 12 to 11 after a comeback from being down by nine points halfway through the second half. The New Zealand Herald wrote that "Ponsonby lost numerous chances of beating Manukau as the result of [Des] Williams using the blindside after the forwards had cleanly hooked the ball". As a result the Ponsonby backs "rarely saw the ball on the open side". Manukau's strong finish saw them "infuse plenty of dash into [their] play and thrilled the crowd with a great recovery". The Manukau forwards "swept over" Ponsonby in the face of a strong wind and "from good passing bouts Kirkwood and [Norman] Shalfoon scored tries... in quick succession". A penalty by Tom Butler then gave Manukau "a popular victory". Butler was said to have been "outstanding" at full back and his omission from the Auckland side was "a surprise". The main match saw Otahuhu beat Mount Albert who had led 2-0 at halftime following a penalty goal to Basil Cranch. The Mount Albert forwards were "superior" but Otahuhu held an advantage in the backs. Mount Albert had a lot of opportunities from the scrums but Ivan Sumich at five eighth "incessantly kicked to no useful purpose". Allan Wiles in the backs for Mount Albert was said to have "often left his position in an effort to secire the ball". For Otahuhu the Speedy brothers. Royce and Jack, "did superior work, which contributed to their success". Colin Riley, who "played a sound game at full back for Otahuhu" kicked a penalty to level the scores at 2-2 and then the game "developed into a duel between the forwards". For Mount Albert Harold Milliken, Richard Shadbolt, and S. Rosewarne "stood out prominently". In the opposition Norm and Mick Johnson and Jim Fogarty gave the backs "excellent support". Otahuhu scored a "splendid try" when Royce Speedy took a pass from his brother Jack and "cut through nicely" before sending the ball on to Brady at centre who then sent it back to Speedy, and then Ray Halsey on the wing "made a fast run to score an excellent try" made more difficult by having to take a slippery ball from "a head high pass". Halsey "showed a lot of his former dash on the wing and Brady did well with limited chances". In the close in positions Royce Speedy "was again elusive on attack" and Jack Speedy "gave good service from the scrum. His defence against a heavy pack was high class". In their forwards Fogarty "was the pick" with Raymond Lohenet and Norm and Mick Johnson "also prominent". For Mount Albert Harold Milliken "played a great forward game". Puti Tipene (Steve) Watene turned out for City for the first time. He had debuted in 1929 for City and played for them until 1935, playing 83 games and scoring 278 points before joining the newly reformed Manukau senior side. He moved to Newton in 1938 briefly before returning to Manukau for the 1939-43 seasons. And then now again returned to City for the remainder of the 1945 season. His forwards were said to have responded in a "determined manner" to his leadership. The star performer for City was Albert Silva who "gave the outstanding individual exhibition" scoring three tries, converting two and adding a penalty for 15 of their 18 points. His third try came after he "followed up a kick of his own from a short distance inside half way". Marist's only try came after J McWilliams at five eighth followed up well to score. In the late match on the number 2 field at Carlaw Park, North Shore narrowly beat Newton 4-3. The forwards were even with Jock Rutherford, the representative hooker doing good work for North Shore. The "churned up ground" made things too much to overcome for both back lines. Newton defended well and occasional "thrusts" by Eric Chatham, Roy Clark, and Arthur Reid "were inevitably stopped". The match between Richmond and Pt Chevalier was played in Mount Wellington in inner east Auckland as an exhibition match. Richmond won 15 points to 7, though like several of the matches played on suburban grounds no individual scoring was reported in the Monday newspapers. R Merrick debuted as a senior grade referee in the game between Newton and North Shore at Carlaw Park.

14 July	Manukau	12-11	Ponsonby	Carlaw Park 1
1:40	Try: Kirkwood, Norman Shalfoon; Con: Tom Butler; Pen: Tom Butler 2		Try: Brian Nordgren 2, Des Williams; Con: Brian Nordgren	Referee: J O'Shannessey

14 July	Ōtāhuhu	7-2 (0-2)	Mt Albert	Carlaw Park 1
3:00	Try: Ray Halsey; Con: Colin Riley; Pen: Colin Riley		Pen: Basil Cranch	Referee: George Kelly

14 July	City	18-9	Marist	Carlaw Park 2
1:40	Try: Albert Silva 3, W Cossey; Con: Albert Silva 2 Pen: Albert Silva		Try: J McWilliams; Con: Morrie Brockliss; Pen: Morrie Brockliss 2	Referee: Jack Hawkes

14 July	North Shore	4-3	Newton	Carlaw Park 2
3:00	Pen: Roy Clark 2		Try: Kean	Referee: R Merrick

14 July	Richmond	15-7	Pt Chevalier	Mt Wellington Reserve
3:00	Try: No scoring reported		Try: No scoring reported	Referee: H Tate

==== Round 12 ====
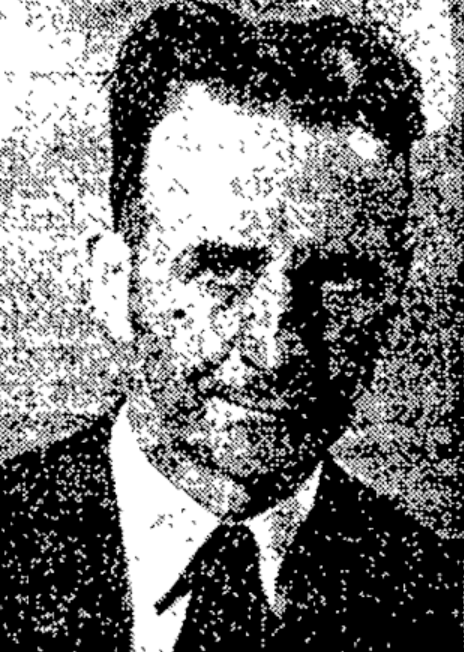
Stuart Billman

Point Chevalier complained about having to play yet another game at a suburban ground. They had only played at Carlaw Park 5 times in 12 games despite 4 games being played there each week out of the 5 regular matches. Three of their suburban games had been on grounds other than their home ground of Walker Park and they were now scheduled to play another suburban game away from Walker Park. The Auckland Rugby League replied that as a new club in first grade they needed to accept the situation. The match between Newton and Marist was played at Fowlds Park in Morningside in a "sea of mud". Newton who had been having a terrible season caused an upset by winning 5–4. Leo Davis made his first appearance for Richmond in the season against Ōtāhuhu. He was an Auckland representative from 1941 to 1943. Royce Speedy was missing for Ōtāhuhu through injury while L Williams for Richmond had to leave the field due to an injury and was replaced by Rennie. Frank Furnell was reported to have played his best game for Richmond since his return from service in the Middle East where he was serving in the war. Forward, Leo Davis played his first game of the season for Richmond after having debuted for them in 1936. Otahuhu fielded all four Johnson brothers (Mick, Joffre, Norm, and Ivan) who were "prominent in the pack". In the same match referee Stuart Billman became the first ever referee in Auckland to officiate 150 senior rugby league games.

28 July	Ponsonby	16-8	City	Carlaw Park 1
1:45	Try: Roy Nurse 2, Brian Nordgren, Des Williams; Con: Brian Nordgren 2		Try: Taylor, Donovan; Pen: Albert Silva	Referee: Jack Hawkes

28 July	Richmond	3-2 (3-2)	Otahuhu	Carlaw Park 1
3:00	Try: Des Ryan		Pen: Colin Riley	Referee: Stuart Billman

28 July	North Shore	10-3	Pt Chevalier	Carlaw Park 2
1:45	Try: Arthur Read, Eric Chatham; Con: Roy Clark; Pen: Roy Clark		Try: St John	Referee: George Kelly

28 July	Manukau	13-12	Mt Albert	Carlaw Park 2
3:00	Try: Ranginui Ewe, Kirkwood, Wiremu Te Tai; Con: Tom Butler; Pen: Tom Butler		Try: Les Clement, Richard Shadbolt; Con: Basil Cranch; Pen: Basil Cranch 2	Referee: H Tate

28 July	Newton	5-4	Marist	Fowlds Park, Morningside
3:00	Try: Vic Belsham; Con: unknown goal		Try: No scoring reported	Referee: Ernest Pope

==== Round 13 ====
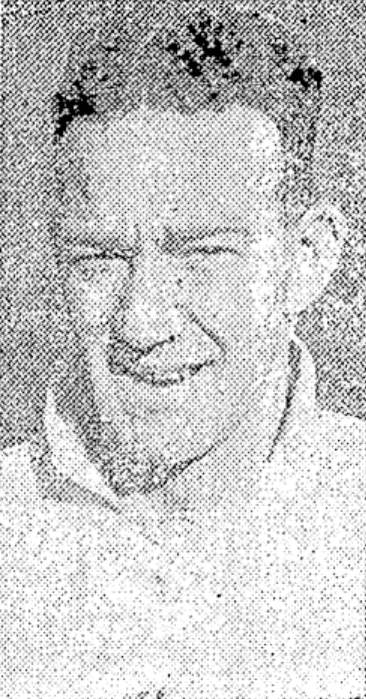
Travers Hardwick (Ponsonby), who was said to have been the best back row forward seen for many years.

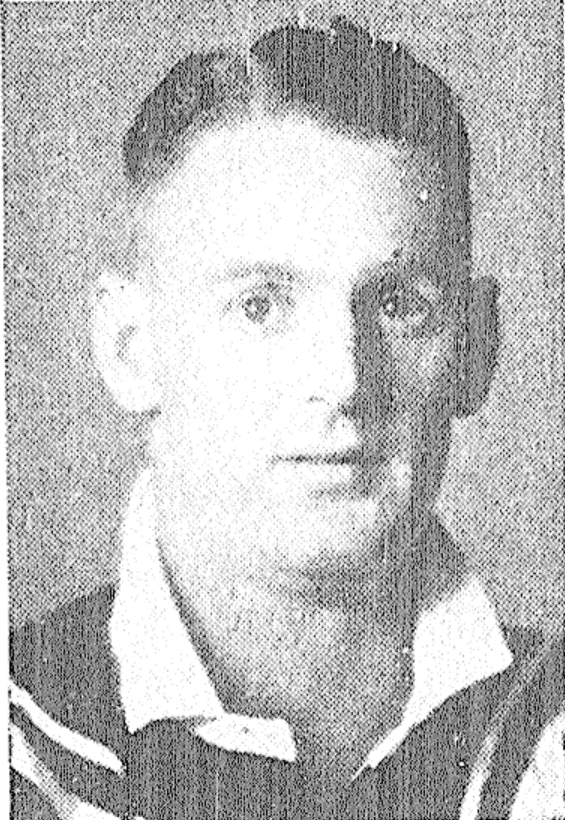
Ivor Stirling turned out for North Shore for the first time since 1939. He had been serving in World War 2 after enlisting in 1940.

Round 13 saw 'Chairman's Round', an initiative started in 1944. The chairman (Mr. J.W. Watson) was given the task of choosing a head to head match up to be the main game at Carlaw Park with Richmond and Manukau selected. Mr. Joseph Patrick Moodabe, who was a well known sportsman had donated a "handsome trophy for the winning side". Richmond was "at the top of its form and the result was never in doubt" in a 11-7 win. However Williams and Robertson were criticised for kicking the ball "almost incessantly in the first spell and scoring chances were lost". An unprecedented situation unfolded following the match when an inquiry was held due to an injury received by former New Zealand international, Jack Satherley who was playing for Richmond. A scrum had been set and he was seen to "reel and fall" and stayed down "on the ground for some time receiving attention" from an apparent headbutt. At the inquiry referee Jack Hawkes and some players gave evidence. After their Wednesday board meeting the Auckland Rugby League suspended Joseph Zimmerman of Manukau for the remainder of the season. Given the referee had not witnessed the incident and no action was taken on the field against him it must have only been through the statements of players that he was found guilty of misconduct which had never happened before in the code in Auckland. Robertson also went off injured in the second half meaning Richmond played with 12 players for half an hour. The Manukau backs saw little of the ball and mostly defended. The Manukau forwards did some good work in the loose and Pita Ririnui nearly scored a try but was stopped by Richmond fullback Jack Magill. Frank Furnell at centre three-quarter and William Kinney were both involved in both of Richmond's first half tries which gave them a 6-2 lead at the break. Then soon after the restart Jack Satherley finished off a passing bout for another try which was converted by Furnell. The Herald then wrote that George Shilton "indulged in a little unnecessary hard play" while the tactics of the Richmond hooker, Ernie Pinches "appeared illegal". Then A. Rogers helped Manukau and Shilton "burst through before passing to Joe Murray, who scored a fine try". Manukau attacked hard at the end but were unable to crack the Richmond defense. The curtain-raiser between Ponsonby and Mt Albert was said to have been one of the best seen at Carlaw Park that season. One of the best players on the field was Pat Kelly, the Ponsonby centre who then moved into the five eighths. When there he made "several brilliant openings, and his try was a fine effort". Roy Nurse and Brian Nordgren used their speed to score two good tries. While in their forwards Travers Hardwick "enhanced his reputation as the best back-row forward seen for many years". He scored a try after running 50 yards. Dick Hull and Moffitt "did splendid work" in their forwards also. For Mt Albert Harold Milliken "was easily the best forward and Jack Zane-Zaninovich and Allan Wiles played well in their backs. At Ōtāhuhu the local team played North Shore and won 18–7. They were missing some of their regular players but fielded D. Smith at fullback. He was the Auckland B grade table tennis champion. In the same match Ivor Stirling, the former New Zealand international made his first appearance of the season at halfback for North Shore. The Shore backs, Roy Clark and Arthur Reid were outstanding, while in the Otahuhu team Hugh Brady and Colin Riley shone. Newton recorded their second consecutive win when they beat City 12-8. Vic Belsham at five eighth and Kean on the wing were key players in their victory, while Elliott at fullback was also said to have stood out. Kean and Belsham scored their tries while George Woolley converted both and added a penalty. In the forwards Jamieson and Walker were their best. The best for City was fullback Warwick Clarke "who was kept busy". Marist had a comfortable win over Pt Chevalier 21 to 8. A feature of the game was said to have been the play of John Anderson in the forwards for Marist against a side he had played for the previous season before returning to Marist where he had debuted in the senior side in 1936 after moving from the West Coast of the South Island. He scored 15 points through a try, two conversions, and four penalties. Anderson and fellow forward George Davidson "were the hardest workers on the ground". Marist attacked throughout the second half and W. Rangi "was prominent in several dashes along the line".

11 August	Richmond	11-7 (6-2)	Manukau	Carlaw Park 1
3:00	Try: Frank Furnell, William Kinney, Jack Satherley; Con: Frank Furnell		Try: Joe Murray; Con: Tom Butler; Pen: Tom Butley	Referee: Jack Hawkes

11 August	Ponsonby	19-10	Mt Albert	Carlaw Park 1
1:45	Try: Travers Hardwick, Pat Kelly, Brian Nordgren, Moffitt, Roy Nurse; Con: Brian Nordgren 2		Try: Jack Zane-Zaninovich, Les Clement; Con: Basil Cranch; Pen: Basil Cranch	Referee: Ernest Pope

11 August	Newton	12-8	City	Carlaw Park 2
1:45	Try: Kean, Vic Belsham; Con: George Woolley 2 Pen: George Woolley		Try: Albert Silva, Rex Cunningham; Con: Alan Donovan	Referee: R Merrick

11 August	Marist	21-8	Pt Chevalier	Carlaw Park 2
3:00	Try: John Anderson, George Davidson, Don McLeod; Con: John Anderson 2 Pen: John Anderson 4		Try: McKinnon, Shirley; Pen: D Walker	Referee: J O'Shannessey

11 August	Ōtāhuhu	18-7	North Shore	Ōtāhuhu
3:00	Try: Hugh Brady 2, Mick Johnson, K Simons; Con: Colin Riley 2 Pen: Colin Riley		Try: Arthur Read; Pen: Roy Clark 2	Referee: Stuart Billman

==== Round 14 ====
The final round of the competition had Richmond sitting on 22 competition points and Otahuhu on 21 points. A win to Richmond would have seen them declared 'minor championship' champions however they lost to Mt Albert 12-7 while Ōtāhuhu beat Marist 10–0 to claim the title. The curtain raiser badly cut up the field for the main match. The New Zealand Herald said that "superior tactics by the Mt Albert forwards carried the day against Richmond" on a chopped up field. They showed excellent ball control and showed rugged tactics in the close play. S Thomassen hooked clean ball for Mt Albert while Harold Milliken "was prominent in the loose". Basil Cranch opened the scoring for Mt Albert with a penalty and then Richard Shadbolt took the ball off a Richmond player in their own in goal and scored with Cranch converting to give them a 7-0 lead. Richmond forwards played better in the second half but Mt Albert were still winning most of the scrum ball and then wild passing by the Richmond backs saw Corbett gain possession and score a try for Mt Albert after he showed "speed and determination". Richmond did well over the remainder of the match with Leo Davis and Maurice Potter associated in a smart attack, and Bernard Lowther on the wing scored a good try which Frank Furnell converted before adding a penalty to reduce the margin to five. For Richmond, their fullback Jack Magill was impressive, fielding the ball faultlessly and kicking powerfully. For Mt Albert Beeston at centre, and Corbett on the wing were also impressive on their senior debuts. Beeston had replaced Allan Wiles who was injured the week prior. Jack Zane-Zaninovich and Ron Neary in the five eighths defended well while Les Clement at halfback was "a tower of strength. Milliken and Shadbolt were the standout forwards with Millken "getting back to his best", and Caples, Fielder and Conza all playing well also. The curtain-raiser between Otahuhu and Marist was said to be disappointing with Otahuhu winning 10-0. Neither team played well as a team and there was little passing on the heavy ground. Jack Speedy, the Otahuhu halfback "played a splendid game and made a number of beautiful openings", two of which gave them their two tries with him scoring one and Mick Johnson the other. Speedy was said to be the best halfback in Auckland on current form. Johnson was the best of the forwards along with Jim Fogarty who was good in the loose. D Smith, the Otahuhu fullback was sound, and R. Keat "did effective work at centre". Ahead of the match Marist's John Anderson, and Otahuhu's Colin Riley were equal with 43 goals each for the season. Anderson did not kick any goals in their loss, while Riley kicked 2 goals in Otahuhu's win thereby giving him the Lance Painter Trophy for goal kicking for the second consecutive season. North Shore beat Manukau 8-0 with tries to Cameron and Jack Russell-Green. Green served his side well at halfback, while Eric Chatham and Roy Clark in the five eighths positions "made a number of fast penetrative moves which would have increased the team's score had not Cameron, on the wing, proved somewhat unreliable in the first half". Manukau missed Joe Murray and had few attacking movements in the backs. Tom Butler and Richard Shalfoon were their back standouts. Ponsonby was far too good for Newton winning 22-2. Newton hung with them for 20 minutes before Ponsonby got on top through their forward play. Arthur Kay and Pat Kelly "supplied the wings, Brian Nordgren and Roy Nurse with several opportunities, all of which were taken advantage of". They each scored a try while Kelly got two himself. Forwards Hermes Hadley scored one and A. Moffitt also scored. The Newton forwards all worked hard while M. Elliott at fullback "gave a particularly good display". The remaining match was played at the Glen Eden Recreation Ground in the West Auckland suburb of Glen Eden, and saw City beat Pt Chevalier 23 to 17 though there was no individual scoring reported.

18 August	Mt Albert	12-7 (7-0)	Richmond	Carlaw Park 1
3:00	Try: Richard Shadbolt, Corbett; Con: Basil Cranch 2 Pen: Basil Cranch		Try: Bernard Lowther; Con: Frank Furnell; Pen: Frank Furnell	Referee: H Payne

18 August	Ōtāhuhu	10-0	Marist	Carlaw Park 1
1:30	Try: Mick Johnson, Jack Speedy; Con: Colin Riley 2			Referee: H Tate

18 August	North Shore	8-0	Manukau	Carlaw Park 2
1:30	Try: Cameron, Jack Russell-Green; Con: Taylor			Referee: Stuart Billman

18 August	Ponsonby	22-2	Newton	Carlaw Park 2
1:30	Try: Pat Kelly 2, Hermes Hadley, Roy Nurse, Brian Nordgren, A Moffit; Con: Brian Nordgren 2		Pen: George Woolley	Referee: J O'Shannessey

18 August	City	23-17	Pt Chevalier	Glen Eden Recreation Reserve, Glen Eden
3:00	Try: No scoring reported		Try: No scoring reported	Referee: George Kelly

=== Major Championship ===
Following the completion of the minor championship rounds Auckland Rugby League played major championship semi finals. This was the first ever time they had done such a thing in the history of the competition and it had an element of being made up as the season went along. Ōtāhuhu were knocked out in the semi finals, and then belatedly later in the season the ARL decided that they, as minor champions would play the winner of the major championship to decide the ARL champion for the season and winner of the Fox Memorial Shield.

==== Semi finals ====
Brian Nordgren continued his record breaking point scoring season with 16 points in Ponsonby's 28–18 win over Otahuhu with 2 tries, 3 conversions and 2 penalties. Veteran player, and former New Zealand international Wally Tittleton played in the unusual position of scrum half for Ponsonby, with Arthur Kay, another former New Zealand representative and long serving Ponsonby player taking the field at first five eighth when he usually played at second five eighth. He was in his 13th season for them and to this point was their second highest ever scorer with approximately 532 points, behind only Frank Delgrosso with 787. Despite the positional changes the Ponsonby back line "went with general smoothness and understanding". Pat Kelly at centre was brilliant and made two weaving runs to score tries. One of them came when forward Dick Hull ran 40 yards before Kelly took the final pass. Kelly was "the outstanding back on the ground" and several times "cut the defence to ribbons with clever footwork and elusive running". Ponsonby's plan of attack was to try to get the ball to Brian Nordgren on the wing and he used his pace to score two tries and also kicked five goals for 16 personal points. One of his tries came when Tittleton made a well directed kick for him. Kay and Ted Allen in the five eighths "were prominent on attack". Tittleton "did his work well" at halfback, while G. Hughes was sound at fullback but did not kick well. In the forwards Travers Hardwick also scored twice in a forward pack which "were very lively in the loose play". For Otahuhu, Colin Riley proved what a good goal kicker he was converting three of their four tries with one from a "difficult angle". Ralph Martin, the former star player for Manukau who had played 97 games for them over six seasons was very good in the five eighths. Hugh Brady in the centre position showed good positional play and defended well while Ray Halsey and K Simons on the wings were "resolute" and ran strongly. In their forwards Dick Hull showed himself to be the best front row forward in Auckland, while A Moffitt and Hermes Hadley also played well. Hadley's brother, Swin Hadley had been a New Zealand rugby union representative in 1928. In the other semi final Richmond won a close match 10-7 over Mt Albert. Richmond was said to be lucky to win with Mt Albert attacking through much of the second half. The Richmond backs were better, having more finish while the Mt Albert forwards outplayed their Richmond opponents. Frank Furnell, the Richmond centre played a "fine game", though Allan Wiles for Mt Albert, back from injury was the best back on the ground.

25 August	Ponsonby	28-18 (12-8)	Otahuhu	Carlaw Park 1
3:00	Try: Pat Kelly 2, Travers Hardwick 2, Brian Nordgren 2 Con: Brian Nordgren 3 Pen: Brian Nordgren 2		Try: Ray Halsey 2, K Simons, Mick Johnson; Con: Colin Riley 3	Referee: George Kelly

25 August	Richmond	10-7	Mt Albert	Carlaw Park 1
1:30	Try: Thomas Rennie, C Williams; Con: Frank Furnell 2		Try: Les Clement; Con: Basil Cranch; Pen: Basil Cranch	Referee: Stuart Billman

==== Final ====
Bernard Lowther, the Auckland representative winger played a fine game on the wing for Richmond and also kicked two excellent goals on a heavy ground. Their only other points came when Thomas Rennie ran hard to the blind side from halfback to score in the corner. Ponsonby's only points came when Brian Nordgren followed up a kick to score. He had an off day as a goal kicker which ultimately cost Ponsonby. In the second half Nordgren and George Mitchell looked to have taken the ball over the line on separate occasions but the referee (J O'Shannessey) ruled otherwise. Ponsonby lost Gerry Hughes, their fullback in the first half, and he was replaced by Derek Hardwick. Fine tackling by Wally Tittleton at five eighths who was renowned for his defensive work in the 1930s checked Pat Kelly from making play for his wings. Richmond attacked well in the second half and Thomas Rennie and brothers, C and L Williams "proved solid on attack".

1 September	Richmond	7-3 (7-0)	Ponsonby	Carlaw Park 1
3:00	Try: Thomas Rennie; Pen: Bernard Lowther 2		Try: Brian Nordgren	Referee: J O'Shannessey

==== Major Championship Final ====
This match was played to find the overall 1945 senior club champion and winner of the Fox Memorial Shield. Otahuhu had won the regular season competition while Richmond had won the 'major championship' playoffs. Auckland Rugby League then decided that these two teams should meet to find the best side. The standard of football was said to have been disappointing. Richmond had been in better form recently but "the team failed badly against the robust and virile Otahuhu forwards". Ron McGregor made a return for Richmond after being out for months injured but his tackling "was weak on occasions". Their only try to Reginald Harkins did however come after McGregor made a solo breakaway. Thomas Rennie played an "outstanding game" for Richmond at halfback but was tackled late by an Otahuhu forward who was "fortunate to escape any penalty". Rennie carried on but lost his sharpness after the incident. Otahuhu led 6-5 at halftime after three penalties from Colin Riley. Evan Pattillo at fullback for Otahuhu was sound "though he lacked the initiative of Frank Furnell on attack". R Keat and K Simons on the wings for Otahuhu "played with plenty of dash, particularly the former, who looks certain to gain representative honours with more experience". He scored their only try of the game. Rennie was said to be the best back on the field and was said to be "the most promising halfback in the code", while in the Richmond forwards Des Ryan and Maurice Potter were the pick.

13 October	Otahuhu	11-5	Richmond	Carlaw Park 1
3:00	Try: R Keat; Con: Colin Riley; Pen: Colin Riley 3		Try: Reginald Harkins; Con: Frank Furnell	Referee: Stuart Billman

=== Roope Rooster ===
==== Round 1 ====
The game between City and Ōtāhuhu was tied at 7–7 at full time. An unprecedented 4 periods of extra time were played of 5 minutes each but no winner was found. It was the only time that many minutes had been played with no victor. Previously 10 minutes extra had been played with no winner but this saw an unprecedented 20 extra minutes. It meant that the two teams had to play a replay the following weekend. The New Zealand Herald said that a draw was a fair result on the run of play. For Otahuhu both wings, Ray Halsey and K Simons "played fine football", and Jack Speedy at halfback gave good service from the base of the scrum. In their forwards Mick Johnson and Sanderson were the best. For City, their fullback Warwick Clarke "played soundly" and F. Simpson on the wing "was prominent on attack". Their forwards Wirepa Jackson, Edward Sexton, and Fred James "worked very well in the loose". Another of the matches also went to extra time with North Shore and Pt Chevalier tied 15–15 at the conclusion. Horace Hunt, North Shore's captain kicked a penalty for North Shore to take the match. In the Point Chevalier side their backs Moore and St. John were the best, while Doug Anderson at fullback who went on to become their first New Zealand representative in 1947 also played soundly. In the North Shore backs representative player Roy Clark "was well in the picture in the first half, but was inclined to be hesitant" in the second half. Mt Albert beat Manukau 18-15 with Basil Cranch contributing 15 of the winners points through three tries, a conversion, and two penalties. D. Pedley on the left wing was "sound" but their other backs were well marked by Manukau's backs. Herbert Zane-Zaninovich, the Mt Albert fullback was kept bust by the speed of the Manukau forwards, Kutia, Rogers, and Kipa. The standout back for Manukau was Joe Murray who "maintained his efforts throughout the game". After the match the Auckland selectors chose Murray for their team to travel to Wellington with team mate Tom Butler also in the side.

1 September	Otahuhu	7-7 (7-7 aet)	City	Carlaw Park 1
1:45	Try: Ralph Martin; Con: Colin Riley 2		Try: F Simpson; Pen: Albert Silva 2	Referee: H Tate

1 September	North Shore	17-15	Pt Chevalier	Carlaw Park 2
1:45	Try: Bruce Graham, Roy Clark, Taylor; Con: Roy Clark 2 Pen: Roy Clark, Horace Hunt		Try: Kirby, St John, Barnes; Con: D Walker; Pen: D Walker 2	Referee: H Payne

1 September	Mt Albert	18-15	Manukau	Carlaw Park 2
3:00	Try: Basil Cranch 3, Hermes Hadley; Con: Basil Cranch; Pen: Basil Cranch 2		Try: T Hira, A Rogers, Joe Murray; Con: Tom Butler; Pen: Tom Butler 2	Referee: Ernest Pope

1 September	Marist	28-9	Newton	Auckland Domain 2
1:45	Try: Evan Hale 2, George Davidson 2, Bren Curran, Don McLeod; Con: John Anderson 4, Morrie Brockliss		Try: George Woolley; Con: George Woolley 2 Pen: George Woolley	Referee: Jack Hawkes

==== Roope Rooster Round 1 Replay (Opai Asher Testimonial) ====
The round 1 replay also doubled as the main match in a testimonial day to Opai (Albert) Asher who had played rugby union (11) and rugby league for New Zealand (7), as well as New Zealand Māori rugby league (22), Auckland (18), and represented the City Rovers from 1910 to 1917 in 53 matches. He later became the custodian of Carlaw Park but was retiring to return to his home area of Tauranga. He paraded in red and black (City's colours) and kicked off. City won 13 to 10 and showed more constructive play. Ray Halsey on the right wing for Otahuhu made some strong runs, but the ball rarely got past Cliff Wellm in the five eighths after it was sent to him by Jack Speedy. At fullback for City Warwick Clarke played "another of his typically polished games". In the second half Otahuhu's forwards "worked strenuously and the side might have won had Colin Riley been available. His goal kicking was missed and R. Seymour "muffed" several easy penalties. The side also shuffled around positions following injuries to A. Portello who hadn't played since the early rounds of the championship at fullback, and Ralph Martin in the five eighths. R Seymour, usually a second row forward, though he had experience in the outside backs came on to play at fullback, while D. Harris a forward came on to the wing and Norm Johnson moved from the forwards to five eighths. In their forwards Jim Fogarty, Hardy, and N. Sanderson were prominent while Fred James, and George Bodman "were outstanding" for City. There were also two curtain-raisers played between City and Glenora 3rd grade sides (won 13–6 by City), and the City and Pt Chevalier 4th grade teams (won 19–4 by Pt Chevalier). The main match saw City win 13–10. Otahuhu lost A. Portello and Ralph Martin in the first half, meaning R. Seymour had to play fullback and D Harris, a forward, moved to the wing. Norm Johnson, another forward shifted to five eighth.

8 September	City	13-10	Ōtāhuhu	Carlaw Park 1
3:00	Try: F Simpson 2, Sumich; Con: Albert Silva; Pen: Albert Silva		Try: Jim Fogarty, Sanderson; Con: Sanderson; Pen: R Seymour	Referee: Stuart Billman

==== Roope Rooster Round 2 ====
With his 7 points in Ponsonby's 19–13 loss to Mt Albert, Brian Nordgren passed Jack Hemi's point scoring record of 218 points which he achieved in 1941 through 208 points for Manukau, and 12 for Auckland. Nordgren moved to 227 points. Flags flew at half mast at Carlaw Park due to the death of Mr. G.J. Chapman, who was a life member of the Ellerslie club, and Tumorehu (Wiremu Lou) Hemi the younger brother of Jack who died on September 9 in Wellington aged just 18. He had played for Wellington with Jack against Auckland on July 21 at Carlaw Park. He was said to have been not well before the game and at half time had to obtain medical attention. After returning to Wairarapa, where he was from he entered Masterton Hospital and ultimately did not recover. In Richmond's match with Marist, 36 year old former international George Tittleton was concussed with a possible fractured jaw and was taken to Auckland Hospital. He was replaced by veteran player Dacre Black who had debuted for the Ponsonby senior side in 1936. The injury occurred after the Mount Albert forwards Harold Milliken, Fielder, and Rhodes had raced into the Ponsonby half. Soon after Brian Nordgren missed the ball on the full and Les Clement, the Mount Albert representative half back "raced over to score an easy try between the posts". Over the next period of play there was a lot of referee whistle for scrum infringements which slowed down the game. Good passing from Mount Albert and "excellent positional play" by their backs resulted in Allan Wiles scoring again. When the teams came out for the second half Beeston came on for D. Pedley on the wing. Then Arthur Kay made an opening and ran 50 yards before "snappy passing" saw Nordgren score. Kay was said to have "played a splendid constructive game, and his ability to make a pap, and give Ponsonby the only real chance it had, was a highlight of the match". Mount Alberts backs again attacked well and Wiles scored his second try with Ron Neary showing "fine initiative in the movement". Kay was the spearhead of a Ponsonby attack which led to Roy Nurse using his speed to score. For Mount Albert, Herbert Zane-Zaninovich played a sound game at fullback and his tackling was solid. Allan Wiles in the five eighths played easily his best game for some time and was a thorn in the side of the opposition" according to the New Zealand Herald. Ron Neary at centre played "very ably... and showed fine judgement at centre". Basil Cranch proved a match winner once again kicking five goals. In a summary of the game the Herald said that Les Clement gave good service at half back, while Richard Shadbolt, Harold Millken, Rhodes, and Fielder "did fine work among the forwards". In Richmond's 18-12 win over Marist Bradley and Gordeon Prenter on the wings were "impressive". And Thomas Rennie at halfback "played a great game, and his service from the scrum started two of the tries scored". In their forward Des Ryan, A Thompson and Leo Davis played well, with Maurice Potter being versatile and assisting the backs. Jimmy White at five eighth for Marist "played a splendid game" while Evan Hale at halfback showed "a lot of promise", and in the forwards Don McLeod, George Davidson, and Lyall played well.

15 September	Mt Albert	19-13 (10-5)	Ponsonby	Carlaw Park 1
3:00	Try: Allan Wiles 2, Les Clement; Con: Basil Cranch 3 Pen: Basil Cranch 2		Try: Brian Nordgren, Roy Nurse, Dacre Black; Con: Brian Nordgren 2	Referee: George Kelly

15 September	Richmond	18-12	Marist	Carlaw Park 1
1:45	Try: Bradley 2, Gordon Prenter, Leo Davis; Con: Frank Furnell 3		Try: White, Simpson; Con: Morrie Brockliss 2 Pen: Morrie Brockliss	Referee: Ken McIvor

==== Roope Rooster Semi-Finals ====
North Shore were said to have fielded their best team of the season after being reinforced by Verdun Scott who had returned from the war. He had been selected for New Zealand for the aborted tour of England and France in 1939. In 1946 he would become the first and only player to also play test cricket for New Zealand when he debuted against Australia on March 29, 1946. Joining him in the side were other former New Zealand players Jack Smith, and Ivor Stirling. The Auckland Rugby League advertised that they were fielding eight representative players. In addition to Scott, Smith, and Stirling they were also playing Bruce Graham, and Roy Clark who would go on to represent New Zealand and Horace Hunt, Jock Rutherford and Thomas Field who had all played for Auckland. One of their other five players who was on debut was Les Pye who would also represent New Zealand in 1947. Smith converted 2 of their 3 tries and also kicked 2 penalties in their 17–12 win. Jock Rutherford and S. Thomassen the respective hookers were evenly matched. Many critics regarded Thomassen as being the best hooker in rugby league at the present time. North Shore were better in the open play with Bruce Graham and Thomas, a new rugby recruit playing "outstanding games". Ivor Stirling beat the defence in one movement and passed to Thomas who raced past several defenders to score and Thomas was again involved when he ran 40 yards before sending Tom Field over. Smith at fullback "revealed a lot of his former ability, but he did not overshadow Herbert Zane-Zaninovich who also played a splendidly". Eric Chatham was "the best back on the ground, and his straight running turned defence into attack". In Richmond's 9-7 win over City, Thomas Rennie at halfback, who was a recently promoted junior "gave a high class display, and his service from the base of the scrum paved the way for two tries. His own try was a brilliant effort". City introduced two new players, G. Cunningham at centre played well and he scored a good try, while Morris who was a 15 stone forward "went well for 20 minutes" before he retired with a head injury. The Auckland Star wrote that it "was a pity [Albert] Silva did not stick to the goal kicking instead of giving chances to [Warwick] Clarke and [Alan] Donovan". As there were four missed kicks from "easy positions".

22 September	Richmond	9-7	City	Carlaw Park 1
1:45	Try: Bernard Lowther, Thomas Rennie, Frank Furnell		Try: G Cunningham; Pen: Albert Silva 2	Referee: J O'Shannessey

22 September	North Shore	17-12 (9-7)	Mt Albert	Carlaw Park 1
3:00	Try: Arthur Read, Thomas, Thomas Field; Con: Jack Smith 2 Pen: Jack Smith 2		Try: Richard Shadbolt, D Pedley; Con: Basil Cranch 2 Pen: Basil Cranch	Referee: Jack Hawkes

==== Roope Rooster final ====
Jack Smith kicked 5 goals in North Shore's 22–12 win. He played a "faultless game at fullback" though had to leave the field during the second half when he was injured. Roy Clark also scored 2 tries for the winners in a match described by chairman J.W. Watson as being "the best game seen at Carlaw Park for a long time". The North Shore backs played with "rhythm and understanding" but it was their forwards who did all the hard work with strong scrumming and hunting round the field "with great dash and speed". Jock Rutherford, the representative hooker gave Ivor Stirling "a running rein" at halfback. Bruce Graham the former Hawkes Bay player, Les Pye, and Thomas all stood out with Thomas showing "real brilliance at times, handled splendidly and was sharp at taking the gap". North Shore led 14-0 at halftime but Richmond fought back well to nearly level the scores before Shore dominated the final 15 minutes to extend their lead.

29 September	North Shore	22-12 (14-0)	Richmond	Carlaw Park 1
3:00	Try: Roy Clark 2, Arthur Read, Thomas; Con: Jack Smith 2 Pen: Jack Smith 3		Try: R.P. Smythe, Jack Satherley; Con: Frank Furnell 2 Pen: Frank Furnell	Referee: J O'Shannessey

==== Stormont Shield final ====
North Shore claimed the champion of champions title for 1945 when they beat Ōtāhuhu in the Stormont Shield final. C.S Peterson, the representative forward turned out for North Shore after returning recently from the war effort. North Shore led at halftime 15–5 after playing with a strong wind, however Otahuhu came back strongly with two tries including one to Jim Fogarty on full time. Unfortunately for the south Auckland team Colin Riley's conversion attempt which caused the crowd to gather near the posts missed. During the second half Joffre Johnson was sent off for Otahuhu at a stage when they were getting on top. Jack Smith played well in the first half but not so good in the second. Eric Chatham at second five eighth for North Shore was the best of the backs and "made many clever openings". Roy Clark was solid and his defence saved two tries. Ivor Stirling at halfback "was a tower of strength", while Verdun Scott at centre "was also prominent". Clarrie Peterson was always dangerous in the forwards and Thomas also "put in several spectacular runs which aroused some excitement" from the large crowd. Thomas Field was also said to have played well. For Otahuhu their wings R Keat and K Simons stood out. Colin Riley kicked well and from one effort near halfway he hit the post. Jim Fogarty and Joffre Johnson played well amongst "a fine set of forwards". After winning the match each member of the North Shore side was presented with a medal by the family of William (Bill) Stormont whom the trophy was in honour of.

20 October	North Shore	15-13 (15-5)	Otahuhu	Carlaw Park 1
3:00	Try: Arthur Read, Eric Chatham, Roy Clark; Con: Jack Smith 2 Pen: Jack Smith		Try: Joffre Johnson, Colin Riley, Jim Fogarty; Con: Colin Riley; Pen: Colin Riley	Referee: Jack Hawkes

==== Phelan Shield round 1 ====
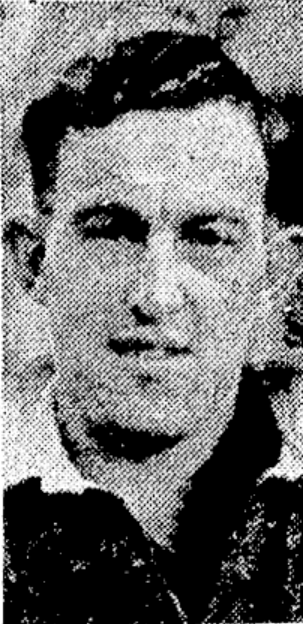
Doug Anderson (rugby league) (Point Chevalier) who represented New Zealand in 1947.

15 September	Pt Chevalier	8-2	Newton	Carlaw Park 2
1:45	Try: St John, Doug Anderson; Con: D Walker		Pen: George Woolley	Referee: H Payne

==== Phelan Shield Round 2 ====
Point Chevalier were said to have played their best game of the season in a big upset victory over Otahuhu. Otahuhu was below full strength but not by much and their forwards were "sluggish" compared to Point Chevaliers. Barnes, Shirley, and McKinnon "were prominent". Their backs were also better with much owed to the full back play of Doug Anderson, Harford at halfback and D. Walker on the wing who played a "rugged" game. Ponsonby eliminated Marist with a 17-13 win. Marist held a territorial advantage but could not finish against a good Ponsonby defence. Brian Nordgren was in top form and scored three tries along with kicking a conversion. Pat Kelly at centre played an "intelligent" game.

22 September	Pt Chevalier	19-11	Otahuhu	Carlaw Park 2
1:45	Try: Barnes 2, D Walker, Kirby, McKinnon; Con: D Walker; Pen: D Walker		Try: Colin Riley, Jack Speedy, Jim Fogarty; Con: Hugh Brady	Referee: Stuart Billman

22 September	Ponsonby	17-13	Marist	Carlaw Park 2
3:00	Try: Brian Nordgren 3, Pat Kelly, Edwin Kay; Con: Brian Nordgren		Try: Jimmy Matthews, Don McLeod, Morrie Brockliss; Pen: Morrie Brockliss; Drop: John Anderson	Referee: K.D. McIvor

==== Phelan Shield Semi Finals ====
Referee A Stevenson officiated in his debut first grade match in the Pt Chevalier game against Ponsonby. Ponsonby was missing 5 players who were playing for the Auckland representative side but still managed to win 22 to 12 after the scores had been tied 12-12 at the end of the game with extra time needing to be played. Arthur Kay and Ted Allen were Ponsonby's best while Doug Anderson at fullback for Point Chevalier along with Harford (halfback), and Shirley, Barnes, and McKinnon in the forwards were "impressive". In the other match City beat Mt Albert 25-5 with both teams missing three players each to the Auckland side.

29 September	Ponsonby	22-12	Pt Chevalier	Carlaw Park 2
1:45	Try: Des Williams 3, Norton, Allen, H Thomas; Con: Dacre Black 2		Try: Shirley 2, D Walker, Perry	Referee: A Stevenson

29 September	City	25-5	Mt Albert	Carlaw Park 2
3:00	Try: V Fredatovich, Keenan, Alan Donovan, Woods, Albert Silva; Con: Albert Silva 4 Pen: Albert Silva		Try: Fielder; Con: Basil Cranch	Referee: George Kelly

==== Phelan Shield Final ====
Ponsonby won the Phelan Shield for the third time following previous wins in 1935 and 1935. Their points came from prolific try scorer Brian Nordgren who scored one of their three tries, the others going to Travers Hardwick, and Owen Hughes. Nordgren also kicked two conversions and a penalty. It was Nordgrens last ever game for Ponsonby as he signed a deal with Wigan and spent the rest of his playing career in England. He played 294 games for Wigan, scoring a remarkable 312 tries. He later returned to New Zealand and coached Ponsonby. City trailed by 11 points late in the second half but rallied to make the game close. For City George Bodman scored twice with Masters getting their other try. Lonergan converted two and Albert Silva kicked a penalty.

20 October	Ponsonby	18-15	City	Carlaw Park
1:40	Try: Brian Nordgren, Travers Hardwick, Owen Hughes; Con: Brian Nordgren 2 Pen: Brian Nordgren		Try: George Bodman 2, Masters; Con: Lonergan 2 Pen: Albert Silva	Referee: A Stevenson

=== Top try scorers and point scorers ===
The try and point scoring lists were compiled from Fox Memorial, Roope Rooster, Phelan Shield, and Stormont Shield matches. The scoring includes Fox Memorial matches including the playoff type matches, the Roope Rooster and Phelan Shield competitions and also the Stormont Shield final. It does not include the exhibition matches that Otahuhu played in the West Coast or the match between Ponsonby and Mt Albert at Cambridge on October 13. There were several matches which were played on suburban grounds which had little or no reporting and no scoring lists. The Point Chevalier side was particularly affected by this.

Top try scorers
Rk	Player	Team	Games	Tries
1	Brian Nordgren	Ponsonby	19	22
2	Bernard Lowther	Richmond	17	13
3=	Roy Nurse	Ponsonby	19	11
3=	Pat Kelly	Ponsonby	18	10
3=	Arthur Read	North Shore	17	10
6=	Hugh Brady	Otahuhu	16	8
6=	Travers Hardwick	Ponsonby	19	8
8=	Mick Johnson	Otahuhu	19	7
8=	Royce Speedy	Marist	11	7
10=	Eric Chatham	North Shore	18	6
10=	Joe Murray	Manukau	14	6
10=	Albert Silva	City	18	6
10=	Jack Smith	Marist	16	6
10=	Cliff Wellm	Otahuhu	12	6
10=	Allan Wiles	Mt Albert	17	6
10=	K Simons	Otahuhu	16	6
10=	Ray Halsey	Otahuhu	8	6

Top point scorers
Rk	Player	Team	G	T	C	P	DG	Pts
1	Brian Nordgren	Ponsonby	19	22	29	15	0	154
2	Colin Riley	Otahuhu	19	3	39	15	0	117
3	Basil Cranch	Mt Albert	19	5	22	20	0	99
4	John Anderson	Marist	17	2	17	24	2	92
5	Albert Silva	City	18	6	16	18	0	86
6	Bernard Lowther	Richmond	17	13	16	7	0	85
7	Roy Clark	North Shore	18	5	9	10	0	53
8	Frank Furnell	Richmond	18	4	14	3	0	46
9	Tom Butler	Manukau	14	1	12	9	0	45
10	Hugh Brady	Otahuhu	16	8	3	3	0	36

== Other notable senior level matches ==
=== Jimmy Chalmers Benefit Match ===
Robert Grotte made his first appearance of the season for the Town side.

On June 4 a benefit match was arranged for former Marist player James (Jimmy) Chalmers. He had played for their senior side from 1935 to 1940 before enlisting in the armed forces. He was seriously wounded in the Middle East and had his leg amputated at the hip. The match was played between a Town side made up of players from the Marist and City clubs and a Country side made up of players from Ōtāhuhu and Manukau. Robert Grotte made his first appearance for the year in the Town side "and showed a cleverness at opneing up the play". Before a "good attendance" the Town side won narrowly. Ralph Martin gave a "clever exhibition of positional play and often ran his backs into attacking position". Robert Salaia, Fred James, Dave McWilliams also gave good performances in their backs. For the country side the interest "largely centred in the appearance of Royce Speedy and Joe Murray, who have been chosen as the five-eighth line for Auckland representative team". While on the wing Tom Butler "was the outstanding wing of the match".

4 June	Town (Marist & City)	21-19 (15-8)	Country (Ōtāhuhu & Manukau)	Carlaw Park
3:00	Try: Fred James, Jimmy Matthews, John Anderson, Don McLeod 2 Con: John Anderson 3		Try: James Speedy, Wiremu Te Tai, Tom Butler, K Simons 2 Con: Tom Butler 2

=== Inter-Port Challenge Cup ===
On September 26 the Auckland Watersiders played in an Inter-Port Challenge Cup match against the Wellington Watersiders at Carlaw Park. The Auckland side were the current holders and they retained the Cup with a 14–6 win which included the clinching try late in the match to representative player John Anderson. A curtain-raiser was played between another Auckland Waterside team and Glenora.

26 September	Auckland Watersiders	14-6	Wellington Watersiders	Carlaw Park
3:00	Try: McNeil, John Anderson; Con: Albert Silva 2 Pen: Albert Silva 2		Try: Ward, Kenny

=== Ōtāhuhu tour of the West Coast ===
The Ōtāhuhu senior side travelled as a party of 23 to the West Coast to play 2 matches against very strong opponents. Otahuhu was coached by Con Hall who was formerly of Greymouth. They were at full strength except that Ralph Martin replaced the injured Royce Speedy at full back. Ōtāhuhu arrived on Thursday, September 27 and departed on October 2. They were officially welcomed at the Trotting Pavilion on the evening of the 27th and an official dinner was held on the 30th following their second match. A welcome dance was held for them on the Saturday night also, at the Miners' Hall. They lost both of them to Blackball, the local champions, and then Runanga. After the match with Blackball their opponents travelled to Auckland as the majority of them were in the South Island side to play the North Island. Following their second match, against Runanga, the team was hosted by the West Coast Rugby League at the Club Hotel for a dinner.

==== Blackball v Ōtāhuhu ====
The Blackball side featured future New Zealand internationals Bill Mountford, Bob Aynsley, Charlie McBride, Ray Nuttall, Ken Mountford, and Ces Mountford who signed with Wigan two months later. Amazingly the score was 5-5 at halftime before the Blackball side totally dominated the second half. E McManus who was playing soundly in the five eighths was injured and Evan Pattillo came on to replace him, moving to fullback with Colin Riley going up into the five eighths.

29 September	Blackball	39-10 (5-5)	Ōtāhuhu	Blackball Domain, Blackball
2:30	Try: Charlie McBride, Bill Mountford, Ces Mountford 2, J McNaughton, W Kirk, Micky Ord, Ken Mountford, Wright; Con: Ray Nuttall 4, Ces Mountford; Pen: Ray Nuttall		Try: R Keat, Ralph Martin; Con: Colin Riley 2	Referee: J Quinn

==== Runanga v Ōtāhuhu ====
Runanga led 7-5 at halftime before clearing out to win more comfortably. Prop, John Newton scored a try and kicked two conversions and a penalty for the winners. He was selected for New Zealand in 1946. Otahuhu's only points came from a Jack Speedy try after Ray Halsey who had come on to replace the injured K Simons had put in a centering kick which Jim Fogarty caught before throwing a long pass to Speedy who crossed. The try was converted by Colin Riley who also kicked a second half penalty. Riley who had started at full back moved to five eighth, switching with D. Smith and they played better after this. The Runanga forwards however started to win more ball from the scrums and their backs started to make breaks leading to tries.

30 September	Runanga	20-7 (7-5)	Ōtāhuhu	Wingham Park, Greymouth
2:45	Try: R Dalzell, John Newton, N McTigue, R Coppersmith; Con: J Soster, John Newton 2 Pen: John Newton		Try: Jack Speedy; Con: Colin Riley; Pen: Colin Riley	Attendance: 1,500; Referee: J Griffen

=== Ponsonby v Mount Albert (exhibition match in Cambridge) ===
On October 13 the Ponsonby and Mt Albert senior sides played an exhibition match at Victoria Square in Cambridge, Waikato. It was the first rugby league game played in Cambridge for 22 years. A crowd of 800 paid for admission to witness the match which was won by Ponsonby 40 to 28. Frank Delgrosso coached the Ponsonby side as he had done during the season and his son, Francis (also known as Frank) possibly made his debut for Ponsonby. "K Hardrave" was listed as coaching the Mt Albert side which was possibly Roy Hardgrave as there were several spelling errors in the article. Brian Nordgren scored a try and kicked 7 conversion and a penalty, while for Mt Albert, Basil Cranch converted 5 of their 6 tries. A local league committee had organised the match along with the two Auckland clubs and the Frankton club. Following the match the teams were entertained at the Oddfellows' Hall in Cambridge. The following day on Sunday the Auckland sides were taken to visit the Karapiro Hydro Works and then traveled to the Frankton Club. The match raised money for the "Kiwi" Flats fund and gathered £40-£50.

13 October	Ponsonby	40-28 (20-13)	Mt Albert	Victoria Square, Cambridge
3:00	Try: Brian Nordgren, T Allen 3, Francis Delgrosso, Dick Hull, A Moffitt 2 Con: Brian Nordgren 7 Pen: Brian Nordgren		Try: Montague, Les Clements 3, Allan Wiles, Rhodes; Con: Basil Cranch 5	Referee: G Kelly

== Lower grades ==
=== Senior B ===
Newton, North Shore, City, Pt Chevalier, Mt Albert, Marist, Manukau, North Shore, Ellerslie, Papakura, and Otahuhu.

=== 3rd Grade ===
Won by City Rovers. Other competing teams included Ellerslie, Richmond, Ponsonby, and Marist.

=== 4th Grade ===
Won by Mount Albert United.

=== 5th Grade ===
Won by Point Chevalier. Other competing teams included Ellerslie and Ōtāhuhu.

=== 6th Grade ===
Won by Green Lane.

=== 7th Grade ===
Won by Marist Old Boys. Other competing teams included Ellerslie, Marist, and Newton.

=== Schoolboys ===
==== Seniors ====
Ellerslie, Green Lane, Richmond, Mount Albert, and Newton

==== Intermediate ====
Ellerslie, Point Chevalier, and Richmond

==== Juniors ====
Ellerslie, Ōtāhuhu, Glenora, and Richmond

==== Seven-a-side competition ====
Mount Albert, Manukau, City, Ponsonby, Richmond A, Richmond B, Newton, Point Chevalier, Marist, and Ōtāhuhu.

== Representative season ==
=== Representative matches ===
==== Auckland v South Auckland (Waikato) ====
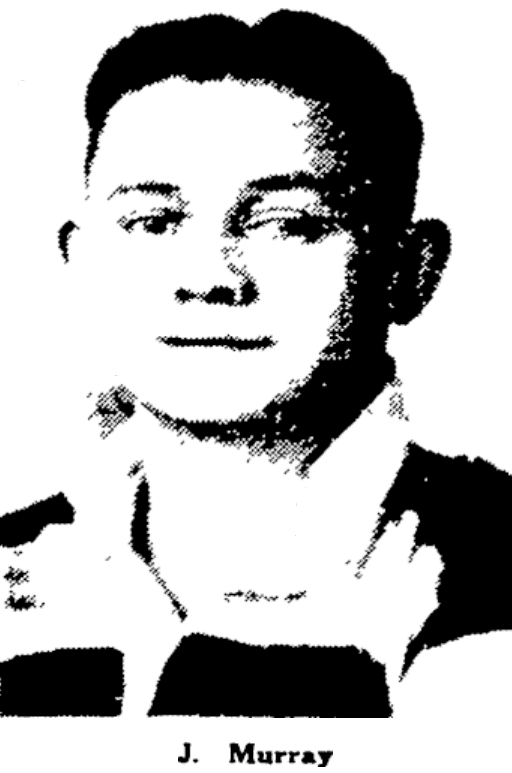
Joe Murray

Auckland won comfortably with an extraordinary performance by winger Brian Nordgren who scored 5 tries and kicked 5 goals for 25 individual points. Bernard Lowther played on the other wing and kicked 3 conversions before retiring injured and being replaced by Roy Nurse. The South Auckland side was missing L. Allen through injury and then Owen Brookes, their star back was forced off through injury. Future New Zealand representative Albert Hambleton played at prop for South Auckland. N Dowling, who had played for Richmond in 1944 also turned out for the visiting side. In a curtain raiser the South Auckland 4th grade representative side beat Auckland 6 to 3.

9 June	Auckland	46-7	South Auckland (Waikato)	Carlaw Park 1
3:00	Try: Brian Nordgren 5, Travers Hardwick 2, Royce Speedy 2, Joe Murray; Con: Brian Nordgren 4, Bernard Lowther 3 Pen: Brian Nordgren		Try: N Healey; Con: W Opai; Pen: Owen Brookes	Referee: H Tate

==== Huntly District v Auckland Māori ====
Ernie Asher selected the Auckland Māori team. At the conclusion of the game at a social function life membership was conferred to Brownie Paki. Heavy rain ruined the game somewhat but it was still a "strenuous and well contested football" match. Joe Murray and D. Pedley on the wing "played splendid games for the Maori team, while Kirkwood, at centre, was always prominent on attack". Tom Butler played "a fine game". In their forwards Pita Ririnui was the best on the ground and Frank Hilton "also did effective work". For Huntly R. Stevens at full back for Huntly and L. Williams and Albert Hambleton "were the pick of the forwards".

24 June	Huntly District	14-16	Auckland Māori	Davies Park, Huntly
3:00	Try: L Williams 2 Con: R Stevens 2 Pen: R Stevens 2		Try: Joe Murray, Kirkwood, D. Pedley 2 Con: Tom Butler 2

==== Auckland Māori v Auckland Pākehā ====
The match was to raise money for the injured players fund and secured about £360 for it. A feature of the match was the goal kicking on each side. For the Māori team Silva kicked 5 goals, while Brian Nordgren did likewise for the Pākehā team. Nordgren also scored a try from halfway after Allan Wiles had made a "brilliant burst down the middle of the field" to create an overlap for his winger. The Māori team found themselves down by 15 points in the second half before a strong comeback made the game close following a try to Pita Ririnui with 10 minutes to go. Then with 5 minutes left Joe Murray came close to leveling the scores but the Pākehā defence hung on for the win.

30 June	Auckland Pākehā	19-16	Auckland Māori	Carlaw Park 1
3:00	Try: Allan Wiles, Brian Nordgren, Don McLeod; Con: Brian Nordgren 3 Pen: Brian Nordgren 2		Try: George Mitchell, Pita Ririnui; Con: James Silva 2 Pen: James Silva 3	Referee: Stuart Billman

==== Auckland v Wellington ====
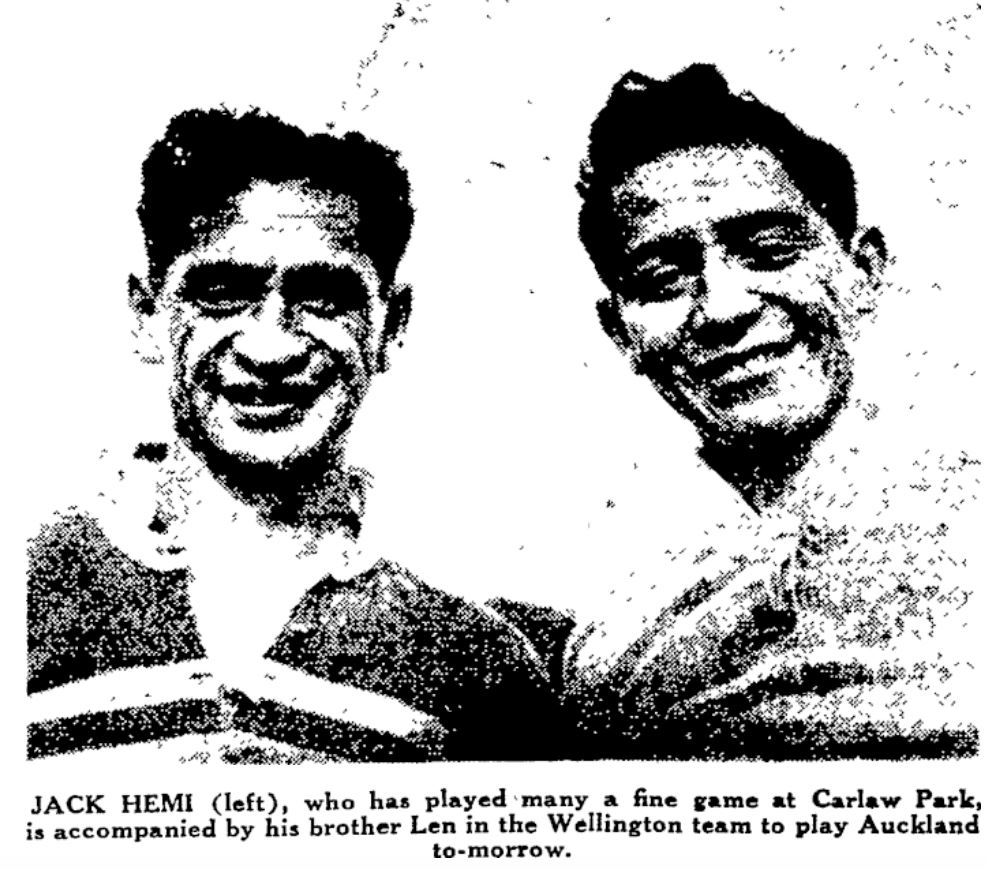
Jack Hemi and his brother Lou, of the Wellington rugby league team

Auckland won comfortably and would have won by more but only 3 of their 12 tries were converted. There was a good deal of interest in the appearance of Jack Hemi, the great player who had represented New Zealand in 10 matches, New Zealand Māori (2), Auckland (2), Auckland Māori (12), and Manukau (108). His younger brother Lou (aged 17) played at full back for Wellington. They both lived in the Wairarapa but traveled to Wellington in the weekends to play for Randwick. Tragically it turned out that Lou had been unwell prior to the game and required treatment at halftime. He was later taken to Wairarapa Hospital and did not recover, dying aged just 18 on September 9. His last acts on the sporting field were to kick two penalty goals for Wellington. There was surprise before the match when it was found out that Pita Ririnui had been dropped from the Auckland side after failing to attend training. He was replaced in the starting side by Abbie Graham. Les Clement and A Rogers had been unavailable due to injury. The Wellington side fielded Harvey Kreyl at lock, he would go on to represent New Zealand 7 years later in 1952.

21 July	Auckland	46-7	Wellington	Carlaw Park 1
3:00	Try: Brian Nordgren 3, Allan Wiles, Bernard Lowther 3, Royce Speedy 2, Don McLeod, Des Ryan, Travers Hardwick; Con: Brian Nordgren 2, Warwick Clarke; Pen: Brian Nordgren 2		Try: M Holland; Pen: Lou Hemi 2	Attendance: 12,000; Referee: J O'Shannessey

==== Auckland v West Coast (South Island) ====
The West Coast team was the first to play in Auckland since 1933. Auckland won a very hard-fought match in front of a large crowd of 13,000. During the second half Brian Nordgren and Jack Forrest were injured in a tackle. Despite protests St Johns said that neither player could carry on after both received head cuts. This meant both sides had to play on with 12 players. For Auckland Travers Hardwick moved from the forwards to play in the wing, while Ken Mountford did the same for the West Coast. After the match Nordgren and Forrest both went to Auckland Hospital to be treated. Earlier in the match Bernard Lowther was injured and was replaced by Roy Nurse at halftime. During the following week the "local" (Auckland) replacement rule was clarified as typically players could not be replaced at halftime unless they were in the hands of St Johns or a doctor at the conclusion of the first half, which in this case Lowther was. This differed from the English rules where replacements at halftime were not allowed. The referee also needed to be notified that a replacement was happening which he was. However the opposing captain, Ces Mountford was not told as "everything was done in a rush". It was also stated during the week that the gate receipts of £435 were a record since the outbreak of the war in 1939, and were a record for such a fixture.

4 August	Auckland	8-7	West Coast	Carlaw Park 1
3:00	Try: Brian Nordgren, Roy Nurse; Pen: Warwick Clarke		Try: Bill Mountford; Pen: J McNaughton, Ces Mountford	Attendance: 13,000; Referee: G Kelly

==== Wellington v Auckland ====
Brian Nordgren had scored 9 tries in 3 games for Auckland already in the season and followed up with a remarkable 5 more in Auckland's easy win over Wellington. With the 7 conversions he kicked his personal tally was an extraordinary 29 points. His last try came in the second half when he "pounded past the Wellington defence for 75 yards for an unconverted try which brought the crowd to its feet". Allan Wiles and Roy Nurse were originally chosen amongst the traveling reserves for Auckland but were unavailable and their places were taken by Jack Zane-Zaninovich (Mt Albert), and Gordon Prenter (Richmond). The match saw 2,239 tickets sold at the gate with gross takings of £143 with the Auckland share being £49. It was pointed out by Auckland treasurer that when the Wellington team played in Auckland the share for Wellington was £354.

8 September	Wellington	17-47	Auckland	Basin Reserve, Wellington
3:00	Try: Walter McKeich, J Parata, William Elworthy 2, Charles Upston; Con: Frank Moses		Try: Brian Nordgren 5, Pat Kelly 2, Joe Murray, Les Clement 2, Don McLeod; Con: Brian Nordgren 7	Attendance: 2,500; Referee: L. Davies

==== South Auckland (Waikato) v Auckland ====
Brian Nordgren was once again in scoring form, crossing for 3 tries and kicking 3 conversions and a penalty in Auckland's 26–13 win. In a surprise selection Jack Smith was selected in the reserves for Auckland over Warwick Clarke at fullback. He had only recently returned from the war and had only played 2 games. Allan Wiles collided with another player in the second half and went off to get stitches. Reserve Rex Cunningham played at five eighth and scored a try for Auckland. As replacements were not allowed during the second half it is possible that he started the match in the halves ahead of H Grady as the New Zealand Herald stated that Auckland played a man short for most of the second half.

29 September	South Auckland (Waikato)	13-26	Auckland	Davies Park, Huntly
3:00	Try: Mair, Albert Hambleton, F Hilton; Con: Stevens 2		Try: Brian Nordgren 3, Pat Kelly 2, Rex Cunningham; Con: Brian Nordgren 3 Pen: Brian Nordgren	Referee: S Farrer

==== North Island v South Island (inter-island match) ====
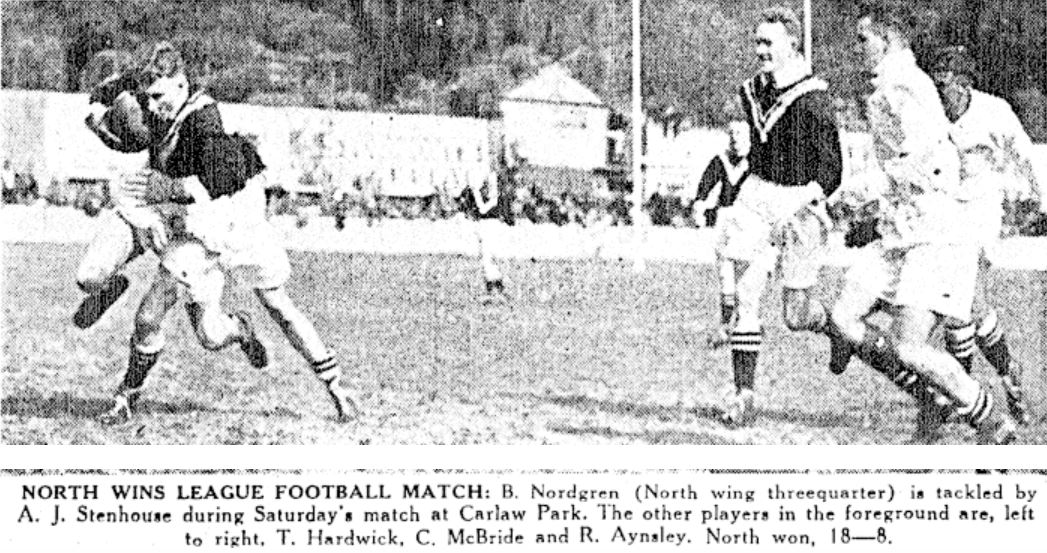

The South Island team featured 2 Wellington players (F Moses and Hector Mallinder) for the first time in its history, rendering it a South Island team in name only. G Moyes, chosen at lock from Waikato was unavailable as he was feeling unwell so his place was taken by Fred James of the City side and he played well scoring 2 tries. Veteran Arthur Kay played for the North Island in the centre position. He was in his 13th season of senior rugby league having debuted for Ponsonby in 1933. The crowd was estimated at between 15 and 20,000 which was the largest seen at the ground for many years.

6 October	North Island	18-8 (8-6)	South Island	Carlaw Park 1
3:00	Try: Brian Nordgren, Travers Hardwick, Fred James 2 Con: Jack Smith 2 Pen: Jack Smith		Try: Bill Mountford, Hector Mallinder; Con: Ces Mountford	Attendance: 15-20,000; Referee: K Knapper

=== Games played and scoring ===
==== Auckland ====
No	Name	Club Team	Play	Tries	Con	Pen	Points
1	Brian Nordgren	Ponsonby	5	17	16	4	91
2	Bernard Lowther	Richmond	4	3	3	0	15
3	Royce Speedy	Ōtāhuhu	2	4	0	0	12
3	Pat Kelly	Ponsonby	2	4	0	0	12
5	Don McLeod	Marist	4	2	0	0	6
5	Joe Murray	Manukau	4	2	0	0	6
5	Les Clement	Mount Albert	3	2	0	0	6
8	Warwick Clarke	City	4	1	0	1	5
9	Allan Wiles	Mt Albert	3	1	0	0	3
9	Roy Nurse	Ponsonby	2	1	0	0	3
11	Travers Hardwick	Ponsonby	5	0	0	0	0
11	Jock Rutherford	North Shore	4	0	0	0	0
11	Des Ryan	Richmond	3	0	0	0	0
11	A Thompson	Richmond	3	0	0	0	0
11	Roy Clark	North Shore	2	0	0	0	0
11	Jack Major	Manukau	2	0	0	0	0
11	Pita Ririnui	Manukau	2	0	0	0	0
11	Hubert (Bob) Borich	Mt Albert	1	0	0	0	0
11	Tom Butler	Manukau	1	0	0	0	0
11	Rex Cunningham	City	1	0	0	0	0
11	H Grady	Ōtāhuhu	1	0	0	0	0
11	Abbie Graham	North Shore	2	0	0	0	0
11	Frank Hilton	Richmond	1	0	0	0	0
11	Fred James	City	1	0	0	0	0
11	Ron McGregor	Richmond	1	0	0	0	0
11	George Mitchell	City	1	0	0	0	0
11	A Rogers	Manukau	1	0	0	0	0
11	Richard Shadbolt	Mt Albert	1	0	0	0	0
11	S Thomassen	Mt Albert	1	0	0	0	0

==== Auckland Māori ====
There were patchy newspaper reports of the team named to play Huntly District and not all players were mentioned in reports so the list is incomplete.

No	Name	Club Team	Play	Tries	Con	Pen	Points
1	James Silva	City	1	0	2	3	10
1	D.W. Padlie	Mt Albert	2	2	0	0	6
1	Tom Butler	Manukau	1	0	2	0	4
4	Joe Murray	Manukau	2	1	0	0	3
5	Kirkwood	Manukau	1	1	0	0	3
5	Pita Ririnui	Manukau	2	1	0	0	3
5	George Mitchell	Richmond	1	1	0	0	3
5	Frank Hilton	Richmond	2	0	0	0	0
5	Pouvi (Robert) Salaia	Manukau	1	0	0	0	0
5	Jack Major	Manukau	1	0	0	0	0
11	Rangi Katipa	Marist	1	0	0	0	0
11	W Rogers	Manukau	1	0	0	0	0
11	George Shilton	Manukau	1	0	0	0	0
11	W Te Tai	Manukau	1	0	0	0	0
11	Aubrey Thompson	Richmond	1	0	0	0	0
11	W Briggs	Ponsonby	1	0	0	0	0
11	D Muru	Newton	1	0	0	0	0

==== Auckland Pākehā ====
No	Name	Club Team	Play	Tries	Con	Pen	Points
1	Brian Nordgren	Ponsonby	1	1	3	2	13
2	Allen Wiles	Mt Albert	1	1	0	0	3
2	Don McLeod	Marist	1	1	0	0	3
4	Warwick Clarke	City	1	0	0	0	0
4	Roy Nurse	Ponsonby	1	0	0	0	0
4	Royce Speedy	Ōtāhuhu	1	0	0	0	0
4	Roy Clark	North Shore	1	0	0	0	0
4	Les Clement	Mt Albert	1	0	0	0	0
4	D? Graham	North Shore	1	0	0	0	0
4	John Rutherford	North Shore	1	0	0	0	0
4	Travers Hardwick	Ponsonby	1	0	0	0	0
4	Joffre Johnson	Ōtāhuhu	1	0	0	0	0
4	Des Ryan	Richmond	1	0	0	0	0

==== North Island ====
Of the thirteen players selected for the North Island, 11 of them were from Auckland.

No	Name	Club Team	Play	Tries	Con	Pen	Points
1	Jack Smith	North Shore	1	0	2	1	6
1	Fred James	City	1	2	0	0	6
3	Brian Nordgren	Ponsonby	1	1	0	0	3
3	Travers Hardwick	Ponsonby	1	1	0	0	3
5	Arthur Kay	Ponsonby	1	0	0	0	0
5	Joe Murray	Manukau	1	0	0	0	0
5	Pat Kelly	Ponsonby	1	0	0	0	0
5	Roy Clark	North Shore	1	0	0	0	0
5	L Allen	South Auckland	1	0	0	0	0
5	Albert Hambleton	South Auckland	1	0	0	0	0
5	John Rutherford	North Shore	1	0	0	0	0
5	Des Ryan	Richmond	1	0	0	0	0
5	Pita Ririnui	Manukau	1	0	0	0	0

== Annual General Meetings and Club News ==
=== Auckland Junior Management Committee ===
The Junior Control Board held their first meeting at the ARL League Rooms on Tuesday, March 15 at 8pm. Their honorary secretary was W. F. Clarke. Their annual meeting was held on Tuesday, April 10 at 8pm in the League Rooms, Chamber of Commerce Building, Courthouse Lane. Their assistant secretary was Ivan Stonex. At their annual meeting the following members were elected:- Messrs. G. Bathchelor, W. Dormer, A. Strong, S.M. McClure, W. W. Berger, C. Howe, E. Renner, L. Healy, and Ivan Stonex. Stonex had been elected chairman and would also represent them on the board of control.

=== Auckland Schoolboy Control Board ===
Maurice Wetherill was appointed chairman of the School Control Board. Permission was given to the School Boy Control Board for an intermediate team to travel to Christchurch and the West Coast in August. On October 27 Auckland Rugby League held their Schoolboy Gala. Prizes were presented by chairman Watson, and went to: Goal Kicking; Senior – Keenan (Green Lane), Intermediate – Carter (Newton), Junior – Herewini (Point Chevalier), 50 Yards; (seven-a-side midgets) - Marsden 1, Nesbitt 2; 75 Yards (seven-a-side) Osborne (Richmond) 1, Moore (Richmond) 2, 75 yards (junior): Gavin (Green Lane) 1, Gissing (Ellerslie) 2, 100 yards (intermediate): Christian (Otahuhu) 1, Hayson (Newton) 2. 100 yards (senior): Menzies (Ellerslie) 1, Keenan (Green Lane) 2. Tug-of-war (seven-a-side_: City 1, Junior representative football: East 3 West 0, Relay Race (senior): Point Chevalier 1, Marist 2. Relay race (intermediate) Otahuhu 1, Pt Chevalier 2. Relay Race (junior) Otahuhu 1, Green Lane 2. Senior football: Representatives 5 Rest 2. Grand March for Court Cup: Mt Albert 1.

=== Auckland Referees Association ===
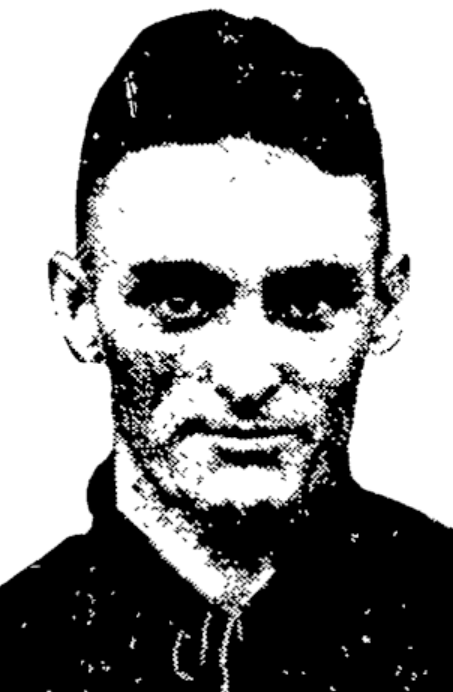
Former international Ted Mincham was the referee delegate to the junior control board.

The Referees Association held their annual general meeting on March 7, at the Auckland Rugby League board rooms at 8pm. Their honorary secretary was Thomas E. Skinner. On April 4 they advised that the following officials had been elected – President, Mr. Les E. Bull; vice president, Mr. J.G. McGowatt; secretary, Mr. T.E. Skinner; treasurer, Mr. Roy Otto; delegate to Auckland Rugby League, Mr. Ted Mincham; delegate to Junior Control Board, Mr. J. Short; delegate to School Control Board, Mr. J. Cottingham; delegate to New Zealand Referees' Association, Mr. Les E. Bull; auditor, Mr. Percy Rogers; critic Mr. A. Saunders; executive committee, Messrs M. Renton; examination committee, Messrs. Stuart Billman, Roy Otto, Ted Mincham, J. Cottingham, Jack Hawkes.

=== Avondale League Football Club ===
Avondale League Football Club held their annual meeting on Thursday, March 22 in the club's rooms at Avondale Town Hall at 8pm. Their honorary secretary was W.W. Green.

=== City Rovers Rugby League Football Club ===
City Rovers Rugby League Football Club held their annual meeting in the Auckland Rugby League Rooms at 7.30pm on Monday, March 5. Their honorary secretary was Ted Girven. The advertised for 3rd grade players to attend a practice at Victoria Park Grandstand on Saturday, March 17 at 2pm. It was reported in March that Hawea Mataira would be unavailable for City this season as he was "in camp and will probably be going overseas shortly with an Expeditionary Force draft". On April 4 the City club applied for life membership of Ernie Asher who had "been prominent in the code for many years". A decision on the application was held over to the following weekend. City advertised for a practice game against another senior side for Carlaw Park on Saturday, April 7 at 2pm.

=== Ellerslie United Rugby League Club ===
Ellerslie United Rugby League Club held their annual meeting at the Parish Hall in Ellerslie on March 15 at 7.30pm. Their honorary secretary was G. Whaley. Ellerslie advertised training at Ellerslie Reserve on Saturday, April 7 at 2pm and noted that they had vacancies in all grades.

=== Glenora Rugby League Football Club ===
Glenora Rugby League Football Club held their annual meeting at Glen Eden Town Hall Library on Tuesday, March 13 at 8pm. Their honorary secretary was Alec Dracevich. On June 20 the Glenora club requested that a senior match be played at Glen Eden with a decision by the board being deferred. It was decided to play the City match against Pt Chevalier at the Glen Eden Recreation Ground on August 18.

=== Green Lane Rugby League Football Club ===
Green Lane Rugby League Football Club held their annual meeting on Wednesday, March 28 at 8pm in the Green Lane Fire Station Hall in Green Lane. Their secretary was D. Paviour-Smith.

=== Marist Brothers Old Boys League Football Club ===
Marist Brothers Old Boys League Football Club had their annual meetin on March 6 at the Auckland Rugby League Rooms at 7.45pm. Their honorary secretary was Jack Kirwan. In mid May Marist was granted the use of Carlaw Park on Monday, June 4 for a Town v Country benefit match for Jimmy Chalmers, a member of their club who had returned from war service severely injured. He had a leg amputated at the hip as a result of his injuries. The Town team would be represented by Marist and City, while the Country team would be made up from the Manukau and Ōtāhuhu sides with Jack Kirwan writing to confirm arrangements on May 30. In July Marist were given permission to invite a Wellington team to visit Auckland to play the Marist seventh grade team on July 21.

=== Manukau Rugby League Football Club ===
Manukau Rugby League Football Club held their annual meeting was held in the Band Room, Queen Street, Onehunga, on Tuesday, February 27 at 8pm. Their honorary secretary was H. de Wolfe. On March 17 members of the Manukau club published an In Memoriam notice in the newspapers to remember W.H. Inglis who had been killed in the war on that day in 1944. Manukau advertised a practice for all grades, asking they attend Galway St, Onehunga at 2pm on March 17. Manukau advertised a training for all players at Carlaw Park on Friday, March 30 at 10am. Ralph Martin applied for a transfer from Manukau to Otahuhu but the Manukau club refused. At the following meeting it was decided to refuse the transfer on the ground that he was registered with the Manukau club and would need to stand down for a year. It was intimated that he would therefore switch codes to play rugby union.

=== Mount Albert League Football Club ===
Mount Albert League Football Club scheduled their annual picnic for Tui Glen in Henderson on January 21 but due to "unfavourable weather conditions" postponed it until February 4. Their annual meeting was held on Thursday, March 1 at their headquarters at Fowlds Park in Morningside. Their honorary secretary was F.W. Clement. Mt. Albert advertised a training at Carlaw Park for March 3, with Juniors at 2pm and Seniors at 3pm. Their honorary secretary following their annual meeting was Theo Gabriel. They held another preseason practice at Carlaw Park on March 10 for all grades. They advertised a special meeting of players and coaches at Fowlds Park Pavilion on Monday 28 at 8.15pm. On September 19 the club held their annual dance at the Peter Pan Cabaret. They also held an Art Union competition with winners announced in the New Zealand Herald on October 17. They held their prize giving at the Masonic Hall on Tuesday, October 30.

=== Newton Rangers Rugby League Club ===
Newton Rangers Rugby League Club held their 35th annual meeting was held at the ARL League Rooms on Courthouse Lane on Monday, March 12 at 8pm. Their acting secretary was W. Preston. They advertised for all players intending to play to attend a training at 2pm on Saturday, March 17 at 2pm. Their honorary secretary was W.G. Simms. Following their "enthusiastic" annual meeting it was reported that the club was undergoing a "reorganisation". It was said that "this old established club promises this season to play a prominent part in league activities, and good support is assured from the 50 members who attended the meeting. The following officers were elected:- Committee, J. Rowntree (chairman), F. Hayson, K. Childs, J. R. Green, G. Woolley, J. Davison, W. Condon, E. Cowley, S. Davison; treasurer Mr. W. Preston; secretary, Mr. W. G. Simms". They advertised for another practice day for all grades on Friday, March 30 at 10am. On April 7 the Newton club advertised for a meeting of all its sixth grade players at Carlaw Park, Monday 7pm and that coaches were required for these teams. On April 11 Newton held a "great club rally" in Te Akarana Band Hall, Newton for Wednesday, 8pm to discuss the seasons prospects and suggestions to make Newton a greater club. They held another club rally on April 18 at the City Boy's Band Hall (opposite Druids' Hall, Newton).

=== North Shore Albions League Football Club ===
North Shore Albions League Football Club held their annual meeting was originally scheduled at their Football Shed at Vauxhall Road on Tuesday, March 6 at 7.30pm. Their honorary secretary was M. W. Coghlan. However it ultimately did not take place until Monday, March 16 at 8pm. North Shore held a training at their football shed on Thursday prior to the opening round.

=== Ōtāhuhu Rugby League Football Club ===
Otahuhu Rugby League Football Club had their annual general meeting at their club rooms on Hutton Street in Otahuhu on Monday, March 26 at 7.45pm. They also scheduled a club practice to be held on Saturday, March 3 at 2.30pm on the Fairburn Road Grounds. Their honorary secretary was M. Ritchie.

=== Papakura Rugby League Football Club ===
Papakura Rugby League Football Club advertised their first training of the year for Tuesday, February 13 at 8pm at their club headquarters at Union Street in Papakura. Their honorary secretary was A.L. Lewis. Their 14th annual general meeting was held on Monday, March 5 at 8pm at their clubrooms on Union Street, Papakura. They requested nominations for president and nine committee members to be submitted by February 26.

=== Point Chevalier Rugby League Football Club ===
Point Chevalier Rugby League Football Club held their annual meeting in their Social Club's Hall at 417 Point Chevalier Road on Monday, March 5 at 8pm. Their honorary secretary was A.G. Daniels. They held a meeting for all senior players at Carlaw Park on April 7 at 8.30pm. A training was held for the Senior B players on Wednesday, April 25 at Walker Park. On May 1 the Point Chevalier club advertised vacancies for their fifth and seventh grade players and were asked to apply to their honorary secretary, A.G. Daniels at 16, Formby Avenue in Point Chevalier.

=== Ponsonby United Rugby League Club ===
Ponsonby United Rugby League Club held their 35th annual meeting on Monday, February 26 at 7.30pm at Leys Institute. Their honorary secretary was J. Davidson. In March it was reported that Gordon Littlejohn, the former Auckland rugby union representative who had switched codes to Ponsonby in 1944 had applied for reinstatement back to rugby union. On May 28 the family of Noel Martin reported that he had arrived safely in England after having been held a prisoner of war at Stalag XVIII A for four years.

=== Richmond Rovers Football Club ===
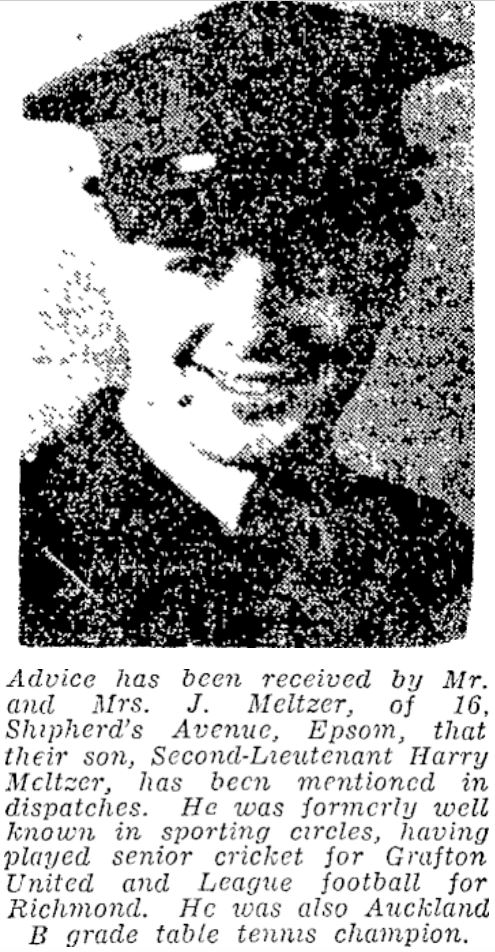

Richmond Rovers Football Club held their annual meeting at the clubrooms at Grey Lynn Park on Monday, March 19 at 7.45. Their honorary secretary was W.R. Dick. Richmond advertised for preseason practice matches on Saturday, April 7. The third grade side was to play Manukau at 1.45pm and the senior team to play the same opponent at 2.45pm. They matches were at the clubs headquarters at Grey Lynn Park. In April Mr. William Leithfield Moore died aged 46. He had moved to Auckland in 1922 and played for the Richmond club and had continued to following them since. It was reported in July that Corporal Harry Meltzer had won a commission while at war. He had previously played for the Richmond seniors in 1941 and was also a well-known cricketer. He was Second-Lieutenant Meltzer who is serving with the 2nd N.Z.E.F., held a commission in the home defences but had resigned it in 1943 to go overseas. On Wednesday, September 26 they held their end of season dance at the Masonic Hall on Upper Queen Street with Epi Shalfoon's Orchestra performing.

=== Transfers and registrations ===
On April 4 the following players were registered:- (Mt Albert): Allan Wiles, S. Rosewarne, C.I. Caples, A.L. Caples, A.J. Couper, Ronald Allen Neary, R.P. Smyth, J.T. Loza, D.W. Padle, (Manukau): T. Hira, B. Morris, S. Leefe, P. Habib, W. Webster, P. Sullivan, T. Timoko, P. Warren, D. Collier, R.E. Kirk, (Richmond): H.T. Strickland, Des Ryan, W. Graham.

On April 11 the following players were registered:- (Richmond): R.M. Robertson, G. Gordon, (Manukau): W. Broughton, K.K. Rudolph, J.K. Rudolph, (Marist): Peter Suafala Sofaea, B.H. Curran, L.B.J. McCallion, (Point Chevalier): G. Gordon, T. Bradford, B. Edwards, Alfred Basil Dormer, E.J. Warner, Taurere Taurere, G. Downie, R.H. Green, J.A. Campbell, (Newton): F. Webb, G.W. Scott, H. Shepherd, C. Douglas, G.T. Beazley, A.R. Murray, (Mount Albert): Arthur Desmond (Des) Pike, Sydney Arthur Rutter, B.P. Houpapa, (North Shore): L. Klincie, (Ponsonby): I.M. Brigden, A.J. Skinner, W.K. Greer. The following transfers were approved:- John Anderson from Point Chevalier to Marist; J. McWilliams from Richmond to Marist; R.M. Robertson from City to Richmond; Edward Michael Sexton from Marist to City.

On April 18 the following were registered:- (Richmond): J.W. Sinclair, C.A. Cann, (Ponsonby): E.W. Allen, (Otahuhu): C. Pearson, D. Hardy, (Point Chevalier): P Warren, L.A.C. Kelly, (North Shore): R.S. Sycamore, (Mt Albert): W. Rhodes, (City): A Kerr, F. Simpson, R. Flinkenberg, (Newton): I.C. McKay. The following transfers were approved:- J.A. Wilson from Richmond to Huntly, E. Opai and T. Pai from Manukau to Frankton, Wilfred Brimble from Newton to Ponsonby, Owen Hughes from Otahuhu to Ponsonby, D. Hardie from Manukau to Otahuhu, P. Morris from Manukau to Otahuhu, L.R. Davis from Richmond to Mount Albert, and E. Lyell from City to Marist. A clearance from Richmond was granted to George Tittleton.

On April 25, E.P. Smith, D.R. Tierney, J. Brown, W. Hunia, and F.R. Calderbank were registered for Newton, while T. Masters, and K. Honiana were registered with Manukau. On May 23 J.A. McDonnell of Ponsonby seniors was regraded to senior B.

On July 11 a Mt Albert player, R.P. Smyth applied for a transfer to Pt Chevalier. He had played the first two games of the season for Mt Albert's senior side however he had been an emergency player for the following 4 weeks and not required to play. He then moved down into the senior B team but wished to play senior football. After some discussion it was decided that he should be allowed a transfer to Pt Chevalier.
