= Municipal Borough of Castleford =

Former local government area in the UK

Coordinates: 53.725°N 1.353°W

Castleford
- Coat of arms of the borough council
- Area
  - 1911: 564 acres (228 ha)
  - 1931: 564 acres (228 ha)
  - 1961: 4,395 acres (1,779 ha)
- Population
  - 1911: 23,090
  - 1931: 21,784
  - 1961: 40,350
- History
  - Created: 1894
  - Abolished: 1974
  - Succeeded by: Metropolitan Borough of Wakefield
- Status: Local board (1851–1894); Urban district (1894–1955); Municipal borough (1955– 1974)
- Government
  - Motto: Audacter et Sincere; Boldly and frankly
- Map of boundary as of 1971

The Municipal Borough of Castleford was a local government district in the West Riding of Yorkshire from 1955 to 1974 based in the town of Castleford, and also covering Airedale, New Fryston, Whitwood, Cutsyke, Glasshoughton and Whitwood. The Castleford Urban District Council administered the town from 1894 to 1955.

== History ==
Castleford's Local Board of Health was established to run the local affairs of the town in 1851. At this time they met at the offices of George Bradley, which later became the Liberal Club. At a meeting of the board on 28 July 1869, it was resolved that a design for a new coat of arms be adopted and that the Latin phrase Audacter et Sincere (Boldly and Frankly) be adopted as Castleford's motto. The coat of arms is canting and features a gold castle and a ford of white and blue waves upon the shield. White roses indicate the West Riding of Yorkshire, a gold Roman eagle represents the fact that the town stands on the site of a Roman station and a miner's safety lamp alludes to the local coal mining industry. On each wing of the eagle is the badge of the Laceys, Earls of Lincoln and Lords of the Honour in which Castleford used to lie.

In 1871, the Board purchased Gilcroft Cottage to use as offices, originally a private residence. The site also contained the fire station and plumbers workshops. When built in the 1850s, it stood in orchards and allotments. It was bounded by Carlton Street to its front and Gill's Croft (now Bradley Street), from which it got its name. Castleford Free Library was added at the side in 1905. The Local Board became an urban district in 1894 as a result of the Local Government Act 1894, which had boundaries drawn tightly around the town centre.

The Urban District Council petitioned unsuccessfully for borough status for several decades. In 1937 Castleford UD expanded by absorbing 20 acres (8.1 ha) of the abolished Methley Urban District (the remaining 3,473 acres (1,405 ha) went to enlarge Rothwell Urban District), and in 1938 a major boundary extension occurred as Castleford annexed Whitwood Urban District 1,060 acres (430 ha) as well as part of Tadcaster Rural District (76 acres (31 ha) at Allerton Bywater) and part of the abolished Pontefract Rural District (2,674 acres (1,082 ha) comprising Glass Houghton and part of Ferry Fryston civil parishes.

The expansion created the 'largest UDC in Yorkshire'. Castleford's Charter of Incorporation as a borough was granted on 29 March 1955 and the new borough council superseded the old UDC at 12 noon on Monday 23 May 1955. After 1955 it was the third largest non-county borough in Yorkshire.

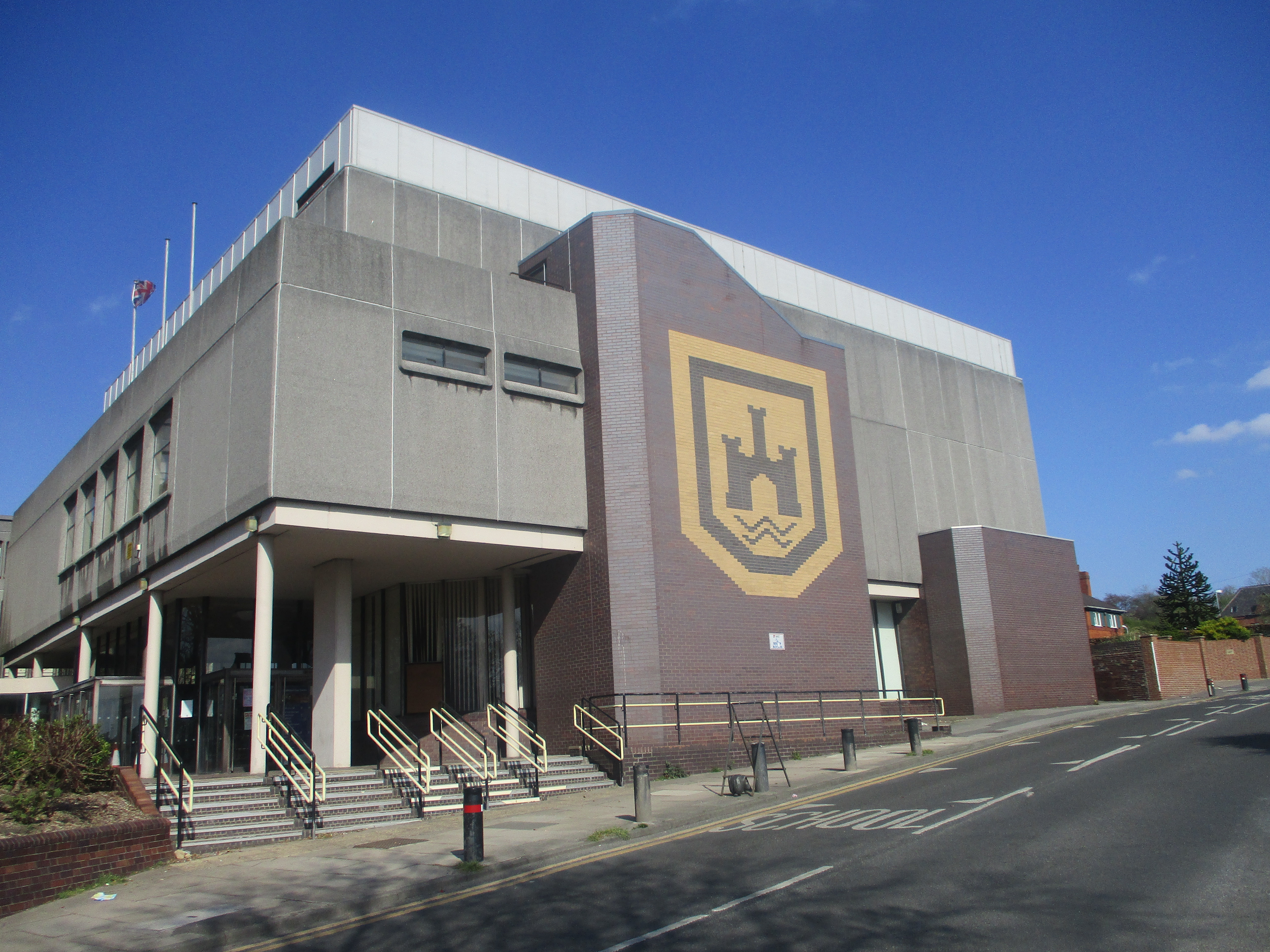
Castleford Civic Centre, Ferrybridge Road

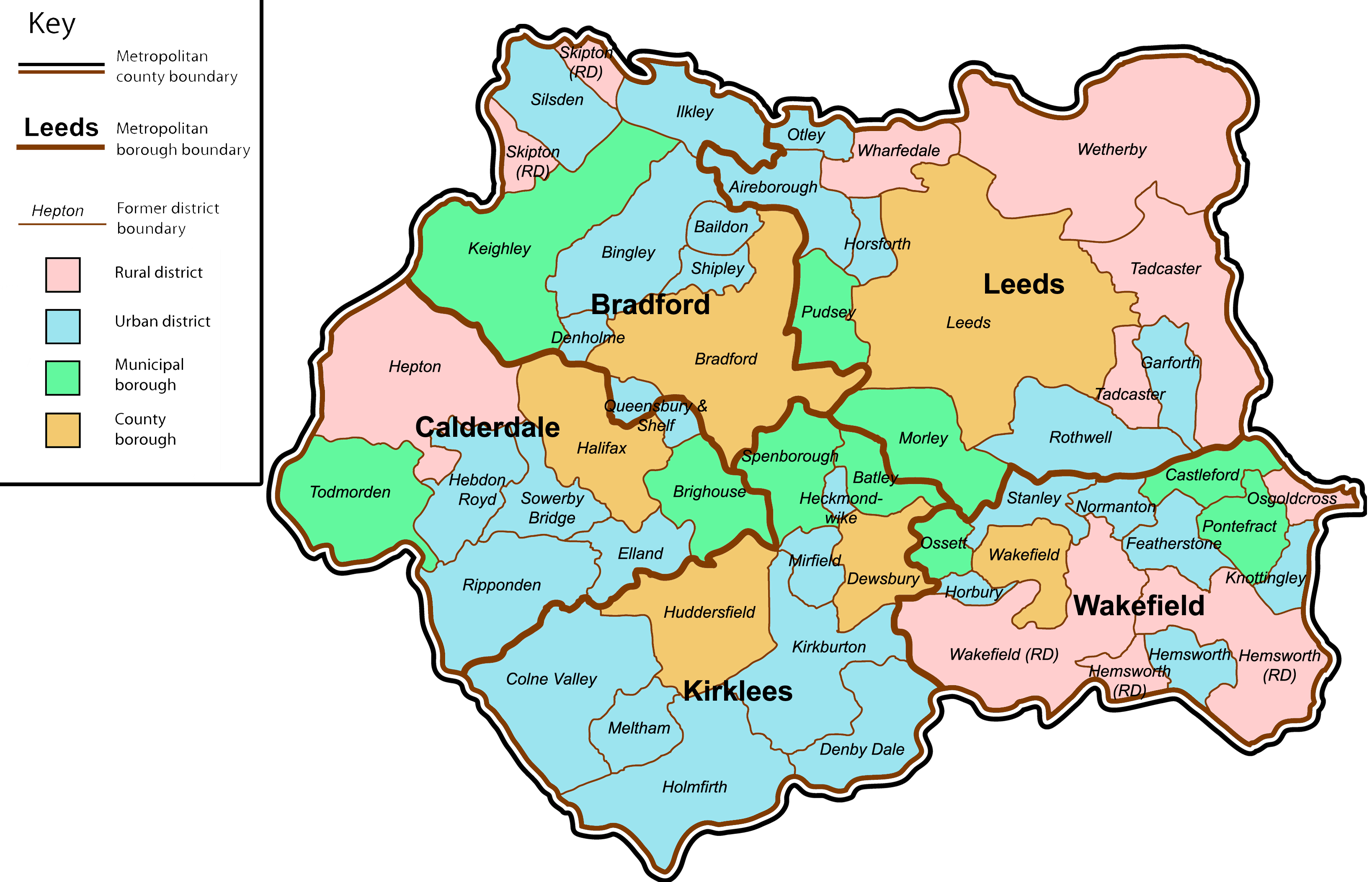
The surrounding pre-1974 districts which now make up West Yorkshire

The Borough Council built Castleford Civic Centre in 1970 as a purpose-built auditorium featuring two large function rooms as well as being an administration base for the Council, with an official opening by the Duchess of Kent on 14 March 1970.

The borough was abolished under the Local Government Act 1972, and created the north-eastern portion of the new Metropolitan Borough of Wakefield in West Yorkshire by a merger with the County Borough of Wakefield, the Ossett and Pontefract municipal boroughs, Horbury, Stanley, Normanton, Featherstone, Knottingley, and Hemsworth urban districts, and Wakefield, Hemsworth and Osgoldcross rural districts.
