= Arthur Tillotson =

British footballer

Arthur William Tillotson (15 September 1926 – 11 April 2016) was a British football player from Skipton who played for the Silsden FC team during the 1940s and 50s, in attack, centre-forward, centre-half, defense, and left-back positions.

In the 1930s, he also played in Leeds United FC first ever game when he was 17 years old on 28 August 1920 at Port Vale FC in the position of left-back. His nine goals in one game for Silsden remains unchallenged. In 1951 he scored the winning goal for his team against Bradford City AFC. Even when he retired from the team, Tillotson continued to support the club for the rest of his life and was elected life president. After he died, the Arthur Tillotson Memorial Cup was created in his honor. He also played for Castleford Town FC.
