= John Illingworth =

John Illingworth may refer to:

- John Illingworth (footballer) (1904–1964), English footballer
- John Illingworth (yacht designer) (1903–1980), English naval engineer
- J. R. Illingworth (John Richardson Illingworth, 1848–1915), British Anglican priest, philosopher, and academic
- Juan Illingworth (John Illingworth, 1786–1853), English admiral
