= Colin Roberts =

Colin Roberts may refer to:

- Colin Roberts (footballer) (born 1933), English footballer who played as a wing half
- Colin Roberts (diplomat) (born 1959), British diplomat and Governor of the Falkland Islands
- Colin Henderson Roberts (1909–1990), classical scholar and publisher

== See also ==
- Colin Robertson (disambiguation)
