= Townsley =

Townsley is a surname. Notable people with the surname include:

- Andrew Townsley (born 1952), first class cricketer who played for Yorkshire County Cricket Club in 1974 and 1975
- Barry Townsley CBE (born 1946), British stockbroker
- Clarence Page Townsley (1855–1926), United States Army officer, superintendent of the United States Military Academy
- Debra Townsley, American academic administrator
- Derek Townsley (born 1973), English professional footballer
- Frances E. Townsley (1850–1909), American Baptist minister
- Joel Townsley Rogers (1896–1984), American writer
- Simon Townsley, British photojournalist
- Tom Townsley (1898–1976), Scottish footballer
