= Kryan =

Kryan or Cryan may refer to:

- Kryan Johnson (born 1994), rugby league player
- Cryan, a surname

== See also ==
- The Cryan' Shames, an American band
- Cryon, New South Wales, a parish and hamlet in Australia
- Crion, a commune in France
