= Walter Lynch (footballer) =

English footballer

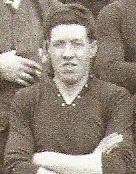
- Lynch pictured in 1922

Personal information
- Date of birth: November 18, 1890
- Place of birth: Castleford, England
- Date of death: March 20, 1968 (aged 77)
- Positions: Centre half; wing half

Senior career*
Years	Team	Apps	(Gls)
- York City
?–1920	Castleford Town		
1920–1921	Bradford City	4	(0)
1921	Raimes Viola		
1921–1922	Pontypridd		
1922–1923	York City	33	(1)
- * Club domestic league appearances and goals

Walter Lynch (1890 - 1968) also known as Ginger Lynch, was an English footballer.

== Career ==
Lynch joined the original York City in 1914, which eventually disbanded in 1917. He played for hometown club Castleford Town Town before joining First Division side Bradford City in July 1920. He made four league appearances for the side before joining Raimes Viola in February 1921, as they finished the 1920–21 season in 11th place in the York Football League Division Three A.

He joined Welsh side Pontypridd in June 1921 and after a season with them joined York City for their first season in the Midland League in August 1922. He was a regular in the York defence, making 33 appearances for the side and scoring a goal in his last game, in a 5–3 defeat to Worksop Town.
