= Robert Tomlinson =

Robert Tomlinson may refer to:

- Robert Tomlinson (missionary) (1842–1913), Irish Anglican medical missionary
- Robert George Tomlinson (1869–1949), English brewer and cricketer
- R. Parkinson Tomlinson (1881–1943), British corn merchant and politician
- Bob Tomlinson, English footballer
- Tommy Tomlinson (Robert M. Tomlinson, born 1945), member of the Pennsylvania State Senate
- Robert Tomlinson (Kansas politician)
