= Richard Foulkes =

English footballer

Personal information
- Date of birth: 1902
- Place of birth: Castleford, England
- Position: Right half

Senior career*
Years	Team	Apps	(Gls)
- Frickley Colliery
1923–1925	Bradford City	35	(0)
- Bournemouth
- * Club domestic league appearances and goals

Richard Foulkes (born 1902) was an English professional footballer who played as a right half.

== Career ==
Born in Castleford, Foulkes played for Frickley Colliery, Bradford City and Bournemouth.

For Bradford City he made 35 appearances in the Football League; he also made 3 appearances in the FA Cup.

== Sources ==
- Frost, Terry (1988). Bradford City A Complete Record 1903-1988. Breedon Books Sport. ISBN 0-907969-38-0.
