= Airedale, Castleford =

Suburb of Castleford, West Yorkshire, England

Coordinates: 53.726°N 1.310°W

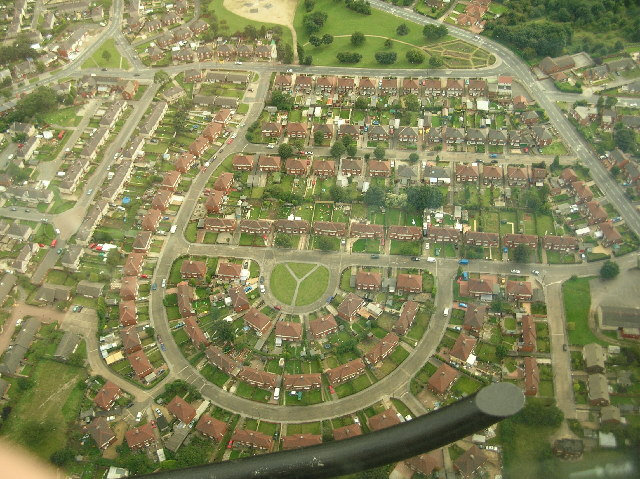
Airedale from the air

Airedale is a suburb in the town of Castleford, West Yorkshire, England. It consists mainly of Local Authority Housing. It borders with Ferry Fryston. The ward of the City of Wakefield called Airedale and Ferry Fryston had a population of 14,811 at the 2011 Census. The River Aire runs near Airedale and is thought to get its name from there.

The area attracted much media attention in November 1984, when a local strikebreaker named Michael Fletcher was savagely beaten by a group of pickets during the UK miners' strike (1984-1985). A masked gang waving baseball bats invaded his house and beat him for five minutes, whilst his pregnant wife and two children hid upstairs. Two miners from Wakefield were later convicted of causing grievous bodily harm in the incident, whereas four others were acquitted of riot and assault.
