= John Illingworth (footballer) =

English footballer

Personal information
- Full name: John William Illingworth
- Date of birth: 3 September 1904
- Place of birth: Castleford, England
- Date of death: 1964 (aged 59–60)
- Position: Right back

Senior career*
Years	Team	Apps	(Gls)
- Castleford Town
- Northfleet United
1929–1934	Tottenham Hotspur	10	(0)
1935	Swansea City	1	(0)
- Barry Town
- * Club domestic league appearances and goals

John William Illingworth (3 September 1904 – 1964) was an English professional footballer who played for Castleford Town, Northfleet United, Tottenham Hotspur, Swansea City and Barry Town.

== Football career ==
Illingworth began his playing career at his local club Castleford Town before joining the Tottenham Hotspur "nursery" club Northfleet United. In 1929 the right back signed for Tottenham Hotspur where he featured in 12 matches in all competitions for the Lilywhites between 1929 and 1934. After leaving White Hart Lane, Illingworth had a spell at Swansea City and finally Barry Town.
