= Castleford Sports Stadium =

Stadium in West Yorkshire, England

- Interactive map of Castleford Sports Stadium
- Location: Lock Lane, Castleford, West Yorkshire
- Coordinates: 53°43′46″N 1°20′55″W

Construction
- Opened: c.1888
- Closed: c.1960

Castleford Sports Stadium was a football, greyhound racing, rugby union and rugby league and multi sports stadium located on the east side of Lock Lane in Castleford, West Yorkshire. It is not to be confused with the Castleford Whitwood Stadium or the Sandy Desert ground used by Castleford Tigers, which was on the west side of Lock Lane.

== Origins ==
The stadium was built on the north bank of the River Aire and on the east side of Lock Lane and was known as the Lock Lane ground in its early days. The ground hosted an early Castleford rugby football team that played Leeds Parish Church RFC in 1888. The team was probably Castleford RFC (1896).

== Athletics and cycling ==
The ground hosted cycling, athletic and charity sports events up until World War I.

== Rugby Union ==
With the formation of the Northern Rugby Football Union (NRFU) in 1895 the ground was used by both the Castleford rugby league team and Castleford rugby union team. The following year in 1896 the Northern Union team moved east to west to a new ground across the opposite side of Lock Lane. In 1928 a newly formed rugby union team played fixtures at the ground.

== Rugby league ==
The ground continued to be used as a rugby league ground by Castleford RFC, up until when they folded in c.1906.

== Football ==
By 1907 Castleford Town F.C. were using the ground to play their football matches. Castleford and Allerton United football club also used the ground at a later date. Castleford Town moved out to play at Wheldon Road but disbanded in 1928 but reformed in 1933 and played at the Lock Lane ground again. After they disbanded for a second time in 1937 redevelopment plans as a greyhound track were proposed.

== Greyhound racing ==
The stadium was duly redeveloped as a greyhound stadium and lasted from c.1939 to c.1950. The racing was independent (not affiliated to the sports governing body the National Greyhound Racing Club) With a capacity of 1,500 it is known to have traded up until 1950 and possibly beyond.

== Closure ==
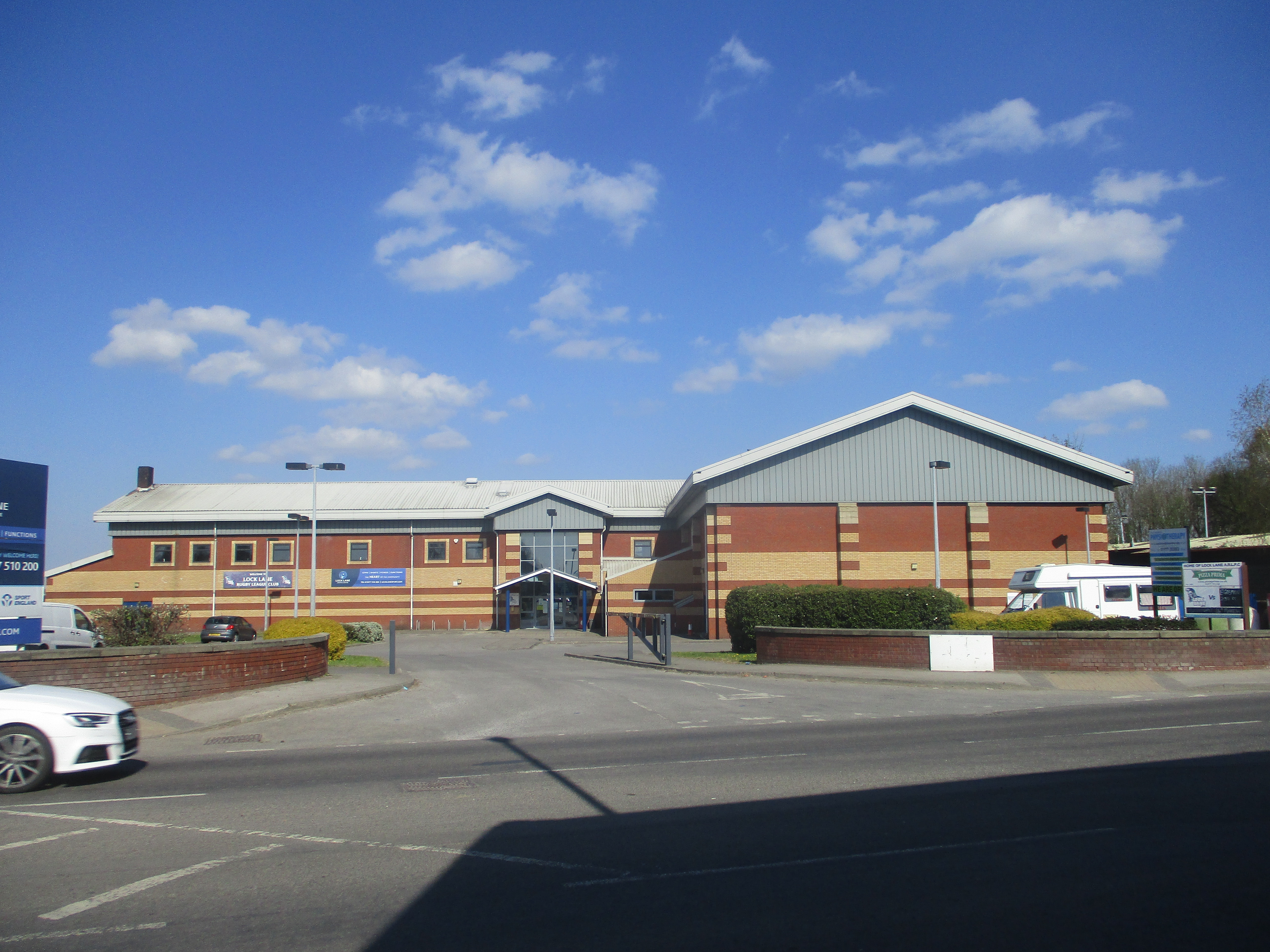
Lock Lane Sports Centre

The stadium was demolished and became a sports ground by 1960. The sports ground was then redeveloped into the Castleford Lock Lane Sports Centre and Hicksons Arena now used by Castleford Lock Lane.
