= Castleford Civic Centre =

Municipal building in Castleford, West Yorkshire, England

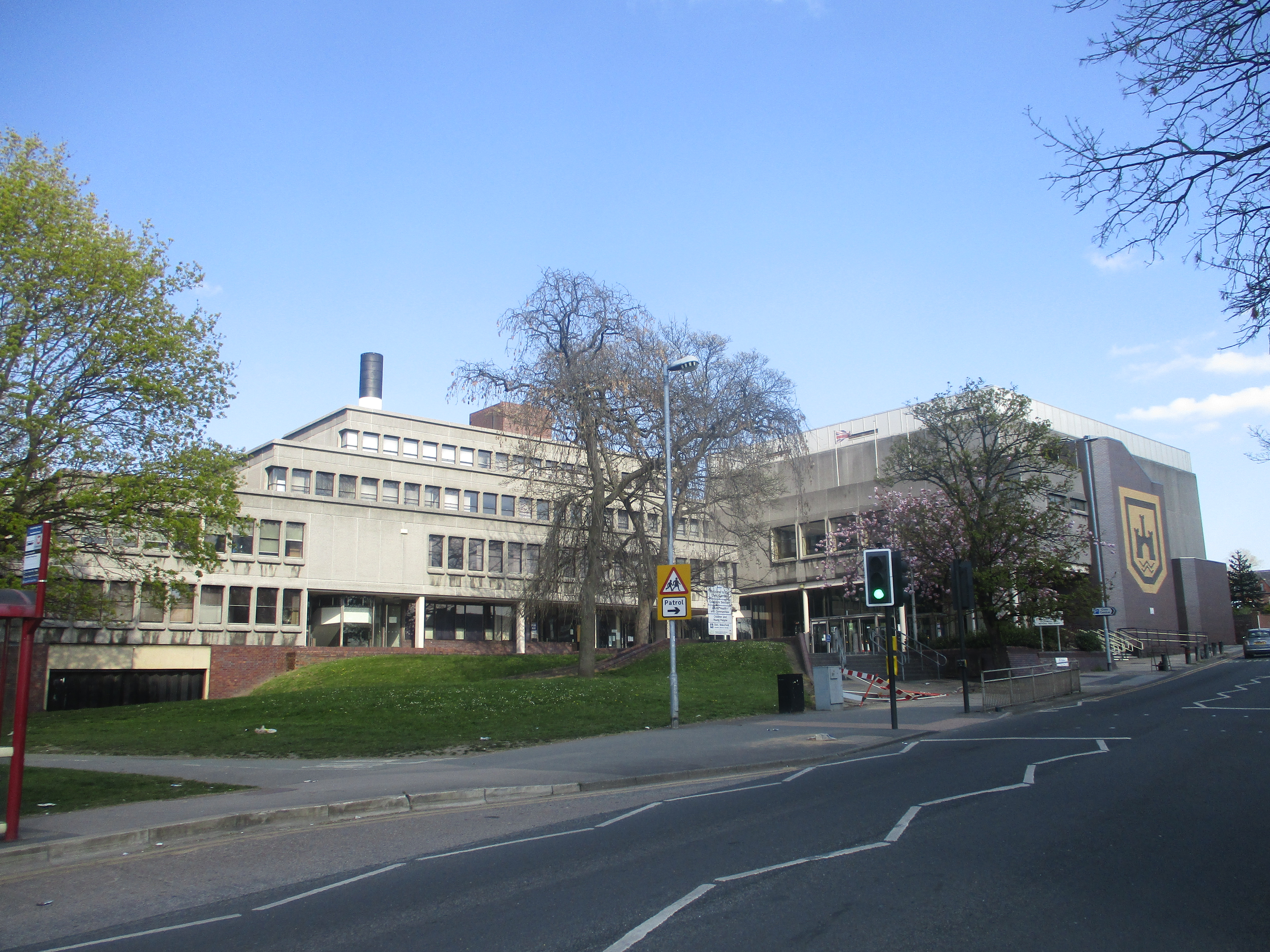
- The building in 2021

- Shown in West Yorkshire
- 53.7247°N 1.3430°W
- Location: Ferrybridge Road, Castleford

History
- Built: 1970

Site notes
- Architect: Griffiths Lewis Goad Partnership
- Architectural style: Brutalist style

Castleford Civic Centre is a municipal building in Ferrybridge Road in Castleford, a town in West Yorkshire in England. The building, which was previously the offices and meeting place of the Municipal Borough of Castleford, is now used as a local events venue.

== History ==
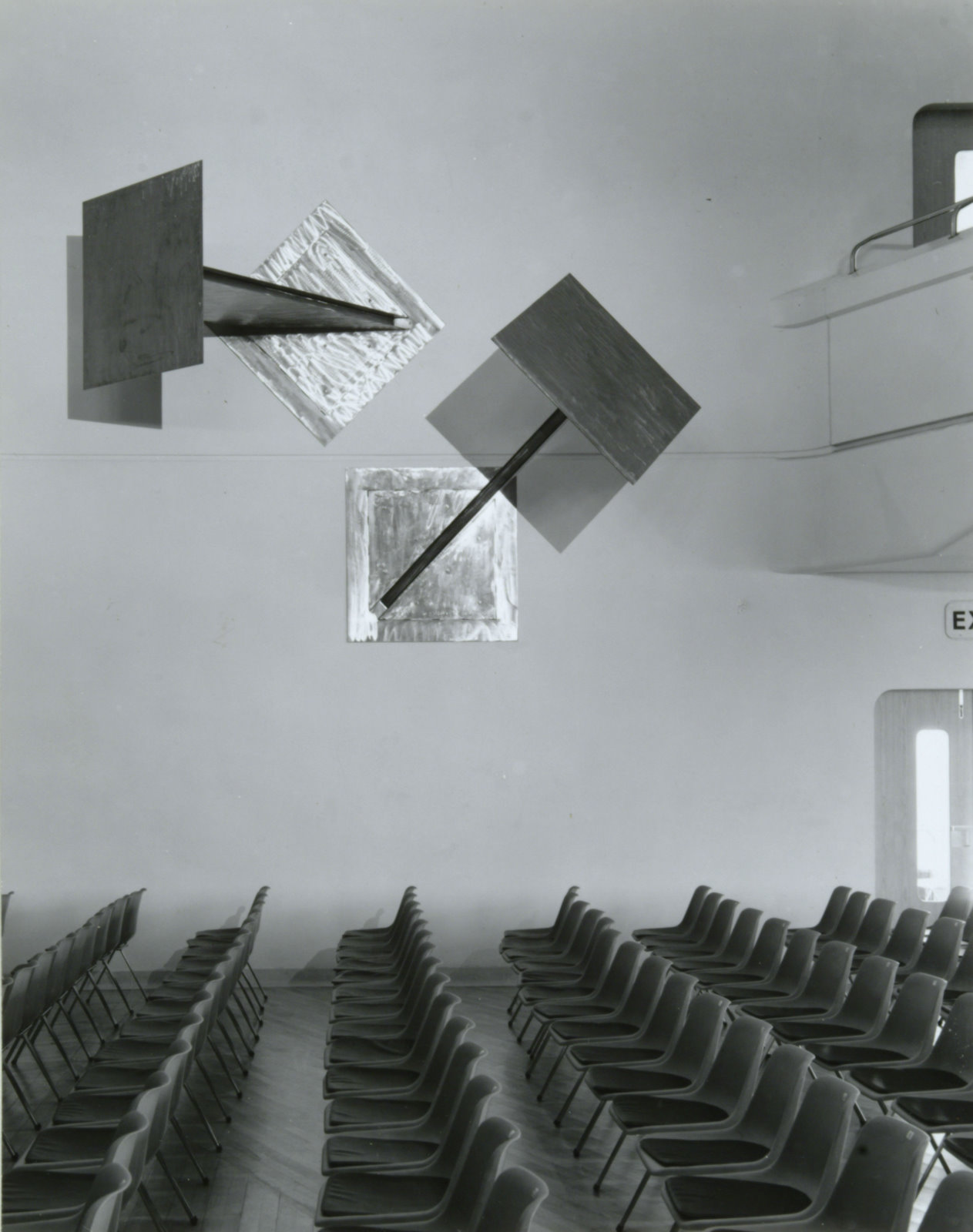
Symmetry in Opposition, sculpture by Diana Dean

After significant industrial growth in the mid-19th century, largely associated with the coal mining and glass industries, a local board of health was formed in 1851. The local board established its offices in a new building, which became known as the Town Hall, in Carleton Street in the 1880. Castleford became an urban district in 1894 and a municipal borough in 1955. However, by the 1960s, the Municipal Borough of Castleford had outgrown the old town hall, and decided to commission a new building to house the council's administration and also provide a venue for events.

The council organised a competition in 1964, which was won by the Griffiths Lewis Goad Partnership, described by Nikolaus Pevsner as a firm of "three very young architects". The winning design offered two large function rooms, the largest with a capacity of 700 people. The building was designed in the Brutalist style and clad in pre-cast concrete. The first phase of the building, consisting of the offices and events venue, was opened by Katharine, Duchess of Kent on 14 March 1970. The proposed second phase, a council hall, was never built. Sculpture for the building was commissioned from Diana Dean.

The building ceased to be the local seat of government when the enlarged Wakefield Council was formed in 1974. However, the building continued to be used as a local events venue. In 1980, Henry Moore donated a sculpture, "Draped Reclining Figure", which was placed outside the building, but it was removed in 2012 due to concerns around possible theft.

In 2022, the council considered closing the events spaces due to increases in energy prices. The following year, the council described the building as "under-utilised", and proposed to sell it off.

== Architecture ==
The five-storey offices and three-storey events space form two sides of a square, on Ferrybridge Road, and the two are linked only at ground floor level. They are clad in precast concrete. There is a basement car park. The offices consist of two blocks linked by a staircase and lift tower, with each storey stepped back from the one below.
