= All Saints' Church, Castleford =

Anglican Church in Castleford, West Yorkshire, England

All Saints' Church
- Church of All Saints
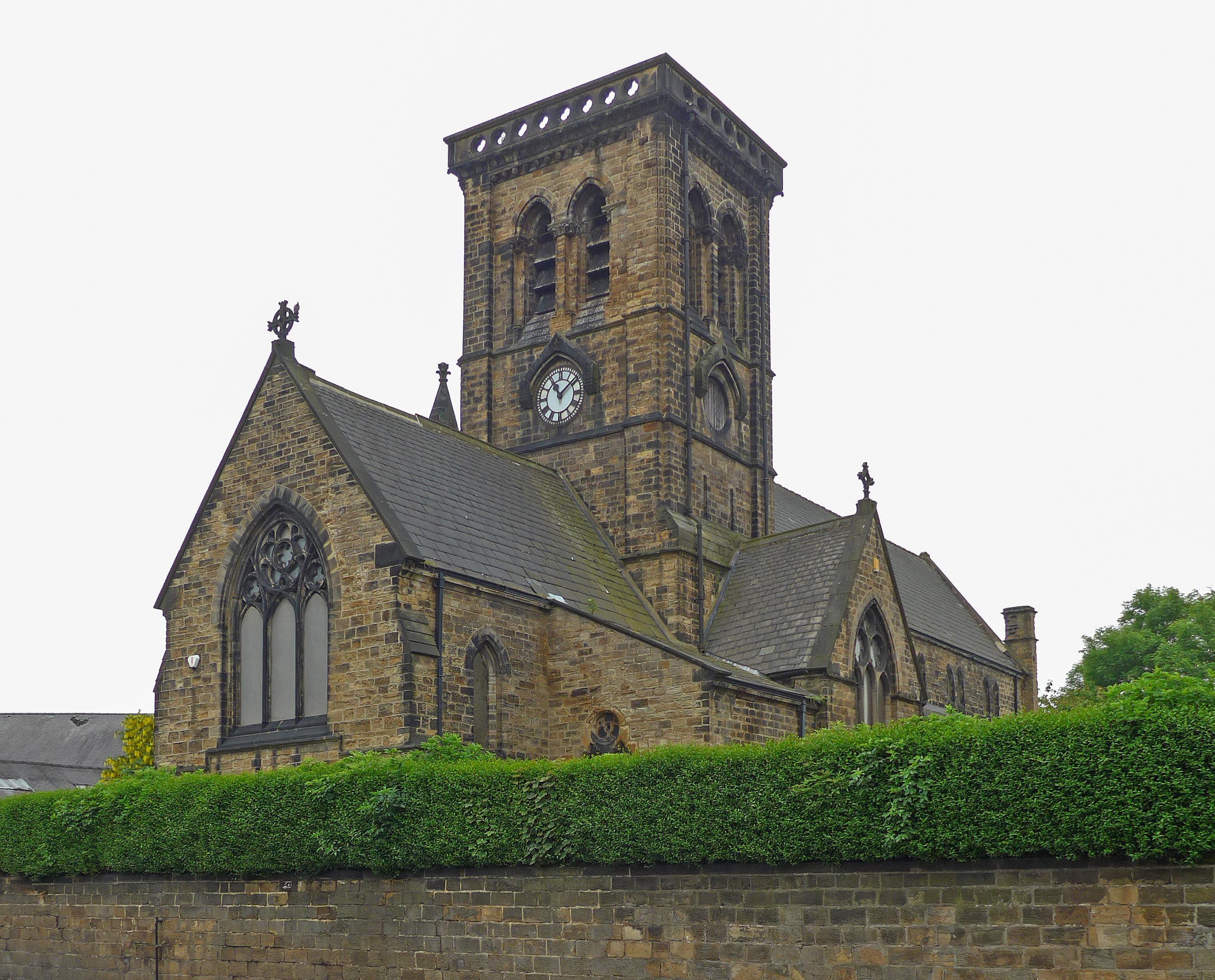
- All Saints' Church
- 53.7265°N 1.3564°W
- OS grid reference: SE425257
- Location: Albion Street, Castleford, West Yorkshire
- Country: England
- Denomination: Anglican

History
- Status: Parish church

Architecture
- Completed: 1866

Administration
- Province: York
- Diocese: Leeds
- Parish: Castleford

Clergy
- Bishop(s): Rt. Rev. Tony Robinson, Bishop of Wakefield

The Church of All Saints in Castleford, West Yorkshire, England is an active Anglican parish church in the archdeaconry of Leeds and the Diocese of Leeds. The church is Grade II listed. All Saints is one of the three Anglican churches in town; the others being All Saints at Hightown and St Paul the Apostle.

== History ==
The church was built to a design by H. F. Bacon and was completed in 1866.

== Architectural style ==
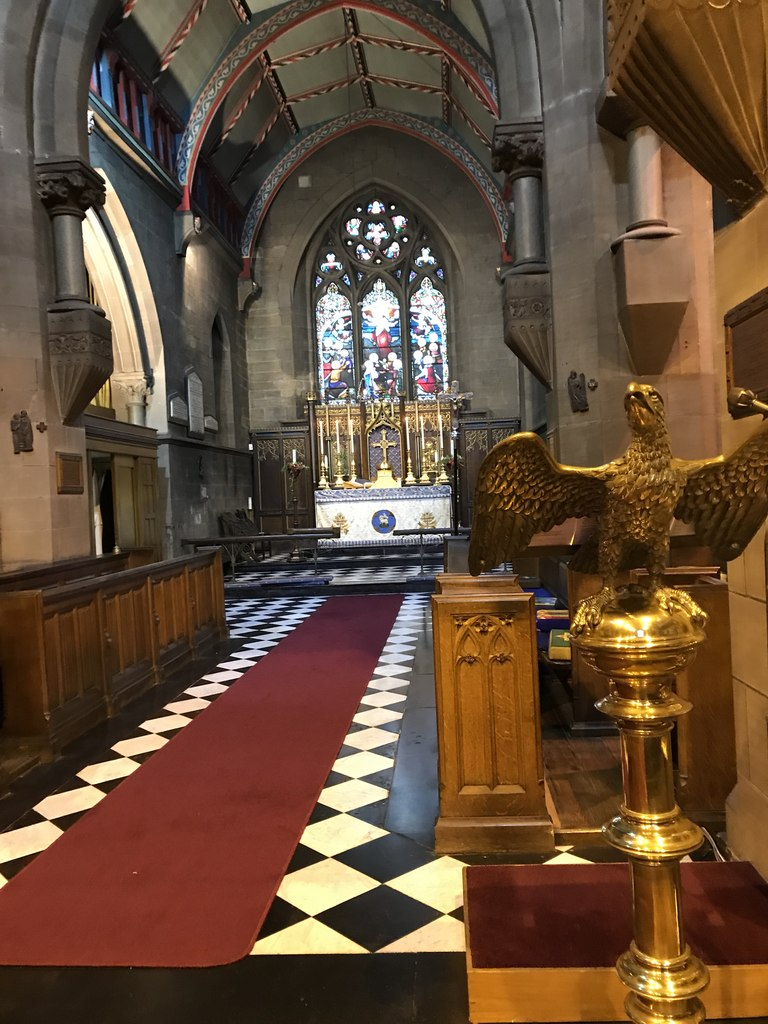
Interior

The church is built of hammer-dressed sandstone with a slate roof. The five-bay nave has both north and south aisles with a crossing tower, a south gabled porch and north and south transepts. The buttressed north aisle has a weathered plinth, two-centred arched window with two cusped lights with hood moulds with figured stops. The crossing tower has two stages and corner pilasters and a white clock face with hood mould and two recessed louvred belfry windows with set in shafts at each side.

== See also ==
- Listed buildings in Castleford
