= Diana Dean =

Canadian artist (born 1942)

- Born: Diana Bridget Alice Dean; September 29, 1942; Bulawayo, Zimbabwe
- Known for: sculptor, painter
- Website: dianadean.com

Diana Bridget Alice Dean RCA (born September 29, 1942) is a Canadian artist who has been based on Saltspring Island since 1982.

== Biography ==
Born in Bulawayo, Zimbabwe, then the British colony of Rhodesia, Dean's parents were from Yorkshire, England. They divorced in 1952 and Dean left Africa with her mother to return to England where they struggled financially. It was Dean's immigration away from Africa back to England at the age of ten that prompted her to turn to art and the landscapes of her mind. Dean was accepted to grammar school and studied science before turning to art. Dedicating herself to sculpture, she hitchhiked to St Ives, Cornwall and studied informally with Denis Mitchell before formal training under John Hoskin at the Bath School of Art and Design between 1961 and 1964. It was through these mentors that she had occasion to meet Barbara Hepworth in the 1960s. Dean emigrated to Canada in 1975 when her husband, an architect, accepted a teaching position at Carleton University. In 1979 she and her family moved again to Vancouver. After her divorce she took three of her four sons to live on an undeveloped piece of land on Saltspring Island, feeding them on a camp fire and living in two tents while overseeing the construction of a home.

== Art ==
Dean had her first solo sculpture show in 1966 at the Association of International Artists' Gallery in London and has had 21 solo exhibitions across England and Canada. In 1970 she was commissioned to do a public sculpture for the new Castleford Civic Centre and created "Symmetry in Opposition."

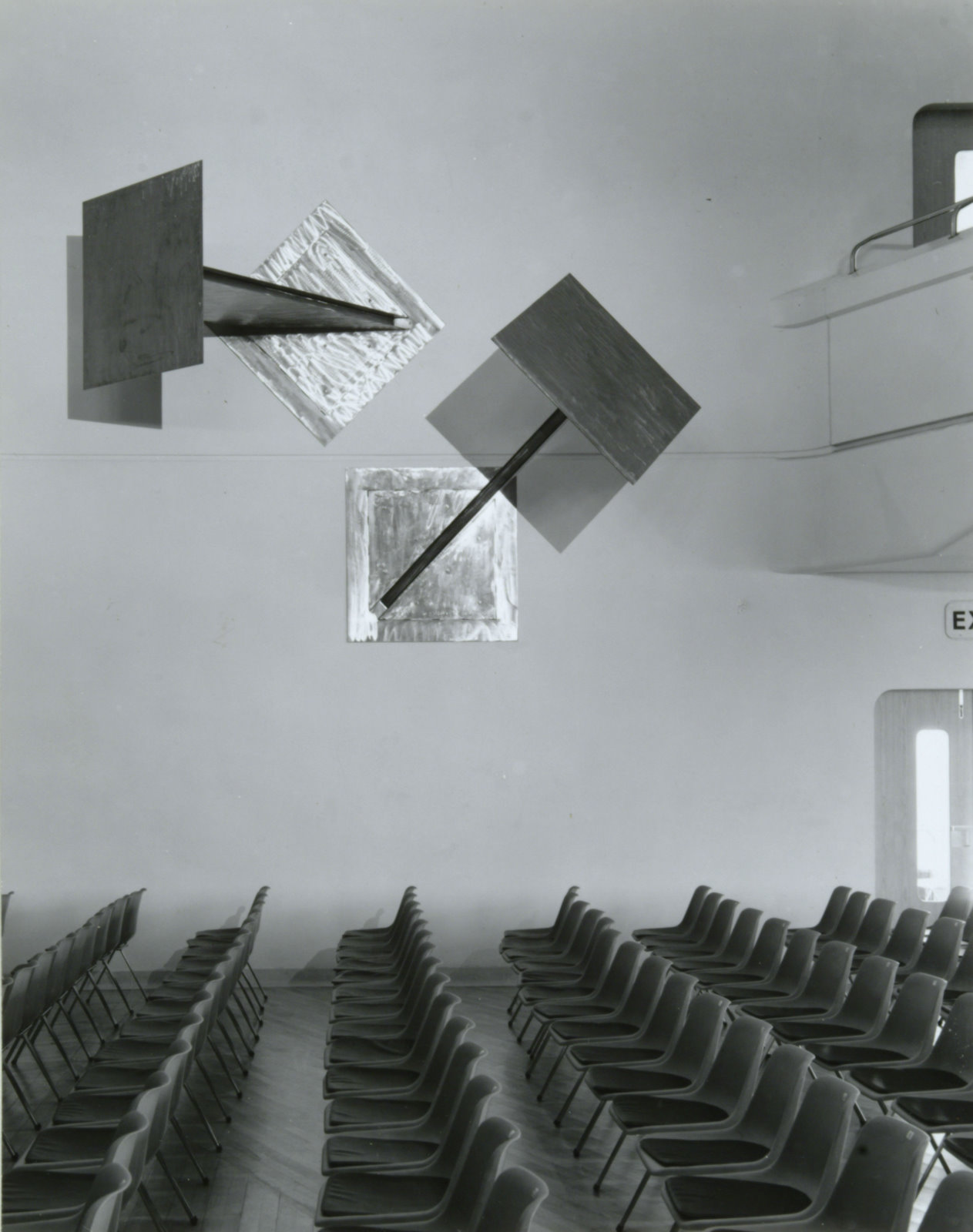
Symmetry in Opposition, Stainless Steel, Castleford Civic Centre, West Yorkshire, UK, 1970.

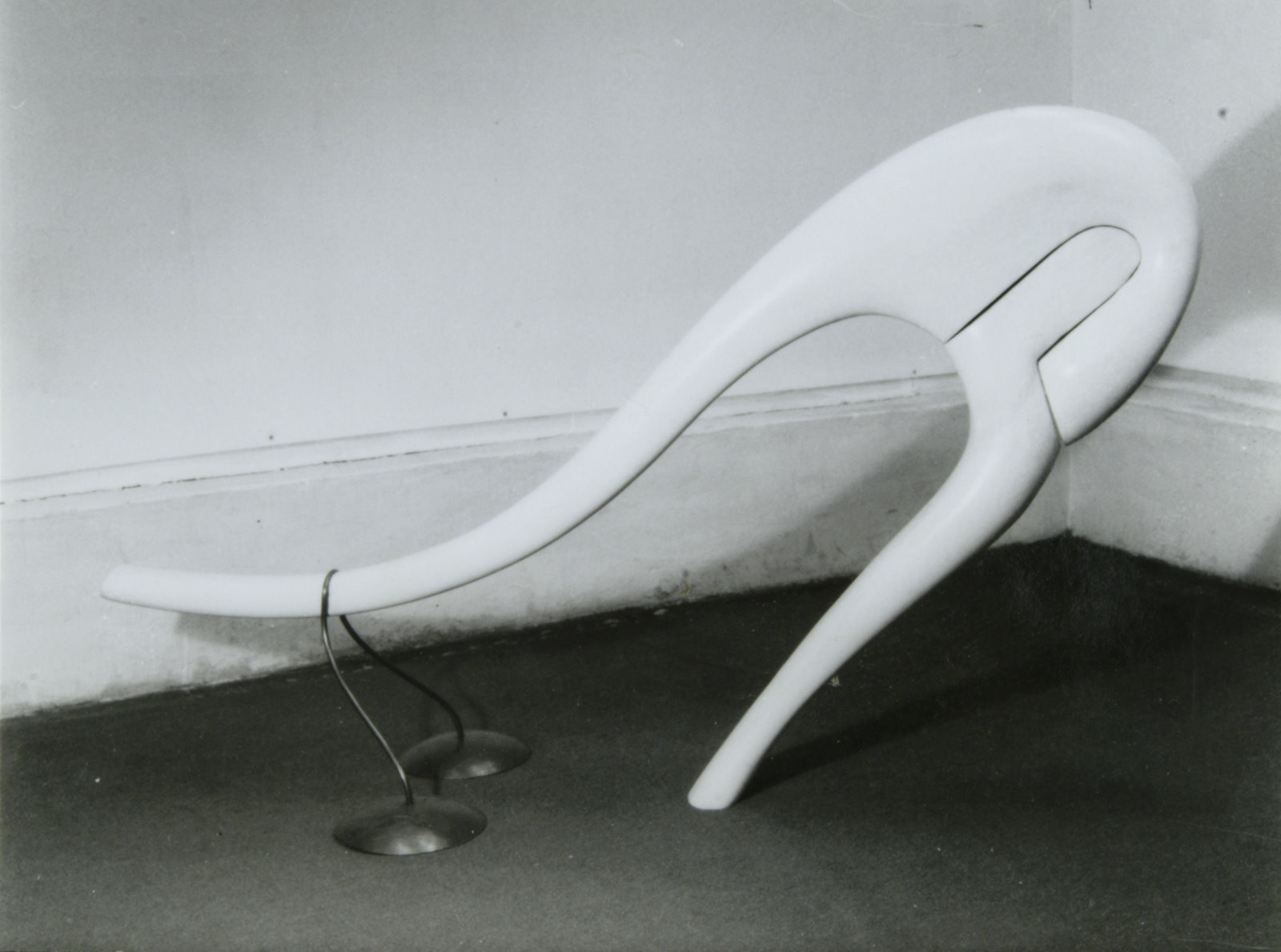
Carved Lime wood and lead. 6' in length, 1965, Now Lost.

Despite earning a distinction in sculpture at university and subsequent awards for her sculptural work, Dean turned to painting after emigrating to Canada for lack of resources and space. Her initial dedication to abstraction gradually gave way to increasing realism. The stylistic influence of the Renaissance masters and modernists such as Van Gogh or Balthus are evident in her figural work. She often casts everyday characters into mythological or spiritual narratives drawn from diverse cultures and periods as in "Innana Descending into the Underworld" (1986), "The Ritual" (1986) or her self-portrait as "Diana the Huntress" (1994).

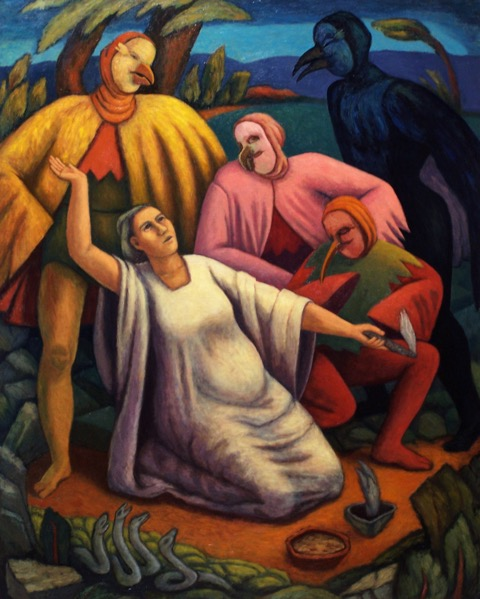
The Ritual 3 oil on canvas painting 1989

Drawing heavily on personal biography, the artist has repeatedly addressed issues of female strength, independence, and empowerment. Works such as "Woman Pushing a Rock Up a Hill" (1984), "He Lit a Fire as the Morning Mist Arose" (1992) and "Seven Stages of Woman" (1999) simultaneously reflect personal struggles and common feminist concerns.

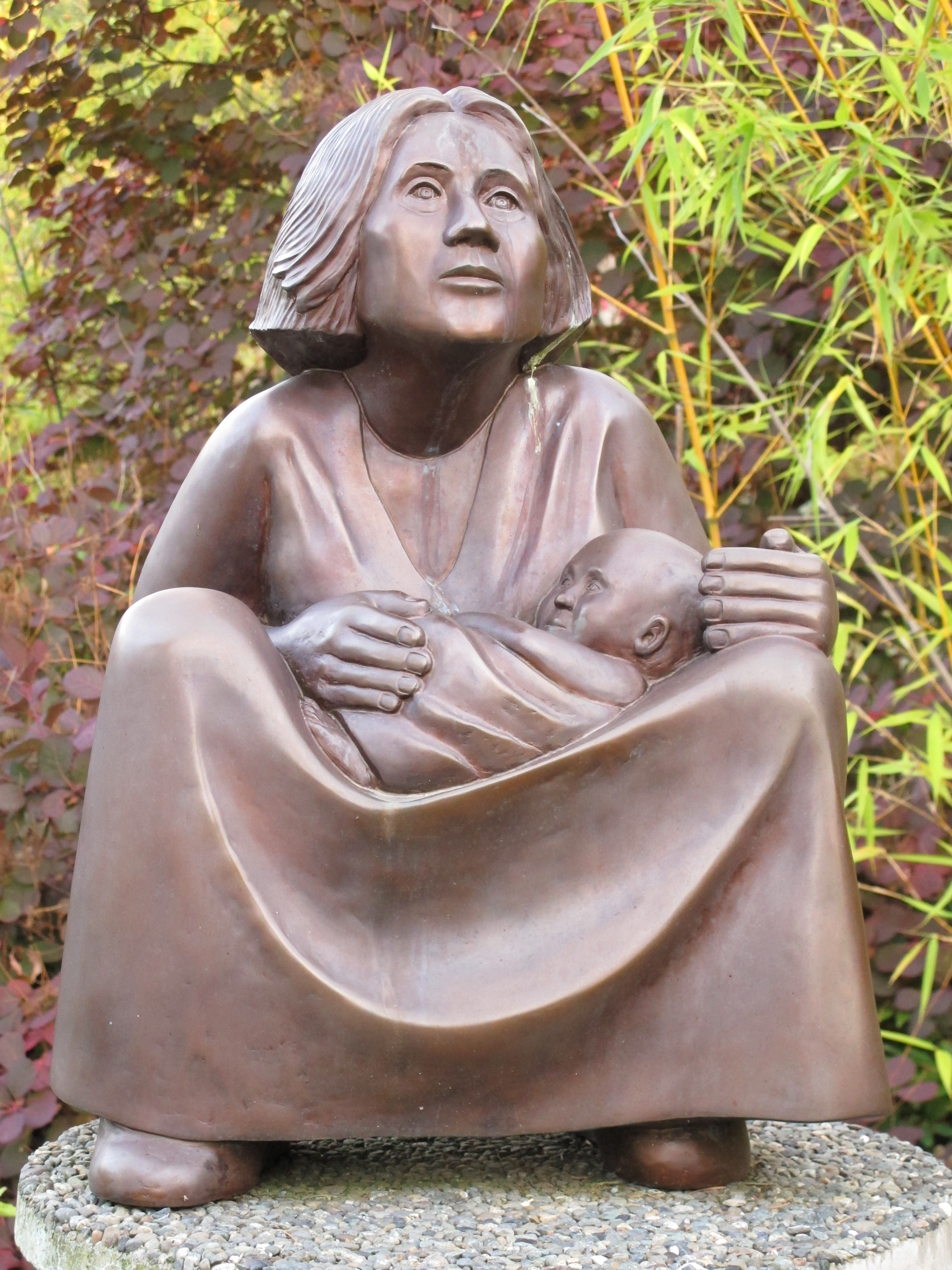
Mother and Child, Bronze sculpture in the artist's garden, 1974

The natural beauty of the landscape and coastline of British Columbia has also been a major theme in her work since the late 1980s and continues to inspire her work. In this regard she follows in the footsteps of the Group of Seven, particularly Emily Carr.

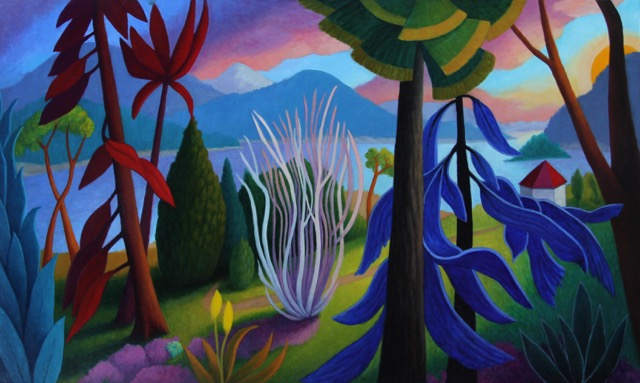
Moving Towards the Light, oil on canvas, 2015

Her work is held by numerous public and private collections across Canada including the MacLaren Art Centre, the Canada Council Art Bank, Confederation Centre of the Arts, and the Surrey Art Gallery in BC. In 2009 Dean exhibited at the Florence Biennale with a panel, "The Kitchen," from her Banquet Series, a 68-foot-long series of 10 canvases completed over the course of a decade. In 2016 Dean was inducted into the Royal Canadian Academy of Arts.
