= Colin Robertson =

Colin Robertson may refer to:

- Colin Robertson (fur trader) (1783–1842), Canadian fur trader and political figure
- Colin MacLeod Robertson (1870–1951), British sailor
- Colin Robertson (diplomat) (born 1954), Canadian diplomat
- Colin Robertson (footballer) (born 1957), Australian rules footballer
- Colin Robertson (cricketer) (born 1963), Zimbabwean cricketer
- Colin Robertson (born 1983), known as Millennial Woes, Scottish far-right polemicist and public speaker

== See also ==
- Colin Roberts (disambiguation)
