= Bob Tomlinson =

English footballer

Personal information
- Full name: Robert Tomlinson
- Place of birth: Castleford, West Riding of Yorkshire, England
- Height: 5 ft 8 in (1.73 m)
- Position: Outside forward

Senior career*
Years	Team	Apps	(Gls)
- Castleford Town
- Harrogate
1930–1931	York City	3	(1)
- Castleford Town
Total		3	(1)
- * Club domestic league appearances and goals

Robert Tomlinson was an English professional footballer who played as an outside forward in the Football League for York City, and in non-League football for Castleford Town and Harrogate.
