= Listed buildings in Castleford =

Castleford is a town in the metropolitan borough of the City of Wakefield, West Yorkshire, England. The town and the surrounding area contain 13 listed buildings that are recorded in the National Heritage List for England. All the listed buildings are designated at Grade II, the lowest of the three grades, which is applied to "buildings of national importance and special interest". The listed buildings include houses and associated structures, farm buildings, a bridge, a church, a public urinal, a public house, a former miners' institute, and a former school.

== Buildings ==
Name and location	Photograph	Date	Notes
Gate piers northwest of Fryston Hall Farmhouse; 53.73320°N 1.28991°W	—	Early to mid 18th century	The pair of gate piers to the former Fryston Hall are in magnesian limestone, with a square section, and are about 3.5 metres (11 ft) high. Each pier is rusticated up to a chamfered band, above which is a deep frieze with a roundel in each side, a moulded cornice, and a moulded pedestal carrying a ball finial.
Stable block, Fryston Hall Farm; 53.73223°N 1.28964°W		Early to mid 18th century	The stable block is in magnesian limestone with a hipped stone slate roof. There are two storeys, a rectangular plan, and a symmetrical front of nine bays, the middle three bays projecting under an open pediment. In the centre is a round-arched entry with impost bands, flanked by coved niches. In the outer bays are rectangular windows in the ground floor and low windows above, and in the centre of the roof is the square base of a former clock tower with a blind oculus on each side.
Moor House; 53.71578°N 1.39097°W	—	Mid to late 18th century	A brick house, the right return wall rendered, with a hipped slate roof. There is a T-shaped plan, with a front block of three storeys and two bays, and a two-storey rear wing. On the front is a doorway with a fanlight and a rendered surround, and the windows are sashes with shallow segmental heads. In the rear wing are sliding sash windows.
Cart shed south-southwest of Fryston Hall Farmhouse; 53.73244°N 1.28983°W	—	Late 18th century	The cart shed is in rendered magnesian limestone with a stone slate roof. There is a single storey, a rectangular plan, and three bays. On the south front are three large round-headed arched entrances with stepped surrounds and plain voussoirs.
Castleford Bridge; 53.72840°N 1.34962°W		1805–08	The bridge carries Lock Lane (A656 road) over the River Calder. It was designed by Bernard Hartley and built by Jesse Hartley. The bridge is in sandstone, and consists of three segmental arches with rusticated voussoirs. The keystone on the east side is scrolled, and that on the west side is vermiculated. The bridge has a guilloché frieze, plain parapets with rounded coping, lettered panels, triangular cutwaters and canted piers. The end piers have blind panels, splayed voussoirs, modillioned cornices, and panelled parapets. The north approach is ramped and at the ends are drum terminals.
Granary with dovecote, Methley Bridge Farm; 53.72548°N 1.37960°W	—	Early 19th century	The granary and dovecote are in brick with a corrugated sheet roof. There are three storeys and a loft, and a single bay. In the south front are a segmental-arched wagon entry and square windows, and in the loft is a round-arched opening with a perching ledge.
Gate piers south of Stable block, Fryston Hall Farm; 53.73210°N 1.28952°W	—	19th century	There are two pairs of gate piers in sandstone, with a square section, about 3.5 metres (11 ft) high. Each pier has banded rustication, and a square moulded cap. The inner and outer piers on each side are linked by short screen walls.
All Saints Church; 53.72651°N 1.35629°W		1866	The church is in sandstone with a slate roof, and is in Early English style. It consists of a nave with a clerestory, north and south aisles, a south porch, north and south transepts, a chancel, and a tower at the crossing. The tower has two stages, corner pilasters, a clock face with a hood mould, a band with ball flower ornament, and a corbelled parapet pierced with quatrefoils. At the southeast corner is an octagonal stair turret with a pinnacle.
Public urinal 53.71580°N 1.33728°W	—	Late 19th or early 20th century	The urinal is in cast iron with ceramic furnishings. It is rectangular, with curved corners at the rear, and has an open top. The structure has decorated plates in vertical columns in a tubular frame. The panels have raised and pierced geometrical patterns, and at the top is a two-tiered grill.
Whitwood Terrace; 53.71311°N 1.38782°W	—	1904	A terrace of 19 houses designed by C. F. A. Voysey in Arts and Crafts style, in roughcast brick, with bands and tiled roofs. Seven of the houses have gables and two storeys, and those between have one storey and an attic. Each house has a central doorway with a fanlight and casement windows. The gabled houses have rectangular bay windows with roofs forming a canopy over the doorway. The other houses have a canopy over the doorway, and hip roofed dormers. At the rear, each house has a recessed segmental-arched porch, a back yard with a brick wall, and a rectangular building.
The Rising Sun Public House; 53.71374°N 1.38676°W		1905	A Miners' Institute and manager's house, later a public house, designed by C. F. A. Voysey in Arts and Crafts style. It is in roughcast brick, with tiled roofs. There is an L-shaped plan, consisting of a long single-storey range, a four-stage tower on the right, and a rear single-storey service wing. The long range has two gabled wings, each containing a mullioned and transomed window, and along the front is a flat-roofed glazed verandah with three doorways. The tower has an oculus in the top stage, an embattled parapet, and a low pyramidal roof.
The Briggs Memorial Hall; 53.71389°N 1.38705°W		c. 1907	The hall, later used for other purposes, was designed by C. F. A. Voysey in Arts and Crafts style. It is in roughcast brick, with a swept tiled roof, and gables with bargeboards. There is a single storey and five bays, each containing a lunette window, with buttresses between the bays. At the east end is a canted flat-roofed porch, above which is an inscribed sandstone plaque, a large lunette, and a hood mould. At each corner at the rear is a small single-cell extension.
Three Lane Ends First School; 53.72470°N 1.37406°W	—	1939–40	A school, later a business centre, it was designed by Oliver Hill. The building is in brick with metal-framed windows, and has a single storey and a curved plan, the concave front facing south. There are eight bays with rounded ends, continuous glazing, and a canopy with clerestory windows above. Projecting at the west end is a higher assembly hall. There is some facing, and a frieze by John Skeaping, in faience.
