= Andrew Townsley =

English cricketer (born 1952)

Richard Andrew John Townsley (born 24 June 1952 in Castleford, Yorkshire, England) is an English first-class cricketer, who played two first-class matches for Yorkshire County Cricket Club in 1974 and 1975, and five List A one day matches in 1975. Townsley also played for the Yorkshire Second XI from 1972 to 1975, and the Yorkshire Under-25s from 1972 to 1976.

A left-handed batsman, Townsley scored 22 first-class runs, with his best score being 12 against Sussex, at an average of 5.50, and he took one catch. He scored 81 runs in one day games, with a best of 34 against Somerset. A right arm medium bowler, he failed to take a wicket in either form of the game, conceding 62 runs in one day cricket.
