= Kryan Johnson =

English Rugby League player

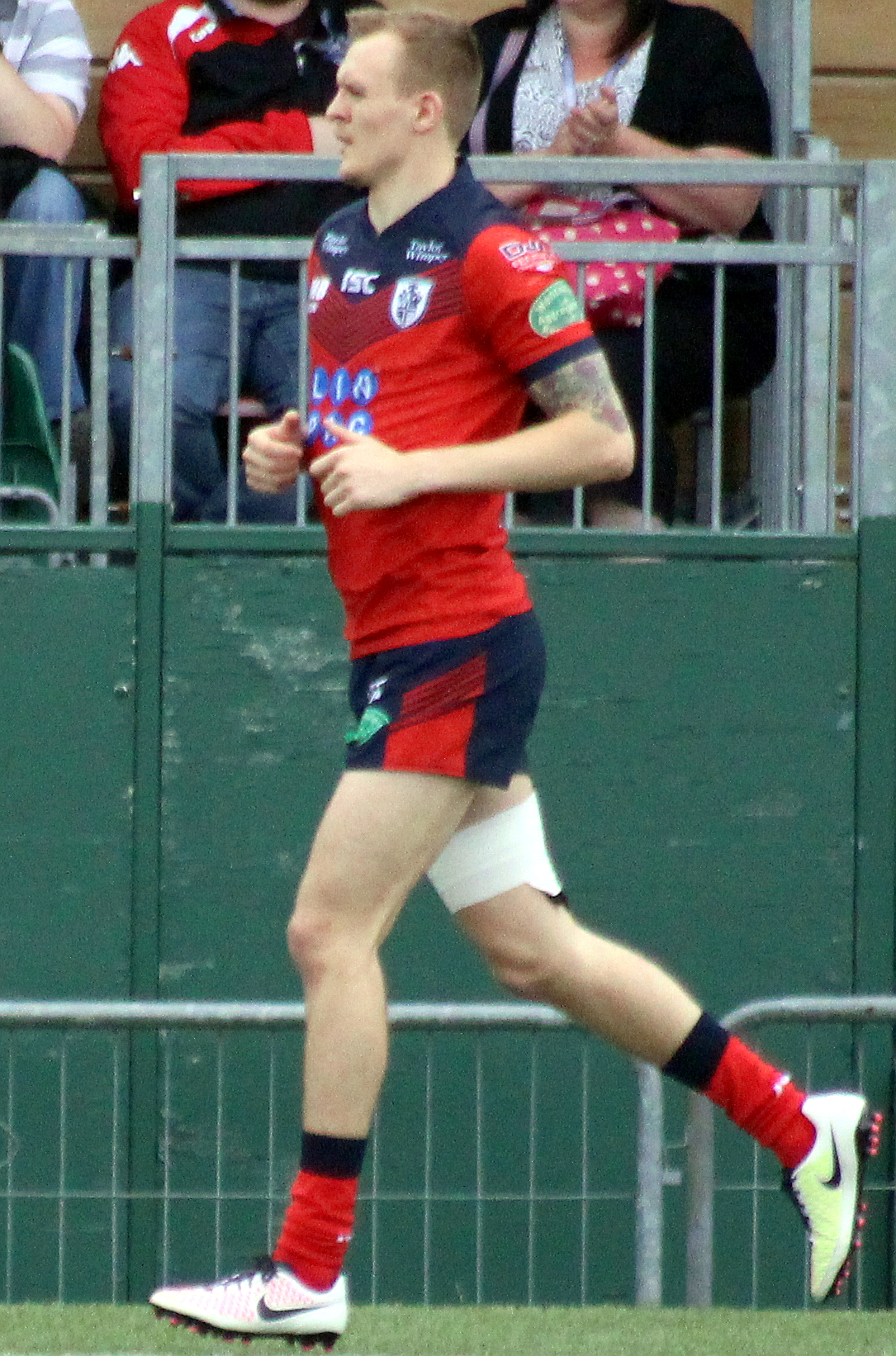

Personal information
- Full name: Kryan Johnson
- Born: 23 March 1994 (age 32) Castleford, England
- Height: 5 ft 11 in (1.80 m)
- Weight: 125 lb (57 kg)

Playing information
- Position: Wing
Club
Years	Team	Pld	T	G	FG	P
2015–17	Featherstone Rovers	27	10	20	0	80
2016(loan)	→ Hunslet Hawks	8	3	0	0	12
2018–21	Oldham	35	12	4	0	56
	Total	70	25	24	0	148
- Source: As of 6 May 2024

Kryan Johnson (born 23 March 1994) was a professional rugby league footballer who last played as a wing for Oldham in the Championship.

Johnson started playing rugby with Lock Lane when he was seven. He joined Featherstone on a junior scholarship when he was 13 but also played for Castleford Panthers until he was 16 when he signed exclusively with Featherstone. He also spent time on loan at the Hunslet Hawks in Kingstone Press League 1. In October 2017 he joined Oldham on a one-year deal.
