= Colin Roberts (footballer) =

English footballer (1933–2017)

Personal information
- Full name: Colin Roberts
- Date of birth: 16 September 1933
- Place of birth: Castleford, England
- Date of death: September 2017 (aged 83–84)
- Place of death: Kirklees, West Yorkshire, England
- Position: Wing half

Senior career*
Years	Team	Apps	(Gls)
19??–1951	Altofts Colliery		
1953–1956	Bradford Park Avenue	75	(0)
1956–1959	Frickley Colliery		
1959–1961	Bradford City	57	(0)
Total		132	(0)
- * Club domestic league appearances and goals

Colin Roberts (16 September 1933 – September 2017) was an English professional footballer who played as a wing half.

== Career ==
Roberts was born in Castleford. He played football for Altofts Colliery before signing for Bradford Park Avenue in 1951. He made his debut in the Football League in the 1953–54 season, and over that and the next two seasons made 75 League appearances for Park Avenue. After returning to non-league football with Frickley Colliery, Roberts spent two seasons back in the league with Bradford City, making 57 further appearances.
