= Castleford =

Town in West Yorkshire, England

Coordinates: 53°43′32″N 1°20′48″W

- Town
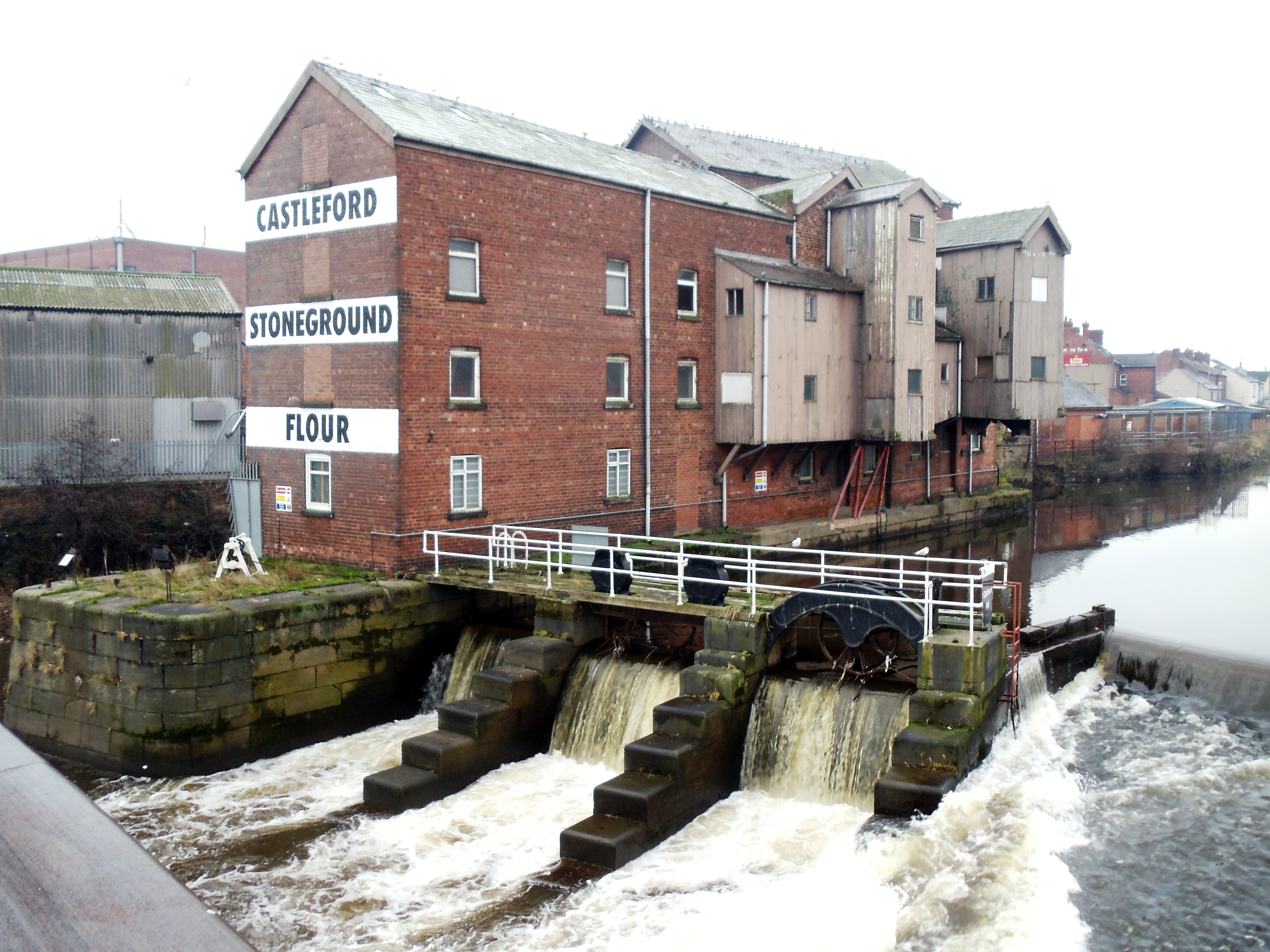
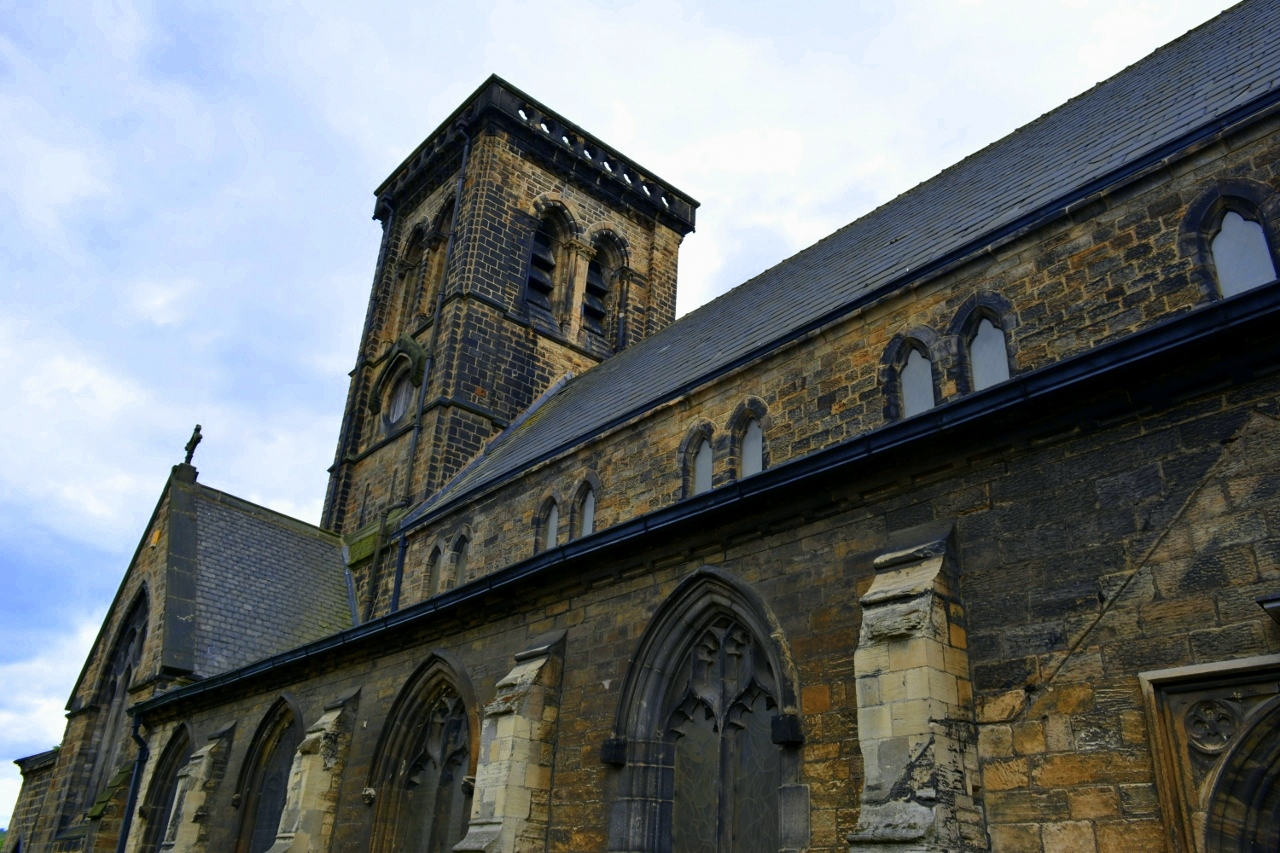
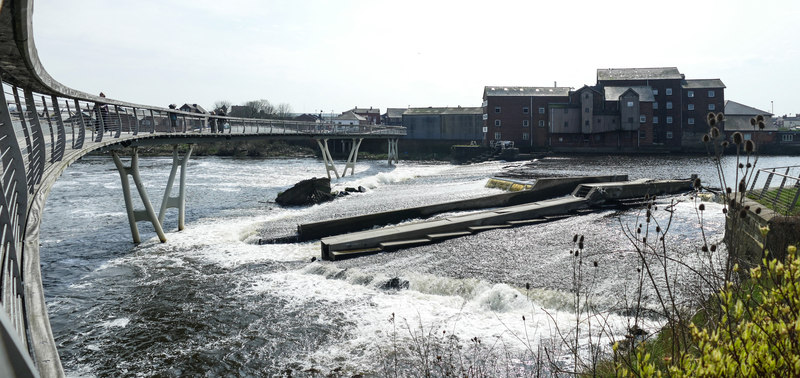
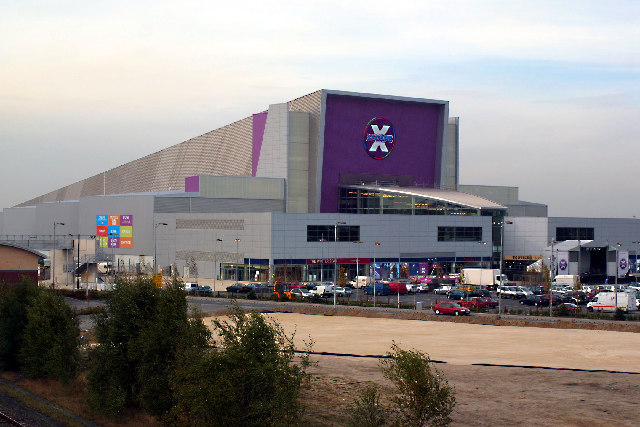
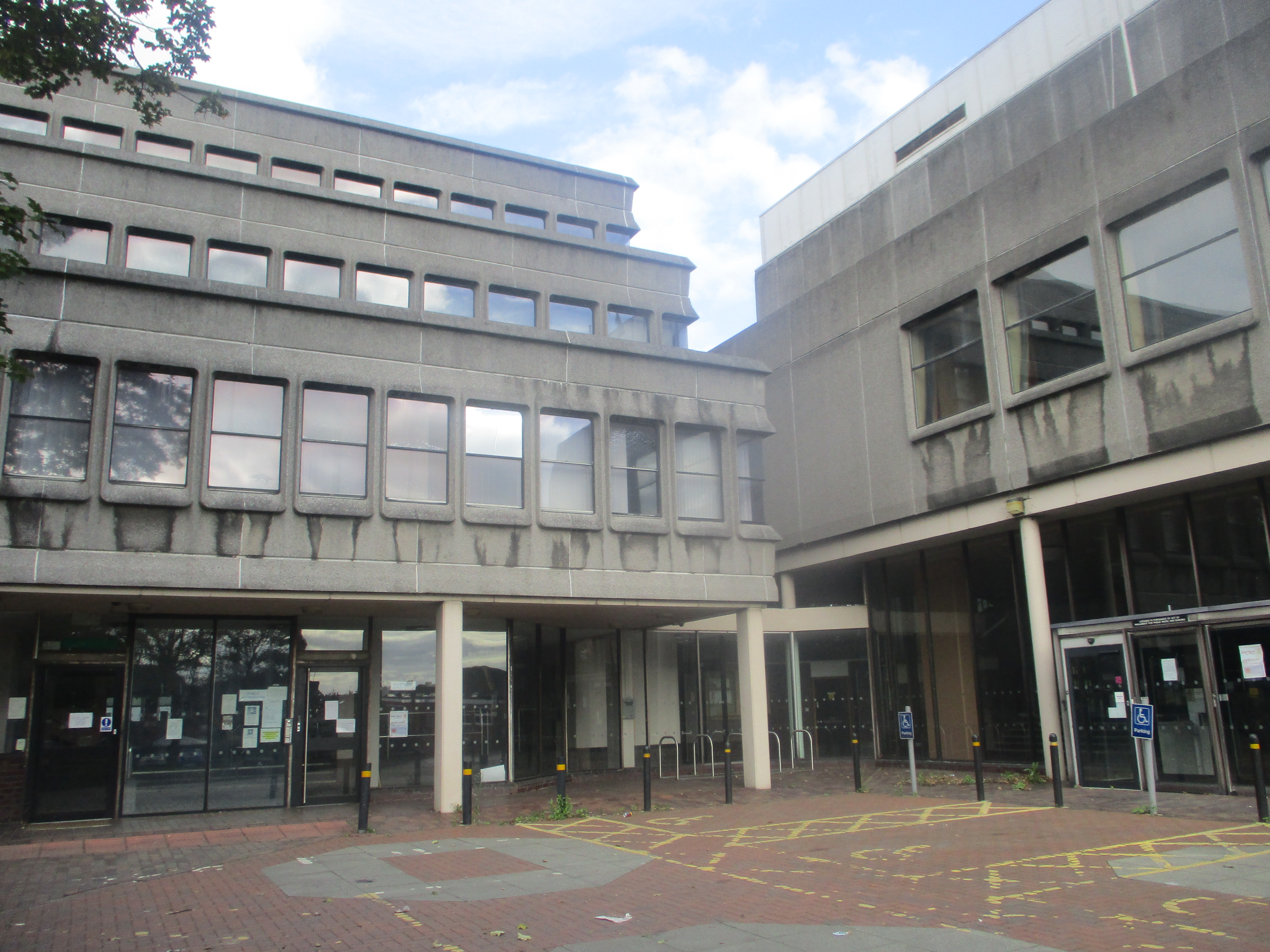
- Allinson Mills All Saints Church The River Aire Xscape Civic Centre

- Coat of arms

- Location within West Yorkshire
- Area: 11.81 km^{2} (4.56 sq mi)
- Population: 45,106 (Wards. Castleford Central and Glasshoughton, Whitwood and Ferry Fryston)
  - Density: 3,819/km^{2} (9,890/sq mi)
- OS grid reference: SE424244
  - London: 160 mi (260 km) SSE
- Metropolitan borough: City of Wakefield
- Metropolitan county: West Yorkshire
- Region: Yorkshire and the Humber
- Country: England
- Sovereign state: United Kingdom
- Areas of the town: List: Airedale; Ferry Fryston
- Post town: CASTLEFORD
- Postcode district: WF10
- Dialling code: 01977
- Police: West Yorkshire
- Fire: West Yorkshire
- Ambulance: Yorkshire
- UK Parliament: Pontefract, Castleford and Knottingley

Castleford is a town within the City of Wakefield district, West Yorkshire, England. It had a population of 45,106 at a 2021 population estimate. Historically in the West Riding of Yorkshire, to the north of the town centre the River Calder joins the River Aire and the Aire and Calder Navigation. It is located north east of Wakefield, north of Pontefract and south east of Leeds. Castleford is the largest town in the Wakefield district after Wakefield itself.

The town is the site of a Roman settlement. Within the historical Municipal Borough of Castleford are the suburbs of Airedale, Cutsyke, Ferry Fryston, Fryston Village, Glasshoughton, Half Acres, Hightown, Lock Lane, Wheldale and Whitwood.

Castleford is home to the rugby league Super League team Castleford Tigers.

== History ==
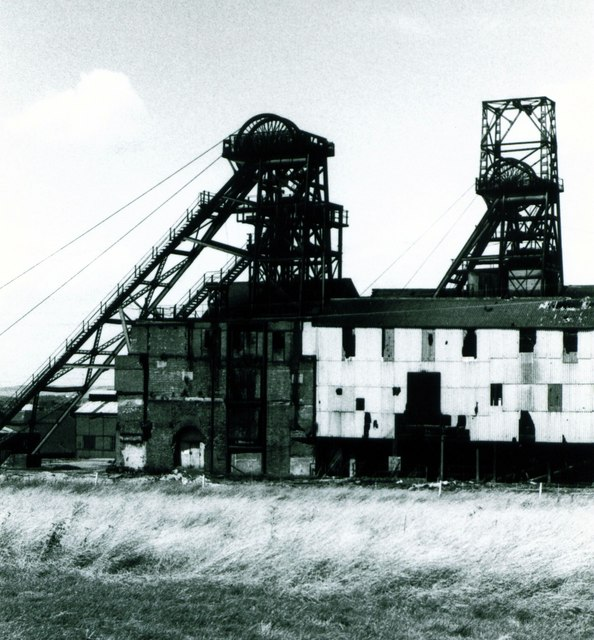
Wheldale Colliery was one of the town's collieries until its closure in 1985.

Castleford's history dates back to Roman times, archaeological evidence points to modern day Castleford being built upon a Roman army settlement which was called Lagentium (thought to mean 'The Place of the Swordsmen'). Roman funeral urns have been found in modern-day Castleford, giving further evidence to this theory. A Roman milestone was unearthed in Beancroft Road, now believed to be in Leeds City Museum.

Queen's Park in Castleford provides evidence of Roundhouses used by the Anglo Saxons. This was a strategic area due to the views of the entire settlement. The history of the area includes Oliver Cromwell's encampment in nearby Knottingley and Ferrybridge (originally thought to be in Castleford itself) whilst his forces laid siege to Pontefract Castle.

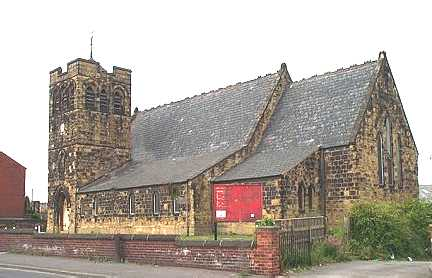
All Saints' Church Hightown

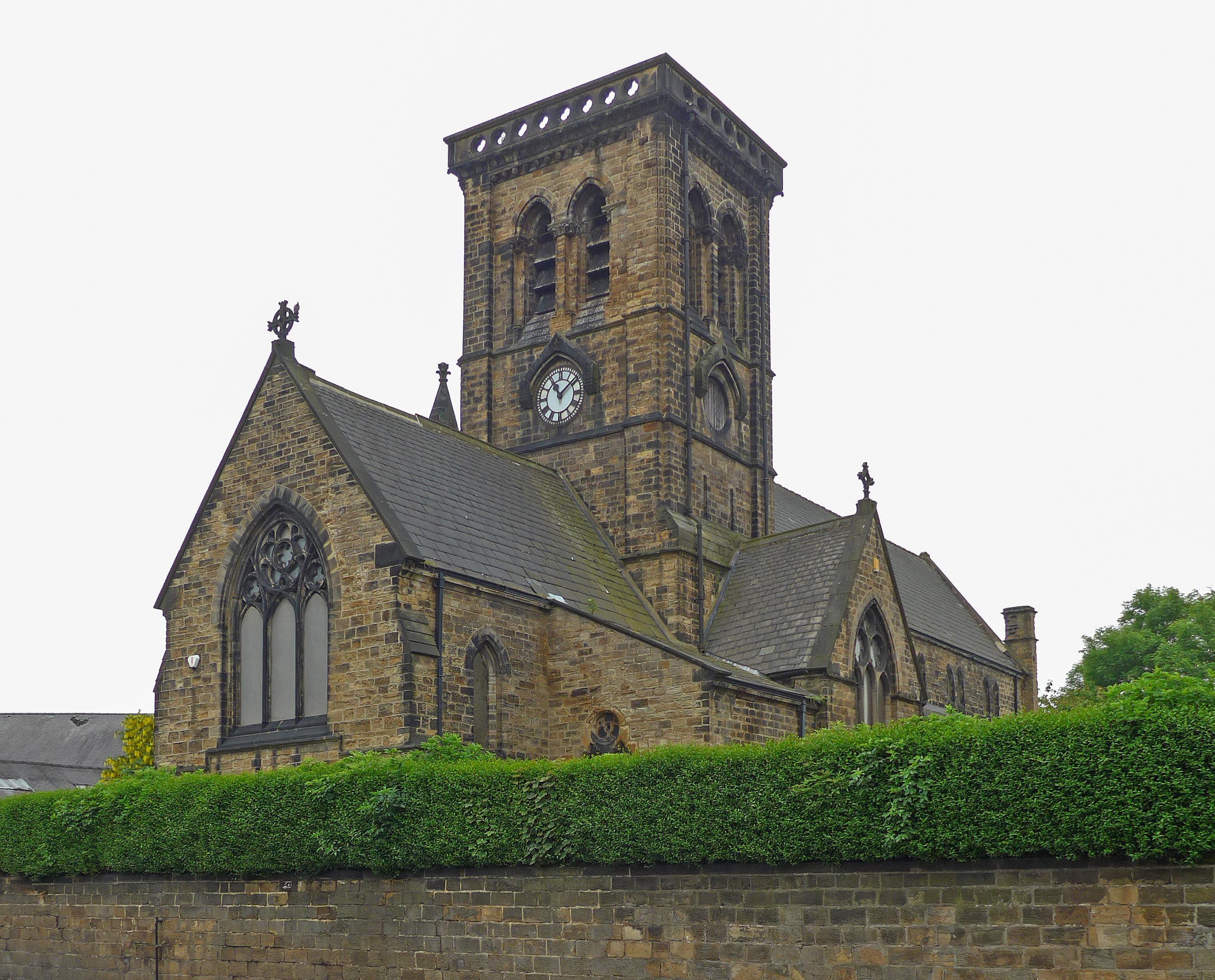
All Saints' Church, Castleford, West Yorkshire

In the 19th century, Castleford became a boomtown with the population growing from 1,000 to 14,000 as collieries opened around the town; however, these collieries closed in the 20th century. Ferrybridge Power Station and Kellingley Colliery have also closed (in 2015 and 2016 respectively) and used to employ Castleford residents. The newer warehouses and distribution centres in Glasshoughton have brought in many new jobs to the area.

Grand Designs presenter Kevin McCloud and Channel 4 led a community regeneration scheme, the Big Town Plan, broadcast in 2008, to help Castleford's redevelopment. Projects included a new footbridge across the River Aire, designed by McDowell+Benedetti architects and opened in 2008.

In February 2017 Castleford Swimming Pool closed. A new modern leisure facility including a swimming pool is proposed for nearby Pontefract Park.

Built in 1890 the underpass/bridge made by Deborah Saunt called the Tickle Cock Bridge was established and was refurbished in 2003 and was closed around Christmas 2005, but was completed in 2008. Also known by its original name The Tittle Cot bridge but was later changed To Tickle Cock and still has a controversial stance.

== Economy ==
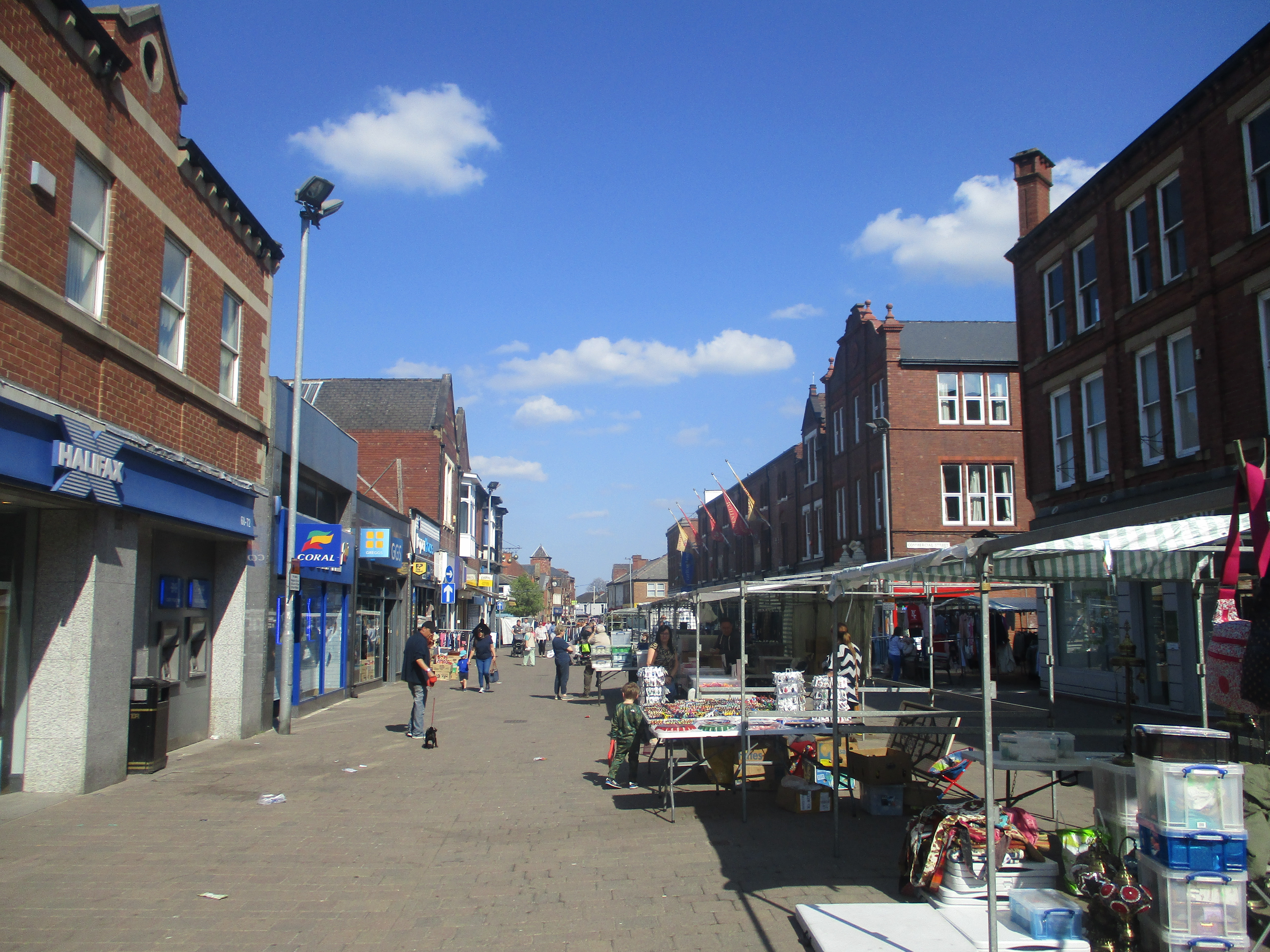
Carlton Street is Castleford's main shopping street.

Castleford had potteries from the early 18th century until 1961, notably the Castleford Pottery (1790–1820) of David Dunderdale, which gave its name to "Castleford-type" stonewares.

Burberry, the retailer and designer label, has a factory in the town, plans were proposed to close this once a new facility was built in Leeds. However these plans were put on hold in 2016 and the factory is due to remain in the town for the foreseeable future. A large Nestlé factory, which produced Toffee Crisp and After Eights for 40 years, closed in 2012 and demolition starting in 2014 to make way for housing. Castleford has previously been home to Dunsford and Wesley Textiles, which at peak business times had three factories in Castleford which have all since ceased production. TEVA also have their UK headquarters here.

== Governance ==
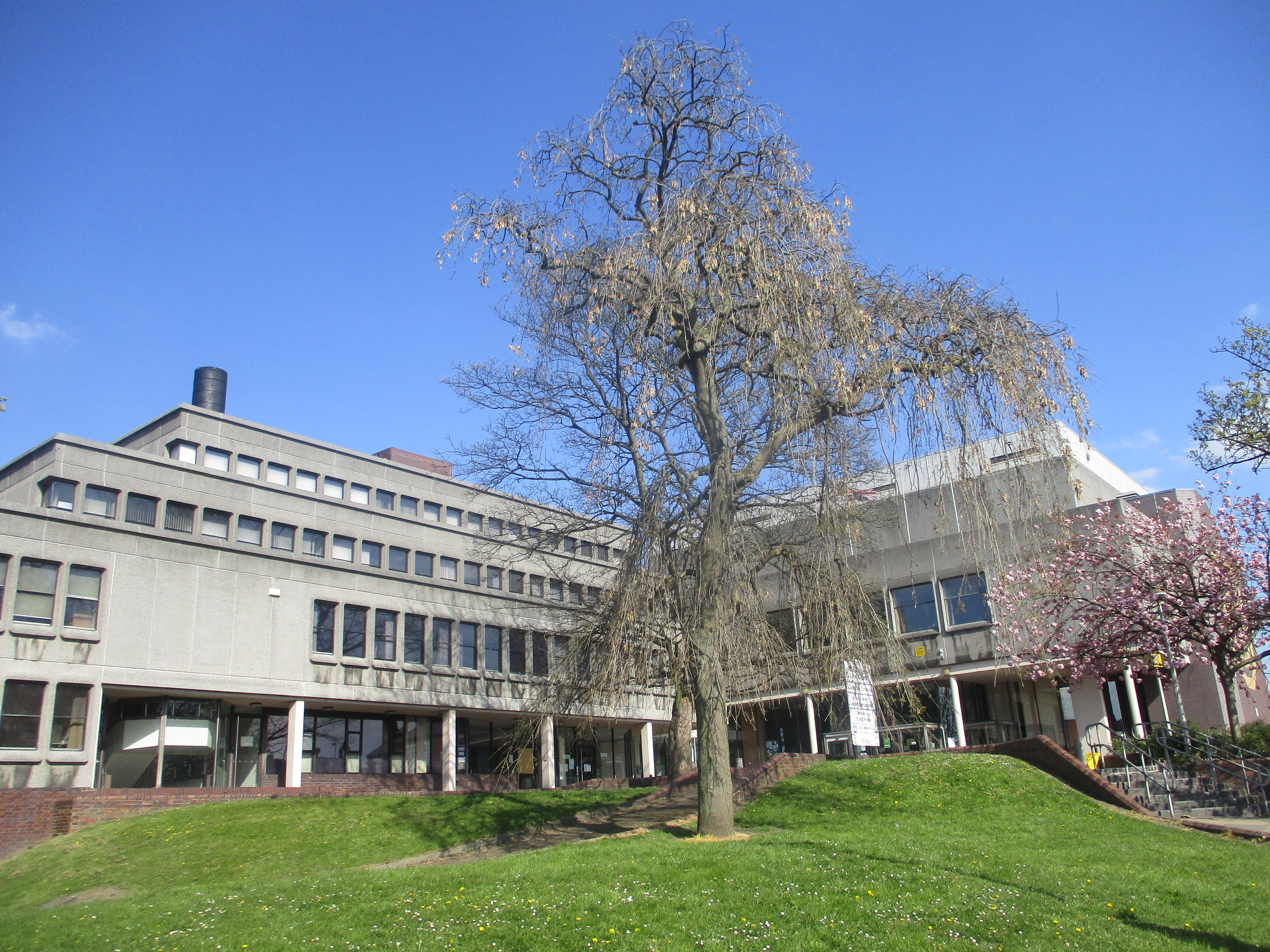
Castleford Civic Centre

Castleford was established as an urban district, in the administrative county of the West Riding of Yorkshire in 1894 under the Local Government Act 1894, with an urban district council. Whitwood and Glasshoughton were added to the district in the 1930s. The urban district was incorporated as a municipal borough in 1955. Castleford Civic Centre was completed in 1970.

Following the Local Government Act 1972, the Municipal Borough of Castleford was abolished on 1 April 1974; it then became an unparished area of the City of Wakefield, a metropolitan borough in West Yorkshire. Castleford is now controlled by Wakefield Council. Three electoral wards cover the town: Airedale and Ferry Fryston; Altofts and Whitwood; and Castleford Central and Glasshoughton.

== Amenities and entertainment ==
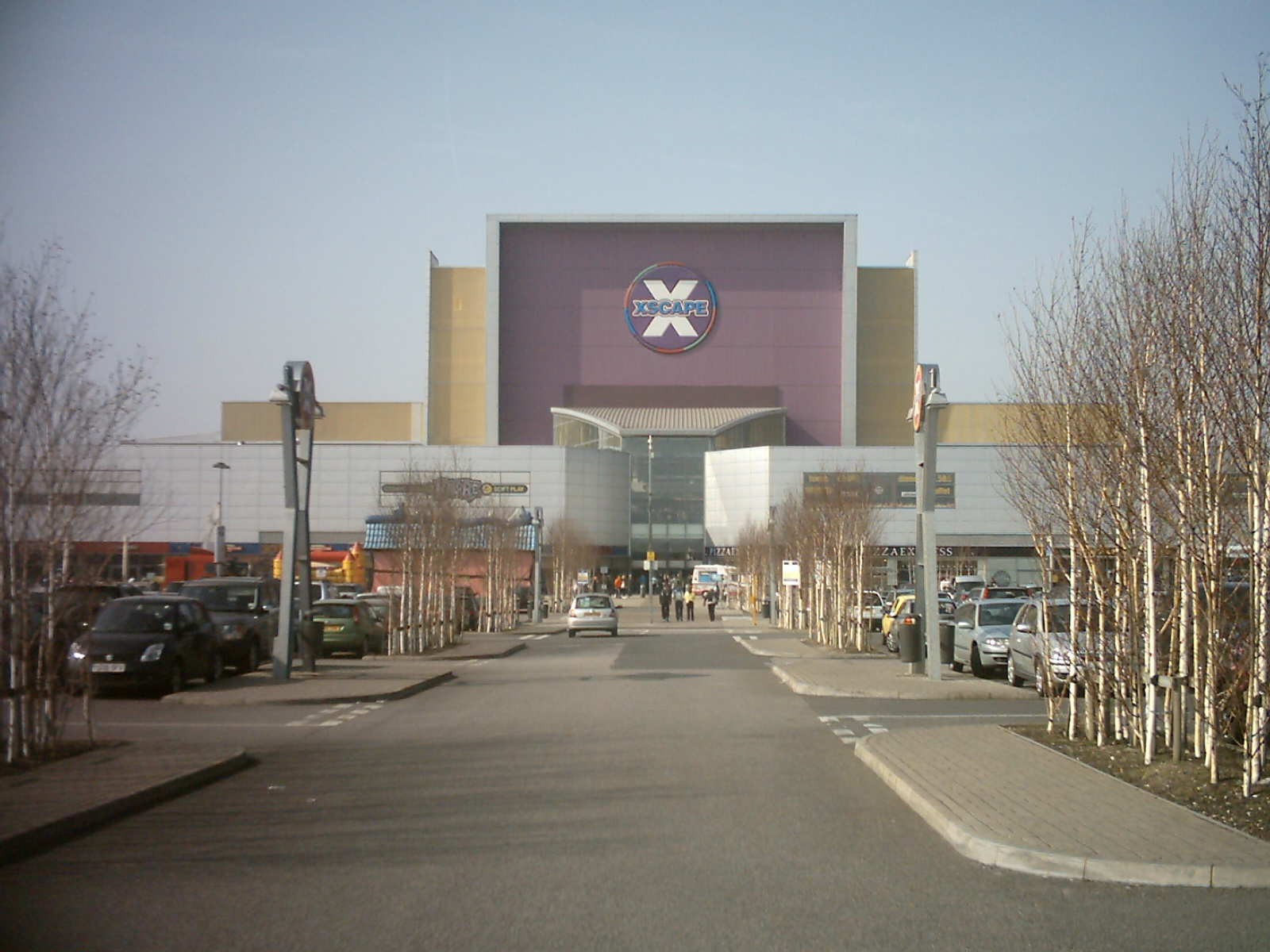
Xscape in Glasshoughton, Castleford

The town contains the Junction 32 multi-store outlet shopping village and the Xscape leisure complex, both in the Glasshoughton suburb at the south of the town. Within Xscape is the large Snozone, which used to have Britain's largest indoor real snow slope; this was later edged out by Chillfactore in Manchester. It is also home to Frankie & Benny's and Nando's restaurants. It was also home to a 14-screen Cineworld, which underwent a refit in 2018 and was home to a 4DX screen and a Screen X. The Cineworld closed on 19 January 2025, with a Vue International cinema replacing it.

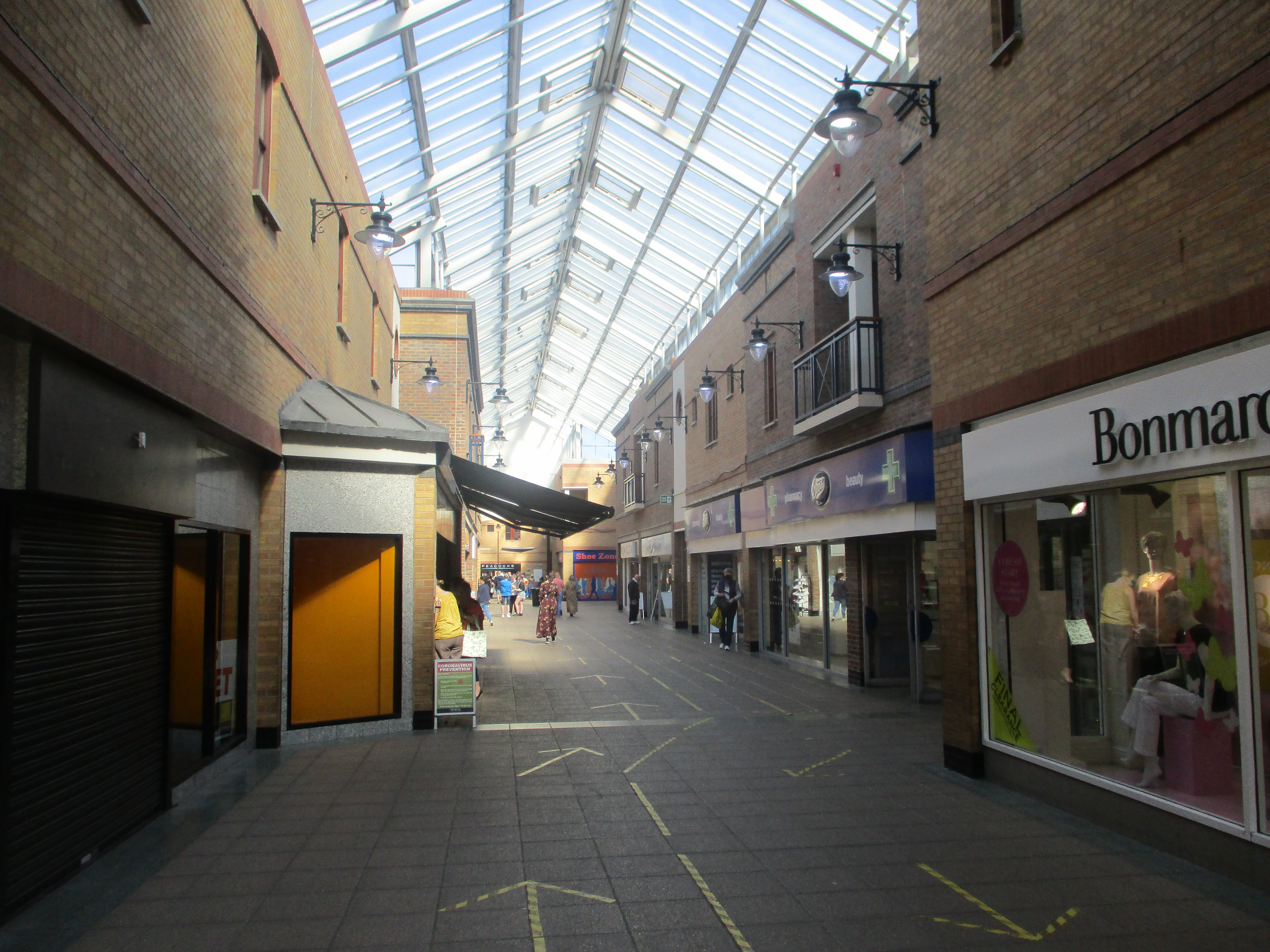
Carlton Lanes shopping centre

Castleford has an open and an indoor market, Carlton Lanes shopping centre (located on Carlton Street) and a retail park; in addition, Asda, Morrisons and Aldi supermarkets are located there.

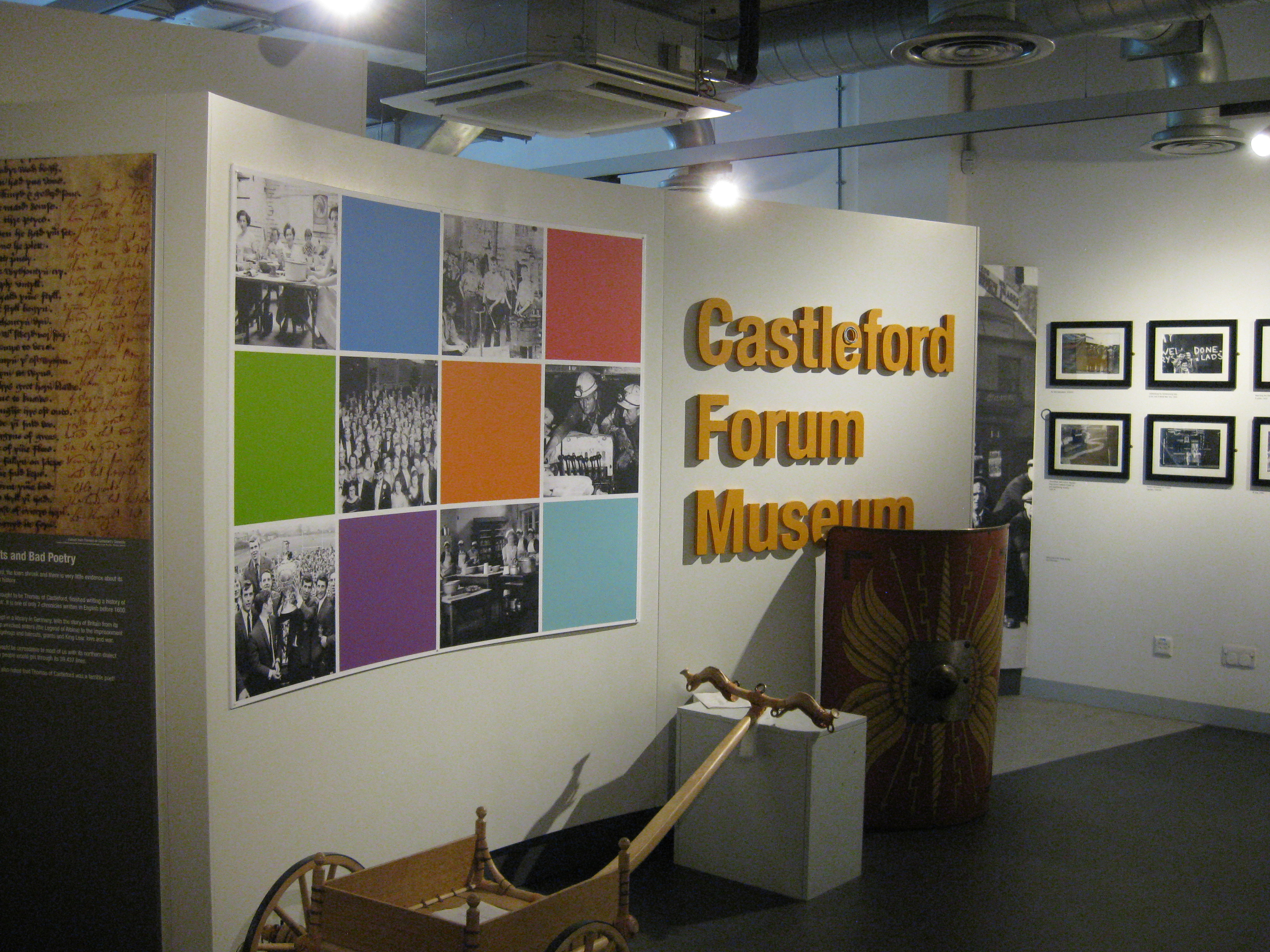
Entry to the Castleford Forum Museum

In December 2013, the Castleford Forum Museum, a library and heritage museum, opened in a new building. The town's library had been in temporary accommodation for two years, while the old site was redeveloped. The existing frontage was kept, while the building further back was demolished. A new three-floor building was then constructed.

The town centre has public houses, bars and social clubs, although the number of these has declined in recent years with leisure becoming focused on the Xscape complex. In 2000, three nightclubs were situated in the town centre; today, none remain.

== Media ==
Local news and television programmes are provided by BBC Yorkshire and ITV Yorkshire. Television signals are received from the Emley Moor TV transmitter.

The town's local radio stations are BBC Radio Leeds on 92.4 FM, Greatest Hits Radio Yorkshire on 106.8 FM, Heart Yorkshire on 106.2 FM, Capital Yorkshire on 105.1 FM and 5 Towns FM, a community online radio station serving the town and surrounding areas.

The local newspaper is a weekly called Pontefract and Castleford Express.

Stoneground Records is a local independent record label named after the Stoneground Flour Mills on the River Aire.

== Transport ==
=== Roads ===
Castleford is only 0.93 miles (1.5 km) away from the M62 at Junction 32 via the A656 road. It has other A roads that criss-cross the town and provide access to Junction 31 on the same motorway.

=== Waterways ===
The rivers Aire and Calder have a confluence just north-west of the town and also feed the Aire and Calder Navigation. Whilst it is an industrial waterway, it also hosts tourism with moorings on the Castleford Cut of the Navigation.

=== Railways ===
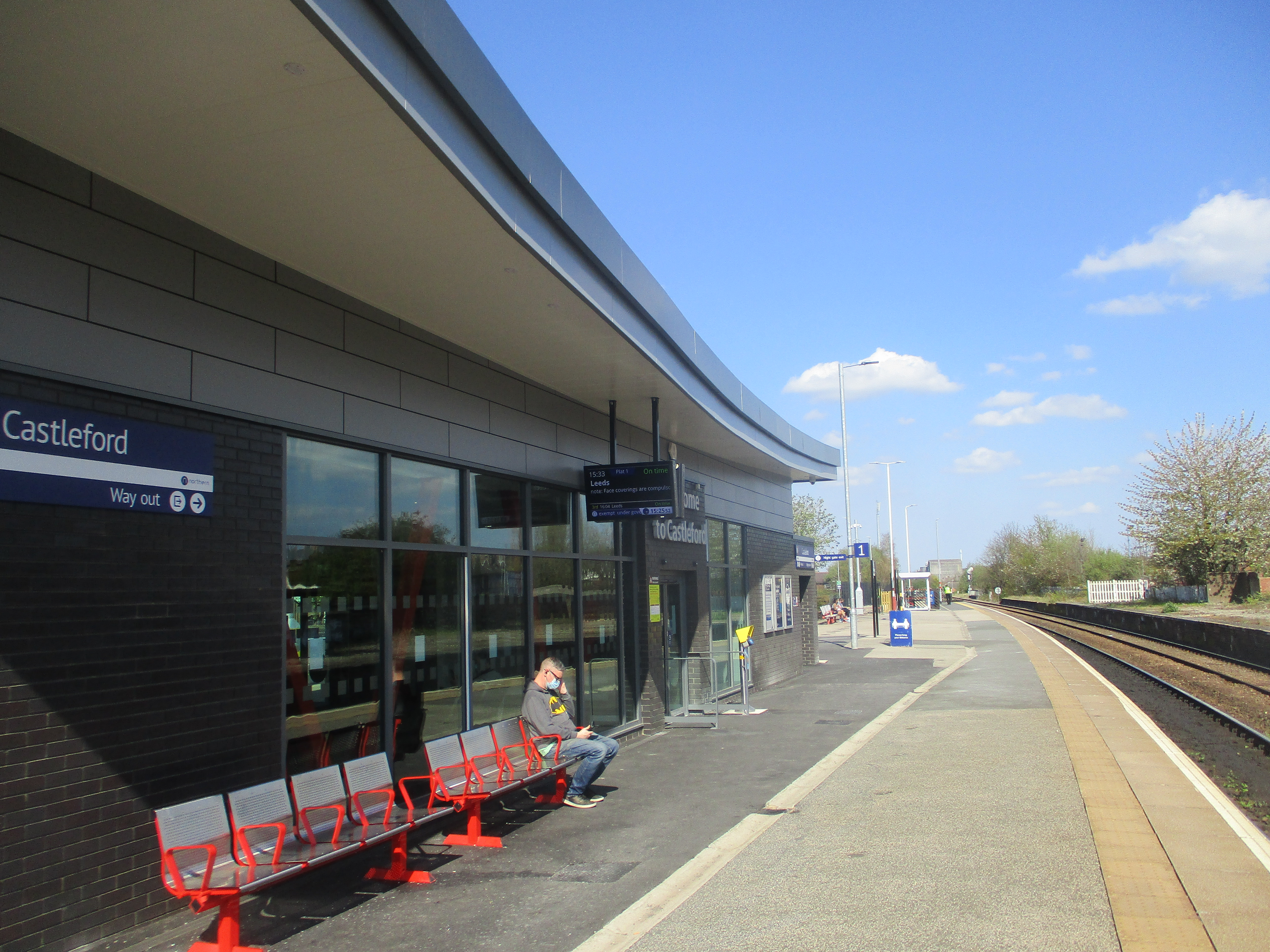
Castleford railway station in 2021

Castleford railway station is situated on both the Hallam and Pontefract lines; these lines connect the town directly with Leeds, Barnsley, Goole, Pontefract and Sheffield. All trains arrive from the west and leave in that same direction. In January 2021, the station was completely revamped, providing a modern waiting facility, sheltered cycle parking and changes to the car park layout.

Train services used to travel eastwards to York, via Burton Salmon, but passenger workings ceased in 1970 with the section retained for freight workings only. Castleford also had a second service to Leeds that left the station eastwards and swung north onto the former Castleford–Garforth line, which saw services calling at Ledston and Kippax, before arriving in Garforth and continuing to Leeds. In December 2023, services were restored towards York, with TransPennine Express providing four round-trips daily, from Manchester Piccadilly to York via Huddersfield, Wakefield Kirkgate and Castleford.

The Glasshoughton area of the town is served by its own railway station, which is situated one stop beyond Castleford on the Pontefract line.

=== Buses ===
In 2016, a new £6 million bus station was opened adjacent to the railway station to allow an integrated travel site for the 12,000 people using the bus station per day.

Local services are provided primarily by Arriva Yorkshire, but also by Globe Holidays (Barnsley) and Ross Travel. Routes link Castleford with Leeds, Pontefract and Wakefield.

== Education ==
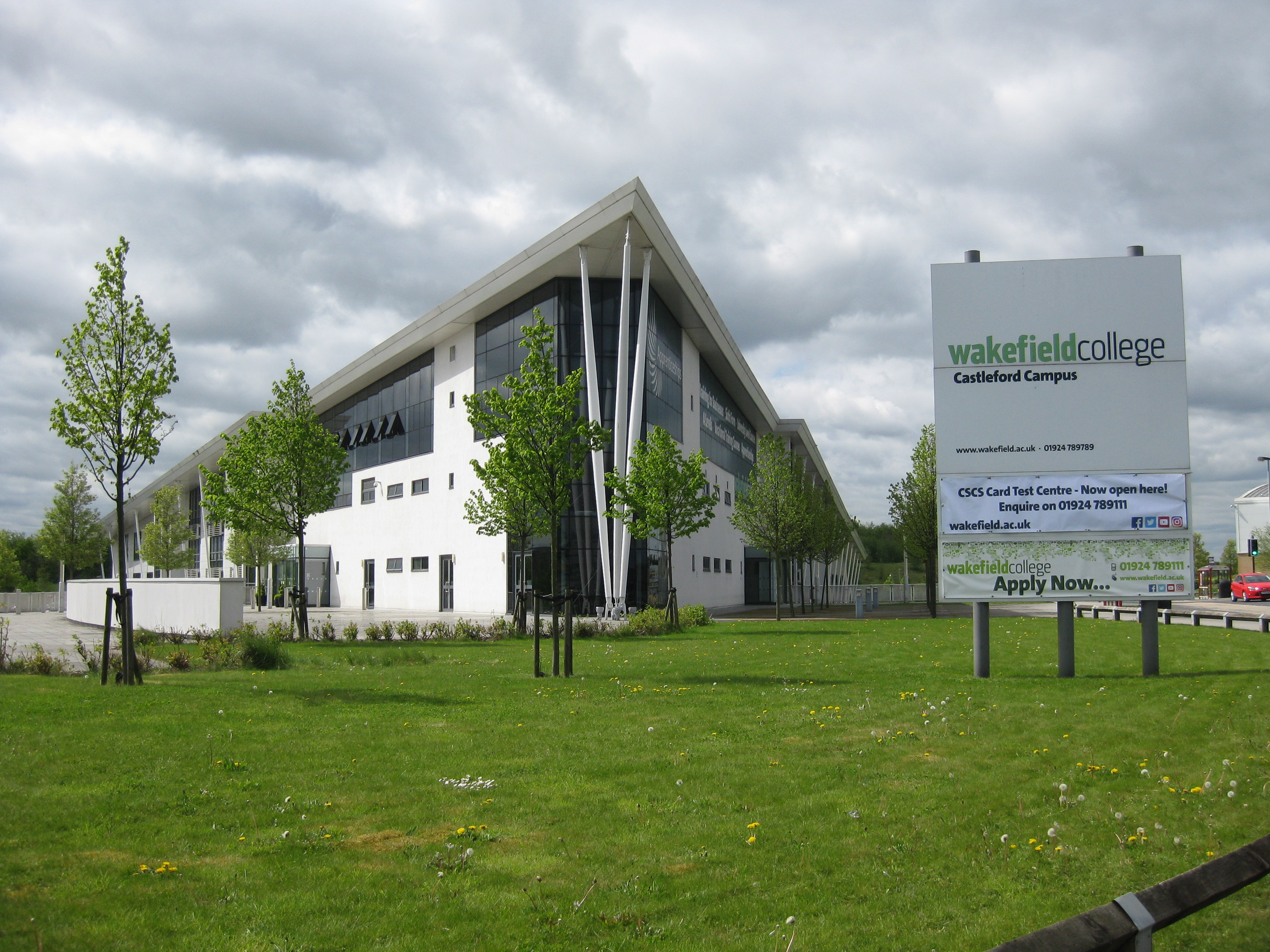
Wakefield College, Castleford Campus, as it was in 2017

The town's primary schools are Wheldon Infant School, Castleford Park Junior, Smawthorne Henry Moore, Townville Infant School, Airedale Juniors, Oyster Park Primary, Fairburn View Primary, Three Lane Ends Academy, Ackton Pastures, Saint Joseph's Catholic Primary and Half Acres.

Castleford's secondary schools for children aged 11–16 are Castleford Academy and Airedale Academy.

The town has a small further and higher education college in Glasshoughton which was originally the Castleford campus of Wakefield College. Rebuilt in 2009, it is now known as Castleford College, one of three separate institutions within the Heart of Yorkshire Education Group along with Wakefield College and Selby College.

== Sport ==
=== Rugby League ===
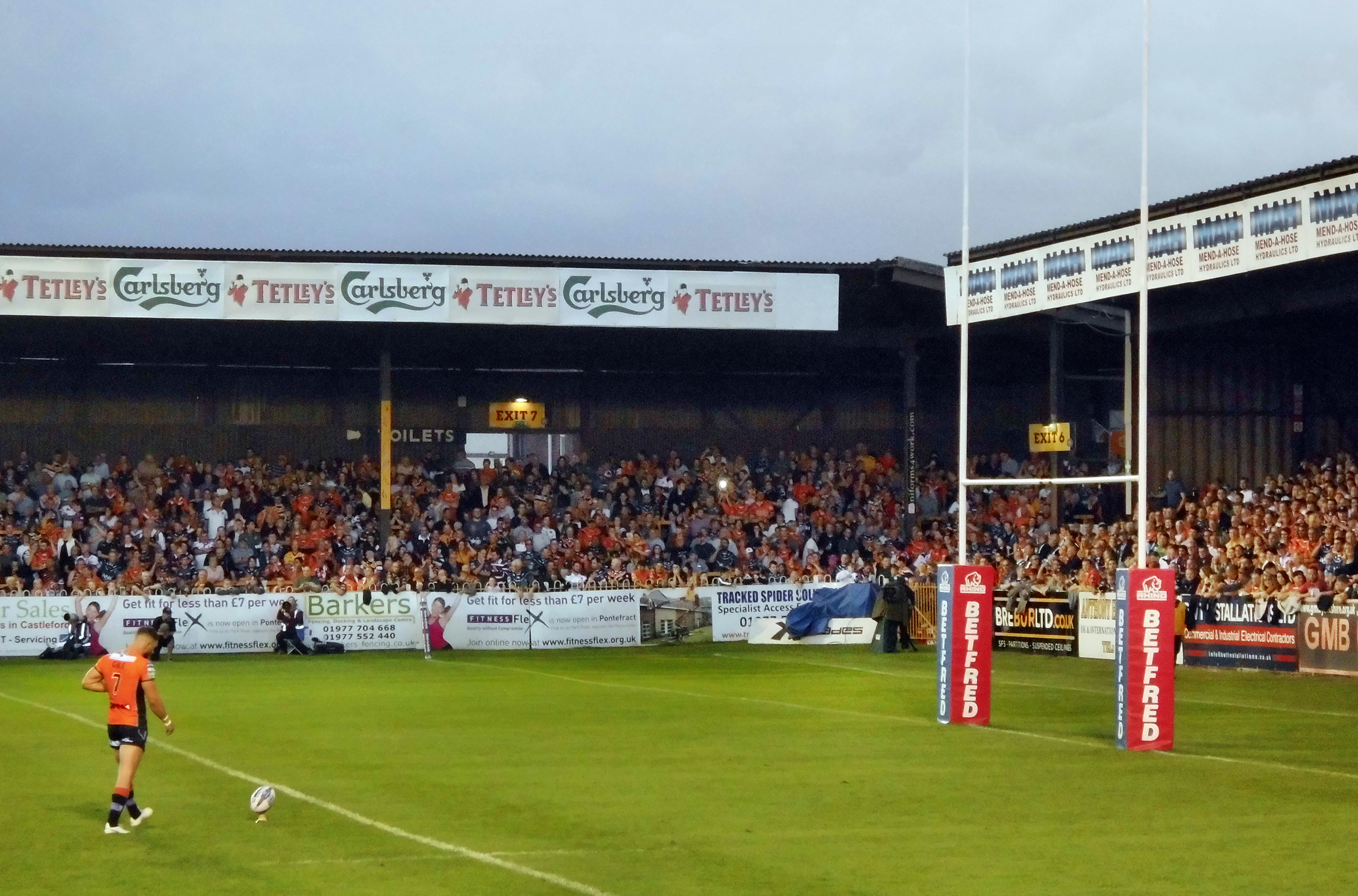
Wheldon Road

Castleford has multiple rugby league teams. The local team, Castleford Tigers was formed in 1926, Castleford was one of the twelve founder members of Super League when the new league format was introduced in 1996. The 'Tigers' nickname and logo were introduced in 1992 and the club's honours include four Challenge Cup and one Super League Leaders Shield.

The club have been based at Wheldon Road since 1927. Castleford also has two other lower league rugby league teams, Castleford Lock Lane and Castleford Panthers. Both Lock Lane and the Panthers play in the fourth tier of British Rugby League, meanwhile Castleford Tigers have play in the top tier of British Rugby League. Castleford Tigers have played majority of their Rugby League in the top tier and have done since their promotion in 2008, to present day.

Rugby league in the town was originally represented by Castleford, unrelated to Castleford RUFC, who did not participate in The schism in English rugby and still exist, nor were they predecessors of the current Castleford Tigers who were founded in 1926. The original Castleford rugby league club played in the Northern Union (Rugby Football League) from 1896–97 to 1905–06, and it had one player named Isaac Cole who won a cap for England in 1906 against Other Nationalities.

=== Motorcycle sport ===
From June 1979 to July 1980, Castleford had its own Speedway racing team, The Kings, based at the Castleford Whitwood Stadium. The circuit was 202 yards and the team never entered the league – only challenge matches were staged.

In the 1960s, motorcycle scrambling used to take place on the north side of the hill at Queens Park. This was often featured on the BBC's Grandstand sports programme on Saturday afternoons and was commentated upon by Murray Walker.

=== Football ===
Glasshoughton Welfare play in the Northern Counties East League, Fryston Colliery Welfare were members of this league until they left in 1991 due to ground grading problems. In the 1920s Castleford Town played in the Midland League alongside clubs such as Doncaster Rovers, Chesterfield, Scunthorpe United, Halifax Town, Leeds United (for 1919–20 season only), Lincoln City and Mansfield Town. This league also contained the reserve sides of Sheffield Wednesday, Barnsley, Nottingham Forest, Grimsby Town and Hull City. In 1920 Castleford reached the 2nd round of the FA Cup, losing 2–3 at Bradford Park Avenue. Castleford played at Wheldon Road – when they shut down the ground was taken over by the rugby league team.

=== Greyhound racing ===
Castleford hosted two greyhound tracks both of which are no longer in existence. The first was in Whitwood and held racing from 1939 until 2001. The second track was the slightly larger 1,500 capacity Castleford Sports Stadium located east of Lock Lane sitting on the north bank of the River Aire.

== Notable people ==
People born in Castleford:

- Paul J. Anderson (born 1971), rugby footballer
- Mark Aston (born 1967), rugby coach
- Arthur "Bruss" Atkinson (1906–1963), rugby footballer
- Dennis Baddeley (1921–2006), rugby footballer
- Mark D. Bailey (born 1960), professor
- George W. Banks (c.1909–????), rugby footballer
- John Beaman (born 1951), politician
- Ben Blackmore (born 1993), rugby footballer
- Peter Broughton (born 1935), cricketer
- Sonia Burgess (1947–2010), immigration lawyer
- Mark Burns-Williamson (born 1964), politician
- Wilf Burrows (1902–1985), footballer
- Abi Burton (born 2000), rugby player
- Harold "Harry" Burton (died 2009), rugby footballer
- Mark Byford (born 1958), deputy director-general of BBC
- Fred Carter, rugby footballer
- James "Sticks" Clare (born 1991), rugby footballer
- Daryl Clark (born 1993), rugby footballer
- Gary Cooper (1938–2019), rugby footballer
- Matt Crowther (born 1974), rugby footballer
- Will Dagger (born 1999), rugby footballer
- Jonathan Davies (born 1991), rugby footballer
- Angus Dunnington (born 1967), International chess master (IM), poker player and author
- Les Dyl (1952–2022), rugby footballer
- Cecil Eastwood (1894–1968), footballer
- Greg Eden (born 1990), rugby footballer
- Derek Edwards (c.1943–2020), rugby footballer
- Brett Ferres (born 1986), rugby footballer
- Richard Foulkes (born 1909), footballer
- Tommy Gale (1895–1976), footballer
- Sammy Gledhill (1913–1994), footballer
- John A. Harman (born 1950), politician
- Jack Hebden (born 1900), footballer
- Jonny Hepworth (born 1989), rugby footballer
- Keith Hepworth (1942–2024), rugby footballer
- Gary Hetherington (born 1954), rugby footballer
- Thomas Holmes (born 1996), rugby footballer
- John Illingworth (1904–1964), footballer
- Gill Isles (born 1972), TV producer
- Neil James (1961–2014), rugby footballer
- Kryan Johnson (born 1994), rugby footballer
- John Kear (1954–2026), rugby coach
- Stan Kielty (1925–2008), rugby footballer
- Brad Knowles (born 1993), rugby footballer
- Shaun Le Roux (born 1986), squash player
- Christopher "Cliff" Lethbridge (1961–2025), cricketer
- Joyce Lishman (1947–2021), professor
- Walter "Ginger" Lynch (1896 – c.1923), footballer
- Dominic Maloney (born 1987), rugby footballer
- Lester Marshall (1902–1956), footballer
- Nathan Massey (born 1989), rugby footballer
- Peter Meakin (born 1942), journalist
- Roger Millward (1947–2016), rugby footballer
- Henry Moore (1898–1986), artist
- Viv Nicholson (1936–2015), pools winner
- Julian Norton (born 1972), veterinary surgeon
- Steve Norton (born 1951), rugby player
- Danny Orr (born 1978), rugby coach
- Stephen Payne (born 1975), footballer
- Daryl Peach (born 1972), pool player
- Mervyn Pike (1918–2004), politician
- Harry Poole (1935–1977), rugby footballer
- Gary "Slogger" Price (born 1961), rugby footballer
- Greta Rana (1943–2023), poet & writer
- Colin Roberts (1933–2017), footballer
- Donald Robinson (1932–2017), rugby footballer
- Ash Robson (born 1995), rugby footballer
- Nicky Saxton (born 1984), rugby footballer
- Waen Shepherd (born 1971), composer
- Chris Smith (born 1975), rugby footballer
- Harry W. Smith (1886–1955), cricketer
- Tony "Casper" Smith (born 1970), rugby player
- Reginald Soar (1893–1971), flying ace
- Anthony Starks (1873–1952), rugby footballer
- Gary Stephens (born 1952), rugby footballer
- Harry Street (1927–2002), rugby footballer
- Tom Sykes (born 1992), darts player
- Gay Taylor (1896–1970), writer
- John "Jack" Taylor (1877–1951), rugby player
- Bob Tomlinson, footballer
- Andrew Townsley (born 1952), cricketer
- David Treasure (born 1950), rugby footballer
- Calum Turner (born 1997), rugby footballer
- John "Willie" Ward (1873–1939), rugby footballer
- John "Johnny" Ward (1940/41–2019), rugby footballer
- Liam Watts (born 1990), rugby footballer
- Noel Wilders (born 1975), boxer
- Kyle Wood (born 1989), rugby footballer
- Val Wood, author
- Martyn Woolford (born 1985), footballer

== See also ==
- Listed buildings in Castleford
- List of places of worship in the City of Wakefield#Castleford
- Trinity Methodist Church, Castleford
