= Ferry Fryston =

Suburb of Castleford, West Yorkshire, England

Coordinates: 53.726°N 1.311°W

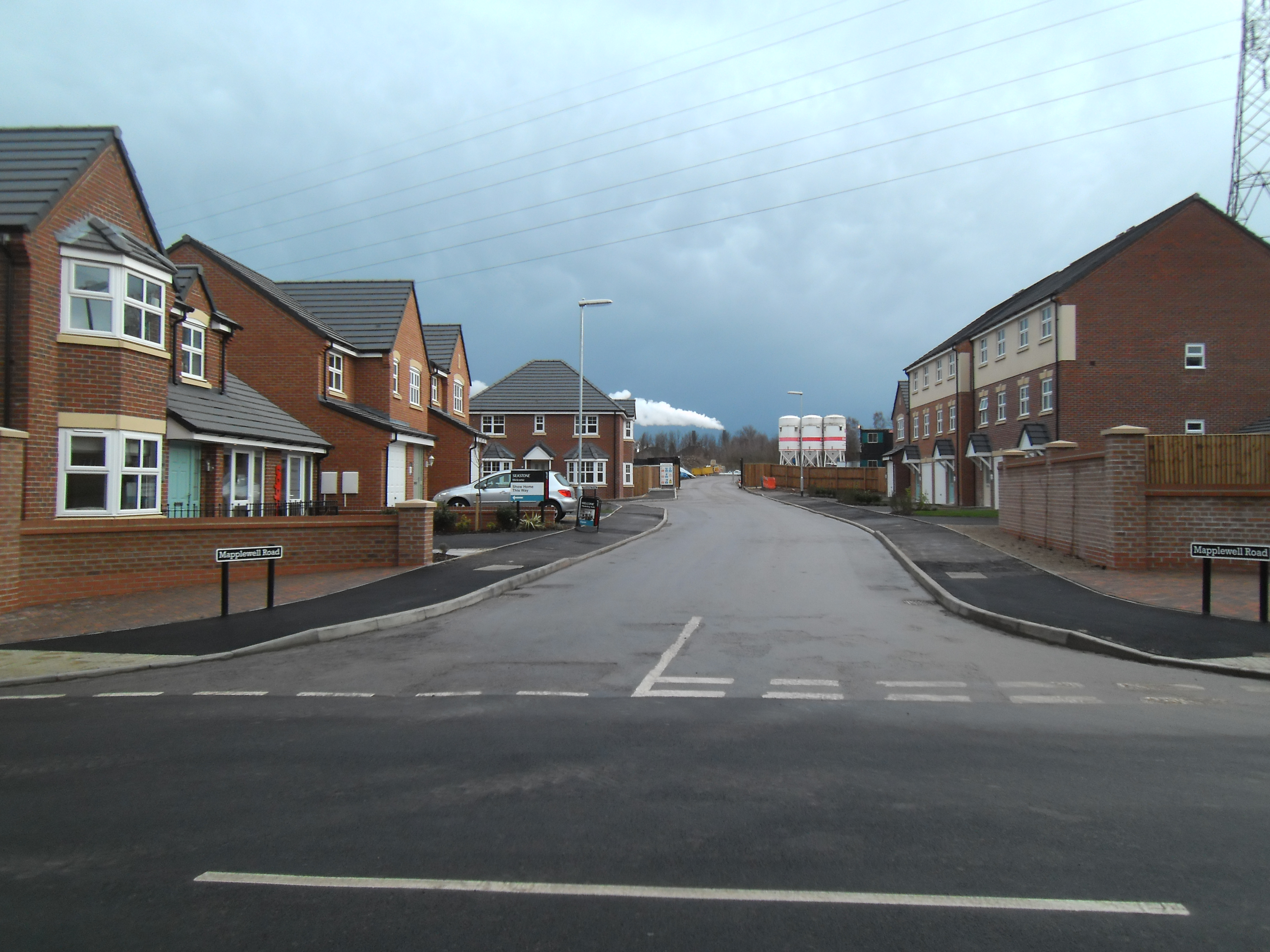

- Location within West Yorkshire
- Metropolitan borough: Wakefield
- Metropolitan county: West Yorkshire
- Region: Yorkshire and the Humber
- Country: England
- Sovereign state: United Kingdom
- Police: West Yorkshire
- Fire: West Yorkshire
- Ambulance: Yorkshire

Ferry Fryston is a suburb of the town of Castleford, in the City of Wakefield district, of West Yorkshire, England. The appropriate ward is called Airedale and Ferry Fryston.

Ferry Fryston was an ancient parish in the wapentake of Osgoldcross in the West Riding of Yorkshire. Until the 19th century the parish surrounded 48 small detached parts (mostly field strips) of the parish of Pontefract. The parish also included the hamlets of Water Frystone, Wheldale, and Ferrybridge. The parish became a civil parish in 1866. The civil parish was abolished on 1 April 1938. Most of the civil parish was absorbed into the civil parishes of Castleford and Knottingley, with smaller areas going to the civil parishes of Pontefract and Fairburn. In 1931 the parish had a population of 7,166.

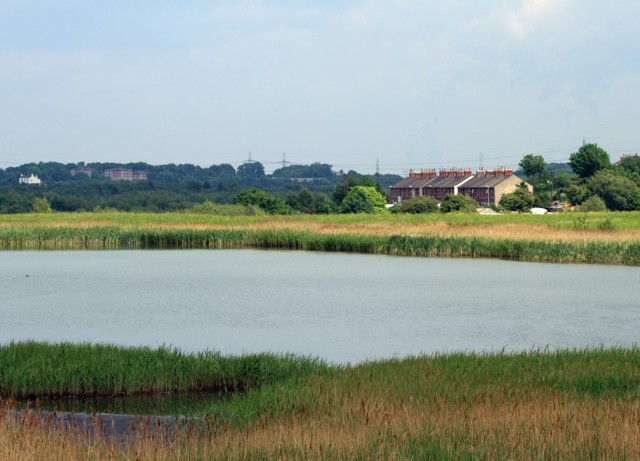
Land reclaimed for a nature reserve and houses in Fryston

Coal mines existed within the boundaries of the former parish in New Fryston, locally known as Fryston Pit, and in Wheldale. The former closed in 1985. The area where the mine once stood has now been re-developed. Wakefield Metropolitan District Council approved plans in November 2007 for 150 new dwellings, parkland and public open space. The dwellings have still yet to be built. Wheldale colliery closed in 1987. Its buildings above ground have been demolished. The areas of both collieries have been subject to land remediation work.

Most homes in the area were homes of local miners. Local authority housing was transferred in 2005 to a charitable community benefit organisation, Wakefield District Housing.
