= Castleford Town F.C. =

English football club

Castleford Town
- Founded: 1907
- Dissolved: 1936
- Ground: Castleford Sports Stadium; Wheldon Road
Home colours

Castleford Town F.C. was an English football club based in Castleford, West Yorkshire.

== History ==
The team played at Castleford Sports Stadium in 1907 and participated in the FA Cup for the first time in 1907–08, but were defeated by Worksop Town in the fourth qualifying round. In 1909 they joined the Midland League. In 1911–12, Castleford reached the 5th qualifying round (now the modern day 1st round proper), losing to Reading from the Southern League, 2–1. In 1919–20 they reached the second round (now the 4th round proper) of the FA Cup, where they lost 3–2 to Bradford (Park Avenue)

When the Football League created the Third Division North in 1921 Castleford applied to join. Fourteen clubs were admitted without a vote, whilst another fourteen (including Castleford) faced a ballot for the four remaining places. Castleford received 18 votes, finishing fifth and failing in their attempt. The club did not apply again. Castleford finished 8th in the Midland League in 1913–14, 1919–20 and 1920–21; and in 1921-22 they finished 7th. Other clubs in the Midland League during this era included Chesterfield, Rotherham County, Doncaster Rovers, Grimsby Town, Lincoln City, Scunthorpe & Lindsey United, Halifax Town, Leeds United, Mansfield Town and York City.

In 1926 they switched to the Yorkshire League, as the extra expenses from the Midland League expanding to the south were proving difficult for the club to meet, and finished as runners-up in their first season in the league. After finishing third in their second season in the league, they left at the end of their third. Castleford Town played at Wheldon Road, before Castleford Tigers took over the ground.

In 1934 they rejoined the league playing at Castleford Sports Stadium again, but left again after two seasons.

== Colours ==
The club's colours were blue and white striped shirts and black shorts.
