= List of places of worship in the City of Wakefield =

This article lists open, former and demolished places of worship situated within the boundaries of the City of Wakefield.

== Open places of worship ==
=== Ackworth ===
| Name | Image | Location | Denomination | Grade | Opened | Notes |
|---|---|---|---|---|---|---|
| All Saints' Church | | Ackworth Moor Top | Church of England | | | |
| Ackworth Methodist Church | | Barnsley Road; WF7 7NB | Methodist | | 1859 and 1913 | The 1859 building was severely damaged by fire in 1912 and had to be reconstructed the following year. |
| St Cuthbert's Church | | Ackworth | Church of England | II* | | |

=== Badsworth ===
| Name | Image | Location | Denomination | Grade | Opened | Notes |
|---|---|---|---|---|---|---|
| St Mary's Church | | Badsworth | Church of England | I | | |

=== Castleford ===
| Name | Image | Location | Denomination | Grade | Opened | Notes |
|---|---|---|---|---|---|---|
| All Saints' Church (Castleford town centre) | | Albion Street, Castleford town centre | Church of England | II | | |
| All Saints' Church (Hightown) | | Hightown | Church of England | | | |
| Cutsyke Christian Church | | Leeds Road, Cutsyke, Castleford WF10 5HA | | | | |
| Gospel Hall | | Pontefract Road | Gospel | | | Formerly Pontefract Road Primitive Methodist Church |
| Holy Cross Church | | Airedale | Church of England | | | Serves the Airedale estate |
| St Edmund's Church | | Queens Park Drive, Airedale | Roman Catholic | | | Serves the Airedale estate |
| St Joseph's Church | | Pontefract Road | Roman Catholic | | | |
| St Michael's Church | | Smawthorne Lane | Church of England | | | |
| St Paul the Apostle | | Pontefract Road, Glasshoughton | Church of England | | | |
| Smawthorne Community Church | | Beancroft Road | Evangelical | | | |
| Trinity Methodist Church | | Powell Street, Castleford town centre | Methodist | | 1964 | |
| Townville Methodist Church | | Townville | Methodist | | | |

=== Featherstone ===
| Name | Image | Location | Denomination | Grade | Opened | Notes |
|---|---|---|---|---|---|---|
| Featherstone Methodist Church | | Featherstone | Methodist | | | |
| St Gerald Majella | | Featherstone | Roman Catholic | | | |
| St Thomas | | Featherstone | Church of England | | | |
| South Featherstone Gospel Hall | | Station Lane, Featherstone | | | | |

=== Horbury ===
For details of current and former places of worship in Horbury, see Horbury#Religion

=== Knottingley ===
| Name | Image | Location | Denomination | Grade | Opened | Notes |
|---|---|---|---|---|---|---|
| Christ Church East Knottingley | | | Church of England | | | Parish formed from Pontefract in 1846. United with St. Botolph's Parish (see below) in 1941. |
| Elim Pentecostal Church | | Tithe Barn Road | Pentecostal | | | |
| Knottingley United Reformed Church | | Knottingley | United Reformed Church | | | |
| Salvation Army Church | | Weeland Road | Salvation Army | | | |
| St Botolph's Church | | Knottingley | Church of England | II | | |

=== Normanton ===
| Name | Image | Location | Denomination | Grade | Opened | Notes |
|---|---|---|---|---|---|---|
| All Saints' Church | | High Street; Normanton; WF6 1NT | Anglican | | | |
| Normanton Methodist Church | | Wakefield Road; Normanton; WF6 1AG | Methodist | | | Part of the Aire and Calder Methodist Circuit. |
| St John the Baptist | | Newland Lane; Normanton; WF6 1BA | Roman Catholic | | | The land where the church is built was formerly owned by the Knights of St John of Jerusalem. |

=== Ossett ===
| Name | Image | Location | Denomination | Grade | Opened | Notes |
|---|---|---|---|---|---|---|
| Christ Church | | Ossett | Church of England | II | 1851 | Commissioners' church |
| Holy Trinity Church | | Ossett | Church of England | II | | |
| The King's Way Church | | Ossett | Methodist | | | |
| Mount Zion Chapel | | Queen Street | Methodist | | | |
| St Ignatius | | Storrs Hill Road | Roman Catholic | | | |
| South Ossett Baptist Church | | Junction Lane | Baptist | | | |

=== Pontefract ===
| Name | Image | Location | Denomination | Grade | Opened | Notes |
|---|---|---|---|---|---|---|
| All Saints' Church | | North Bailey Gate, Pontefact | Church of England | II* | | The outer church was destroyed in the English Civil War, a new church was built within having been completed in 1967 |
| Central Methodist Church | | Jubilee Way, Pontefract | Methodist | | | |
| Pontefract Congregational Church | | Finkle Street, Pontefract | Congregational | | | |
| The Evangelical Church | | Finkle Street, Pontefract | Evangelical | | | |
| Holy Family Church | | Carleton Crest, Chequerfield Estate, Pontefract | Roman Catholic | | | |
| Kingdom Hall of the Jehovah's Witnesses | | Orchard Head Lane | Jehovah's Witnesses | | | |
| Chapel of The Church of Jesus Christ of Latter-day Saints | | Park Villas Drive, Pontefract | Latter-day Saints | | | |
| Micklegate Methodist Church | | Micklegate, Pontefract | Methodist | | 1969 | This replaced the former Tanshelf Methodist Church which burned down in 1965 |
| Salvation Army Hall | | Maud's Yard, Pontefract | Salvation Army | | | |
| St Giles' Church | | Market Place, Pontefract | Church of England | II* | | |
| St Joseph's Church | | Back Street, Pontefract | Roman Catholic | | | |

=== Upton ===
| Name | Image | Location | Denomination | Grade | Opened | Notes |
|---|---|---|---|---|---|---|
| Upton Methodist Church | | High Street, Upton. | Methodist | | | |

=== Wakefield ===
| Name | Image | Location | Denomination | Grade | Opened | Notes |
|---|---|---|---|---|---|---|
| Wakefield Cathedral (Cathedral Church of All Saints') | | Kirkgate, Wakefield City Centre | Church of England | I | | |
| Destiny Church | | Chaloner Grove | | II | 1859 | A former theatre |
| Evangelical Free Church | | Eastmoor | Evangelical | | | |
| First Church of Christ Scientist | | Wentworth Street | First Church of Christ Scientist | | | |
| Church of Jesus Christ and the Latter Day Saints | | Horbury Road | Mormon | | | |
| Light ^ Life Church | | Clarion Street, Belle Vue | Non-denominational | | | |
| New Life Christian Centre | | George Street | Pentecostal | II | | |
| Outwood Methodist Church | | Outwood | Methodist | | | |
| Quaker Meeting House | | Thornhill Street, Wakefield City Centre | Quaker | | | |
| St Andrew's Church | | Peterson Road, Wakefield | Church of England | II | | Serves the East end of Wakefield and Eastmoor |
| St Anne's Church | | Wrenthorpe | Church of England | | | Serves the Wrenthorpe district |
| St Austin's Church | | Wentworth Terrace | Roman Catholic | II | | Serves North Wakefield |
| St Catherine's Church | | Doncaster Road | Church of England | | | |
| St George's Church | | St George's Road, Lupset | Church of England | | | |
| St Helen's Church | | Sandal Magna | Church of England | II* | | Serves the Sandal district |
| St James Church | | Denby Dale Road, Thornes | Church of England | II | | |
| St John's Church | | St John's Square, Wakefield City Centre | Church of England | II* | 1895 | Serves the areas to the north of Wakefield City Centre |
| Chantry Chapel of St Mary the Virgin | | Wakefield Bridge, Wakefield City Centre | Church of England | I | c. 1350 | Forms part of the structure of Wakefield Bridge |
| St Mary Magdalene's Church | | Outwood; WF1 2DT | Church of England | | 1858 | Part of the benefice of North Wakefield |
| St Michael's Church | | Westgate End, Wakefield | Church of England | | | Serves the west end of Wakefield |
| St Paul's Church | | St Paul's Drive, Alverthorpe, Wakefield | Church of England | II | | Serves Alverthorpe |
| St Peter and St Paul Church | | Standbridge Lane | Roman Catholic | | | Serves South Wakefield |
| Sandal Methodist Church | | Sandal Magna | Methodist | | | |
| Trinity Methodist Church | | Stanley Road | Methodist | | | Serves North Wakefield |
| Wakefield Baptist Church | | Barnsley Road | Baptist | | | |
| Wakefield Citadel | | Frederick Street, Wakefield City Centre | Salvation Army | | | |
| Wakefield Spiritualist Church | | Peterston Road, Wakefield | Spiritualist | | | |
| Westgate Unitarian Chapel | | Westgate, Wakefield City Centre | Unitarian | | | |
| West Wakefield Methodist Church | | Thornes Road, Wakefield | Methodist | | | |

== Former places of worship ==
=== Featherstone ===
- North Featherstone Gospel Hall (closed)

=== West Bretton ===
| Name | Image | Location | Denomination | Grade | Opened | Notes |
|---|---|---|---|---|---|---|
| St Bartholomew's Chapel | | Yorkshire Sculpture Park, WF4 4LG | Church of England | | | Now used for art and sculpture display purposes and known as YSP Chapel |

== See also ==
- List of places of worship in the City of Leeds
