= Len Scott =

New Zealand international rugby league player

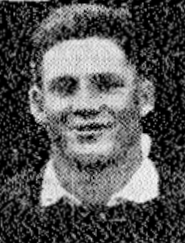

Personal information
- Full name: Leonard Joseph Scott
- Born: 25 February 1907 Birkenhead, Auckland, New Zealand
- Died: 4 June 1986 (aged 79) Devonport, Auckland, New Zealand

Playing information
- Position: Wing
Club
Years	Team	Pld	T	G	FG	P
1926–40	Devonport United/North Shore Albions	137	104	2	0	316
1931	Devonport-Marist	1	1	0	0	3
	Total	138	105	2	0	319
Representative
Years	Team	Pld	T	G	FG	P
1926–36	Auckland	9	7	0	0	21
1926–31	Auckland Colts	2	0	0	0	0
1928–36	New Zealand Trial	2	0	0	0	0
1928–36	New Zealand	5	3	0	0	9
1928	Auckland Province	1	1	0	0	3
1928	New Zealand XIII	1	1	0	0	3
1929–32	North Island	2	3	0	0	9
- Relatives: Verdun Scott (cousin), Alf Scott (cousin)

Leonard Joseph Scott (25 February 1907 – 4 June 1986) was a rugby league player. He represented the New Zealand rugby league team in 5 tests between 1928 and 1936, becoming the 191st player to represent New Zealand. Scott also played for the North Shore Albions club based in Devonport on Auckland's North Shore. Scott also played representative matches for Auckland, Auckland Colts, Auckland Province, New Zealand trial sides, a New Zealand XIII, and the North Island. He is the cousin of New Zealand rugby league player and New Zealand test cricketer, Verdun Scott and the two played together at North Shore later in Len's career.

== Early life ==
Len was born in Birkenhead on 25 February 1907 to Joseph and Catherine (Kate) Scott. Len was the oldest child of Catherine and Joseph though he did have older step brothers after his father remarried (James, Arthur, and Denis), and an older step sister (Mary). Len's full siblings were Raymond Henry (b. 1909-87), Kenneth Gordon (b. 1910-88), John (Jack) Colin (b. 1913-95), and Vincent Laurence (b. 1916-91). Catherine died on 23 December 1916, ten days after giving birth to Vincent while the family lived at 31 Vauxhall Road, Devonport aged just 35. She had been "confined" on the day of the birth of Vincent and complained of being ill on the day of her death but died just before Dr. Atkinson, who had been summoned, could arrive. The doctor gave evidence that the death was "due to a cerebral embolism" which was in accordance with the coroners verdict.

Len's father Joseph was a carter who worked in the Devonport suburb. He died of influenza during the epidemic of 1918 on 8 November, aged 45. This of course left all the children orphaned. Mary, the eldest sister had wanted to take care of the children but was only aged 16 at the time. Instead the family spent time with their cousins who also lived in Devonport and at a local orphanage.

== Playing career ==
=== Devonport United (North Shore Albions) ===
Len Scott made his senior debut on the wing for Devonport United in the first match of the season on 24 April 1926 when aged 19. He played alongside Allan Seagar who was at centre. His cousin Alfred (Alf) Henry Scott was playing in the forwards. Another cousin, Matthew Scott, Alf's brother, had retired the season prior. The match was played at Carlaw Park before a crowd of 7,000 and saw Devonport lose to Ponsonby United 31-21. The New Zealand Herald said following the match that "a wing who impressed was L. Scott, a promoted junior. He has plenty of pace and handles the ball well. K. Scott is another dashing player, but had few opportunities". The "K. Scott" had transferred to the Devonport club in 1925 from the Kiwi club in Melbourne and it is unknown if he was related. It is highly unlikely that it was his younger brother Kenneth as he was just 15 years of age. The following week he played against Richmond Rovers, and then in round 3 against Marist Old Boys. He scored his first and second tries in first grade in a 19-15 loss in this match. The first came when he took a pass from cousin Alf and "he had speed on and ran down to score near the corner". He nearly scored again a while later but was "thrown out with only a few yards to go", however shortly afterwards in a passing movement he received the ball and "dashed over the line". He later saved a try, preventing John Stormont from scoring. Then with the score 19-13 to Marist late in the match he secured the ball and "passed to Douglas, who dived over" to narrow the score before the end of the match. The Auckland Star said that "L. Scott and K. Scott were the best of Devonport's backs" while the Herald said Len "has lots of pace and uses it to good advantage". Scott scored a try in a 13-6 loss to Grafton Athletic on 15 May at the Devonport Domain, and then 2 more tries in a 14-5 win over City Rovers on 5 June. Then in round 7 at the Devonport Domain he scored a remarkable 5 tries in a 40-14 thrashing of Newton Rangers. By this stage of the season he was the second highest try scorer in the competition with 9, just 1 behind try scoring legend Lou Brown on 10.

He scored another brace of tries in a 19-16 loss to Ponsonby United. Scott's form was so good in his debut season in first grade that there was speculation that he was close to Auckland squad selection. He was named in the reserves for a New Zealand trial match at Carlaw Park on 3 July but was not required to take the field. A week later he replaced Jim Parkes in the A Team in a second New Zealand trial after he was promoted to the Probables side in the other trial match to replace the injured Lou Brown. His A Team was defeated by the B Team 30 points to 28.

Scott then returned to the Devonport side and scored a try in a 24-0 win over Richmond Rovers. His try was set up by his cousin Alf, and later in the match the Auckland Star described some action: "the Scott trinity showed up well for Shore when A. Scott, L. Scott, and K Scott combined well, a family affair that carried play into the Richmond twenty-five" with K Scott scoring soon after. He scored again in a 31-13 win over Marist the following weekend. Unsurprisingly Scott was not selected for the New Zealand side to tour England and Wales. He was picked as a reserve for the Auckland side to play New Zealand prior to their departure. Then in August he was named in the training squad for the Auckland match against Otago. He was not named to play but came on to replace the injured Douglas just before halftime to make his Auckland debut in a 14-4 win in the 7 August match. He used his pace to save a try beating Cameron to the ball and kicking it out. Following a 42-8 win for Devonport over Grafton where he again crossed the try line Scott was named in the squad to play in Auckland's match with Canterbury though was ultimately named in the reserves and was not required to play.

Scott's final 2 appearances for Devonport came in the semi-final win over Marist in the Roope Rooster where he scored a try, and then in the 16-15 Roope Rooster final loss to Richmond on 16 October. He scored a first half try which gave Devonport a lead when his "speed carried him over near the corner". It was said that he and K. Scott were the pick of the three-quarters. He had been named in the Auckland squad for their match with South Auckland (Waikato) on 9 October but was only named in the reserves on match day once more. His final match of his debut season was for an Auckland Colts side against the B Division representative side on 30 October. It was a remarkable season which saw Scott the equal top try scorer in first grade club football with 17 tries, which tied him with G. Wade of City Rovers.

The 1927 season saw Scott as the leading try scorer on his own for senior competitions. He scored 14 tries in 15 matches for Devonport. He scored in the opening game of the season in a win over City when he charged down a kick. The Auckland Star said that the North Shore wings were given few opportunities which was "a pity, as Scott was in brilliant form". He then scored another try in a 12-8 loss against Marist in round 2 before scoring 4 tries in a 47-3 thrashing of Grafton Athletic. He scored in 3 consecutive matches against Ponsonby (R6), Newton (R7), and City (R8) where it was said he "gave a dashing display, and was the best of the three-quarters". Despite Scott's try scoring feats he did not make any of the representative sides for the year. After a try scoring win over Grafton on 23 July the New Zealand Herald remarked in a piece about possible players to be selected for Auckland's southern tour that "Scott and Little are perhaps the speediest three-quarters playing the code, although their football is at times erratic". Then after a match with Ponsonby it was said that he and Hemingway were the weak links with "their failure to keep in position [proving] expensive". It was possibly for these reasons and his young age that he was overlooked for the Auckland rep side.

=== Auckland selection ===
The 1928 season was arguably the most significant of Scott's long career. He scored 19 tries in 16 games for Devonport to once again lead the competition in try scoring. He also played 5 matches for Auckland and another for Auckland Province. It would also see him make his New Zealand debut, along with an appearance for a New Zealand XIII. He scored 2 tries in a round one win over City and a week later 2 more tries in a 12-11 win over Newton. The first came after he "raced on a short diagonal line and dived through a tackle by Hardgrave to score wide out". It was said that he and Saxon, on the other wing were "quick to embrace any chance that came their way". In round 3 he scored 4 tries in Devonport's 31-22 win over Marist. The Herald reported that he "had a regular field day, scoring four tries [and] he could have registered another, as he had all the opposition beaten when he gave Horace Dixon an easy try. Scott displayed great determination in going for the line, an example which some other senior three quarters could very well emulate. There is one weakness about his play, however, and that is on defence. Should he improve in this department of the game, he has the makings of a real champion". He went try-less in a win over Richmond before scoring again against Ponsonby, before scoring 2 more against Ellerslie United. After the Ponsonby match the Auckland Star said that in regards to Auckland selection "one of the wings, L. Scott, on form, must be well in the running".

Scott was indeed named in the Auckland side to play South Auckland (northern Waikato) on 16 June. He was picked on the wing with Craddock Dufty at fullback, Allan Seagar at centre, and Claude List on the other wing. It was said that "Dufty, Gregory, Wetherill, and List were certain of selection, and L. Scott, by reason of sheer achievement has won his place". Auckland won the match 22-3 with Scott scoring a try. "L. Scott and Hardgrave were ideal wings in the three quarter line" while his cousin Alf played well in the forwards. His try came when Dufty chimed in to a back movement and "made an easy try for Scott". The Herald did however say that while he "was good on attack [he] spoiled an otherwise sound game by repeatedly tackling high".

Scott then returned to club football where he scored a try in an 8-6 win over City, and then 3 tries in a 23-16 loss to Newton, before another try in a 14-13 loss to Marist in round 10. His try came after he received the ball "on the right flank, and the winger cut in-field beautifully to outstrip the opposition and score in a handy position". He was then selected in an Auckland trial on 11 July. His Auckland Probables side went down 24-14. The "wing three quarter honours were fairly well divided between Hardgrave, List, and Scott … L. Scott played his usually unobtrusive yet essentially sound game". Then in a match for Devonport he scored a brilliant try against Richmond. He made "dashing runs on the wing [which] stamped him as a most determined player. His try in the second spell would have been scored by very few-if any-threequarters in the game".

Scott was then named in the reserves for the Auckland side to play Canterbury on 21 July but was not required to play. Four days later he was again picked for Auckland, but this time to start in their match with South Auckland at Carlaw Park. He scored 2 tries in a 19-17 loss. He and Hardgrave both played well "and finished off several movements by sheer dash and pace". After the match the North Island representative side to play the South Island was named and Scott was listed in the reserves. The Auckland Star said that Scott "played a splendid game against South Auckland, and it is just a toss-up as to the wisdom of Hardgrave's inclusion before him".

=== New Zealand selection ===
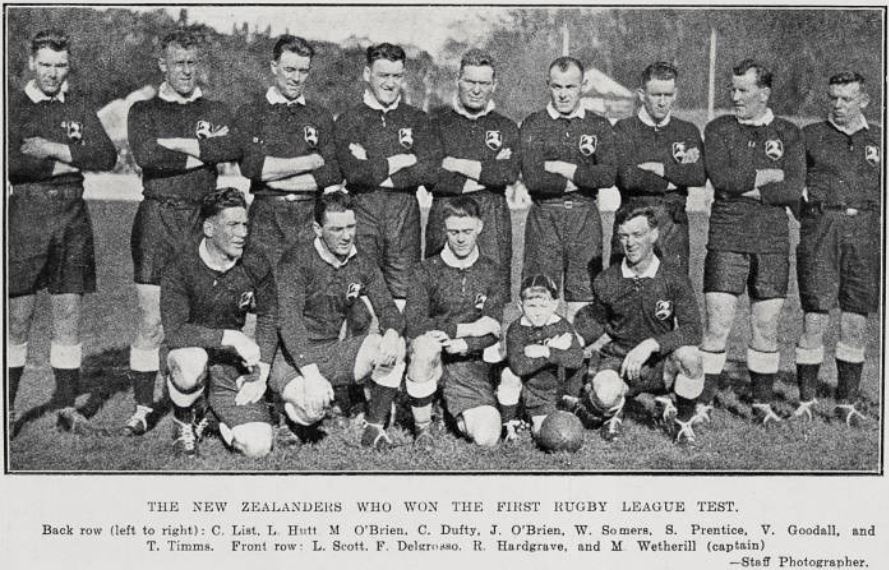
New Zealand team before the first test on 4 August at Carlaw Park.

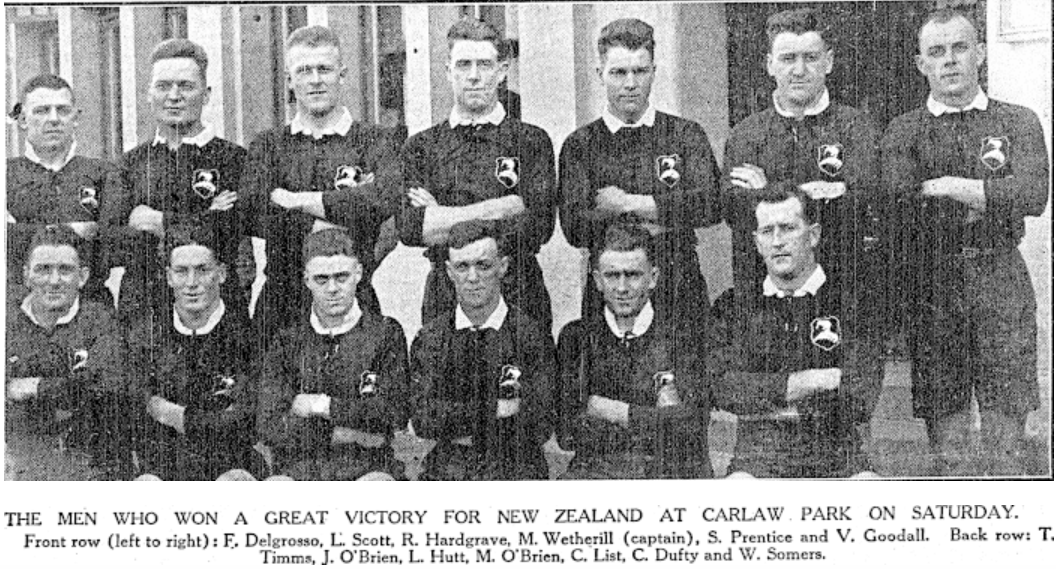

On August Scott played in the New Zealand trial in the NZ Probables side against the NZ Possibles at Carlaw Park. His side won 27-24 and at the conclusion of the match New Zealand selectors Edwin Fox, W. J. Mitchell, and William Murray, selected Scott to play on the wing in his New Zealand debut against the touring England side in the first test. Craddock Dufty was at fullback, with Roy Hardgrave on one wing and Scott on the other. The centre was Claude List, with Maurice Wetherill and Stan Prentice in the five eighths positions, and Frank Delgrosso at halfback. It was an all Auckland backline. The Auckland Star said that "Hardgrave's selection was a foregone conclusion, and in choosing L. Scott, the next best win in New Zealand has been found". The first test was played at Carlaw Park before a crowd of 25,000 on 4 August. Scott was playing opposite Alf Ellaby on the English side. He scored 2 tries in an upset 17-13 win for the New Zealand side. In the first half Claude List punted behind the England backs and Scott "beat Askin and Sullivan in a follow through, but the ball went over the dead line".

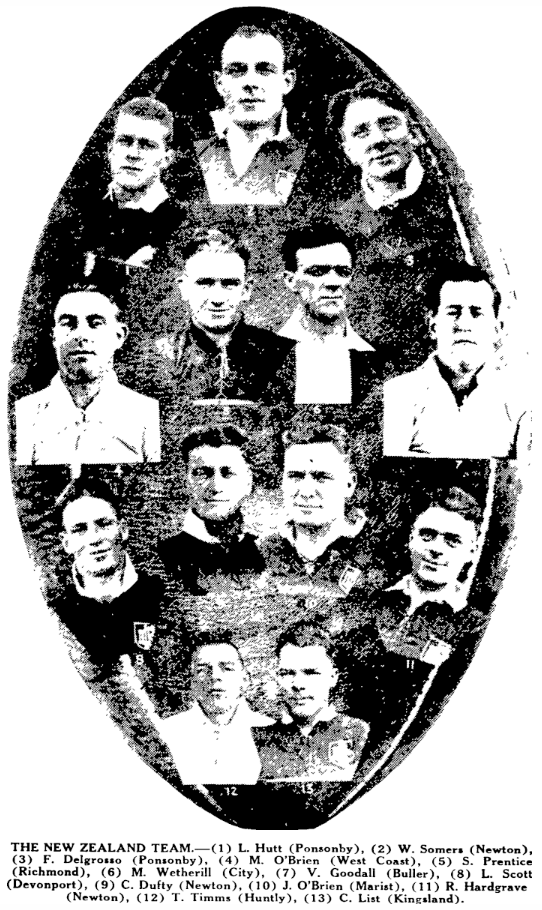

There was some controversy when Scott and all the other backs were off the field and didn't hear the whistle restarting the second half. This left New Zealand with just 6 players on the field before the others quickly rejoined the match. Early in the second half with New Zealand leading 11-3 when Wally Somers hooked a scrum for New Zealand. Frank Delgrosso passed to Maurice Wetherill who was caught flatfooted but "swept a very wide pass to List. The latter raced on a diagonal line and whipped the ball on to Len Scott. Amid a scene of great excitement, Scott tossed back his head and ran for the corner flag. Askin put in a flying low tackle, but the Shore man kept his feet and amid delirious excitement went across wide out". New Zealand was outplaying England and "there was a swirl of play in front of the posts, then it went to the right corner and Scott was cheered to the echo when he fielded the ball and flashed across near the corner flag". England came back with 2 converted tries but New Zealand hung on for an historic win. The Herald said that Scott's "determination when in possession [was] a treat to witness". The Auckland Star in reflecting on the game said that "it has often been said that opportunity makes the man. Take the case of L. Scott, the Devonport wing three-quarter. Right through the season he has shown consistent improvement, and he won a place in the New Zealand test team on his merits. And on the day he played as if he had been in international football for a couple of seasons. That he rose to the occasion so splendidly was a course of great satisfaction to the many who admire his play".

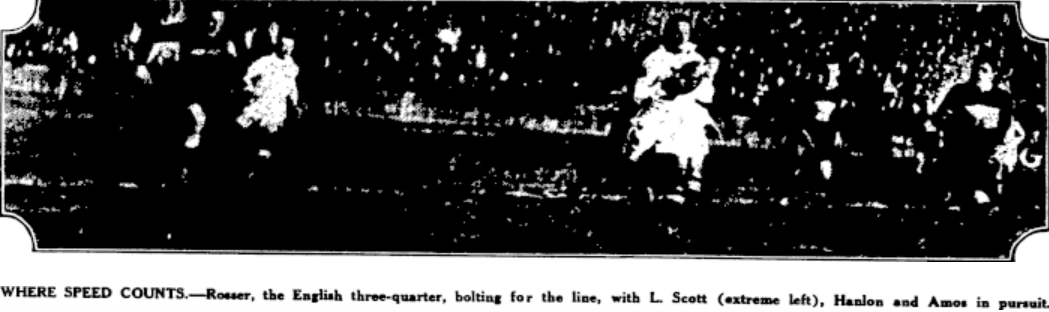

Scott was then chosen in the Auckland Provincial side to play a midweek match against England at Carlaw Park. The Provincial side went down 14-9 before 15,000 spectators. Scott scored a try and "was the most impressive [in the three-quarter line], and has more than justified the chance he has been given in big football". His try came in the first half with Auckland province leading 2-0. Hanlon "cut in nicely. List ran to the fullback and sent Scott over for a fine try".

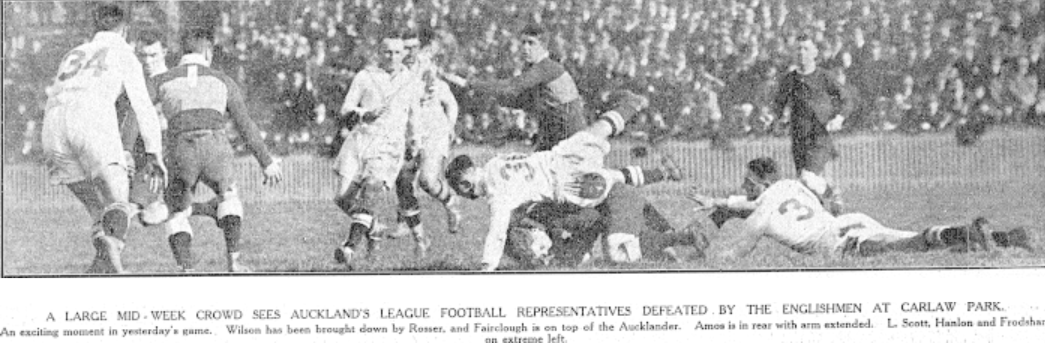

He was then selected to play for Auckland against England on the following Saturday, once more at Carlaw Park. The back line was identical to the one which had played for New Zealand in the first test. Scott had been injured in the midweek game and there was speculation that he might not be able to play. He was however able to play and scored a try in a 26-15 loss. In the first half he saved a try along with Craddock Dufty when they tackled the English forward Joe Thompson just before he could reach the line. In the second half with the score 10-6 in favour of Auckland "Scott following a kick through to beat Fairclough and kick on. A great race ensued, but the Auckland three quarter had too much pace and touched down near the posts". After Dufty converted the score was 15-6 but England dominated the match thereafter to win comfortably.

Scott was then named in the second test side to be played in Dunedin, though in a 4 man three-quarter selection including List, Hardgrave, and Hec Brisbane with one to be omitted. Scott did ultimately play in the test which was to become infamous for the violent play throughout the match. The game was played at the Caledonian ground before a crowd of 9,000. With the score 2-2 in the first half Brisbane "picked up the ball and cleverly evaded his opponents, and passed to Scott, who, although tackled, rolled over and scored". Burgess the English prop was sent off following a scrum incident, though he himself was bleeding from the nose. The Press Association coverage of the match said that "the game was played in a spirit not seen in Dunedin in the memory of the present generation. At times it almost developed into a brawl. The spectators were far from being favourably impressed, and expressed their disgust in no uncertain manner". It was said following the match that "Scott was a slashing player, and made some great sprints down the line".

The teams traveled south to Invercargill to play a midweek exhibition game between a New Zealand XIII and the English side. The New Zealand XIII team won 27-26 thanks to a try at the end of the match to Scott. The try came about after Maurice Wetherill kicked across to the corner, "and Scott, gathering up the ball in great style, scored the winning try". The third test side for Christchurch was named with Scott once more on the wing. The back line was the same as the previous test with the exception of Tim Peckham who had come on to replace the injured Frank Delgrosso who had gone off injured in the second test.

The third test was relatively uneventful compared to the second, with England winning the match and the series with a 6-5 win. The test was played at English Park, home of the football association after they were refused the use of Lancaster Park.

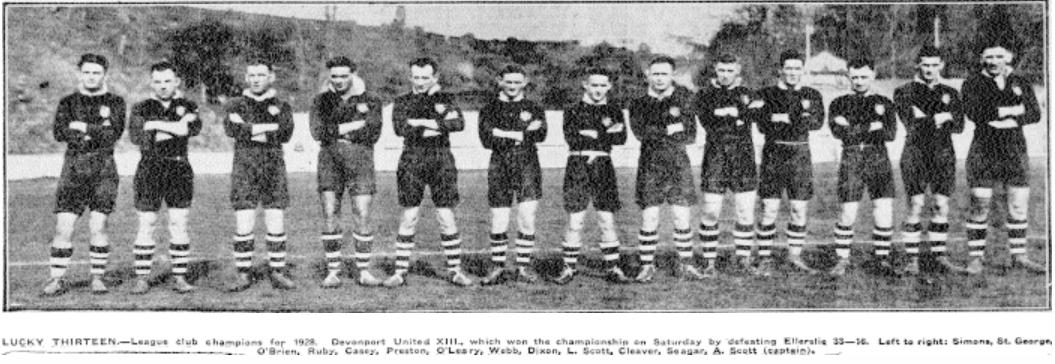

Following the third test Scott went back to club football with Devonport. He played 5 more matches, the first was the final round robin match against Ellerslie. A 33-16 win saw Devonport secure the first grade championship for the third time in their history after previous wins in 1913 and 1914. Scott scored 2 tries in the win, with the first coming early in the match when he kicked a loose ball through and scored by the posts, then later he got on the end of a passing movement and "on the right wing, the New Zealand representative showed pace and going across at the flag before the defence could converge". His remaining matches were in a Roope Rooster win over Ellerslie, a semi final loss to Marist, and then the Stormont Shield final loss to the same opponent.

Scott also played 2 further matches for Auckland. The first was in a 42-22 win over Otago. He scored a try after receiving the ball in the open field and easily ran the last 50 years to score between the posts. He played again for Auckland on 6 October against North Auckland at Kensington Park in Whangārei. Auckland won the match comfortably by 33 points to 9.

=== 1929 Devonport, Auckland, and North Island ===
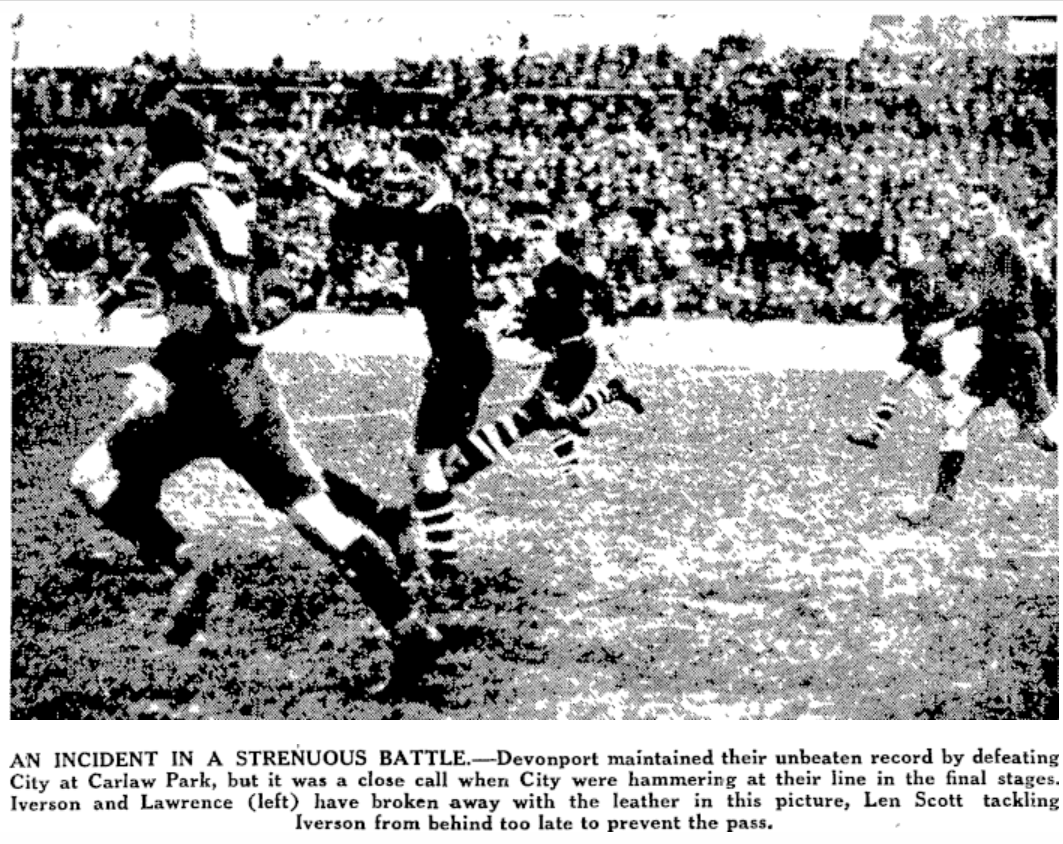

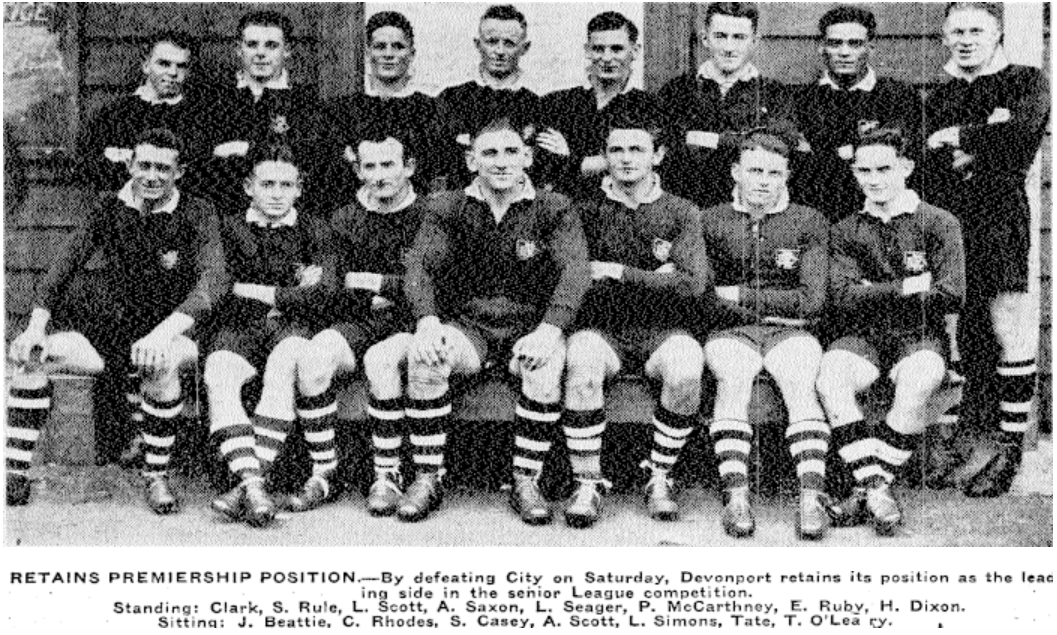

Scott played 17 matches for Devonport in 1929, scoring 11 tries. In their round 1 win over Ponsonby "L. Scott, the Shore greyhound accepted a beautifully timed pass and sailed across wide out".

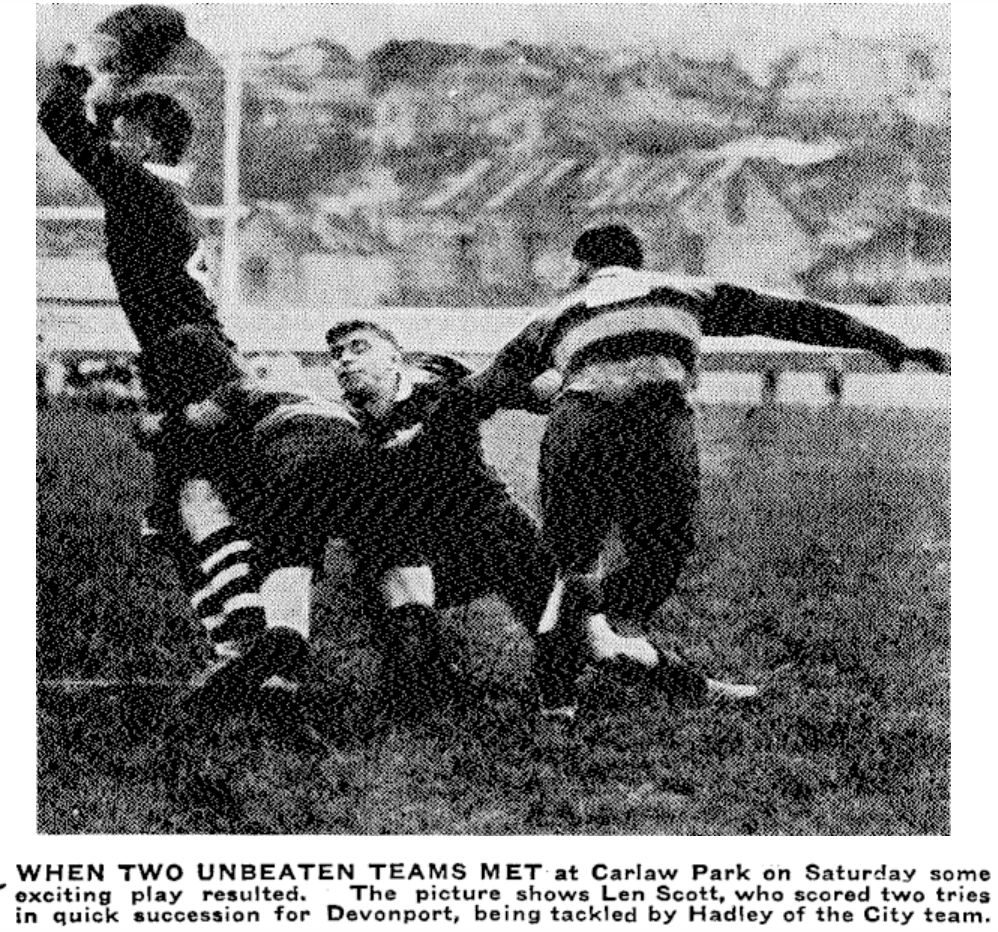

The Herald described him as "undoubtedly the fastest wing in the code. Time and again he turned defence into attack with his pace".

In July he was selected to play for Auckland against South Auckland. The match was played on 27 July with 10,000 in attendance. He scored a try in a close 11-8 victory for Auckland. His try came after Hec Brisbane engineered a movement which enabled Scott to "fly across wide out" to make the score 8-3.

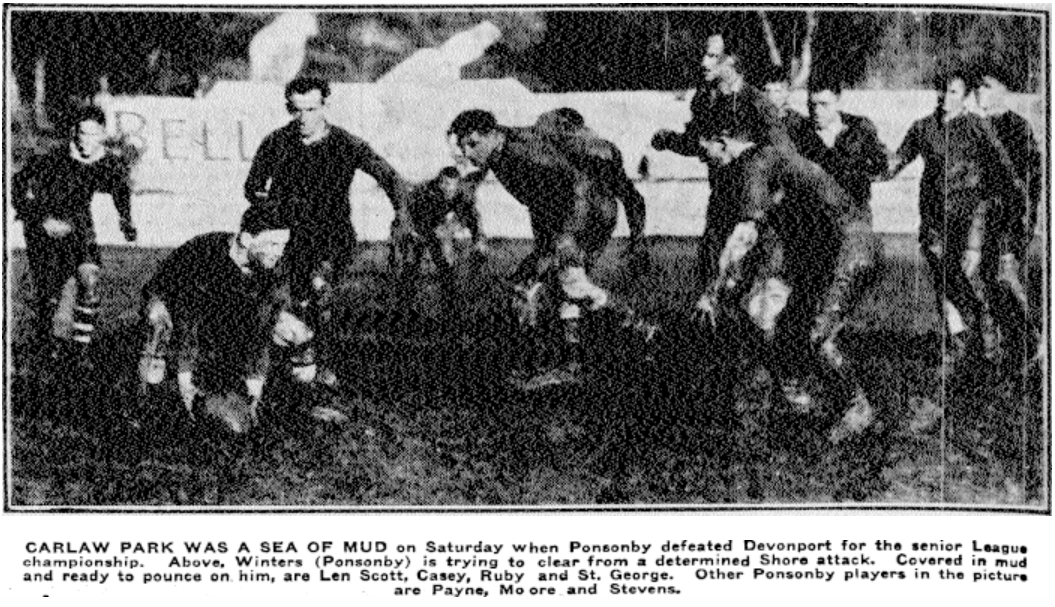

A week later he received an injury to his mouth in a match against Marist that needed stitches, and he had to wear a mask in their following match with Ponsonby. The match was with Ponsonby and was to decide the championship. Devonport lost 5-0 and finished runner up. It was said after the match that he "was disappointing on the wing, and appears to have lost all confidence". Despite this he was still named in the Auckland squad to play North Auckland. He was named to start but ultimately did not play. Possibly due to his injury. He was again named in the Auckland squad for their match with Canterbury but did not make the starting side. On 31 August he returned to some form in a Roope Rooster round 1 loss to Richmond with the Auckland Star saying he was "in great fettle".

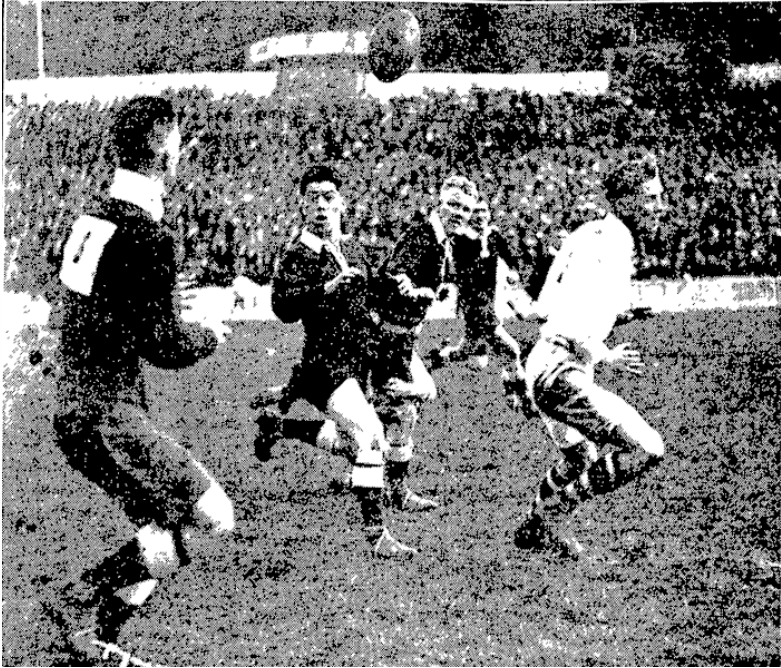
Len Scott about to receive a pass in the North Island v South Island match on 7 September 1929.

He was subsequently named in the North Island side for their inter-island match on 7 September. It was said that he "has not impressed lately, but can be relied upon in big football". The North Island side was upset 22-13 in a rare South Island win through this early era. Scott did not receive much ball on the wing and the Auckland Star remarked that he "was not impressive up till the time he was forced to retire. He has not proved himself the brilliant scoring winger that he was last season – a winger who held his own with the cream of England. His handling lacks the surety that he used to possess". Scott had gone off at halftime after having been injured earlier, and was replaced by Allan Seagar. With Devonport eliminated from the Roope Rooster competition it was to be Scott's last match of the season.

=== Move to Fiji ===
Early in the 1930 season it was reported that Scott had "gone to Suva, Fiji. The winger was not at his best last year, but he played some rattling good games at times. His determined dashes along touch will be missed by supporters of the code". It was also said that his cousin Alf would not be able to play the season for "business reasons". The reason for Scott's move to Fiji was not stated however he was back in Auckland by April 1931 and reported to be available for Devonport once more along with Alf. Len's other cousin Matt was the club's primary school delegate to the Auckland Rugby League.

=== Return to Devonport and Auckland Colts ===
In 18 matches for Devonport Scott scored 14 tries in the 1931 with 12 coming in senior competition which placed him first for senior try scorers once again. Curiously in his first match back against City Rovers on 2 May he played in the forwards and "acquitted himself well". He "showed up at times and powerful running on one occasion by which he beat several defenders would have resulted in a try but for a beautiful low tackle by Ben Davidson".

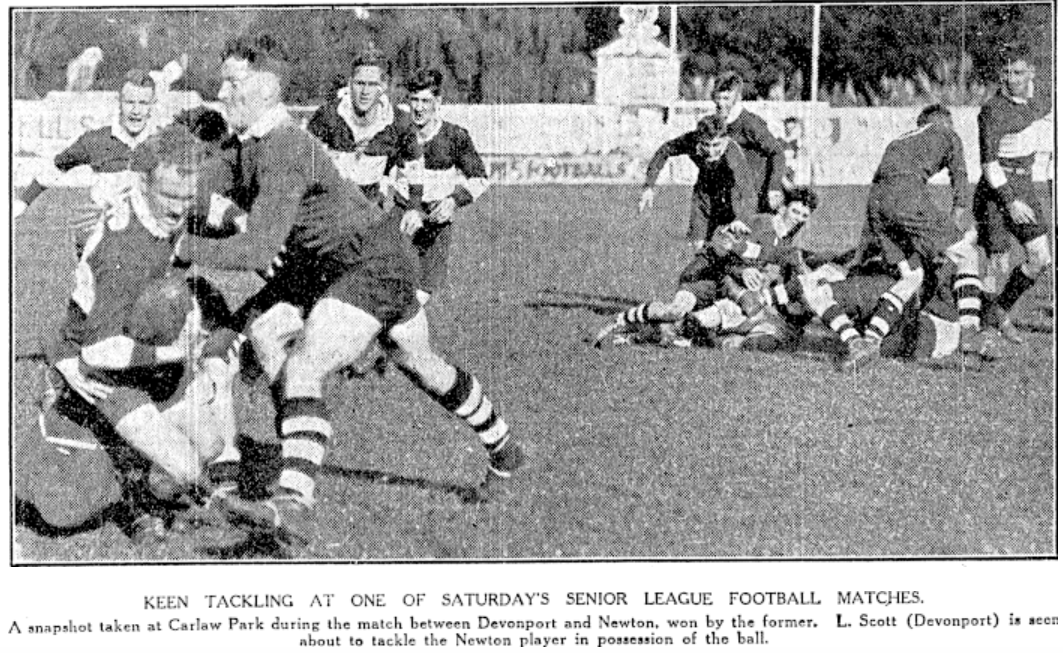

He moved back to his regular position on the wing for the following week against Newton and then over the following 4 matches he registered at least 1 try in each game. His try against Newton came when he received the ball from a "ruck at halfway and outpaced the opposition to score behind the posts". Two tries followed in a 23-12 win over the combined Ellerslie-Otahuhu side, 1 against Richmond, and then another against Ponsonby. Then on 27 June against City he "scored a fine try, was dashing and dangerous at all times on the move, and saved a score by City by coming across from the wing and upsetting Len Barchard when the Devonport defence was all at sixes and sevens". Despite this good form he then went three matches without registering a try and in a narrow win over Richmond on 11 July it was said "Len Scott had an off day and Mincham ran rings round him on several occasions". Devonport would ultimately finish runner up in the 1931 Fox Memorial championship 2 points behind Marist Old Boys.

In the first round of the Roope Rooster competition Devonport thrashed Newton by 41 points to 8 with Scott running in 4 tries. It was said that "Scott was right on form and had the defence bewildered at times with his brilliant dashes down the line". In the semi-final against Marist, Scott scored the deciding try after the scores were locked at 8-8 and he cared over near the corner. He then played a "good game on the wing" in Devonport's convincing 34-17 Roope Rooster final win over Ponsonby.

Following the match Scott was selected in the Auckland squad to play Northland at Carlaw Park on 26 September. However he was unavailable for the match along with 5 other players. A week later he played in the Stormont Shield final against Marist which Devonport won easily 25-6. Scott played well and set up tries for Allan Seagar. The following week Devonport had the opportunity for a unique matchup with a top New South Wales side, Eastern Suburbs. In 1929 South Sydney had become the first New South Wales side to travel to Auckland to take on local sides and in years thereafter sides would continue to do so. Devonport went down in a high scoring match 41-27 before a large crowd of 17,000. Scott scored a try and was said to be "in his best form of this season". The Herald said that he along with Ruby, Simpson, and Simons were the pick of the Devonport side.

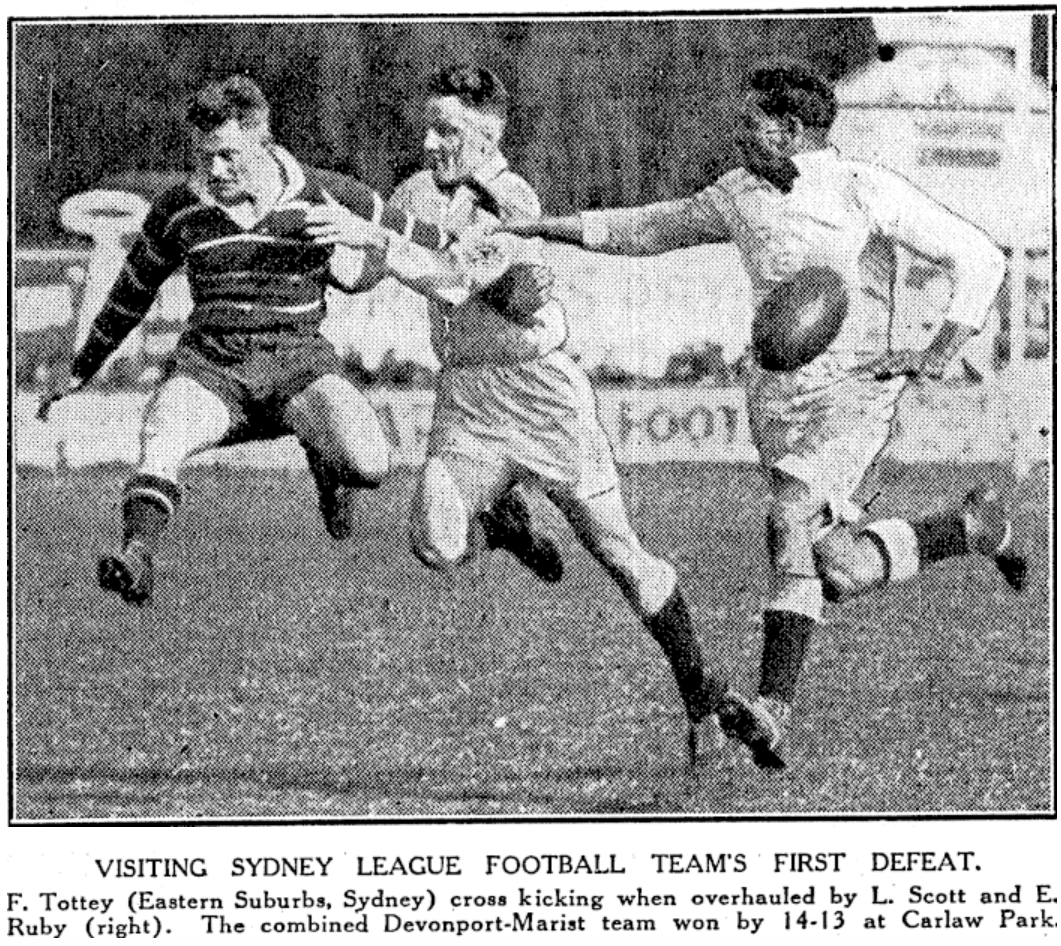

A week later a combined Devonport-Marist side was chosen to play the tourists with Scott on the wing. Norm Campbell of Marist was at fullback, along with Allan Seagar (Devonport), and Pat Meehan on the other wing (Marist). Dick Smith (Devonport), Hec Brisbane (Marist), and Wilf Hassan (Marist) made up the rest of a strong backline where 6 of the 7 either had represented or would go on to represent New Zealand. The combined side won the match 14-13 before 15,000 spectators at Carlaw Park. He scored their first try within a minute "when a smart movement on the left-wing allowed Len Scott to speed round past Fred Tottey and score easily". He did however drop a pass later in the match that cost his side a try. Scott's final match of the season came for an Auckland Colt's side. Scott was still relatively young, aged just 24 though it is unknown if there was any particular age limit for players selected in the side. This time Scott was on the losing side as Eastern Suburbs won 18-13.

=== New Zealand selection v England ===
The 1932 Devonport season for Scott was relatively quiet. He missed their first 5 games and did not reappear until round 6 on 11 June against Ponsonby. There was no reason given for his absence with the New Zealand Herald merely stating that "L. Scott made a reappearance for Devonport and showed all his speed". He played in 3 more matches for Devonport before the club season took a break as rep sides began to play in anticipation of the touring England side which was arriving in July. Scott uncharacteristically failed to score in any of the 4 matches he had played for Devonport. Nonetheless he was still selected for the Auckland side to play South Auckland (northern Waikato) on 16 July. The selection was notable for Bert Cooke the famous All Black being included to make his debut at five eighth after only having recently switched codes. Auckland won the match 29-13 with Scott scoring a try after "Brisbane sent to Cooke, to Scott, the last named racing round [most likely Wally] Tittleton at fullback to score behind the posts. Wally's brother George Tittleton was also playing on the wing and would later be Scott's teammate in a 1936 test against England. In the second half Scott was involved in a "fine passing" movement with Brisbane, Cooke, and Davidson but "Scott held on just a fraction too long before returning to Davidson, and a great scoring chance was lost". Scott's performance was impressive enough for the sole selector, Thomas McClymont (more commonly known as "Scotty", to pick him in the North Island side to play the South Island on 23 July. The Auckland Star said that "Len Scott, the Devonport flyer is lucky, but, as past performances have proved, he has the right temperament for big play, otherwise Davidson might have been retained." He was joined in the three-quarters by Claude List on the other wing, and Cooke at centre. Before a crowd of 15,000 at Carlaw Park the three of them had a field day in a 27-18 win when they scored all 7 of the North Island sides tries. Scott and Cooke scored 3 each while List also scored once. He missed a try early in the match after trying to take a pass from Cooke one handed with a clear run in. Scott's first came after backline passing saw McIntyre move the ball "to Brisbane, to Cooke, to Scott, who went across at the corner" to make the score 9-6 to the South Island. The next try was similar with Scott again on the end of passing from Brisbane and Cooke leaving Scott with "a clear run across". The conversion gave the North Island a 13-9 lead. The third try for Scott once again came after backline passing involving the same players though this time Scott had "to race around Harrison" before he could score. Towards the end of the game he returned to favour to Cooke when he passed back infield to him allowing Cooke to cross for a try. Despite Scott being described as taking "every opportunity to score" the Auckland Star suggested that he "was uncertain". He was however picked for the first test by selectors T.A. McClymont (Auckland), Archie Ferguson (Auckland), and J Sanders (Christchurch).

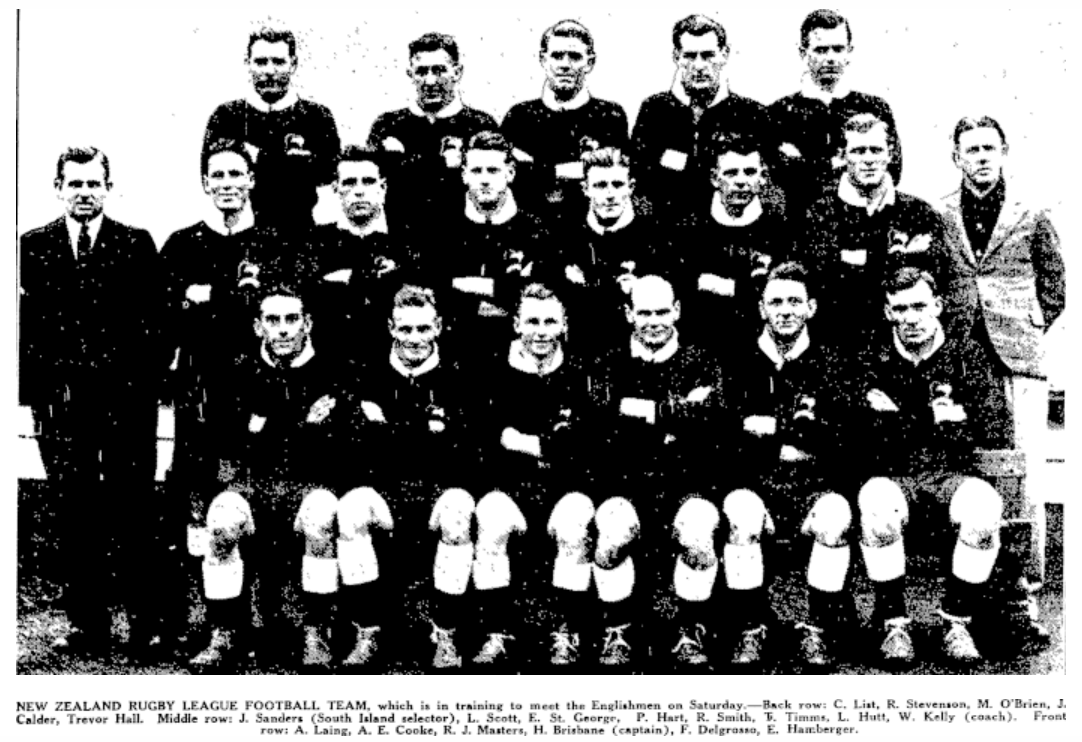

Scott was joined in the test side by his Devonport team mates Albert Laing and Dick Smith. Unfortunately all three would have a match to forget and were dropped for the second test. The first test was played at Carlaw Park before a crowd of 25,000 and saw New Zealand comprehensively outplayed, losing 24-9. New Zealand won very little scrum ball (just 12 out of 50 scrums were won by New Zealand) and the backs were starved of possession. Allen St George the New Zealand hooker who was also on debut was also dropped from the side following the match. Scott and Dick Smith on the wings "never saw the ball in orthodox attack. That was not their fault, but in individual effort neither ... was up to the standard that one expects in big league football".

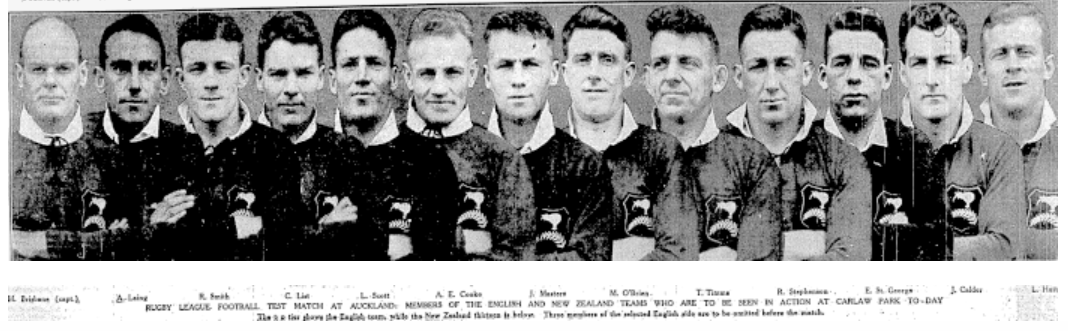

The defence of Scott, Smith and Albert Laing was questioned, "for neither our wingers nor the full-back were equal to the occasion. Scott, who was expected to make the "come back" he made against Parkin's side in 1928, showed no initiative and Smith, well, he wilted. It was too grave a risk with both of these players, one of whom had made no pretense to being a wing three-quarter (Smith)...". During the second half Scott made a weak kick that "saw Silcock, Fildes and Feetham attack" with Feetham scoring. For the second test all three were dropped and replaced by Steve Watene, Bert Cooke (who was moving from five eighth), and Ben Davidson. New Zealand lost 25 to 14 in Christchurch.

Scott was chosen as a reserve for the Auckland team to play England on 6 August but was not required to take the field. He then returned to the Devonport side which played their final match of the Fox Memorial competition which they had already won prior to the break in the competition. They beat City Rovers 19-13 and finished 4 points ahead of nearest rivals Marist to claim their second consecutive title and third in their history. They were then knocked out of the Roope Rooster in the second round though Scott managed to cross for a try in the 19-18 loss. Scott then traveled with the Devonport side to New Plymouth where they played an exhibition match against a Ponsonby XIII which included some guest players. The match was played at Pukekura Park and before 5,000 spectators the match was drawn 29-28 with Scott scoring a try. His final two appearances of the year came in the Stormont Shield final loss to Marist by 15 points to 8, and the Thistle Cup final loss to City by 22 points to 19. He scored a try in the loss to Marist.

=== Break from the game (1933-34) and return in 1935 ===
It is unclear what Scott's intentions were but in May of 1933 he applied for reinstatement into rugby union to the New Zealand Rugby Union.

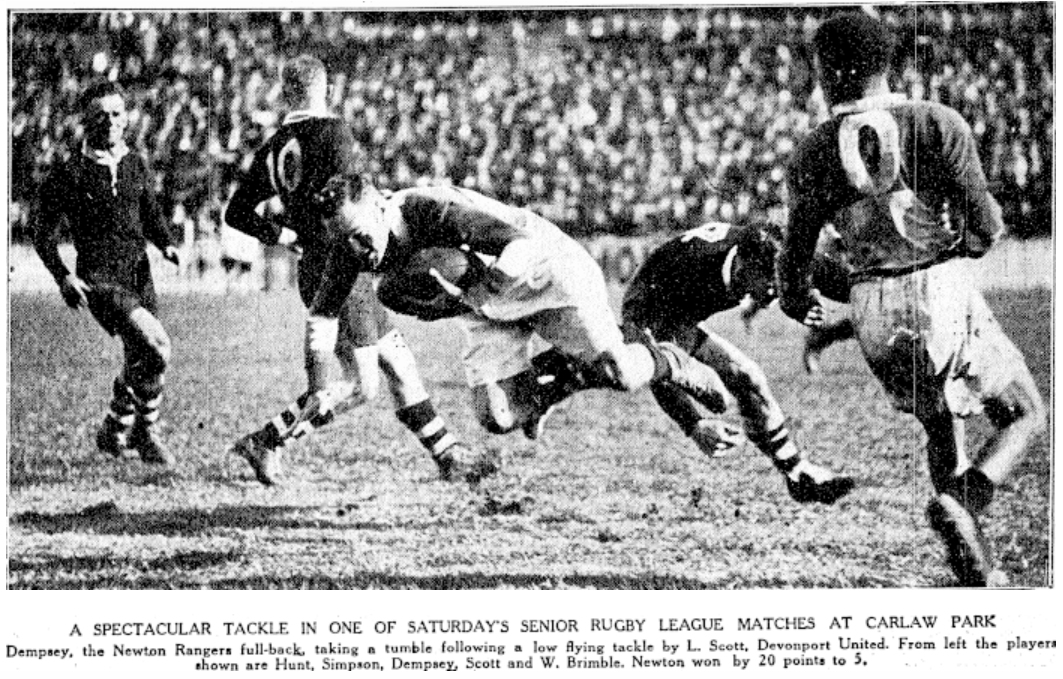

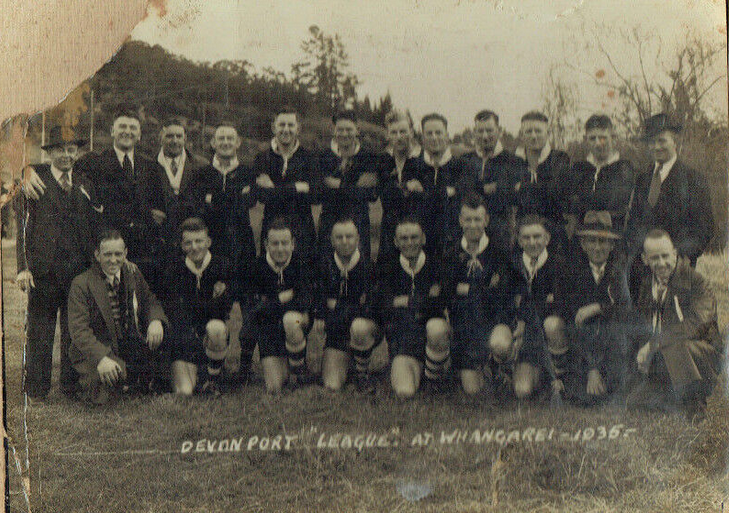
Len Scott in the Devonport side to play Whangarei at Jubilee Park on 14 September.

However there is no evidence of him actually playing rugby in any newspapers of the time which documented both codes fairly comprehensively. He didn't play at all in 1934 either and then on 2 May 1935 at the New Zealand Rugby League meeting he was reinstated back into the rugby league code. He would be rejoining his Devonport side after the Auckland Rugby league registered him with them. In his first match back for the side he played their round 2 match against City on 4 May and scored a try. He ultimately played 12 games for Devonport and scored 6 tries. He missed 3 matches during the season which had been uncharacteristic in playing seasons prior. Against Marist in round 8 the New Zealand Herald reported that "a sensational try was scored by L. Scott, who followed up his own kick and actually took the ball before it touched O'Shannassey's hands". Then in round 13 against Ponsonby he "dashed in and flew away to score a beautiful try in a way that was reminiscent of his play when he was one of the star representative three-quarters several seasons back".

=== Return to New Zealand test side ===
The 1936 season saw Scott play 18 matches for Devonport and a return to try scoring form. He scored 13 tries in total and 12 in senior club competitions which placed him third highest try scorer behind Lou Brown and Roy Bright. Against Mount Albert in round 2 he scored "a grand try", when he "ran half the length of the field to score". The try proved to be the difference in a 10-5 victory. Then the following week against Marist the Auckland Star reported that "Scott appears to have struck the form he displayed several years ago, when he was one of the best point getters in the code. His try was scored after racing practically the whole length of the field. He has lost none of his pace as he showed a clean pair of heels to the opposition, after beating two men". After a try against Marist and another against Newton the Herald described him as "perhaps the best of the three-quarters" in the match with the later side. In round 6 in a 13-13 draw with Richmond, one of their nearest rivals at the top of the table, he "got his side out of a great deal of trouble and on several occasions the winger prevented tries by overhauling opponents from behind". Then a week later in a top of the table match with Ponsonby which Devonport lost 17-15 the Auckland Star said "Len Scott registered a try by dribbling through and diving on the ball. Later he almost repeated the dose, as throughout he was on the alert to snap up the slightest offering" and he "was always dangerous when there was an opening".

Scott's form had been good enough to see him chosen in the Auckland side to play New Zealand Māori. The Māori side won the match 30-21 at Carlaw Park. Then back for Devonport in a 4 July draw with Marist he "intercepted a wild pass and raced 60 yards to score a spectacular try". Scott was then chosen in a New Zealand trial match to be played as curtain-raiser to the North Island – South Island interisland match. He was picked on the wing in the A Team. The selector was Bert Avery and he and the New Zealand selectors were endeavouring to find the best players to represent New Zealand in the test series with the touring England team. In a 16-13 loss by his side he was said to have shown "dash on the wing". He was one of the best A Team backs along with Stockley, though he was replaced at halftime by Owen Wilkie to give the New Zealand selectors the opportunity to see all the players.

He played in matches for Devonport against Newton and City, scoring a try in each and then picked in the New Zealand side for the 3rd time in his career to play his 5th test. The Auckland Star said that his "form on the wing justified his inclusion in the test match next Saturday, and the crowd will be looking for the characteristic try which he seems to gather in every match as the result of sheer opportunism".

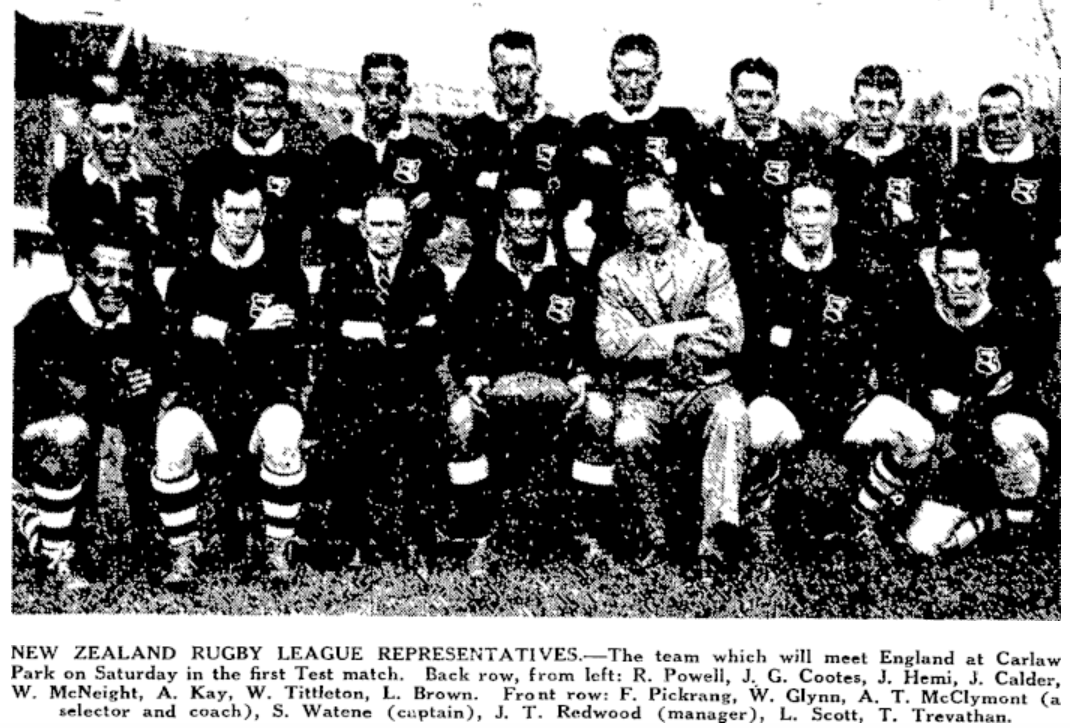

He was chosen to play for New Zealand in his normal position on the wing with Jack Hemi behind him at fullback and Lou Brown on the other wing. Wally Tittleton was in the centres with Tommy Trevarthan and Arthur Kay in the five eights positions and Roy Powell at halfback.

The match saw New Zealand defeated in a hard-fought match 10-8 before 22,000 spectators at Carlaw Park on 8 August. Scott was slightly injured early in the match when he received a kick which "appeared to put him off his usual game". Scott was named in the second test team in an unchanged backline aside from Claude Dempsey who came in to replace an injured Jack Hemi at fullback. Scott was however replaced in the side after not being able to recover from his leg injury and Ted Mincham replaced him on the wing for the second test.

Scott then returned to his Devonport side 2 weeks later after recovering from his injury and played 5 further matches. The first against Richmond on 22 August saw the debut of Len's cousin Verdun Scott in the Devonport side. The Auckland Star erroneously reported "A likely, tall young winger, V. Scott, brother of Len Scott, made his debut on one flank". Verdun would famously go on to represent New Zealand at both rugby league and cricket and he remains to this day the only person to have done so. In a round 1 Roope Rooster match which Devonport won 20-6 over Mount Albert Len scored two tries while having an "experimental run with the forwards", and Verdun kicked 4 goals. Curiously the Mount Albert side also had three members of the same family with the Schultz family well represented but the Star reported that the "Scott trinity was more prominent". Their season concluded after a Phelan Shield semi final loss to Ponsonby on 26 September with Len crossing for another try.

=== North Shore Albions ===
In 1937 the Devonport United club decided to revert to their original name which was North Shore Albions. They had adopted the name ‘Devonport United' many years earlier after a merger with their neighbours Sunnyside. In 14 matches for them Scott scored 5 tries. His first two came in a match against Marist on 24 April and the first was significant as it was the 100th try of his career for his club. He became the first player in the history of Auckland Rugby League to achieve this feat. The Auckland Star remarked after the match that "two fine tries by Len Scott, one of the most prolific scoring wingers in the code, turned the scales in favour of North Shore". He uncharacteristically went 4 matches without scoring before standing down for an injury in a round 5 match. He scored a try from halfway against Newton on 12 June which was described as a "typical try" for him. After a round 10 win over City the New Zealand Herald said that Scott "showed a lot of dash on the wing. His form is still good and he should be considered for representative honours". Scott missed selection for the New Zealand trial match which had been organised for the selectors to choose the New Zealand side to play Australia. The Herald suggested "the omission of L. Scott, the North Shore winger, comes as a surprise. Scott has shown better form this season than at any stage of his career and his speed alone should have been a deciding factor in comparing him with the wings chosen". Scott then played a match against Newton before missing 5 straight games, though the reason is unknown. He did however return to the side to play in their last match of the season which was their Phelan Shield final win, 16-10 over Mount Albert. He was said to have played "safely".

The 1938 season was to be the beginning of the end for Scott's time on the field for North Shore. He played 10 matches and scored 3 tries. He played intermittently throughout the year with his first game coming in round 2 against Manukau. He played in the forwards and "was responsible for a try that was full of merit" in a 26-21 loss. Then in a 15 – 11 win a week later over Mount Albert he "scored a spectacular try, outpacing the opposition". The Herald said that "L. Scott, the speedy winger, has made good in the forwards, and he appears to have sharpened up the loose play. Scott was a tower of strength to his team by fast following up. His fine try was well deserved". The North Shore side was at this time being coached by Bob Banham, and Australian who had been brought to Auckland by Auckland Rugby League to assist with the coaching of sides and he spent the initial part of the season playing and coaching the North Shore side. He was however moved back to the backline for the following weeks match with Richmond and then City. He missed North Shore's game with Papakura in round 6 before being injured just before halftime in their round 7 match with Ponsonby at the Devonport Domain. He ultimately missed 6 matches before returning to play Papakura on 30 July in round 15. He scored a try in a 13-5 win where he played at centre. It was said that he "often found the ball very difficult to handle" after "the week's heavy rain. Patches of sticky mud like a gluepot… rendered the ball very difficult to handle". The Star said that "the Shore backs were definitely superior, and E. Scott, L. Scott, and V. Scott were all impressive" Len then missed their match with City before playing sporadically over the remainder of the season before their final match with Papakura on 17 September which they lost 17-12.

The 1939 season saw Scott fail to make an appearance for North Shore. Then in 1940 he came out of retirement to assist the North Shore side as they struggled for senior playing numbers due to so many of their players having enlisted in the military for World War II. He turned out in one match against City Rovers on 10 August in round 15. North Shore won the match 17-8 with Scott said to have "harassed the opposition" along with Wilkie and Donaldson. And he apparently "showed dash on the wing". This was to be the final match in Scott's historic career.

== Personal life ==
Len married Laura Jennings Johnson on 23 September 1939. They had a son on 12 July 1942 at Pentlands, Devonport. They had a daughter on 14 March 1945 in Glen Eden.

Len was a carpenter by trade and they lived in the Devonport area for most of their lives. In 1942 they were living at 8 Rata Rd in Devonport. In 1946 according to census records they were living at 91 Vauxhill Rd, in 1949 at 12 Sinclair St, in 1954 at 53 Old Lake Rd, and in 1957 at 42 Ngataringa Rd. All addresses in or near the Devonport area.

Leonard Scott died in Devonport on 4 June 1986, aged 79.
