= Ambrose Askin =

English rugby league footballer

Personal information
- Full name: Ambrose Askin
- Born: 24 February 1909 Pontefract district, England
- Died: January 1979 (aged 69) Pontefract district, England

Playing information
- Height: 5 ft 11.5 in (1.816 m)
- Weight: 13 st 7 lb (86 kg)
- Position: Fullback
Club
Years	Team	Pld	T	G	FG	P
1931–37	Castleford	89	7	0	0	21
1937–38	Keighley
1938–38/39	Featherstone Rovers	14	0	0	0	0
	Total	103	7	0	0	21
- Relatives: Tom Askin (brother)
- Military career
- Allegiance: United Kingdom
- Branch: British Army
- Service years: 1939-1945
- Conflicts: World War II; Battle of Dunkirk

Ambrose Askin (24 February 1909 – January 1979) was an English professional rugby league footballer who played in the 1930s. He played at club level for Castleford, Keighley, and Featherstone Rovers, as a wing. Ambrose Askin's funeral took place at St Botolph's Church, Knottingley.

== Playing career ==
=== County League appearances ===
Ambrose Askin played in Castleford's victory in the Yorkshire League during the 1932–33 season.

=== Club career ===
Ambrose Askin made his debut for Castleford at Hull F.C. on 26 March 1932, a match in which his brother Tom was unable to play due to injury. He had joined the club after leaving the army. In November 1936, when aged 25, he was put on the transfer list at a price of £200; at that time he weighed 13.5 stone and stood 5 feet 11.5 inches tall.

Askin was transferred from Keighley to Featherstone Rovers in January 1938, with Cyril Hammond moving in the opposite direction. He made his debut for Featherstone on 15 January, but the outbreak of World War II on 1 September 1939 meant his opportunities to play for Featherstone Rovers were curtailed, and injuries sustained in the Battle of Dunkirk ended his rugby career.

== Outside of rugby league ==
After the end of World War II, Ambrose Askin became a fish fryer in Knottingley, living at 4 Cardwell Terrace, Foundry Lane, Knottingley.
