= De Lacy (disambiguation) =

de Lacy is a surname, particularly of a Norman aristocratic family.

De Lacy or variants may also refer to:

- De Lacy Academy, a school in Knottingley, Wakefield, West Yorkshire, England
- De'Lacy, American 1990s house-music group
- De Lacy O'Leary (1872–1957), British Orientalist

== See also ==
- Lacy (disambiguation)
