= Listed buildings in Knottingley and Ferrybridge =

Knottingley is a town, and Ferrybridge is a village, in the Knottingley ward in the metropolitan borough of the City of Wakefield, West Yorkshire, England. They contain eight listed buildings that are recorded in the National Heritage List for England. All the listed buildings are designated at Grade II, the lowest of the three grades, which is applied to "buildings of national importance and special interest". The listed buildings consist of two churches, houses, a former toll house, two war memorials, and a building in a former power station.

== Buildings ==
Name and location	Photograph	Date	Notes
St Andrew's Church, Ferrybridge; 53.71158°N 1.27370°W		12th century	The church was later extended, it was restored in 1878–79 by Ewan Christian, and moved to its present site in 1952–53. It is built in magnesian limestone cladding brick, and has a slate roof. The church consists of a nave, a north porch, a south aisle, a chancel with a south chapel, and a west tower embraced by the nave. The tower has a round-headed west window, square bell windows, and an embattled parapet.
Pear Tree Cottage, Knottingley; 53.70999°N 1.24626°W	—	17th century or earlier	The kitchen to a former manor house, later enlarged and converted into a private house, it is in rendered magnesian limestone, with a slate roof. There are two storeys and an attic, one bay, and lean-to extensions on the north and east. All the openings have been altered, and inside is a deep inglenook fireplace.
St Botolph's Church, Knottingley; 53.71097°N 1.24438°W		c. 1755	The rebuilding of a medieval chapel, retaining some Norman fabric, the tower was added in 1873 and heightened in 1887, the chancel was extended in 1886, and the nave was restored in 1887. The church is built in magnesian limestone, the body is rendered, and the roof is in stone slate. It consists of a nave with a square-roofed south porch, a chancel, and a west tower. The tower has four stages, angle buttresses, a lancet window in the bottom stage, a circular window in the second stage, a clock face in the third stage, lancet bell openings in the top stage, and an embattled parapet with corner pinnacles. The windows in the nave have round heads, imposts and keystones, and in the chancel they are lancets.
Old Toll House, Ferrybridge; 53.71540°N 1.27064°W		c. 1804	The former toll house is in sandstone, with a band, and a hipped slate roof. There is a cruciform plan, consisting of a central block with two storeys, three bays, and a canted front, and flanking single-storey single-bay flat-roofed wings. In the centre is a doorway with a fanlight, some windows are sashes, and others have been altered.
Library, Knottingley; 53.71094°N 1.24376°W		Early 19th century	A house, at one time a library, it is stuccoed, on a plinth, with sill bands, a parapet, and a slate roof. There are two storeys and a symmetrical front of three bays. In the centre is a round-headed doorway with a Tuscan architrave, imposts, a semicircular fanlight, and an open pediment. The windows are sashes, the window above the doorway with a moulded architrave.
War memorial, Ferrybridge; 53.71389°N 1.26833°W		1921	The war memorial stands near a road junction, and is in Aberdeen granite. It consists of an obelisk on a high square pedestal, and a three-stepped plinth. On the front of the obelisk is a sword carved in relief, dates, and a laurel wreath. The pedestal has a moulded cap with a triangular pediment in the centre of each face, and a moulded base. On the front is an inscription, and on each face are the names of those lost in the two World Wars.
War memorial, Knottingley; 53.71003°N 1.24393°W		1920s	The war memorial stands near a road junction, and is in white granite. It consists of a pillar with a moulded cap, on a pedestal of four stepped blocks. On the pillar is a bronze statue depicting a flying angel holding a wreath and a trumpet. On the pedestal is an inscription, and the names of those lost in the two World Wars.
Main building, Ferrybridge A Power Station; 53.71668°N 1.27115°W		1926	The building, later used for other purposes, is in red brick with white terracotta dressings. There is a terracotta plinth and entablature, and on the front the bays are defined by giant brick pilasters with moulded terracotta bases and capitals. Above is a plain frieze, a dentilled cornice, and a flat roof. The south front is symmetrical, with four storeys and nine bays. The central bay projects and contains a doorway with an architrave, a rectangular fanlight, and a cornice, and above it is a giant round-headed stair window with an architrave and keystones. In the outer bays, there are lorry doors in the ground floor and small-paned windows.
