= Knottingley =

Town in the City of Wakefield, West Yorkshire, England

Coordinates: 53.705°N 1.249°W

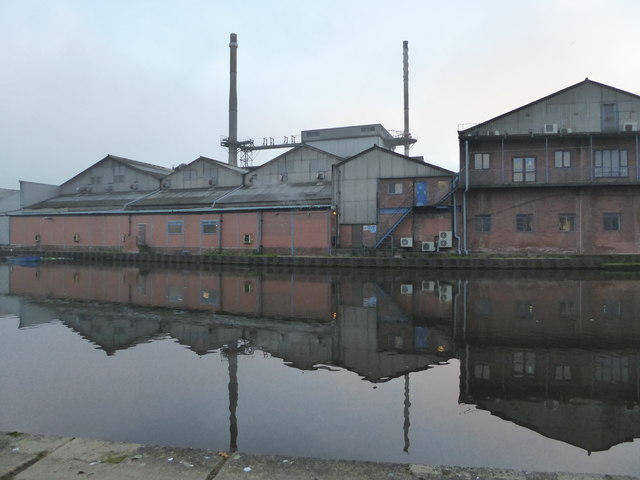
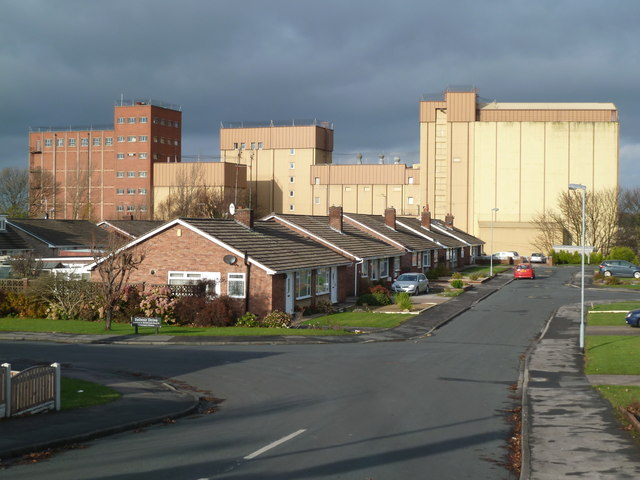
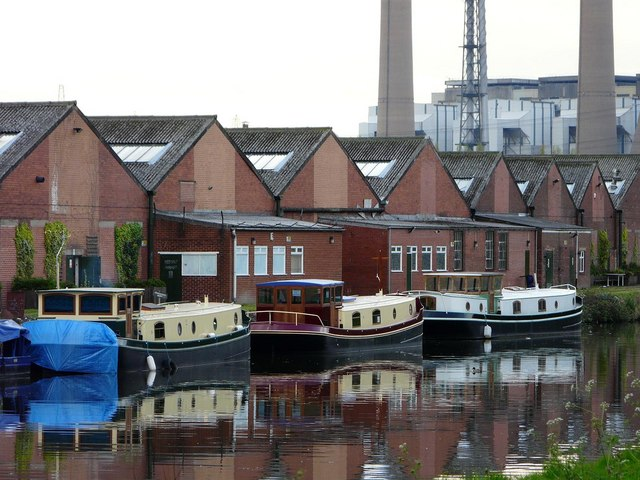
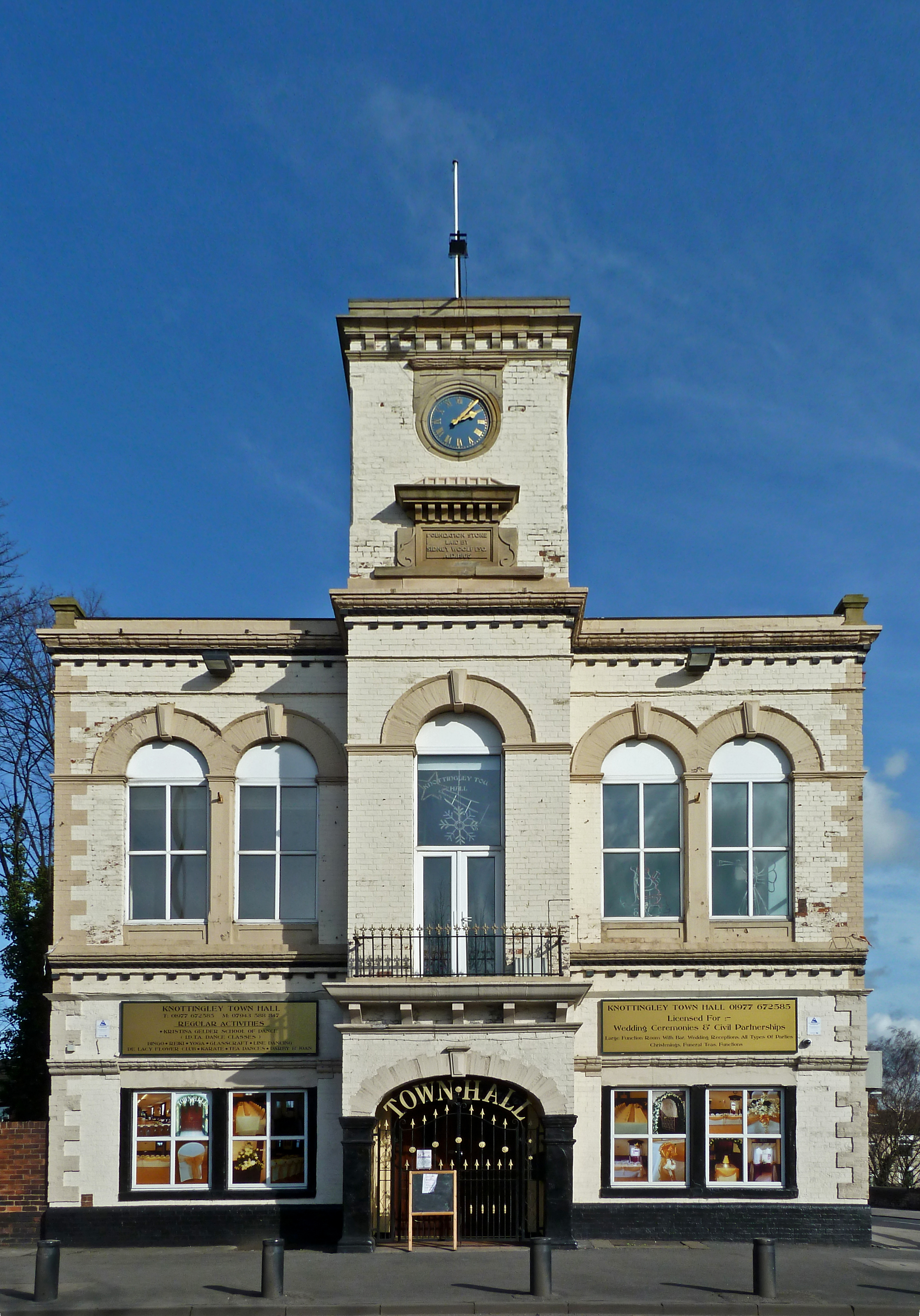
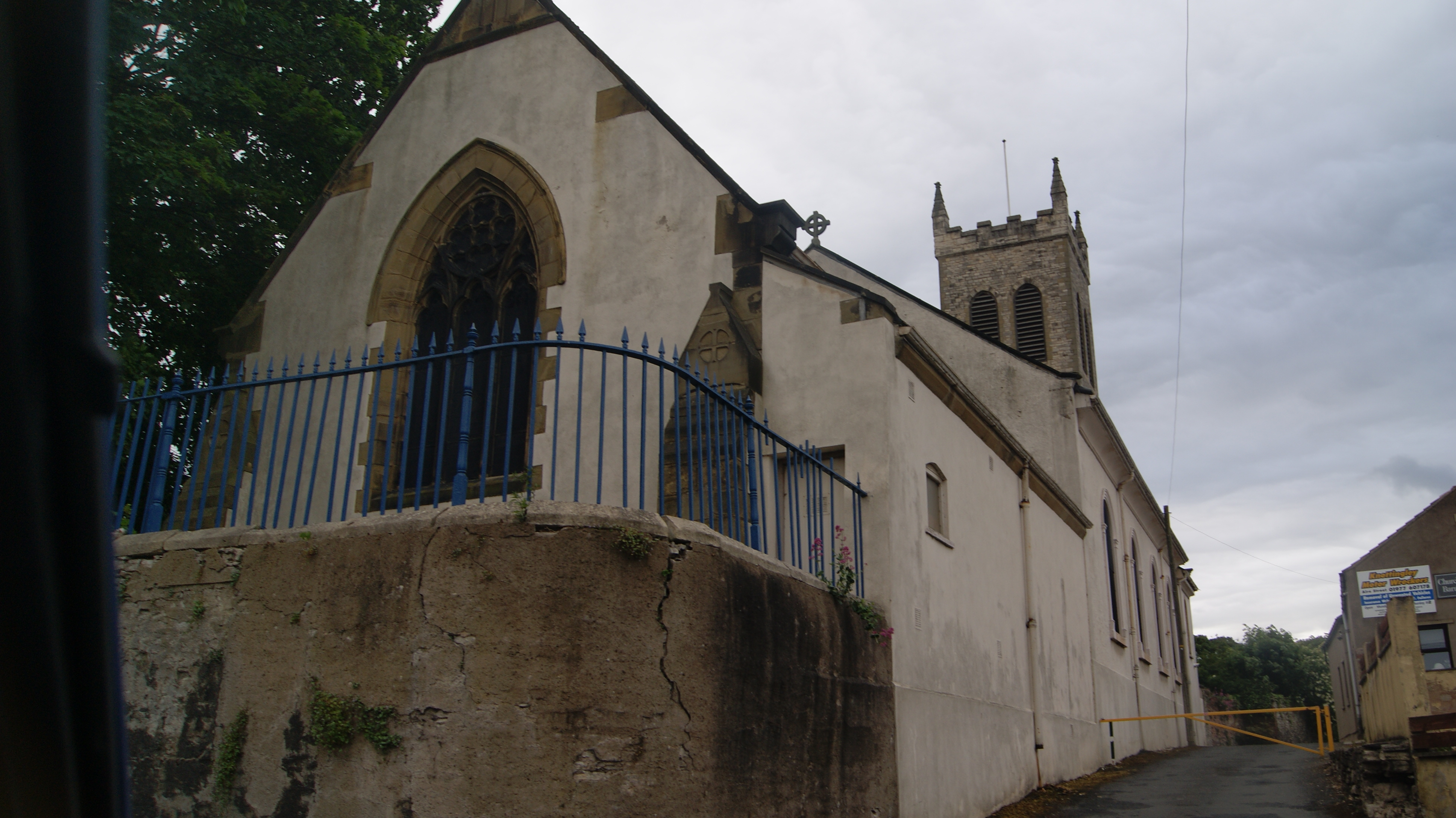
- Allied Glassworks Kings Mill The River Aire Town Hall St Botolph's Church

- Location within West Yorkshire
- Population: 13,710 (Ward. 2011)
- OS grid reference: SE495235
- Metropolitan borough: City of Wakefield
- Metropolitan county: West Yorkshire
- Region: Yorkshire and the Humber
- Country: England
- Sovereign state: United Kingdom
- Post town: KNOTTINGLEY
- Postcode district: WF11
- Dialling code: 01977
- Police: West Yorkshire
- Fire: West Yorkshire
- Ambulance: Yorkshire
- UK Parliament: Pontefract, Castleford and Knottingley

Knottingley is a town in the City of Wakefield, West Yorkshire, England. It lies on the river Aire and the old A1 road before it was bypassed as the A1(M). Historically part of the West Riding of Yorkshire, it has a population of 13,503, increasing to 13,710 for the City of Wakefield ward at the 2011 Census. It makes up the majority of the Knottingley ward represented on Wakefield Council.

Close to Knottingley is Ferrybridge Power Station, which had the largest cooling towers of their kind in Europe. Three of these towers collapsed in high winds in 1965. The remaining towers, which could be seen for miles around, were demolished between 2019 and 2022. The town was the last in the United Kingdom to have a working deep coal mine, Kellingley Colliery, until it closed in December 2015.

== Toponymy ==
Knottingley means "the clearing of Cnotta's people", from the Old English personal name Cnotta meaning "knot", describing a small, round man and -ingas "people of" and leāh "wood, modern lee. (Note: Not the same meaning as Leah (personal name).) The name was recorded as Cnotinesleahemm in 1128.

== History ==
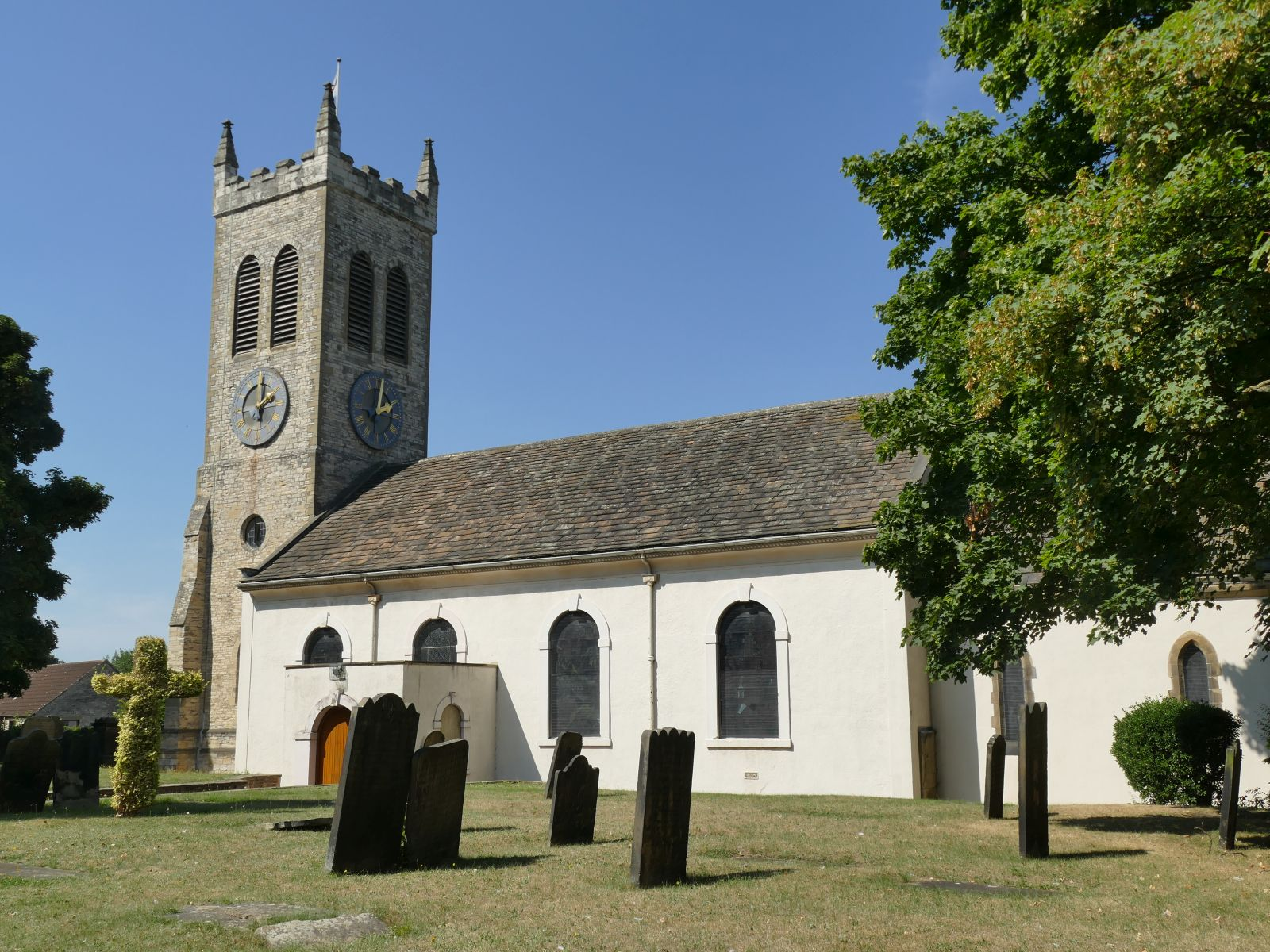
St Botolph's Church

During the three Sieges of Pontefract Castle, Oliver Cromwell took residence in the town of Knottingley, believed to be in Wildbore House. The house was later demolished, when its land was mined as a quarry for the limestone underneath.

Knottingley, inextricably linked with Ferrybridge, is a West Yorkshire town whose history is tied to river travel and industry. It has managed to retain certain elements of that industrial history as thriving enterprises today, providing employment for many of its combined population of some 17,000. It was originally an Anglo-Saxon settlement, though the ancient monument of Ferrybridge Henge shows it had significant indigenous habitation long before then.

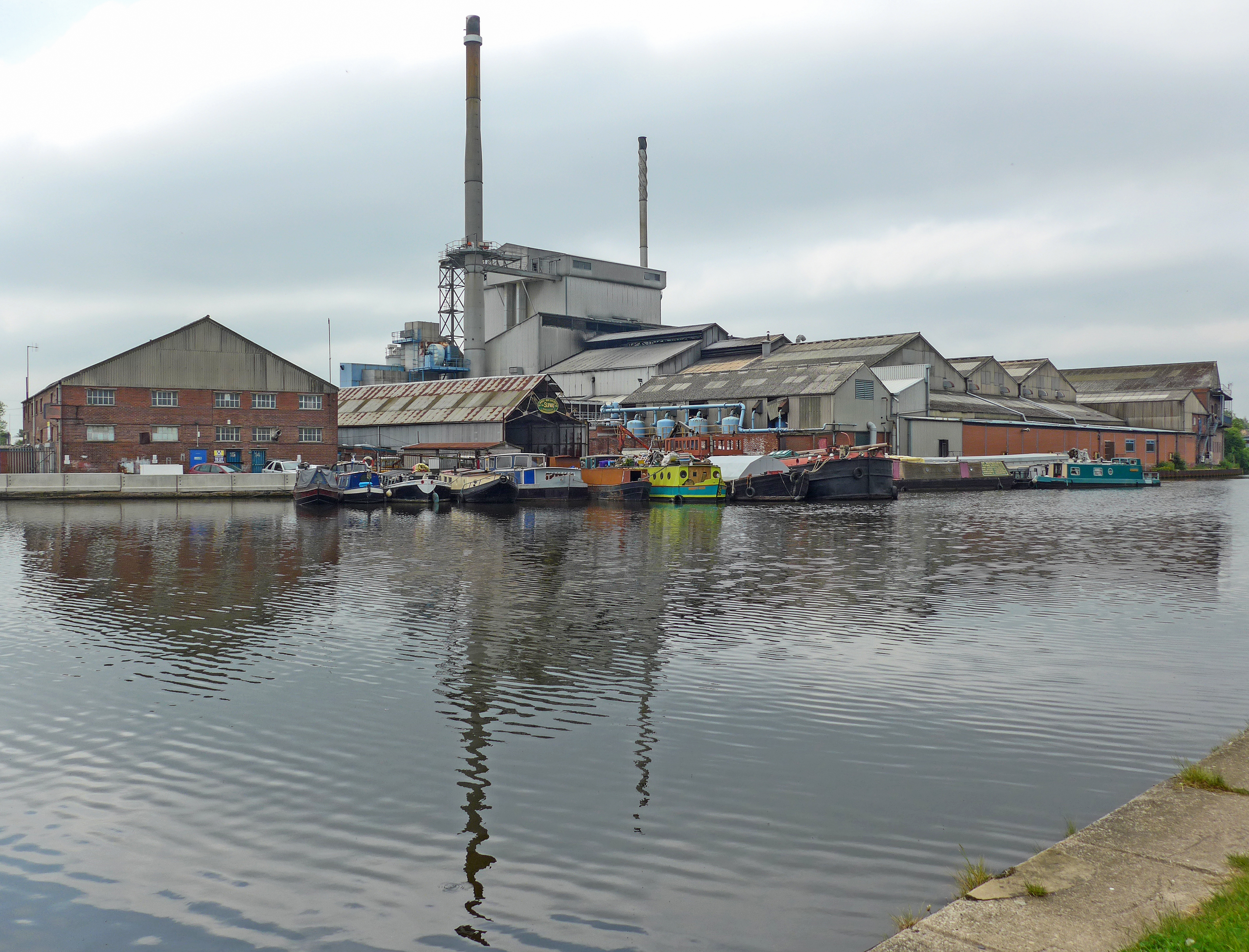
Aire & Calder Navigation

The crossing over the Aire at Ferrybridge was of importance for many centuries. A bridge was built there in 1198, and another to replace it two centuries later. Located on the Great North Road linking London with York and Edinburgh beyond that, the town became an important staging place for the coach traffic on that route.

Until 1699, it was an important inland river port, of some note. It was long the last navigable point on the Aire, until the Aire and Calder Navigation, built in 1704 and widened in 1826, enabled barges to make it to Leeds. Its shipyards built and maintained both inland and seagoing vessels.

Pottery was a significant industry for the town from the 19th century until as late as the 1940s, when the Australian Pottery, opened to cater to that country's needs, finally closed. Knottingley continued as a centre for boat building into the 20th century.

After 1870, the town became known for glass manufacturing. In 1887, Bagley's Glassworks purchased the rights to the first bottle-making machine, invented by a Ferrybridge postmaster. There is a Bagley's Glass gallery in Pontefract Museum. Glass manufacturing continues to be important.

The town had Kellingley Colliery operating until December 2015; the demand for coal was largely driven by Ferrybridge Power Station. Whilst most of the coal bound for Ferrybridge left by the railway, some was transported up river using barges, the last of which was delivered in December 2002. The last miners, their families and many former miners marched from Knottingley Town Hall to the Social Club in December 2015.

== Education ==
The town has several primary schools: England Lane Academy, Willow Green Academy, Knottingley St Botolph's C of E Academy, The Vale Primary Academy and Simpson's Lane Academy.

There is one high school, De Lacy Academy, formerly known as Knottingley High School and Sports College.

Sixth-form colleges are located in nearby Pontefract, Wakefield and Selby.

== Transport ==
Knottingley railway station is served by a half-hourly service to Leeds, on two routes operated by Northern Trains:

- 1 tph via Pontefract Monkhill and Castleford
- 1 tph via Pontefract Monkhill, Pontefract Tanshelf and Wakefield Westgate.

Bus services are operated predominantly by Arriva Yorkshire, but also by Ross Travel and Stevenson's Travel. Routes connect the town with Castleford, Pontefract, Selby and Wakefield.

== Media ==
Local news and television programmes are provided by BBC Yorkshire and ITV Yorkshire. Television signals are received from the Emley Moor TV transmitter.

Local radio stations are BBC Radio Leeds on 92.4 FM, Greatest Hits Radio Yorkshire (formerly Radio Aire and Ridings FM) on 96.3 and 106.8 FM, Hits Radio West Yorkshire on 102.5 FM, Heart Yorkshire on 106.2 FM, Capital Yorkshire on 105.1 and 105.8 FM and 5 Towns FM, a community radio station that broadcasts from Castleford.

The town is served by the local newspapers, Wakefield Express and the Pontefract and Castleford Express.

== Sport ==
A short lived greyhound racing track existed from 1940 to 1946 and again during 1947. The racing was independent (Note: It was not affiliated to the sports governing body, the National Greyhound Racing Club.) and was known as a flapping track, the nickname given to independent tracks. The venue could accommodate up to 3,000 people.

The town is home to a rugby union club, which plays at Marsh Lane.

== Notable people ==
- Ambrose Askin, rugby league footballer who played in the 1930s
- Tom Askin, international rugby league footballer who played in the 1920s and 1930s
- Percy Bentley, one of four soldiers to be awarded the Military Cross four times
- Terry Cooper, former Leeds United and England footballer
- Rev Thomas Dealtry, born here in 1796
- Wayne Godwin, Bradford rugby league footballer and also played for Knottingley Rockware ARLFC
- Tom Gordon, MP for Harrogate and Knaresborough
- Zak Hardaker, Leeds rugby league footballer, and also played for Knottingley Rockware ARLFC
- Bill Horton rugby league footballer who played in the 1920s and 1930s for: Wakefield Trinity, Yorkshire, England and Great Britain
- Simon Middleton, former rugby union and rugby league player and current England Rugby women's coach
- Dale Morton, Wakefield Trinity rugby league footballer and also played for Knottingley Rockware ARLFC
- Craig Moss, Keighley rugby league footballer, and also played for Knottingley Rockware ARLFC
- William Sefton Moorhouse, a New Zealand politician
- Graham Steadman, former York, Featherstone Rovers, Castleford and Great Britain rugby league footballer
- Professor Austin Tate, professor of Knowledge-Based Systems at the University of Edinburgh
- Ben Thompson, former marshal of Austin, Texas; gambler and gunman in frontier Texas and Kansas of the United States
- Billy Thompson, a gunman and gambler in the American West, and younger brother of Ben.

== See also ==
- Listed buildings in Knottingley and Ferrybridge
