= Allied Glass =

Glassmaker based in Yorkshire, England

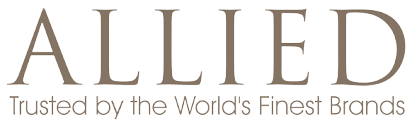
- Industry: Glass bottle production
- Founded: 1874
- Headquarters: Leeds, West Yorkshire, England
- Key people: Alan Henderson, CEO
- Website: www.allied-glass.com

Allied Glass is a British manufacturer of glass for the drinks industry, based in Leeds, West Yorkshire.

== History ==
=== Ownership ===
The company had a management buyout on 16 December 2002, funded by Close Brothers Group. In August 2010, the company was bought by Barclays Private Equity (now Equistone Partners Europe). In September 2019, the company was put on the market by Close Brothers Group (CBPE). In early January 2020, the company was bought by a private equity company. In November 2022, Allied Glass was sold to the Verallia Group of glassmakers, which are based in France.

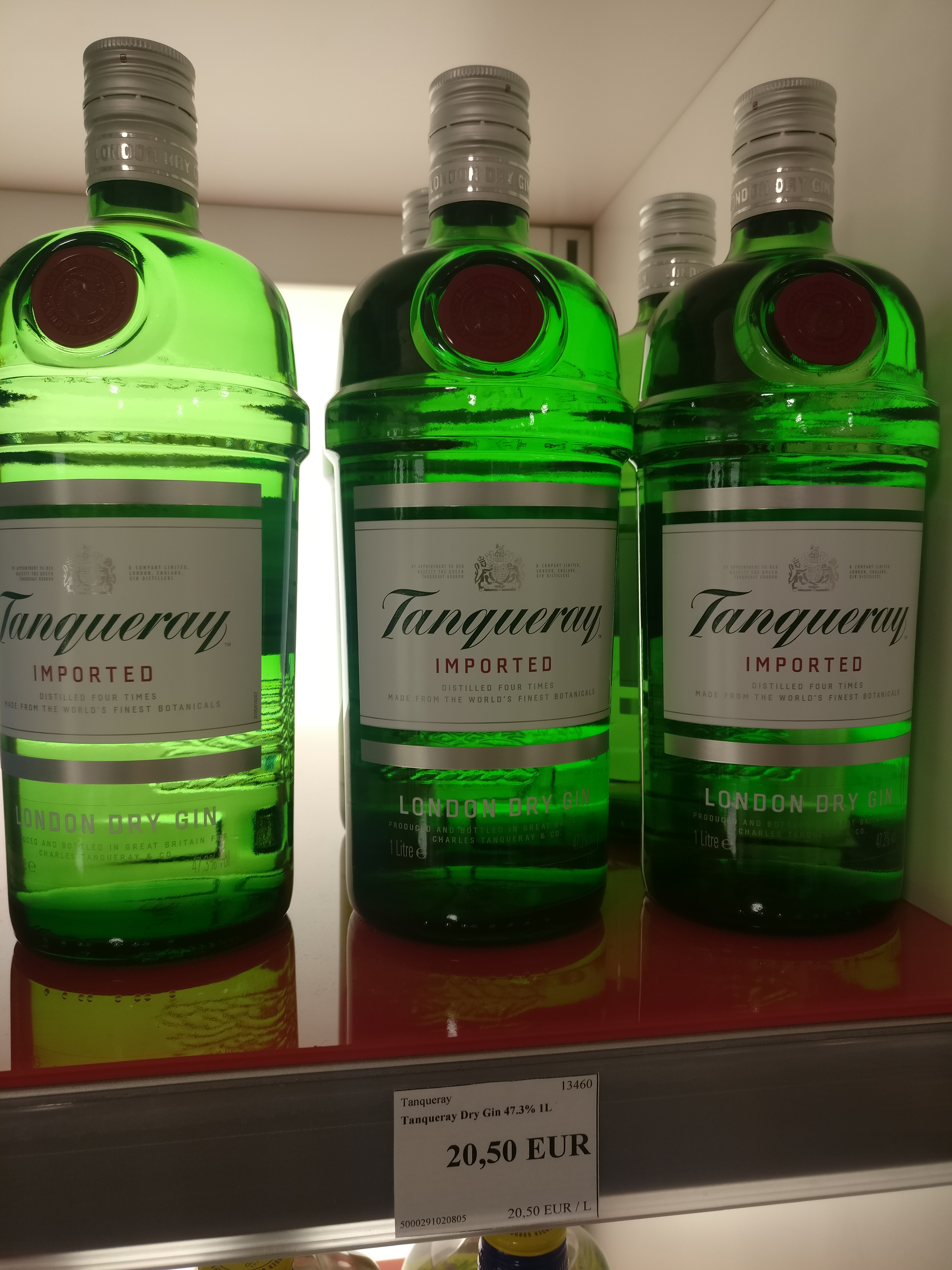
Allied Glass makes the bottles for Diageo's Tanqueray No. 10., the world's best-selling gin

== Structure ==
Allied Glass Containers' headquarters are in West Yorkshire. The company has around 600 employees.

== Products ==
Most of the bottles that it manufactures are for the UK spirits industry, around 60% of which is for whisky. mainly Scotch whisky, such as for Diageo. It also makes bottles for the mineral water industry. It produces around 600 million bottles per year.

== See also ==
- Ardagh Group, manufacture glass in South Yorkshire (Doncaster)
- Encirc Glass in north-west Cheshire
- Stölzle Glass, also nearby in West Yorkshire
- Scotch Whisky Association
