= De Lacy Academy =

Coordinates: 53°42′16.1″N 1°14′30.3″W

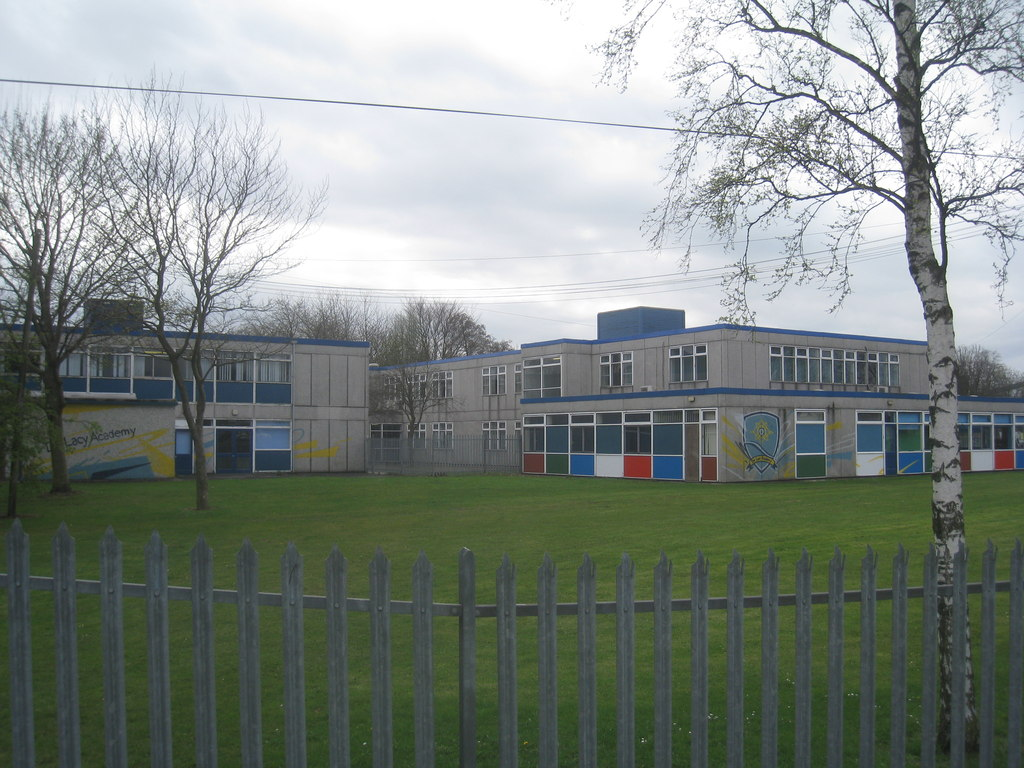
- The school in 2013

Location
- Middle Lane; Knottingley; City of Wakefield, West Yorkshire, WF11 0BZ; England

Information
- Type: Academy
- Local authority: Wakefield
- Trust: Delta Academies Trust
- Department for Education URN: 138006 Tables
- Ofsted: Reports
- Principal: Richard Fieldhouse
- Gender: Mixed
- Age: 11 to 16
- Twitter: @DeLacyAcademy
- Website: www.delacyacademy.org.uk

De Lacy Academy, formerly Knottingley High School, is a mixed secondary school in Knottingley in the City of Wakefield, West Yorkshire, England.

Previously a community school administered by Wakefield Council, Knottingley High School converted to academy status in April 2012 and was renamed De Lacy Academy. The school is part of Delta Academies Trust, but continues to coordinate with Wakefield Council for admissions.

In April 2022, De Lacy Academy achieved an Ofsted rating of outstanding.

The current principal is Richard Fieldhouse. The previous head was Helen O'Brien, who was appointed in 2023; she took over from Chris McCall.

De Lacy Academy offers GCSEs and BTECs as programmes of study for pupils.
