= St Botolph's Church, Knottingley =

Anglican church in Knottingley, West Yorkshire, England

- Church of St Botolph
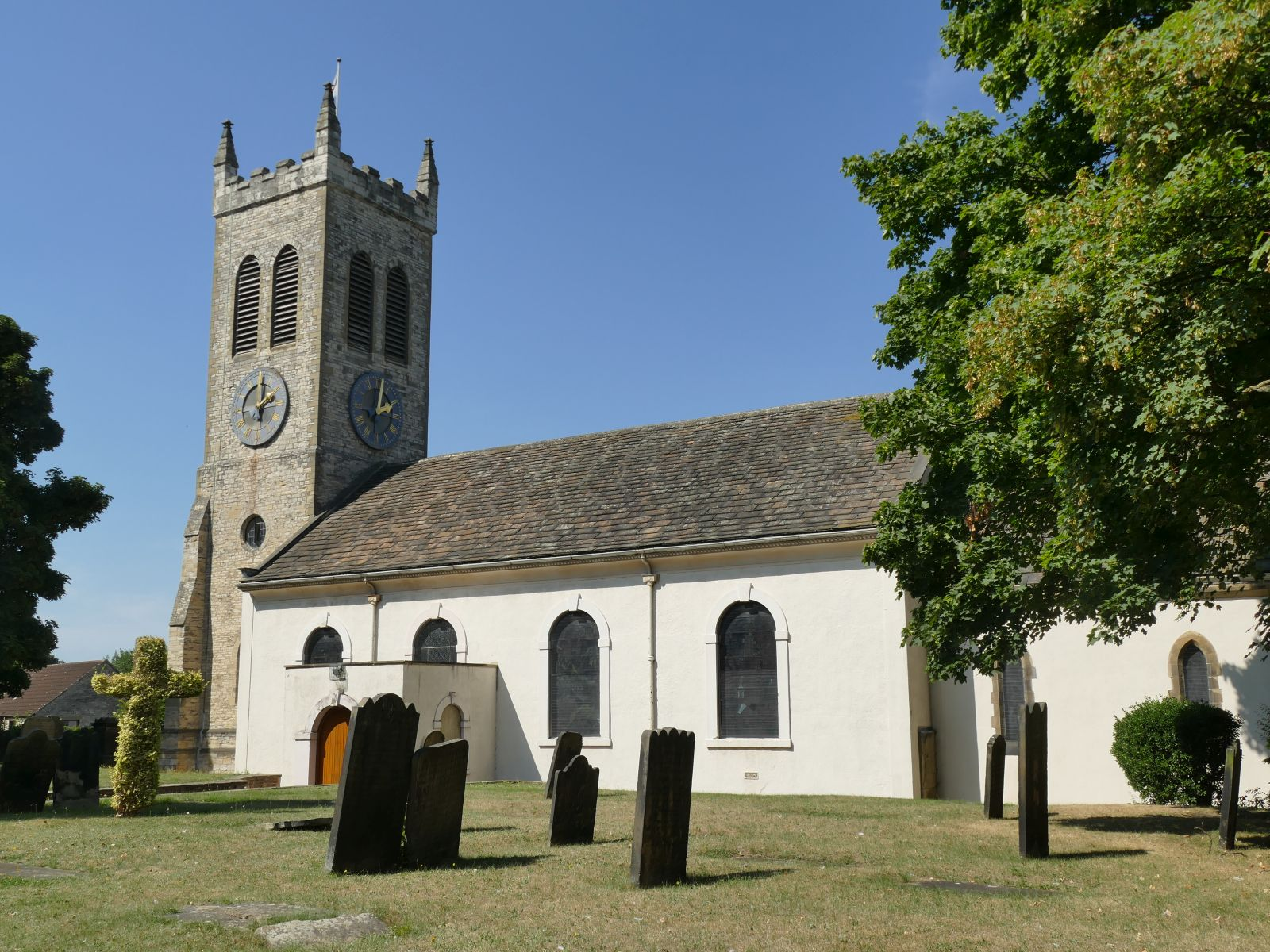
- St Botolph's Church, Knottingley
- 53.710°N 1.244°W
- OS grid reference: SE 49978 24100
- Location: Knottingley, West Yorkshire
- Country: England
- Denomination: Church of England

History
- Status: Parish Church

Architecture
- Heritage designation: Grade II listed building
- Completed: 1888

Specifications
- Materials: Magnesian limestone

Administration
- Province: York

The Church of St Botolph is an active Anglican parish church in the town of Knottingley, West Yorkshire, England. It is in the archdeaconry of York and the Diocese of Leeds. The church is named after St. Botolph and is a grade II listed building.

== History ==
=== Earlier structures ===
Although there are no records of such a chapel in Domesday Book it is believed a chapel of Saxon origin did stand on the site. A church of Norman origin is documented having been built between 1119 and 1121, built on the patronage of Robert de Lacy and the Monks of Pontefract.

=== Present structure ===
This church was rebuilt in the between 1750 and 1756; initially with the nave and chancel being rebuilt. The west tower was constructed in 1873, and the chancel was again rebuilt in 1886, with an upstairs gallery being added for an enlarged congregation. In 1888, the church was again remodelled with the galleries being removed and the addition of new windows. In 1995 the tower was renovated and the outside staircase replaced with an internal spiral staircase.

== Architecture ==
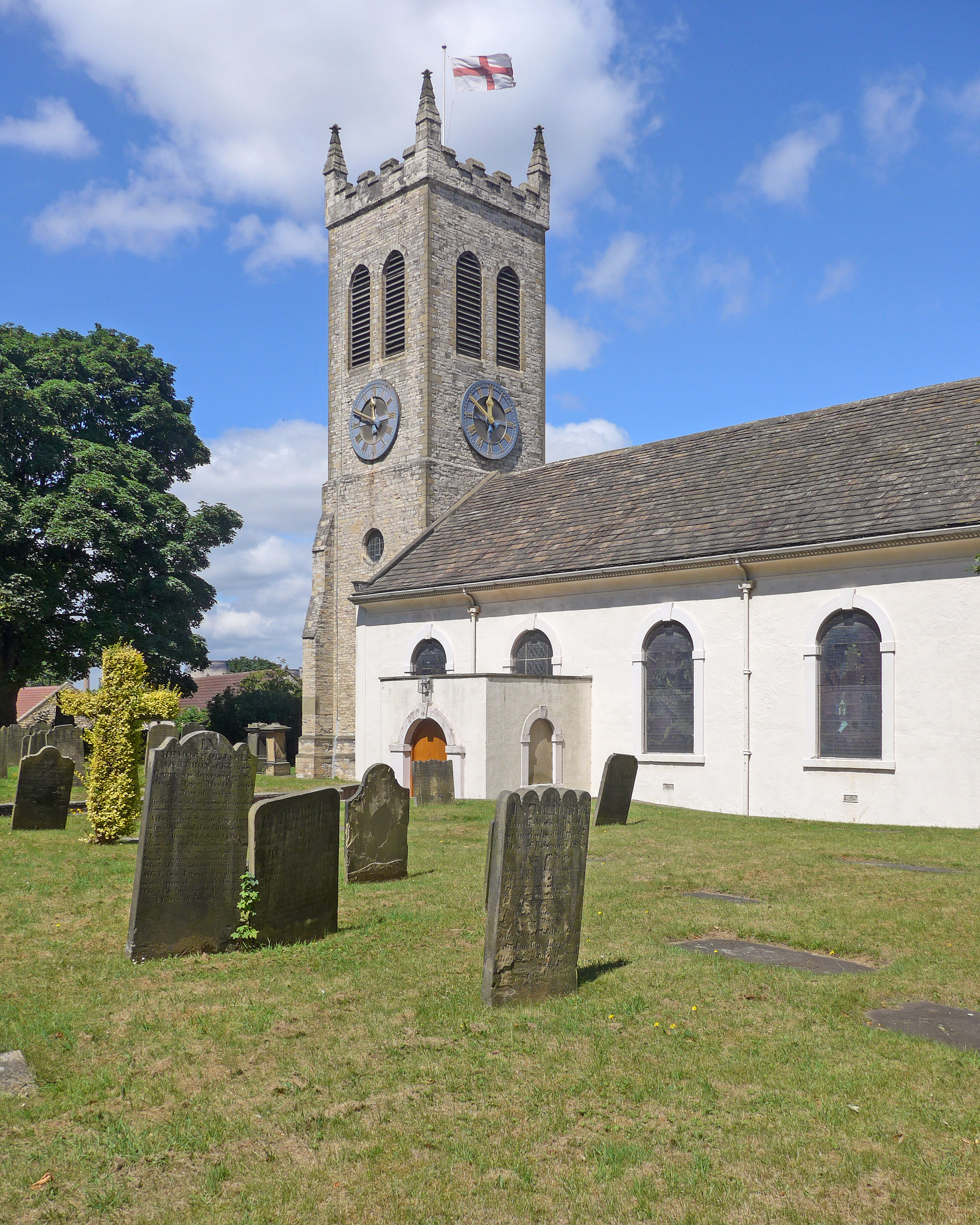
The tower and the rendered nave.

The church is of magnesian limestone construction with both the chancel and nave having been rendered. The pitched roof is tiled in slate. The nave has four bays and is of a simple classical style. The tower has four stages with angled buttresses. The first stage has a single lancet window on each side and a circular window in the second. The third face has a clock face and the fourth stage has louvred lancets in the belfry. The tower has a flag pole.

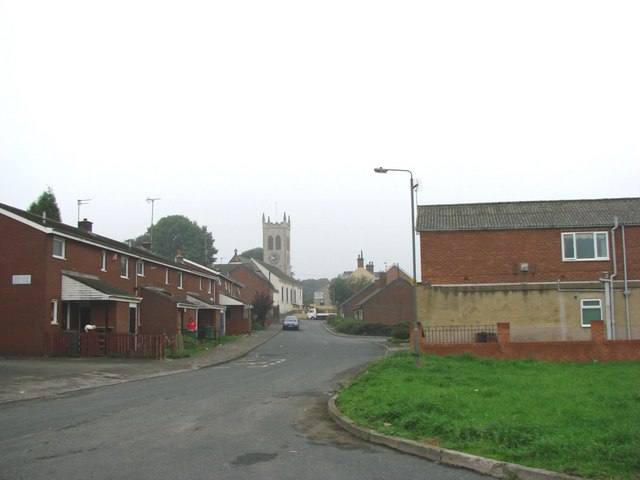
The church seen in the surrounding residential area

== See also ==
- List of places of worship in the City of Wakefield
- Listed buildings in Knottingley and Ferrybridge
