= Micklegate Methodist Church, Pontefract =

Methodist church in West Yorkshire, England

Micklegate Methodist Church
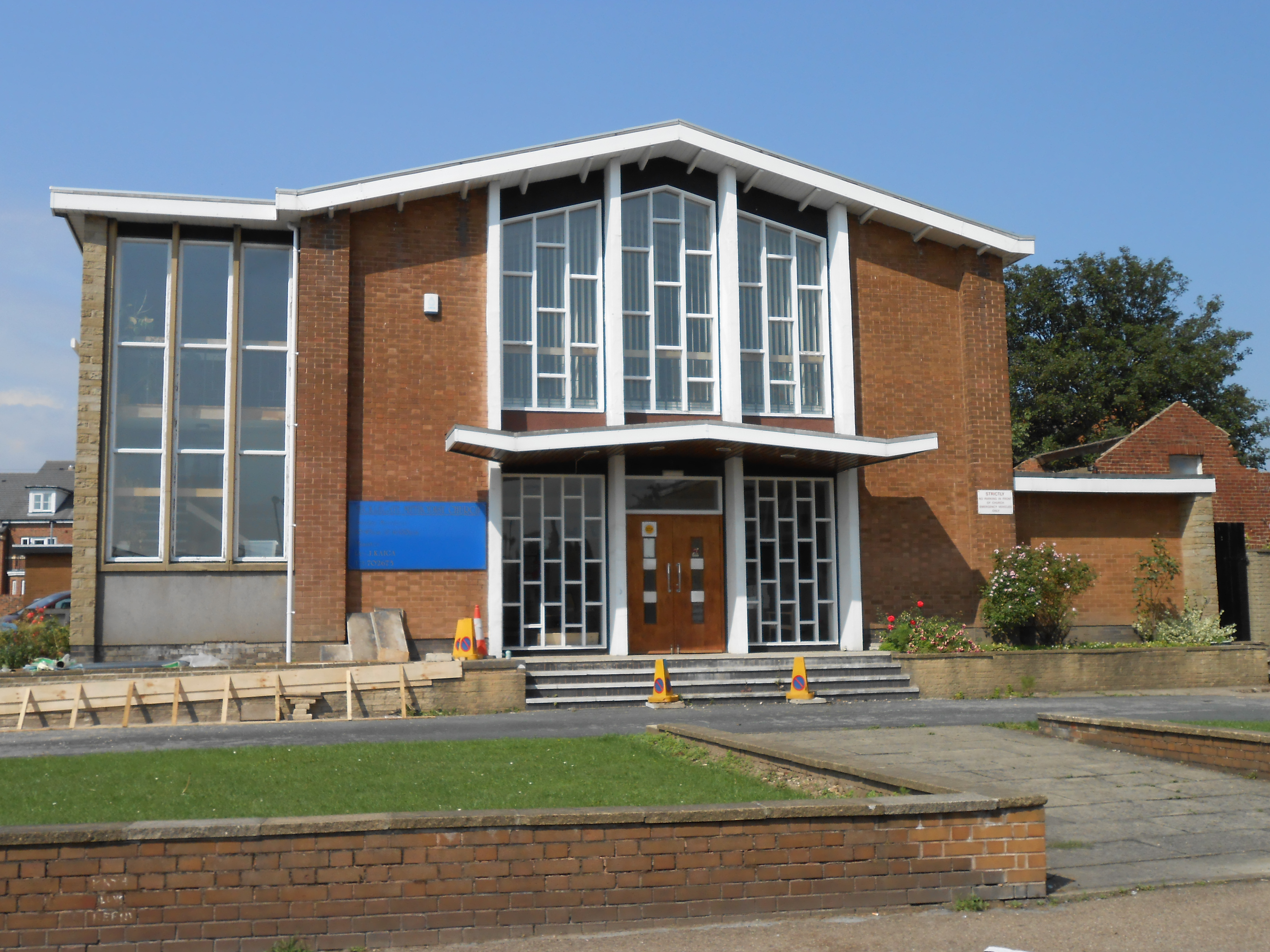
- Micklegate Methodist Church
- Micklegate Methodist Church
- 53.694°N 1.305°W
- OS grid reference: SE4595322180
- Location: Micklegate, Pontefract, West Yorkshire
- Country: England
- Denomination: Methodist Church of Great Britain

Micklegate Methodist Church is a former Methodist Church of Great Britain church in Pontefract, West Yorkshire, England.

== Location ==
The church is situated on Micklegate to the east of Pontefract town centre close to Pontefract Castle. It is one of two Methodist churches in the town, the other being Central Methodist Church situated to the west of Pontefract town centre.

== History ==
The church replaced the former Tanshelf Primitive Methoduct Church which burned down in 1965. There are records of Methodist churches on this site since 1854. The current church was opened 8 September 1969. It was closed in August 2024.

=== Tanshelf Primitive Methoduct Church ===
Tanshelf Primitive Methoduct Church stood on the current site of Micklegate Methodist Church. The church was two storey and of red brick construction with a gabled front. It was of 19th century origin. The church was burned down in an arson attack in which nobody was injured.

== Architecture ==
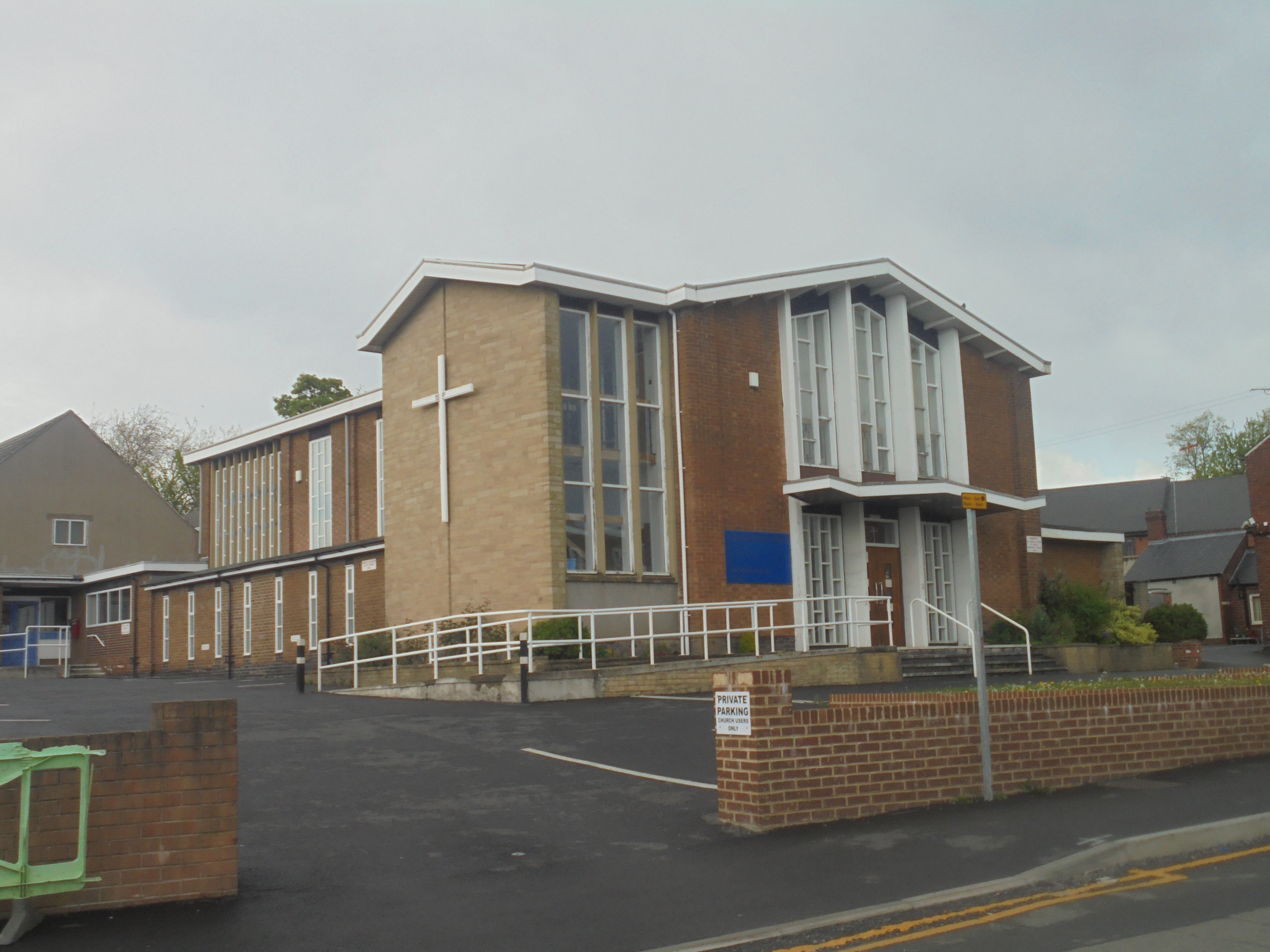
The southern and western facades

The church is of a modernist style. It is two stories high with a gabled south facing front with extensive glazing, double doors and canopy. The western facia features a large crucifix.

== War memorial ==
Inside the church is a war memorial to the First World War which was salvaged from the former Tanshelf Primitive Methodist Church which reads 'Great War 1914 – 1919, in tender loving memory of Cpl JL Harvey, J Walker, Gunr F Wilson, W Boothman, Pte GE Spurr, JW Paver, Pte EA Ogly, SS Trueman, Pte E Moxon, WS Heseltine, Pte GR Beaumont, Pte C Turner, H Crabtree, Pte E Garner, TW Crewe, Pte D Leng, C Cotton, Pte JW Lister, JH Heeley, Drir GH Waller, Men of Pontefract and Tanshelf Prim Meth Church who made the supreme sacrifice'.
