= Tom Askin =

English rugby league player (1905–1976)

Personal information
- Full name: Thomas C. Askin
- Born: 24 June 1905 Knottingley, Wakefield, England
- Died: 14 January 1976 (aged 70)

Playing information
- Height: 5 ft 8 in (1.73 m)
- Weight: 11 st 2 lb (71 kg)
- Position: Wing, Centre
Club
Years	Team	Pld	T	G	FG	P
1925–29	Featherstone Rovers	130	45	1	0	137
1929–30	Leeds	42	17	0	0	51
1930–39	Castleford	196	64	0	0	192
1937	→ Newcastle RLFC (loan)	1	0	0	0	0
1938–39	→ Featherstone Rovers (loan)	12	0	0	0	0
	Total	381	126	1	0	380
Representative
Years	Team	Pld	T	G	FG	P
1927–29	Yorkshire	≥4
1928	Great Britain	6	1	0	0	3
- Relatives: Ambrose Askin (brother)

Thomas C. Askin (24 June 1905 – 14 January 1976) was an English professional rugby league footballer who played in the 1920s and 1930s. He played at representative level for Great Britain and Yorkshire, and at club level for Featherstone Rovers, Leeds, Castleford and Newcastle. He usually played as a wing or centre.

== Background ==
Tom Askin was born in Knottingley, Wakefield, West Riding of Yorkshire, England.

== Playing career ==
=== Club career ===
Tom Askin, who came from Knottingley, made his début for Featherstone Rovers on 21 March 1925, after the club had spotted him playing for Knottingley Rovers. He was suspended from playing for three matches in early 1927 following an ill-tempered December game against Wakefield Trinity in which he and three other players were sent off. He played at centre in Featherstone Rovers' 0-5 defeat by Leeds in the 1928 Yorkshire Cup final at Belle Vue, Wakefield, on 24 November 1928.

Soon after this, and hours before the midnight, 1 February 1929 cut-off time for players to be registered for the Rugby League Cup, Askin was transferred to Leeds. This was despite both clubs only days earlier scotching rumours of such a transfer, and despite rumoured interest in him from other clubs such as Oldham, Salford and Halifax. Although he had recovered from a leg injury, (Note: Askin had twisted his knee at the start of October in his first match for Featherstone after returning from the 1928 Great Britain tour of Australasia. He then injured himself again in a County match against Lancashire, without having played for Featherstone in the intervening period.) the 12-stone, 22-year-old Askin had not played for Featherstone for a few weeks due to a disagreement with the club's board, and they now felt that they had no option but to list him. Featherstone had wanted £1000 for the player but accepted Leeds' offer of £800.

Askin played for his new club against Hull F.C. on 2 February and then injured his leg during Leeds' defeat by Warrington in the first round of the Cup a week later. He had to have an operation in Liverpool and was out of the team for almost all that remained of the 1928–29 season. Although signed by Leeds to strengthen their left wing, he returned to his more familiar position in the centre for the 1929–30 season and scored 15 tries before being put on the transfer market with an asking price of £500.

Askin transferred to Castleford on 13 November 1930, with The Leeds Mercury commenting that he had "rarely touched his best form in Leeds colours and it may be that now he is nearer the district in which he learned his football he will display the ability which gained him a place in the last tour team". He played for the club from then until the 1936–37 season, scoring his first try for the club in the 22-3 victory over Bramley in very bad conditions on 29 November 1930. He was joined at Castleford by his brother, Ambrose, who made his début against Hull F.C. on 26 March 1932, a match in which Tom was unable to play due to injury.

Tom Askin was listed for transfer by Castleford at a fee of £250 in July 1932. However, he was a part of the Castleford team that won the Yorkshire County League during the 1932–33 season. He played on the wing and scored a try in Castleford's 11-8 victory over Huddersfield in the 1935 Challenge Cup final at Wembley Stadium, London, on 4 May 1935, in front of a crowd of 39,000. Later that year, in November, he broke his leg in the last minutes of a match against the same club. Although there were fears that the injury might signal the end of his career, he appeared to be training well in the subsequent close season.

In March 1937, an exchange deal between Castleford and Newcastle saw Askin move to North East England while G. L. Taylor travelled in the opposite direction. Newcastle were at that time attempting to establish the sport in the Tyneside region and the Yorkshire Evening Post commented that his loyalty and experience could be of much benefit in that regard.

In September 1938, Askin returned to Featherstone on loan from Castleford.

=== International and County honours ===
Askin won caps for Great Britain in 1928, when he played three matches against Australia and a further three against New Zealand.

Askin won caps for Yorkshire during the 1927–28 season against Cumberland, Lancashire, and Glamorgan and Monmouthshire. (Note: Askin suffered an eye injury during the September 1927 match against Glamorgan and Monmouthshire. This resulted in him being hospitalised after playing about a quarter of the game.) He played again for the county during the 1928–29 season against Lancashire. In September 1930, he played once more for Yorkshire against Cumberland at Whitehaven when George Whittaker of Swinton was moved from the wing to cover for the injured Castleford international Arthur Atkinson, thus opening up a spot for Askin. However, he was dropped from the squad in favour of George Bateman of Hull for the October match against Lancashire at Belle Vue, Wakefield.

In 1971, Askin, then involved with Doncaster, was appointed as a replacement for Brian Snape on the RFL selection panel.

== Personal life ==
Askin married Aubuary Stephenson of Whitley Bridge at Kellington Parish Church on 16 August 1933. He was elected to Knottingley council as an Independent Municipal Association candidate in May 1954.

== See also ==
- List of Featherstone Rovers players
