= Jack Smith =

Jack Smith may refer to:

== Sport ==
=== Association football ===
- Jack Smith (Port Vale), footballer in 1892–1895
- Jack Smith (footballer, born 1882) (1882 – after 1911), English player with Wolverhampton Wanderers and others
- Jack Smith (footballer, born 1895) (1895–1946), Scottish player with Bolton Wanderers
- Jack Smith (footballer, born 1898) (1898–1977), English international footballer
- Jack Smith (Bury footballer) (fl. 1929-1931), English footballer (goalkeeper), see List of Bury F.C. players (1–24 appearances)
- Jack Smith (footballer, born 1901), English footballer for Bradford City and Blackburn Rovers, also known as John Smith
- Jack Smith (footballer, born 1910) (1910–1986), English player with Sheffield United
- Jack Smith (footballer, born 1911) (1911–1975), Welsh player with Wolves; manager of West Bromwich Albion and Reading
- Jack Smith (footballer, born 1915) (1915–1975), English player with Manchester United
- Jack Smith (footballer, born 1936) (1936–2008), English player with Swindon Town
- Jack Smith (footballer, born 1983), English player
- Jack Smith (footballer, born 1994), Scottish player
- Jack Smith (footballer, born 2001), English player
- Jack Smith (Australian footballer, born 1881) (1881–1927), Australian rules footballer for North Melbourne and Melbourne
- Jack Smith (Australian footballer, born 1909) (1909–1983), Australian rules footballer for St Kilda and North Melbourne
- Jack Smith (Gaelic footballer), Westmeath player
- Jack Smith (end) (1917–2015), American football end
- Jack Smith (defensive back) (born 1947), American football player

=== Auto racing ===
- Jack Smith (American racing driver, born 1924) (1924–2001), American NASCAR driver
- Jack Smith (American racing driver, born 1973), American NASCAR driver
- Jack Smith (Australian racing driver) (born 1999), Australian racing driver

=== Baseball ===
- Jack Smith (outfielder) (1895–1972), Major League Baseball player
- Jack Smith (pitcher) (1935–2021), Major League Baseball player
- Jack Smith (third baseman) (1893–1962), Major League Baseball player

=== Other sports ===
- Jack Smith (sportsman) (1936–2020), English cricketer and rugby union player
- Jack Smith (Australian cricketer) (born 1977), Australian cricketer
- Jack Smith (coach), American college football, baseball and basketball coach for Hofstra
- Jack Smith (speedway rider) (born 1998), British speedway rider
- Jack Smith (wheelchair rugby) (born 1991), British Paralympian
- Jack Smith (rugby league, New Zealand)
- Jack Smith (rugby league), English rugby league footballer

== Arts and entertainment ==
- Whispering Jack Smith (1896–1950), American musician
- Jack Martin Smith (1911–1993), Hollywood art director
- Smilin' Jack Smith (1913–2006), American crooner, radio/television host, and actor
- John O'Neill (musician, born 1926) (1926–1999), English musician credited as Whistling Jack Smith
- Jack Smith (film director) (1932–1989), American underground film director
- John F. Smith (writer), American soap opera writer
- Jack Thomas Smith (born 1969), American producer, writer and director

== Other fields ==
- John Henry Smith (1881–1953), Australian politician
- Jack W. Smith (1882/83–?), British trade union activist
- Jack Smith (politician) (1901–1967), Liberal party member of the Canadian House of Commons
- Jack Carington Smith (1908–1972), Australian artist
- Jack Smith (columnist) (1916–1996), Los Angeles journalist
- Jack Smith (artist) (1928–2011), British abstract artist
- John F. Smith Jr. (born 1938), American business executive, CEO of General Motors
- Jack Smith (Hotmail), co-founder of Hotmail
- Jack Smith (lawyer) (born 1969), American lawyer, special counsel for the Department of Justice

== Fictional characters ==
- Jack Smith (American Dad!), in the American animated TV series American Dad!

== See also ==
- John Smith (disambiguation)
- Jackie Smith (disambiguation)
- Stingy Jack (also known as Jack the Smith), a mythical character associated with All Hallows' Eve
