= Jackie Smith (disambiguation) =

Jackie Smith (born 1940) is an American football player.

Jackie Smith may also refer to:

- Jackie Smith (sociologist) (born 1968), American sociologist
- Jackie Smith (footballer) (1883–1916), English footballer
- Jackie Smith (softball) (born 1969), New Zealand softball player
- Jackie Smith (politician) (born 1956), Iowa state senator

== See also ==
- Jacqui Smith (born 1962), politician
- Jackie Smith-Wood (born 1954), British actress
- Jacqueline Smith (disambiguation)
- Jack Smith (disambiguation)
- John Smith (disambiguation)
