= Jacqueline Smith =

Jacqueline Smith may refer to:

- Jacqui Smith (birth name Jacqueline Jill Smith; born 1962), British politician
- Jacqueline Smith (activist), American civil rights activist
- Jacqueline Smith (trade unionist) (born 1971), Norwegian trade unionist
- Jaclyn Smith (birth name Jacquelyn Ellen Smith; born 1945), actress

== See also ==
- Jackie Smith (disambiguation)
