= Dick Smith (rugby league) =

NZ international rugby league player

Personal information
- Full name: Walton Victor Roy Smith
- Born: 26 July 1911 Devonport, Auckland, New Zealand
- Died: 2 July 1964 (aged 52) Auckland, New Zealand

Playing information
- Position: Stand-off, Wing, Fullback
Club
Years	Team	Pld	T	G	FG	P
1929–35	Devonport United	48	24	51	1	176
1931	Devonport-Marist	1	0	0	0	0
1936	Newton Rangers	10	3	0	0	9
1938–41	North Shore Albions	16	2	18	0	42
	Total	75	29	69	1	227
Representative
Years	Team	Pld	T	G	FG	P
1931–32	Auckland	2	1	4	0	11
1931	Auckland Colts	1	0	2	0	4
1932	New Zealand Trial	2	2	2	0	10
1932	New Zealand	1	0	0	0	0
1932	New Zealand XIII	1	0	0	0	0
- Relatives: George W Smith (uncle); Jack Smith (brother)

Dick Smith was a rugby league player who represented New Zealand in one test match in 1932 against England on the wing. In the process he became the 218th player to represent New Zealand. He also played rugby league for Auckland. He was a member of the North Shore Albions (also named Devonport United), and the Newton Rangers clubs. His brother was Jack Smith, the New Zealand rugby league representative of the late 1930s, they were both the nephews of the well known sportsman of the 1890s-1910s George Smith.

== Early life ==
Dick Smith was born Walton Victor Roy Smith but later became known as Dick with his initials often being recorded as "R. Smith" and "R.W. Smith" in team lists and match reports throughout his career. He was born on 26 July 1911, to Walton Smith and Clara Evelyn Smith (née Green). He had an older brother named Richard Frederick Smith born in 1909, and a younger brother Charles Ernest Smith born in 1918, though Charles was better known as Jack Smith. Jack also went on to play for New Zealand in 1938 and 1939. Their uncle (Walton's brother) was George Smith, the famous sportsman who represented New Zealand in rugby union, rugby league, as well as winning the New Zealand Cup as a jockey. The family lived on Auckland’s North Shore at Devonport.

== Cricket ==
In 1925 Dick was playing for the North Shore 4th grade cricket side. He was awarded the "T. Eyres bat" for the "highest batting in the fourth grade" at the clubs annual awards. He progressed through the grades playing for the 3rd grade side by 1928 and in 1929 he was promoted to the North Shore senior B side aged 18 and was then chosen for the Auckland Colts for a tour of the South Island. In his side was future first class cricketer Trevor Lyon, and New Zealand Test cricketer Giff Vivian. He only managed 1 run in a match with an Otago side on 25 December. Smith scored 10 runs and took a catch in their match with Southland on 29 December. On 1 January he scored 34 at Oamaru against a North Otago side. It was said that he "did not get into his stride for some time, but hit hard for his 34". He also took a catch and a wicket as Auckland went on to win the match on the second day. On the 3rd against South Canterbury at Timaru, "Smith came to the crease [with Auckland 98/6] and played brightly,...the rest went easily with the exception of Smith, who was undefeated" on 43 at the end of Auckland's innings of 151. Auckland was bowled out for 125 in their second innings with Smith again not out on 7. In their final tour match against Ashburton on 7–8 January he scored 22 in a draw. He had been promoted up the order to bat at 5, after spending most of the tour at 7 or 8. After returning from the tour on 25 January he made his senior club debut for North Shore against United Suburbs. It was reported that "Bush and R. Smith brightened the outlook. The latter, a promoted colt, was eventually bowled when attempting to put Horspool out of the ground". On 29 March he scored 100 in a game against Eden while batting at number 4. The Auckland Star said "the cricket was brighter than has been seen for some time past at Devonport, and this fact was in great measure due to the innings of R. Smith, who carried his bat for 100 dead. This was his first century in big cricket, and, although his innings was not chance less, he deserves high praise for his sparkling display. At no time was his batting dull, and his crisp well-timed strokes sent the ball to the boundary on fifteen occasions. more at home to the slow stuff stuff than to the faster variety of bowling, Smith thrived on leg deliveries, although his off shots were at times brilliant. With coaching he should develop into a batsman of more than ordinary ability". After a handful of low scores to start the following season he was dropped to the B team and seemingly played no further cricket for North Shore.

== Rugby league playing career ==
=== Devonport United and Auckland debut ===
In 1929 Dick Smith was playing for the Devonport United rugby league fourth grade side. Devonport had formerly been known as North Shore Albions, which was the name they would revert to later in the 1930s. His fourth grade side went undefeated for the season, winning all 16 matches and scoring 352 points and only conceding 23. Smith was the captain of the side and received the cup on behalf of the team at Devonport's prize giving. He likely debuted for the side the same season in a Roope Rooster loss to Richmond where it was said that Smith, a promoted junior had a torrid time of it at fullback and must strengthen his tackling. At the end of the season a small piece was written saying that Smith was welcomed back to the Devonport 4th Grade football (soccer) side. It also stated that he had scored 133 points for his rugby league team during the year. He had apparently registered the highest goal count for the Devonport sixth grade team a couple of seasons earlier.

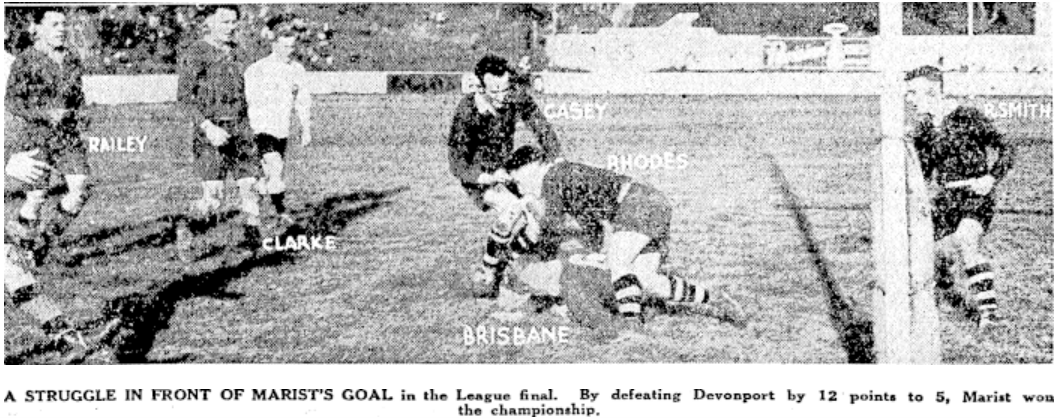
Dick Smith to the right of the posts defending for Devonport in their 12-5 loss to Marist which decided the 1931 championship. The tackled player is Hec Brisbane.

Smith began the 1931 season in the Devonport reserve grade side. His debut in the senior side was on 11 July against Richmond Rovers in a round 11 match at Carlaw Park. Devonport won the game 14-10 with Smith scoring a try. The New Zealand Herald said "R. Smith, a reserve grade player, was given a trial at centre. His promise in this position was one of the features of the game. Smith is a tricky and clever player with a natural side-step which left tacklers frequently grabbing the air. He was inclined to go a little too far at times when in possession". His try came when Allan Seagar "made a brilliant opening and [he] followed him through and scored a fine try by the posts". Smith contributed a lot of Devonport's points over the remainder of the season. He scored tries in matches with Ellerslie-Otahuhu, Newton Rangers, Ponsonby United, and Marist Old Boys, as well as kicking several goals. He finished the season with 57 points from just 9 games making him the 4th highest points scorer in Auckland for the 1931 season. In the Roope Rooster final against Ponsonby on 19 September it was said that Smith along with Seagar "dazzled with their side-stepping and incisive tactical moves which invariably threw the defence awry". Later in the match in which he also kicked 5 goals "Smith paralysed his opponents with two sparking tries".

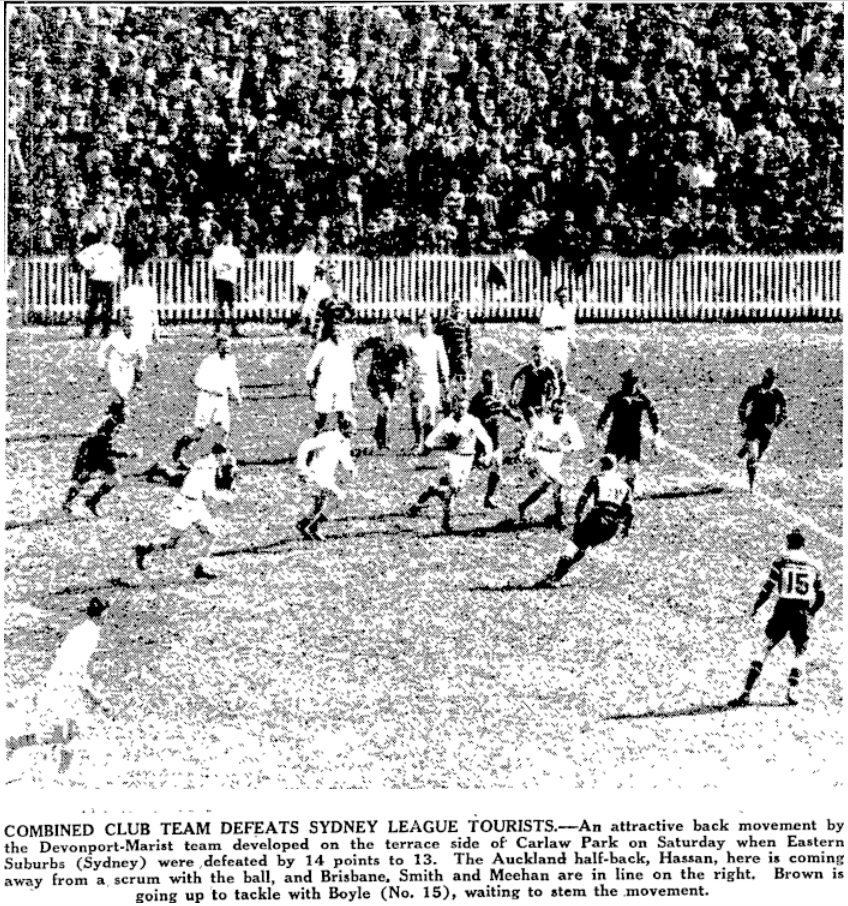

The Herald writer said that "it was a pity the selectors did not give Smith an opportunity of playing as five-eighths with Davidson and List for Auckland against Northland". However Smith was ultimately named in the side at five eighths along with Dunn from Richmond. The match for the Northern Union Challenge Cup was played at Carlaw Park on 26 September. The game finished 19-19. Smith missed the conversion for Auckland's first try, but a while latter picked up a loose ball and sent Pat Meehan in for a try. He missed another conversion but in another attack set Meehan free again for another try.

Smith's next match was in the Stormont Shield final against Marist Old Boys which Devonport won 25–6 with Smith scoring 2 tries. Then Devonport had the opportunity to play Eastern Suburbs who were touring Auckland. On 10 October they played at Carlaw Park before an enormous crowd of 17,000. Smith scored a try and kicked 6 goals however Devonport still went down 41-27. A week later on 17 October Smith played in a combined Devonport-Marist side against Eastern Suburbs and won 14–13. Smith then played the tourists for the third time on 21 October as part of an Auckland Colts side. The colts lost 18–13 with Smith kicking a conversion and a penalty.

The 1932 season saw Smith again playing at five eighth for Devonport and in 13 games he scored 54 points through 6 tries and 18 goals. He was the 3rd highest scorer behind Frank Delgrosso and Alan Clarke. He kicked a conversion and penalty in their round 9 win over Marist 7 points to 5 which secured the Fox Memorial title with a round to spare.

=== New Zealand selection ===
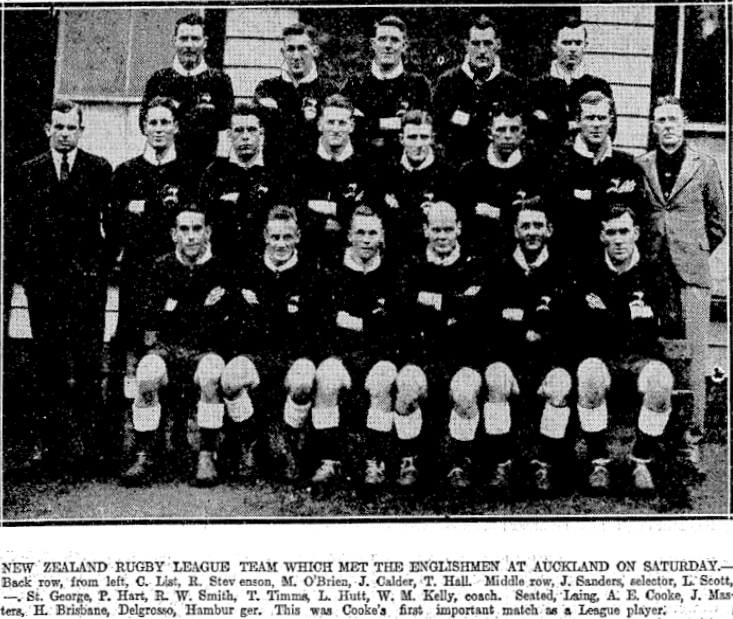

In mid July Smith was chosen in a trial match to assist with the selection of the New Zealand team to play the touring England side. The trial was a curtain-raiser to the Auckland match with South Auckland on 16 July. Smith played for the Probables side which beat the Possibles 26 to 12 and he scored a try. He picked up the ball around halfway and "cut in nicely to outpace Delgrosso and score a nice try". The Auckland Star said "the Shore colt, R.W. Smith played his best game this season, but is still inclined to selfishness". A week later he played in a second New Zealand trial match which was curtain-raiser to the North Island v South Island game. Smith was on the Probables team again but this time they lost 37 to 16 though he did manage a try and 2 conversions for the losing side. Following the inter-island match and trial game the New Zealand team was named with Smith in the reserves for the first test by the selectors (Thomas McClymont, Archie Ferguson, and Jim Sanders). It was said that he "gained precedence over Prentice". It was then reported that P. Hart from the West Coast had not been able to recover from a leg injury that he sustained in the Inter-island match and so Smith replaced him in the starting side at wing.

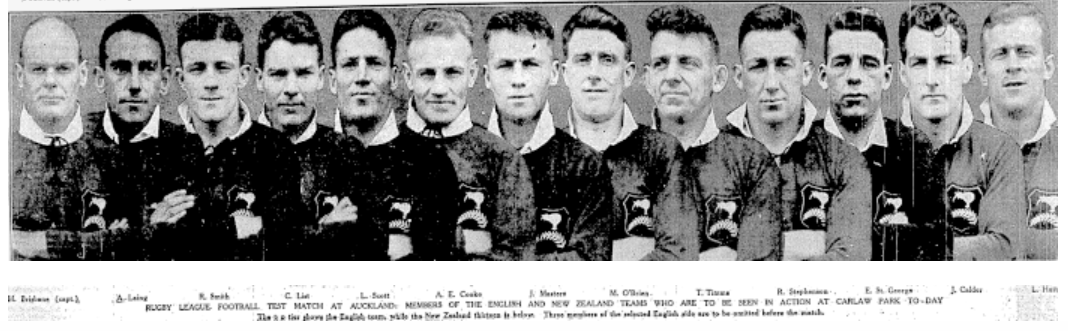

Unfortunately for Smith he was playing in a position that he had spent very little time in. The test was played at Carlaw Park before a crowd of 25,000 and saw New Zealand comprehensively outplayed, losing 24-9. New Zealand won very little scrum ball and the backs were starved of possession. Smith and Len Scott on the other wing "never saw the ball in orthodox attack. That was not their fault, but in individual effort neither ... was up to the standard that one expects in big league football". With New Zealand trailing 6-4 Smith was involved in an attack with Bert Cooke and Lou Hutt but Cooke's kick ahead saw the ball roll into touch a foot from the try line with Hutt and Smith the only players on hand. Then in the second half with England leading 11-9 Smith tackled Alf Ellaby with England threatening. England's final try came after "weak play by Laing and Smith gave England another try". The defence of Smith who was playing out of his regular position was also questioned along with that of his Devonport teammates Len Scott and Albert Laing "for neither our wingers nor the full-back were equal to the occasion. Scott, who was expected to make the "come back" he made against Parkin’s side in 1928, showed no initiative and Smith, well, he wilted. It was too grave a risk with both of these players, one of whom had made no pretense to being a wing three-quarter (Smith)...". For the second test all three were dropped and replaced by Steve Watene, Bert Cooke (who was moving from five eighth), and Ben Davidson. New Zealand lost 25 to 14 in Christchurch.

Smith played in a round 10 loss for Devonport against City Rovers in the first grade championship which Devonport had already secured and was then named in a North Island side to play England in Wellington. The line up was then changed to include 3 South Island players and so the side essentially became a ‘New Zealand XIII’. Smith was chosen in an outside five eighth position alongside Edwin Abbott, with Wilf Hassan at half back. The New Zealand selection was thrashed 59-8 at the Basin Reserve in Wellington before a crowd of 4,000. They were unfortunate to lose captain Lou Hutt to a compound fracture of his thumb early in the match and had to play the remainder of the game with 12 players. Despite the poor showing by the side Smith was at least named in the reserves for the third test to be played back in Auckland.

Smith then finished his season playing in 2 losses for Devonport. The first was a Roope Rooster semi final loss for Devonport against Marist where he contributed 10 of his sides points in their 19-18 defeat. While the second was in a loss to the same opponent in the Stormont Shield final.

=== Devonport and Auckland again ===
The 1933 season was very injury disrupted for Smith. He only played in 9 of Devonport's 17 matches. The season began with the annual club meeting for Devonport at which Smith was presented with Mr. Kiely's gold medal for the most individual points scored in the senior side. Through 6 games of the season Smith had scored 4 tries and kicked 8 goals for a total of 28 points. He was then selected for the Auckland side to play Taranaki on 10 June. The match was played at Carlaw Park before 10,000 spectators who saw Auckland win 32-20. Smith scored Auckland's first try which he also converted. He kicked a further 3 conversions for a personal haul of 11 points. The Auckland Star noted that the Taranaki inside backs stood too deep, with the result "that when Auckland backs obtained possession they were able to get up speed before they met the defence, and enjoyed more room to work in than they should have been permitted. This suited a tricky player like Smith, who was able several times to cut in and find gaps". A week later in a match for Devonport against Marist Smith went off with an injured ankle. His injury occurred in a tackle and he was moved to fullback as a result before eventually leaving the field. Earlier in the match he had kicked a "great penalty goal ... from just inside half-way". The injury was more serious than first thought and he did not play again for 3 months when he turned out for Devonport in the Stormont Shield final against Richmond Rovers. Devonport had qualified for the match by winning the Fox Memorial title for the second consecutive year. It was revealed that Smith had broken "a small bone in his leg" and it was thought at the time that he "will not be available for the rest of the season". With Smith out injured and the first grade title on the line the Devonport coach Allan Seagar came out of retirement to play. It was reported 6 weeks after the injury that he was moving about on crutches. Despite the suggestion that he would miss the rest of the season he was named to play in a challenge round match against Newton on 26 August however he ultimately didn't take the field. Then on 6 September the New Zealand Herald reported that "R. Smith, the Devonport five eighths, who broke a bone in his leg during championship matches, has made a good recovery. He expects to play for his club against Richmond in the [Stormont Shield] champion of champions match on Saturday week". He kicked a conversion and a penalty in a 12–7 win to help Devonport claim their 3rd Stormont Shield title. It was said that he played "a fine game at five-eighths". The match had unofficially been meant to find a club opponent to play against the touring St George team who had finished runner up in the 1933 NSW RFL however ultimately they also played the losing Richmond side twice anyway. Devonport lost the match 19 to 8 before 9,000 spectators at Carlaw Park with Smith playing at five eighth.

It was mentioned at the start of the 1934 season that he would again be playing for Devonport if fit however he ultimately did not play a single game all season. Smith did however make a return to the Devonport side in 1935. In their first match of the season against Marist he kicked 4 goals in a 17–17 draw. In their round 3 match he had to leave the field injured. Then in round 4 against Newton Rangers Smith was described as "mediocre at fullback, and gave a colourless exposition. In the fading stages, however, he came into the play and was the means of forcing and scoring Shore's one and only try with credit". He only played in 3 more matches for Devonport with his last coming on 15 June about the halfway mark of the season.

=== Transfer to Newton Rangers ===
In 1936 Smith began playing for Newton Rangers across the Waitematā Harbour. He was listed in their squad for their round 4 match against Devonport however he did not play in the game. His transfer was granted on 27 May. In his first appearance against Richmond Rovers on 30 May he played on the wing but "did not have many chances". He finished the season having played 11 games and scored 3 tries though Newton finished last in the Fox Memorial championship.

=== Return to the North Shore ===
Smith did not play at all in the 1937 season, then in 1938 he returned to Devonport who had changed their name back to their original North Shore Albions which they had been prior to their merger with the Sunnyside club. The transfer of "W.V.R. Smith (Newton Rangers) to North Shore Albions" went through at the control board meeting of 13 April. North Shore was being coached by Bob Banham, who had been brought to Auckland from Australia by the Auckland Rugby League to help develop the game. Dick was also playing with his younger brother Jack Smith for the first time. Following their first match with Marist on 9 April the Herald reported "both the Smith brothers were associated in some nice play with the coach, and their play will be more effective once movements have been discussed with Banham".

In the middle of the season on 28 May Dick and Jack's father 'Walter' died suddenly. Neither of the brothers played in the North Shore side the following weekend where the team wore white armbands (Devonport wore all black jerseys). The Auckland Rugby League gave their sympathies to the family and Dick wrote a letter on behalf of the family thanking them. The brothers returned to play in 4 June and Dick ended the season having played 10 games, scoring 18 points. He spent the later part of the season playing at full back. His season finished prematurely after he was injured in a 9 July game against Richmond. It was said he was playing "well at fullback, particularly in the first half, when he made some fine saves". They had six players leave the field injured at various stages and played the second half with 11 men.

Smith had seemingly retired and did not play at all in 1939 or 1940. He did however come out of retirement in 1941. During the war years a large number of players had gone to fight overseas and many retired players, or players later in their careers turned out for sides to ensure they could continue. The Auckland Star reported that Jack Smith, who was away at an army training camp, had his place "taken at full-back by his brother, R. Smith, and there he gave good service". In "his first appearance at Carlaw Park for three years" he kicked 3 conversions and a penalty in a 23–3 win over Marist. He "played a sound game, both in defence and attack, and kicked with judgment considering the heavy state of the ground". Against Richmond a week later he "was a tower of strength at fullback". North Shore went on to win the championship for the 6th time in their history. Dick's final two appearances for North Shore were on 11 October in a 21-12 Phelan Shield semi final loss against Mount Albert United where he kicked 3 penalty goals. And then on 18 October in their 30-10 Stormont Shield final loss to Manukau where he kicked a conversion and a penalty. This was to be the last game that Smith played, retiring aged 30.

== Personal life ==
On 16 December 1931, Dick married Nancie Alice Edwards. Nancie was born in 1913 to Alice Frances George Edwards and William James Edwards His wife Nancie and he had a son on 18 March 1937, at "St Kilda, 239 Great North Road".

It was reported that on the night of 22 December 1936, Smith was found in an illegal gaming premises known as the Albert Club on Wyndham Street. The venue was raided by a large number of detectives and "29 men were arrested on gaming charges". "Walton Victor Roy Smith" was fined in court "£3 and costs". The judge had fined those who pleaded guilty and had a clean record £1 which indicated that Smith was not a first time offender.

Then in 1938 on 11 February Smith was 'caught' again in a "raid on a gambling school on the second floor of the Queen's Arcade on Friday night". There was a total of 28 arrests and "Walton Victor Roy Smith was fined £5 and costs" whilst most others were only fined £2 or £3 based on prior records.

On May 38, 1938, Dick's father Walton died suddenly. He was living at 50 Old Lake Road in Devonport at the time of his death. In his death notices his name was variously given as "Walter" and "Walton" with one stating that he was the "dearly beloved husband of Clara Evelyn Smith, and father of Fred, Dick and Jack, age 56 years. The funeral will leave the chapel of H. Morris Limited, at 11am. Monday for O'Neill's Point Cemetery" at Bayswater. The Auckland Star published an obituary for him which stated "the death occurred at Devonport this morning of Mr. Walter Smith, a well known resident, and father of R. Smith and J. Smith, two well known North Shore Rugby League players, the latter being the full back chosen for the New Zealand League team to tour Australia. Mr. Smith was a brother of George Smith, the former well known Auckland footballer, who was a member of the original All Black team which toured Britain and Canada".

On 22 December 1940, Dick's older brother Frederick drowned after leaping off the ketch Miena which he was a member of the crew of. The vessel had loaded cement at the Portland wharf in the Whangārei Harbour and was returning to Auckland. Frederick was seen to "jump overboard and to attempt to swim to the shore, but he sank after swimming a short distance". The Miena reversed its engines and a launch and dinghy were sent from the wharf but they failed to locate him. His body was recovered by the police near Portland wharf on 25 December. The inquest found that he had accidentally drowned with another seaman giving evidence "of an argument during loading". The "master of the vessel, Angus Matheson, said that he saw Smith deliberately dive into the sea when the ship was about 150 yds, from the Portland wharf, but with the strong tide against him he was unable to do so, and sank before help could reach him". He was living at 9 Holiday Road, Milford, Auckland at the time and left behind a wife (Claire/Clara Isabell) and three daughters (Beverley, Valerie, and Shirley). His funeral was held at Morris' Chapel, Anne Street, Devonport on 27 December and he was buried at O'Neill's Point Cemetery.

Walton Victor Roy (Dick) Smith died on 2 July 1964, aged 52. His address at the time of his death was 19 Great South Road, Remuera. He was cremated by Watney Sibun's Sons Ltd on 6 July at Purewa Cemetery in Meadowbank, Auckland with his ashes returned.
