= George William Smith (sportsman) =

NZ dual-code international rugby footballer, track athlete & jockey

George Smith
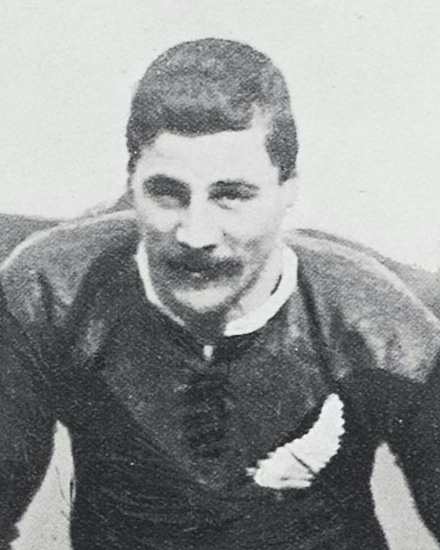
- Smith in 1905

Personal information
- Full name: George William Smith
- Born: 20 September 1874 Auckland, New Zealand
- Died: 7 December 1954 (aged 80) Oldham, Lancashire, England

Playing information
- Height: 170 cm (5 ft 7 in)
- Weight: 76 kg (12 st 0 lb)

Rugby union
- Position: Wing, Centre
Club
Years	Team	Pld	T	G	FG	P
1896–06	Auckland	12	8	0	0	24
Representative
Years	Team	Pld	T	G	FG	P
1897–05	New Zealand	2	2	0	0	6

Rugby league
- Position: Wing, Centre, Second-row
Club
Years	Team	Pld	T	G	FG	P
1908–16	Oldham	173	100	5	0	310
Representative
Years	Team	Pld	T	G	FG	P
1907–08	New Zealand	25	7	0	0	21
- Relatives: Dick Smith (nephew); Jack Smith (nephew)

George William Smith (20 September 1874 – 7 December 1954) was a New Zealand sportsman who excelled at track and field as well as both codes of rugby football.

== Early years ==
Smith was born in Auckland and educated at Wellesley Street School.

== Horse racing ==
He became a successful jockey and it was later reported he won the 1894 New Zealand Cup, riding Impulse. However this has been queried or disputed, for example:

- On the All Blacks website – "And if some historians can be believed, he was also the winning jockey when a horse called Impulse won the 1894 New Zealand Cup. There has been some scepticism about this, however, particularly from horse racing authorities. Smith was 20 years old in 1894 and it hardly seems logical that as a mature adult he could have ridden a winning mount at a weight of 7st 9lbs, then just a few years later played top rugby weighing nearly four stones heavier. Had Smith wasted to reach his horse's handicap then surely it would have sapped the strength needed to control a massive animal. But if true, and there have been claims of corroborating documentation, it increases even further Smith's legendary status."
- On the New Zealand Sports Hall of Fame website – "Early in his career, he was also a competent horseman and rode several winners but he did not, as legend has it, win a New Zealand Cup."

== Athletics ==
As a track athlete, Smith was an outstanding sprinter and hurdler, winning 15 national championships between 1898 and 1904 (100 yards sprint and 440 yards hurdles five times each and the 120 yards hurdles four times plus the 250 yards once), as well as multiple Australasian championships. He won the British Amateur Athletic Association Championships title in the quarter-mile hurdles at the 1902 AAA Championships, in which event he had an unofficial world record of 58.5s. While in Britain in 1902 Manningham F.C. tried to sign Smith to play rugby league. Smith turned down the £100 contract.

== Rugby union ==
Smith began his rugby career in 1895 playing rugby union for the City Rugby Club in Auckland. He first represented his home province Auckland in 1896 and, in the following year made, his début for the New Zealand national team against New South Wales. However, in the following years, Smith played little rugby, instead preferring to concentrate on track. He made a comeback in 1901, gaining All Black selection, before disappearing again until he was enticed back to the game with the prospect of joining the 'Originals' tour to the British Isles and France in 1905.

During the Originals tour, Smith was one of the outstanding players, especially in the early part of the tour, playing in 19 games, including the internationals against Scotland and Ireland, and scoring 19 tries. It was during this time in Britain that he first saw Northern Union being played.

Altogether, Smith made 39 appearances for New Zealand in rugby union, 21 as a wing and 18 at centre, and scored 34 tries.

Smith played for the City club and represented Auckland in 1906. City conducted a four-game tour of Sydney after the season had ended.

== Rugby league ==
While in Sydney with the City club Smith met an Australian entrepreneur, James Giltinan, and discussed the potential of professional rugby in Australasia. Smith is reported to have told Giltinan "What about you gettings Rugby League going in Australia, and I'll do my best when I cross the Tasman home." He then met Albert Baskiville in Wellington and played a leading part in the formation of the professional 1907-1908 New Zealand rugby tour of Great Britain, helping to select the touring party. At the time Smith was probably the best known athlete in New Zealand and his involvement in the tour lent it credibility and increased its ability to attract players. Smith was elected vice-captain and the tour was a success, both financially and on the field, with the team winning its three match series against Great Britain. Smith later described the tour as the happiest one he had ever been associated with.

After touring with the professional All Blacks he stayed on in Britain to play professionally with the Oldham club, signing a £150 contract. This gave Smith the financial freedom he had been seeking and he bought his fiancée over from New Zealand to join him in Oldham. George William Smith played at centre in Oldham's 9–10 defeat by Wigan in the 1908 Lancashire Cup Final during the 1908–09 season at Wheater's Field, Broughton, Salford on Saturday 19 December 1908. Smith played on the wing in Oldham's 3–7 defeat by Wigan in the Championship Final during the 1908–09 season at The Willows, Salford on Saturday 1 May 1909. By 1912 Smith had moved into the forwards and played at second row. Smith played for the club until 1916 when a broken leg ended his career.

== After retirement ==
Smith then joined a textile firm but in 1932 returned to rugby league, being involved in the Oldham coaching staff for three years. He often met touring New Zealand League and All Blacks sides. He lived in Oldham until his death on 7 December 1954.

== Legacy ==
Smith was posthumously inducted into the New Zealand Sports Hall of Fame in 1995. For his role in the birth of international rugby league, the 'George Smith Medal' was minted in 2002 to be awarded to the player of Test series between Great Britain and New Zealand. That year Smith's 92-year-old daughter Edna Stansfield, who was living in Oldham, viewed the medal inspired by her father when she was visited by a director of the New Zealand Rugby League. His son, George Smith, played both rugby codes and died in a Japanese prisoner camp in 1943. Two of Smith's nephews (Dick and Jack), born to his brother Walton, played rugby league for New Zealand in the 1930s.
