= Jack Smith (rugby league, New Zealand) =

NZ international rugby league & union player (1918-1970)

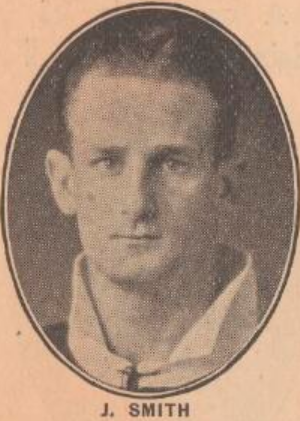

Personal information
- Full name: Charles Ernest Smith
- Born: 1 February 1918 Devonport, Auckland, New Zealand
- Died: 10 September 1970 (aged 52) Auckland, New Zealand

Playing information
- Height: 5 ft 9 in (1.75 m)
- Weight: 10 st 9 lb (68 kg)

Rugby league
- Position: Fullback, Wing, Centre, Stand-off
Club
Years	Team	Pld	T	G	FG	P
1937–46	North Shore Albions	90	20	226	2	516
Representative
Years	Team	Pld	T	G	FG	P
1937–41	Auckland	3	0	13	0	26
1938–45	North Island	2	0	14	0	28
1938–39	New Zealand	11	6	5	0	28
1940	Auckland Pākehā	1	2	3	0	12

Rugby union
Club
Years	Team	Pld	T	G	FG	P
1941	Papakura Army	2	0	5	0	12
Representative
Years	Team	Pld	T	G	FG	P
1942–45	Military Teams (Middle East)	6	0	10	0	27
- As of 1 December 2024
- Education: Devonport Primary School, Takapuna Grammar School
- Relatives: George W Smith (uncle); Dick Smith (brother)

Jack Smith was a rugby league player who represented New Zealand in eleven matches in the 1938 tour of Australia and 1939 aborted tour of England. He predominantly played at fullback but also on the wing and occasionally at centre and standoff. In the process he became the 265th player to represent New Zealand.

He also represented Auckland, the North Island, Auckland Pākehā, and played for several rugby teams in the Middle East while serving in World War 2. He was a member of the North Shore Albions club (also named Devonport United). His brother was Dick Smith, the New Zealand rugby league representative in 1932, they were both the nephews of the well known sportsman of the 1890s–1910s George Smith.

== Early life ==
Jack Smith was born Charles Ernest Smith but became known as Jack. He was born on 1 February 1918, to Walton Smith (1883-1938) and Clara Evelyn Smith (née Green) (1890-). He had two older brothers named Richard Frederick Smith (1909-1931), and Walton Victor Roy Smith (1911-1964), though Walton was better known as Dick Smith. Dick had also played for New Zealand in 1932 in three tests against England. Their uncle (Walton's brother) was George Smith, the famous sportsman who represented New Zealand in rugby union, rugby league, as well as being a champion runner.

== Playing career ==
=== North Shore Albions (Devonport United) rugby league ===
==== Juniors (1935–36) ====
Jack Smith began playing for North Shore Albions, known as Devonport United at the time, in the mid 1930s. At the start of the 1936 season at their annual meeting he was presented with a medal for being the best player in their seventh grade team for 1935. He was still attending Takapuna Grammar School at the time and playing for their first fifteen rugby side. On July 24 they traveled to Whangārei to play Whangarei High School at Kensington Oval with Smith playing at fullback. Whangarei won easily 20-9. While for his North Shore rugby league side he played in their third grade team in 1936 and won a trophy for his play for them which was presented at the 1937 annual meeting.

=== 1937 season ===
Jack Smith made his senior debut at the start of the 1937 season in the Auckland Rugby League competition. He went on to play 19 matches, scoring 7 tries and kicking 39 goals. Smith was named at centre, with Len Scott outside him on the wing and Verdun Scott on the other wing for their preliminary round match against Newton Rangers on April 17. In a 34-8 win Smith was “outstanding” and an “enterprising centre”. The New Zealand Herald wrote that “J. Smith is a promoted player, likely to be given a chance. He has speed and is clever on attack”. On April 24 they beat Marist Old Boys 24-15 with Smith kicking a conversion and three penalties. Len Scott scored a try after “a great piece of work by Smith” who gave Scott good support throughout the match, playing “a good game at centre”. The Herald wrote a short piece about him during the week headed “Out Standing Player” which said “a player who caught the eye for North Shore against Marist in the principal attraction last Saturday was J. Smith, the centre three-quarter. He showed ability above the average, making clever openings and running his supports into good positions. Smith is also a fine place-kick”.

In North Shore’s first Fox Memorial Shield game of the season Smith kicked 2 conversions and a penalty in a 19-12 loss to Manukau. He repeated the feat a week later on May 8 when North Shore beat Richmond Rovers 15-13 in the feature match at Carlaw Park. In a round 3 win over Marist Old Boys by 6 points to 5, Smith scored one of their tries. The Auckland Star said that Smith along with the other inside backs showed “dash and daring”. Then against Ponsonby he kicked three penalties in an 8-8 draw with the newspaper saying that he “had his kicking boots on with a vengeance”.

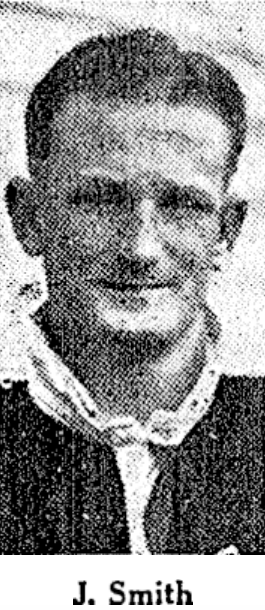
Jack Smith aged 19 in his debut season.

The Herald wrote that “the value of a good place-kick to a team was well exemplified in the North Shore-Ponsonby match when J. Smith, the North Shore centre, kicked three excellent penalty goals”. Then two weeks later in Round 6 Smith scored all nine of North Shore’s points in a 10-9 loss to City Rovers. His points came through a try, a conversion, and two penalties. He played at five eighths and “was the best of the backs” for North Shore. The Auckland Star said “Smith was the outstanding back”. As well as kicking a “fine goal” he “narrowly missed another, which would have given North Shore the game”. He then moved back to the centre position for North Shore’s 13-0 win over Newton Rangers on June 12. He kicked a conversion and a penalty with it written that “in Smith, the Shore team have a very promising centre and a goal kicker”. He was “the best of the North Shore backs, being prominent on attack”. North Shore had a break with representative matches on and travelled to Huntly to play the local side on June 19 with North Shore winning 23-5.

After senior games resumed in Auckland on July 3 Smith kicked a lone conversion in a heavy 31-11 loss to Manukau at Carlaw Park. North Shore then lost again, to Richmond 13-11 though Smith “at five eighths got the try of the match with a great run from halfway, and in addition landed two penalty goals”. Smith and Zane were singled out for their outstanding defence which kept Noel Bickerton and Ted Mincham in check. Smith “caught Mincham, centre, in possession” on many occasions. During the game he “gathered in the loose and cleverly beat MIncham and Bickerton and after a fast run for 40 yards gave Furnell a perfect “dummy” to score near the posts”. In a 9-7 win over City on July 17 “Smith and V. Scott appeared to be the best”. He missed a try when he “made a nice dash and had [Cyril] Wiberg beaten for pace but V. Scott collided with Smith in attempting a scissors pass”. The Herald said that Smith and Zane were the best of their backs. Smith missed their next match with Marist after suffering from a “poisoned hand” and was still not listed in their side for their July 31 match against Newton with North Shore losing both games.

He returned to play on August 21 against Ponsonby in a 23-9 loss. He kicked a conversion and two penalties and was said to be “the best of the backs, with fine all round play, and as a place kick he is about the most reliable club man in Auckland”. Then playing at centre in a high scoring loss to Mount Albert United by 38 to 22 Smith scored a try and kicked 7 goals. He “gave a fine all-round display”. The Herald wrote that “Smith had a successful day, securing many points for North Shore from place kicks and also scoring a good try”.

With the championship now finished North Shore played Ponsonby in round 1 of the Roope Rooster and were eliminated following a 23-21 loss. Smith kicked 5 goals and the Star wrote “the fine all-round play of Smith in the centre was of great value to his side…”. North Shore now moved into the Phelan Shield competition and Smith scored 2 tries and kicked 3 more goals in a 15-14 win against Richmond. He reportedly “topped his 100 points for the season” in the match. His “good goal kicking… gave North Shore the advantage”. Then in the semi final “a feature of the game was the splendid play of J. Smith, the North Shore centre. Late in the second half Manukau played with renewed vigour and looked likely to turn the tables. Smith however, scored a fine try and placed the result beyond doubt”. North Shore went on to win the Phelan Shield final 22-18 against Mount Albert on October 2. Smith kicked two goals including a go ahead penalty towards the end of the game. He played centre and “was seen at his best”. The Herald said that Smith at centre was “outstanding” and he “figured in most of the back movements and gave his best display to date” though he “had a day off at goal kicking”. In a summary of the year the Herald wrote that Smith had shown “good form” at centre three-quarter during the year. It was also announced that E Bennett of Takapuna was donating a trophy to present to Jack Smith for his point scoring feats for the season where he was said to have scored 132 points in all games. He was only beaten by John Anderson of Marist who had scored 148. It had been very rare for players to score more than 100 points in club matches in Auckland to this point and rarer still for two players to achieve the feat.

==== Auckland Selection ====
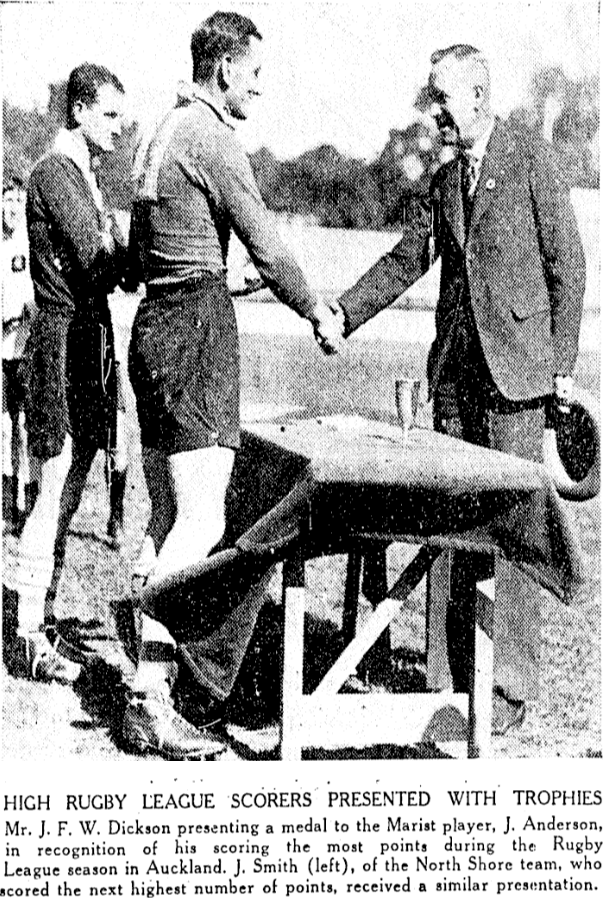

Smith’s achievements for the season saw him chosen in the 17 player Auckland squad to train to play against New Zealand Māori on October 9. When the squad was reduced to 15 he was named as one of the backs. The Auckland (Pākehā) team was beaten 43-21 by the Māori side. During the afternoon Smith was presented with his trophy along with Anderson with a photograph recording the moment published in the New Zealand Herald.

=== 1938 season ===
The 1938 season saw Jack Smith make his test debut for New Zealand. He only played ten matches for North Shore as he spent two months touring Australia with the New Zealand side in the middle part of the season. In those ten matches he did not score a try but did kick 39 goals. He was selected to play for Auckland in one match, and also made the North Island side for their inter-island match.

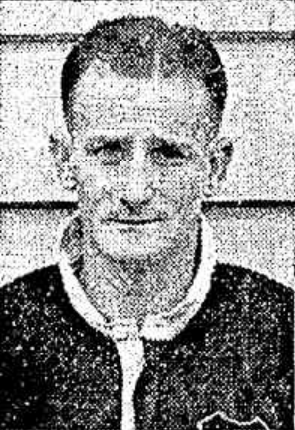

Joining him in the North Shore side for the season was his brother Dick Smith who had come out of retirement after a season with Newton in 1936, having played for the North Shore seniors prior to that from 1931 to 1935. They lost their first round Fox Memorial match with Marist 23 to 7 at Carlaw Park. Jack kicked “two splendid goals” in the first half to make the score close and was said to have “played a good game at centre three-quarter, while R [Dick] Smith showed patches of his old form”. The Auckland Star said that in [Jack] Smith “they have a good centre, who, in addition, is a remarkably fine place-kick”. The side was being coached by Australian Bob Banham who had been brought across the Tasman to develop senior players in the Auckland area. He initially was appointed to the North Shore club which had several young backs. It was reported that “both Smith brothers were associated in some nice play with the coach, and their play will be more effective once movements have been discussed with Banham”. North Shore lost their next match against Manukau 26 to 21 with Smith kicking five goals with the newspapers describing him as “a big asset”, and his brother Dick kicked one. He was also said to have “played a good game at fullback and often raced his backs into scoring positions”. Their first win followed with a 15-11 defeat of Mount Albert on April 23 with Smith kicking three goals and “played a good game”. It was said that “J. Smith, usually a five eighths, was a success at fullback. Not only did Smith open up the play for the three quarters, but his tackling also compared with anything seen on the ground”. North Shore then lost a controversial match 20-19 to Richmond with the game ordered to be replayed at a later date if required. An obstruction try was ruled but the referee allowed the conversion from where the ball was placed afterwards rather than in line with where the play was when he blew his whistle. Smith kicked five goals for North Shore though it was reported that “North Shore started with great dash and had J. Smith been in his best kicking form the result would have been placed beyond doubt in the first spell”. He had an “occasional kicking duel” with Frank Furnell on the Richmond side. Smith also “played a cool game at fullback for North Shore. His handling and kicking were rarely at fault, while he tackled soundly” and “continued to show good form”. Another 3 goals followed in their 24-16 win over City in round 5. He “raced his backs into position”, and “played a splendid game at fullback and made several nice openings. His goal kicking was a feature of the game”. Once again Smith showed his kicking prowess in a 20-15 win against Papakura in round 6 when he converted both of their tries and kicked five penalties. He was said to have had “a goal kicking duel” with J. McInnes of Papakura who kicked six goal himself. Smith, at full back was said to have “played a splendid game on attack, and rarely failed to start a passing bout…”.

==== Auckland selection ====
On May 12 Smith was named at fullback in the Auckland team to play against a Rest of the North Island side on May 18 at Carlaw Park. The Auckland Star said that “consistently good play and marked goal kicking ability has resulted in J. Smith, the North Shore player, getting the place of full-back in the Auckland team”. Auckland thrashed their opponent 67-14 with Smith converting seven tries and John Anderson four of their 14 tries. It was said that “little fault could be found with Smith at fullback, who fielded well and kicked with good judgement”.

==== North Island selection ====
After Auckland’s easy win Smith was named by selectors Thomas McClymont, Hec Brisbane, and Gordon Hooker in the North Island to play the South Island. The North Island trounced the South Island 55-2 with Smith converting 10 of their 12 tries and also adding a penalty. Unsurprisingly most of his conversions were “from in front”. He was said to have “played an outstanding game” at fullback where “he handled and kicked well, and was very sound on defence, while he showed much cleverness in running his backs into attacking positions”.

==== New Zealand selection for Australian Tour (1938) ====
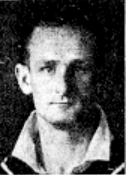

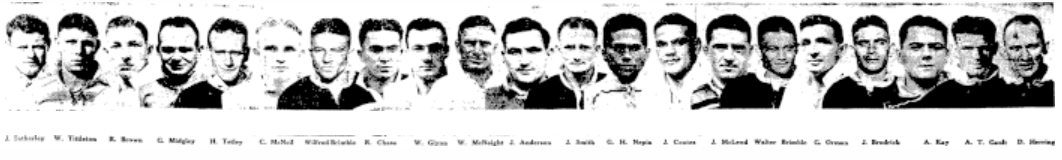
New Zealand rugby league team profile pictures of the touring team to Australia in 1938.

After the inter-island match Jack Smith was chosen for the New Zealand team on their nine match tour of Australia. The selectors were Hec Brisbane, Scotty McClymont, and Jim Amos. Smith was named as one of the two touring full backs with the other being the famous George Nēpia, though he was later unable to tour and was replaced by Jack Hemi. The Star newspaper said “the inclusion of J. Smith… is fully justified. The young North Shore player has steadily made his way to the top this season and his remarkable goal kicking ability has given him an added claim for recognition”. Smith was aged just 20 at the time.

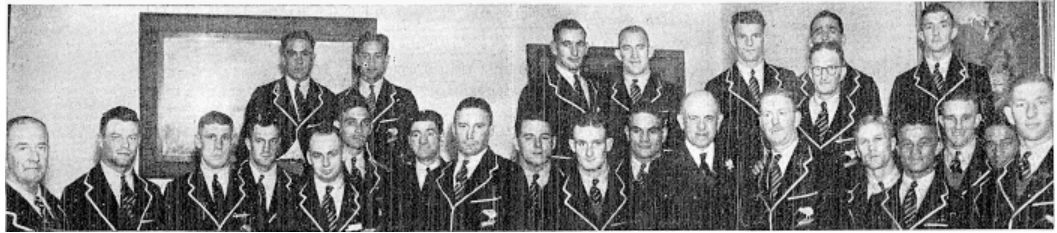
NZ team at a civic reception. Smith is in the front row, slightly to the right of centre

Tragedy struck Smith’s family when his father died just five days after his naming in the touring side. Walton was aged 55 years old. The notice in the newspaper said “The death occurred at Devonport this morning of Mr. Walter [sic] Smith, a well-known resident, and father of R. Smith and J. Smith, two well-known North Shore rugby league players, the latter being the full back chosen for the New Zealand league team to tour Australia. Mr. Smith was a brother of George Smith, the former well-known Auckland footballer, who was a member of the original All Black team which toured Britain and Canada. Members of the North Shore team, in their match with Ponsonby this afternoon, at Devonport, wore white armlets”. Smith did not play in the match. Dick sent the Auckland Rugby League a thank you letter for their sympathy shown towards the family. His funeral was held on May 30 and saw the New Zealand team in attendance.

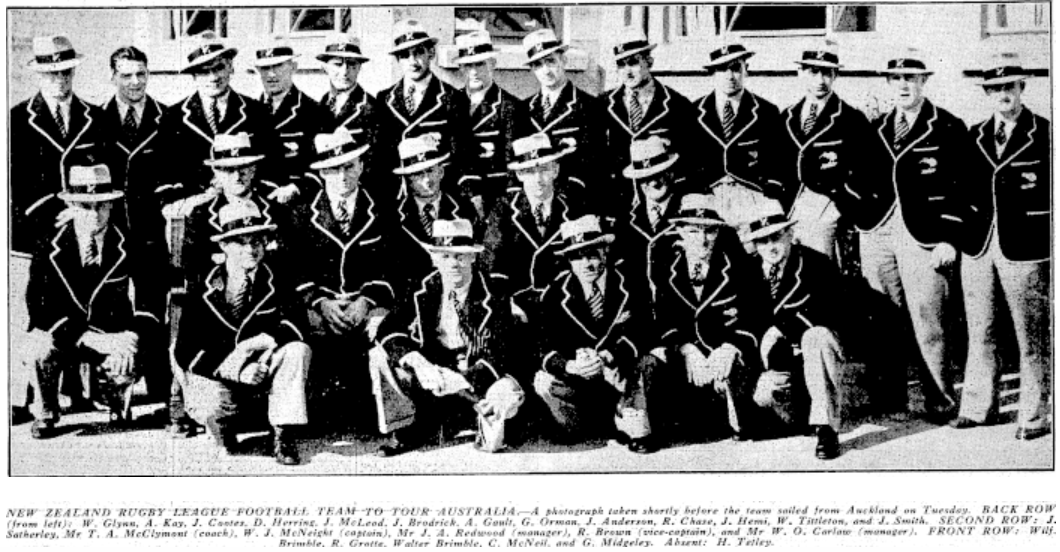
NZ Team 1938

The New Zealand team departed Auckland on board the Canadian – Australasian liner, RMS Niagara on the evening of 31 May. The same day they had also been given a civic farewell by the mayor, Sir Ernest Davis at the Auckland Town Hall at noon following a morning tea at George Court, Limited. While the night before they had a farewell ball at the Peter Pan cabaret.

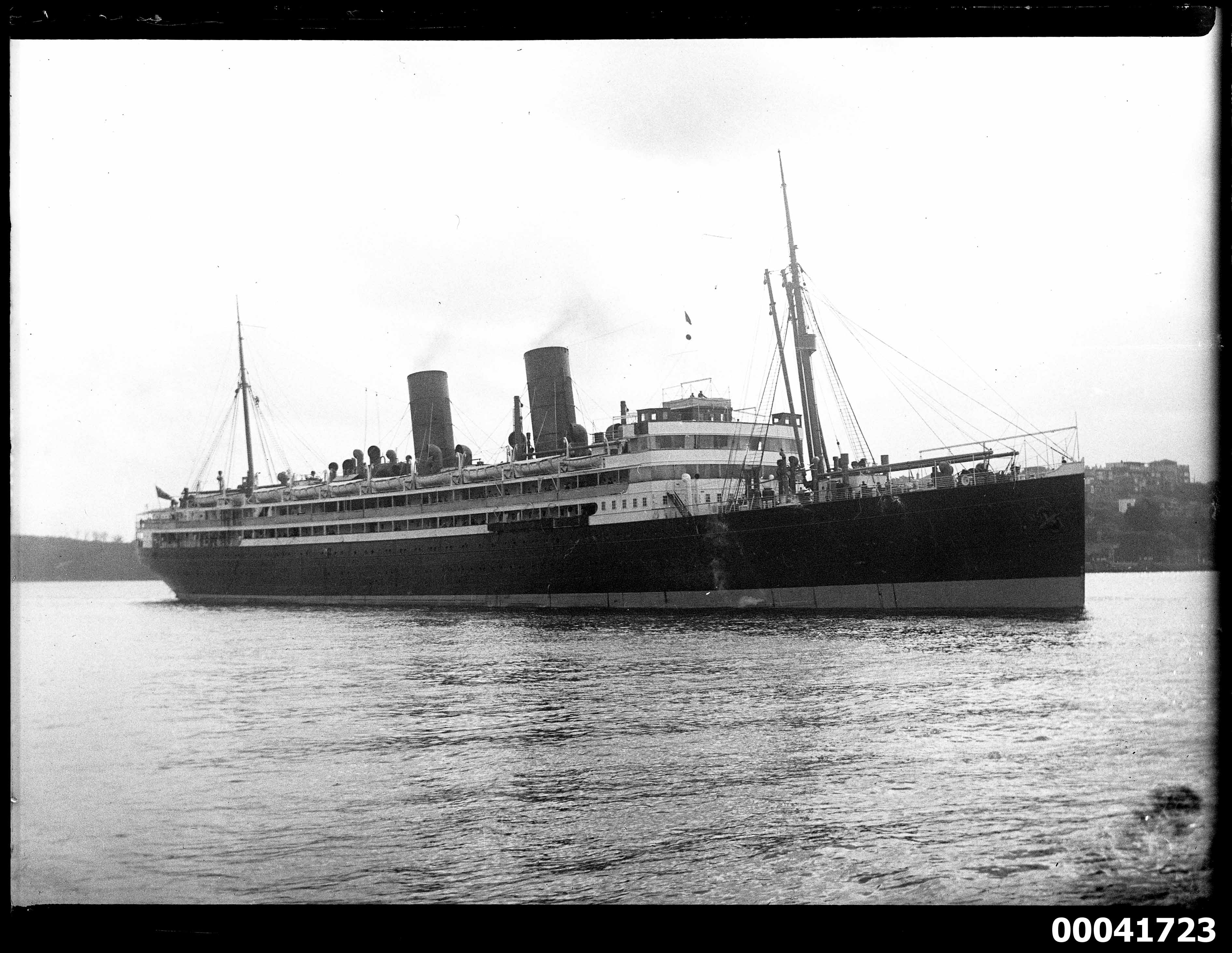
The Niagara Ship

In comments on the New Zealand players the Sydney Morning Herald noted that Smith “is a very fine place kick” and mentioned his relationship with George Smith. The Sun (Sydney) newspaper stated that Smith “will most likely play in the big games [and] should show Australians some brilliant goal kicking”. He was also “fully expected to make good” on the tour in a piece by an Auckland correspondent that appeared in The Telegraph (Brisbane). The Courier-Mail in an article by Pat Frawley noted that Smith was “the lightest man” in the New Zealand squad weighing 10 stone. Though he in fact weighed 10 stone 9 pounds and halfback Wilfred Brimble weighed just 10 stone 3 pounds. While The Labor Daily (Sydney) said that Smith had “advanced steadily this season, as the result of tuition from ex-South Sydney back, Bobby Banham”. An Auckland correspondent in a Sydney Morning Herald article said that Smith “was originally a centre-threequarter, but is ideally suited to the position of custodian”. The Sun said “the find of the season is Jack Smith, who is playing only his second year [of seniors] in the game. He started last year as a five eighth, and is now a full-back. In three matches he kicked 25 goals”.

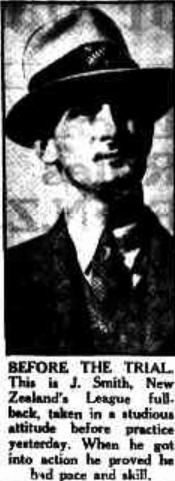

He was further talked up in The Labor Daily on June 6 as being “expected to develop into one of the starts of the side” and that he “kicks goals from anywhere”.

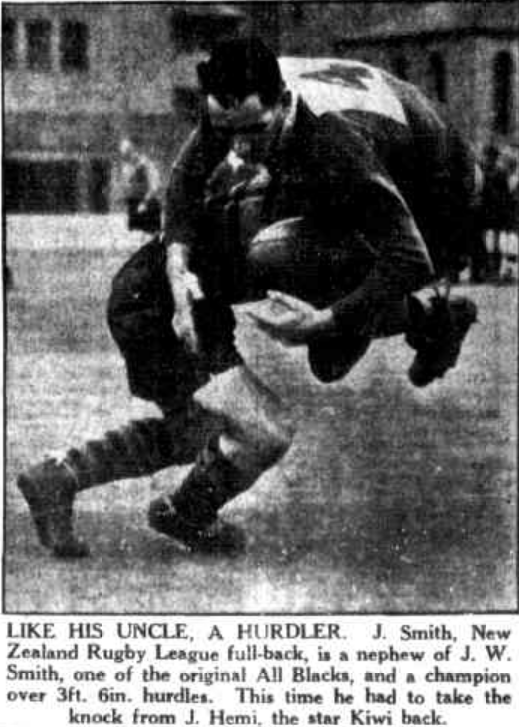

In the same newspaper there was also a photograph of Smith being tackled at training by Jack Hemi.

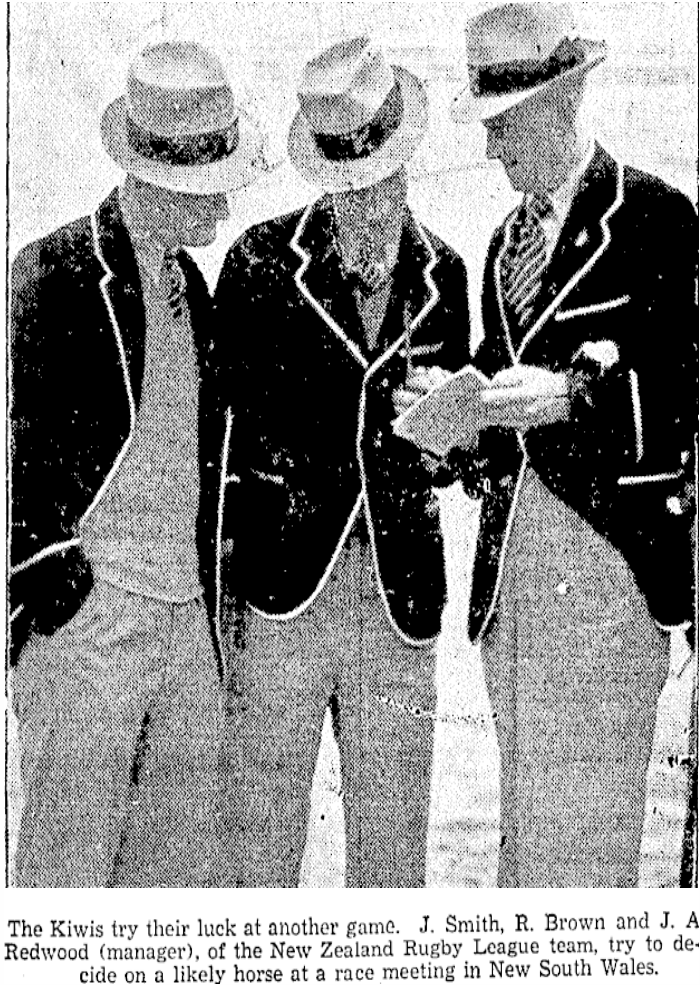

He was also photographed at the Rosebury horse races.

Smith was named at full back in New Zealand’s first team to play against New South Wales on June 11 at the Sydney Cricket Ground. The first tour match saw New Zealand lose 25-12 with 28,303 in attendance, though they were unlucky after losing Arthur Kay to injury when they were dominating the game. Smith “played well, but did not live up to his reputation as a goal kicker”. This was due to Jack Hemi being preferred as kicker, and he would go on to kick 32 goals compared to Smith’s five and John Anderson’s three on the tour. Smith did get some attempts at goal in the first half but missed them. During the first half Smith kicked to Frank Johnston, and two passes later the NSW clearing kick was charged down by Harold Tetley with Arthur Kay gathering and scoring. He also drove NSW back with his punting on other occasions. A few minutes into the second half Smith “limped out” with an injury, though he soon came back on. The Truth (Sydney) newspaper wrote that “Smith had a lot to do for a full-back and looked all in at the finish. He has a most pleasing style”. The Courier-Mail noted that “one of the great surprises was the poor kicking of J. Smith, full-back, and J. Hemi, the winger. Both had gained reputations in New Zealand as first rate goal kickers. On Saturday Hemi had several kicks, and Smith had a couple, but they showed poor form”. With Smith’s first attempt he “kicked the ground and only dribbled the ball along. His second attempt was little better. Apparently Smith, only a youth, was nervous, as he was playing in his first big match”. The Labor Daily said that “fullback Smith had a lot to do and was a very tired youth at the finish”. While The Daily Telegraph (Sydney) wrote that he “catches the ball nicely, has a long-range punt, and is a fine tackler”.

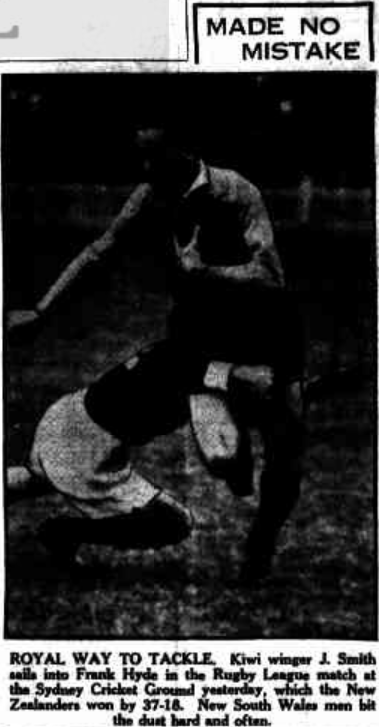

For their second match against the same New South Wales opponent two days later in June 13, Smith was bracketed at fullback with Hemi in the initial squad list. When the final team was named Hemi played fullback with Smith on the right wing. He had replaced Ray Brown in that position. New Zealand won 37-18 before 18,426 spectators with Smith scoring two of New Zealand’s seven tries. Early in the match Smith was involved in “a nice New Zealand movement” with brothers Walter Brimble and Wilfred Brimble, and Wally Tittleton which took play into the New South Wales 25. With New Zealand trailing 8-3 “New Zealand attacked, and in a loose movement Bill McNeight got the ball to Rangi Chase, who threw it to Smith, who scored in the corner”. His other try was “the best try of the day” when “[Jack] McLeod, Tittleton, Wilfred Brimble, and McLeod again and Smith handled for the last named to cross in the corner” after having to reach out. In the second half William Conlon for NSW “ran hard, but lost the ball and Smith sped downfield and kicked”, then later Smith was involved with Hemi and McLeod “in a fine passing burst” with McLeod being tackled on the line. The Sydney Morning Herald said the following day that Clarry McNeil and Smith “on the wings, showed dash”. While The Referee newspaper said “Smith and Tittleton quick as cats, turned errors by home backs into tries by very clever football, the second try after perfect running and passing, with the supports most timely”. And went on to add “Smith, Chase, McNeil, and Tittleton. These glittered individually and in unison. Beautiful to watch, they took advantage of many errors by home backs in ground fielding and in passing. Smith and Chase were particular stars on this occasion”. And that he “shaped nicely, kicking strongly” during the match.

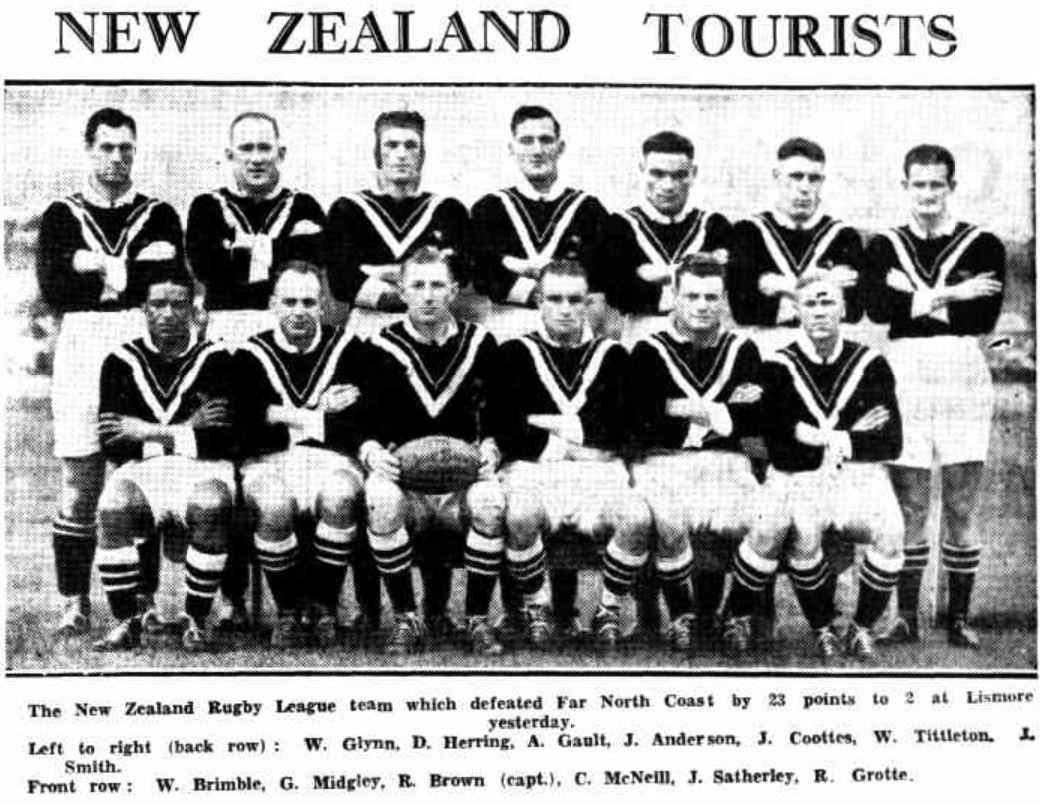
New Zealand RL team to play Far North Coast in 1938

Following the game the team left for Lismore on June 14 on a special division of the North Coast Mail. Smith was named at fullback for the June 15 game against North Coast. New Zealand won 23-2 on a “rain-soaked field” with heavy showers falling during the match with 2,200 spectators present. During the first half with the North Coast attacking in New Zealand territory “Smith cleared with a long penalty”. A while later J. Kilroy broke through but “was brought down by Smith, who snapped up the ball and New Zealand crashed through the defence; but with the whole field to themselves [Walter] Brimble passed forward to Anderson and a splendid chance was lost”. The tackle was described in more detail with Kilroy running “from the 25 to the centre field flag and was drawing away from the full back Smith. The last named, however hurled himself at the winger and brought him down. It was a grand tackle, but was only one of the many made by both full backs during the day”. Smith was said to have outplayed his opposite (O’Connor) but “principally because he had more opportunities”. With Jack Hemi not in the side Smith had goal kicking duties and he “was an accurate goal kicker and converted four of the five New Zealand tries”. Smith’s defence was good with it reported that “only sound tackling by him prevented the home side from scoring several tries”.

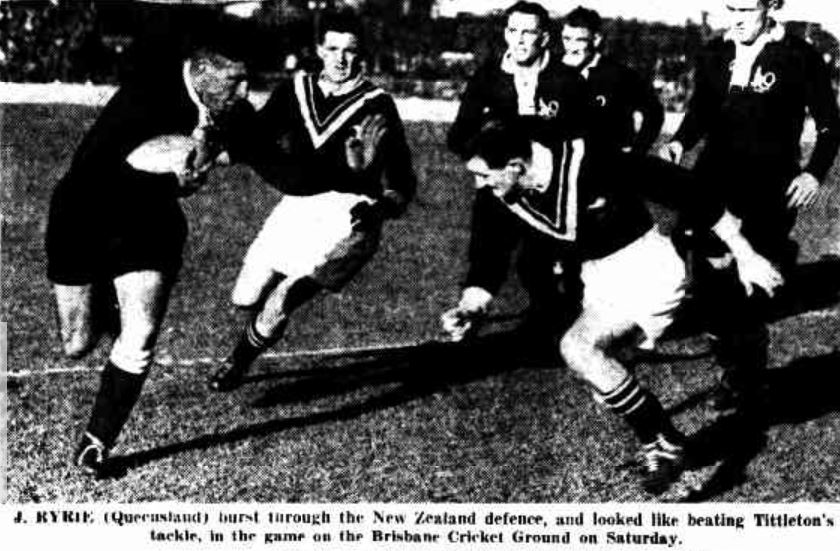
Smith attempting a tackle on Jack Ryrie with the caption incorrectly claiming it was Wally Tittleton.

Smith found himself back on the wing for the fourth tour match against Queensland on June 18.

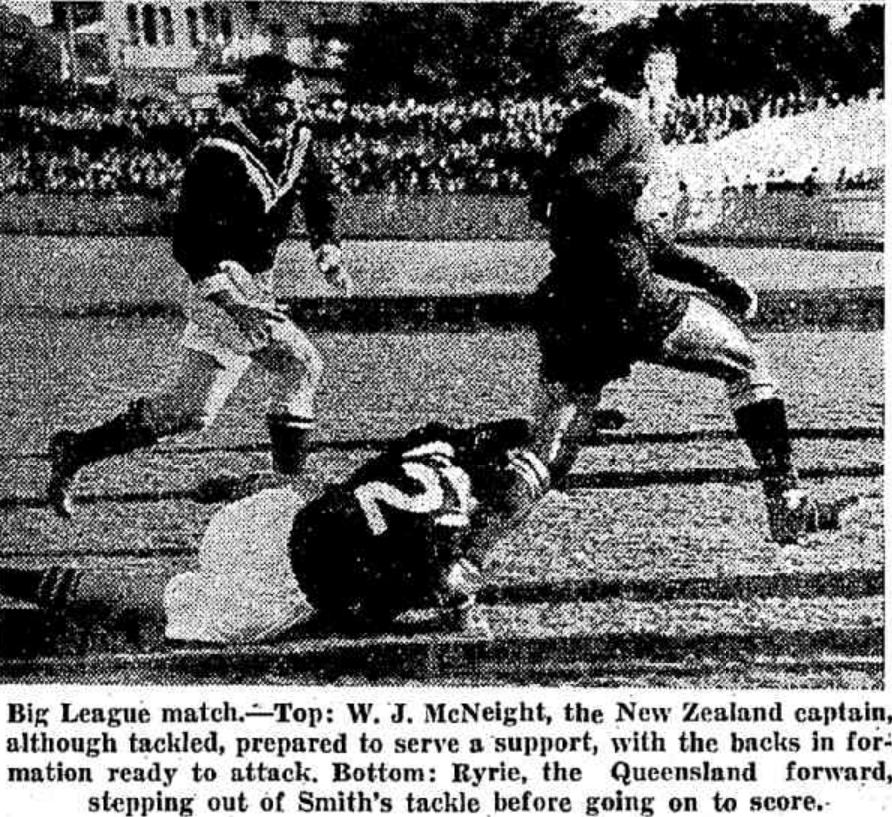

Jack Hemi coming back into the side at fullback. New Zealand was well beaten 31-11 at the Woolloongabba (Brisbane Cricket Ground) before 12,000 spectators. Smith scored New Zealand’s only try. New Zealand was badly beaten for possession in the scrums and the backs were starved of the ball. The Truth newspaper reported that “not enough was seen of the threes to rate 'em or slate 'em, but we liked Rangi Chase at centre and Jack Smith winger best. Given more ball and opportunity – wacko!”.

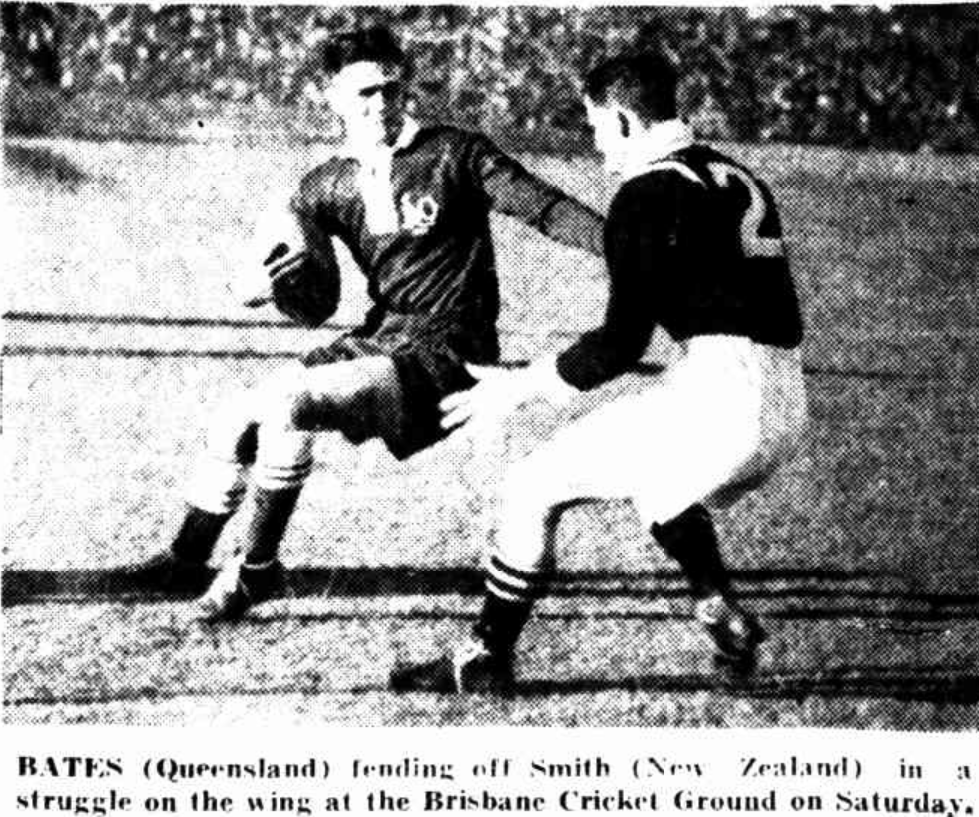

Smith’s try came early in the second half with New Zealand trailing 18-6. Queensland fullback “whittle took the ball from Tetley’s toe, but Smith saw an open field ahead when he gathered the ball as it rebounded from a colleague”.

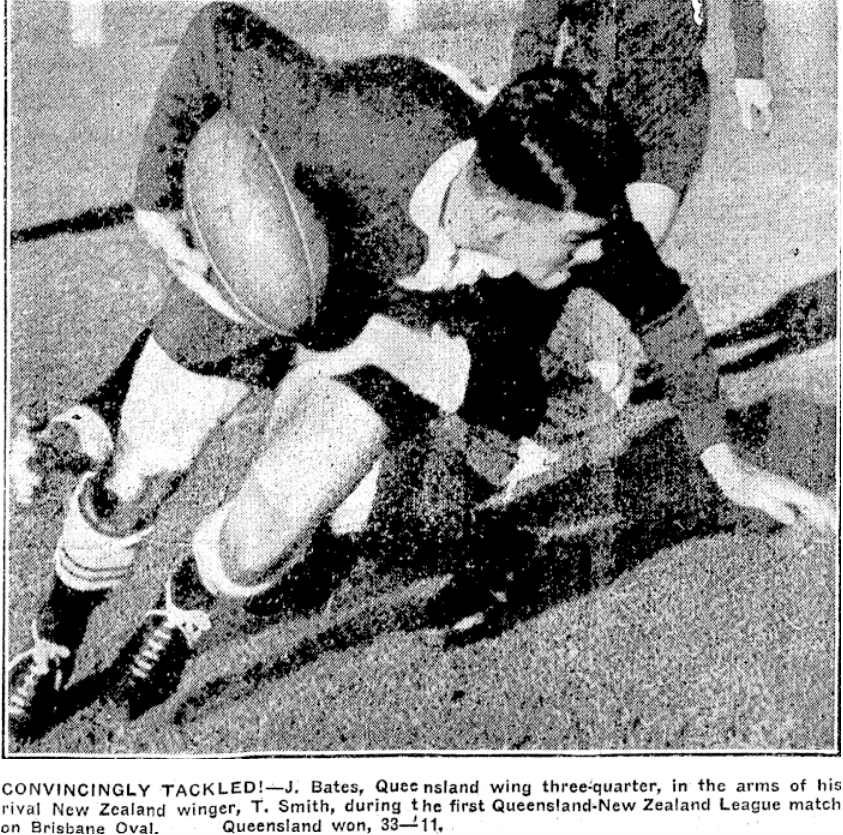

The Queensland wingers Ronald Cooper, and Jack Bates were said to have “more than held their own with Smith and [Ray] Brown”. The Telegraph (Brisbane) said that all the wingers were starved of the ball though “occasionally we saw flashes of brilliance from Kiwi winger Smith, and [Tommy] Chase in the centre. But their opportunities were so rare that it would be difficult to judge their real ability. Smith has plenty of pace, and a good swerve, and had he been given room in which to move he would have made his own openings. But for the most part when he did get the ball he found himself up against a solid defence – solid in both numbers and virility – and he suffered severe punishment”. It was also said that “Smith on the left flank showed pace and nippiness in a couple of scuttling bursts along touch, but was not supported, and the pass inside (generally a perhapser) was not taken”. It was reported by manager Jack Redwood in the New Zealand newspapers that Smith “was troubled with a sore leg” though it was not mentioned when he had picked up this injury with the implication being that it may have occurred in the first match of the tour.

Smith was named in a 15 man squad for the next match against Toowoomba on June 22. He was ultimately named to start, this time in the centre three-quarter position. New Zealand won 12-11 before a crowd of 2,500 at the Toowoomba Athletic Ground. Their sixth tour match was a second game against Queensland at the Woolloongabba once more on June 25. Smith was moved back to full back to enable Jack Hemi to come up into the centre three-quarter position. New Zealand lost again though by the narrower score of 21-12 before a crowd of 7,000. Smith scored one of New Zealand’s two tries and they led 12-5 at halftime before tiring in the second half. Smith “eclipsed all other scoring efforts with a tricky run through the defence after fielding a punt at midfield. He received a great ovation as not a defender laid a hand on him. He tackled splendidly all day and held his own with [Gordon] Whittle, the Kangaroo fullback”. At one stage Ronald Cooper, the Queensland wing beat Rangi Chase and then beat Smith to score a try. Smith’s try was described in more detail saying it “was a centre movement, and was one of the cleverest efforts of the two Queensland matches. Smith slipped through the defence in amazing fashion, swirling away from tacklers with the grace of a stage dancer”. Smith had received the ball after a scrum close to the Queensland tryline saw Jack Reardon punt the ball downfield. After Smith gathered the ball ran to the Queensland three quarter line and turned “his back on them as though to pass back to his supporters, he pivoted and went through an open gate to touch down” after “leaving man after man standing as if he was glued to the sport” with Hemi converting to give New Zealand a 9-4 lead. In final comments on the game the Telegraph (Brisbane) said that Gordon “Whittle did not impress as much as his rival, Smith”.

New Zealand now traveled to Tamworth to play a NSW Group 4 side on June 29. Smith was retained at fullback and kicked a goal in New Zealand’s 26-15 win.

His successful kick was a conversion of their second try by Billy Glynn. Smith was said to have been “always sound” at fullback and his fitness was better than his opponent, G. Smith’s.

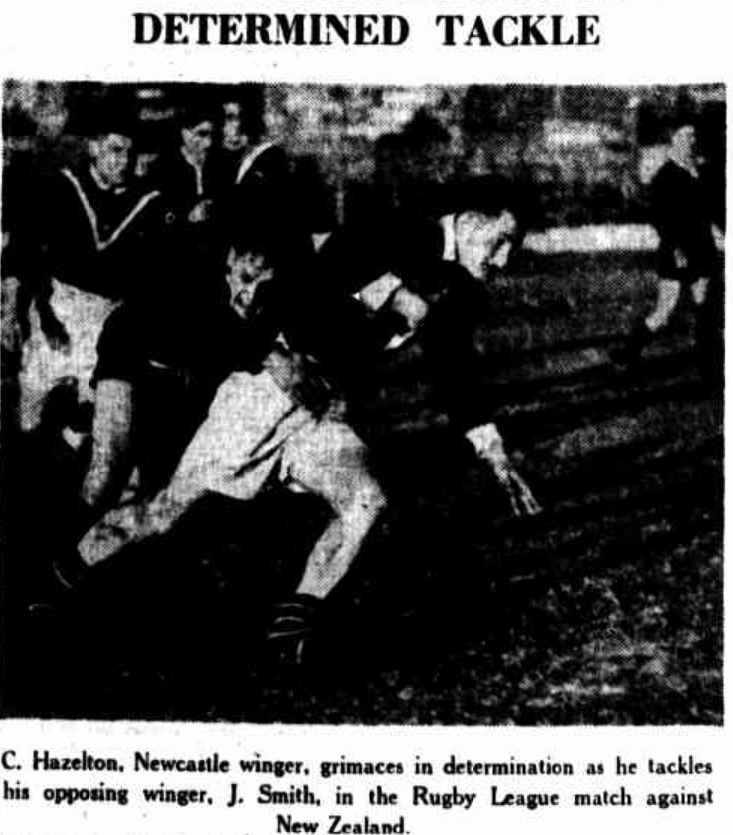

New Zealand’s penultimate tour match was against Newcastle at the Newcastle Sports Ground on July 2. Smith was named in the 16 man squad which featured 8 backs. He was ultimately named on the wing with Hemi at fullback and scored one of New Zealand’s six tries in a 30-19 victory before 5,000 spectators. Newcastle won the majority of the scrums and as a result the New Zealand halves Wilfred and Walter Brimble received very little ball and “wingers Jack Smith and Ray Brown” were starved of the ball. His try came “after weak efforts by the Newcastle backs” saw him cross near the corner. In the lead up Joe Cootes, Bill McNeight, and Rangi Chase combined with Smith before he crossed.

For the final game of the tour against Sydney at the Sydney Cricket Ground on July 6 Smith was chosen in the unaccustomed position of halfback. The match was drawn 19-19. He was initially named in an 8 man backline on the left wing. Smith was shown as playing at first five eighth in some team lineups with Wilfred Brimble at halfback. However in the most detailed match description of the game, in the Sydney Morning Herald, they stated that “in the first half New Zealand tried J. Smith – full-back and winger in earlier matches – as half-back, but after the interval W.P. Brimble was the half, with Tittleton as five eighth and Smith on the wing”.

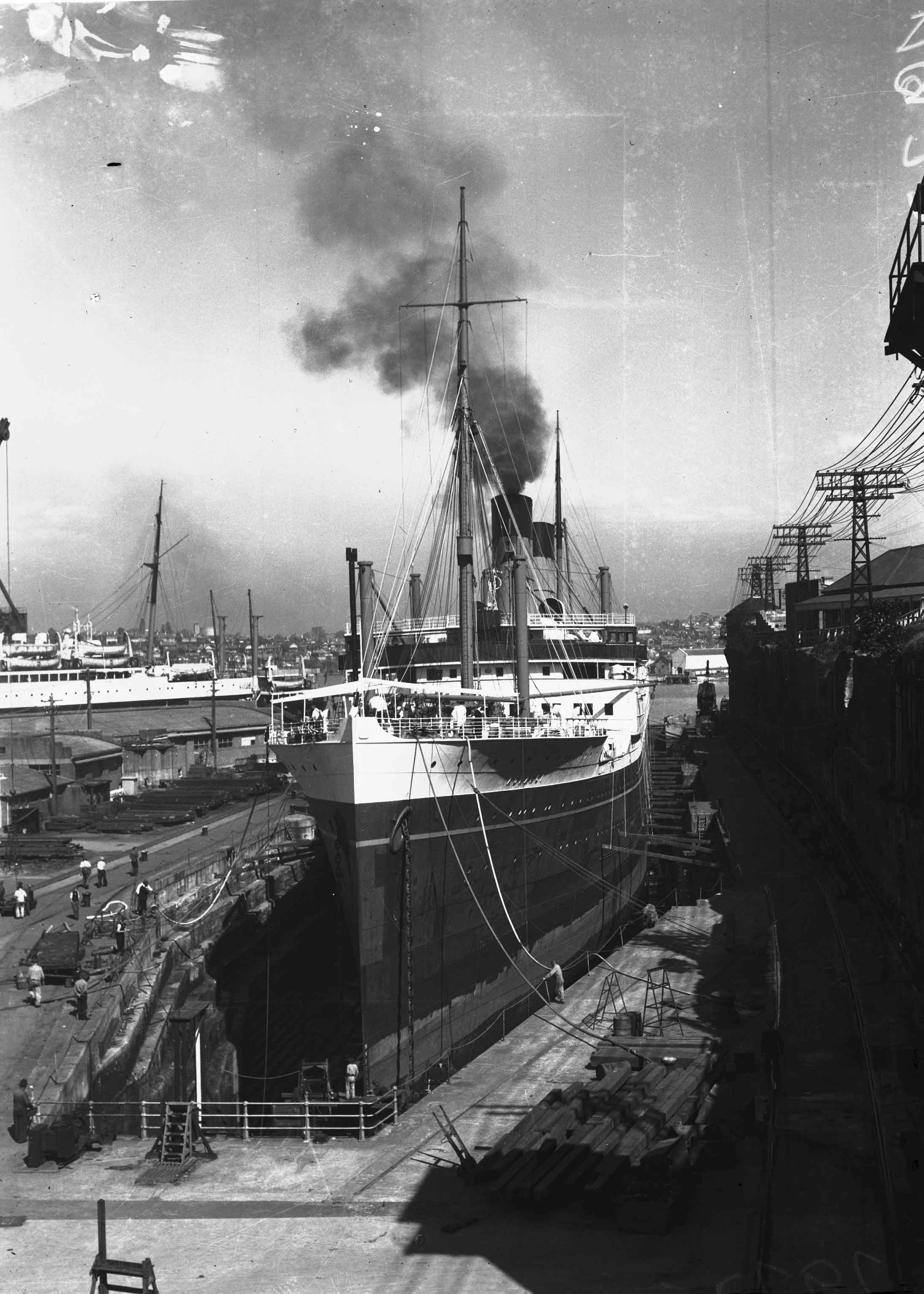
Aorangi in dry dock in Sydney in the 1940s

With the tour now complete the New Zealand side arrived back in Auckland on board the Aorangi on the morning of July 11. In comments about the tour from one of the managers, Jack Redwood, “spoke well of J. Smith, the young North Shore player, who was fielded in every match” and said his defense was impressive. While Scotty McClymont mentioned two highlights of the tour were Jack Hemi’s 65 yard penalty goal in Brisbane, “and a try by J. Smith in the second match against Queensland. Smith went clean through the Queensland backs with a waltzing run that had everyone baffled”.

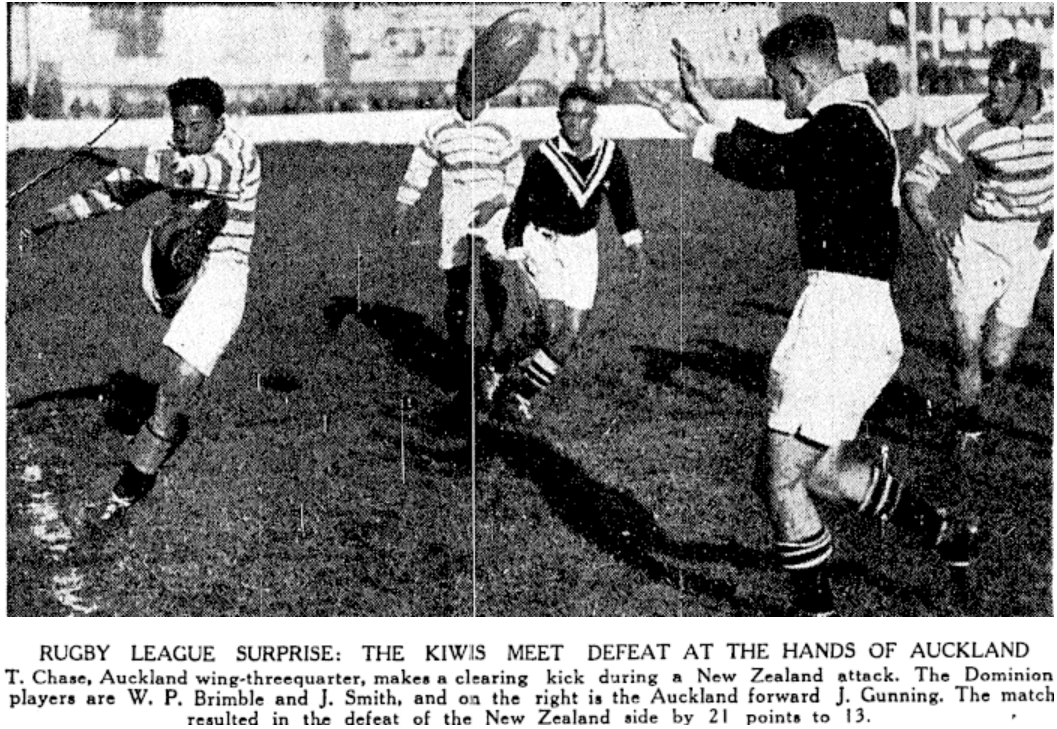
Tommy Chase kicking with Jack Smith attempting to charge it down.

New Zealand was to play a final match after their return against Auckland at Carlaw Park on July 16. Smith was named on the wing. Auckland won the game 21 to 13 with Smith scoring an intercept try for New Zealand. The Auckland Star wrote that Smith “who went on tour at full-back, has materialised into a dashing wing of the opportunist kind”. His try came after he intercepted a pass from Bill Glover and crossed for New Zealand’s first try after he out sprinted Verdun Scott in a race to the corner. Smith again intercepted a pass later on and showed “individual cleverness”. Also early in the match he raced 40 yards and passed to Wilfred Brimble who sent the ball to Wally Tittleton but he dropped in and lost the try.

==== Return to North Shore ====
With Smith’s New Zealand obligations now complete he returned to his North Shore club side. He played in their 7-5 loss to Ponsonby on July 23 in round 14 of the championship and converted Bennetts try. In the second half at fullback he “repeatedly saved his team from strong Ponsonby forward attacks” in a ground described as a “quagmire”. He gave “one of the best displays in the match”, and his “positional play had the hall-mark of real class. Clever kicking for the gap caused Ponsonby endless trouble, and it was one of the best phases of tactical play for the occasion”. In their round 17 loss to Newton 13-10, Smith kicked a conversion and a penalty. Early in the game “good play by J. Smith gave L. Scott a chance, but he was tackled a few feet from the Newton line”. Then a while later “Smith raced into Newton territory before passing to Zane, and Hammill scored a fine try”. The following week North Shore had a bye and traveled to Whangarei to play a combined Whangarei side at Jubilee Park. North Shore won 33-0 with Smith kicking five conversions and a penalty. He started at centre but switched with Verdun Scott at fullback near the end of the game. His “kicking was a feature of the game, the New Zealand representative piloting the ball between the uprights from alarming angles with uncanny accuracy. He missed only two kicks during the day”. The Northern Advocate wrote: “star of the team was Jack Smith, who was one of the Kiwis’ most useful members in the recent Australian tour. While on tour Smith was available for any position – half, five-eighth, centre, wing, or full-back – and local fans saw some of his versatility, as although he played the greater part at centre he was also seen at full-back. Smith’s accurate goal-kicking was an indication of how many points can be piled up from this source”.

In round 1 of the Roope Rooster North Shore travelled to Prince Edward Park in Papakura to play the Papakura side. North Shore won 5-3 with Smith kicking a crucial penalty goal in the first half. They beat Marist Old Boys 8-2 in round 2. He and G. Brown “did fine work in defence, especially Smith, whose covering was very thorough”. He converted a try to Souter with “a great kick” and at centre three-quarter, “was a thorn in the side of the opposition, and repeatedly saved his team with good positional play and excellent defence”. He then kicked two penalties in a 20-7 semi final loss to Richmond on September 10. Their try to Brown came after Smith had “raced well into Richmond territory”. Their final game of the season was a Phelan Shield defeat to Papakura on September 17 by 16 points to 12. Smith converted both of Brown’s tries and kicked a penalty while playing “a sound game at fullback”. Along with Brown, V. Scott, Smith was “the best of the backs”, with Smith “showing a lot of pace on occasions when running for position”.

=== 1939 season ===
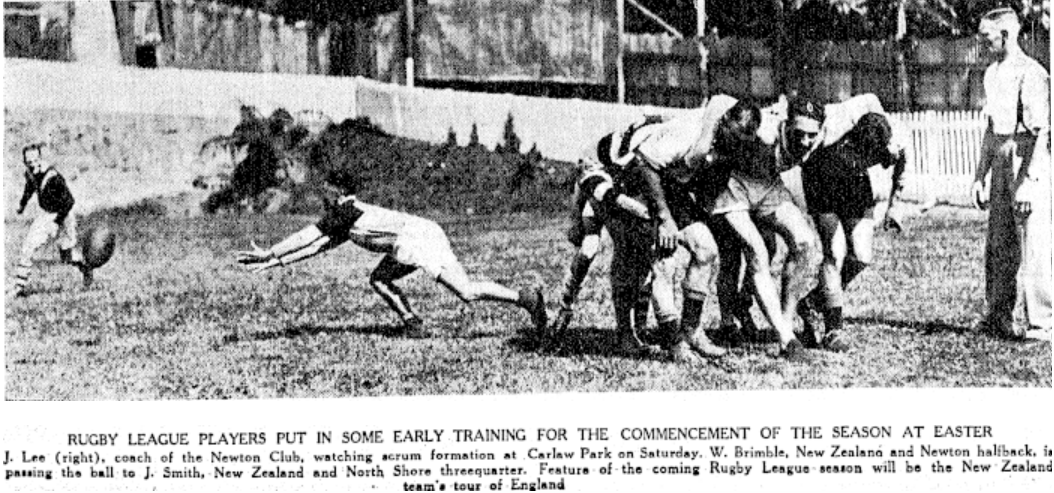
Mixed club preseason training in March with Wilfred Brimble passing from a scrum. Jack Smith is in the background.

North Shore opened their season on April 15 in 1939 with a 26-8 win over Ponsonby. Smith converted all four of their tries and kicked three penalties and “played an outstanding game” at fullback. He “was always sound”, “and often extracted his side from difficulties”. Smith “excelled as a goal kicker… and did splendid all-round work”. The Herald went on to say he “is a fine positional player, and knows how to open up the game for his three-quarters. He lacks nothing in defence, in spite of his light weight”. He kicked a penalty in their 7-0 win over Richmond a week later where he was “the best back on the ground”. With his defence being “superb” and he “ran for position and made a wonderful opening to make the try which put Shore firmly in the lead”. He gathered “the ball on the full in Richmond’s half [and] beat three or four opponents and then centre-kicked cleverly” after he had been angling for the corner with the Richmond forwards in pursuit. It allowed Edgar Morgan so score a simple try. His and Verdun Scott’s kicking “was much better than that of the Richmond players”. The newspaper went on to say that Smith “played an outstanding game at fullback. His handling and kicking were faultless, and he showed plenty of dash in racing up to start attacks. His fine grubber line kicks often gained valuable ground. On this form Smith seems assured of a place in the New Zealand team to tour England”. North Shore was well beaten by Manukau in round 4 by 23 to 7. Smith kicked a conversion and penalty. He was North Shore’s “best back” and was said to be “the outstanding league fullback in Auckland at the moment”. He “had a hard afternoon and came through with credit. One blemish was when he stopped [Jack] Brodrick and then allowed the Manukau forward to break away and score”. Smith was unable to play the following week against Marist after sustaining an injury.

Smith returned to play in round 6 in their 19-12 win over Newton where he converted their three tries and kicked two penalties. He kicked three more goals in a 15-12 win against Mount Albert on May 20. Smith “played another great game at fullback… and is the best in the competition at present”. During the second half he “saved a certain try when [Clarry] McNeil was grounded just short of the line”. Smith also showed “safe hands” when fielding kicks, and “played a fine all-round game”.

The New Zealand Herald named Smith on the wing in a hypothetical Auckland representative side at this stage of the season. His good kicking form continued in a 21-0 win over Papakura on May 27 where he kicked three conversions, two penalties, and a rare drop goal on the number 2 field at Carlaw Park. The Auckland Star said he “was in his brightest kicking mood. Indeed, it was largely Smith’s kicking which made the margin between the teams so wide”. Two of his goals were described as “remarkable” with one coming from 40 yards out, and his field goal was kicked from near half-way. In addition his “general play was good all round”. With the representative games approaching the Auckland Star speculated that “J. Smith, the North Shore player, is the logical choice at full-back, as at the moment he is the outstanding full-back in the game”. He scored a try and kicked 4 goals in North Shore’s 26-16 win over City on June 3. His goal kicking was described as “splendid” and “twice Smith was responsible for tries”. He “started a movement and scored a try from fullback, a rare feat”. Had it “not been for the splendid defence of Smith, the scores would have been much closer”. Prior to the match he had been named at fullback for the Auckland Pākehā side to play Auckland Māori on Monday, June 5. The Herald wrote “in the selection of the fullback, J. Smith, of North Shore, was the first choice for the Auckland team, and he will be opposed by George Nēpia, who us fit again after an injury to his arm some weeks ago. Against South Auckland last Sunday, Nepia played a brilliant game, and Smith will need to be right on his game to overshadow the famous Maori fullback”. As it so happened Smith was unable to play owing to an injury and his place at fullback was taken by his team mate Verdun Scott. Smith was available to play 5 days later on June 17 in North Shore’s 16-8 win over Ponsonby. He scored another try and kicked a conversion and a penalty. For his try he “showed splendid anticipation when he raced inside V. Scott, the centre, and caught the Ponsonby backs hopelessly out of position”. Overall he “was outstanding and saved his team by excellent fielding and good line-kicking”. He kicked three goals in a 9-8 win against Richmond a week later and “stood out” along with Richmond’s Dave Solomon. Smith “played the smooth, polished game which is expected of the best league fullback in New Zealand, fielding cleanly, placing his kicks with judgment, tackling unerringly and often running his supports into better position”. Smith kicked a conversion against Manukau in their round 13 win by 19 to 5. He was opposed by Manukau fullback George Nēpia and their play was “of a high standard”. Nepia claimed “a distinct advantage in duels of range-kicking with Smith”.

==== New Zealand trials and New Zealand selection ====
On July 7 the North Island side was chosen for their inter-island match along with NZ Possibles and Probables sides to play curtain raiser at Carlaw Park. Smith was selected in the Possibles side at fullback. Smith captained the Possibles side and kicked 4 goals in their 31-17 loss. He “was very safe at fullback… and his kicking was an asset”. Smith was named in the final trial match which was between Probable and Possible sides once more three days later on July 11. He kicked two goals in a 27-18 loss. The Auckland Star wrote that “there was a duel between J. Smith and T. Shaw, of South Auckland [Waikato], the fullbacks. Smith was faultless in his handling and placed his kicks with fine judgment”. He was “outstanding, and his clean fielding was a feature of the game”.

Then after a “nearly six hour” deliberation on the night of July 11 the New Zealand selectors, Scotty McClymont, Jack Redwood, and Jim Amos selected 18 of the 26 required for the tour. Smith was named as one of the two fullbacks along with Jack Hemi. In comments on his selection the Herald said Smith “at fullback, is one of the most discussed players in the game. He has played faultless football this season, and in Australia last year with the New Zealand team he played good games at five-eighths and on the wing”. He played in one final game for North Shore before the teams departure, an 18-5 loss to Marist where he kicked one penalty. He shared the fullback position with Verdun Scott who had also been selected for the tour. He had received a minor injury early in the game and moved to centre three-quarter with he and Scott swapping places.

==== New Zealand tour of England ====
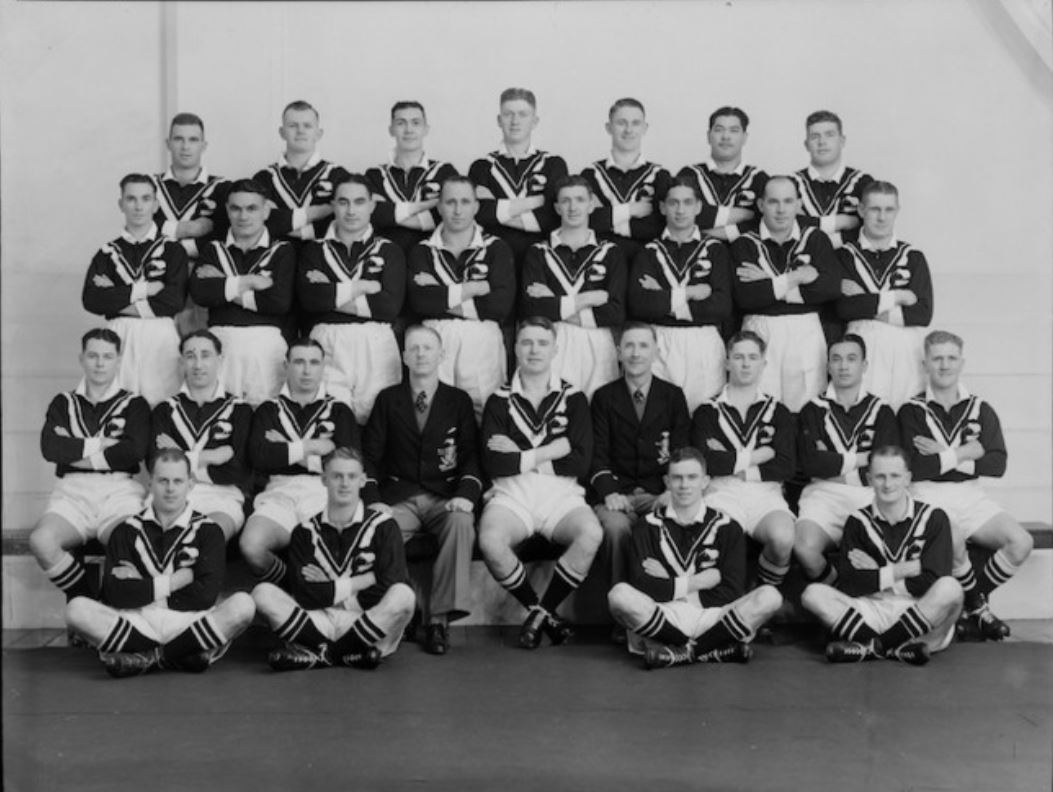
The New Zealand rugby league team to tour England in 1939-40.

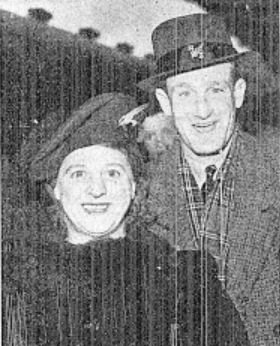
Smith at his departure with an unidentified woman. Possibly Mrs. C.E. Szeibalick.

In an Evening Star (Wellington) piece they wrote “when Jack Smith, Kiwi full-back reaches the North of England he will meet for the first time his well-known uncle, George Smith, regarded as one of the greatest wingers ever to play for New Zealand. The nephew promises to reach the same heights. Only 20 when he represented New Zealand last year, Jack Smith won golden Press notices from Australian critics, and his form in Auckland this year made him early acclaimed as certain to go to England. Smith is equally at home on the wing and at centre, as he is at fullback – altogether an extremely useful fellow to have in any side”.

Smith was working at the Self Help Co-op., Limited at the time and on the Saturday night before his departure they held a staff banquet at the New Savoy Hall. There they fair welled him and presented him “with a well filled wallet”. The Auckland members of the side got the Express train to Wellington on July 26 with photographs appearing of some of the touring group including Smith with a woman. The team departed Wellington for London on board the RMS Rangitiki in Tourist Class on Friday July 28.

The tour was to be cut very short however as Great Britain declared war on Germany. Smith did not play in the first tour match against St Helens on September 2. With war then declared the second match against Hull KR was cancelled. The team managed to organise to play Dewsbury on September 9 just prior to their return to New Zealand. Smith played on the wing in the match which New Zealand won 22-10 at Crown Flatt (Desbury) before a crowd of 6,200.

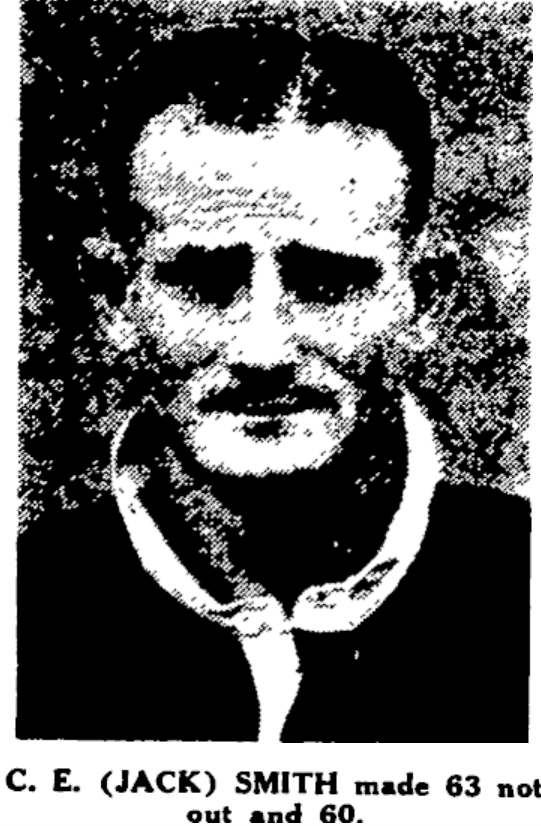

By the time they returned to New Zealand the domestic competition was over though there was a brief mention of him playing in a cricket match in December. A portrait photograph of him was published alongside it saying he scored 63 not out and 60 for Waipā in a match which was part of the Auckland Cricket Associations Country Week tournament at the Auckland Domain.

=== 1940 season ===
With World War 2 underway the representative program was scaled back with the main focus being on the club competition in Auckland. Smith played 18 games for North Shore in the 1940 season, scoring six tries and kicking 46 goals. He also played one game for the Auckland Pākehā side. The Auckland Star at the start of the season mentioned that North Shore would again have his services in their senior side.

His first game was in round 1 of the championship in a 16-10 win over Mount Albert where he scored a try, and kicked a conversion and four penalties in the main match at Carlaw Park on April 20. The Star wrote “J. Smith, the New Zealand representative, who went to England last year in the Dominion team, registered a fine performance in gathering 13 of Shore’s 16 points, his tally being a try and five goals. He played at centre with Verdun Scott at fullback and “they rose to every call made on them and were superlative in defence”. One of his penalty kicks early was “a brilliant” kick “from just inside halfway” while he “was a dominant figure in the backs, his good positional play foiling Mount Albert’s attempts at penetration”. He then kicked four more goals in a 20-12 win over Marist. He again played centre and “revealed his consistent form” and showed “splendid defence”. Three more goals followed for Smith in a 15-12 loss to Richmond in round 3. He started at centre but in the second half he was brought up to first five eighth to “keep an eye on” the brilliant young Abbie Graham who would become a Kiwi after the war in 1947. It was Smith and Scott who “saved North Shore repeatedly with good positional play and solid tackling” as the rest of the North Shore backs struggled to contain the likes of Graham, Dave Solomon, George Mitchell, and Wally Tittleton. North Shore then beat Ponsonby 19-6 on May 11 with Smith kicking two conversions and two penalties. Smith apparently spoiled the few chances the North Shore backs got by “running into the forwards”. Smith added 13 more points to his season tally when North Shore beat Papakura in round 5 by 37 points to 8. He and Bruce Donaldson “made gaps in the defence” as their combination “at five eighths was the deciding factor. This pair have become a splendid attacking force, which should prove a big asset in future games”.

Smith was then named by selectors Hec Brisbane, Bill Cloke, and Dougie McGregor at fullback in the Auckland Pākehā side to play Auckland Māori on June 8. He ultimately didn’t play in the match and it was later revealed that he had pulled a leg muscle, most likely in the June 1 win over City. He had kicked a solitary conversion in the game. He had “spoiled his supports’ prospects by holding on too long and running into trouble. Nevertheless, Smith, prior to being injured and retiring to the wing, gave valuable service defensively, and occasionally opened up the play for Donaldson”.

Despite being expected to miss their June 15 game against Newton he played though did not have kicking duties in their 12-8 win over Newton. He played in the five eighths again and he and L. Davis “concentrated on defence”. Smith had resumed goal kicking again by round 9 and kicked two goals in their 12-7 win over Manukau in the main match at Carlaw Park. He was said to be “a utility back of New Zealand class” and “went brilliantly at first five eighth”. Smith was paired with Eric Chatham and Chatham was said to have “sharpened up the attack considerably. He and J. Smith appear a happier combination than any possessed formerly this season, it being noticeable in some of the earlier games that the styles of the inside backs were inclined to clash”. The following week however the two of them struggled to break through the Mount Albert defence with Smith scoring all seven of their points in a 17-7 loss. They “tried desperately to shatter the opposing defence, alternating with lateral and straight running, but their efforts were usually frustrated before the ball had reached J. Greenwood at centre”. North Shore, who were leading the competition then recorded a 7-5 win over Marist with Smith kicking a penalty. He was said to be one of their best backs along with McArthur and Wilkie, and Smith supported Verdun Scott “excellently on defence”.

North Shore suffered their first loss in several weeks when Richmond defeated them 18-13. Smith kicked four goals in the loss. He was “at the moment kicking with greater accuracy than any other player in the game. He was lucky with one penalty shot. The ball struck the top side of the cross bar and then bounced over”. He was “solid at first five eighths… [and] attempted to put an edge on the attack with occasional straight running, but found the defence impregnable”. They lost again, 8-3 to Ponsonby with Smith playing at fullback due to an ongoing injury to Scott. He “gave a fine showing, fielding cleanly and kicking with good length and judgment. Smith’s positional play was good all through the match, and his defence was always above question”. They won their next match 33-5 against Papakura in round 14 with Smith scoring one of their seven tries and kicking three conversions. He was again at fullback and “played an outstanding game and started many effective movements”. North Shore beat City to stay in the championship race on August 10, but then on August 17 Richmond beat Marist to seal the competition with North Shore having a bye. North Shore then finished with a 13-7 loss to Manukau in the penultimate round, and a 33-15 win over Newton in the final round to finish runner up. The game against Newton was belatedly played several weeks later to find the runner up after they had finished tied with Mount Albert but had played one less game. Against Manukau he was “dependable at five eighths without being outstanding”. While against Newton he scored two tries and kicked four goals. With “one feature [being] the excellent play at five eighths and goal kicking of J. Smith, who scored 14 of his team’s points”. He was easily the outstanding player on the field and worried the opposition repeatedly with his strong and elusive running”.

==== Auckland Pākehā v Auckland Māori ====
Smith was named on the wing to play for Auckland Pākehā against Auckland Māori on August 31 at Carlaw Park. The Auckland Pākehā side won 27 to 6 before 5,000 spectators with Smith scoring two tries and kicking three penalties. A “feature of the game was the excellent display given by J. Smith, the Auckland wing-threequarter, who scored two very fine tries and kicked three goals”.

On September 14 they played Mount Albert in round 2 of the Roope Rooster knockout and lost 23-14. Lindsay Simons had returned from Wellington and this forced Verdun Scott and Smith up into the three quarter line with Smith on the wing. It was reported at this stage of the season that Smith had scored 108 total points for the season through 96 for North Shore and 12 for the Auckland Pākehā side. On September 28 North Shore again played Mount Albert, this time in round 3 of the Phelan Shield consolation knockout competition and lost again 10-9. Smith converted their only try and added two penalties. North Shore did finish the year on a high however when they beat Richmond 15-10 to win the Stormont Shield. The Auckland Star wrote “in addition to playing a fine positional game at full back … J. Smith gave his side great service by landing three goals, two from penalty kicks, and the other a try conversion. It was a contribution which was a big factor in the Shore victory. His place kicking was good, but not successful every time, as several shots skimmed by on the wrong side of the post”. While the Herald said “Smith, at fullback, gave one of the best displays seen at Carlaw Park this season. His excellent line kicking saved the forwards a lot of unnecessary running. His defence was superb”.

At the end of 1940 tragedy struck the Smith family with the death of Jack and Dick’s old brother Richard. He jumped from a boat that had left Whangarei endeavouring to reach the shore but was never sighted again and drowned aged 31.

=== 1941 season ===
Smith was named vice captain of North Shore for the 1941 season with Verdun Scott captaining the side. He went on to play 13 matches, scoring two tries and kicking 44 goals and a drop goal. Smith was drafted into the war effort and departed late in the season, playing for North Shore intermittently as well as playing some rugby games for Army sides. He also played one game for Auckland.

Their first game was a preliminary round game against Newton on April 19 which they won 21-5. The Auckland Star said “Jack Smith, one of the Kiwis in 1939, is still an elusive back, and will occupy his position as an allrounder for Shore”. He was “the pick of the backs” for North Shore along with Verdun Scott. Their second preliminary round game on April 26 saw a 28-8 win against Ponsonby with Smith kicking four goals. During the second half with the score 17-8 Smith received a head injury and had to be carried off the ground. He was subsequently left out of the North Shore side for their opening Fox Memorial Shield championship game a week later.

There was only one game played the following week and North Shore had the bye the week after so by the time of their second match against Ponsonby on May 24 Smith had recovered enough to play. He kicked four more goals in a 17-7 win and he, Scott, and B. McArthur covered “cleverly in the back line and regained ground by smart interception and nicely-timed kicking”.

At this time Jack’s brother Dick Smith was reinstated to the rugby league code and rejoined the North Shore team. Prior to North Shore’s next match against Richmond in round 4 the Auckland Star said that “the presence of J. Smith, the New Zealand representative player in the three quarter line will add to the Shore strategy”. Smith played at centre with Richmond winning 12-7. He kicked two penalties for the losers. The two teams had been unbeaten and the game saw high tempers especially among the forwards but Smith, McArthur, and Roy Clarke were “impressive” in the backs. He kicked six goals in their 27-3 win over Marist and “with incisive play broke through the Marist inside backs before he passed to Clark” who scored. He played a “prominent attacking role” at centre and was in “exceptional kicking form, several of the shots being from difficult angles”.

In round 6 Smith scored a try and kicked a conversion and three penalties in their 16-14 win against City and showed “subtlety in the centre”. The Star wrote that “in defeating City… North Shore owed a lot to J. Smith, its centre three-quarter, who in addition to maintaining goal kicking form, showed cleverness in constructive play. Smith got a very spectacular try, the result of interception in midfield. Smith worked out on a diagonal line to draw the defence, and then with a wide swerve in the opposite direction got through to score between the posts”. The Herald said that his try was “spectacular” and “his play throughout revealed polish”. Smith kicked another four conversions in North Shore’s 32-15 win against Papakura. The game was played at the Ellerslie Domain on June 21 and saw Smith play “well and make many fine openings”. Five more goals followed for Smith in their 32-12 win at Carlaw Park in round 8. He played “a fine game at centre”.

Smith was named in the reserves for the Auckland team to play South Auckland (Waikato) on July 12. It was said that he was playing as well as he did two seasons ago. He followed up with another impressive goal kicking effort against Mount Albert with five conversions and a penalty in their 30-8 win. He was “one of the outstanding players” with his “fielding being faultless”. Verdun Scott had gone off to military camp and Smith had moved back into his fullback position.

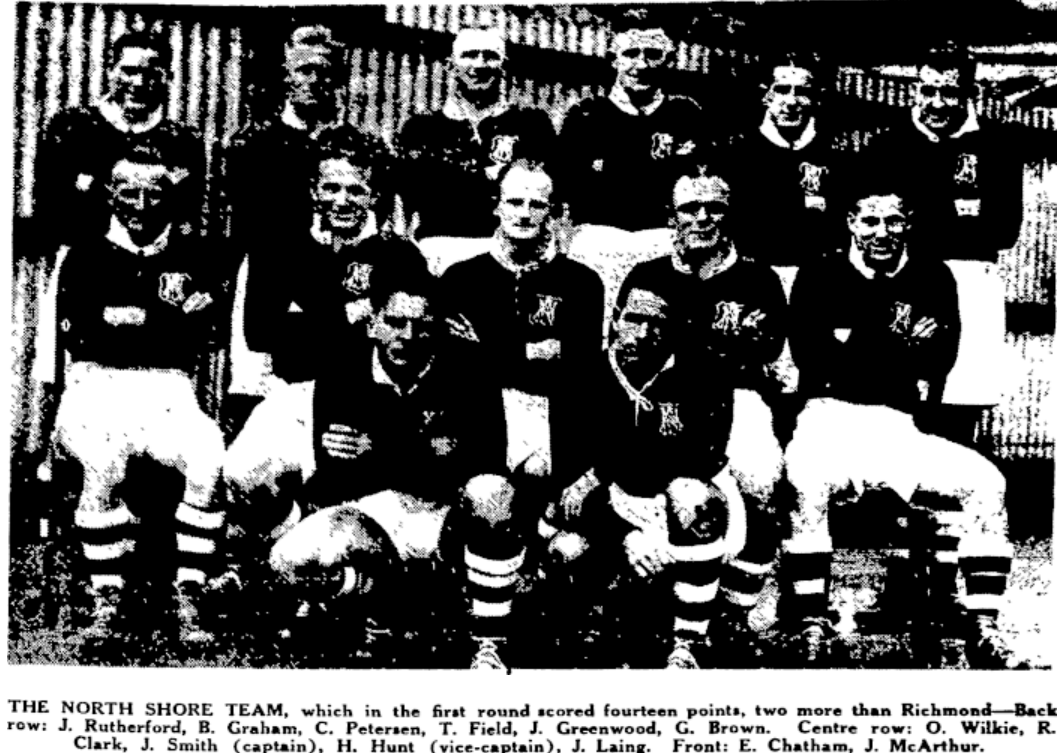
North Shore after winning the Rukutai Shield with Smith as captain.

While Scott was gone Smith took on the captaincy role. After winning the Rukutai Shield for leading after the first round a photograph was taken of the side at Carlaw Park. At fullback he “greatly assisted” North Shore and he “drove back the Mount Albert side with lengthy and accurate line-kicking, while his handling, tackling and positional play were first class”.

==== Auckland v South Auckland (Waikato) ====
After being named in the reserves originally for Auckland, Smith was pulled into the side for their match against South Auckland (Waikato) on July 12 after Brian Riley withdrew through an ankle injury. Auckland won 25-14 before a crowd of 9,500 with acting prime minister Walter Nash in attendance. Smith kicked three conversions and two penalties. It was said that he and Jack Hemi were “disappointing among the Auckland backs”, “in the first half, particularly, their handling was very weak, and this gave the visitors two tries. Smith went from wing threequarter to fullback in the second half, and Hemi did better on the wing”.

The following week in their round 10 match North Shore lost 22-7 to Manukau. Smith, playing at fullback kicked two goals. He “was not at his best at fullback, but his task was not an easy one with the backs showing weakness in handling and slowness in backing up”. In a brief piece in the Auckland Star it was said that “Jack Smith (North Shore) headed the league point-getters after last Saturday’s play, with 69 points, comprised of 33 goals and one try. This performance illustrates what a stalwart he has been to the leading team in the championship”.

==== Papakura Rugby (Army) and North Shore champions ====
Smith had been drafted into the war effort during 1941 and spent time at the army camp at Papakura. While there he played the occasional game for their rugby union side and played for North Shore when he was not in camp. The Star wrote prior to the Papakura Army’s July 26 game against Grammar at Eden Park that “the Army Rugby team has a noted recruit for its match ... in J. Smith, the Auckland and New Zealand league representative. He will fill the role of fullback, a position which a number of players have filled during the season with varying success for the Army. Smith is a class player in the league game”. His Army side beat Grammar 16-12 with Smith kicking two conversions. His “line kicking saved his forwards a lot of running about” and he “was most impressive with his long range kicking”.

It was reported that “in its backs North Shore has lost V. Scott and J. Smith, both representative players, who have gone to camp, and their places have been hard to fill”. Smith did however return to their side for their following match against Ponsonby on August 2. He kicked a goal in an 8-8 draw and “handled cleanly, kicked well for the gaps, and showed good positional play on occasions by running the shore backs into position”. Then mid week he played for the Papakura Army side again in a match against a Hopuhopu army camp side, and kicked two penalties and a conversion in a 14-10 win.

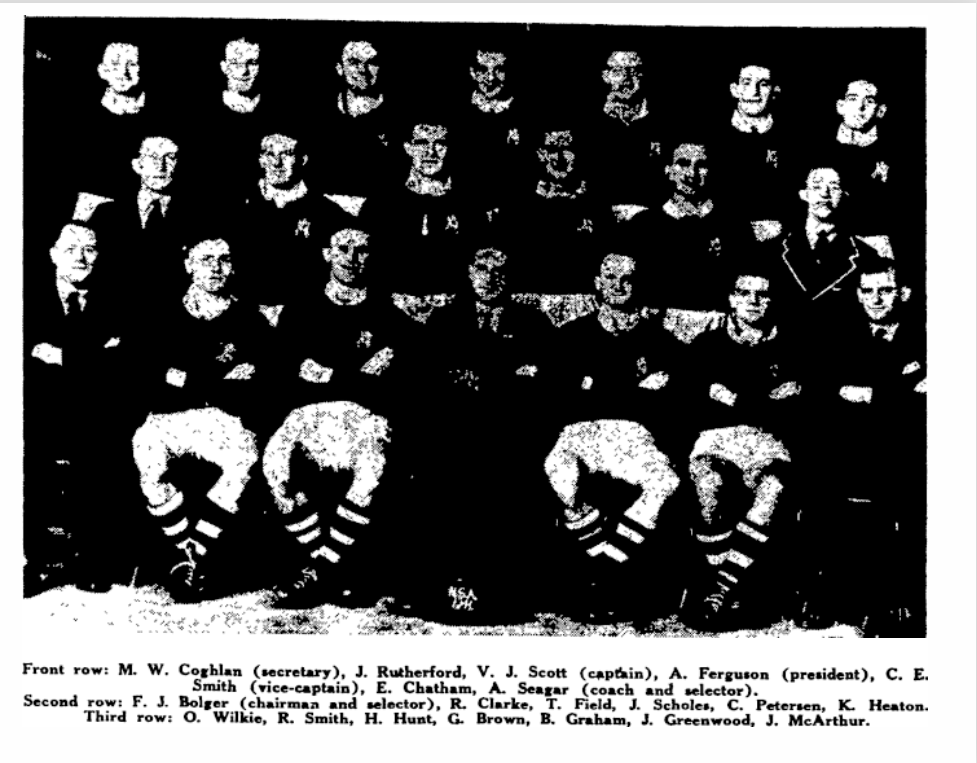

Smith was unavailable to play for North Shore for several weeks with his brother Dick Smith filling his place. Jack did return to North Shore for their round 17 win over Papakura 35-5 and he scored a try and kicked four conversions. He played fullback and “figured prominently in several back movements” and “played a sound game”. North Shore had a one point lead in the championship with one round remaining and they secured the Fox Memorial Shield with a 19-9 win over Newton on September 13 at Carlaw Park. Smith kicked two conversions, two penalties, and a drop goal. Interestingly the Papakura Army side also won the Gallaher Shield title for the Auckland rugby championship meaning Smith was in an extremely unique position of having played for the teams which simultaneous won the competition in two different codes.

== Smith serving in World War 2 ==
Smith was drafted in early July 1941 and ordered to report to Drill Hall on Rutland Street in central Auckland. He was then to travel to the Papakura Army Camp for training. Sometime around mid to late September Smith departed New Zealand for the Middle East where he joined the war effort. He was a Corporal in the Infantry Brigade and part of the Second New Zealand Expeditionary Force. It was reported from Cairo, Egypt on November 20 that he played rugby for New Zealand’s Northern Infantry Training Depot against the Australian Imperial Force Unit. The New Zealand side won 24-11 with “J. Smith, a former New Zealand league player, giving a sound display at fullback”.

Then in early December a letter was received from Second Lieutenant Ronald Bush stating that he was chosen as vice-captain of the Central Rugby team that was to meet the Northern fifteen in a day or two’s time. And that the Northern team included some well known players such as Hubert McLean, A. Brown, A. McBeath, Laurie Curtayne who were all Auckland representatives, with McLean also being an All Black, along with Jack Smith. Smith scored all nine of the Northern Infantry sides points from kicks. Then against the Middle East Signals School team he kicked three conversions and two penalties around the new year.

On May 11, 1943 the New Zealand Herald reported that Smith was missing. The piece stated “corporal C.E. (Jack) Smith, reported missing, is the third son of Mrs. C.E. Sweibruck, 14 Cecil Road, Milford. He is well known in rugby league football circles, having represented New Zealand in both the fullback and wing positions. A stalwart of the Devonport club, he toured Australia with the Kiwis in 1938 and England in 1939, the latter tour being cancelled after the second match owing to the outbreak of war. Smith, who is 25 years of age was educated at the Devonport Primary School and Takapuna Grammar School, where he took a prominent part in athletics. He also played rugby for the Papakura Army team which won the Auckland championship in 1941. Plainly he was later found safe as in January 1944 he was named as one of six New Zealanders to play in a “Rest of Egypt” side to play the unbeaten South Africa Divisional team at Alamein later in the month of January. It was then reported in early March that Smith was part of the Second N.Z.E.F. side which beat the Rest of Egypt which at this stage included some of the South African players in their unbeaten divisional team. Smith kicked a penalty goal in their 9-7 win which took place in Alexandria. In February of 1945 Smith played for the New Zealand Advance Base side which lost 15 to 6 to the United Services’ team which “fielded three English representatives – F. Millar, A.J. Pimblett (rugby league), and R.E. Prescott, captain of the Harlequins and England – and other representatives in L. Bennett (Wales), L. du Toit and Hayman (South Africa). Smith’s side included W. O’Byrne (Taranaki), P.H. Baker (Canterbury), and J.B. Simpson (Auckland). Smith kicked a penalty in the defeat.

Smith returned from the war in early September 1945. The boat arrived in Wellington and then Smith was part of a large contingent of returning soldiers who travelled by train to Auckland. He was awarded the War Medal 1939-1945 and the New Zealand War Service Medal.

== Return to North Shore side and North Island selection ==
After arriving back from the war Smith immediately resumed his rugby league career. An advertisement appeared in several newspapers by the Auckland Rugby League promoting the North Shore v Mount Albert game which featured Smith and Verdun Scott’s names. It said “Jack Smith and Verdun Scott, two of the most brilliant products of the league code have returned from overseas in fine form”. The match was a Roope Rooster semi final and North Shore won on September 22 by 17 points to 12. Smith kicked two conversions and two penalties. The Auckland Star wrote that “for the occasion North Shore put in its best team of the season, the reinforcement including Verdun Scott, J. Smith and Ivor Stirling…”. Smith produced “clever tactical play” at fullback, “was in splendid kicking form”, and “revealed a lot of his former ability”. North Shore then beat Richmond 22-12 in the Roope Rooster final a week later on September 9. Smith converted two tries and kicked three penalties. Late in the game he had to go off with an injury but before then he “played a faultless game at fullback. His placements were good and effective”. Smith had been selected in the reserves for the Auckland side to play South Auckland (Waikato) in Huntly but he was not required to play and instead played for North Shore in their final on the same day.

Smith was then a surprise selection in the North Island side for their inter-island match on October 6. Warwick Clarke had been the form fullback during the season but Smith was chosen ahead of him by selectors Scotty McClymont, Ernie Asher, and C. Siddle. Before a crowd of 15 to 20,000 at Carlaw Park the North Island won 18 to 8. Smith converted two of their four tries and also kicked a penalty. Much of the interest in the game was “centred in the displays of the fullbacks, J. Smith and J. Soster. Their handling of the ball was often brilliant and Smith helped to make North’s third try by joining in at the end of a run and bringing the play back to the forwards. Smith’s tactical play and knowledge of the offside rule thwarted the opposing forwards, but he had nothing on his younger West Coast rival in all-round play”. The Herald wrote that they both “gave high class displays and their fielding was flawless”.

Smith’s final game of the season was in the Stormont Shield final against Otahuhu on October 20. North Shore won the trophy with a 15-13 win. Smith kicking two conversions and a penalty. He “played well in the first spell at fullback… but later his form was not so consistent” in a “gusty wind”.

== Personal life ==
Jack Smith was working as a clerk at the time of his selection for the 1939 New Zealand team. He was working as a grocer at the time of his enlistment in the military in July 1941. His address was listed as 20 Broadway, Auckland. His next of kin was listed as Mrs. C.E. Szeibalick and she was living on Shakespeare Rd., in Milford, Auckland. Jack married Jean Constance Hunter on August 24, 1946 and they had four children, a daughter and three sons (Bryan, Terry, and Graham). His son Bryan went on to become the principal of Papakura High School from 1994 to 2012. The census records of 1949 showed that Jack and Jean were living at 42 King Edward Avenue and working as a clerk.

Charles Ernest (Jack) Smith died on Thursday, September 10, 1970 at Auckland Hospital aged 52. He was managing the University rugby league senior side at the time of his death.
