= Jackie Smith (softball) =

New Zealand softball player

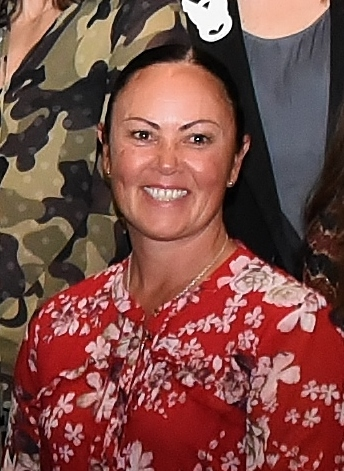
- Smith in 2018

Personal information
- Born: 13 November 1969 (age 56) Auckland, New Zealand

Sport
- Country: New Zealand
- Sport: Softball

Jackie Smith (born 13 November 1969) is a New Zealand softball player. She competed at the 2000 Summer Olympics in Sydney, where the New Zealand team placed sixth in the women's softball tournament.
