= Jack Smith (coach) =

American football, baseball and basketball coach

Jack McDonald
Coaching career (HC unless noted)

Football
- 1947–1949: Hofstra

Basketball
- 1943–1946: Hofstra

Baseball
- 1943–1962: Hofstra

Administrative career (AD unless noted)
- 1942–1945: Hofstra (interim AD)
- 1948–1951: Hofstra

Head coaching record
- Overall: 6–14–3 (football); 27–32 (basketball); 179–140–6 (baseball)

John Archer Smith is a former coach for Hofstra University's football, baseball and basketball programs. Smith earned 179 wins as the baseball coach for Hofstra, the most in the program's history, with a win percentage of .560.

== Head coaching record ==
=== Football ===
Year	Team	Overall	Conference	Standing	Bowl/playoffs
Hofstra Flying Dutchmen (Independent) (1947–1949)
1947	Hofstra	5–3			
1948	Hofstra	0–6–2			
1949	Hofstra	1–5–1			
Hofstra:		6–14–3			
Total:		6–14–3			
