= Jack Smith (Australian footballer, born 1881) =

Australian rules footballer (1881–1927)

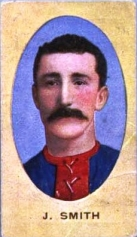

Personal information
- Full name: John Thomas Smith
- Born: 22 June 1881; South Melbourne, Victoria
- Died: 10 December 1927 (aged 46); Heidelberg, Victoria
- Position: Half forward/Rover

Playing career^{1}
Years	Club	Games (Goals)
1907–09, 1911	Melbourne	51 (27)
- ^{1} Playing statistics correct to the end of 1911.

John Thomas Smith (22 June 1881 – 10 December 1927) was an Australian rules footballer who played with Melbourne in the Victorian Football League (VFL).

== Family ==
The son of Alfred Smith (1847–1923), and Mary Anne Smith (1855–1896), née Heslem, John Thomas Smith was born on 22 June 1881.

He married Alice Bell (1875–1960) in 1910.

== Football ==
=== North Melbourne (VFA) ===
He played 85 games, and scored 33 goals for North Melbourne in the Victorian Football Association (VFA) from 1898 to 1906; and he was captain of the team in 1905 and 1906.

=== Melbourne (VFL) ===
He was cleared from North Melbourne to Melbourne in the Victorian Football League (VFL) in 1907. He played 41 games, and kicked 26 goals in three seasons (1907 to 1909).

=== Launceston (NTFA) ===
Cleared from Melbourne to the Launceston Football Club in the Northern Tasmanian Football Association (NTFA), he served as its captain-coach in 1910.

=== Melbourne (VFL) ===
He returned to Melbourne in 1911, and played another 10 games during the 1911 season.

=== Cananore (TSL) ===
He was cleared from Melbourne to captain-coach the Cananore Football Club in the Tasmanian State League (TSL) in 1912.
