= John Smith (footballer, born 1901) =

English footballer

Personal information
- Date of birth: 1901
- Place of birth: Eccleshill, England
- Position: Forward

Senior career*
Years	Team	Apps	(Gls)
- Harrogate Amateurs
1923–1926	Bradford City	38	(6)
- Blackburn Rovers
Total		38	(6)
- * Club domestic league appearances and goals

John Smith (born 1901) was an English professional footballer who played as a forward.

== Career ==
Born in Eccleshill, Smith moved from Harrogate Amateurs to Bradford City in August 1923. He made 38 league appearances for the club, scoring 6 goals, before signing for Blackburn Rovers in August 1926.

== Sources ==
- Frost, Terry (1988). Bradford City A Complete Record 1903–1988. Breedon Books Sport. ISBN 0-907969-38-0.
