= Jack Smith (Australian footballer, born 1909) =

Australian rules footballer, born 1909

Personal information
- Full name: Allan John Joseph Smith
- Born: 29 August 1909; South Yarra, Victoria
- Died: 1 July 1983 (aged 73); Adelaide, South Australia
- Height: 180 cm (5 ft 11 in)
- Weight: 79 kg (174 lb)
- Position: Wing

Playing career^{1}
Years	Club	Games (Goals)
1930–31	St Kilda	9 (8)
1932–37	North Melbourne	62 (26)
1938	West Torrens (SANFL)	7 (12)
1939	Norwood (SANFL)	4 (2)
- ^{1} Playing statistics correct to the end of 1939.

Allan John Joseph 'Jack' Smith (29 August 1909 – 1 July 1983) was an Australian rules footballer who played with St Kilda and North Melbourne in the Victorian Football League (VFL).
