= Jack Smith (Australian cricketer) =

Australian cricketer (born 1977)

Personal information
- Born: 22 May 1977 (age 49); Port Noarlunga, South Australia
- Source: Cricinfo, 25 September 2020

Jack Smith (born 22 May 1977) is an Australian cricketer and top order batsman. Prime Ministers XI top scorer in 2001 versus New Zealand {cite web url=https://www.espncricinfo.com/series/new-zealand-tour-of-australia-2001-02-62085/prime-minister-s-xi-vs-new-zealanders-97572/full-scorecard}, following his 156 against the touring Black Caps in the same season {cite web url=https://www.espncricinfo.com/series/new-zealand-tour-of-australia-2001-02-62085/australian-capital-territory-president-s-xii-vs-new-zealanders-109236/full-scorecard}. Australian Cricket Academy scholar in 2002 {cite web url=https://www.espncricinfo.com/story/acb-and-ais-announce-2002-commonwealth-bank-cricket-academy-intake-120209}. He played in four first-class and four List A matches for South Australia in 2004. Smith made his first class cricket debut in 2004, South Australia vs Victoria. This initiated Smith's professional domestic career.

== See also ==
- List of South Australian representative cricketers
