= 1935 Auckland Rugby League season =

27th rugby tournament in Auckland, NZ

The 1935 Auckland Rugby League season was its 27th. The senior championship was again won by the Richmond Rovers who won their first Fox Memorial title the previous season. They were level with Mount Albert after 12 matches and they played off with Richmond winning 14–9. Despite their loss this was a significant achievement by Mount Albert who were in their first season in the senior first grade.

Newton Rangers who were in a revival after several poor seasons won the Roope Rooster trophy for the third time in their history with a 10–8 win over Richmond. They previously won it in 1919 and 1920. This qualified them to play against Richmond in the Stormont Shield match. They lost 26–15 to hand Richmond their second straight Stormont Shield title. Ponsonby United won the Phelan Shield for teams who had been eliminated after the first round of the Roope Rooster with an 11–8 win over Mount Albert. Marist Old Boys won the reserve grade competition (Norton Cup) after defeating Richmond Rovers in the final by 3 points to 0. They also won the Stallard Cup when they won the knockout competition which also involved some of the Senior B teams. Mount Albert won the Thistle Cup by scoring the most competition points in the second round of the Fox Memorial competition. Robert Morrissey of Mount Albert won the champion goal kicker award after he kicked 37 goals in the Fox Memorial and Roope Rooster competitions.

The reinstated Senior B competition (Sharman Cup) was won by Otahuhu with an 8 win, 1 loss record with Papakura second with 7 wins and 2 losses. Left trailing well behind was Point Chevalier, and Waiuku with a single win and 7 losses each. At the end of the season the newly formed Green Lane senior side joined these 4 sides in the Senior B knockout competition. They performed well losing narrowly to Papakura and Point Chevalier, and defeating Waiuku to finish 4th of the 5 sides. The knockout competition was won by Papakura. This competition was followed by the Walmsley Shield matches which Papakura won 6–2 over Green Lane in the final.

The representative season was marked by the clash between Auckland and Australia who were touring New Zealand for the first time in 16 years. Auckland went down in an entertaining match 8–16. There were several trial matches played as the selectors looked to find the best possible XIII's to represent both Auckland and the North Island. Auckland also went on a brief 'Southern' tour where they had wins over Wellington and Canterbury. The representative season was finished with an Auckland Province loss to Australia 18–36.

Preceded by 1934	27th Auckland Rugby League season 1935	Succeeded by 1936

== Season News ==
=== Club teams by grade participation ===
Team	Fox Memorial	Senior Reserves	Senior B	2nd	3rd	4th	5th	6th	7th	Schools	Total
Richmond Rovers	1	1	0	1	1	1	2	1	1	1	10
City Rovers	1	1	0	0	1	1	0	1	1	1	7
Devonport United	1	1	0	0	1	0	1	1	0	1	6
Mount Albert United	1	1	0	1	0	1	1	0	0	0	5
Marist Old Boys	1	1	0	0	2	0	0	0	0	1	5
Ponsonby United	1	1	0	1	1	1	0	0	0	0	5
Newton Rangers	1	1	0	0	0	1	1	0	0	0	4
Papakura	0	0	1	1	0	1	1	0	0	0	4
Point Chevalier	0	0	1	0	0	2	0	1	0	0	4
Otahuhu Rovers	0	0	1	0	1	1	0	0	0	1	4
Akarana	0	0	0	0	2	0	1	0	0	1	4
Northcote & Birkenhead Ramblers	0	0	0	0	1	1	0	1	0	1	4
Ellerslie United	0	0	0	0	1	0	1	0	1	1	4
Green Lane	0	0	1	0	1	0	0	0	0	2	4
Glenora	0	0	0	1	0	1	0	1	0	0	3
Manukau Rovers	0	0	0	1	2	0	0	0	0	0	3
Avondale	0	0	0	0	0	0	0	0	1	1	2
Waiuku	0	0	1	0	0	0	0	0	0	0	1
R.V.	0	0	0	1	0	0	0	0	0	0	1
Avondale Convent (School)	0	0	0	0	0	0	0	0	0	1	1
Total	7	7	5	7	14	11	8	6	4	12	81

=== Annual meeting ===
At the annual meeting on April 9 the report and balance sheet was presented. It was noted that despite there being rain on ten Saturdays during the 1934 season there was a “marked increase in ground and grandstand receipts”. The working account balance had improved from £762 7/9 in 1933 to £1,254 0/9 by the end of 1934 with gate and grandstand returns totalling £2,814 10/3. The league's assets were valued at £10,983 16/7 made up from Carlaw Park (£6,980 11/2), grandstand (£3,686 10/9), furniture and fittings (£101 6/2), and plant and gear (£181 13/10), which left a profit of £435 18/4. Adjustments to the players’ insurance scheme and fewer accidents saw a saving of over £70. The league gave £429 17/3 to the clubs which was slightly up on the 1933 season. The report also noted the retirement of Messrs. F. Ellis (treasurer), T. Davis (secretary, Junior Control Board), and to Mr. Vic Simpson (secretary, Referees Association). The following were elected as officers for the 1935 season: patron, Mr. J.B. Donald; vice-patron, Mr. J.F.W. Dickson; president, James Carlaw; chairman, Mr. Grey Campbell; deputy chairman, Ted Phelan; vice-presidents, Messrs R.D. Bagnall, R. Benson, J. Bellamy, O. Blackwood, J. Donald, C. Drysdale, H. Grange, R.J. Laird, W.J. Lovett, John A. Lee (M.P.), J. Montgomery, E. Morton, Joe Sayegh, C. Seagar, Bill Schramm (M.P.), R.T. Sharman, W. Wallace, H. Walmsley, G.T. Wright, R.H. Wood, G.C.Gilmore, and Webb; club delegates to the board of control, J.W. Probert, and Jim Rukutai; referees’ delegate, William Mincham. In mid April Mr. Ernest Davis, and Mr. T.G. Symonds (managing director of George Court and Sons Ltd.) were elected vice-presidents of ARL. The 3rd annual Auckland Rugby League ball was held on October 2 at the Peter Pan Cabaret. Members of the touring Australian team were in attendance and the combined colours of the Auckland clubs were used to decorate the ballroom.

The following were elected to the ARL Board of Control: hon secretary, Mr. Ivan Culpan; hon treasurer, Mr. J.E. Knowling; New Zealand Council delegate, Mr. R. Doble; hon solicitor, Mr. H.M. Rogerson; press steward, Mr. R. Doble; hon. auditor, Mr. R.A. Spinley; hon physicians, Drs. Tracey Inglis, Pezaro, Gwynne, Holdgate, Waddell, Burrell, and Locke; hon masseur, Mr. F. Flannagan; timekeepers, Messrs. W. Liversidge and A.E. Chapman; referees appointment board, Mr. L Binns and Wilkie; emergency committee, the chairman, secretary and Mr. Rukutai; finance committee, the chairman, secretary and Messrs. Probert and William Mincham. In mid April Mr. Ernest Davis, and Mr. T.G. Symonds (managing director of George Court and Sons Ltd.) were elected vice-presidents of ARL.

=== State of the game ===
At the dinner for the Taranaki and South Auckland teams following their representative matches with Auckland and Auckland B on August 3 a dinner was held in their honour. Present was the Minister of Education, Hon. Sydney George Smith, who spoke of the importance of sport in helping New Zealand through difficult times. Later in the evening Mr. E. Stallworthy “expressed a hope that no discrimination would be made in schools in the matter of organised sport”... and “drew the Minister's attention to the fact that sometimes teachers had seemed somewhat biased against rugby league football, and he hoped that the ruling of his predecessor that any penalty imposed on a boy for following his desires in sport, or obstruction thereto, would be a matter for serious inquiry”. The Minister responded “I may say that I have no objection to any code of football being played in the schools”. And he then went on the explain how the responsibility lay in the case of primary schools with the education board of the district, and for secondary schools with their governing boards. He said that headmasters and teachers would be unwise to go against the desires of parents and their children in regards to wanting to play any particular game.

At a social function at Masterton on July 24 Bert Cooke spoke about the league and union codes. He said that most of the rumours about large sums in connection with league were pure imagination. He went on to say that the league code was drawing thousands in Auckland where rugby drew hundreds and that there was no doubt which game the Northerners would sooner watch. Describing the game as being "faster, cleaner and a more brainy game altogether, but players required to be very fit. Nevertheless, he did not anticipate that league would make as great progress elsewhere as in Auckland".

=== Broadcasting of matches ===
At the board of control meeting on April 17 it was decided to broadcast matches from Carlaw Park through the 1ZB station.

=== Trainings ===
At their first board of control meeting on April 10 the chairman suggested that clubs try to get their own training grounds where possible so that they could train harder and develop tactics without other teams training nearby seeing them. This was difficult to do at Carlaw Park with many teams training at the same time. It was also decided that school boys would not be allowed to train after 7pm owing to the needs of other teams.

=== Reintroduction of the Senior B grade ===
At the board of control meeting on March 6 it was decided to create a Senior B Grade. There had been one for several seasons but after the senior competition was restructured in 1931 to include 6 clubs with reserve grade teams beneath them the Senior B clubs were relegated to the second Grade competition. It was recommended by the junior management secretary, Mr. W.F. Clarke that players in the Senior B grade would have the same status as Senior A players with regard to regrading. It was suggested that the Sharman Cup be donated for the Senior B championship, and the Foster Shield for the knockout competition. The third open grade would be eliminated and now effectively become the second grade (which had been superseded by the Senior B grade). The third grade would still have a weighted grade competition. It was also decided that the winner of the grade would have the right to enter the Roope Rooster competition. Otahuhu United won the competition and played a friendly match with Ponsonby United before losing to Newton Rangers in the first round of the Roope Rooster. At the April 17 board of control meeting there was considerable debate about whether the winners of the Senior B grade should be allowed to play the last placed team in the Fox Memorial competition, even if there was no consequence to the game. From 1927 to 29 promotion-relegation games were played between these teams but were ceased). It was generally decided that it would be unfair for the last placed team in the top division to have such dire consequences hanging over them. It was also noted that the winning Senior B team could compete in the Roope Rooster competition anyway. At the Junior Management Committee meeting of April 23 it was reported that there would be six teams in the senior B grade - Papatoetoe, Otahuhu, Ellerslie, Point Chevalier, Richmond, and Waiuku. Waiuku were a new club and struggled in the competition for two seasons before the sub-league that they had formed amalgamated with the Tuakau sub-league in early 1937, while Richmond's entry was described as “a fresh city side”. Ultimately Papatoetoe dd not field a side meaning there were 5 teams and 1 bye each round. It was felt later in the season that Waiuku had been so ambitious in fielding a Senior B side when they were a fledging club and would have been better placed fielding their team in the second Grade.

=== Application by Mount Albert United for senior status ===
At the first meeting of the Auckland Rugby League Board of Control on February 27 the Mount Albert United club applied for senior status. Chairman G. Grey Campbell said that the constitution allowed only six senior clubs and if there was to be an alteration there would need to be a notice of motion, along with a meeting of club delegates, with the Board of Control having the final say. The Mount Albert delegates Mr J. Johnson and G.H. Shaw said that the club wished a decision to be made early as they needed to organise before the season started and that they “would field first class senior and reserve grade teams, with much district support”. At the boards first official meeting on April 10 it was decided to admit the Mount Albert United club to the senior grade which meant it would consist of 7 teams. Mr. G. Grey Campbell said that he had looked at the names of the players which Mount Albert had submitted and they were all well recognised seniors. He also stated that there was a “strict reservation that this season no transfers from any other rugby league club be allowed, the idea being that a new club should not be strengthened at the expense of the existing clubs, which should be protected”. He also went on to say that “he felt sure Mount Albert would bring life to the competition and there were great possibilities behind the move”. Mr. R Doble spoke in support of the application by Mount Albert. On the motion of Mr. Probert to admit Mount Albert it was confirmed by vote.

=== R.V. Club formation ===
The R.V. were formed and entered. They competed from 1935 until 1942. They represented the Alex Harvey & Son's Ltd. business which had three factories and were mostly based in the inner city area. The initials "R.V." was a play on the name 'Harvey' with the middle letters and sound of the word. The Harvey family was heavily involved in the club officially. In 1936 they won the Hayward Shield 2nd grade competition. The war hurt their senior playing numbers and by 1940 they were only fielding schoolboy sides before ceasing to exist by 1943. The business did however continue to field teams in soccer and cricket competitions.

=== Rules ===
At the board of control meeting on May 1 after the consideration of reports it was “decided to advise senior clubs that the new play the ball and hooking rules would be more rigidly enforced from next Saturday”. Players would be given the opportunity to “brush up” on the rules by attending referee demonstrations on Tuesday and Thursday evenings. It was scheduled that all coaches and team captains would meet on April 24 at a Referees Association conference to discuss the new amendments to the playing rules. The play the ball rule stated that “players playing the ball must keep both feet on the ground until the ball has been placed thereon and the players acting as respective halfbacks must stand one yard behind the player playing the ball. All other players must not approach within three yards and be behind the acting halfbacks”. In addition to this the “offside rule of five yards radius within which players are offside is now increased to 10 yards”. While a drop out from touch now necessitated that “the attacking player must stand five yards away from the goal line, and when the game is restarted the ball must be kicked from behind the goal posts, and must reach this five yard mark. Formerly the attacking player stood on the goal line”.

At a control board meeting on May 8 there was a question from a club regarding injured players and replacements. The response was: “(1) An injured player can be replaced up to the end of the first spell; (2) an injured player is one incapable of carrying on in play; (3) a team which plays twelve players in the first half is entitled to add a player, even in the second half, because the laws of the game provide for thirteen men a side; (4) players or officials of a club are not entitled to convene meetings of players with members of another club”.

After complaints from junior grades regarding players wearing boots with illegal sprigs the referees association said that they had no right to police this. However the referees association received official advice from the control board meeting on May 20 that they did indeed have the right to inspect players boots to ensure that boots, whether "Bakelite or Aluminium were not dangerous".

On August 5 at the ARL Referees’ Association meeting Mr. W. Mincham reported that the control board had ruled that a player leaving the field sick could not be replaced, but an injured player could be. The matter had arisen after an incident in a third grade match at Victoria Park. Mr Saunders, the referee said that the "ambulance man" had told him that the player was "suffering from concussion as well as influenza" and the matter had been misreported to the control board.

=== Carlaw Park ===
In May the City Rovers club wrote a letter to the Board of Control saying that the terrace fence was dangerous. The league responded that they realised this and that work would be undertaken on the fence “as soon as funds permitted”.

Club flags were discussed at the 26 June meeting and the chairman suggested that a "flag-pole be erected near the scoreboard ... to indicate by the flying of a pennant the team leading during the progress of the main game. Mr Campbell said the idea was one given him by Mr. Horrie Miller. The suggestion was adopted". Mr Miller was the secretary of New South Wales Rugby League and had recently visited New Zealand. It was decided at the July 3 ARL meeting to address the flagpole next to the score-board proposal next season as the chairman said that it was "also proposed to improve the present score-board".

Referees had money and other items stolen from their dressing rooms during matches at Carlaw Park and at the July 3 ARL meeting it was decided that the issue of unauthorised people gaining "admittance to the dressing rooms" needed to be addressed and was referred to a sub-committee for investigation.

Following the North Island v South Island match on August 17 the ARL reported that the takings for club matches at Carlaw Park were "just over £500 better than those in 1934" and that "during the past ten weeks heavy rain had fallen each Saturday, otherwise the figures would have been even more satisfactory".

=== Jersey Colours ===
After several issues in junior matches where both teams wore uniforms of a similar nature confusing players, the referee, and spectators alike the league decided to form a 'colours committee' to look into the matter. Mr. D. Wilkie said "after full deliberation ... it was suggested that the Otahuhu club's jerseys be taken over and an alteration be made to Glenora jerseys. It was agreed that Ponsonby should retain their present colours. In connection with the clash of colours between City Rovers and Ellerslie, the former club had decided to differentiate by equipping their teams with white shorts". Otahuhu would be "suitably recompensed" for their forced change. The committee also thought that they should compile a register with all the details regarding colours and width of bands on jerseys and other particulars. Their recommendations were adopted and the colours committee were given authority to file patterns from jersey manufacturers in the register for reference. They then examined samples of the new Auckland representative jerseys and deferred their decision on them. At the June 19 board meeting Green Lane's uniform colours were registered as emerald green, black, and white.

=== Player losses to English professional teams ===
In the off-season Newton Rangers lost the services of Mortimer Stephens and Cyril Blacklaws who were signed by St Helens. Stephens was from South Auckland and had originally played rugby league for Papakura. He represented Auckland and the North Island side in 1934. Blacklaws had also started his rugby league at Papakura before joining Newton. They both spent some time at St Helens before later signing for Rochdale Hornets. Later Mortimer Stephens son Owen became a representative rugby player, playing for the All Blacks, and the Wallabies, before switching to rugby league and playing for Parramatta and Wakefield Trinity in the 1970s.

=== Bert Cooke's retirement ===
At a social evening in Masterton on July 24 Bert Cooke had intimated that this season would be his last. He said that beyond the season he would "probably be wandering about in plus fours, carrying a bag of golf clubs". It was later confirmed that he had indeed retired after he made a statement at a dinner for the touring Australian players in October that he had played his last game. This finished a remarkable career where he represented the Auckland rugby side from 1923 to 1925, Hawke's Bay in 1926, and 1931–32, Wairarapa 1927–29, and Wellington in 1930. He made 44 appearances for the All Blacks including 8 tests, scoring 39 tries (4 in tests), and 123 total points. After his switch to rugby league in 1932 he played 46 matches for Richmond Rovers scoring 71 points. His league representative appearances included 11 matches for Auckland, 3 for the North Island, and 5 for New Zealand. He was regarded as one of the most outstanding players of his era.

=== Obituaries ===
James Carlaw

On May 22, 1935 James Carlaw died at his home in Mt Eden aged 81. Originally from Newcastle-on-Tyne, he was one of the founders of rugby league in Auckland where he had lived since 1863 after arriving from England on board the William Miles with the Albertland settlers. He was made the waterworks engineer for Auckland in 1900 and played a major part in the scheme to obtain a water supply from the Waitakere Ranges in the same year. He was then involved in the plan to build Waitakere Dam which was adopted by the City Council and completed in 1906. He retired in 1925 after 46 1/2 years working for the City Council.

His name would also be forever etched on the sport of rugby league in Auckland. He was heavily involved in the securing of the land which was later named after him, Carlaw Park, and in its development as the headquarters of rugby league in Auckland. Carlaw was chairman of Auckland Rugby League from 1918 to 1920 and it took 3 years of negotiating by the board he led and the Auckland Hospital Board who owned the land before Carlaw Park was eventually developed and opened on June 21, 1921. Carlaw was also a founding member of Ponsonby United in 1908. He was president of New Zealand Rugby League between 1914 and 1919, and again from 1926 to 1928. In 1928 he was elected Auckland Rugby League president and served in that role until 3 years prior to his death. He was also well involved in the pioneers of the sport of bowls in Auckland and was the champion of the Auckland Club in the 1896–97 season, and president in 1911–12. He left a wife and “an adult family of a former marriage – Mr. John Carlaw, and three daughters, Mesdames A.E. Wetherilt, J.L. Foster and R.G. Sloman” along with ten grandchildren and one great-grandchild. Chairman of Auckland Rugby League, Mr. G. Grey Campbell said of Carlaw “I think it will be generally conceded that few men have been able and willing to give to a sport more than Mr. James Carlaw gave to Auckland... his many activities in sport does not need recounting, because Carlaw Park will ever remain as a living monument to his foresight and accomplishment”. He was buried at Waikumete Cemetery at a largely attended funeral. As a mark of respect players and officials in all grades wore arm bands as a tribute to him on May 25 with the flag on the pavilion flown at half-mast.

A. (Sandy) Freeman Sandy Freeman died in September. He was involved in Auckland rugby league from its early days and was an associate of James Carlaw. He was a referee for some time and later a member of the appointments board of the Auckland Referees’ Association of which he became a life member.

== Senior A competitions ==
=== Fox Memorial standings ===
Team	Pld	W	D	L	F	A	Pts
Richmond Rovers	13	10	1	2	217	95	21
Mount Albert United	13	8	3	2	184	148	19
Devonport United	12	5	2	5	150	154	12
Newton Rangers	12	5	1	6	152	141	11
Marist Old Boys	12	4	2	6	122	156	10
Ponsonby United	12	3	1	8	157	197	7
City Rovers	12	3	0	9	114	205	6

=== Fox Memorial results ===
==== Round 1 ====
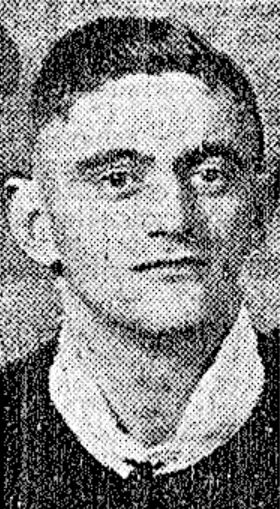
Noel Bickerton

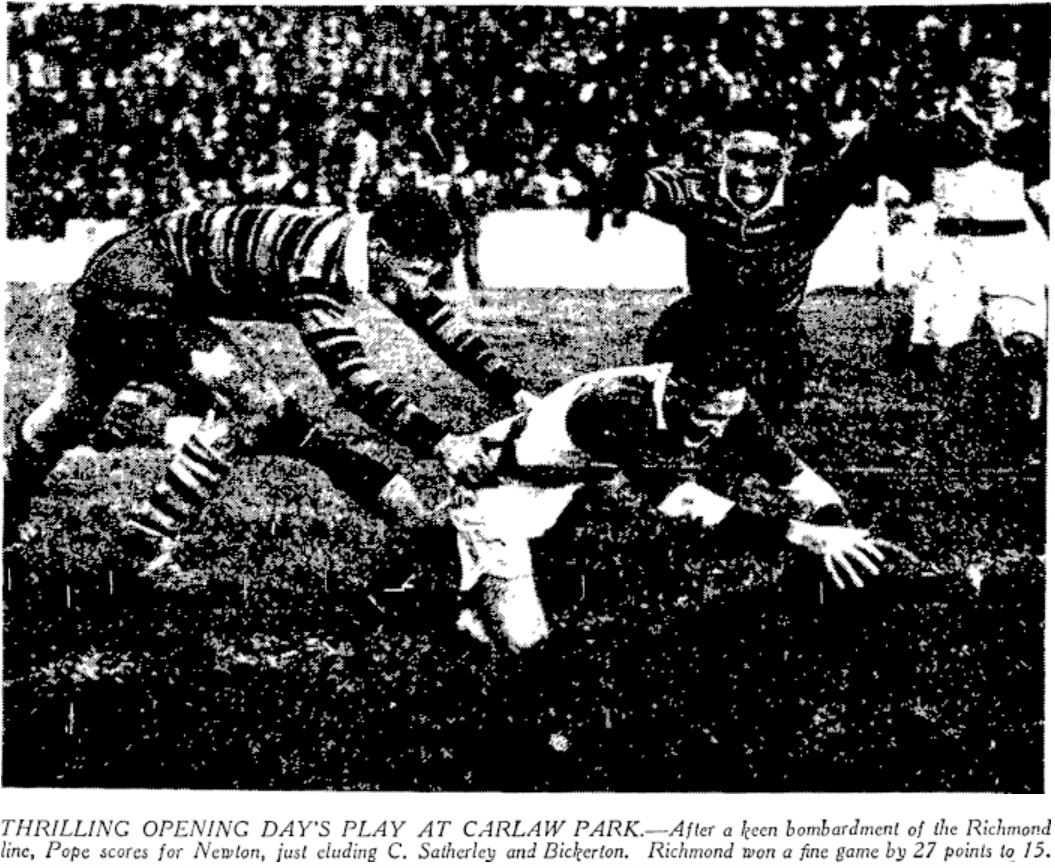

The first round saw Mount Albert play in their first ever Senior A grade match, a 13–8 win over City Rovers. They had 4 players playing in their first ever game of competitive league after switching codes. Des Herring dislocated his shoulder in the first half while playing for Mt Albert. Lou Brown had returned from England and turned out for City. Wilfred Brimble joined his brother Ted in the Newton side after joining from the Manukau 3rd grade intermediate side. He impressed on his senior debut with his older brother who was in his seventh season with Newton seniors. Noel Bickerton was on debut for the Richmond seniors and scored a try. He went on to become the 249th Kiwi after spending several years in their junior ranks. He was the great-great-grandson of Pōtatau Te Wherowhero, the first Māori king. Clarry McNeil was on debut for Mount Albert after returning from two years in Paeroa, where he was originally from, playing junior rugby. He made the New Zealand side for their 1939 tour of Australia. Devonport and Marist drew 17-17 and had now drawn three of their last four matches.

27 April	Richmond	27-15	Newton	Carlaw Park 1
3:00	Try: Ernest McNeil 3, Noel Bickerton, Bert Cooke; Con: Cliff Satherley 3 Pen: Cliff Satherley 3		Try: Heck Lunn 2, R Pope; Con: Claude Dempsey, Wilfred Brimble; Pen: Claude Dempsey	Referee: Percy Rogers

27 April	Mount Albert	13-8	City	Carlaw Park 1
1:30	Try: Des Herring 2, Clarry McNeil; Con: Robert Morrissey; Pen: Robert Morrissey		Try: Steve Watene, J Thompson; Con: Steve Watene	Referee: Maurice Wetherill

27 April	Devonport	17-17	Marist	Carlaw Park 2
3:00	Try: Grinter, Hugh Simpson, L Powell; Con: Dick Smith 2 Pen: Dick Smith 2		Try: James Chalmers, Len Barchard, Joe Woods; Con: Norm Campbell 3 Pen: Norm Campbell	Referee: Stuart Billman

==== Round 2 ====
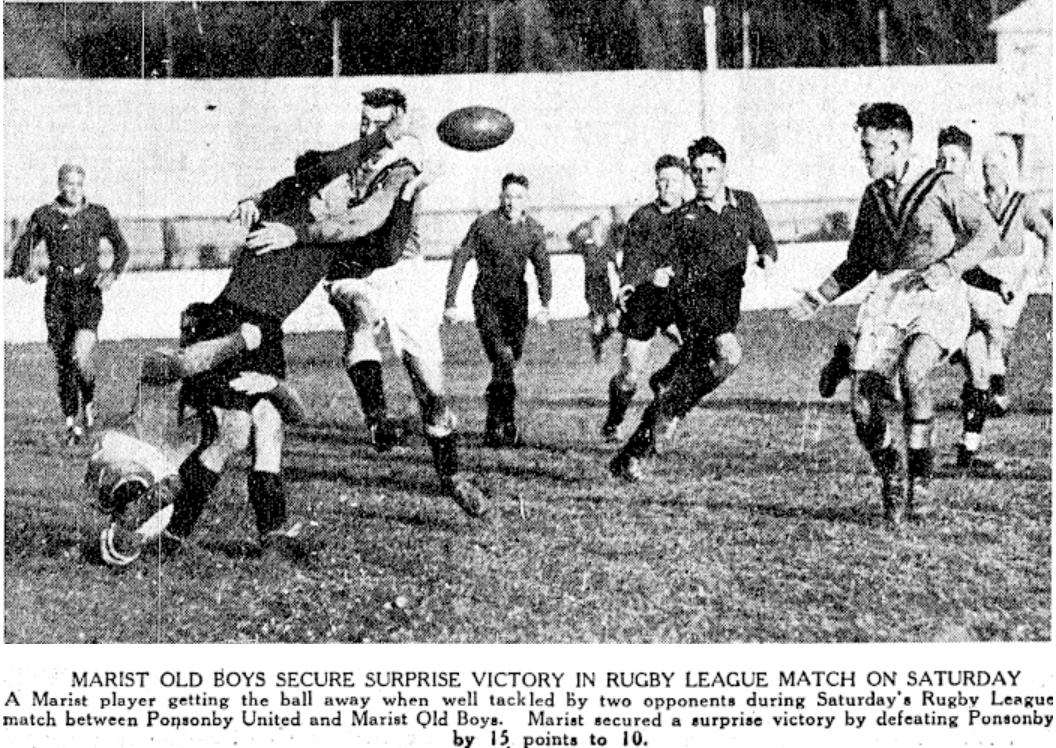

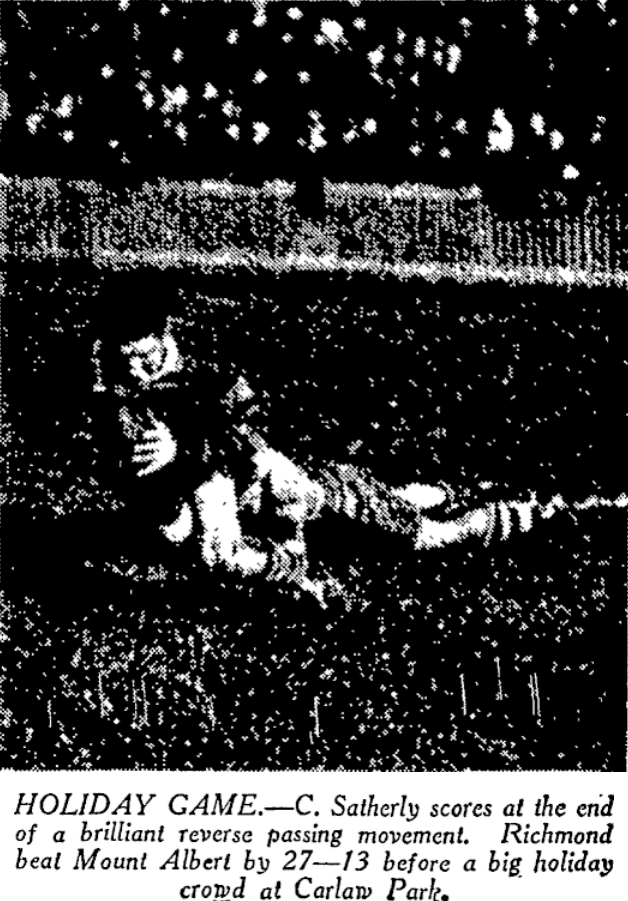
Cliff Satherley scoring for Richmond in their 27–13 win over Mount Albert.

The match between Richmond and Mt Albert was played on Kings Birthday (Monday) as part of the silver jubilee celebrations before a crowd of 10,000. Despite the efforts of Tony Milicich, the Devonport forward, who scored 2 tries and kicked a conversion and a penalty they were defeated by City who scored four tries and kicked 3 goals. Steve Watene scored one of their tries along with all their goals.

4 May	Marist	15-10	Ponsonby	Carlaw Park 1
3:00	Try: R Jones 2, Sidney Loader; Con: Norm Campbell; Pen: Norm Campbell 2		Try: Arthur Kay, Walter Stockley; Con: Roy Bright; Pen: Roy Bright	Referee: Percy Rogers

4 May	City	18-13	Devonport	Carlaw Park 1
1:45	Try: Reginald Johnson, Steve Watene, William McLaughlin, Lou Brown; Con: Steve Watene; Pen: Steve Watene 2		Try: Tony Milicich 2, Len Scott; Con: Tony Milicich; Pen: Tony Milicich	Referee: Wilfred Simpson

6 May	Richmond	27-13	Mount Albert	Carlaw Park 1
3:00	Try: Ernest McNeil, Cliff Satherley, Bert Cooke, Ted Mincham, Ray Lawless; Con: Cliff Satherley 3 Pen: Cliff Satherley 3		Try: John Schultz, Clarry McNeil, Carl Spiro; Pen: Robert Morrissey	Attendance: 10,000; Referee: Maurice Wetherill

==== Round 3 ====
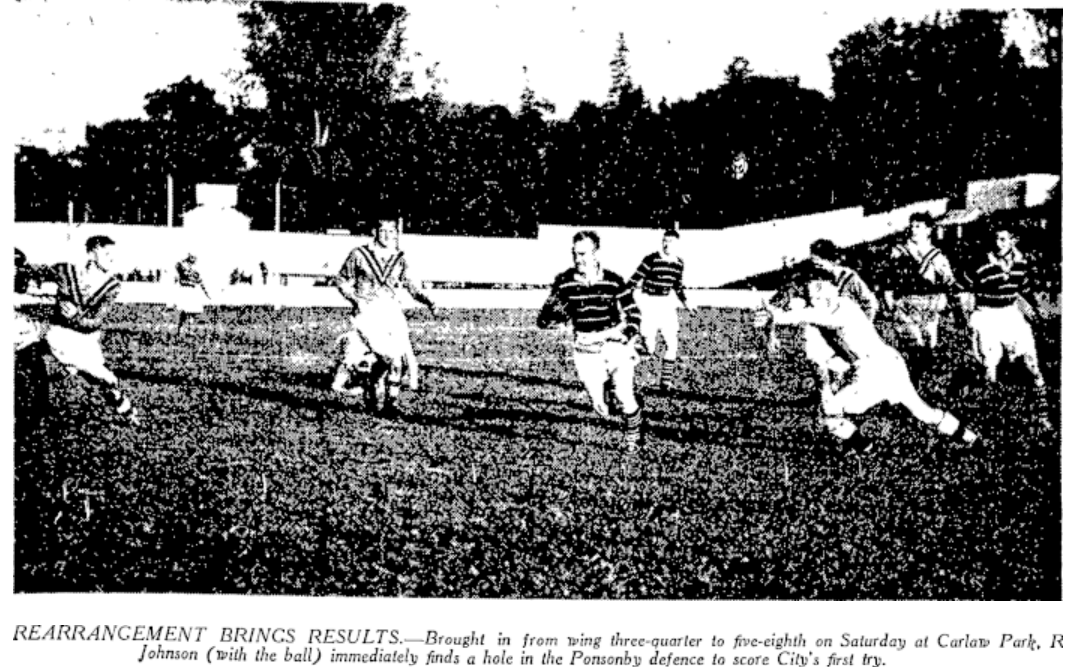
Reginald Johnson about to score for City v Ponsonby.

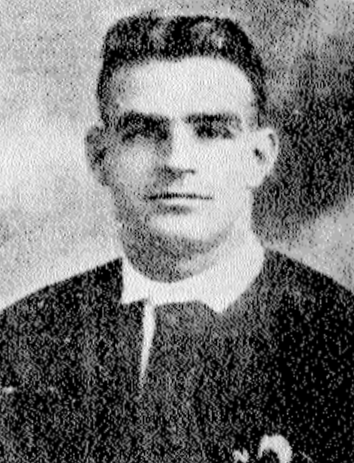
Lou Brown (City), who had recently returned to New Zealand following several seasons in England with Wigan, Halifax, and York where he had played 289 games scoring 216 tries.

For Ponsonby, backs Roy Bright, Arthur Kay, and R Jones all scored two tries while Roy Bright also added six conversions. He had started on the wing but owing to an injury to Walter Stockley at first five eighth he had to move into the inside backs with Thomas Holland, a young forward coming on to the wing and scoring two tries. Lou Brown, who had recently returned from England where he had spent three seasons with York was outstanding at centre for City. The newspapers for the second weekend in a row said that his fellow backs needed to learn to support him as he continuously made clever openings but had nobody to pass the ball to. When Ponsonby began to run away with the game in the second half many of the spectators moved across to watch the close game on the number 2 field between Newton and Mount Albert. Hugh Brady scored three tries for Newton in their 22–22 draw with Mount Albert, with Clarry McNeil scoring twice for Mount Albert. Maurice Quirke (Newton) was sent off for striking an opponent though avoided suspension due to his previous good record. It was reported that tempers had started to fray in the forwards in the second half and after he had been sent off there were "several incidents of illegal play". In the main match Richmond won 10–9 with Bert Cooke playing one of his many fine games for Richmond at fullback. He saved a try on fulltime by tackling Devonport halfback J.C. Cowan back into the field of play after he'd crossed the line. Devonport were unlucky to lose by a single point as Tony Milicich, their hooker missed two kickable penalties and they lost New Zealand representative Dick Smith to a first half injury and later lost his cousin Alf Smith leaving them a man short for the final 15 minutes.

11 May	Ponsonby	39-13	City	Carlaw Park 1
3:00	Try: Jones 2, Roy Bright 2, Arthur Kay 2, Thomas Holland 2, Brian Riley; Con: Roy Bright 6		Try: Reginald Johnson, Steve Watene, William McLaughlin; Con: Cyril Wiberg 2	Referee: Maurice Wetherill

11 May	Richmond	10-9	Devonport	Carlaw Park 1
1:45	Try: Ernest McNeil, Ronald Couper; Pen: Cliff Satherley 2		Try: J.C. Cowan, John Donald, Len Scott	Referee: Wilfred Simpson

11 May	Newton	22-22	Mount Albert	Carlaw Park 2
3:00	Try: Hugh Brady 3, Heck Lunn, R.A. Johnson, Ted Brimble; Con: Wilfred Brimble 2		Try: Clarry McNeil 2, Bert Schultz, Charles Allen; Con: Robert Morrissey 3 Pen: Robert Morrissey 2	Referee: Stuart Billman

==== Round 4 ====
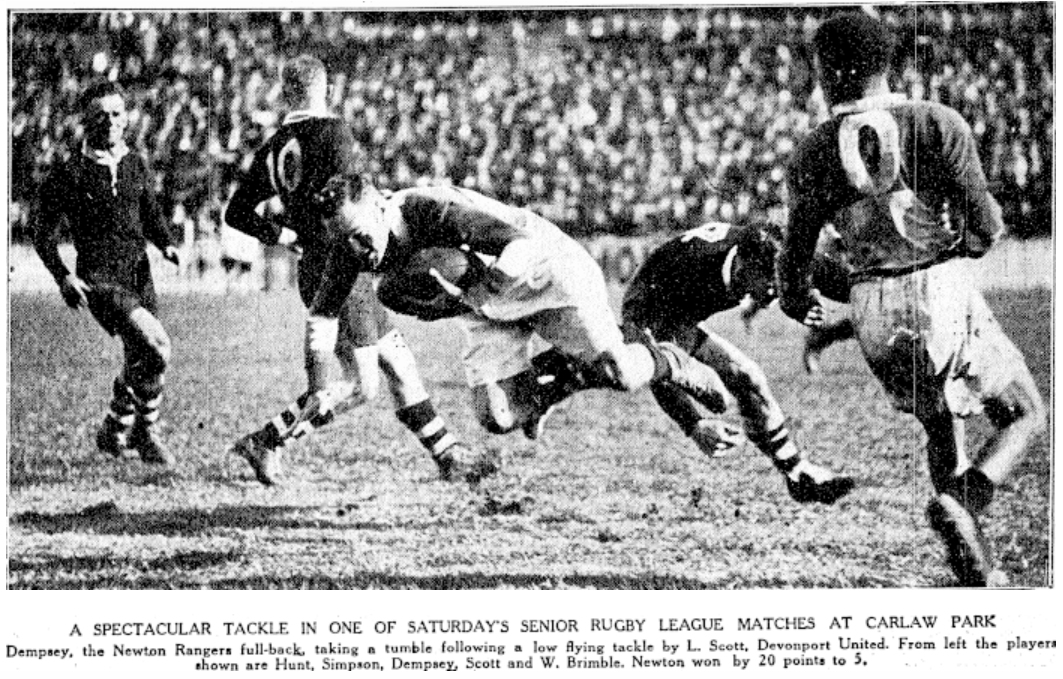

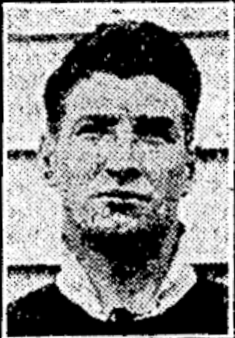
Cliff Satherley, Richmond's goal kicking loose forward.

In the match between Newton and Devonport, Reginald Kelsall (Newton) and John Donald (Devonport) were sent off in the second half and were each suspended for one match. Bert Leatherbarrow made his first appearance for Ponsonby after being transferred from Devonport. He had recently been living in the Waitoa area and had played a solitary game of rugby union there for the Eastern club. The crack Richmond side secured another solid win over a good Ponsonby side. The team featured ten past or future New Zealand internationals and fullback Bert Cooke made a "staggering side stepping, try scoring gallop from halfway". One of their non New Zealand representatives was prop Bill Telford who was an Auckland representative and would go on to coach New Zealand for many years. Cliff Satherley, the outstanding second rower kicked three conversions and two penalties.

18 May	Richmond	22-5	Ponsonby	Carlaw Park 1
3:00	Try: Bill Telford 2, Harold Tetley, Bert Cooke; Con: Cliff Satherley 3 Pen: Cliff Satherley 2		Try: John Stockley; Con: Roy Bright	Referee: Wilfred Simpson

18 May	Newton	20-5	Devonport	Carlaw Park 1
1:45	Try: Hugh Brady, Pat Young, Ted Brimble, Maurice Quirke; Con: Wilfred Brimble 3 Pen: Claude Dempsey		Try: Dick Smith; Pen: Tony Milicich	Referee: Owen Chalmers

18 May	Marist	22-11	City	Carlaw Park 2
3:00	Try: Bill Glover, Jim Laird, Dan Keane, Fraser Webberley, Arthur Furlonger, Joe Woods; Con: Dan Keane, Norm Campbell		Try: Bill Turei, Joseph Ragg, Steve Watene; Con: Steve Watene	Referee: Maurice Wetherill

==== Round 5 ====
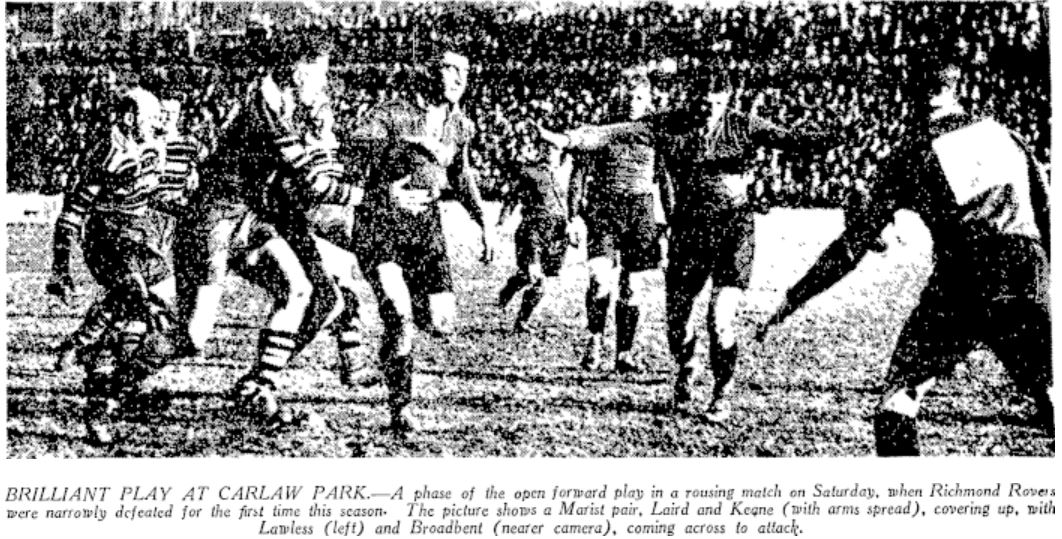
Marist v Richmond

Players in all matches wore arm bands as a mark of respect to James Carlaw, who had died that week. Newton applied for a replay after their match with Ponsonby on the grounds that the referee had altered his decision which enabled Ponsonby to win. Bert Leatherbarrow had scored a late try for Ponsonby which was converted by Roy Bright to ultimately give Ponsonby the win. The league however decided that the result stood. George Kerr the North Auckland and North Island rugby union fullback debuted for Newton at full-back with Claude Dempsey switching to inside centre with Pat Young at centre three-quarter. The match between Devonport and Mount Albert was played at the Devonport Domain and it was said that the "marine suburb has rarely seen a more exciting game.

25 May	Marist	10-8	Richmond	Carlaw Park 1
3:00	Try: Daniel Keane, Sidney Loader; Con: Norm Campbell; Pen: Norm Campbell		Try: Cliff Satherley, Ronald Couper; Pen: Cliff Satherley	Referee: Maurice Wetherill

25 May	Ponsonby	18-16	Newton	Carlaw Park 1
1:45	Try: Brian Riley, Lou Hutt, Roy Bright, Bert Leatherbarrow; Con: Roy Bright 2 Pen: Roy Bright		Try: Hugh Brady 2, Pat Young, C Franich; Con: Hugh Brady 2	Referee: Stuart Billman

25 May	Devonport	11-15	Mount Albert	Devonport Domain
3:00	Try: Ted Scott 3 Con: Tony Milicich		Try: Charles Allen, Richard Shadbolt, Bert Schultz; Con: Robert Morrissey 2 Pen: Robert Morrissey	Referee: Wilfred Simpson

==== Round 6 ====
Jim Laird, the Marist captain received a bad eye injury requiring several stitches to close the wound in their 27–5 loss to Newton. Their halfback, Jimmy Chalmers also had to leave the field with concussion. Norm Campbell was unavailable for Marist at fullback due to dental work during the week and Bill Glover filled in there. He was said to have been overshadowed by his opposite, rugby rep. George Kerr. The Brimble brothers, Ted and Wilfred shone in the Newton backline in their impressive win. One of their forwards, Reginald Kelsall was unable to play due to the death of his father earlier the same day. Des Herring returned from his round 1 shoulder injury to play at lock for Mount Albert and was said to have been cautious in their 23-13 win over Ponsonby. Howard Hogg who had transferred from Taranaki played at hooker for Ponsonby "and won a fair share of the scrums". On the number 2 field at Carlaw Park before a larger than normal crowd of spectators Lou Brown scored both of City's points in their 12–6 loss to Richmond. They led 6-2 until late in the match when Richmond crossed for tries to Ted Mincham and Cliff Satherley to take a 12–6 win. In a possible first for the era for a 'non-Māori' club side, the City team fielded five Māori players in their backs, Bill Turei, Lou Brown, Tai Nathan, Steve Watene, and Hira. Only the Māngere United club which fielded a team in the first grade in 1924 season would have included more. That side was sometimes known as "Mangere Maoris" and on occasion and was made up heavily of Māori players from that area. Prior to 1925 they were known as Mangere Rangers before later changing their name to Mangere United.

1 June	Newton	27-5	Marist	Carlaw Park 1
3:00	Try: Rudolph Franich 2, Ted Brimble, Wilfred Brimble, Pat Young; Con: Wilfred Brimble 2, Hugh Brady; Pen: Wilfred Brimble, Hugh Brady 2		Try: John Bakalich; Con: Dan Keane	Referee: Percy Rogers

1 June	Mount Albert	23-13	Ponsonby	Carlaw Park 1
1:30	Try: Charlie Renton, Clarry McNeil, Charles Dunne 2, John Schultz; Con: Robert Morrissey 3 Pen: Robert Morrissey		Try: Brian Riley, Roy Bright 2 Pen: Roy Bright, R Jones	Referee: Wilfred Simpson

1 June	Richmond	12-6	City	Carlaw Park 2
3:00	Try: Ted Mincham, Cliff Satherley; Con: Cliff Satherley 2 Pen: Cliff Satherley		Try: Lou Brown 2	Referee: Stuart Billman

==== Round 7 ====
In just his second game for Marist, 21 year old Brian Connolly had to go to hospital after being concussed in their match with Mount Albert. Marist used an unusual scrum formation with 2 players in the front row and 3 in the second row with Jim Laird, their captain playing as a rover in the backs. This was partly due to his eye injury sustained the previous week but the tactic was being used in competitions elsewhere and was experimented with in the ARL this season. The referees held a meeting on June 10 to discuss the tactic. The chairman suggested that "although there was nothing in the rules covering the point, the Auckland League be asked to insist that the orthodox scrum formation, 3-2-1, be adhered to". However others including Mr Hill and Mr Stuart Billman believed that experiments by clubs should be encouraged to improve scrums and hooking. In Devonport's 30–16 win over Ponsonby the winning side scored eight tries to eight different players.

8 June	Marist	11-11	Mount Albert	Carlaw Park 1
3:00	Try: Daniel Keane 2, Sidney Loader; Con: Daniel Keane		Try: Charles Dunne, Clarry McNeil, Phil Martin; Pen: Robert Morrissey	Referee: Maurice Wetherill

8 June	Newton	15-5	City	Carlaw Park 1
1:45	Try: Hugh Brady, Pat Young, Wilfred Brimble; Con: Hugh Brady 2, Wilfred Brimble		Try: William McLaughlin; Con: Cyril Wiberg	Referee: Percy Rogers

8 June	Devonport	30-16	Ponsonby	Carlaw Park 2
3:00	Try: C Rhodes, John Donald, Ted Scott, Adams, Allan Seagar, Tony Milicich, Len Scott, Arthur Sowter; Con: Tony Milicich 3		Try: T Moran, Roy Bright, John Stockley, Brian Riley; Con: Roy Bright, R Jones	Referee: Wilfred Simpson

==== Round 8 ====
In Devonport's 10–8 win over Marist their fullback Ernest Tier who had recently transferred from Wellington was badly concussed. The 26 year old had to leave the field. Allan Seagar moved back to fullback with L. Powell coming on as a replacement. Richmond beat Newton 14–6 with the later side struggling in the muddy conditions. Hugh Brady their goal kicking winger went off in the first half being replaced by Hulme. Newton missed him as they missed "four easy" shots at goal. George Kerr at fullback had also been injured early in the game and limped for much of it. Hulme gave away an obstruction try when he pulled down Ray Lawless as they raced for the ball. The game between Mount Albert and City was played at the Onehunga Recreation Ground with Mount Albert winning 27–14. Basil Cranch debuted for Mount Albert and kicked a conversion and played "an outstanding game" at fullback. He would go on to be their top scorer through this era in a decade in their senior side. His younger brother Ray Cranch debuted in the late 1940s before becoming a Kiwi in 1951. Claude List scored three tries for Mount Albert in the loose forwards.

15 June	Richmond	14-6	Newton	Carlaw Park 1
3:00	Try: Ted Mincham 2, Ernest McNeil, Ray Lawless (obstruction try); Con: Cliff Satherley		Pen: Wilfred Brimble 2, Hugh Brady	Referee: Wilfred Simpson

15 June	Devonport	10-8	Marist	Carlaw Park 1
1:45	Try: J Cowan, Len Scott; Con: Allan Seagar; Pen: Tony Milicich		Try: Joe Woods, Arthur Furlonger; Con: Dan Keane	Referee: Maurice Wetherill

15 June	Mount Albert	27-14	City	Onehunga Recreation Reserve
3:00	Try: Claude List 3, Robert Morrissey 2, Clarry McNeil, Bert Schultz; Con: Claude List, Robert Morrissey, Basil Cranch		Try: James Herring, J.A. Thompson; Con: Steve Watene; Pen: Steve Watene 3	Referee: Percy Rogers

==== Round 9 ====
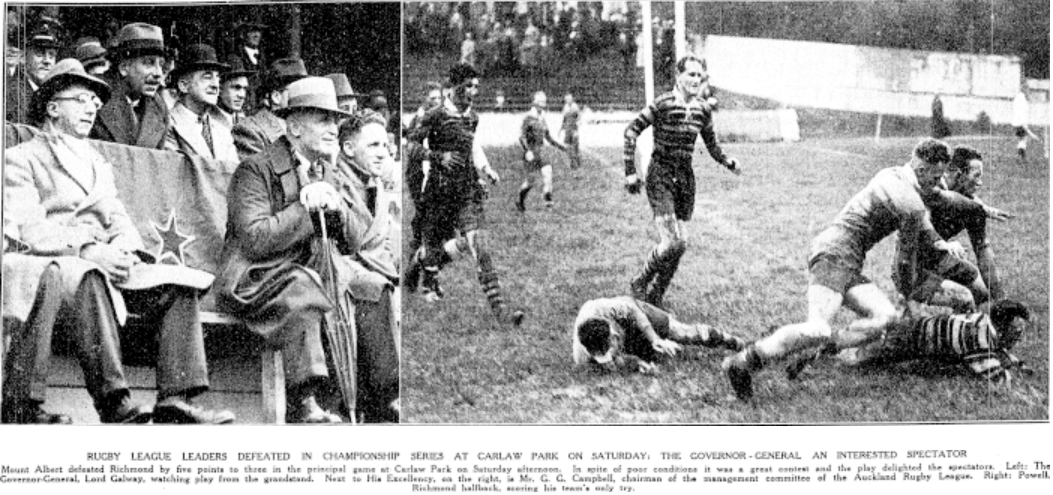

The Governor General, Lord Galway (George Monckton-Arundell) was a guest at the matches at Carlaw Park where the new grandstand had been opened. The games were played in poor conditions, "resembling a cowyard more than a football ground" in parts. On the number 2 field Devonport beat City in a game where players regularly lost their footing. Lou Brown (City) scored a characteristically good try however when he "carved the defence to shreds when finishing off a passing movement with a 30 yards dash". Steve Watene played well on the wing for City before having to go off with a hand injury while Ford, a Wairarapa rugby union representative went well on debut though was hampered by the terrible conditions. On the main field in the early game Mt Albert won 5–3 over Richmond with a try to front rower Richard Shadbolt and a penalty to Robert Morrissey. Roy Powell, Richmond's halfback was photographed scoring in the first half after taking the ball from the back of the scrum and working the blindside. In the second half Richmond lost winger Ronald Couper to injury and lock Harold Tetley had to move into the backs which gave Mount Albert an edge. Bert Cooke played an outstanding game for Richmond at fullback saving them on many occasions. The newspapers criticised the Mount Albert forwards for their late tackling of Cooke on many occasions which saw them penalised but it was said the referee should have taken stronger action. In the 3pm game Ponsonby scored two tries to one to beat Marist with fullback W. Murray scoring one and winger Thomas Holland the other.

22 June	Ponsonby	8-3	Marist	Carlaw Park 1
1:30	Try: W Murray, Thomas Holland; Con: Roy Bright		Try: S.R. Smith	Referee: Stuart Billman

22 June	Mount Albert	5-3	Richmond	Carlaw Park 1
3:00	Try: Richard Shadbolt; Pen: Robert Morrissey		Try: Roy Powell	Referee: Percy Rogers

22 June	Devonport	10-6	City	Carlaw Park 2
3:00	Try: Horace Hunt, Arthur Sowter; Con: Tony Milicich; Pen: Allan Seagar		Try: Reginald Johnson, Lou Brown	Referee: Maurice Wetherill

==== Round 10 ====
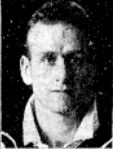
Harold Tetley (Richmond lock)

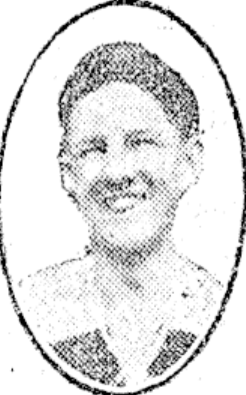
Eric Fletcher (Richmond 2nd five eighth)

Richmond beat Devonport easily in the main match at Carlaw Park. The field was in a terrible state after the curtain raiser. For the second week in a row Harold Tetley had to leave the back of the scrum and play in the backs due to an injury. This time to five eighth Noel Bickerton with a head injury, with Robertson coming on and going into the forwards. Tetley struggled with his handling but Eric Fletcher save the situation regularly and defended very well. He also scored a try and kicked 4 goals. During the match Bert Cooke at full back for Richmond broke his nose in the second half. After receiving treatment from St John's he insisted on returning to the play, “and saw out the game in good style”. The curtain raiser between Mount Albert was won by a solitary try to winger Bert Schultz which was set up by good play from Charles Dunne and Claude List inside him. Frederick Sissons made his senior Auckland debut for Newton in the five eighths and played well. He had played for Newton the previous week in their bye week match with Whangarei at the newly opened Jubilee Park in Whangarei and scored 11 points through a try and four goals. The City v Ponsonby game was moved at a late stage to the Outer Domain where the field was said to be "in much better order than Carlaw Park".

29 June	Richmond	28-0	Devonport	Carlaw Park 1
3:00	Try: Bill Telford, Cliff Satherley, Alf Mitchell, Ted Mincham, Ernest McNeil, Eric Fletcher; Con: Cliff Satherley, Eric Fletcher 3 Pen: Eric Fletcher			Referee: Maurice Wetherill

29 June	Mount Albert	3-0	Newton	Carlaw Park 1
1:45	Try: Bert Schultz			Referee: Wilfred Simpson

29 June	City	10-8	Ponsonby	Outer Domain
3:00	Try: James Dye, John Magee; Con: Bill Turei 2		Try: J Moran 2 Con: R Jones	Referee: Percy Rogers

==== Round 11 ====
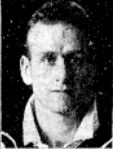
Harold Tetley (Richmond lock)

W. Payne (Ponsonby), and Ernest McNeil (Richmond) were sent off in their match and suspended for one week. Harold Tetley the Richmond lock had to go into the backs to cover for the loss of McNeil. Tetley debuted for New Zealand later in the year and went on to coach the national side on their 1955-56 tour. Ted Mincham was said to have been poor at centre and so Alf Mitchell and Tetley and previously Clarry McNeil struggled to get any ball on the wings. For Ponsonby their right winger Roy Bright scored all of their points through a try which he converted and three penalties. Norm Campbell returned to the Marist side after several weeks absence and kicked four goals in their 20–7 win.

6 July	Richmond	11-11	Ponsonby	Carlaw Park 1
3:00	Try: Ernest McNeil, Alfred Broadhead, Harold Tetley; Con: Cliff Satherley		Try: Roy Bright; Con: Roy Bright; Pen: Roy Bright 3	Referee: Percy Rogers

6 July	Marist	20-7	City	Carlaw Park 1
1:45	Try: Sidney Loader, Joe Woods, Arthur Furlonger, Dan Keane; Con: Norm Campbell 3 Pen: Norm Campbell		Try: James Herring; Con: Bill Turei; Pen: Bill Turei	Referee: Maurice Wetherill

6 July	Devonport	14-3	Newton	Carlaw Park 2
3:00	Try: Cliff Hall, John Donald, Arthur Sowter, George Radonich; Con: Tony Milicich		Try: Heck Lunn	Referee: Stuart Billman

==== Round 12 ====
Richmond were said to have been superb in their 22–0 win over Marist with second five eighth, Noel Bickerton the pick of the backs with his play reminiscent of Karl Ifwersen. Stan Prentice made his first appearance of the year for Richmond at first five eighth while Norm Campbell, the Marist full back returned to the side after several weeks absence due to a "serious illness" which was initially said to have been a dental issue which required surgery. Newton and Ponsonby met in the first ever first grade match at Glen Eden at the recreation ground there. Newton won 14 to 13.

13 July	Richmond	22-0	Marist	Carlaw Park 1
3:00	Try: Stan Prentice, Bill Telford 2, Ray Lawless, Eric Fletcher, Bert Cooke; Con: Eric Fletcher 2			Referee: Maurice Wetherill

13 July	Devonport	8-8	Mount Albert	Carlaw Park 1
1:30	Try: Allan Seagar, Horace Hunt; Con: Tony Milicich		Try: Bert Schultz, Richard Shadbolt; Pen: Robert Morrissey	Referee: Wilfred Simpson

13 July	Newton	14-13	Ponsonby	Glen Eden Recreation Ground, Glen Eden
3:00	Try: Louis Schlesinger, George Sharp, Heck Lunn, Maurice Quirke; Con: Wilfred Brimble		Try: Lou Hutt, McDonald, Arthur Kay; Con: R Jones 2	Referee: Stuart Billman

==== Round 13 ====
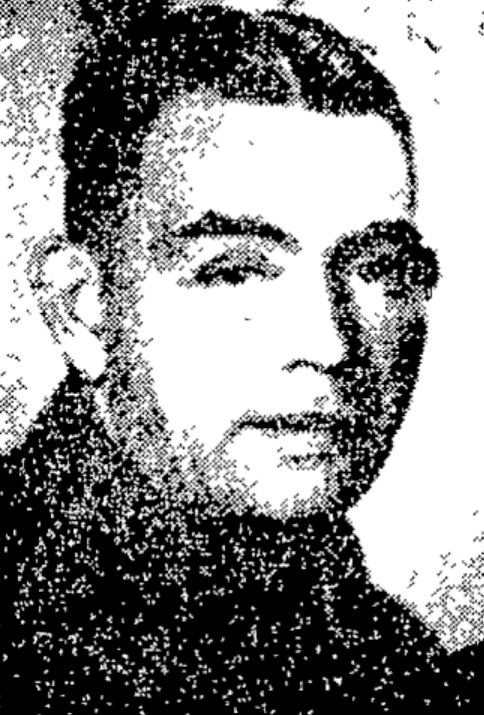
Bill Turei, played in the unfamiliar position of fullback and kicked two goals which gave City the win.

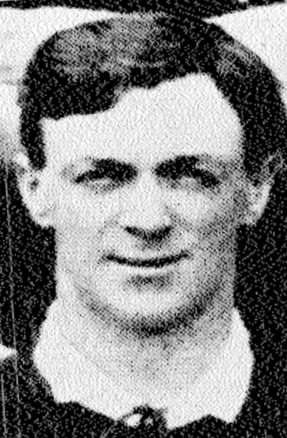
Maurice Wetherill the referee in the Marist v Mt Albert game who sent off four players for fighting.

The match between Mount Albert and Marist saw a large amount of fighting with 4 players sent off in the second half (Des Herring and Wilf Hassan for Mount Albert, and Herb Carter and Huck Flanagan for Marist). Herring and Carter were suspended for a match and Hassan and Flanagan were “severely reprimanded”. There was clearly still a lot of ill feeling between the two sides which likely stemmed back to 1934 when six Marist players fell out with the club and moved to Mount Albert midseason. The three Mount Albert players sent off had all been members of the Marist senior side who left the club. The referee was former City, Auckland, and New Zealand five eighth, Maurice Wetherill who also refereed international matches. Despite being down to 10 players against 12 the Mount Albert side still managed to extend their lead and go on to win relatively comfortably after future New Zealand prop Des Herring, one of the sent off players had earlier scored two tries. Other internationals, Wilf Hassan, and Claude List added their other tries. For City, their usual winger, 28 year old Bill Turei played at fullback and played a good game there, and kicked two outstanding goals which helped them to their win. Turei had been a very good tennis player in the early 1930s competing at a high level but was later tragically killed in World War 3 in 1943 aged 36. Reginald Johnson who had scored both of City's tries left the field with an injury in the first half and was replaced by veteran William McLaughlin who went into the forwards with James Dye moving from the scrum on to the wing.

20 July	Mount Albert	18-6	Marist	Carlaw Park 1
3:00	Try: Wilf Hassan, Des Herring 2, Claude List; Con: Robert Morrissey 3		Try: Arthur Furlonger, James Chalmers	Referee: Maurice Wetherill

20 July	Devonport	23-5	Ponsonby	Carlaw Park 1
1:30	Try: Cliff Hall, Rogers, J.C. Cowan, Len Scott, George Radonich; Con: Tony Milicich 2, Allan Seagar; Pen: Allan Seagar		Try: Thomas Holland; Con: R Jones	Referee: Percy Rogers

20 July	City	10-7	Newton	Carlaw Park 2
3:00	Try: Reginald Johnson 2 Con: Bill Turei; Pen: Bill Turei		Try: Ted Brimble; Con: Wilfred Brimble; Pen: Wilfred Brimble	Referee: Roy Otto

==== Round 14 ====
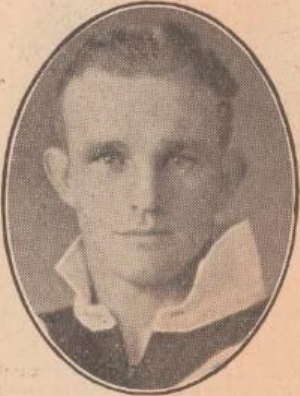
Clarry McNeil (Mount Albert)

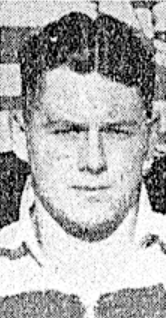
Arthur Kay (Ponsonby)

Mount Albert's 17–11 defeat of Ponsonby meant that they had won the first senior trophy of the season, the Thistle Cup. This trophy was awarded to the team that had accrued the most competition points in the second round. Their wingers Bert Schultz and Clarry McNeil scored tries for Mount Albert with Robert Morrissey kicking four goals. Arthur Kay scored two tries for Ponsonby and in September debuted for the Kiwi's and played all three tests against Australia. City started well against Richmond with Lou Brown setting up a try for J.A. Thompson but then Richmond took control scoring 19 points before half time. In the second half the only points were a try to Brown for City. The Newton - Marist game was played in a "quagmire" on the number 2 field at Carlaw Park. Neither team was said to have played well in the conditions which saw only two tries. Marist went close to scoring three times in the last few minutes which would have given them the win but failed each time. William Carroll, a rugby player from Hamilton debuted for Marist and "impressed".

27 July	Richmond	19-6	City	Carlaw Park 1
3:00	Try: Harold Tetley 2, Eric Fletcher, Cliff Satherley, Alf Mitchell; Con: Cliff Satherley 2		Try: J.A. Thompson, Lou Brown	Referee: Wilfred Simpson

27 July	Mount Albert	17-11	Ponsonby	Carlaw Park 1
1:30	Try: Richard Shadbolt, Clarry McNeil, Bert Schultz; Con: Robert Morrissey 3 Pen: Robert Morrissey		Try: Arthur Kay 2, R Jones; Pen: John Stockley	Referee: Percy Rogers

27 July	Newton	7-5	Marist	Carlaw Park 2
3:00	Try: Reginald Kelsall; Pen: George Kerr; Drop: George Kerr		Try: Bailey; Pen: Dan Keane	Referee: Owen Chalmers

==== Final ====
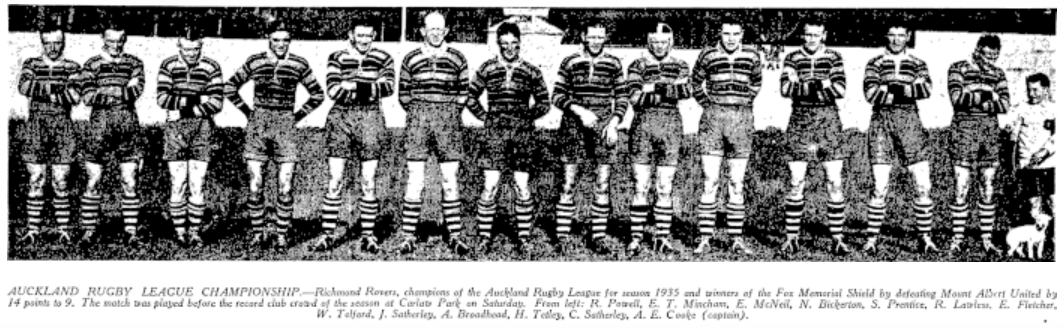
The champion Richmond Rovers side.

Richmond beat Mount Albert to claim their second straight first grade championship. Their side was one of the more extraordinary club rugby league sides in New Zealand history with a remarkable number of representative players. The final side featured Bert Cooke, Ernie McNeil, Ted Mincham, Eric Fletcher, Noel Bickerton, Stan Prentice, Roy Powell, Bill Telford, Jack Satherley, Alf Broadhead, Cliff Satherley, Ray Lawless, and Harold Tetley. All of them played for New Zealand with the exception of Ernie McNeil, Alf Broadhead and Bill Telford, though Telford coached New Zealand in the 1950s and McNeil and Broadhead both represented Auckland in 1938. The side was so strong that even New Zealand representative Alf Mitchell (selected at the end of the year for a test with Australia) was a reserve for the game. Lawless and Powell scored for Richmond with Cliff Satherley kicking four goals. The points for Mount Albert came from a Bert Schultz try and three penalties to five eighth, Robert Morrissey.

10 August	Richmond	14-9	Mount Albert	Carlaw Park 1
3:00	Try: Ray Lawless, Roy Powell; Con: Cliff Satherley; Pen: Cliff Satherley 3		Try: Schultz; Pen: Robert Morrissey 3	Referee: Percy Rogers

=== Friendly Matches ===
Prior to the commencement of the Roope Rooster a unique weekend of matches took place. Ponsonby and Otahuhu took on each other on the #1 field at Carlaw Park, however at 1:30 Devonport played Marist and City played Newton. At halftime in the respective matches the leading teams continued play on the #1 field while the trailing teams played against each other on the #2 field.

==== Ponsonby v Otahuhu ====
Scoring was barely reported for any of the matches but it was noted that Roy Bright scored several tries for Ponsonby.

10 August	Ponsonby	34-17	Otahuhu	Carlaw Park 2
3:00	Try: Roy Bright 3 and 25 unknown points		Try: Matson 2, unknown 11 points

==== First Half Matches ====
10 August	Devonport	8-6	Marist	Carlaw Park 1
1:30

10 August	City	16-3	Newton	Carlaw Park 2
1:30

==== Second Half Matches ====
10 August	Devonport	13-8	City	Carlaw Park 1
	Try: L Powell, Unknown x 2 Con: Unknown x 2		Try: Unknown x 2 Con: Unknown x 1

10 August	Newton	17-8	Marist	Carlaw Park 2
	Try: Unknown 17 points		Try: Unknown 8 points

=== Roope Rooster ===
==== Round 1 ====
Ted Brimble scored three tries for Newton in a 27–8 win over Otahuhu. It was the first time the teams had met at a senior level since 1917. Otahuhu, who won the Sharman Cup (Senior B) competition were admitted to the Roope Rooster competition to make an even eight teams. The match between Mount Albert and Marist was once again marred by rough play and Richard Shadbolt was sent off after a fight broke out at a scrum. He was suspended for the remainder of the season. Lou Brown scored four tries for City in their 28–16 win over Ponsonby. Roy Bright, the Ponsonby back injured his chest in the second half and was forced from the field. It later proved to be a broken rib. With no replacements allowed Lou Hutt was forced out of the pack to play on the wing.

24 August	Richmond	23-15	Devonport	Carlaw Park 1
3:00	Try: Roy Powell, Noel Bickerton, Bill Telford, Eric Fletcher, Ted Mincham; Con: Cliff Satherley 4		Try: J.C. Cowan, L Powell, Arthur Sowter; Con: Tony Milicich; Pen: Tony Milicich 2	Referee: Wilfred Simpson

24 August	Mount Albert	18-15	Marist	Carlaw Park 1
1:30	Try: Clarry McNeil, Carl Spiro, Robert Morrissey, Des Herring; Con: Robert Morrissey 2 Pen: Robert Morrissey		Try: Jim Laird 2, Joe Woods; Con: William Carroll 2 Pen: William Carroll	Referee: Percy Rogers

24 August	City	28-16	Ponsonby	Carlaw Park 1
3:00	Try: Lou Brown 4, Cyril Wiberg, Leo Cooney, Reginald Johnson, Steve Watene; Con: Steve Watene, Bill Turei		Try: Arthur Kay, Lou Hutt, Frank Halloran, Bert Leatherbarrow; Con: Bert Leatherbarrow; Pen: Roy Bright	Referee: Stuart Billman

24 August	Newton	27-8	Otahuhu	Carlaw Park 2
1:30	Try: Ted Brimble 3, Hugh Brady 2, Roy Johnstone, Pat Young; Con: Wilfred Brimble; Pen: Wilfred Brimble 2		Try: Halsey, Lloyd; Con: Philip	Referee: Roy Otto

==== Semifinals ====
All teams at Carlaw Park wore arm bands as a mark of respect to Thomas McClymont on the death of his father. McClymont had played for New Zealand and was the current Richmond and Auckland coach, before later going on to coach New Zealand from 1936 to 1952 after having previously coached them in 1928.

31 August	Richmond	20-6	Mount Albert	Carlaw Park 1
3:00	Try: Alfred Broadhead, Bill Telford, Roy Powell, Eric Fletcher, Jack Satherley, Ted Mincham; Con: Cliff Satherley		Pen: Robert Morrissey 3	Referee: Maurice Wetherill

31 August	Newton	17-11	City	Carlaw Park 1
1:30	Try: Hugh Brady 3 Con: Hugh Brady; Pen: Hugh Brady 2, Wilfred Brimble		Try: Steve Watene, Joseph Hapi, James Dye; Con: Steve Watene	Referee: Wilfred Simpson

==== Final ====
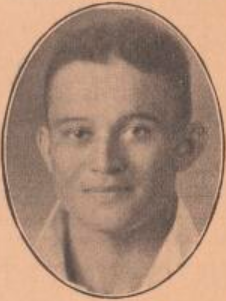
Wilfred Brimble (Newton's halfback)

Auckland were on tour and as a result Richmond were missing Bert Cooke, Eric Fletcher, Cliff Satherley, and Harold Tetley, while Claude Dempsey and Ted Brimble were absent for Newton. Despite Richmond's losses they still fielded a team with seven current or future New Zealand representatives and others who had played for Auckland previously. Richmond struggled in the first half with Bert Cooke's loss from the fullback position felt where the inexperienced M Marshall was playing. Despite this they finished strongly and managed to score a try on full time to winger Ernie McNeil to draw within 2 points. Jack Satherley took the kick from a difficult position and missed to hand Newton their third ever Roope Rooster title following 1919 and 1920. For Newton, Rudolph Franich struggled in the unfamiliar position of first five eighth, though Pat Young played well outside him and Louis Schlesinger at centre was very good until he had to leave the field with a first half injury. Hugh Brady, one of the leading point scorers in the competition for the season was excellent on the wing and scored a try. Wilfred Brimble, the Newton halfback "over shadowed" Roy Powell. Brimble was Hawaiian born to an English father and Bantu (South Africa) mother. He went on to represent New Zealand in 1938 along with his brother Walter Brimble. Their older brother Ted Brimble had represented New Zealand in 1932, while other brothers Cyril and John were both domestic representatives in rugby league and rugby union respectively. Wilfred would also coach the Wellington representative side in 1950.

7 September	Newton	10-8	Richmond	Carlaw Park 1
3:00	Try: Hugh Brady, Wilfred Brimble; Con: George Kerr; Pen: Wilfred Brimble		Try: Maurice Metcalfe, Ernie McNeil; Con: M Marshall	Referee: Wilfred Simpson

=== Phelan Shield ===
==== Preliminary semi-finals ====
31 August	Devonport	34-22	Marist	Carlaw Park 2
3:00	Try: Cliff Hall 2, Horace Hunt 2, Herbert Thompson, C Rhodes, Len Scott, Tony Milicich; Con: Tony Milicich 3, Arthur Sowter, C Rhodes		Try: John Bakalich 2, Sidney Loader, Dan Keane, Jim Laird, Jimmy Chalmers; Con: Jimmy Chalmers 2	Referee: Stuart Billman

31 August	Ponsonby	27-3	Otahuhu	Carlaw Park 2
1:30	Try: Arthur Kay 2, Bert Leatherbarrow 2, Walter Stockley, R Jones, Lou Hutt; Con: Walter Stockley, R Jones; Pen: Walter Stockley		Try: Greenwood	Referee: Owen Chalmers

==== Semifinals ====
With the Auckland representative side on tour most sides were missing a few of their regular players. Mount Albert fielded three players who had come across from rugby. They were Bruce Constable from Manukau, Ken Carter from Ponsonby, and Spratt from Eden. The later scored one of their three tries. Carter had played three games for Auckland rugby in 1932 (2) and 1933 (1). Constable had played for Auckland B rugby team against Thames Valley during the year and had been named to play in the same side for this same weekend but chose to try his hand at rugby league instead and started the 1936 season with the same side.

7 September	Mount Albert	15-11	Devonport	Carlaw Park 1
1:30	Try: Huck Flanagan, Phil Martin, Spratt; Con: Robert Morrissey; Pen: Robert Morrissey 2		Try: Tony Milicich, George Radonich, Horace Hunt; Con: Tony Milicich	Referee: Ralph Otto

7 September	Ponsonby	20-10	City	Carlaw Park 2
1:45	Try: Frank Halloran, Frederick Deason, Thomas Holland, Walter Stockley; Con: Walter Stockley 3, Frederick Deason		Try: Cyril Wiberg, James Dye; Con: Maher; Pen: Maher	Referee: Percy Rogers

==== Final ====
For Ponsonby, recent transfer from the Ponsonby Rugby Club, Bella Johnson scored 2 tries. He had been a prop and later returned to the Ponsonby rugby side. Ken Carter had also come across to league from the same side and scored 2 tries for Mount Albert.

14 September	Ponsonby	11-8	Mount Albert	Carlaw Park 1
1:30	Try: Bella Johnson 2, Frank Halloran; Con: R Jones		Try: Ken Carter 2 Con: Robert Morrissey	Referee: Percy Rogers

=== Stormont Shield ===
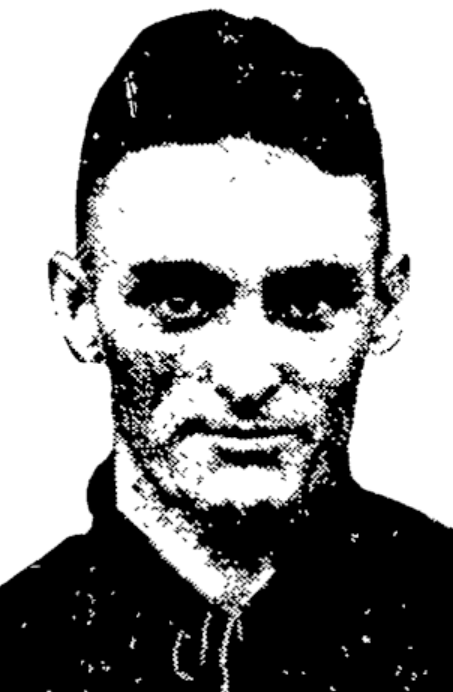
Ted Mincham (Richmond)

Australian actress Nellie Bramley kicked off the main game and then was carried off the field by Maurice Quirke and Stan Prentice, the respective captains. Flags were flown at half-mast due to the death of Mr. A (Sandy) Freeman, an old Auckland official and life member of the Auckland Referees Association. With the 26–15 win Richmond won the Stormont Shield for the second straight season and the second time in their history. Alf Mitchell scored four tries for Richmond and was "the star of the match". For Richmond Ted Mincham scored a try and kicked four goals while for Newton Hugh Brady nearly matched the feat with a try and three goals. With Noel Bickerton unavailable through injury the Richmond side played Jack Satherley at second five eighth. He had been a back earlier in his career, mostly at centre and fullback but in recent times played in the forwards and in 1936 onwards he settled at hooker and represented New Zealand there in 1937 and 1938. Wilfred Brimble, the star Newton halfback was injured early in the second half and was unable to be replaced and was described as a virtual "passenger" for the rest of the game. Aiden Hickey, a Newton player from 1933 to 1934 had returned from playing rugby in the King Country and played poorly at centre before being replaced there by Hugh Brady who moved in off the wing. Leo Davis scored a try on debut for Richmond. He was the first of the original schoolboys sides from the late 1920s who had passed entirely through the grades to debut for the top team.

==== Final ====
14 September	Richmond	26-15	Newton	Carlaw Park 1
3:00	Try: Alf Mitchell 4, Leo Davis, Ted Mincham; Con: Ted Mincham 3 Pen: Ted Mincham		Try: Ray Middleton, Hugh Brady, Heck Lunn; Con: Hugh Brady; Pen: Hugh Brady 2	Referee: Maurice Wetherill

=== Top try scorers and point scorers ===
The point scoring lists are compiled from matches played in the Fox Memorial, Roope Rooster, Phelan Shield, and Stormont Shield. Competitions which involved all first grade sides. The top point scorer was Cliff Satherley, the Richmond second rower with 89 points. Close behind him was Mount Albert fullback Robert Morrissey with 87. Hugh Brady (Newton) scored the most tries with 14, tied for second were Lou Brown in his 14th season of senior rugby league, Arthur Kay in his third, Ernest McNeil in his second, and Clarry McNeil in his first. Kay had debuted for New Zealand during the year while Lou Brown had first played for New Zealand in 1925. Clarry McNeil would debut for New Zealand on their 1938 tour of Australia.

Top try scorers
Rk	Player	Team	Games	Tries
1	Hugh Brady	Newton	13	14
2=	Arthur Kay	Ponsonby	14	9
2=	Lou Brown	City	15	9
2=	Clarry McNeil	Mount Albert	17	9
2=	Ernest McNeil	Richmond	14	9
6=	Ted Mincham	Richmond	17	8
6=	Roy Bright	Ponsonby	14	8
8=	Ted Brimble	Newton	14	7
8=	Bill Telford	Richmond	17	7
8=	Bert Schultz	Mount Albert	16	7

Top point scorers
Rk	Player	Team	G	T	C	P	DG	Pts
1	Cliff Satherley	Richmond	15	5	22	15	0	89
2	Robert Morrissey	Mount Albert	17	3	20	19	0	87
3	Hugh Brady	Newton	13	14	7	7	0	70
4	Roy Bright	Ponsonby	14	8	13	6	0	62
5=	Tony Milicich	Devonport	15	5	14	3	0	49
5=	Wilfred Brimble	Newton	17	3	12	8	0	49
7	Steve Watene	City	12	6	5	5	0	38
8	Ted Mincham	Richmond	17	8	3	1	0	32
9=	Norm Campbell	Marist	10	0	9	5	0	28
9=	Daniel Keane	Marist	15	6	4	1	0	28
9=	R Jones	Ponsonby	-	4	7	1	0	28

=== Other senior club matches ===
==== Newton v Huntly ====
6 May	Newton	13-9	Huntly	Carlaw Park 1
1:45	Try: Heck Lunn 2, Rudolph Franich; Con: Wilfred Brimble 2		Try: Braun; Con: Stone; Pen: Stone 2	Referee: S Fisher

==== Huntly v Richmond ====
On June 8 Richmond had the bye in the Fox Memorial competition so they travelled to Huntly to take on the local senior side. They ran out winners by 19 points to 0. In the evening a dance was held in their honour at the Parish Hall, Huntly with music supplied by Peden's Orchestra. Mr W.C. Davies spoke as the local club patron with Mr Redwood, the Richmond manager replying along with Bert Cooke. Harold Tetley won a prize for dancing.

	Date		Score		Score	Venue
Richmond Tour Match	8 June	Huntly	0	Richmond	19	Huntly

==== Newton v Whangarei ====
Newton travelled to Whangarei to mark the opening of Jubilee Park. A large paying crowd of 700 was in attendance with Mayor Mr. W. Jones expressing pleasure at the league taking over “such a splendid piece of ground”. Also present as guests were Horrie Miller, the secretary of New South Wales Rugby Football League, and Cyril Snedden the president of New Zealand Rugby League. Accompanying the Newton team was their coach Dougie McGregor and former Newton and Kiwi player, Bill Cloke who was the club secretary, J Rutledge (manager), and P. Henry (treasurer). Newton won the match 20–14 after taking a 10–3 halftime lead. During the first half they lost fullback George Kerr after he saved a try in a race for the line with W. Meyer and was injured. He was replaced by Hugh Brady who went on to the wing with Claude Dempsey moving back to his old position of fullback.

22 June	Whangarei	14-20	Newton	Jubilee Park, Whangarei
	Try: D Parkes, W Meyer, R Merrick, T Toki; Con: D Parkes		Try: Claude Dempsey, Frederick Sissons, Alex Nathan, Maurice Quirke; Con: Frederick Sissons 3 Pen: Frederick Sissons	Attendance: 700; Referee: F Little

==== Taupiri v Mount Albert ====
Mount Albert travelled to Taupiri to play their senior side. Both teams were missing many of their best players and Taupiri ran out 11–6 winners. William Tittleton scored for Taupiri. His brothers George and Walter played for Taupiri but did not appear in this match. Both played for New Zealand and transferred to join the Richmond club in 1936. Basil Cranch scored for Mt Albert. His younger brother Ray Cranch, debuted for Mt Albert in the mid-1940s and went on to play for New Zealand and has had the Senior B competition trophy named after him. Clarry McNeil in his debut senior season scored Mt Albert's other try.

6 July	Taupiri	11-6	Mount Albert	Onslow Park, Taupiri
	Try: E Taylor, William Tittleton, Pawson; Con: Jackways		Try: Basil Cranch, Clarry McNeil

==== Whangarei v City ====
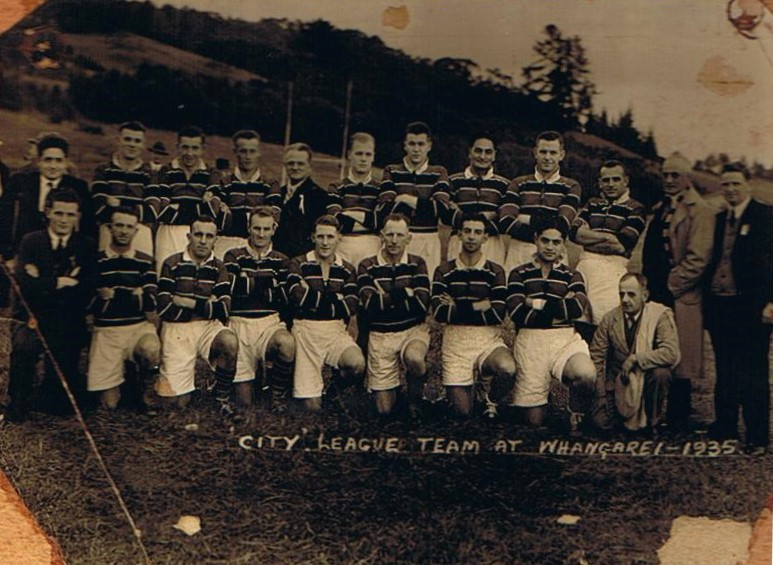
City Rovers at Jubilee Park, Whangārei.

On July 13 the City Rovers traveled to Whangārei to play the Whangārei side. The team was photographed at Jubilee Park. Manager, Ernie Asher is standing, 2nd from the right, with Lou Brown to his left, and Puti Tipene Watene 3rd player from the right in back row. Joseph Hapi is in the front row on the right with Eugene Donovan the 2nd player from the right in the front row. Other players in the side were O Hughes, James Dye, Reginald Johnson, Cyril Wiberg, S Belsham, Stan Clark, Joseph Ragg, Magee, and W Johnson.

13 July	Whangarei	13-11	City	Jubilee Park, Whangarei
	Try: T Toki 2, C Meyer; Con: D Parkes, Charlie Wells		Try: Steve Watene, Joseph Ragg, Lou Brown; Con: Steve Watene	Attendance: 500; Referee: F Little

==== Wellington v Richmond ====
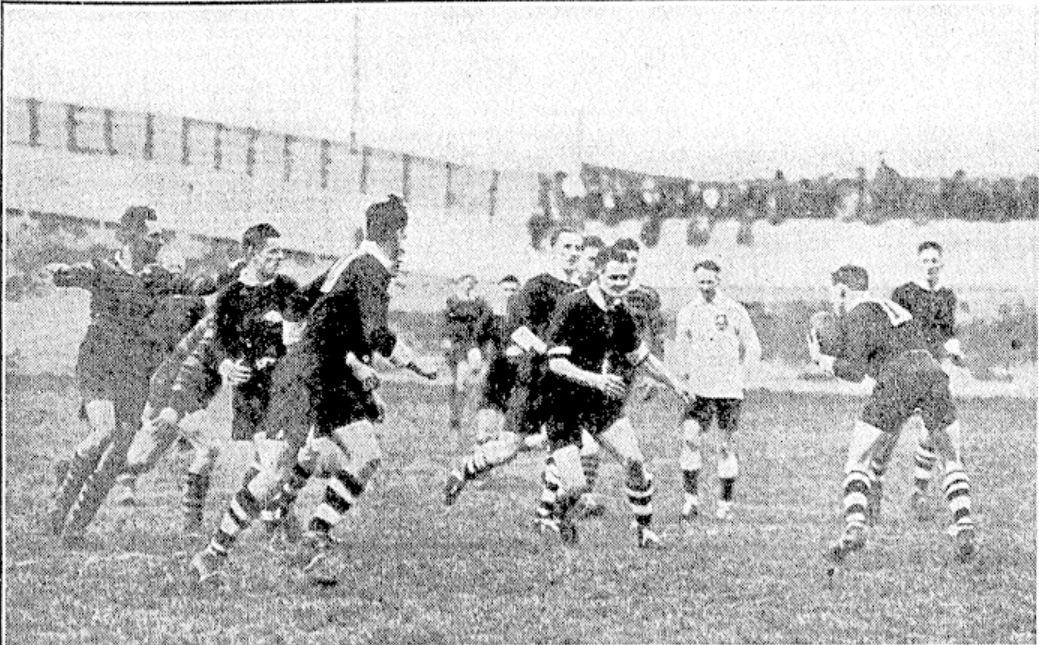
Play in the game between Richmond and Wellington, with a Richmond player receiving the ball.

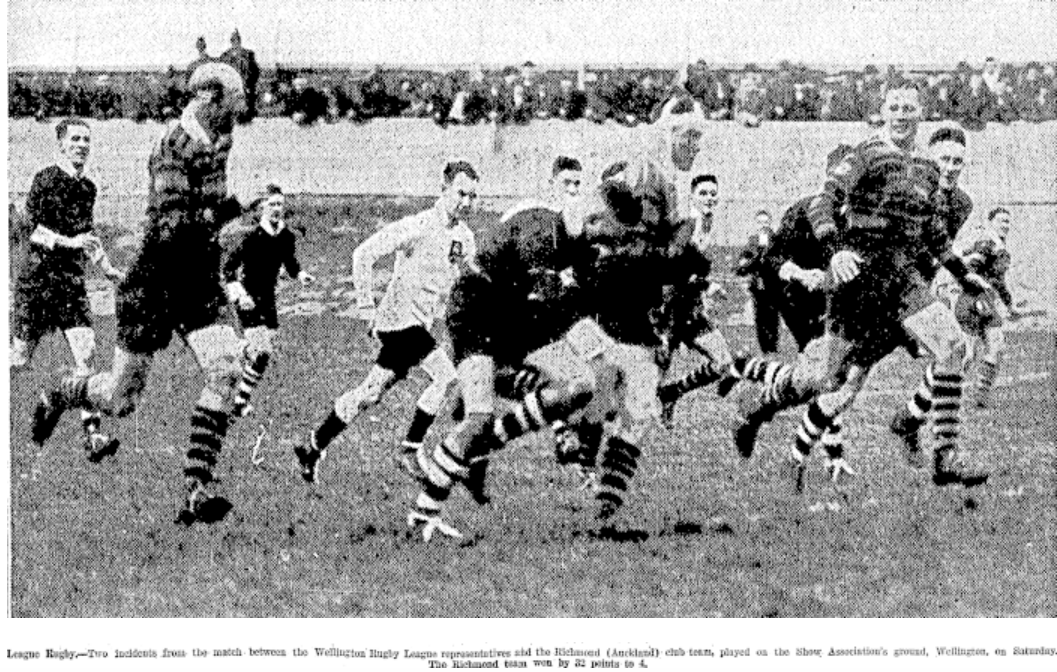

While on a bye the Richmond side traveled to Wellington to play the local representative side. Richmond perhaps unsurprisingly won comfortably 32–4 with Bert Cooke, Bill Telford, and Alf Mitchell all scoring doubles. While Cliff Satherley kicking four conversions. In a tragic link to Wellington, Satherley would be found dead on Lyall Bay Beach in January, 1947 after disappearing from Wellington Public Hospital.

20 July	Wellington	4-32	Richmond	Winter Show Stadium
Wellington	Pen: W Scorringe 2		Try: Bill Telford 2, Bert Cooke 2, Alf Mitchell 2, Alfred Broadhead, Ernest McNeil; Con: Cliff Satherley 4	Attendance: 3,000; Referee: Wilfred Simpson

==== Whangarei v Devonport ====
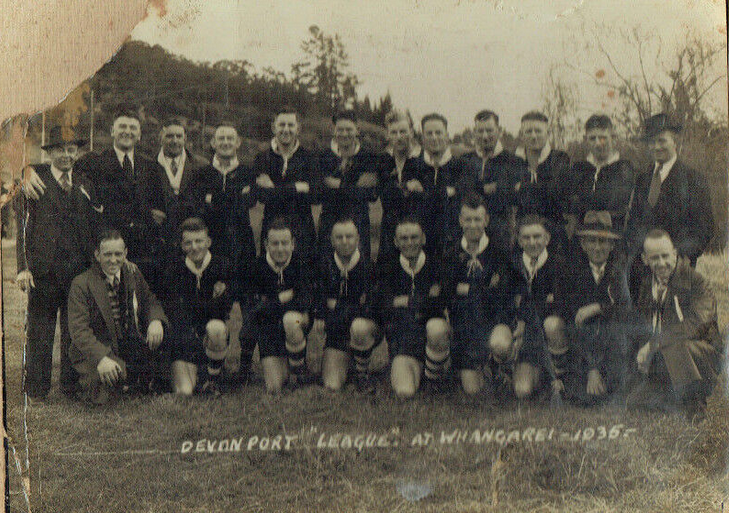
Devonport side to play Whangarei

14 September	Whangarei	22-16 (13-10)	Devonport	Jubilee Park, Whangarei
	Try: T Jones 2, H Bowyer 2, H Baker, D Parkes; Con: D Parkes 2		Try: Carroll 2, C Rhodes, Len Scott; Con: Allan Seagar 2	Referee: F Little

==== Taradale v Mount Albert ====
Mount Albert travelled to the Hawke's Bay to play Taradale in Napier who had won the competition there. Following the game they were presented with the Vigor Brown Trophy for winning the championship. Mount Albert won the match 22–13 after a "fine exhibition for the 1.X.L. Cup". Joseph Gunning, a Mount Albert forward had to stay in Napier after breaking his collarbone. For Mount Albert Spratt, a five eighth scored twice as did Bert Schultz. Forward Richard Shadbolt also scored a try as did Claude List who had represented New Zealand 4 times from 1928 to 1932 at centre and wing but was now regularly playing in the forwards.

21 September	Taradale	13-22	Mount Albert	Taradale Park, Napier
	Try: Hepburn, Adams, Wilson; Con: R.E. Smith 2		Try: Richard Shadbolt, Spratt 2, Bert Schultz 2, Claude List; Con: Basil Cranch, Phil Martin

== Senior reserve competitions ==
=== Norton Cup (senior reserve championship) ===
In Round 8 Devonport was unable to fulfil their fixture with Marist and asked for the opportunity to play it at a later date which was declined due to their being no time to do so. In Round 9 City protested their 5–5 draw with Devonport on the grounds that the referee called the game off at 3pm which meant that the second half was played short. The matter was referred to the Referee's Association for report. At the conclusion of the round robin the top 4 teams played off for the title. In the match between City and Richmond the crowd encroached on the field 3 times halting play. City's win meant that Marist would have to playoff for the title with Richmond. Marist won the title with a 3–0 win in the final.

=== Standings ===
A number of match results were not published in any of the newspapers so complete win loss records and points for and against are not available. E Johnson coached the Devonport team.

Team	Pld	W	D	L	F	A	Pts
Marist Old Boys reserves	13	9	0	4	87	48	18
Richmond Rovers reserves	13	9	0	4	133	22	18
City Rovers reserves	12	8	1	3	115	53	17
Devonport United reserves	12	5	1	6	86	83	11
Mount Albert United reserves	12	3	0	7	52	103	6
Ponsonby United reserves	12	3	0	7	62	155	6
Newton Rangers reserves	12	2	0	9	53	127	4

=== Results ===
	Date		Score		Score	Venue
Round 1	27 April	City	12	Mount Albert	6	Auckland Domain, 3:00
-	27 April	Devonport	5	Marist	3	Carlaw Park 2, 1:30
-	27 April	Richmond	7	Newton	3	Auckland Domain, 1:30
Round 2	4 May	Richmond	33	Mount Albert	0	Auckland Domain, 1:30
-	4 May	City	14	Devonport	0	Carlaw Park 2, 1:30
-	4 May	Marist	17	Ponsonby	7	Carlaw Park 2, 1:45
Round 3	11 May	Newton	10	Mount Albert	8	Carlaw Park 2, 1:45
-	11 May	City	23	Ponsonby	2	Auckland Domain, 1:45
-	11 May	Richmond	18	Devonport	2	Auckland Domain, 3:00
Round 4	18 May	City	7	Marist	6	Carlaw Park 2, 1:45
-	18 May	Richmond	21	Ponsonby	9	Auckland Domain, 1:45
-	18 May	Devonport	16	Newton	2	Auckland Domain, 3:00
Round 5	25 May	Ponsonby	14	Newton	10	Carlaw Park 2, 3:00
-	25 May	Richmond	?	Marist	?	Carlaw Park 2, 1:30
-	25 May	Mount Albert	6	Devonport	2	Fowld's Park, 3:00
Round 6	1 June	City	W	Richmond	L	Carlaw Park 2, 1:30
-	1 June	Marist	16	Newton	0	Auckland Domain, 1:30
-	1 June	Ponsonby	5	Mount Albert	2	Auckland Domain, 3:00
Round 7	8 June	Marist	19	Mount Albert	11	Carlaw Park 2, 1:45
-	8 June	City	13	Newton	9	Auckland Domain 1, 3:00
-	8 June	Devonport	33	Ponsonby	11	Devonport Domain, 3:00
Round 8	15 June	Richmond	10	Newton	0	Outer Domain, 1:45
-	15 June	Devonport	?	Marist	?	Carlaw Park 2, 3:00
-	15 June	Mount Albert	11	City	10	Auckland Domain, 1:45
Round 9	22 June	Richmond	2	Mount Albert	0	Carlaw Park 2, 1:30
-	22 June	Devonport	5	City	5	Auckland Domain 1, 1:30
-	22 June	Marist	8	Ponsonby	2	Auckland Domain 1, 3:00
Round 10	29 June	Richmond	11	Devonport	0	Auckland Domain, 1:45
-	29 June	Mount Albert	6	Newton	0	Auckland domain, 3:00
-	29 June	Ponsonby	2	City	0	Outer Domain, 1:45
Round 11	6 July	Devonport	11	Newton	3	Carlaw Park 2, 1:45
-	6 July	Richmond	29	Ponsonby	0	Auckland Domain 1, 1:45
-	6 July	Marist	5	City	3	Auckland Domain 1, 3:00
Round 12	13 July	Newton	?	Ponsonby	?	Carlaw Park 2, 3:00
-	13 July	Richmond	?	Marist	?	Carlaw Park 2, 1:30
-	13 July	Devonport	?	Mount Albert	?	Devonport Domain, 3:00
Round 13	20 July	City	23	Newton	5	Carlaw Park 2, 1:30
-	20 July	Marist	10	Mount Albert	2	Auckland Domain 1, 1:45
-	20 July	Devonport	12	Ponsonby	10	Auckland Domain 1, 3:00
Round 14	27 July	Ponsonby	?	Mount Albert	?	Auckland Domain 2, 3:00
-	27 July	Newton	11	Marist	3	Carlaw Park 2, 1:30
Playoff round (top 4)	3 August	City	5	Richmond	2	Auckland Domain 1, 1:30
-	3 August	Marist	WBD	Devonport	LBD	Auckland Domain 5, 1:30
Round ?	10 August	Newton	11	Marist	3	Auckland Domain 2, 3:00
Final	17 August	Marist	3	Richmond	0	Carlaw Park 2, 3:00

=== Stallard Cup (reserve and senior B knockout) ===
The decision was made for the Stallard Cup to have senior reserve teams competing with the senior B sides. In round 1 Papakura recorded a win over the Mount Albert reserves despite playing much of the second half short after Smith left the field injured and Len Taylor later left with concussion. Marist Reserves won the competition defeating City Reserves in the final 16–3 with the match played as the curtain-raiser to the first test between New Zealand and Australia.

Stallard Cup results
	Date		Score		Score	Venue
Round 1	24 August	City Reserves	27	Devonport Reserves	7	Auckland Domain 2, 1:45
-	24 August	Richmond Reserves	25	Newton Reserves	0	Auckland Domain 2, 3:00
-	24 August	Ponsonby Reserves	18	Green Lane Senior B	5	Auckland Domain 6, 3:00
-	24 August	Papakura Senior B	14	Mount Albert Reserves	11	Papakura, 3:00
Consolation match	31 August	Green Lane Senior B	11	Mount Albert Reserves	5	Auckland Domain 5, 1:45
Round 2	31 August	Ponsonby Reserves	W	Point Chevalier Senior B	L	Outer Domain, 3:00
-	31 August	Richmond Reserves	2	Marist Reserves	2	Auckland Domain 1, 1:45
Semifinal	31 August	City Reserves	10	Papakura Senior B	7	Auckland Domain 1, 3:00
Second round replay	7 September	Marist Reserves	16	Richmond Reserves	7	Carlaw Park 2, 3:00
Preliminary final	14 September	Marist Reserves	19	Ponsonby Reserves	8	Carlaw Park 2, 1:30
Final	28 September	Marist Reserves	16	City Reserves	3	Carlaw Park 1, 1:30

== Senior B (Sharman Cup) ==
Otahuhu won the Sharman Cup when they won the Senior B championship competition and were congratulated on it at the junior management committee meeting on 9 July by chairman Mr. D. Wilkie.

=== Standings ===
Team	Pld	W	D	L	F	A	Pts
Otahuhu United	9	8	0	1	135	16	16
Papakura	9	7	0	2	133	50	14
Point Chevalier	9	1	0	7	63	102	2
Waiuku	9	1	0	7	58	221	2

=== Results ===
	Date		Score		Score	Venue
Round 1	4 May	Papakura	17	Point Chevalier	3	Prince Edward Park, Papakura, 3:00
-	4 May	Otahuhu	21	Waiuku	3	Sturgess Park, Otahuhu, 3:00
Round 2	11 May	Waiuku	11	Papakura	15	Massey Park, Waiuku, 3:00
-	11 May	Point Chevalier	0	Otahuhu	12	Point Chevalier, 3:00
Round 3	18 May	Papakura	2	Otahuhu	0	Papakura, 3:00
-	18 May	Waiuku	24	Point Chevalier	15	Massey Park, Waiuku, 3:00
Round 4	25 May	Papakura	47	Waiuku	9	Prince Edward Park, Papakura, 3:00
-	25 May	Otahuhu	20	Point Chevalier	2	Otahuhu, 3:00
Round 5	1 June	Point Chevalier	0	Papakura	2	Point Chevalier, 3:00
-	1 June	Waiuku	4	Otahuhu	32	Massey Park, Waiuku
Round 6	8 June	Otahuhu	10	Papakura	3	Sturgess Park, Otahuhu, 3:00
-	8 June	Point Chevalier	38	Waiuku	2	Point Chevalier, 3:00
Round 7	15 June	Papakura	12	Point Chevalier	5	Prince Edward Park, Papakura, 3:00
-	15 June	Waiuku	0	Otahuhu	20	Massey Park, Waiuku
Round 8	22 June	Waiuku	5	Papakura	33	Waiuku, 3:00
-	22 June	Otahuhu	13	Point Chevalier	0	Sturgess Park, Otahuhu, 3:00
Round 9	29 June	Papakura	2	Otahuhu	7	Prince Edward Park, Papakura, 3:00
-	29 June	Pont Chevalier	?	Waiuku	?	Point Chevalier, 3:00

=== Senior B knockout (Walmesley Colts Shield) ===
Green Lane's newly formed senior team was added to the Senior B ‘knockout’ competition which was a ‘knockout’ competition in name only. It was in fact played over 5 rounds with Papakura winning it. The New Zealand Herald stated that they won it with 51 points for and 8 against though this did not line up with the reported scores. Otahuhu were second, Point Chevalier, Green Lane and Waiuku trailing.

==== Standings and results ====
Team	Pld	W	D	L	F	A	Pts
Papakura	4	4	0	0	47	15	8
Otahuhu United	4	3	0	1	84	22	6
Point Chevalier	4	2	0	2	37	27	4
Green Lane	4	1	0	3	32	47	2
Waiuku	4	0	0	4	12	101	0

	Date		Score		Score	Venue
Round 1	6 July	Papakura	6	Green Lane	5	Morningside, 3pm
-	6 July	Otahuhu	40	Waiuku	2	Manukau 3pm
Round 2	13 July	Otahuhu	30	Green Lane	9	Manukau, 3pm
-	13 July	Waiuku	5	Point Chevalier	25	Waiuku, 3pm
Round 3	20 July	Point Chevalier	3	Otahuhu	7	Point Chevalier, 3pm
-	20 July	Papakura	25	Waiuku	3	Papakura, 3pm
Round 4	27 July	Point Chevalier	0	Papakura	8	Point Chevalier, 3pm
-	27 July	Waiuku	2	Green Lane	11	Waiuku, 3pm
Round 5	3 August	Point Chevalier	9	Green Lane	7	Point Chevalier, 3:30
-	3 August	Papakura	8	Otahuhu	7	Manukau, 3pm

=== Foster Shield ===
After their August 10 match Green Lane protested the result on the grounds that the referee had blown for full time early. It was later decided that the match would be replayed if it would have any bearing on the championship. After Waiuku's match with Point Chevalier their bus was involved in a collision with a car. The rear axle was broken though nobody was injured.

Senior B Foster Shield
	Date		Score		Score	Venue
Round 1	10 August	Waiuku	3	Papakura	22	Waiuku, 3pm
-	10 August	Point Chevalier	W	Green Lane	L	Point Chevalier, 3pm
Round 2	17 August	Papakura	10	Point Chevalier	8	Ellerslie Reserve, 3pm
-	17 August	Green Lane	?	Waiuku	?	Papakura, 3pm
Friendly match	7 September	Point Chevalier	24	Waiuku	0	Point Chevalier, 3pm
Final	7 September	Papakura	6	Green Lane	2	Papakura, 3pm

== Other club matches and junior grades ==
=== Junior grade competitions ===
Nominations were received at the beginning of the season for 8 senior grade sides, 16 for the third grade (to be split into two sections), 11 fourth grade sides, 10 fifth grade sides, 8 sixth grade sides, and 4 seventh grade sides. There were weighing in committees formed at Papakura and Otahuhu while weighing in began nightly in late April at the League rooms in Courthouse Lane.

Richmond once again won the Davis Points Shield for being the most successful junior club in Auckland. They continued their dominance of this trophy.

==== 2nd Grade (Hayward Shield) ====
Richmond Rovers won the championship by 5 points over Ponsonby. Their 7–4 defeat of Ponsonby in the second to last round sealed the title. Richmond also won the knockout competition when they beat RV by 13 points to 6. In the semi finals Richmond defeated Ponsonby 20-2 while RV defeated a Mangere team which had only entered the grade in the knockout competition. Ponsonby beat them 8–0.

Team	Pld	W	D	L	F	A	Pts
Richmond Rovers	13	11	0	2	195	48	22
Ponsonby United	13	8	1	4	84	43	17
RV	12	6	2	3	95	87	14
Glen Ora	12	4	2	5	77	69	10
Mount Albert United	12	4	1	4	47	61	9
Papakura	12	2	0	9	62	147	4
Manukau Rovers	13	2	0	10	47	152	4

==== 3rd Grade (Walker Cup) ====
Ponsonby won the 3rd Grade championship (Walker Cup) and the Murray Cup for winning the knockout competition. A. Britton of Ellerslie was named the most sportsmanlike player. The competition was divided into sections though aside from the opening round draw it was unclear which teams were in which section and they all played one another anyway. Ponsonby won section A and City won section B. On July 27 they met in the championship final with the match drawn 11-11. A week later in the final replay Ponsonby won 15–12. Then however, on September 21 they met again in a match advertised as the championship final with Ponsonby winning 19–13. The game was a curtain-raiser to the Auckland v Australia match. Ponsonby won the knockout competition with a 16–10 win over Ōtāhuhu in the final. Glen Ora initially entered a side but ultimately took no part. Akarana B withdrew after 7 weeks, while Manukau A withdrew after 8, then Marist B pulled out of the competition after 12 weeks, and then Northcote followed towards the end of the season after their 15th week.

Team	Pld	W	D	L	F	A	Pts
Ponsonby United	14	10	2	1	175	92	22
City Rovers	15	10	2	2	112	69	22
Ōtāhuhu Rovers	17	13	0	4	278	104	26
Manukau Rovers B	16	9	0	4	161	76	18
Richmond Rovers	15	8	1	3	129	73	17
Ellerslie United	15	4	1	4	66	43	9
Marist Old Boys A	13	3	1	6	103	111	7
Akarana A	14	2	2	8	93	106	6
Manukau Rovers A	8	2	1	3	61	53	5
North Shore	14	2	0	6	50	118	4
Northcote & Birkenhead Ramblers	13	1	1	8	57	110	3
Marist Old Boys B	9	1	1	3	49	40	3
Akarana B	6	0	0	4	3	68	0
Green Lane	9	0	0	7	13	219	0

==== 4th Grade (Hospital Cup) ====
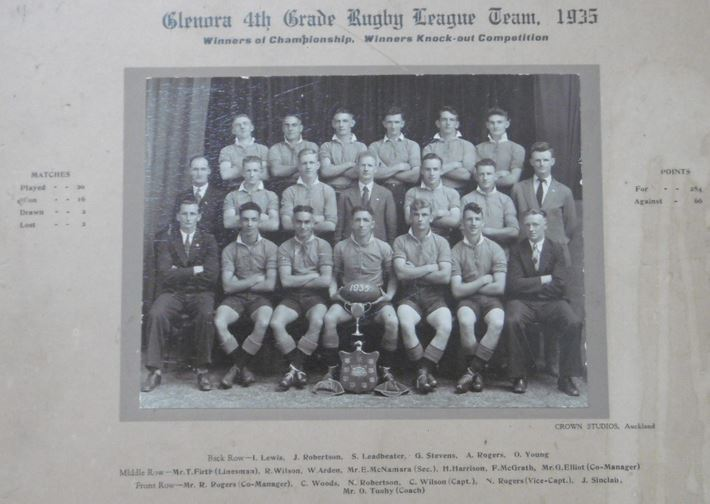
Glenora 4th Grade

Glenora won the 4th Grade championship, taking out the Hospital Cup, they tied with Newton in the knockout competition for the Kiwi Shield. There were many matches with no scores reported so the below standings are somewhat incomplete. The Glenora side which won the championship in their team photo showed a 20 played, 16 win, 2 draw, 2 loss record which also included 6 knockout matches (the first of which was lost). Glenora beat Newton 25–10 in the preliminary knockout semi final, with Newton then beating City a week later in the next semi final. In the final Glenora and Newton drew 3–3 with 10 minutes extra time played but with no additional scoring so the title was shared. On June 22 the Northcote side was listed in the newspaper as Northcote High School though this was most likely in error as the team regularly played at the Northcote High School but as the sport of rugby league was not played in high schools for many years it is unlikely it was an actual official school side.

Team	Pld	W	D	L	F	A	Pts
Glenora	14	12	1	1	144	43	25
City Rovers	15	11	0	1	166	33	22
Richmond Rovers	15	8	1	4	88	53	17
Newton Rangers	15	7	1	2	115	32	15
Papakura	13	6	2	4	122	86	14
Point Chevalier A	14	5	1	4	76	65	11
Mount Albert United	14	3	0	5	39	89	6
Northcote & Birkenhead Ramblers	15	2	0	5	39	68	4
Point Chevalier B	12	2	0	9	31	185	4
Ponsonby United	14	0	1	10	25	111	1
Ōtāhuhu Rovers	13	0	0	9	32	112	0

==== 5th Grade (Endean Shield) ====
Richmond A won the Endean Shield when they took out the 5th Grade championship and they followed it up with a win in the knockout competition to claim the Milicich Cup. Their final win came over Ellerslie by 7 points to 2 on September 7. Richmond A had beaten Richmond B 29–0 in one semi final while Ellerslie had beaten Akarana 11–0 in the other semi final. A handful of matches did not have the scores reported so the for and against records are incomplete, especially in the case of Devonport who did not have 6 scores reported.

Team	Pld	W	D	L	F	A	Pts
Richmond Rovers A	14	13	1	0	234	38	27
Ellerslie United	14	10	1	2	114	37	21
Newton Rangers	14	7	3	3	76	71	17
Devonport United	14	7	2	5	76	69	16
Akarana	14	6	3	5	43	56	15
Papakura	14	2	3	8	49	151	7
Richmond Rovers B	14	3	1	10	50	131	7
Mount Albert United	14	0	0	13	13	102	0

==== 6th Grade (Rhodes Shield) ====
Richmond won the 6th grade championship for the Rhodes Shield and completed the double by taking out the Hammill Cup awarded to the winners of the knockout competition. Point Chevalier withdrew after 9 rounds while Marist initially entered a team but withdrew in the early weeks of the competition possibly not having played a game. There were 8 games without results reported so the scoring is incomplete.

Team	Pld	W	D	L	F	A	Pts
Richmond Rovers	12	9	1	0	177	14	19
City Rovers	12	7	2	1	106	40	16
Northcote & Birkenhead Ramblers	12	5	0	5	53	82	10
Devonport United	14	2	1	7	42	78	5
Glenora	13	1	1	7	18	90	3
Point Chevalier	7	0	1	4	5	97	1

==== 7th Grade (Myers Cup) ====
Richmond won the 7th Grade championship for the Myers Cup. They also won the Oval Shield for the knockout competition (played over 3 weeks) and the Walmsley Miniature Shield for winning the special round which was also played over 3 weeks. In the Oval Shield they beat Avondale 58-0 and City 17–0, while in the Walmsley Miniature Shield they beat Avondale 6-3 and City 5–0. Initially Ellerslie entered a side but they lost in week 1 by 17 points to 2 to City Rovers and after being listed to play Avondale in week 2 they withdrew from the competition.

Team	Pld	W	D	L	F	A	Pts
Richmond Rovers	6	6	0	0	32	13	12
City Rovers	7	2	0	5	42	36	4
Avondale	8	2	0	4	12	22	4
Ellerslie United	2	0	0	1	2	17	0

==== Schoolboys (Newport Shield) ====
Richmond again were successful in the schoolboys grade winning the Newport Shield when they took out the championship. Devonport won the Eccles Memorial Shield by finishing runners-up. Devonport also won the knockout competition with the Ernest Davis Cup awarded as the prize when they beat Green Lane A in the final on October 12. The Avondale Convent team represented the school at the present day location of St Mary's Catholic School in Avondale. The Devonport team was coached by former senior player Matt Scott.

Richmond also won the Walmsley Midget Shield, with the best uniformed team being named as Richmond who won the E. Bennett Cup.

Team	Pld	W	D	L	F	A	Pts
Richmond	17	12	1	0	280	16	25
Devonport	18	10	2	2	231	26	22
Northcote	17	10	1	1	240	43	21
Marist	17	7	0	6	164	88	14
Ōtāhuhu	16	4	0	4	33	77	8
Green Lane A	10	3	1	1	39	11	7
Ellerslie	17	3	0	5	52	100	6
Akarana	18	2	0	8	38	99	4
Avondale	23	2	0	8	23	225	4
Green Lane B	11	2	0	4	12	150	4
City	18	1	1	7	20	124	3
Avondale Convent	18	1	0	10	8	181	2

===== 7-a-side (Robert Reid Memorial Shield) =====
Marist won the Robert Reid Memorial Shield for winning the seven-a-side competition with the runners-up being Richmond. There were typically 2-3 matches played each weekend at Carlaw Park between the 1st grade matches or at halftime. Due to their short nature the majority of the matches only featured 1 or 2 tries with several games ending 0-0.

Team	Pld	W	D	L	F	A	Pts
Marist	12	8	2	1	12	0	18
Green Lane	11	6	4	1	15	3	16
Richmond A	10	4	2	3	6	3	10
Avondale Convent	5	1	2	2	3	3	4
Northcote	11	1	2	3	3	9	4
Ōtāhuhu	6	0	4	2	0	6	4
Avondale	7	1	1	4	3	12	3
Richmond B	10	1	1	5	3	15	3
Ellerslie	6	0	2	1	0	0	0

== Auckland representative season ==
Messrs. Ernie Asher, Bert Avery, and William Mincham were re-elected as Auckland selectors for the season. Archie Ferguson, and William Liversidge had also been nominated. There had been some debate around the number and makeup of the selectors. Richmond Rovers had been in favour of just one selector along with one other club, though 5 clubs favoured 3 selectors. Newton Rangers provided a letter suggesting that “no nominee be a member of clubs or of the management committee”. Jim Rukutai said that “only the most suitable men should be considered, irrespective of club interests” with William Mincham in support.

The season began with two matches at Carlaw Park with Auckland B taking on South Auckland in the curtain-raiser and Auckland A playing Taranaki. The matches were played to assist the selectors in choosing the North Island side for their annual match with the South Island.

During the representative season it was decided to go on a southern tour. The team group of players they selected for the tour were:- Backs – Claude Dempsey (Newton), Bert Cooke (Richmond), Lou Brown (City), Cliff Hall (Devonport), Arthur Kay (Ponsonby), Brian Riley (Ponsonby), Wilf Hassan (Mount Albert), Eric Fletcher (Richmond), and Ted Brimble (Newton), Forwards – Jim Laird (Marist), Lou Hutt (Ponsonby), Hugh Simpson (Devonport), Des Herring (Mount Albert), Cliff Satherley (Richmond), Harold Tetley (Richmond), Dan Keane (Marist). The team selected was not the best available as the better players were kept in Auckland to continue training for their match against the touring Australian side. Chairman C. Grey Campbell acted as manager and Thomas McClymont as coach.

Late in the season Auckland selected a schoolboys representative team to play a Northland side. Auckland won the Golden Bloom banner by winning the match. Auckland was coached by Lou Brown who presented his English test jersey, acquired whilst playing for New Zealand to the player of the day, which was R. Bradley of the Richmond club.

=== Fixtures ===
==== Auckland B v South Auckland (Waikato) ====
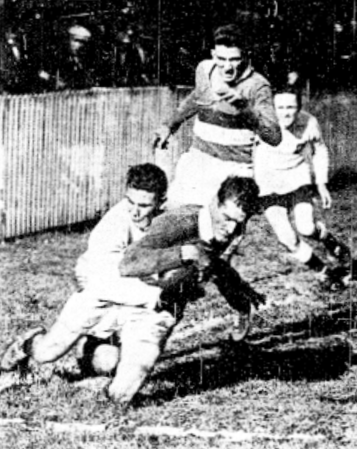
Brian Riley (Auckland) tackling Ken Peckham (South Auckland) as he crosses for their only try.

Cliff Hall scored twice for Auckland B while Richmond's winger, Ernest McNeil got one try as did Steve Watene and Harold Tetley. For South Auckland, their lone try scorer was Ken Peckham who had played for Ponsonby from 1926 to 1930 on 26 occasions. Their goal kicker was George Tittleton who transferred to Auckland in 1936 from the Taupiri club and joined Richmond where he played for three seasons. He debuted for New Zealand later in the year in one of the tests against Australia and also played for New Zealand twice more in 1936 against England after his move to Auckland.

3 August	Auckland B	17-9	South Auckland	Carlaw Park 1
1:30	Try: Cliff Hall 2, Ernest McNeil, Steve Watene, Harold Tetley; Con: Claude Dempsey		Try: Kenneth Peckham; Con: George Tittleton; Pen: George Tittleton 2	Referee: Maurice Wetherill

==== Auckland A v Taranaki ====
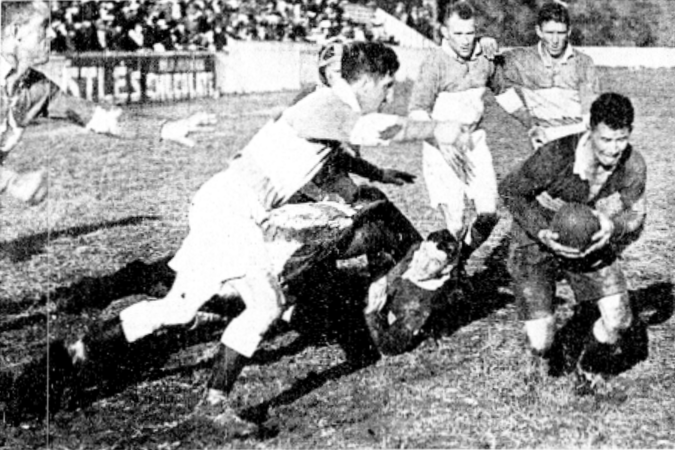
Cliff Satherley about to tackle J. Tamatea (Taranaki). On the extreme left is Lou Hutt with Des Herring and Maurice Quirke in the background.

Bert Cooke had been originally selected to play but injured his shoulder so was replaced in the side. Taranaki put on a good display in the first half and only trailed by a point at the break before Auckland A ran away with the match. Ted Mincham scored three tries for Auckland, and Arthur Kay two with Cliff Satherley converting three of their nine tries and Norm Campbell two others.

3 August	Auckland A	37-14	Taranaki	Carlaw Park 1
3:00	Try: Ted Mincham 3, Arthur Kay 2, Roy Powell, Lou Hutt, Cliff Satherley, Des Herring; Con: Norm Campbell 2, Cliff Satherley 3		Try: W Keogh, Scott; Con: Charles Bedford; Pen: Charles Bedford 3	Referee: Percy Rogers

==== Inter-Island match (Courtney Silver Football Trophy) ====
This was the 10th inter-island match stretching back to 1925. The North Island had won 7, the South Island had won 1 in 1929, with a draw in 1930. The North Island had 3 players debuting, Bill Telford, Ted Mincham, and W. Large (Hawke's Bay).

17 August	North Island	19-18	South Island	Carlaw Park 1
3:00	Try: Lou Brown, Bert Cooke 2, Roy Powell, Lou Hutt; Con: Cliff Satherley 2		Try: Bill McNeight, Billy Glynn, P Serra 2 Con: Jim Amos, L Young 2	Referee: Maurice Wetherill

==== Auckland A v Auckland B (Auckland Trial) ====
In the second half A.S. O’Connor of Wellington replaced Frank Halloran. This had been arranged prior to the match as the selectors wanted to look at players in view of the upcoming Australian visit. A.S. O’Connor was a former Canterbury player who had recently moved to Wellington.

17 August	Auckland A	22-19	Auckland B	Carlaw Park 1
1:30	Try: Eric Fletcher, Joe Woods, William Glover, Joseph Hapi; Con: Eric Fletcher 4 Pen: Eric Fletcher		Try: Clarry McNeil 2, Cliff Hall, Brian Riley, Wilfred Brimble; Con: George Kerr; Pen: George Kerr	Referee: Stuart Billman

==== Wellington v Auckland (Southern tour match) ====
Former All Black Herbert Lilburne had switched codes and played for Wellington.

7 September	Wellington	27-39	Auckland	Newtown Park, Wellington
3:00	Try: R Todd, Herbert Lilburne, A O'Connor, Dick Moisley 2 Con: A O’Connor 4 Pen: A O’Connor, Herbert Lilburne		Try: Bert Cooke 2, Lou Brown 2, Ted Brimble, Des Herring, Lou Hutt 2, Harold Tetley; Con: Cliff Satherley 6	Attendance: 3,000; Referee: Vic Simpson

==== West Coast v Auckland (Southern tour match) ====
Lou Brown played spectacularly for Auckland, scoring 4 tries. Late in the first half Ted Brimble injured his leg and had to go off. Claude Dempsey came on to fullback with the backline reshuffled so Brian Riley could go into the five eighths. John Anderson who would later move to Auckland and become one of the most successful goal kickers in the competition was injured in a club match days earlier and was unable to play for the West Coast. The crowd of 2,000 was particularly impressive for a 3pm kickoff on a weekday in a relatively sparsely populated region.

11 September	West Coast	14-32	Auckland	Victoria Park, Greymouth
3:00	Try: A Williams, Johnny Dodds, T O'Connor, G Scott; Con: Jim Calder		Try: Lou Brown 4, Brian Riley 2, Cliff Hall, Des Herring; Con: Cliff Satherley 3, Eric Fletcher	Attendance: 2,000; Referee: Alf Fielding

==== Canterbury v Auckland (Southern tour match) ====
Cliff Hall got injured in the first half and was replaced by Ted Brimble, while Dan Keane replaced Jim Laird. Brimble had been injured in the previous match and was again injured during play in the match with Canterbury but after going off he was able to return to the field. For Canterbury Leonard Stuart came on to replace Leslie Wehner who was injured also.

14 September	Canterbury	13-26	Auckland	Monica Park, Christchurch
3:00	Try: Ces Davison, R H Whitley, Leonard Stuart; Con: Leslie Young; Pen: Ces Davison		Try: Bert Cooke, Lou Brown 2, Brian Riley, Arthur Kay, Dan Keane; Con: Cliff Satherley 4	Attendance: 3,000; Referee: H.A. King

==== Auckland v Australia (Australian tour match) ====
Australian legend Dave Brown who was renowned for his point scoring feats and was referred to as "the Bradman of league" scored 10 of Australia's 16 points. This was the first match Australia had played in New Zealand since their 1919 tour.

21 September	Auckland	8-16	Australia	Carlaw Park 1
3:00	Try: Ted Mincham, Bill Telford; Pen: Ted Mincham		Try: Dave Brown 2, Frank Curran, Jim Gibbs; Con: Dave Brown; Pen: Dave Brown	Attendance: 15,000; Referee: Maurice Wetherill

==== Auckland Province v Australia (Australian tour match) ====
9 October	Auckland Province	18-36	Australia	Carlaw Park 1
3:00	Try: Eric Fletcher, Harold Tetley; Con: Eric Fletcher; Pen: Eric Fletcher 5		Try: Ray Hines, Laurie Ward, Bill Mahon, Edward Collins 3, Jim Gibbs 2 Con: Ross McKinnon 6	Referee: Wilfred Simpson

=== Auckland representative matches played and scorers ===
No	Name	Club Team	Play	Tries	Con	Pen	Points
1	Cliff Satherley	Richmond	5	1	16	0	35
2	Lou Brown	City	6	9	0	0	27
3	Ted Mincham	Richmond	2	4	0	0	12
4	Arthur Kay	Ponsonby	5	3	0	0	9
4	Lou Hutt	Ponsonby	5	3	0	0	9
4	Bert Cooke	Richmond	4	3	0	0	9
4	Des Herring	Mount Albert	4	3	0	0	9
4	Brian Riley	Ponsonby	2	3	0	0	9
9	Norm Campbell	Marist	1	0	2	0	4
10	Harold Tetley	Richmond	4	1	0	0	3
10	Ted Brimble	Newton	4	1	0	0	3
10	Roy Powell	Richmond	2	1	0	0	3
10	Bill Telford	Richmond	2	1	0	0	3
10	Dan Keane	Marist	2	1	0	0	3
10	Cliff Hall	Devonport	4	1	0	0	3
16	Eric Fletcher	Richmond	2	0	1	0	2
17	Jim Laird	Marist	5	0	0	0	0
17	Wilf Hassan	Marist	2	0	0	0	0
17	Roy Bright	Ponsonby	1	0	0	0	0
17	Maurice S Quirke	Newton	2	0	0	0	0
17	Claude Dempsey	Newton	2	0	0	0	0
17	Hugh Simpson	Devonport	2	0	0	0	0
17	Stan Prentice	Richmond	1	0	0	0	0

== Tāmaki (Auckland Māori) representative team ==
The New Zealand Māori Advisory Board was granted the use of Carlaw Park on July 31 for the first Waitangi Shield challenge match of the season between Auckland Māori and Taranaki Māori. The following players were selected to practice at Carlaw Park on Wednesday 24 July for the match against Taranaki Māori for the Waitangi Shield: A. Nathan, P. Nathan, D. Nathan, A. Kelsall, Skelton, Steve Watene, E. Kirkwood, A. Wharepouri, D. Hapi, Joseph Hapi, Ratu, Hira, Lou Brown, Bill Turei, W Murray, C. Faulkner, P. Kauhoa, P. Awhitu, W. Rangi, J. Stanaway, K. Tarawhiti, and P. Tepana. The match played on July 31 ultimately turned out to be Takahiwai, representing Northland Māori in their first ever representative match. Tāmaki held on to the Waitangi Shield with a comfortable 24–8 win with New Zealand international Lou Brown scoring 2 tries. They played further matches against Hawke's Bay Māori, and Waikato Māori. They won both matches to retain the Shield.

=== Fixtures ===
==== (Waitangi Shield) Tāmaki v Takahiwai (Northland) ====
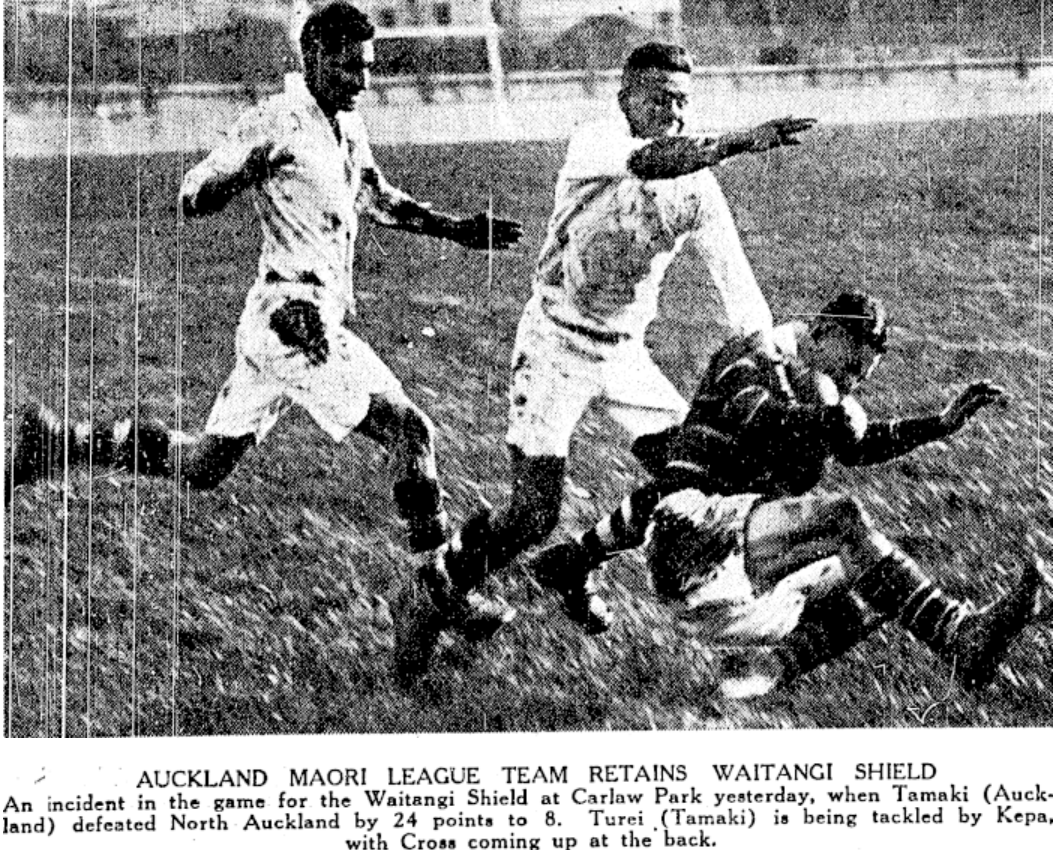
Bill Turei (Tamaki) being tackled with Kepa and Cross coming across for Takahiwai.

The game was said to have been very scrappy with a lot of long passing and with the Northland players not seeming to have a good understanding of the game. Lou Brown who was regarded as one of the best attacking backs in the world in this era was criticised for seemingly allowing his opposite to beat him just to make a game of it. Despite this he scored two tries and the Auckland Māori (Tamaki) side won relatively easily.

31 July	Tāmaki	24-8	Takahiwai (Northland)	Carlaw Park 1
3:00	Try: C Faulkner, Lou Brown 2, Jack Tawhai, Joseph Hapi, P Kauhoa; Con: Bill Turei 2, P Kauhoa		Try: P Jones, D Jones; Pen: Rata	Referee: Stuart Billman

==== (Waitangi Shield) Tāmaki v Hawke's Bay Māori ====
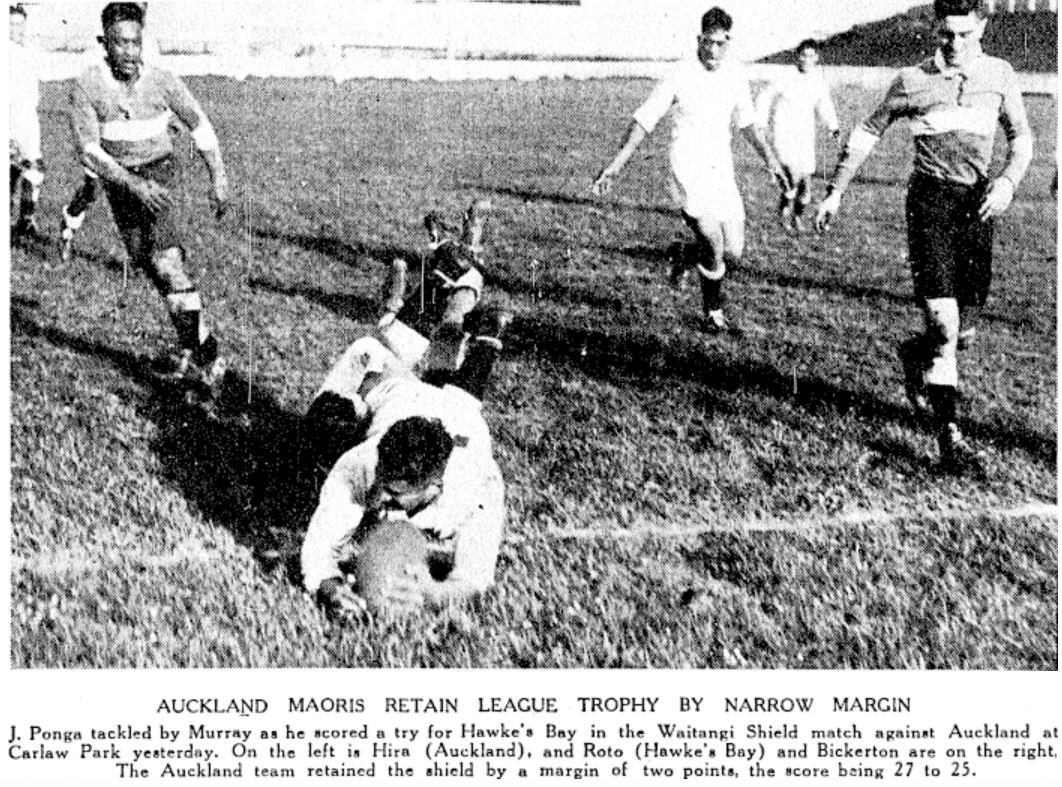
J. Ponga scoring for Hawke's Bay Māori.

The Hawke's Bay team was described as being very heavy with an average weight of 11st 10lb in the backs and 13st, 10lb in the forwards. The Hawke's Bay forwards dominated the play, although Tāmaki's Steve Watene was described as the best forward on the field. It was the brilliance of the Tāmaki backs which saw them win an entertaining match 27–25 with Lou Brown playing in the centres scoring 2 tries and setting up 2 others. Hapi who was a former Hawke's Bay rugby representative also played well for Tāmaki on the wing.

28 August	Tāmaki	27-25	Hawke's Bay Māori	Carlaw Park 1
3:00	Try: Bill Turei, Lou Brown 2, Joseph Hapi 2, W Skelton, Steve Watene; Con: Bill Turei, Steve Watene 2		Try: J Ponga, M Purcell 3, Taylor; Con: J Ransfield, D Wano; Pen: J Ransfield 3	Referee: A Saunders

==== (Waitangi Shield) Tāmaki v Waikato Māori ====
Noel Bickerton was unavailable due to injury, as was Steve Watene, however the Tāmaki team lost 2 players to injury during the match and Steve Watene had to come on to play. With the scores tied 8-8 he scored what proved to be the match winning try in the corner. In the evening both teams were entertained at the Prince Arthur Hotel.

11 September	Tāmaki	11-8	Waikato Māori	Carlaw Park 1
3:00	Try: Bill Turei, Awhitu, Steve Watene; Pen: Bill Turei		Try: H Mason, N Turner; Con: H Mason

=== Tāmaki (Auckland Māori) representative matches played and scorers ===
No	Name	Club Team	Play	Tries	Con	Pen	Points
1	Bill Turei	City	2	2	3	1	14
2	Lou Brown	City	2	4	0	0	12
3	Steve Watene	City	2	2	2	0	10
4	Joseph Hapi	City	3	3	0	0	9
5	P Kauhoa	Newton	2	1	1	0	5
6	John Tawhai	City	3	1	0	0	3
6	W Skelton	Ponsonby	3	1	0	0	3
6	C Faulkner	?	2	1	0	0	3
6	P Awhitu	Newton	1	1	0	0	3
10	J Hira	?	3	0	0	0	0
10	Reginald Kelsall	Newton	3	0	0	0	0
10	Alex Nathan	Newton	3	0	0	0	0
10	W Murray	Ponsonby	2	0	0	0	0
10	D Nathan	Newton	2	0	0	0	0
10	Patuwa Nathan	City	2	0	0	0	0
10	Noel Bickerton	Richmond	1	0	0	0	0
10	Roberts	?	1	0	0	0	0
10	Johnson	?	1	0	0	0	0
10	Jackie Rata	City	1	0	0	0	0
10	E Kirkwood	?	1	0	0	0	0

== Annual general meetings, club news, and senior registrations and transfers ==
- Auckland Rugby League Junior Management Committee/Control Board held their annual meeting on March 26 with all clubs represented and Mr. D. Wilkie presiding. The annual report showed an increase in the number of teams in 1934 with “well over a thousand grade players registered”. All winning teams from the various grades were congratulated. It was also stated that the league had “definitely decided to start a senior B grade competition to meet the needs of district extension” with details to be finalised. The committee was elected as follows: Messrs. D. Wilkie, A Hopkinson, T. Chernside, I. Stonex, G. Taylor, E. Chapman, C.G. Howe, T. Carey, and G. Short. Mr. D Wilkie was re-elected chairman. It was decided that the nominations for all grade teams would close on April 23, and opening day would be Saturday, May 4. At the June 4 meeting the issue of weighing of players was discussed. Notably the “desirability of compelling players to weigh in on Saturday evening after the match instead of having until Tuesday”. The chairman and members agreed that a change was needed and would consider the proposal. On June 29 several junior teams defaulted their matches after a radio station announced that “the principal matches in the Auckland Rugby League competition will be played” which was taken to mean that junior fixtures would not take place. Chairman Mr. D. Wilkie said “that the clubs should know that the only official source of information regarding fixtures was the rugby league office and they decided to “circularise the clubs in this matter”. A special subcommittee was appointed to address the issue of junior clubs concerned with clashes in colours of playing uniforms. Messrs. W. Mincham and Jim Rukutai were placed in charge of the committee.
- Auckland Rugby League Ladies Committee started their charity work early in the season. They visited Harold Walmsley who was a well-known supporter of the game. They had previously organised the second annual ball which was held during the visit of Western Suburbs the previous season and were currently planning the King's Silver Jubilee ball. At the board of control meeting on March 27 it was “resolved to approve a proposal by the A.R.L. ladies committee to hold a jubilee ball early in May in honour of His Majesty the King, supreme patron of the rugby league”. Messrs. J.W. Probert and J Rukutai were declared re-elected as representatives on the board.
- Auckland Rugby League Primary School Management Committee held their annual meeting in late March. The report noted that nine teams had taken part in the championship competition in the 1934 season, with seven playing in the seven-a-aside tournament for midgets. The following officers were elected: patron, Dr. G Pezaro; president, Mr. R.E. Newport; chairman, Mr. A. Stanley; vice-presidents, same as last year, with the addition of Messrs. J Sayegh and C Brockliss; secretary, Mr. L. Rout; selector, Mr. S. Dickie. They also altered their constitution so that schoolboys should not exceed 7st 7lb, and not be more than 14 years of age at the beginning of the season. They held a carnival on June 3 at Carlaw Park with a series of matches being played. Teams competing were Otahuhu, Avondale Convent, Akarana, City, Marist, Avondale, Devonport, Ellerslie, Richmond, and Northcote. While in the seven-a-side competition the teams were Avondale Convent, Otahuhu, Green Lane, Akarana, Ellerslie, and Avondale. Mr. E. B. Bennett donated a cup for the “best-equipped school team”. The management committee decided to ask Mr. R.E. Newport, president of the primary school management, to act as the adjudicator of the trophy.
- Auckland Rugby League Referees Association held their annual meeting on March 26 with Mr. Les Bull presiding. Bull stressed the need for “greater uniformity in the application of rules”. The following officers were elected: president, Mr. L. Bull; vice-president, Mr. J. G. McGowatt; hon vice-presidents same as last year; delegate to the Auckland control board, Mr. W. Mincham; delegate to New Zealand Referees’ Association, Mr. L. Bull; honorary treasurer, Mr. P. Rogers; honorary auditor, Mr. A Chapman; executive committee, the chairman, vice-president, secretary, treasurer, and Messrs. A.E. Chapman, S.A. Fisher, and M. Wetherill; appointments board, Mr. A. Rae; examination committee, Messrs. J.G. McGowatt and T. Hill; social committee, Messrs. W. Mincham, R. Otto and M. Wetherill. At the ARL annual meeting on April 9 a shield “with silver plates upon which to record the names of life members was presented to the Referees’ Association” was presented by chairman H. Walmsley with Mr. L. Bull accepting the shield on behalf of the association. It was later decided that the Walmsley Shield would be presented for life membership and suitably inscribed. At the control board meeting of April 17 Mr. Arthur Ball was added as the third member of the Appointments’ Board. At their May 13 meeting they made changes to their executive with Mr. A. Chapman taking the position of treasurer, Mr. B. Emirali to auditor, and Mr. T. Evans was added to the committee. While Messrs. A. Lennie and A. Farrell were elected new members while Mr. Freeman Thompson was nominated for membership. A donation was made by vice-president, Mr. J. Pennington, and a trophy from Mr. S Jackson. At the June 5 Board of Control meeting it was decided to make arrangements so referees and players knew which field on the Auckland Domain they were playing on so they could start on time. The listings in the newspapers typically just said that they were playing at the Domain without stating which field, which caused problems as there were several fields. At the July 3 ARL Board of Control meeting chairman Mr. G, Grey Campbell said he “was concerned about many incidents of late tackling where players were charged long after they had lost possession of the ball, and he agreed that stricter control was necessary”. Mr. W Mincham said that the Referees Association was also keen to assist in suppressing late tackling “which was a menace to the game”.
- Akarana Rugby League Football Club Akarana complained at the May 21 Junior Management meeting that City Rovers had “acquired four of its third grade players for the reserve seniors without due notice, with the result that Akarana was compelled to play its team short in the grade”. Mr. Stonex said that the matter would be brought before the senior board. At the July 30 junior management meeting they notified the league that they were claiming a £1 transfer fee “in respect of Donovan, acquired by City Rovers for its reserve team”. Akarana was found to have fielded two overweight players in their 5th grade match with Ellerslie and the result was reversed with Ellerslie awarded the win.
- Avondale League Football Club held a social at the Oddfellows’ Hall in Avondale in March. There was a large attendance with Mr. A. Stanley (chairman of the rugby league primary schools’ committee) presiding.
- City Rovers held their annual meeting on March 24 at 10:30am. There were 100 members in attendance with Mr. W.J. Davidson presiding. It was said that the club had a healthy credit balance. It was decided that they would have an improved jersey design. The officers were elected as follows: patron, Mr. R.B. Ashby; president, Mr. J.E. Parker; club captain, Mr. B. Davidson; secretary and treasurer, Mr. E.K. Asher; auditor, Mr. E.J. Phelan; vice-presidents, same as last year with power to add; committee, Messrs. J. Sullivan, O. Miller, R. Turner, W. Syms, J.H. Gallagher, S. Dickie, W. McLean, S Watene, J Counihan, and W Drew. The City club applied for use of Carlaw Park #2 for night training during the season. The City senior A and reserve grade sides played trial matches against Marist Old Boys at Carlaw Park on April 19. City were wearing new jerseys and they clashed with the red, white and blue of Ellerslie. It was suggested that “for their juniors against Ellerslie, City should revert to their old red and black jerseys”. The junior management committee compared jerseys and at their June 18 meeting decided that “the colours of the City Rovers’ new jerseys were out of order for juniors, particularly against Ellerslie”. City protested the result of their reserve grade match with Ponsonby after the referee awarded City a try and then altered his decision and disallowed it. Ponsonby won the match 5–3, and it was decided by the ARL Board to ask the Referees’ Association for a “report on the matter”. City was granted permission on July 3 to play a match at Whangarei a week later. Ernie Asher was appointed their manager for the trip.
- Devonport United applied for a match to be held on the North Shore and this was agreed by the league. The match was to involve Devonport and Mt Albert senor teams. Devonport were granted permission to play a match at Whangarei on July 20. They held their annual dance at the Masonic Hall in Devonport on August 21. The tables were decorated in steamers of the club colours, black and white.
- Ellerslie United League Football Club held their annual meeting on March 22 with Mr. J. McInnarney presiding. During it Mr. J Ryan was elected a life member. The following were elected officers: patron, Mr. W.J. Jordan, M.P.; president, Mr.J. McInnarney; vice-presidents, Messrs R. McIsaac, M.J. Barn, J. Walters, C. Clarke, S. Pemberton; club captain, Mr. F. Chapman; hon auditors Messrs O.D. Slye and J. Carr; hon secretary and treasurer, Mr. G. Whaley; executive committee, Messrs O.D. Slye (chairman), J Pinches, G. Skeen, G. Chapman, A Appleton, J Beere, R. Hunter, T. Emery, A. Tobin, and C. Edgar. Ellerslie protested a fifth grade match with Akarana, believing two of the Akarana players to be over weight. This was confirmed and Ellerslie was awarded the match.
- Glenora Rugby League Football Club held their annual meeting at the R.S.A. rooms in Glen Eden before a large attendance. Mr. Wilfred McNeil presiding, with Messrs. A. Hopkinson, George Taylor, and I. Stonex representing the junior management. The annual report showed a “considerable increase in support for the club in the district last season, and expressed confidence for the future”. The following officers were elected; patron, Mr. A.J. Routley; vice-patrons, Messrs. Frank Newton, sen., Chas. Robertson; president, Mr. George Bond; chairman, Mr. J. Elshaw; treasurer, Mr. S. Pearson; secretary, Mr. M.E. McNamara. A request came in from the Glen Eden district for a senior match to be played there during the season. There were complaints regarding the similarity of club colours between Glenora and Otahuhu. It was ruled that “teams must only play in registered club colours” with the Otahuhu club agreeing to “utilise white facings when opposed to Glenora”. Glen Eden had requested a senior match be played there and on 13 July the Ponsonby v Newton match was played there making it the first ever senior match of rugby league played in Glen Eden.
- Green Lane Rugby League Club were formed in early June with junior management committee member Mr. D. Wilkie presiding. He reported that “the prospects were good for a very strong district unit in the game. They nominated three teams in the third, fourth and sixth grades which were all accepted at the junior management meeting on May 28, and were also looking to form a senior B grade team as well. At the Board of Control meeting on June 5 Mr. D. Wilkie reported that in addition to the three new junior teams, they had also formed 2 new school thirteens, and a seven-a-side team which all led the start of the club. In late June Green Lane had their club colours of emerald green, black, and white approved.
- Manukau Rugby League Club held their annual meeting at Kelvin Hall in Onehunga on March 18 at 8pm. The Manukau club asked for an early senor fixture at Onehunga and this was approved by the league. A suitable date with an alternative was submitted by the club at the May 8 Board of Control meeting. The entire Manukau A 3rd grade team was suspended on June 25 after misconduct on two successive Saturdays. In June the Onehunga Sports Federation thanked the ARL “board for a donation of £10 towards the development of its grounds scheme in the Manukau district”. G. Carroll of the Manukau A third grade side occurred in late June and was held over pending the result of a Manukau Club transfer. At the July 16 junior management meeting the Manukau 3rd grade team had their disqualification uplifted with the exception of 3 players. The club was also notified that “the team coach was not deemed a suitable person t have charge of a team.
- Marist Brothers Old Boys League Football Club held their annual meeting at the Auckland Rugby League rooms in Grey's Buildings on March 20, at 7:45pm. The president Mr. J. Sayegh spoke about the season prior and “pleasure was expressed at the restoration to health of Mr. C. Gregory, the senior coach, who had met with a serious accident during the recess”. The club had a credit balance of £170. Officers elected were: patron, Rev. Dr. Liston, Bishop of Auckland; president, Mr. J. Sayegh; treasurer, Mr. E. J. Foster; club captain, Mr. H. Brisbane; delegate junior management, Mr. M. Thompson; auditors, Messrs. P. Fletcher and H Donovan; executive, Messrs. J. Ball, D. Mulavey, J Chalmers, W. Glover, G Batchelor, F Webberley and J Flynn. The Marist Old Boys senior A and reserve grade sides played trial matches against City Rovers at Carlaw Park on April 19.
- Māngere United League Football Club The Māngere senior B grade players were regraded to second grade, subject to their names being supplied. This decision was made at the junior management meeting on August 6.
- Mount Albert United Rugby League Football Club prior to the commencement of the season applied to the Auckland Rugby League to be admitted into the senior grade competition. They held their annual meeting at King George Hall, Mount Albert Terminus on March 18 at 8pm. Mt Albert submitted a request at the 19 June ARL Board of Control meeting from the Taradale senior team from Hawke's Bay who wished to play a match in Auckland. Mt Albert offered to accommodate the visitors during their time in Auckland and to entertain them. On July 10 Mt Albert was advised that they would be unable to play Taradale at Carlaw Park due to the upcoming visit of the Australian team. It was reported that Mt Albert hoped to play Taradale in Hawke's Bay later in the season. Mt Albert was granted permission for its senior team to play at Taupiri on July 6 with Mr. J. Johnson to manage the team. The July 3 ARL meeting discussed the issue of securing permanent dressing room accommodation for the Mt Albert club at Carlaw Park, with the matter being left in the hands of Chairman Campbell. At the August 7 Board of Control meeting Mr. J. Johnson as part of a Mt Albert deputation asked if the players from their senior side selected to play in the A and B trial as curtain-raiser to the inter-island match could be released from the fixture to travel with Mt Albert to play Taradale in Hawke's Bay. Chairman Campbell said that it wouldn't be possible as the trial match was to assist the selectors in selecting the New Zealand team to play against Australia. Mr Johnson said that their trip to Hawke's Bay would likely now have to be called off. Mt Albert did eventually decide to travel to Hawkes Bay to play the Taradale club side and advised the league that their secretary Mr. W. G. Shaw would manage the team's visit.
- Newton Rangers Football Club held their annual meeting at the Y.M.C.A on March 13 at 7:30pm. Mr. E.W. Cloke was noted as being actively involved in the Newton club as secretary by the Auckland Rugby League at their March 27 Board of Control meeting. On May 16 Newton held a meeting at the Y.M.C.A with George Steven presiding in the absence of Mr. Roy Baddeley who was unwell. The Rangers extended its social committee to form a supporters club with Mr. Steven appointed chairman, and Mrs. G. Matthews secretary. A membership card in the club colours was issued with details of the supporters club policy to be laid down at a general meeting later. On 19 June Newton travelled to Whangarei with their manager Mr. J. Rutledge to play a match against the local side.
- Northcote and Birkenhead Ramblers League Football Club In early July the Northcote club informed the junior management committee that during their drawn third grade game with Richmond the “linesman put up his flag but later informed the referee that a try was scored”. The matted was then referred to the Referees’ Association. At the junior management meeting on July 16 “Northcote Ramblers” applied for a senior fixture to be played at their ‘home ground’ at Stafford Park. The request was referred to the senior board. On August 1, Northcote held a dance at the Kings Theatre in Northcote to celebrate their twenty-fifth anniversary. The club colours of black and gold, “adorned the supper tables”.
- Otahuhu Rugby League Football Club stated at their annual meeting that the balance-sheet revealed a “healthy position” with “bright prospects for the coming season”. They presented caps to C. Kelly and F. Philp who were chosen as the “most conscientious players” for 1934. The following members were elected as follows: patron, Mr. W.W. Massey, M.P; president, Mr. J. Nicholson; vice-presidents, Dr. Eric Roy Lange (David Lange's father), Messrs. T. Clements, D. Jones, W. Lockhart, A. Whye, A. Brown, C. Nicolson, W. Allen, Bennett, Conn and W. Bright; chairman, Mr. R. Brennan; hon secretary, Mr. W. Arnold; hon treasurer, Mr. W. Bright. The Otahuhu club wrote to the ARL in mid May that their secretary Mr. L.W. Arnold had resigned, and Mr. M. Ritchie had been appointed. On June 1 the Otahuhu Borough Council “gave assurance that in the allocation of grounds there to sport bodies, rugby league would be given proper consideration. Otahuhu nominated itself for the Roope Rooster knockout competition at the July 10 ARL Board meeting after they had won the Senior B competition.
- Papakura Rugby League Football Club Former Papakura players Mortimer Stephens and Cyril Blacklaws (who had both transferred to Newton Rangers) were signed by St Helens. Their annual meeting was held on March 19 with Mr. S.H. Godden presiding over an attendance of 45 members. They noted that they had entered 5 teams in 1934 with about 70 players in 1933, increasing to 100 in 1934. Their balance sheet showed a credit of about £9. The Artcheson Medal for the most improved player from the fourth grade team of 1934 was awarded to R. Aukett. The following officers were elected; patron, Mr. E.C. Foote; president, Mr. S.H. Godden; vice-presidents, Messrs, Les McVeigh, C.C. Chamberlain, C.N. Spencer, H.A. Pollock, and B Lanigan; club captain, Mr Wm. Cornthwaite; treasurer, Mr Ron Walsh; social committee, Messrs, E. Ashby, I.R. Wilson, W. Elliott, J.H. McInnes, H. Hawley, and Ray Richardson; grounds committee, Messrs A. Hill, W. Martin, A McVeigh, and C. Whelan; hon doctors, Dr. G.W. Lock, and Dr. H. Burrell; auditor, Mr. I.R. Wilson. The first scheduled practice was scheduled for March 30. The club membership fee was fixed at 5s with 2s of this being paid to the Auckland Rugby League. At the Papakura Town Board meeting on March 26 they received a letter from the Papakura Club asking for permission to play on Prince Edward Park this season. The rent amount “was referred to the finance committee to investigate, together with a proposal to charge 1/ admission on four days during the season. On April 8 at the town board meeting it was decided to fix the ground rental at £5. The town board was also to build a fence on the western side of the playing area “in order to keep back spectators”. The club claimed a transfer fee from the move of Roy Johnstone to the Newton seniors the previous season and the junior management committee approved the claim at their May 28 meeting. Papakura planned a trip to Whangarei at the end of the season with most of the funds required contributed by their supporters. Ivan Wilson, who had been playing for Mt Albert, was fare-welled at a function at Papakura where he had been a club player for 5 years. He was moving to Wellington due to a work transfer. Papakura held their annual concert on October 10 with about 70 club members in attendance.
- Point Chevalier League Football Club At the July 31 board of control meeting Point Chevalier sent a deputation consisting of Messrs. Irwin (James) Hing (chairman and coach - who had previously played for Marist, Ponsonby and later Richmond), and J. Blackler, committee member. They asked for a senior match to be played in the district in connection with the queen carnival they were holding to help raise money for the building of a training shed and clubhouse for the Point Chevalier club. It was reported that the plans were already being well received. Chairman Campbell “urged the club to make an effort to obtain a well-lighted ground rather than confine training to a shed”. It was decided by the board to look on their request “favourably” and do what it could to help the club and district. They held their ‘benefit’ ball at the Dixieland in Point Chevalier on August 26. The function was conducted in the form of an ‘old-time’ dance and was under the auspices of the Holtonian dance management. Nine hundred people attended and “danced to the music of Holt's popular orchestra”.
- Ponsonby United Football Club held their annual meeting at Leys Institute on March 11 at 7:30pm. During the meeting they produced their 25th annual report in which they noted that they had done well winning 7 games with a “young and clever first thirteen”. Mr Longbottom had been the selector and Frank Delgrosso the coach. Mention was made of the passing during the off-season of former player Arthur Carlaw, who had died in November, 1934. Mr. E. C. McEwan was also thanked for his decoration of the club's room at Carlaw Park. He was also the appointed electrician at Carlaw Park and was heavily involved in the installation of the electric lights there the previous season. The following officers were elected: patron, Mr A.H. McKeown; president, Mr. H. Philburn; hon. secretary, Mr. E.C. McEwan; committee, Messrs, A. McIntyre, N.D. Culpan, B Anderson, N. Bass, and A. Lane; auditors, Messrs Ivan Culpan and A.F. Knowling; club captain, Victor Fagan; vice-presidents were re-elected. Lou Hutt was appointed player-coach of the senior team replacing Frank Delgrosso. It was reported later in March that N. Bass and W. Murray (selector) were unable to accept office, and Messrs. C. Raynes, C. Brown and W.J. Hindman had been elected to the club committee. Ponsonby applied for use of Carlaw Park #2 for night training during the season. The club later informed the league that its president, Mr. S. McDonald was transferred to Wellington and Mr. C.J.W. Taylor had been elected president. In June the Ponsonby club advised the ARL that Mr. D. Lane had succeeded Mr. A.S. McIntyre as their reserve grade coach. They also said that when the senior colour change was approved that it would also apply to the junior teams as well. The ARL asked the club to make special provisions. In early July the Ponsonby club informed the junior management committee that it had appointed Mr. J.C. Lumsden as their junior delegate with Mr. D. Lane the vice-delegate. At the July 3 ARL meeting Ponsonby complained that the “lighting facilities at Victoria Park were inadequate for training purposes and were dangerous. It was suggested that two additional floodlights on the pavilion and one immediately opposite on the other side of the ground, were necessary”. The board decided to approach the City Council regarding the issue. On August 17 Ponsonby 3rd grade defeated Taranaki Juniors 25 to 5 in New Plymouth.
- Richmond Rovers Football Club At an ARL Board of Control meeting on March 6 the Richmond club recommended that a sole Auckland selector be appointed for the season (as opposed to the usual 3). Richmond were granted permission by Auckland Rugby League to travel to Huntly on June 8 to play there. At the July 2 junior management meeting the decision by the senior board to make Richmond pay H. Divers transfer fee (after they acquired him in 1934) was supported. In July Richmond arranged a trip to Wellington for its bye round to play a match in the newly resurrected Wellington rugby league. The team to tour was: Bert Cooke (captain), E. McNeil, E.T. Mincham, A. Mitchell, J. Young, E Fletcher, N. Bickerton, R. Powell, H Tetley, Cliff Satherley, Ray Lawless, A. Broadhead, J Satherley, W. Telford, C. Verrall (two to be omitted). Richmond was awarded the E.B. Bennett Cup for the best-dressed team, with Green Lane second and Marist third.
- Tamaki Maori Rugby League Club advised the Board of Control at their May 22 meeting that the following had been elected officers for the season: hon. secretary and treasurer, Mr. W. N. Panapa; chairman, Mr. Stan Rickards; committee, Messrs. J. Wilson (senior), Ernie Asher, N. Reweti, W. Parora, G. Matthews, T. Kirkwood, H. Ngapera, K. Wera, J. Wilson (junior), and J. Pae; selectors, Messrs. Asher, Wera, and J. Wilson (senior).
- Waiuku Rugby League Club entered a team in the newly created Senior B competition. In July 1934 they had held a meeting and decided to form a sub-league in Waiuku and to affiliate with the Auckland league. The following committee was elected: Messrs L, Neuth. A. Healey, D. Coe, P. Tong, B. Flavell, H. Murray, and L. Wassell (secretary). At that time they had hoped to secure the services of a coach from Auckland. They received several donations of trophies, including a cup from Mr. S.C. Sycamore. In mid May, 1935 they advised the Junior Management meeting that it had the use of Massey Park, and the charge of the domain board for the ground was sent to the control board for approval. At the junior management meeting on June 18 Waiuku had their nomination for a fifth grade team accepted for the knock-out competition. Their club secretary Mr. W. Gordon said “that much interest was being taken in the code in the district”.

=== Senior grade registrations and transfers ===
Wilf Hassan transferred from Marist Old Boys to Mt Albert United on May 1 after his suspension had been uplifted, as did P. Walder. J.J. Magee and J. Miller transferred from Glenora to City Rovers, Lyle Rogers from Glenora to Ponsonby United, H. Lunn moved from Ponsonby United to Newton Rangers, P. Young from Richmond Rovers to Newton Rangers, J. Molehouse transferred from Pt Chevalier to Newton Rangers, Tony Milicich from Richmond Rovers to Devonport United, C. Thomas Ponsonby United to Pt Chevalier subject to a regrade, while the same applied to H Neale who was transferring from Ponsonby United to Papakura. Len Barchard was cleared for transfer from Devonport to Marist on April 25. The following players at the same meeting were registered as senior players: Carl Spiro, Richard Seddon Shadbolt, and Robert Esmond Morrissey (Mt Albert), F. Hulme (Newton), and D.A. McGee (Devonport). On May 1 the following senior players were registered: George William Surtees (Parnell), Roy Nightingale, D Stewart, and A. Matthews (Mt Albert), Lou Brown, D Hira, Pat Nathan, and Tai Nathan (City), E Smith and A Dufty (Newton), and J.C. Cowan (Devonport).

J. Speight, C. Watt, Charles Albert McNeil, and S.J. Bennett had their reinstatement approved at the May 8 Board of Control meeting. At the same meeting there were several registrations; E. Brown, N. McCarthy and J.F. Taylor (Ponsonby); C Tryon and L.J. Scott (Devonport); F. Blyth and L. Martinovich (Mt Albert); and L.R. Davis (Richmond). At the Board of Control meeting on May 15 Bert Leatherbarrow was granted a transfer from Devonport to Ponsonby (he was residing in Waitoa at the time but returning to Auckland). The following players were registered; Ross Nathan (City to Newton), W.S. Cooke (Mt Eden to City), Ronald J. Couper (Herne Bay to Richmond), and E. Gallagher (Mt Eden to Mt Albert).

On May 22 the following players were reinstated: L.J. Edkins, L.J. Smith, P. Kennedy, J. Speight, and Bert Leatherbarrow's transfer from Devonport to Ponsonby being made official. The following players were registered: J.E. Everett (Devonport), S.F. Thorpe (Ellerslie to Devonport), and B.D. Connolly (Grey Lynn to Marist). At the May 29 meeting the following players were registered: H.V. Hogg (Taranaki to Ponsonby), George A. Kerr (North Auckland to Newton), J.C. Martin (Mt Eden to Newton), G.W. Ratcliffe (Mt Eden to Richmond), and Phil D. Martin (City to Mt Albert). On June 5 the following senior players were registered or transferred: E.W. Coyle and W. Murray (Ponsonby), Sydney Hookway (Pt Chevalier), Victor Norris and Ernest Tier (Devonport), James A. Dye (City), and Don Cleverley (Mt Albert). On June 12 A. Bright of Newton was cleared for transfer to Pt Chevalier. The following players were registered: A. Wicks (Mt Eden), J Leonard (City to Devonport), A.A. Marinovich (Oratia to Devonport), O. McAdam (Mt Eden to Mt Albert).

On June 19 Harold M. Hill was registered with the Ponsonby club after moving from South Auckland (Waikato). R.S. Simpson registered with Mt Albert, while Tim Peckham was registered with City. On June 26 H.W. Collins and W.F. Ford were registered for City Rovers, C. Pierce with Devonport, and P Awhitu to Newton.

On July 10 R. McGreal transferred from Marist to Ngaruawahia, while City Rovers reported having registered J.T. Hapi, the ex-Hawke's Bay rugby union representative wing three quarter.

On July 17 C. Stephens (Akarana) transferred to Devonport, as did O. Donaldson of City. G. Ellis of Mt Albert transferred to Newton, while J. Pirihi also transferred to Newton. H.T. Irvine was reinstated from Marist rugby club to Mt Albert, at the July 24 ARL meeting, While W.M. Charlesworth of Paeroa was registered with Mt Albert.

On July 31 W. Carroll, an ex-South Auckland rugby union representative was registered with the Marist Old Boys. On August 7 Leo Cooney, an ex-North Auckland rugby union rep and All Black triallist was registered with the City Rovers. On August 14 John Tawhai, formerly of Auckland Grammar School was registered with the City Rovers. Reginald Dick and R Grant were registered with the Newton club, B.W. Johnston was registered with Ponsonby, and J.C. Burgess with the Marist club on August 28.
