= 1936 New Zealand rugby league season =

Seasons
- 1935 1937

The 1936 New Zealand rugby league season was the 29th season of rugby league that had been played in New Zealand.

== International competitions ==
New Zealand lost two Test matches against Great Britain. New Zealand included; Jack Hemi, Len Scott, George Tittleton, Tommy Trevarthan, Lou Brown, Arthur Kay, Roy Powell, Bill McNeight, Billy Glynn, Jim Calder, Joe Cootes, Frank Pickrang, Puti Tipene (Steve) Watene (c), Claude Dempsey and Ted Mincham.

Great Britain opened the tour by defeating Auckland 22–16 at Carlaw Park. Auckland included; Claude Dempsey, R.Bright, Wally Tittleton, captain Lou Brown, W.Stockley, Arthur Kay, Roy Powell, Angus Gault, Jack Satherley, Bill Breed, Puti Tipene (Steve) Watene, Frank Pickrang and Harold Tetley.

The South Island lost to Great Britain 17–3 at the Show Grounds. South Island included Ces Davison, Bill McNeight, Reg Ward, Billy Glynn and Jim Calder. Jim Amos was the selector and manager.

== National competitions ==
=== Northern Union Cup ===
West Coast held the Northern Union Cup at the end of the season, after they defeated Canterbury 21–13 at English Park. This was the West Coast's first win in Christchurch.

Canterbury included Reg Ward and Ces Davison.

=== Inter-district competition ===
Auckland played Wellington on King's Birthday weekend. Auckland were coached by Bert Cooke and included John Anderson, captain Harold Tetley, Lou Hutt, Wally Tittleton, Claude Dempsey, Arthur Kay, Brian Riley, Ted Mincham and Roy Powell.

== Club competitions ==
=== Auckland ===
Manukau won the Auckland Rugby League's Fox Memorial Trophy. It was Manukau's first season back in the competition and they also won the Roope Rooster knockout.

Richmond won the Stormont Shield, Papakura won the Sharman Cup and Mount Albert won the Norton Cup.

Puti Tipene (Steve) Watene played for Manukau, after being one of the driving forces behind the clubs admittance into the Auckland Rugby League's first division. Other players included Jack Hemi (from the Wairarapa), Jack Brodrick (also from the Wairarapa), Angus Gault (from Waitomo), Tommy Trevarthan (from the Otago Rugby Union), Rangi and Tom Chase (from Taihape) and Frank Pickrang (from the King Country). The team was largely made up of Māori players, a result of Watene's scouting trip to North Island Māori settlements in off-season.

Marist included Alan Clarke, Ted Brimble played for Newton and Claude List played for Mount Albert.

=== Wellington ===
St George won the Wellington Rugby League's Appleton Shield.

=== Canterbury ===
Hornby won the Canterbury Rugby League's Massetti Cup.

Marist Greymouth drew 9-all with Hornby to retain the Thacker Shield for the West Coast Rugby League.
