= 1935 New Zealand rugby league season =

Seasons
- 1934 1936

The 1935 New Zealand rugby league season was the 28th season of rugby league that had been played in New Zealand.

== International competitions ==
New Zealand lost a series against Australia 1–2. New Zealand included first and second Test captain Bert Cooke, third Test captain Lou Brown, Ted Mincham, Wally Tittleton, Arthur Kay, Stan Prentice, Roy Powell, Harold Tetley, Cliff Satherley, Billy Glynn, Jim Laird, Lou Hutt, Jim Calder, Cliff Hunt, Herbert Lilburne, Reg Ward, Alf Mitchell, Brian Riley, Eric Fletcher, Ray Lawless and Jim Laird. This was only the second time the Kangaroos had toured New Zealand.

Australia defeated Auckland City 16-8 before 15,000 fans at Carlaw Park. They then defeated a New Zealand XIII 47-31 before winning 36–18 against Auckland Province. Auckland City included Bert Cooke, Lou Brown, Ted Mincham, C Hall, Arthur Kay, Stan Prentice, Roy Powell, Lou Hutt, W Quirke, Bill Telford, Cliff Satherley, Jim Laird and Harold Tetley. Auckland Province included Claude Dempsey, George Tittleton (South Auckland), Wally Tittleton (South Auckland), Kay, Alf Mitchell, Brian Riley, Eric Fletcher, Hutt, J Flanagan, Des Herring, Ray Lawless, Satherley and Tetley.

== National competitions ==
=== Northern Union Cup ===
Canterbury again held the Northern Union Cup at the end of the season. They defeated the West Coast 28–15 at Monica Park. Jim Amos captained Canterbury while the West Coast included Jim Calder and John Anderson. The next day Canterbury defeated Inangahua in a charity match.

=== Inter-district competition ===
Auckland toured the South Island defeating the West Coast 31–14 at Victoria Park and Canterbury 26–13 at Monica Park. The Northern Union Cup was not on the line however, due to Auckland not meeting a 30 June challenge deadline.

Wellington hosted Auckland at Newtown Park.

Canterbury included Reg Ward while Auckland included Bert Cooke, Des Herring and Lou Brown.

=== Māori ===
Tāmaki (Auckland) retained the Waitangi Shield, by defeating Tai Tokerau (Northland) 24–8 at Carlaw Park, Auckland.

== Club competitions ==
=== Auckland ===
Richmond won the Auckland Rugby League's Fox Memorial Trophy and the Stormont Shield. Newton won the Roope Rooster, Otahuhu won the Sharman Cup and Marist won the Norton Cup.

Mount Albert were awarded senior status for the first time.

Puti Tipene (Steve) Watene played for the City Rovers while Richmond included; Bert Cooke, Ted Mincham, Stan Prentice, Roy Powell, Cliff Satherley, Harold Tetley, Alf Mitchell, Eric Fletcher, Bill Telford and Ray Lawless.

=== Wellington ===
St George won the Wellington Rugby League's Appleton Shield.

=== Canterbury ===
Addington won the Canterbury Rugby League's Massetti Cup.

=== Other competitions ===
Blackball held the Thacker Shield and received no challenge for the trophy.
