= 1937 New Zealand rugby league season =

Seasons
- 1936 1938

The 1937 New Zealand rugby league season was the 30th season of rugby league that had been played in New Zealand.

== International competitions ==
New Zealand drew a series against Australia, 1-all. New Zealand included; first Test captain Puti Tipene (Steve) Watene, Ces Davison, Brian Riley, Rangi Chase, Wally Tittleton, Noel Bickerton, Frank Halloran, Angus Gault, Billy Glynn, Joe Cootes, second Test captain Harold Tetley, Jack Brodrick, Jack McLeod, George Nēpia, Arthur Kay and Jack Satherley.

The New Zealand Māori defeated Australia 16–5 at Carlaw Park. New Zealand Māori included George Nēpia, captain Puti Tipene (Steve) Watene, Jack Brodrick, Rangi and Tom Chase and Jack Hemi. Tongan-born George Mitchell became the first Polynesian to represent New Zealand Māori in the match.

Jack Redwood replaced Cyril Sneddon as the New Zealand Rugby League's chairman, serving until 1953.

== National competitions ==
=== Northern Union Cup ===
West Coast again held the Northern Union Cup at the end of the season. They defeated Canterbury 20–13 at Wingham Park to retain the trophy.

=== Inter-district competition ===
George Nēpia represented Canterbury in August when they defeated Inangahua 21–12 at Monica Park in front of 7,000 fans.

== Club competitions ==
=== Auckland ===
Richmond won the Auckland Rugby League's Fox Memorial Trophy. The Marist Brothers won the Roope Rooster and Stormont Shields, the Papakura club won the Sharman Cup and Richmond won the Norton Cup.

Verdun Scott became the only player to play at both Carlaw Park and Eden Park on the same day when he appeared for North Shore in a club game before heading to Eden Park to play cricket.

George Nēpia joined Puti Tipene (Steve) Watene at Manukau. Other players included Jack Hemi, Jack Brodrick, Angus Gault, Tommy Trevarthan, Rangi and Tom Chase and Frank Pickrang.

John Anderson, who had joined from Blackball, captained Marist. George and Wally Tittleton played for Richmond.

=== Wellington ===
Petone won the Wellington Rugby League's Appleton Shield.

=== Canterbury ===
Addington won the Canterbury Rugby League's Massetti Cup.

George Nēpia played for Hornby against Addington at Monica Park on 31 July, scoring two goals. Reg Ward played for Addington.

=== Other Competitions ===
Addington defeated Blackball 15–11 to win the Thacker Shield.
