= 1934 New Zealand rugby league season =

Seasons
- ← 1933 1935 →

The 1934 New Zealand rugby league season was the 27th season of rugby league that had been played in New Zealand.

== International competitions ==
New Zealand did not play in any matches during the 1934 season.

The New South Wales Rugby League's champions, the Western Suburbs Magpies, traveled the New Zealand and lost two matches against the Auckland Rugby League's champion Richmond Bulldogs, 18–16 and 10–3, at Carlaw Park.

The Māori Rugby League Board of Control, was formed in 1934 to administer the game in Māori communities. King Koroki was the first patron.

== National competitions ==
=== Northern Union Cup ===
Canterbury held the Northern Union Cup at the end of the season, after they defeated West Coast Rugby League 22–15 at Victoria Park, Greymouth on 18 August. Jim Amos captained the Canterbury side and scored a try as well as several goals. Canterbury also included Reg Ward while Jim Calder and Billy Glynn played for West Coast.

== Club competitions ==
=== Auckland ===
Richmond won the Auckland Rugby League's Fox Memorial Trophy, Roope Rooster, Stormont Shield and Norton Cup. This was the first time a club had captured the Fox, Rooster and Stormont treble.

Puti Tipene (Steve) Watene played for the City Rovers while Richmond included Harold Tetley, Ted Mincham, Cliff Satherley, Bill Telford and Clarry McNeil.

=== Wellington ===
St George won the Wellington Rugby League's Appleton Shield.

=== Canterbury ===
Hornby won the Canterbury Rugby League's Massetti Cup.

Ruru gained senior status, however only retained it for two seasons.
