= Wally Tittleton =

NZ international rugby league & union player (1914–1988)

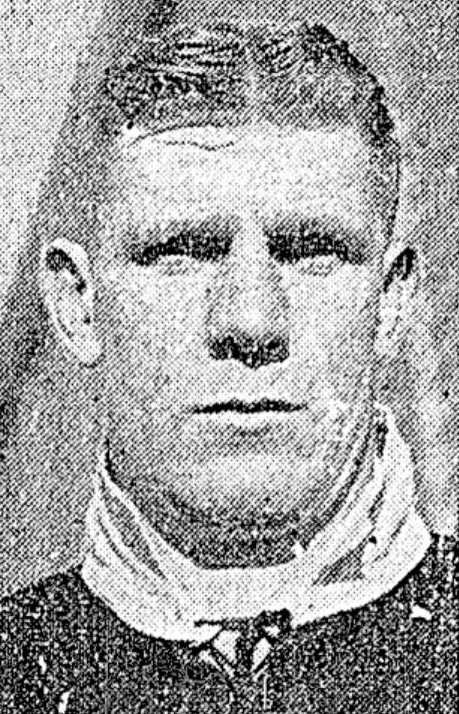

Personal information
- Full name: Walter Harry Tittleton
- Born: 4 February 1914 Huntly, Waikato, New Zealand
- Died: 1988 (aged 73–74) Huntly, Waikato, New Zealand

Playing information

Rugby league
- Position: Centre
Club
| Years | Team | Pld | T | G | FG | P |
|---|---|---|---|---|---|---|
| 1930–33 | Ngāruawāhia | 38 | 2 | 0 | 0 | 6 |
| 1934–35 | Taupiri | 20 | 5 | 0 | 0 | 15 |
| 1936–43 | Richmond Rovers | 118 | 42 | 0 | 0 | 126 |
| 1945 | Ponsonby United | 2 | 0 | 0 | 0 | 0 |
| | Total | 178 | 49 | 0 | 0 | 147 |
Representative
| Years | Team | Pld | T | G | FG | P |
| 1931–35 | South Auckland (Waikato) | 13 | 0 | 1 | 0 | 2 |
| 1932 | Lower Waikato | 1 | 0 | 0 | 0 | 0 |
| 1934–39 | North Island | 5 | 3 | 0 | 0 | 9 |
| 1935–39 | New Zealand | 15 | 4 | 0 | 0 | 12 |
| 1935 | Auckland Province | 1 | 0 | 0 | 0 | 0 |
| 1936–41 | Auckland | 7 | 2 | 0 | 0 | 6 |
| 1937–41 | Auckland Pākehā | 2 | 1 | 0 | 0 | 3 |

Rugby union
Club
| Years | Team | Pld | T | G | FG | P |
|---|---|---|---|---|---|---|
| 1942 | Motor Transport Pool (M.T.P.) | 17 | 2 | 0 | 0 | 6 |
Representative
| Years | Team | Pld | T | G | FG | P |
| 1942 | Auckland Army | 1 | 0 | 0 | 0 | 0 |
- Relatives: George Tittleton (brother)

Wally Tittleton was a rugby league player who began his career playing in the Waikato of New Zealand. He represented South Auckland (Waikato) and made the New Zealand team before moving to Auckland in 1936 and joining the Richmond Rovers club. Prior to that he had played for the Ngāruawāhia and Taupiri clubs in the Waikato. While in Auckland he made the Auckland team and played for them 7 times. He also played for Auckland Pākehā, and the North Island on several occasions. In total Tittleton played for New Zealand 15 times and when he debuted in 1935 he became Kiwi No. 241. In 1942 he joined the Motor Transport Pool rugby union team which won the Gallaher Shield before rejoining the rugby league code in 1943.

== Early life ==
Wally (Walter) Harry Tittleton was born on February 4, 1914, in Huntly, Waikato, New Zealand. His father was John Edward Tittleton (1884–1953), and his mother Mary Eliza Rayner (1890–1936). He had an older brother, George (1909–1984) who also represented New Zealand at rugby league, and another old brother, William who also played senior rugby league with Wally and George. They had two other siblings but they both died as infants in 1920, and 1924. The family spent their youth in the lower Waikato and lived and played sport in the Huntly, Ngaruawahia, and Taupiri areas. In 1923 Wally won a second place prize at the Waikato Winter Show in May for freehand drawing when he would have been aged 9.

== Playing career ==
=== Waikato rugby league ===
==== Ngāruawāhia and South Auckland representative ====
The first likely mention of Wally Tittleton on a rugby league field was in September, 1927 when a Ngāruawāhia junior team lost 5–6 to a Huntly side. Tittleton kicked a conversion for the losers. It was said that "Dwen and Tittleton (backs)…" were about the pick of the losers. In the early stages of Wally's career his brother William was also playing and at times the newspapers failed to distinguish between the two. On May 10, 1930, aged 16, Wally played along with George in the Ngāruawāhia senior side against Huntly B. They won 14 to 3. He reportedly "put in a good afternoon's work with credit" along with other new players H. Hill and Williams. Near the end of the season, in September, he was regraded, presumably from juniors to seniors.

The 1931 season was to be Wally's first full season in senior grade. Both George and William had been granted transfers to the Taupiri rugby league club, leaving Wally to continue at Ngāruawāhia. His first match of the season was for Ngāruawāhia at home against Huntly on May 20 with Tittleton playing second five eighth with Ngaruawahi winning 11–8. He played against Kia Ora the following week before a further match with Hamilton on June 6. Ngāruawāhia won 20–2 with the Waikato Times reporting that "Tittleton and Hall at five eighths both played well… Tittleton cut through on several occasions and took some watching".

Tittleton played 6 more matches, including one against the Devonport United (North Shore Albions) side from Auckland on July 16 before being selected in a South Auckland representative trial match on July 25. Wally played at five eighth for the Possibles side with his brother William in the forward, while George played on the wing for the Probables side. The Probables side won easily 31–11, with Wally scoring an early try for the losers. Wally then played 3 further matches for Ngāruawāhia which concluded with them winning the competition following an 8–5 win over Taupiri on August 15.

Tittleton was then chosen to make his debut for South Auckland on August 22 against Northland. The South Auckland side was in fact an upper Waikato side but was named South Auckland in its early decades. He was selected in the second five eighth position with George on the wing. New Zealand representative, Edwin Abbott was playing at halfback. The match was played at Carlaw Park in Auckland so that entry could be charged and money made towards growing the game in the two provinces. South Auckland won by 16 points to 8. Tittleton was involved in some attacking play and was forced out in the corner with Scott scoring in the corner from the resulting scrum. It was reported that Wally kicked a first half penalty and later missed a conversion. This was possibly incorrect as he did virtually no goal kicking in his entire career and his brother George, who was playing on the wing was much more well known as a regular goal kicker. Walter failed to gain selection for the Lower Waikato representative side to play the touring Marist Old Boys club from Auckland on August 29, with George in the backs and William a forward reserve.

He then played 4 matches for Ngāruawāhia against Hamilton, Huntly, Marathon, and Huntly again. In the last of the matches against Huntly for the Draffin Cup on October 3 he scored a try near the posts in their 14–7 loss. The Huntly Press and District Gazette newspaper said that he was one of the "most prominent" for Ngaruawahia. Following the conclusion of the club season Tittleton was picked to play in a South Auckland trial match between A and B teams. The match was being played to help choose the representative side to play the touring Eastern Suburbs side from Sydney. It was played at Taupiri with Tittleton chosen in the five-eighths with Cotter of the Hamilton club in the A side. They won by 11 points to 0 and Tittleton was chosen in the South Auckland side for the match against Eastern Suburbs to be played at Steele Park in Hamilton on October 14. He was chosen to play in the centres, opposite Dave Brown. Eastern Suburbs won the match by 23 points to 14 before a crowd of 2,000. Tittleton was mentioned a couple of times in attacking movements but was said to have "tackled solidly".

The 1932 season saw Tittleton play around 10 matches for Ngāruawāhia and 5 representative matches. There was very little coverage of the club competition in the Waikato newspapers during the season with it main limited to stating fixture details and reporting the scores. His first match of the season was against Hamilton on April 30. Ngāruawāhia won 14–0 with Tittleton setting up their first try to Mason. He played in further matches against Taupiri, Huntly, Hamilton, and Taupiri again on May 28. His brother George was now playing in the Ngāruawāhia side and the two were involved in several scoring movements. The Huntly Express and District Gazette said that Walter "played a fine game" in Ngāruawāhia's 21–8 win before a large Ngāruawāhia crowd.

He was then selected in the South Auckland team to play against Northland on June 18 in the second five eighth position outside Kenneth Peckham. The match was played in Whangārei and saw South Auckland win 15 to 13. With the score 8 to 5 in favour of the Northland side Tittleton injured his shoulder and was replaced by Holland. In a speculative letter to the editor of the Waikato Times which was published on July 9 the writer said that "the "R. Tittleton" whom "Follower" speaks of as being a promising young player and W. Tittleton are one and the same man and unfortunately he will not be available for any more football this season". His injury was clearly not that serious and a Tittleton was mentioned as playing for Ngāruawāhia on July 2, then against Hamilton he was tried out at fullback in a 14–0 win. The Waikato Times said that he "acquitted himself well". He was then selected for the South Auckland side to play an Auckland XIII team on July 16 in the fullback position with George on the wing. The match was being played to help the New Zealand selectors chose the test team to play the touring England. The Auckland XIII won by 29 points to 13 at Carlaw Park. In the first half Len Scott, the New Zealand winger raced "round Tittleton to score behind the posts". With the score 13–2 at halftime the South Auckland back line was changed with Tittleton moving to five-eighths and Garry going back to fullback.

He then played in a South Auckland trial match on July 23 to help pick the South Auckland side to play England in a Possibles side at first five eighth. The Possibles won the match 20–8 and then Tittleton was surprisingly chosen to play on the wing for the representative side against England. It was not a position that he had been playing in. The Waikato Times said in a preview of the match that "W. Tittleton (centre) is a young player who has come into prominence lately". The England centre pairing was Atkinson and Dinsdale.

The match was played at Onslow Park in Taupiri on August 3 in showery weather with England winning easily by 64 points to 11 before around 2000 spectators. It was reported that "the best of the local rear guard were the Tittleton's, Abbott, and Smith". The Waikato Times said that "Smith and Abbott were the most prominent, which G. Tittleton and W. Tittleton gave some measure of support".

Tittleton then returned to play for Ngāruawāhia in matches against Huntly on August 13 and September 3. The second match was at the Huntly Recreation Ground and saw Huntly win the Draffin Cup 19 points to 12. Wally scored a rare try to this point in his career, though George missed the conversion. His next match was in a Northern Union Challenge Cup defense against Northland at Ngāruawāhia. Before a crowd of 5,000 the South Auckland side won 22–20. He then finished his season with another match for Ngāruawāhia against Huntly on September 17, and a representative game for Lower Waikato against Auckland on October 2.

The 1933 season was to be his last playing for the Ngāruawāhia club. He played in 11 matches for them and also represented South Auckland on 5 occasions. There was very little coverage of the Waikato club competition with player names barely mentioned in the entire season. On July 11 after 7 matches for Ngāruawāhia, Tittleton was named at centre in the South Auckland team to play Auckland at Carlaw Park for the Northern Union Challenge Cup which they were defending. The Auckland Star described him as "a first class centre, and only needs to play his usual style to draw attention". He was matched up against Claude List in the Auckland side at centre. The New Zealand Herald said that their backs are "a clever combination. G. and W. Tittleton, Timms and Stevenson are well known players". South Auckland won the match in atrocious conditions with the field covered in mud, and retained the trophy with a 14–0 win. Wally was involved in a try after he and R. Garry combined "together in a dashing passing move down inside touch" before his brother George "rushed up to be the extra man and he went over the line in a flash well out". The Auckland Star commented that Wally "showed speed and tenacity on defence".

In August Tittleton was named to play in the Ngāruawāhia side which was traveling to Taranaki to play the local club at Inglewood. Inglewood won the match 23 to 10. Then a week later South Auckland were defending the Northern Union Challenge Cup against West Coast in Huntly. In something of a surprise the visiting side won the match 8–6. Wally was involved in several attacking moves and both he and George "were seen in dangerous attempts at each corner" late in the match. After a match for Ngāruwāhia on August 26 Tittleton was selected again for South Auckland to play against Hawkes Bay on September 6. South Auckland won easily at Ngāruawāhia by 31 points to 6 with Wally involved in a try to H. Hill after combining with his brother George and Huatahi Paki. Tittleton was then chosen to play against Auckland on September 9 at Carlaw Park. Auckland won the match 17–5 with Tittleton involved in several attacking movement. The Auckland Star noted that "Walter Tittleton and Hill were magnificently consistent throughout". Just on halftime Wally was injured in a collision with New Zealand fullback Norm Campbell. His final game of the year was for South Auckland against the touring St. George Dragons side from Sydney which had recently finished runner up in the New South Wales championship. The match was played at Taupiri with the visitors winning 17 to 5. With the score at 9–0 to St. George, Tittleton "was prominent and beat all but [George] Ward, who tackled well". A while later he crossed the line but they were called back for a forward pass.

==== Move to Taupiri club and North Island selection ====
1934 saw Wally move to the Taupiri club where he joined George, and William, with their father John on the committee. He played 12 matches and scored 3 tries. He only played in one match for South Auckland in addition to a South Auckland trial match. However his year was most noticeable for his first ever match for the North Island representative side.

Through 6 games for Taupiri he had scored 2 tries, against his former club Ngāruawāhia on April 21, and again against them on June 2. Taupiri won the championship and then on June 4 they traveled to Jubilee Park in Inglewood, Taranaki to play against the Inglewood side. Both teams were leading their respective championships. All three Tittleton brothers were in the side. The match was said to be the best game of league in the area since the sport was reintroduced there and Taupiri won 26–18 before a crowd of 400. Wally scored a try and "gave some pointers in getting through in a hard position". Early in the match from a scrum he "showed the crowd a pretty piece of play by flashing through to score". Brothers William and George both scored a try each as well.

He played in further matches against Ngāruawāhia, Huntly, Ngāruawāhia against and then Huntly once more. The later match saw them win the Innes Memorial Shield for the championship. Taupiri won 3–0 with a late try to "Tittleton" though it was not said which of the brothers scored. Following another match for Taupiri against Tuakau he was selected in a South Auckland trial match to play for the Possibles against the Probables on August 15. After the match he was named to play in South Auckland's match with Northland on August 25. South Auckland won 13–5 with Tittleton involved in setting up all three of their tries. His form had been good enough to catch the attention of the North Island selectors and he was chosen to play at centre for them in their annual fixture against South Island on September 1.

The North Island won by 36 points to 18. With the South Island leading 10–0 early Tittleton became involved in their attack "taking up the running as becomes a thrustful centre". He received the ball from Bert Cooke and passed to Dick Smith who scored. The Auckland Star said that "the North three-quarters, with W. Tittleton, the star, in the middle played well". In the second half he "brilliantly cut through on the fly, and veering out to the right, timed a pass to G. Tittleton, who ran diagonally infield behind the posts". Then a while later Roy Powell sent the ball to Stan Prentice, and he "took the pass and swerved at top over the line". Towards the end of the game he "drew the defence and Prentice scored" again. The New Zealand Herald said after the match that "an impressive game was played by W. Tittleton, South Auckland, at centre. He was very clever and tricky on attack and frequently beat several tacklers, while his defence was sound". Tittleton was then selected to play for South Auckland against Auckland where he would be marking Bert Cooke, however he was unable to secure leave from work and therefore could not play in the match.

==== New Zealand selection ====
Tittleton made the New Zealand international team for the first time in 1935. The New Zealand Rugby League many years later had assumed that it was his brother George who had played in the test match but it was in fact Walter who made his debut, after George had played for New Zealand 5 years earlier in 1930. Walter began the season playing for Taupiri once more, and he made 8 appearances for them during the season, scoring 2 tries. He also played one match for South Auckland and played for the North Island again.

At Taupiri's annual meeting on March 22, their father, John E. Tittleton was elected as their club delegate to the South Auckland league. Taupiri played 2 matches against Ngāruawāhia (27 April, 18 May), and 2 against Huntly (18 May, 25 May). There was little scoring reported though Walter and George both scored tries for Taupiri in their 17–6 win on May 4. On May 23 Walter, his wife, and mother were inside a house in Taupiri which burnt to the ground. The home was owned by Mrs. G.E. Severne of New Lynn but was occupied by the Tittleton family. The father, John had been at Auckland Hospital where he was an ‘inmate’ at the time. It was reported that "the occupants had time only to dress and leave the house, in which everything was destroyed".

Tittleton played for Taupiri against the newly formed Pukemiro club on June 1, and then against Ngāruawāhia on June 8 where he scored another try in a 16–5 win. A week later Taupiri beat Huntly 17–11 to secure their third successive championship. Then on July 28 he played in a trial match in a combined Taupiri and Huntly side against a Ngāruawāhia and Pukemiro side. He was chosen in the centres with George on the wing. Following the match he was selected in the South Auckland side to play Auckland B on August 3. Auckland B won the game 17–9 at Carlaw Park. The New Zealand Herald said that "the best back on the ground was W. Tittleton, centre-three quarter for South Auckland. He made many nice openings, and ran straight in passing bouts". They also said that he kicked a conversion and two penalties though it was most likely in error, with George being the most experienced and prominent goal kicker for the South Auckland side. After a match for Taupiri against Huntly on August 10, Wally was chosen for the North Island side to play South Island on August 17 in the five-eighths with Stan Prentice. The North Island won the match 19 points to 18. He was involved in a try to Lou Brown which gave the North an 11–5 lead. Then later in the match after Roy Powell gained possession, he passed to Tittleton who sent it on to Bert Cooke who scored. The Auckland Star wrote that Cooke and Tittleton were the best backs on the ground and "Tittleton got through a great deal of honest work and with a bit more experience in good company would develop into a brilliant back".

After the inter-island match he was named at centre in the first test side to play Australia at Carlaw Park on September 28. New Zealand Rugby League assumed it was his brother George in their records but the newspapers clearly stated "W. Tittleton" and he was named in the centres where he was accustomed to playing, while George was almost exclusively a winger throughout his career. The Auckland Star wrote that "W. Tittleton, the Waikato man, has been playing consistently throughout the season, and can be relied on to give a good account of himself at centre". The New Zealand Herald wrote "the New Zealand backs, with Tittleton as centre three-quarter, should have speed on attack. Tittleton has frequently shown good form and is a fine attacking player". New Zealand won the test by 22 points to 14. Despite the heroics of the New Zealand side in their upset win Tittleton was dropped for the second test. The Herald said that "Tittleton did some good defensive work, but all round his showing was scarcely up to New Zealand standard".

Despite being dropped for the second test he was selected to play 2 weeks later for the Auckland Provincial team to play Australia on October 9. The Auckland Star wrote that the side would feature a "smart three quarter line, with Alf Mitchell on one flank and George Tittleton on the other. The latter has been playing well this year and if on his toes he should be seen to advantage. The centre will be his brother, W. Tittleton, who did so well in the first test". The Auckland Provincial side lost the match 36–18. Wally fumbled a pass early in the second half and "lost a try" with Auckland trailing 13–9.

=== Move to Auckland to join Richmond Rovers ===
In 1936 both Wally and George moved north to Auckland where they joined the Richmond Rovers rugby league club based in Grey Lynn. The Auckland Star wrote that "George Tittleton, who is to be given the responsibility of full back, and his brother Walter, a fine young five eighth, who will be associated with Eric Fletcher and Roy Powell behind the scrum. Their transfers were cleared on April 15. At around the same time their mother, Mary, had passed away after a long illness on April 6 at Waikato Hospital.

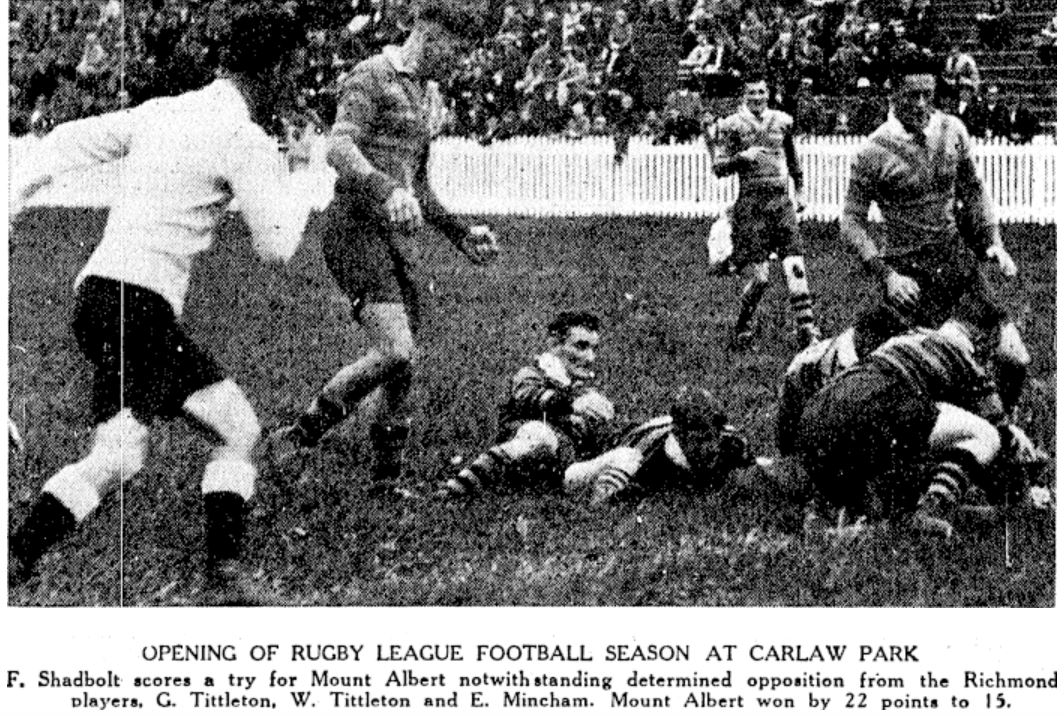
Wally Tittleton lying face down after trying to prevent a try to Shadbolt of Mt Albert. His brother George was on his back.

Both brothers were named to make their Richmond debuts in their practice match on April 18 at Carlaw Park against Mt Albert United. Mt Albert won 22–15, with the Auckland Star writing that both brothers "gave a good account of themselves" with Wally showing "pace and enterprise in the five eighth berth". He also scored a try for them. A photograph was published in the Herald of both brothers trying to prevent a try to Shadbolt in the Mt Albert side. The Herald also wrote prior to their first competition match that "the loss of A.E. Cooke is a severe one for Richmond… which, however, will field a strong thirteen. W. Tittleton the former South Auckland and New Zealand representative, is one of the most promising backs in the code and, at five eighths, he should improve the attack". They won 21–10 against Ponsonby United with Wally combining well with Ted Mincham. The New Zealand Herald said that he was "well to the fore in the first half when he was receiving opportunities, and there is little doubt that he is a most promising player" and would be "a decided acquisition". Their next match was against Manukau who would go on to win the championship, one point ahead of Richmond. Manukau won 14–8 with Wally scoring one of their two tries and was said to be the best Richmond back. In a 13–12 loss to Mt Albert he played first five-eighths where "he did some good all-round work". In their next match, a 23–13 win over Marist Old Boys, he "did a lot of useful work" and was involved in a try to Owen Wilkie. In their round 5 win over Newton Rangers he "cut through cleverly on occasions only to see his good work nullified by poor handling". He scored his third try in a 13–13 draw with Devonport United. Tittleton "was sound in all departments and when he cut through he was always working for position and studying his supports". The Herald said that "both Mincham and Tittleton played fine games and made brilliant openings which should have brought better results… Tittleton, besides being prominent both on attack and defence, scored a good solo try from a poor cross kick from Crooks". In a loss to City Rovers on June 13 he was "easily the best of the Richmond backs and was dangerous on attack". Then in a 15–6 win over Ponsonby he collaborated "in great fashion" with Noel Bickerton and played an "outstanding game".

==== Auckland debut ====
Tittleton's good form saw him selected for Auckland Pākehā to play Tāmaki (Auckland Māori) on June 23. It was said that "it must be encouraging to the Auckland selector to note the development of Tittleton, whose powerful running and sound tackling are assets". It was the first ever Auckland Pākehā side to take the field. An Auckland Māori side had played a few fixtures prior to this however. The Māori team won the match 30–22 at Carlaw Park. The Herald wrote that "Auckland's best backs were Powell, at half, and W. Tittleton, first five-eighths. Both did a lion's share of the work on attack and defence". He was involved in making a break from which John Anderson scored, and later he gathered a wild pass allowing Harold Tetley to score.

He then scored a try for Richmond in a 27–11 win over Manukau on June 27 where he "teamed well with" Noel Bickerton. They also noted that he "was at the top of his form and his strong running resulted in many splendid openings. He also did a lot of effective work on defence". He was selected by Bert Avery to go into training for Auckland with a view to prepare the squad players for the visit of the England side. His weight was reported to be 12 stone 4 lb's. It was suggested that he "should be assured" of a place in the final selection as he was "good on attack while very sound on defence". In an 11–11 draw with Mt Albert he was "lively" and always "studying his supports" and he along with Ted Mincham was "very dangerous in the first spell". Tittleton was selected at five-eighths along with E. Staples from Napier by Bert Avery in the North Island side for the annual inter-island match. The Herald opined that Tittleton "is one of the best all-round backs in the code and his place in the New Zealand side seems assured". The Auckland Star said that he "is playing wonderfully fine football and can be relied upon to give his supports every opportunity". The Herald also noted his good form and that he "has previously represented New Zealand". Before a crowd of 15,000 at Carlaw Park the North Island side won 21–16. Tittleton played well, especially in the second spell when "he was more in the picture… and got the ball on the move" after Staples had been moved to the wing at halftime after he had held on too much in the first half. The Herald said that he had "enhanced" his chances of New Zealand selection with his performance.

He was selected in the Auckland side to play England on July 25 in the outside centre position. The Herald put it simply that he "is a solid type of centre and has previously represented New Zealand". He was to be matched up with the famous English centre Gus Risman who played 791 club matches from 1929 to 1954 as well as 36 test matches for England, Wales, and Great Britain. Tittleton was paired with Roy Bright and Lou Brown in a "fast and experienced" three quarter line. Auckland went down by 22–16 before 14,000 spectators. The backs received little ball with England winning 40 of the 58 scrums but Tittleton was said to have "played soundly at centre". With England leading 17–11 Brown beat Alan Edwards, and then some reverse passing between Tittleton, Arthur Kay, and then Brown saw the latter cross for a try. Tittleton was "Auckland's best back. He tackled well, showed ability on attack and gave a sound all round display".

=== New Zealand selection ===
==== New Zealand v England (1936) ====
On August 1 he played for Richmond in a match with Newton Rangers and was a thorn in the opposition side along with Noel Bickerton in their 22–6 win. Tittleton was then selected by Thomas McClymont, Bert Avery, and Jim Amos to make his second appearance for New Zealand in the first test against England. He was chosen at centre, with Len Scott and Lou Brown on either wing, with Arthur Kay inside him at second five eighth. The Herald wrote that he "had already proved himself in big football and is a sound all round player". The Star wrote that "Tittleton only has to reproduce the form he revealed in the Auckland game to be a reliable centre". The England centres were Gus Risman, who also captained the side, and Stan Brogden.

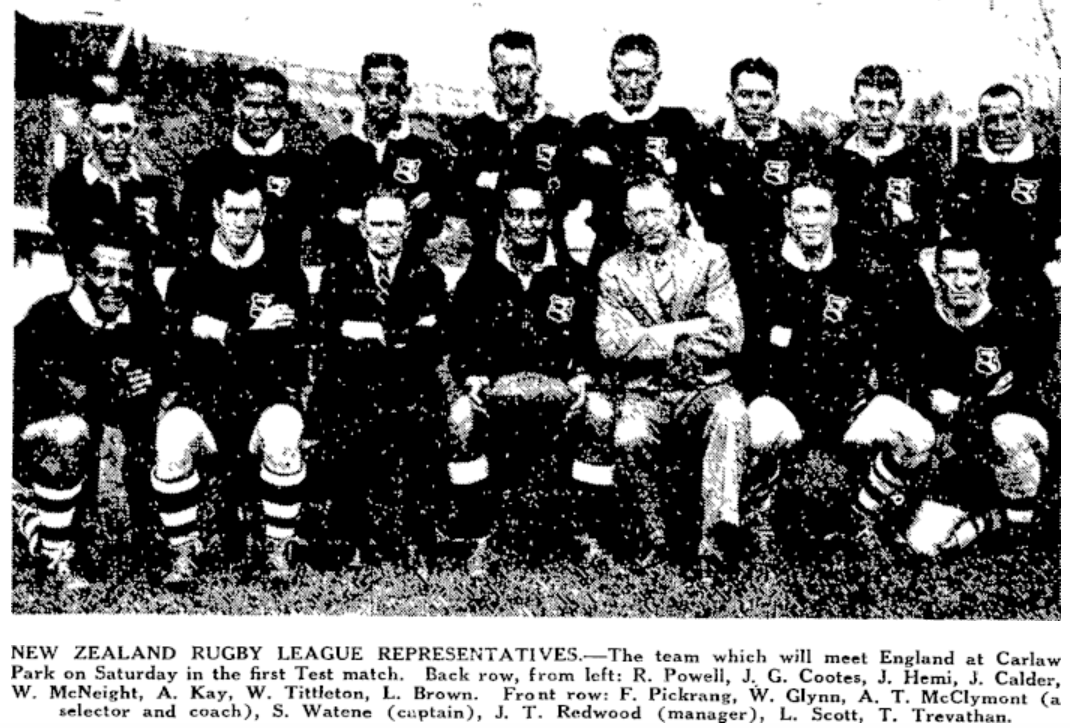

The match played at Carlaw Park saw England win 10–8 before a crowd of 22,000. Early in the match New Zealand attacked and Watene secured the ball, before Powell, Tittleton, and Brown were involved in a passing movement before Risman pushed Brown into touch close to the try line. It was said that "Tittleton, Kay, and Trevarthan had a hard time on defence and generally came through with credit". The Herald wrote that "the covering defence of the New Zealand backs left little to be desired. In this connection Tittleton, Powell, Kay and Trevathan did fine work".

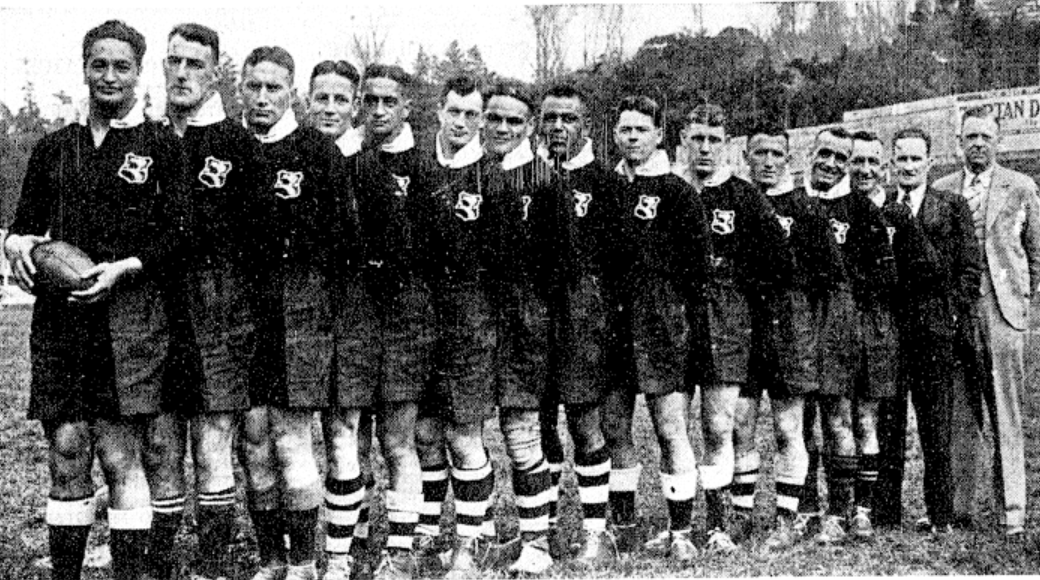
Tittleton, sixth from the right in the NZ team at Carlaw Park

For the second test the back line saw two changes due to injury. At fullback Claude Dempsey came in to replace Jack Hemi, and Tittleton's Richmond teammate Ted Mincham replaced Len Scott on the wing, with Tittleton retaining his place at centre. It was said that "Tittleton has been one of the best backs on the ground in both the games in which he has played against the visitors, and if he maintains his form the Englishmen should be effectively silenced". He was once again matched up against Gus Risman, the English centre. England won the match by 23 points to 11 in "ideal" conditions at Carlaw Park. With the scores tied at 2–2 Harry Woods and Joe Miller "were associated in a fine passing bout and Calder made a feeble effort to tackle, although Tittleton just reached Miller a yard from the goal line". In the second half Tittleton made a bad mistake when he threw an intercept which allowed [Barney] Hudson to race away and score, putting "the result beyond doubt". Of his game overall the Herald wrote that he "did some good work on defence, only to spoil his play by holding on to the ball too much".

Tittleton then returned to his Richmond side for a crucial club game. With 2 rounds left Richmond led the competition by 1 point however they were to lose to Devonport 5–3 in atrocious conditions at Carlaw Park. He nearly scored twice in the first half, and he and Noel Bickerton "often checked sweeping attacks by the Devonport forwards". They had to win their final match against City Rovers and hope that Newton Rangers upset Manukau in the final round. Richmond won 10–2 however Manukau won 26–6 to confine Richmond to runner up, with Tittleton playing well in their last round win. He was involved in a movement with Ted Mincham which enabled Davis to score and "was easily the best of the backs, and his penetration often turned defence into attack". In their Roope Rooster knockout win on September 5 by 24 to 10 he "was always in the picture" at second five eighth, but had to leave the field in the second half with an injury. They were then eliminated from the knockout competition with a 10–8 loss to City where Tittleton had an uncharacteristically poor game, dropping passes. A week later they were also eliminated from the Phelan Shield with a loss to Marist. Tittleton's season came to an end on October 3 when Richmond played Manukau in the Stormont Shield final. Richmond easily won the trophy, scoring a 30–9 victory with Tittleton crossing for one of their 8 tries.

==== New Zealand v Australia (1937) ====
The 1937 season saw Tittleton make the New Zealand team once more, playing in both tests against the visiting Australian side. He played 16 matches for Richmond, scoring 5 tries and also played one match for Auckland, one for Auckland Pākēha, and a New Zealand trial match. He began the season playing in both of Richmond's preliminary round matches on April 17 and 24 against Manukau and Ponsonby respectively. Richmond beat Manukau 15–11 with Tittleton instrumental in setting up their attack, he was "the pivot from whom most of the scoring movements swung" with Ted Mincham scoring all 3 tries, while Wally's brother George Tittleton converted all 3. Against Ponsonby he showed "attacking brilliance, in collaboration with Greenwood" in their 17–10 win. The Herald said he "played a fine game and was the outstanding back". Their opening round Fox Memorial match saw a 13–10 win over Mt Albert. Bert Cooke had returned to the Richmond side and he along with Ted Mincham and Tittleton stood out and "were in form" playing a "solid game" at five-eighths. In a 15–13 loss to Devonport he was "the brains of the Richmond attack… [making] some fine openings at times, but had a tendency to crowd his wingers". The Herald wrote that he "in spite of a hard knock in the early stages, played a fine all-round game. His strong, straight running was a feature and he made several good openings from which tries would have been scored with better finish".

Tittleton was then selected in the Auckland Pākēha side to play Auckland Māori to be played on Coronation Day on May 12. He was chosen at second five eighth with Arthur Kay outside him at centre. The Herald said that "on his present form W. Tittleton is one of the best five eighths in the code and he played a great all-round game for Richmond against North Shore last Saturday. He received a bad knock early in the game, but this did not affect his play. The manner in which he straightens up the attack could well be followed by some other five eighths". In the representative match Auckland Pākēha won 24–14 with Tittleton scoring one of their 6 tries. His try came after he gathered the ball early in the match and "scored a good try between the posts" with the conversion tying the score at 5–5.

He scored again in a 24–6 win over City for Richmond on May 15. He kicked well, using "the short punt to advantage, and often had City defending. On one occasion Tittleton kicked judiciously, Mincham racing 40 yards to touch down for a fine solo try". In Richmond's 14–9 win over Newton in round 5 he was "outstanding". A week later in a 15–6 win over Ponsonby he was the pick of the backs along with Noel Bickerton.

Tittleton was selected to play for Auckland against Taranaki on June 9 at Carlaw Park. The match was played on King's Birthday with Tittleton again at second five eighth with W. Stockley at five eighth. Auckland won by 27 points to 10. Tittleton and Arthur Kay were criticised for holding on too long on occasion, denying Gordon Midgley chances to score, though he was involved in a "nice passing bout" with Steve Watene and then Arthur Kay before McCallum scored.

Richmond then had a crucial win over Manukau to enhance their Fox Memorial championship chances. They won 22–18 with Tittleton and Bickerton combining "well at five eighths and did much effective work, both on attack and defence. The former proved hard to bring down once he had speed up". They won again against a rival for the title, with a 15–2 win over Mt Albert in round 8. He and Mincham were "always looking for the opening and were sound both on attack and defence". He "played a splendid all-round game as five eighths and was in practically every movement, while his defence was excellent". He had spent most of the game in the second five-eighths position but also played at centre at times. He missed their next match against North Shore for unspecified reasons and with him missing they "did not play in their usual rhythm" but still won 11–9 anyway.

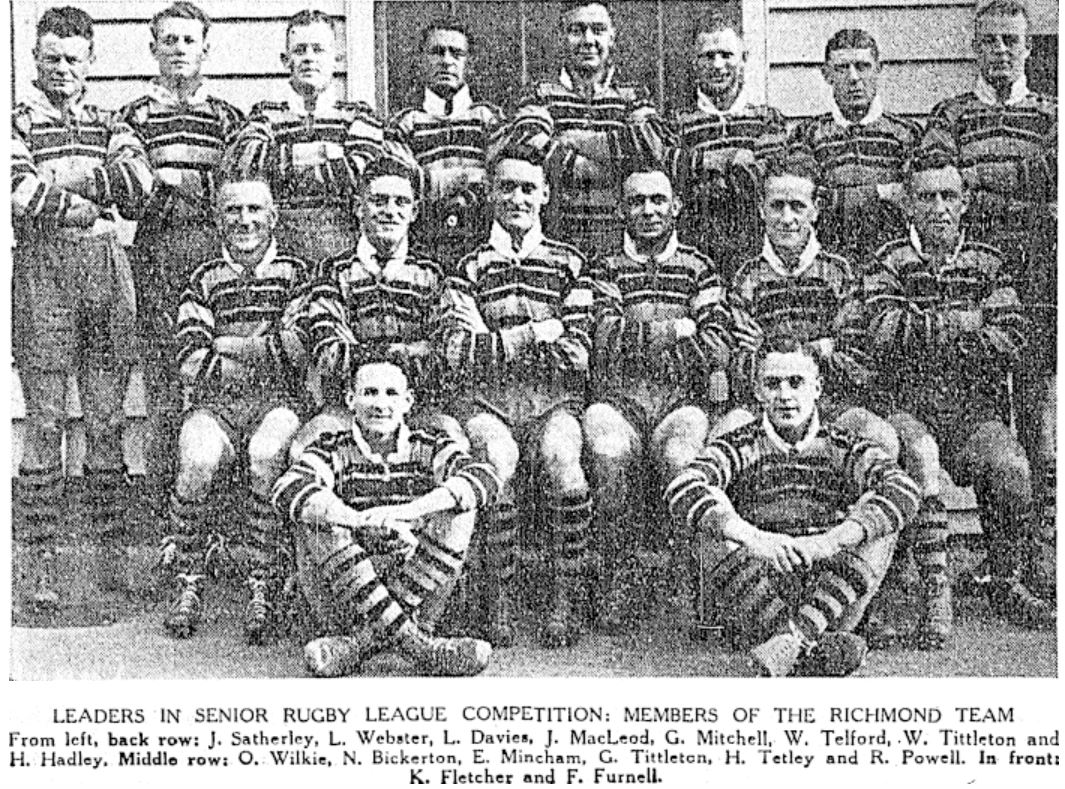

In an upset loss to Ponsonby 10–9, it was only the "quick covering defence by the nippy Richmond backs, and W. Tittleton and Mincham in particular, that prevented the opposition from scoring". He scored their second try after a strong rush. The following week in a 10–6 win over City he "supplied a very keen thrust to the play at times". The Herald wrote that he "was the best of the Richmond backs".

Tittleton was then chosen in a New Zealand trial match. The Australian side was touring New Zealand in August and the selectors were trying to assist with their national side selection. He was chosen in the five-eighths of the Possibles side along with Bickerton, while brothers Rangi Chase and Tommy Chase opposed them in the Probables team. The Herald suggested that on present form he was "easily the best all-round back" chosen in the match. The Possibles side won 25–11 and the Auckland Star said that "Bickerton and W. Tittleton made a better five-eighths line than the Chase brothers, of Manukau…" At halftime the selectors got the five-eighths combinations to switch sides with Bickerton and Tittleton going across to the Probables team and the Chase brothers coming the other way. The following Saturday he and Bickerton again matched up against the Chase brothers, this time in a match for Richmond against Manukau. The match was drawn 11–11 and "Tittleton was right on his game and in addition to showing fine appreciation of his supports defended wonderfully when his side was in dire straits".

==== Test matches ====
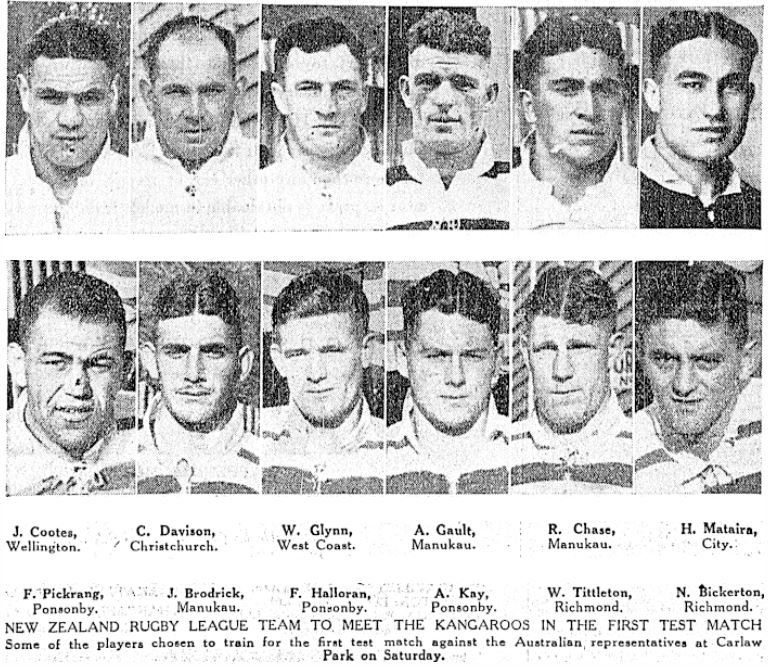

On August 1 Tittleton was named along with Richmond teammate Noel Bickerton in the New Zealand five-eighths positions for the first test against Australia. The New Zealand Herald suggested that Australian five-eighths Ernie Norman and Percy Williams, are high class wet day players... [and that] Bickerton and Tittleton are set a difficult task to check this pair, and sound defence is essential". The match was played in wet weather and the ground in a "bad state". Australia won by 12 points to 8 at Carlaw Park before 19,000 spectators. It was said that the scoreline flattered New Zealand as they were outclassed for the most part. The Auckland Star wrote that "Tittleton was one of the few who was good in attack and defence alike". The Herald also commented on his "solid tackling". He was involved in New Zealand's first try which gave them a 3–0 lead when Ces Davison gained possession and "transferred to Tittleton, Bickerton and Chase, and then Bickerton came in again" to score. Then a while later Billy Glynn "sent the ball out to Riley, Tittleton and Davison, and the speedy winger registered the second try amid intense enthusiasm". Tittleton also did well later in the half when he "followed through smartly to catch Ward in possession" and put Australia under defensive pressure.

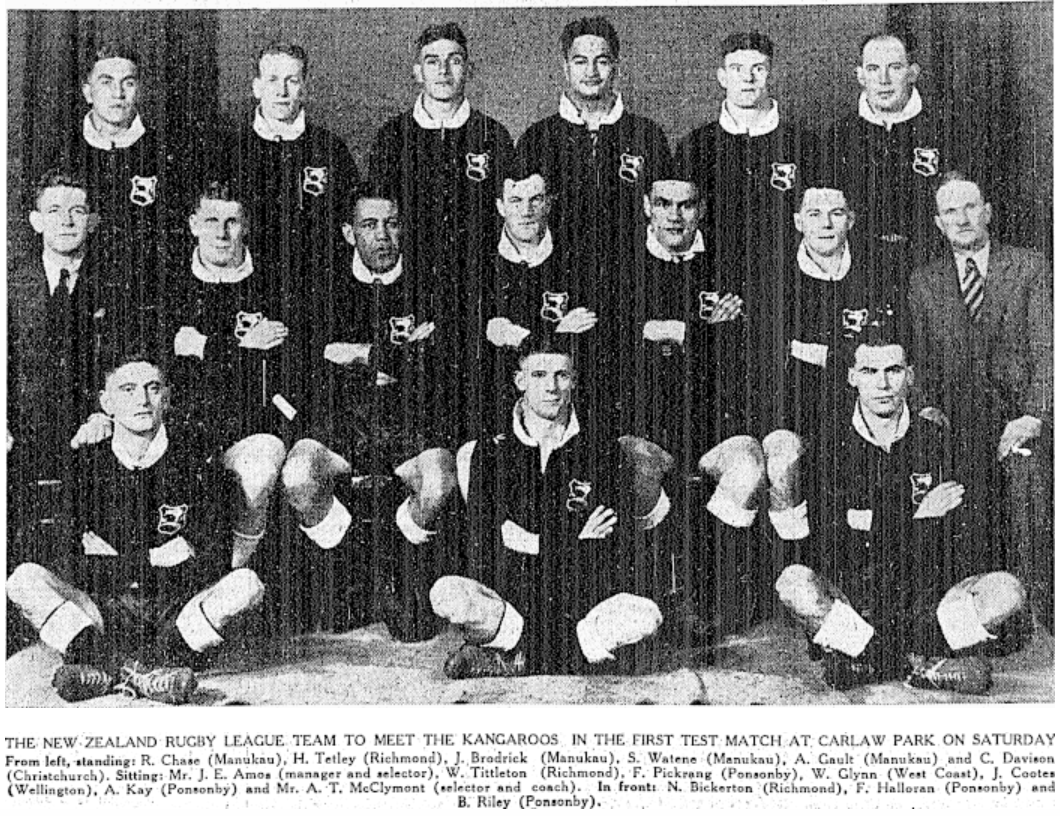

The Herald, in a review of the match, wrote that "the best New Zealand back, was undoubtedly Tittleton, who played a fine game at five eighths. His tackling saved the home side on numerous occasions".

Prior to the selection of the team for the second test the New Zealand selectors requested that Tittleton and 10 others report for training at the Auckland gymnasium on the Monday night following the test. On the Thursday night Tittleton attended a ball arranged for both sides by the Auckland Rugby League ladies’ committee at the Peter Pan Cabaret venue on Queen Street. The previous evening he had been named in the second test side in the centres along with Arthur Kay. They were opposed by Jack Beaton and Ross McKinnon in the centres for Australia.

New Zealand won the match 16–15 again at Carlaw Park. The New Zealand side featured the inclusion of George Nēpia who played brilliantly despite being in the twilight of his career. The Auckland Star wrote that Tittleton in defence "was again a great asset". Australia had been unfortunate in suffering a number of injuries and played much of the game with 11 players and spent some time with just 10. Early in the match with Australia leading 3–2, Frank Halloran gathered the ball while New Zealand were in an attacking position and he cut in before whipping "the ball out to Tittleton, to Davison, who scored at the corner" to give New Zealand the lead. A short time later an attack involving Beaton and Wally Prigg sent Doug McLean over for a try in a tackle from behind by Tittleton.

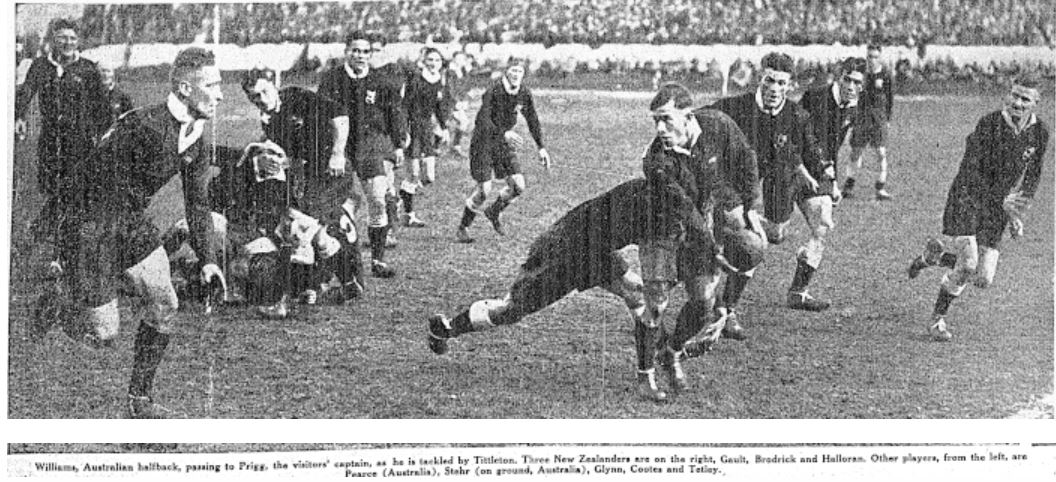

Tittleton was involved in New Zealand's late winning try when they "attacked vigorously and good work by Cootes and Brodrick improved the position. Halloran cut in nicely and passed to Tittleton and Kay, who drew the defence cleverly and sent Bickerton over for a try" to give them a 16–15 lead. The Herald reported that Tittleton "was the best of the three-quarter line, his tackling being an outstanding feature and an object lesson to his fellow-players who were prone to attempt the high collaring so futile against the heavy Australian forwards". The same newspaper said in their review of the match that "W. Tittleton, five eighths, was another New Zealand back who played good football. He took a while to settle down in the second test, but several times beat the opposition with nice runs. His tackling was faultless". They also mentioned that New Zealand probably should have tried to open the game up more in the second half and had he and Bickerton "resorted to grubber kicks the New Zealand vanguard would have scored more tries, for they outplayed the visitors".

Tittleton then returned to his Richmond side for the concluding stages of the club season. They lost to Marist on August 21 by 30 points to 24 in the penultimate round of the championship. The loss meant that Richmond had to win their final round match against Newton to win the title. In the loss to Marist the Auckland Star said that Tittleton "gave another grand performance both in attacking and defensive roles for Richmond. The five eighth frequently made openings, and was in most of his side's scoring movements". Richmond then sealed the Fox Memorial Shield by beating Newton comfortably by 30 points to 9 with Tittleton scoring 1 of their 6 tries. It was said that "Bickerton, Greenwood and W. Tittleton took the principal honours" among the Richmond backs. He was involved in their first try and then his came after he took a pass from Greenwood and scored under the posts. He also "showed perfect understanding with Bickerton". Tittleton scored another try in Richmond's 21–13 loss to City in the first round of the Roope Rooster knockout competition on September 4, however it was to be his last game of the year as he had to leave the field with a broken collarbone. He missed their final two matches against North Shore Albions and Marist.

==== Auckland Player of the Year (1937) ====
Tittleton did however receive one final honour for the season. On October 6 at the Auckland Rugby League meeting it was announced that a special trophy for the season's outstanding senior grade player had been awarded to Wally Tittleton. The award was made by the donor, Mr. J.F.W. Dickson. They said that "Tittleton has shown consistently good form throughout the season".

==== 1938 Richmond captaincy and New Zealand Tour of Australia ====
The 1938 saw Tittleton named as the captain of Richmond. For Richmond he played 14 games and scored 5 tries. He also made another appearance for the North Island and played in 2 matches for Auckland before being selected for the New Zealand tour of Australia.

Richmond's first game was a preliminary match against Mt Albert which they lost 24–15. Richmond handled poorly but "at times W. Tittleton and Bickerton outclassed the opposition with perfect understanding in passing bouts". The Herald noted that Tittleton and Bickerton would again be the inside backs for Richmond and "their combination is sure to test the best other clubs can field". In their first championship match Richmond won 17–14 against Papakura who were playing in their first ever first grade championship match. Tittleton scoring a try in Richmond's win. He was involved in other tries also and played an "outstanding" game and was "splendid". Tittleton scored another try in Richmond's 18–13 win over Ponsonby. His try came after he received a long pass from Harold Tetley which saw Tittleton colliding with a goal post but managed to score anyway. He was said to have done "a lot of good all round work". The Auckland Star mentioned that he and brother George "brought a blend of experience to the side". In an 8–7 loss to Newton the following week the "brothers played good wet weather football". Their next match was very controversial. Richmond were awarded a try after an obstruction. The rule was that the conversion must be taken in line with the offence but the referee allowed the player to run around behind the posts and the conversion from in front on fulltime gave them a 20–19 win. Auckland Rugby League then ordered the match to be replayed at a later date if the result would have a bearing on the standings. Ultimately it was not needed as both teams finished well off the title race. They beat Marist and then lost to Manukau 18–16 with Tittleton continuing his try scoring form. The Herald said "Tittleton, centre, was one of the best backs on the ground, both on attack and defence".

==== Auckland and North Island ====
Following the match with Manukau the Auckland side was named to play a team from the rest of the North Island on May 18. The matches were to assist the New Zealand selectors in choosing the side to tour Australia. The Star wrote that Tittleton had justified his selection as second five eighth with his all-round play. He was to be paired with Walter Brimble who was at first five eighth and his brother Wilfred Brimble at halfback. The Herald said that he "always plays a solid all round game, some of his work at times being tipped with brilliance. He is another player likely to catch the eyes of the selectors when it comes to the final choice of the New Zealand team". Auckland won easily by 67 points to 14 with Tittleton scoring 1 of their 14 tries. He was selected in the North Island team to play the South Island three days later on May 21. He was again paired with Walter Brimble in the halves. The North Island thrashed the South Island by 55 points to 2 at Carlaw Park and Tittleton was subsequently named in the New Zealand side to tour Australia. The selectors were Hec Brisbane, Jim Amos, and Scottie McClymont. He was selected in the five-eighths with the Auckland Star saying that "he was just as adaptable as a centre three-quarter. He handles well and plays consistently". The Herald wrote a piece on each of the touring players and said of Tittleton that he "is 24 years of age and weighs 12st. 7lb. He stands out as the best all-round five eighths in the game. He has had a lot of experience and has a good temperament for big football. Besides being a clever attacking back Tittleton is good on defence, and in this department has always held his own against overseas teams".

==== Australian Tour (1938) ====
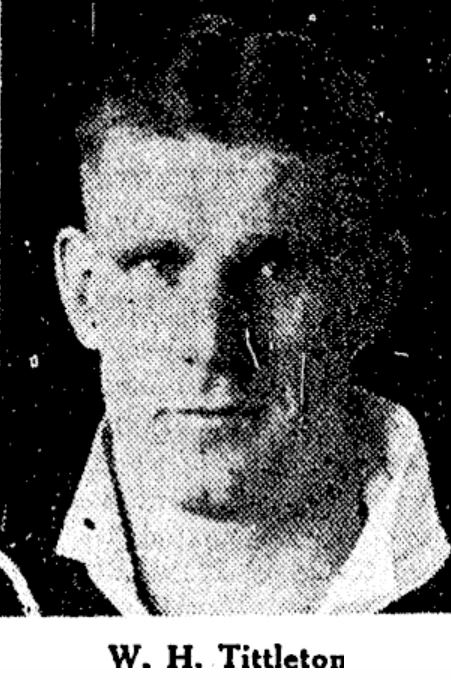

The New Zealand team departed for Australia on June 1 on board the Niagra. With them were the new uniforms for the national side which had until this point wore an all black uniform. For the first time they would wear a black jersey with white ‘V’, white shorts, and socks with black and white hoops. In an article on the New Zealand players which appeared in The Courier-Mail on May 31 it said Tittleton in New Zealand he "is considered another Vic Hey". He was chosen to play at first five eighth in New Zealand's first match against New South Wales on June 11 at the Sydney Cricket Ground. At halfback was Wilfred Brimble. New Zealand lost by 25 points to 12 before a crowd of 28,303. In the first half Tittleton threw a pass to Arthur Kay who scored an equalising try. Then in the second half Kay dislocated his shoulder in a tackle which forced Harold Tetley to five eighth and Tittleton moved to centre. This forced New Zealand to play with 12 for the remainder of the match and they relinquished the lead they had at the time of the injury. The Daily Telegraph said that "Tittleton and Chase were solid in the centre, and are likely to trouble any opposition". The Truth (Sydney) wrote that "Kay, Tittleton and Chase aided by lock forward Tetley moved up smartly and forced them into all-too numerous errors…", and "Chase and Tittleton made sure their men did not go far… and did not miss a thing in the centre".

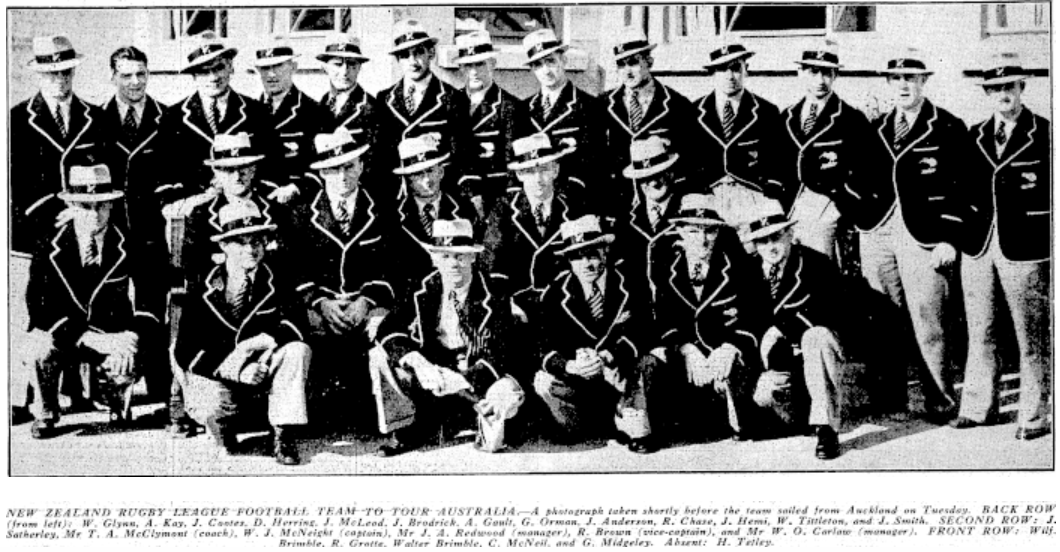

Their second match was against the same opponent on June 13 and saw New Zealand turn the tables winning 37–18 before a crowd of 18,426. Early in the second half New Zealand scored after "Tittleton started the movement, in which Wilfred Brimble, Tittleton, McLeod and Smith handled, the last named reaching out and scoring a good try in the corner"."SURPRISE IN LEAGUE GAME". The Sun. No. 8872. New South Wales, Australia. 13 June 1938. p. 13 – via National Library of Australia."N.Z.-N.S.W." The Telegraph. Queensland, Australia. 13 June 1938. p. 4 – via National Library of Australia. The Courier Mail said that "a feature of the game was the excellent tackling of W. Tittleton and R. Chase, the Kiwi centres. These two players broke up the New South Wales attack in no uncertain fashion, and gave F. Hyde and R. Roser, the New South Wales centre three-quarters, a torrid time"."N.Z. LEAGUE TEAM MAKES FULL AMENDS". The Courier-mail. No. 1492. Queensland, Australia. 14 June 1938. p. 10 – via National Library of Australia. The Referee newspaper in Sydney said that "Smith and Tittleto, quick as cats, turned errors by home backs into tries by very clever football, the second try after perfect running and passing, with the supports most timely"."BEST N.Z. LEAGUE TEAM EVER IN AUSTRALIA". Referee. No. 2673. New South Wales, Australia. 16 June 1938. p. 14 – via National Library of Australia.

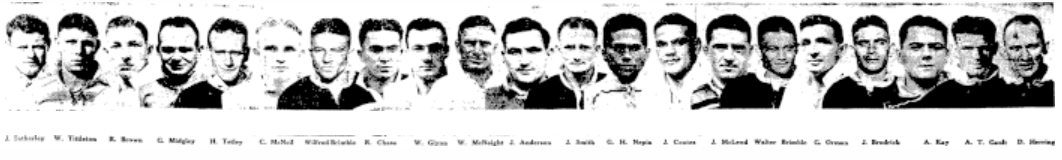

The side traveled north to play North Coast at Lismore with New Zealand winning 23–2 before 2,000 spectators. Tittleton scored one of their 5 tries. It was said that John Anderson could have scored the try but "generously allowed Tittleton to score"."FAR NORTH BEATEN 23 POINTS TO 2 LEAGUE FIXTURE DREW LARGE ATTENDANCE". Northern Star. Vol. 63. New South Wales, Australia. 16 June 1938. p. 10 – via National Library of Australia. The Courier Mail wrote prior to the third tour match that "the Kiwis possess two grand centres in W. Tittleton (Auckland) and R. Chase, the 20-year-old Māori. These players broke up the New South Wales attack on Monday"."BACKS SPEEDY, CLEVER". The Courier-mail. No. 1495. Queensland, Australia. 17 June 1938. p. 12 – via National Library of Australia. Tittleton next played in New Zealand's match against Queensland on June 18 at the Brisbane Cricket Ground. New Zealand was well beaten by 31 points to 11 before 15,000 spectators. He played centre with Rangi Chase again, opposite Hugh Melrose and Charlie Wright. Tittleton "made a few openings and was backed up by Chase, but lack of support ruined his efforts when tries might have resulted". The Telegraph (Brisbane) wrote that "there were brief spirited burts from Chase, Tittleton, and the supporting forwards, but generally the attack was monopolised by the Queenslanders"."Queensland Have 31–11 Win Against Kiwis". The Telegraph. Queensland, Australia. 18 June 1938. p. 4 – via National Library of Australia. The Sunday Mail (Brisbane) published a photograph of Tittleton lining up a tackle on Jack Ryrie. The pair "ran and handled splendidly on the all too few occasions that they got their hands on the ball"."Rugby League. IPSWICH CAN FEEL PROUD OF QUEENSLAND'S SUCCESS". Queensland Times. Vol. LXXVIII, no. 16, 092. Queensland, Australia. 20 June 1938. p. 9 – via National Library of Australia. The primary reason why they struggled was because Walter Brimble at first five had trouble getting the ball out to them despite his brother Wilfred Brimble having a good game at halfback."NEW ZEALANDERS OUTPLAYED BY FIERY FORWARDS". Referee. No. 2674. New South Wales, Australia. 23 June 1938. p. 14 – via National Library of Australia.

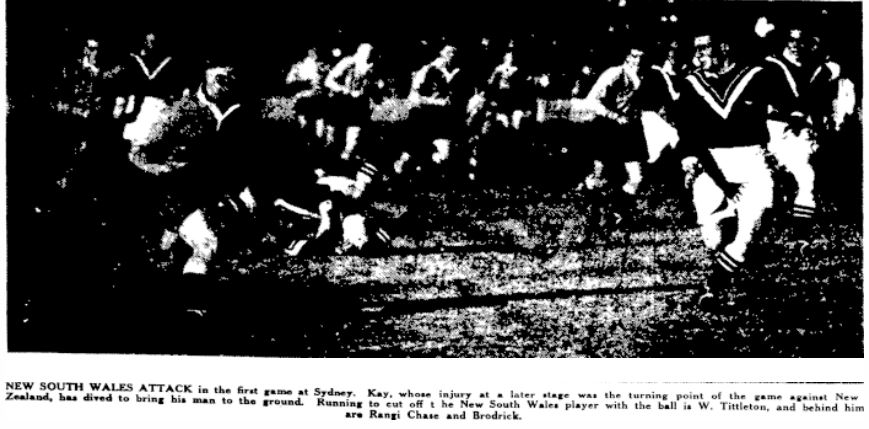

It was suggested in The Telegraph after the match that "Tittleton, … is regarded as one of the most solid defensive players in the side, and he probably will play opposite [Jack] Reardon in an endeavour to curb the man whom the Kiwis consider to be the pivot on which the Queensland attack swings. It is not likely, either, that either Tittleton or Grotte will persist with the tactics which the Brimbles used last Saturday when they continually exploited the grubber kick…", particularly Walter. Reardon had been the captain of Queensland and played in the five eighth position.

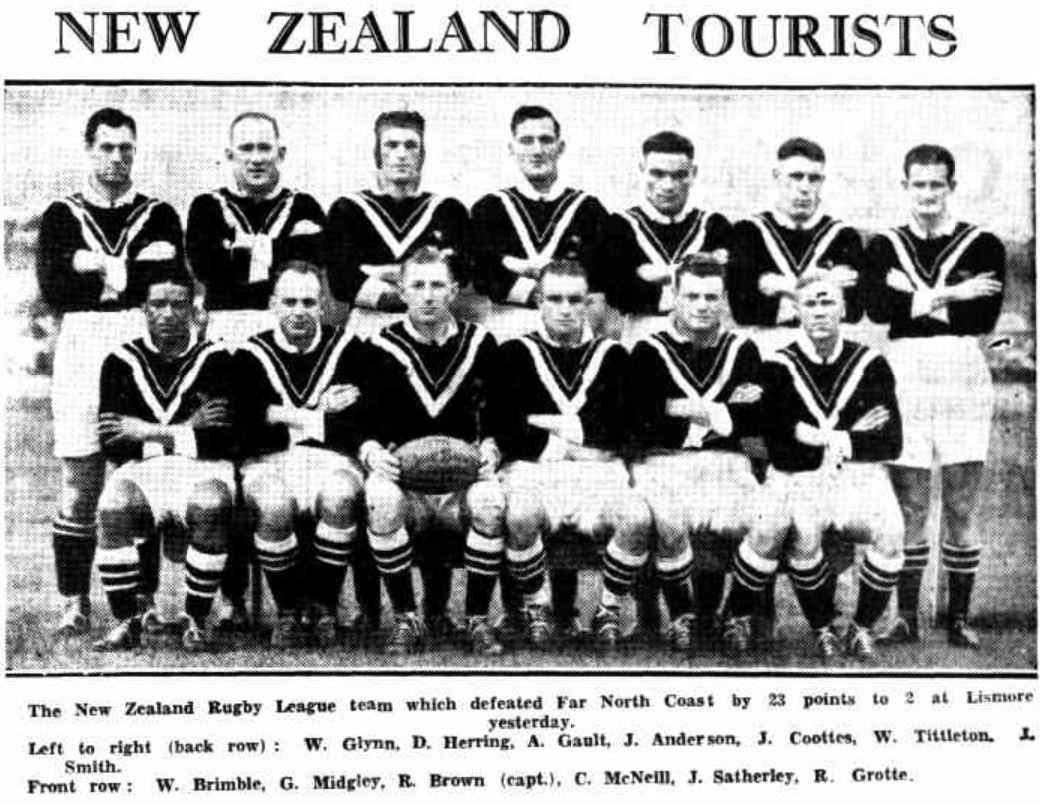

Tittleton was rested from the New Zealand side for a midweek match against Toowoomba on June 22, before being selected for the second match against Queensland on June 25. He was picked at five eight opposite Reardon, though Fred Gilbert at halfback was the captain for this match. New Zealand still lost the match by 21 points to 12 despite several changes in the backline.

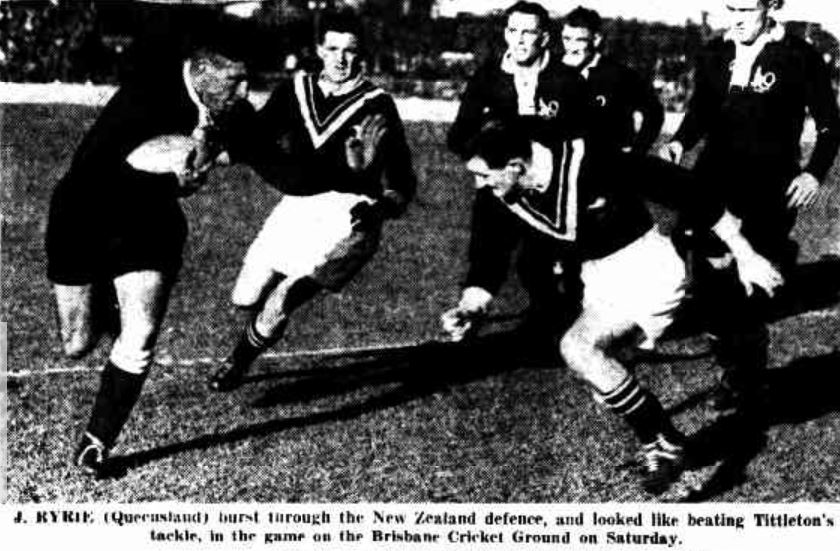

They once again struggled with the 3-yard rule at the play the ball and were penalised heavily, though not as badly as the first match with Queensland. It was said of Tittleton that he "did the most effective job in holding Reardon, who was unable except once to break through dangerously". Tittleton along with Jack Satherly at lock kept "close tag on Reardon". He was also mentioned as tackling well along with Arthur Kay."MAROONS RALLY AND AGAIN BEAT KIWIS". The Telegraph. Queensland, Australia. 25 June 1938. p. 4 (SPORTS FINAL) – via National Library of Australia. In a wordy article on the match in the Truth (Brisbane) newspaper which criticised both teams rather heavily it said some of the New Zealand forward played well, as did Grotte at halfback and "Tittleton, at five eight, was a link without a defensive kink. But outside of these and the forwards the Enzeds tackling wasn't worth tuppence…"."MAROONS AGAIN K.O. KIWIS IN LEAGUE CLASH—21–12". Truth. No. 1996. Queensland, Australia. 26 June 1938. p. 7 – via National Library of Australia. He was involved in New Zealand's second try to Ray Brown. The Sunday Mail saying it "was initiated by Grotte, the half, who played grandly throughout the first half. Brodrick, Tittleton, and Brown added a nice blend of team work and handling to this successful attack". They went on to say that "Grotte and Tittleton, the halves showed the best combination of the Queensland tour"."NZ. Beaten By Second Half Speed". Sunday Mail. No. 427. Queensland, Australia. 26 June 1938. p. 22 – via National Library of Australia. The Telegraph (Brisbane) commented that the New Zealand tackling was once again far too weak, describing it at times as "tiggy", though that "always an exception was Tittleton, and very often, Kay. The introduction of the former as five eighth was a good move by the New Zealanders because it tightened up their defence inside, and bottled up a scoring machine in Reardon. Tittleton too full marks on the day for a grand piece of work in defence, even if he did lack the penetrative ability of five eighths we have known in Hay, and Norman". One scribe in the same newspaper was more effusive saying "Tittleton gave one of the finest exhibitions of defensive five eight play I have seen at headquarters for a long long day. Few of the crowd will readily forget his great effort in stopping Ryrie in the fifteenth minute of the second half."Kiwis Leave Behind Them Quite Good Impression". The Telegraph. Queensland, Australia. 27 June 1938. p. 19 – via National Library of Australia.

Tittleton played in New Zealand's next match against NSW Group 4 on June 29 at Tamworth Oval. New Zealand won 26–15 with Tittleton moving back into the centres and scoring one of their 5 tries. He "combined well in back movements with his winger Clarry McNeil"."KIWIS DEFEAT GROUP TEAM". The Courier-mail. No. 1506. Queensland, Australia. 30 June 1938. p. 9 – via National Library of Australia. Then 3 days later he scored again in a 30–19 win over Newcastle at Newcastle Sports Ground before 5,000 spectators. He was also involved in a try described as one of the "best seen on the ground with the crowd cheering for several minutes". It came after Walter Brimble picked the ball up in his twenty five and passed it to Tittleton, who "passed to Chase. Walter Brimble took it again and the ball then went to Wilfred Brimble and on to John Anderson, Tittleton [again] and Jack McLeod, for the last named to score, and Jack Hemi to add the goal. It was league football at its finest". His try came in the first half after Stegall fumbled the ball from a scrum which let Tittleton through to score with Jack Hemi converting to give New Zealand a 16–2 lead in the first half."Rugby League". The Maitland Daily Mercury. No. 20, 972. New South Wales, Australia. 2 July 1938. p. 6 – via National Library of Australia. The Truth wrote that centres "Wal Tittleton and Rangi Chase were miles ahead of their opponents". He was then selected in New Zealand's final team of the tour for their July 6 match against Sydney at the Sydney Cricket Ground. The match was drawn 19–19. Tittleton was said to be one of New Zealand's best backs along with Gordon Midgley, Arthur Kay, and Rangi Chase. He was involved in a try which gave New Zealand a 17–14 lead late in the match after good lead up work by Midgley, with the ball eventually being "thrown towards the right wing, where, after Tittleton and Kay handled the latter scored a fine try" which Hemi converted."Sydney Snatches A Draw, 19-ALL". The Sun. No. 8892. NSW, Australia. 6 July 1938. p. 32 – via National Library of Australia.

New Zealand then returned on board the Aorangi, arriving at 7.30 am on July 11. Following the tour the New Zealand co-manager on the tour, J.A. Redwood said that Tittleton stood out for his "wonderful defence" and "warmly praised" him. After arriving back in New Zealand, Tittleton was chosen in the New Zealand side to play against Auckland on July 16 at Carlaw Park. Auckland won by 21 points to 13 before a crowd of 15,000. It was said of Tittleton that he was "without showiness, playing in a flawless way, and getting his man always in defence".

==== Richmond and Auckland (1938) ====
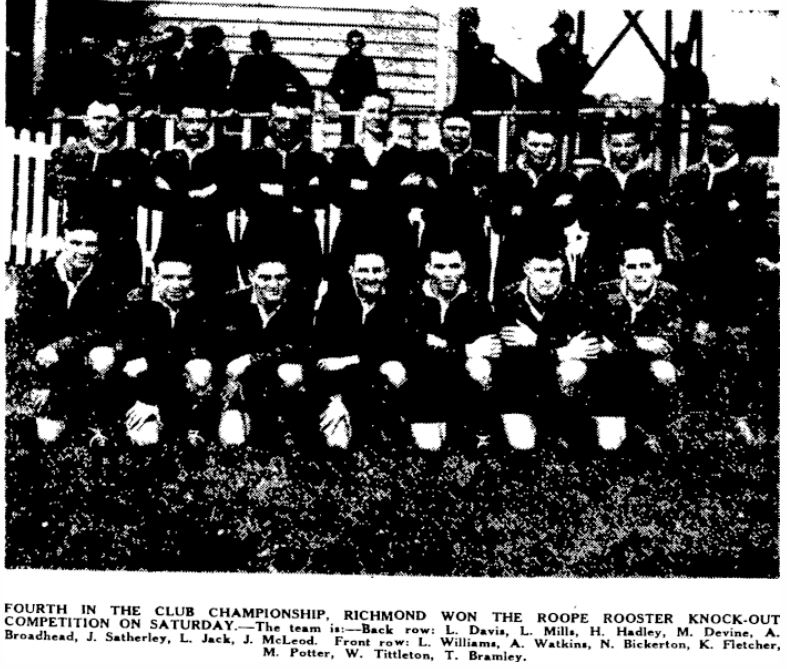

Following his New Zealand representative matches Tittleton returned to the Richmond side, though he missed their July 16 match, possibly resting from his busy tour schedule where he had played all games but one. His first game back was against Manukau on July 30 in a 6–6 draw where he did good defensive work and played a fine all-round game. In their next match they were thrashed by Marist Old Boys 32–4 with Tittleton struggling after his life was made difficult by the poor play of Keith Fletcher. Tittleton, who was captaining the side, had to spend "practically the whole afternoon on defence".

Following the match Tittleton was selected in the Auckland team to play Canterbury at inside centre. Auckland won 28–22 at Carlaw Park in their final fixture of the year. Late in the match Tittleton broke through and set up a try for Trevor Bramley and then he did the same for a try to Rangi Chase. It was said that he was the best all-round back.

For Richmond against City Rovers on August 20 in their final round match Tittleton scored a try in their 24–10 win and played a sound game at centre and was hard to stop. In their round 2 Roope Rooster match with Ponsonby, which they won 19–6 the Auckland Star merely commented that he was "sound as usual". Richmond then won their semi-final against North Shore by 20 to 7 with Tittleton scoring one of their tries. They then won the Roope Rooster trophy on September 17 with a 20–8 win over City. He captained the side and "was the outstanding back at centre and he did some excellent work both on attack and defence".

Richmond had one of their biggest club matches in some time when they played the Eastern Suburbs side which was touring from Sydney on October 1. Tittleton was chosen in his normal position of centre opposite Frank Hyde and Percy Dermond. Richmond won 11–0 before a large crowd of 11,000 with Tittleton showing "superb defence". The New Zealand Herald said that he "gave a fine display of defensive work, and made no mistakes about getting his men with splendid, low tackles. Two or three times on attack he held possession when tries looked possible. He was unlucky in the first spell when he lost the ball over the line" after taking a pass from Laurie Mills. He had also thrown a "wild pass" soon after kick off which Frank Hyde intercepted and it eventually led to a try to Robinson. Later in the match he saved a "certain try" with a "great tackle of Rod O'Loan". Richmond's final match of the season was in the Stormont Shield final against Marist. Richmond won a close match 9 points to 8 to claim their 4th Stormont Shield title. Tittleton scored a try and was "sound as ever in the centre". And thus ended the busiest year of his career where he played in 26 matches in total.

==== 1939 Richmond, North Island and New Zealand tour of England ====
Tittleton began his 4th season with Richmond on April 1 against City. The season had begun particularly early because New Zealand was sending a team for a lengthy tour of England midway through the year. They won 15–14 with Tittleton involved in a try to Laurie Mills. He "took some time to settle down, but was very solid in the second half". Late in the match made a "dazzling run" to save the day for Richmond when City had been threatening. He was then selected in the Richmond side to play against a touring Sydney XIII on April 10. It was originally intended that Balmain would tour but they were unable to due to several players unavailable. In the end Ray Stehr of the Eastern Suburbs club got together players from a range of Sydney club. It was a strong side featuring many Australian internationals. Tittleton was opposed by Aub Mitchell in the centre position. Richmond won a very physical match by 17 points to 16 to continue the club's extraordinary run of wins over Australian touring club teams throughout the 1930s. Tittleton was said to have "tackled superbly". The Herald also said that "Tittleton, at centre, did a lot of useful work and his tackling was very sound". He and George Mitchell "impressed with strong runs well into the visitors’ territory".

Tittleton missed Richmond's round 3 match with North Shore on April 22 after he, and two other Richmond players had influenza. He was back for a 9–0 loss to Mount Albert but "was practically a defender all day and he did some fine work in this department at centre". In a 15–5 win over Manukau his "glorious defence" was a feature of their play. Richmond then won 23–17 against Papakura at Prince Edward Park in Papakura on May 20. The New Zealand Herald published a list of players that were in form who would be in the frame for New Zealand selection for their tour and Tittleton's name was included in the centres position along with Verdun Scott, Marshall, and Arthur Kay. he "defended ably" in a 14–10 loss to Ponsonby on May 27 before scoring his first try of the season in a 22–11 loss to Newton on June 3. He scored again in their 24–10 win over Marist on June 5. He played a "splendid game" and "showed a return of his best form". In an 8–0 win over City he was said to have "hung on a little too long, but otherwise played a sound game". Another try followed in a 26–14 win over Marist, when he was sent in by Dave Solomon who had recently joined the side from rugby. He scored once more against North Shore on June 24 with the Herald writing that he was "fast regaining his best form" but "spoiled an otherwise good display by hanging on too long" in their 9–8 loss. In what would be his last match for Richmond for the season he "had limited chances on attack, but defended well" in their 11–6 loss to Mount Albert.

==== North Island ====
On July 5 he was named in the North Island at centre with Arthur Kay and Roy Nurse on the wings. The Star noted that he was "a player of wide experience". They said in another article that his selection "might be criticised on recent form, although need of defensive quality may have influenced selections". He was then appointed captain of the North Island side, with Rex King to captain the South Island. The North Island won comfortably on July 8 at Carlaw Park with a 35 to 13 win, with Tittleton scoring one of their 7 tries. The match was played before 15,000 spectators with the ground in a poor state. He "was very sound at centre and showed to advantage in the heavy conditions. His tackling was solid". In the first half Davison made a spectacular run but was well talked by Tittleton. Then a short time later he and Kay combined cleverly for Tittleton to "scoop the ball back infield and Nurse scored". His try came close to halftime when Laurie Mills was stopped but got the ball back to Tittleton for the try.

==== New Zealand selection (1939 Tour to Great Britain and France) ====
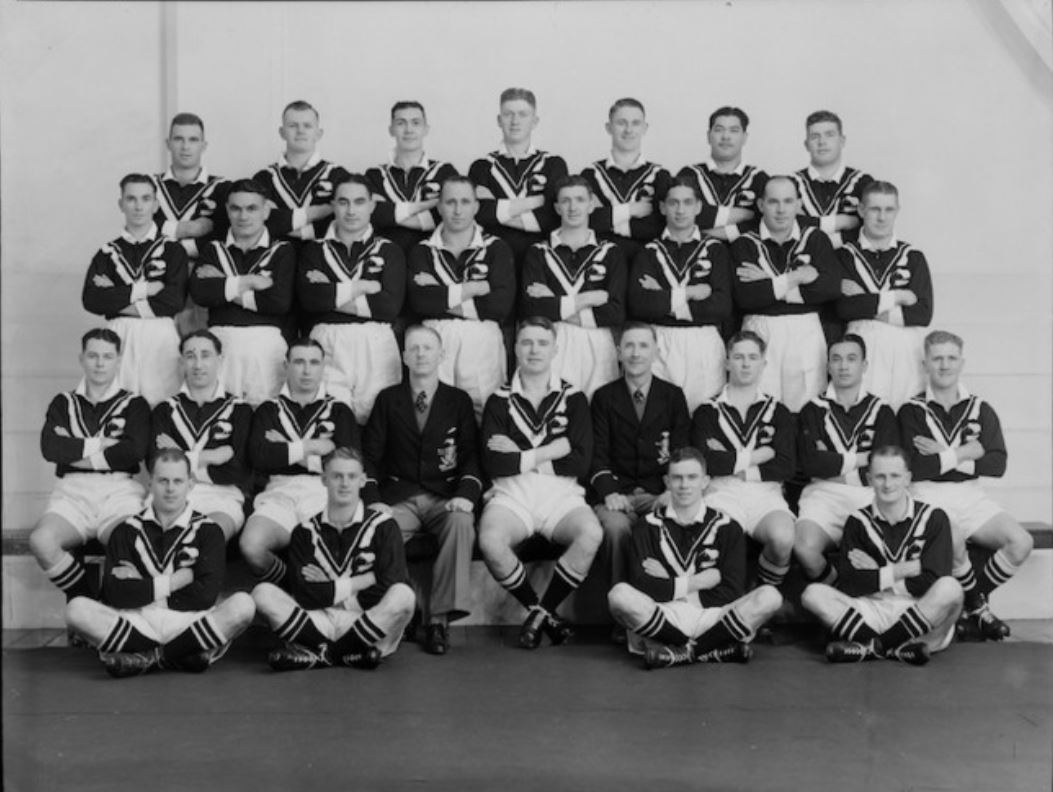
The 1939-40 touring side. Tittleton is standing in the second row on the extreme right.

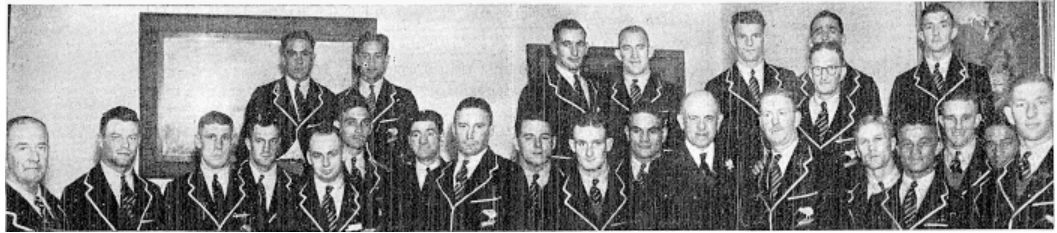

On July 10 Tittleton was named in the New Zealand team to tour England. The Auckland Star wrote a short profile of the players and mentioned that Tittleton by this time was aged 25 and weighed 12 stone. The Herald mentioned that he "is one of the soundest backs in the game. He came originally from South Auckland [Waikato], and can play well at centre or five eighths". The team had been selected by Scotty McClymont, J.A. Redwood, and Jim Amos and Tittleton was said to have only just missed out on being named vice captain for the tour.

Tittleton was working at the Auckland Railway Station at the time and was farewelled by his employees prior to his departure. Mr. R. McLennan presented Tittleton with a "well filled wallet and wished him every success on the tour". The 18 Auckland members of the side were farewelled in Auckland on July 26 at the railway station by several hundred friends who had gathered. They were travelling to Wellington to join the rest of the team before setting sail on board the Rangitiki on July 27. The Rangitiki left Panama on August 16, and was due to arrive in London on August 28.

After arriving in England the first tour match was against St Helens on September 2. New Zealand won 19–3 before 4,000 spectators at Knowsley Road in St Helens. Tittleton played at centre along with Bob Banham. Unfortunately a day later England declared war on Germany and World War 2 commenced. The English rugby football league held an emergency meeting and decided that the best option was to cancel the tour. The New Zealand high commissioner in London, Bill Jordan, organised for the players to board the same ship they had arrived on. Prior to their departure the team managed to play a second tour match against Dewsbury which was also won 22–10 on September 9 before a crowd of 6,200, though Tittleton did not play in this match. The side arrived back in New Zealand on October 24.

=== Continues with Richmond and Auckland (1940) ===
Tittleton resumed his career with Richmond at the start of 1940. He was to play 20 games and score 13 tries which was the 3rd most of any player in the Auckland senior competition. It was to be a successful season for Richmond, winning the first grade championship for the 4th time in their history. His first game was their round 1 match with Papakura in a 56–2 thrashing at Carlaw Park on April 20. Despite the scoreline the Auckland Star said that he "did not reveal his best form at centre". In an 11–6 loss to Newton a week later he "ran determinedly when given a chance". He scored his first try of the season against North Shore on May 4 in a 15–12 win. Of the Richmond threequarters he was the "most impressive with incisive work at centre". In a 4–4 draw with Manukau he and Andrew Kronfeld "proved dangerous threequarters". In another win, this time over City he scored his second try of the season and was the best of the three-quarters along with Trevor Bramley. He scored a try for Richmond in a 24–11 loss to Mt Albert on June 15 but was said to not be prominent until the second half when he did a lot of useful work. Another try followed on July 6 in a 32–2 win over Papakura where Dave Solomon made "many clever openings for Tittleton and Mills". Then against Newton in round 11 he "at centre, played a splendid game and his good all-round form paved the way for the deciding tries" of which he scored one. In a 22–6 win over Manukau in round 13 he was "at the top of his form", giving "an exceptionally sound display… the Auckland and New Zealand representative played a great pivotal game and always improved the position in attack and revealed strong defensive powers. For sheer, solid defence Tittleton has no superior in Auckland league football, he gave his best display of the season on Saturday". He and Mills were the best three-quarters in Richmond's 22–8 win over City in round 14. The next round Richmond beat Ponsonby 10–6 in a victory that all but sealed the championship for Richmond. Tittleton "gave the back line added force". They won the championship in round 16 when they beat Marist 13–5 with Tittleton adding to his try tally. He "gave his usual brainy exhibition at centre, making an admirable link between the five eighths and the wings, while his defence was excellent". Despite the championship being decided the Round 18 match with Mt Albert needed to be played as a runner-up needed to be found to assist with finding an opponent for Richmond for the Stormont Shield in the even that they also won the Roope Roosters. Richmond lost to Mt Albert 25–21 though Tittleton crossed for his 7th try of the season. He was one of "the most dangerous backs for Richmond".

In the Roope Rooster competition Richmond won their first match which was in round 2 against City by 32 to 26. Tittleton added another try with his play being "of a very high standard". he was "the outstanding back and in every effective movement". In the semi-final they beat Papakura 27 to 13 with Tittleton scoring twice for the first time in the season. He "played his usual sound game and scored tries by strong, straight running". In the Roope Rooster final he scored a hat trick in an easy 31–7 win over Ponsonby on September 28 to secure their 6th ever Roope Rooster title. The Herald wrote that a feature of the game was "the brilliant play of W. Tittleton, at centre-threequarters for Richmond. His straight running was an object lesson. Tittleton, who played easily his best game this season, tackled very soundly". His final game of the season was in a 15–10 loss to North Shore for the Stormont Shield before a crowd of 5,000 at Carlaw Park.

==== Richmond, Auckland, Auckland Pākehā (1941) ====
The 1941 season saw Tittleton play 20 games for Richmond once again, scoring 7 tries. With the war on there was very little representative football on with travel restrictions most representative type matches were played within provinces. Tittleton had not been selected for either of the Auckland Pākehā matches with Auckland Māori in 1940. In 1941 however he was selected in both of Auckland's matches and the one game Auckland Pākehā played. He scored in an opening round win over Ponsonby, 15–12 on May 3. The following week Tittleton set up all 4 of Alan Sayers tries for Richmond in a 27–5 win over Marist. Sayers had recently joined the Richmond club and would later win a bronze medal in the 1938 British Empire Games in Sydney in athletics.

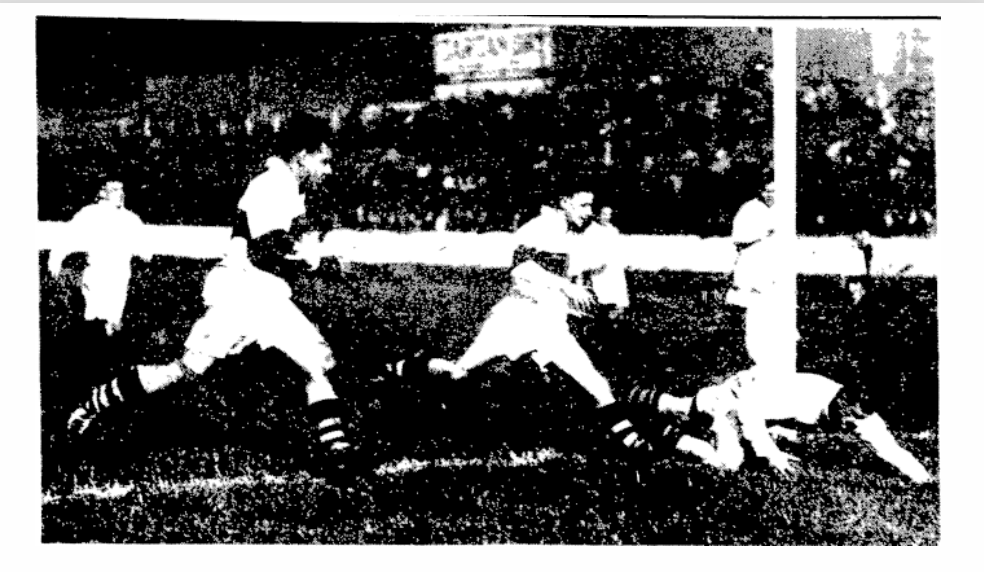
Scoring against Newton on June 14 at Carlaw Park.

Then following a 13–5 win where he scored another try the Auckland Star said "Tittleton is showing up much better this season as a strong, straight-running centre". The Herald said "Solomon and Tittleton carried the bulk of Richmond's attack… Tittleton's defence was particularly valuable in the early stages". His hard straight running in the centre position was also noted after their round 4 win over North Shore. A week later Alan Sayers scored a record 7 tries in a 32–4 win over Papakura with Tittleton involved in several of them. Tittleton scored himself in a June 14 loss to Newton with a photograph of him scoring appearing in the Auckland Star. He was said to have played a "very resolute game". He sent Sayers in for another try on June 21 in their 13–8 loss to Mt Albert, with the Auckland Star writing that he and Solomon were the most "thrustful backs". He threw the final pass for Lyndsay Jack's try and kicked for Sayers try in a round 9 win (9–7) over Manukau. Tittleton was then selected to play centre for Auckland against South Auckland (Waikato) on July 12.

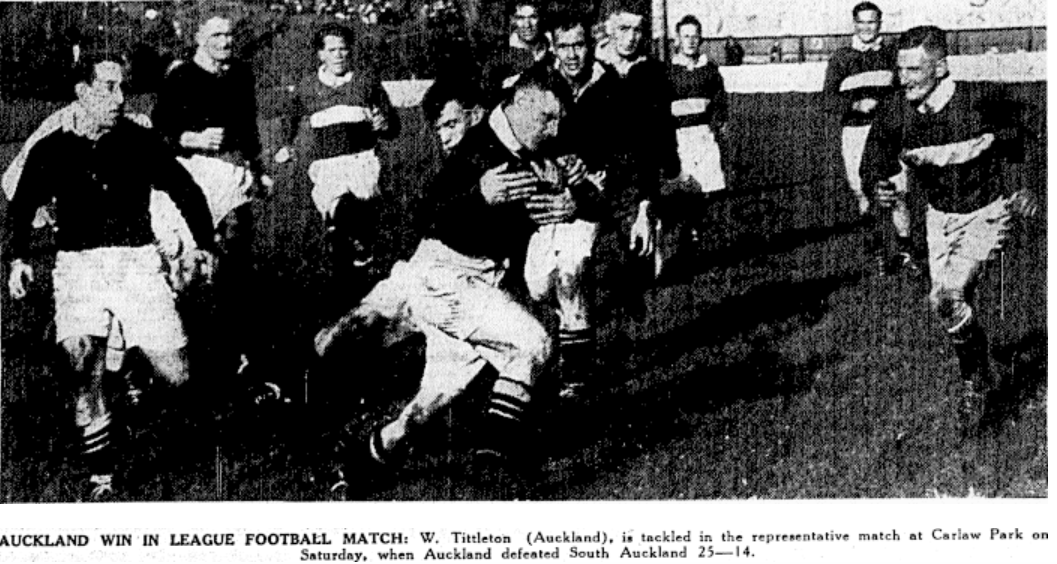

The Auckland Star wrote that "the chosen centre, W. Tittleton, of Richmond, is the well known representative player, and has been showing great form. He is regarded as the best defensive back in league football, and this season his attacking play has been marked with determination and real thrust". Auckland won by 25 points to 14 before 9,500 spectators at Carlaw Park. He set up W. Butler's try when he ran him "into perfect position". He was "very sound at centre three-quarter" and also paved the way for another of Butler's three tries. He then scored a try for Richmond in a 21–18 win over Ponsonby on July 19. In a 19–9 win over Marist a week later he and Solomon were credited with "holding up many Marist attacks" with the "excellent defence". He scored again against City but this time Richmond lost their round 12 match 12–8. He scored another try in Richmond's 46–8 defeat of Papakura after he "cut the opposition to pieces". The Star wrote that he was "sound at centre" and in "every single scoring movement". In a loss to North Shore he set up Richmond's only try to Alan Sayers, and he also saved a try tackling Clarke who looked certain to score. In another loss to Manukau in round 15 Tittleton showed "resource in opening up the play". Dave Solomon was away so Tittleton had had to move in to the second five eighth position. He played in the same position for Auckland in their second match against South Auckland on September 6 at Davies Park in Huntly. Auckland won 26–15 with Robert Grotte playing alongside Tittleton in the five eighth position. The pair of them defended very well in the win. Tittleton then travelled with the Richmond side to Wellington to play the Miramar club side on September 14. Richmond lost 12–8 in wet conditions. The Evening Post wrote that Webb, Jack and Tittleton combined well in the backs.

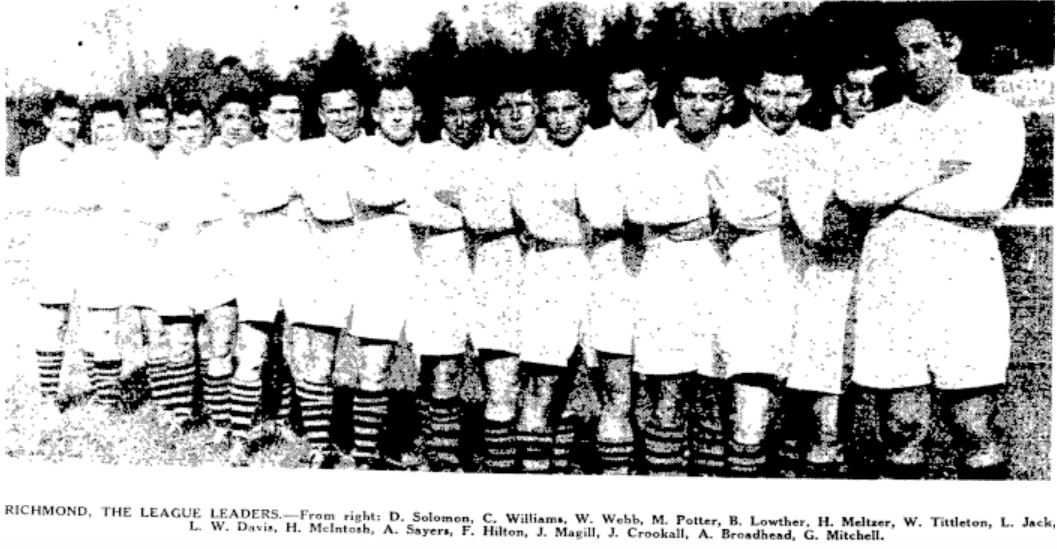

Tittleton was selected in the Auckland Pākehā team to play Auckland Māori on September 20. Tittleton was at centre and opposed by Jack Hemi. The Māori side won 21–17 before a crowd of 6,000. Tittleton was involved in the first two of Brian Riley's three tries. Tittleton "tackled soundly at centre three-quarter". In Richmond's round 2 Roope Rooster loss to Marist, 11–10 on September 27 Tittleton was re-joined by his brother George Tittleton for the first time in over a year. Tittleton set up a try to Ted Mincham who had recently returned to help out the side which was missing players due to injury and the war effort. Richmond were now dropped into the Phelan Shield knockout competition after their Roope Rooster defeat and beat Ōtāhuhu Rovers 18–14 with Tittleton scoring one of their four tries. Their season came to an end soon after. They beat City 13–7 in the Phelan Shield semi-final with Tittleton being "prominent" in the Richmond backs. Before a loss to Mt Albert in October in the final.

=== Switch to rugby (Motor Transport Pool) in 1942 ===
In 1942 a Military side asked the Auckland Rugby League if they could join the Auckland competition however the league was concerned that the side might take players away from the existing senior sides and declined the request. The players then decided to enter a rugby team to compete for the Gallaher Shield, Auckland's premier club rugby competition. The team was filled with many rugby league players, with Tittleton one of them along with his brother George, Brian Riley, George Mitchell, Bob Scott, John Anderson, Fred Zimmerman, Ivan Gregory, James Silva, Clarrie Peterson, and Bill Glover amongst others. They went on to surprisingly win the competition. The side was named M.T.P. which stood for Motor Transport Pool. Tittleton's first game came against Air Force on May 2 in a 16–9 loss at Eden Park. With many players who hadn't played rugby union before the team struggled initially and they lost 11–0 to Grafton-Ponsonby a week later in the last of the preliminary games. Then against the same opponent a week later they had their first win by 14 points to 6 in the opening competition round match. They beat Garrison 10–9 on May 23 in round 2. Another one point win followed over Manukau Rovers a week later, 14–13 at Eden Park. The Herald wrote that Gregory, Riley, and the Tittleton brothers were the best backs on the winning side". In a 14–9 win over Technical Old Boys on June 6 Tittleton and the other backs "often showed up in spectacular runs". In a top of the table clash on June 27, M.T.P. beat Air Force No. 2 by 13 points to 3 to take the outright lead in the Gallaher Shield. Tittleton played first five eighth and he and Gregory who was at centre were criticised for frequently holding on too long. They beat C.R.O. before suffering their first competition loss to Garrison on July 11 by 13 points to 9. The Auckland Star said that "W. Tittleton again played a capital all-round game at five eighth". On July 18 M.T.P had a 10–8 win over Ranfurlys.

So impressive was Tittleton in his first season of rugby union that he was then selected by Fred Lucas as a reserve for the Auckland team to play against an Army side in early August. He wasn't required to play however and his next game was for M.T.P. against C.R.O. on August 8. They drew 12–12 with Tittleton and Gregory playing "fine games" and were "ever on the alert". Tittleton "made two splendid openings, one resulting in a try" while the other should have but Gregory was obstructed. After a 16–8 win over Technical Old Boys on August 29, M.T.P. had all but secured the title. Tittleton scored his first try for the side. The Auckland Star wrote that "W. Tittleton at second five eighth played a good all-round game as has been his want throughout the season. Both on attack and defence he was a thorn in the side of the opposition, and is undoubtedly among the best backs in the competition and unlucky not to catch the selector's eye". The Herald said he and Riley "made good openings for their supports" and "Tittleton paved the way for the first try with a strong straight dash in which he broke past three opponents". They beat A.S.C. 21 to 12 on September 6. They then lost to Grafton-Ponsonby 19 to 6 with "Tittleton and Gregory the best backs". M.T.P. then won the Gallaher Shield when they defeated Air Force No. 2 by 25 to 6 at Gribblehirst Park in Sandringham on September 13. Tittleton scored one of their 5 tries.

Tittleton was originally named as a reserve for Auckland Army against Pukekohe on October 4 but then was named as the captain of the side. He led the Army side to a 22–9 victory at Eden Park. He was involved in a try to Weston after Tittleton "dashed into a gap just outside his own twenty-five" and sent it on to Weston.

=== Move-back to rugby league ===
With the rugby season finished in Auckland a match was arranged by the N.Z. Rugby League Old Boys’ Association Social Club. The match was between a Māori side which included many of the Manukau rugby league side and was essentially a full Auckland Māori representative team, and a team named the "All Golds". The All Golds were essentially the M.T.P. side which had competed in the Gallaher Shield and it included Tittleton. The game was played at Western Springs Stadium on October 17. The All Golds won 18 points to 9 with Tittleton performing "splendid tackling".

1943 saw Tittleton return to his Richmond side. He played in 16 games and scored twice. He played in their opening round match against Newton in a 16–12 loss. Former New Zealand international Cliff Satherley also rejoined the side after several years away from the game. Tittleton "played a solid game at centre, and his experience was valuable to the younger members of the team". In Richmond's round 4 win over Mt Albert by 15 to 4, Tittleton was part of a "clever pair" along with Hankins at five eighth. He scored one of their two tries in a 6–0 win over Marist a week later with Harkin benefiting from playing "in the intermediate line" with "a mature and tried player in W. Tittleton". He scored again in a 26–12 win over North Shore on June 19 and "blended" well with Payne. He and Payne "worked in unison" in a 23–0 win over Ōtāhuhu Rovers on June 26 in the five-eighths positions. With the war on there was less coverage of the sporting competitions as there was previously and Tittleton was not mentioned again until Richmond's final championship match of the season against Manukau. Richmond won 10–5 and finished 3rd in the Fox Memorial competition.

==== Retirement and return with Ponsonby ====
In 1944 Tittleton did not play at all and had retired from the game. However, in 1945 he returned to the field though this time in the jersey of Ponsonby United. He played in the September 3 loss to his old Richmond side by 7 points to 3. He tackled well and "checked Kelly from making play for the wings". It is unknown if he continued to play beyond this point.

== Personal life and death ==
On May 8, 1935, Wally Tittleton married Jessie May Bugslach (1917–1985). They lived in Ngaruawahia on Waipa Esplanade. Wally was a dairy factory employee at this time.

On September 9, 1937, he and his wife had a son whilst living in Beach Haven. They were living on Brentwood Avenue in 1938 with Tittleton working as a labourer. On February 13, 1939, they had a daughter at "Nurse Stewart's" while living at 33 Kingsley Street in Grey Lynn. Following his retirement from playing Tittleton and his family had moved to Craddock Street in Avondale with Wally still working as a labourer in 1949. On March 11, 1953, his father died in Auckland aged 72. By 1954 they had moved to Holbrook Street but were still living in Avondale. Tittleton's occupation according to census records was now a caretaker. They remained there through until at least the early 1980s. His occupation was still a caretaker in 1963 before being listed in census records as a cleaner in 1969 and a labourer in 1972 while Jessie was a stock clerk. Wally's brother George Tittleton died on November 12, 1984.

His wife, Jessie died in 1984. She was cremated at Purewa Cemetery in Meadowbank, Auckland, in 1985. Wally died in 1988 in Huntly and was buried in the Waikato aged 74.
