= 1933 New Zealand rugby league season =

Seasons
- ← 1932 1934 →

The 1933 New Zealand rugby league season was the 26th season of rugby league that had been played in New Zealand.

== International competitions ==
New Zealand played in no international matches in 1933.

The New South Wales Rugby League's St. George Dragons toured, playing five matches. St. George defeated Taranaki 22–14 in New Plymouth before defeating Devonport 19-8 and Newton 30–23. St. George then lost to Marist 25-11 and Richmond 5–3. All four Auckland matches were played at Carlaw Park. The Richmond-St. George match was labelled the "roughest game since Carlaw Park was opened". The Auckland Rugby League then organised a match between the two "Dragon slayers", in which Richmond defeated Marist 31–8.

== National competitions ==
=== Northern Union Cup ===
West Coast held the Northern Union Cup at the end of the season. They defeated South Auckland 8–6 in Huntly to win the trophy.

== Club competitions ==
=== Auckland ===
Devonport won the Auckland Rugby League's Fox Memorial Trophy and the Stormont Shield. Richmond won the Roope Rooster and the Norton Cup.

Puti Tipene (Steve) Watene played for the City Rovers.

=== Wellington ===
Celtic won the Wellington Rugby League's Appleton Shield.

=== Canterbury ===
Hornby won the Canterbury Rugby League's McKeon Cup.

New Brighton and the Pirates club from Phillipstown gamed senior status.

=== Other Competitions ===
Runanga defeated Addington 18–13 to retain the Thacker Shield.
