= George Tittleton =

New Zealand international rugby league footballer (1909-1984)

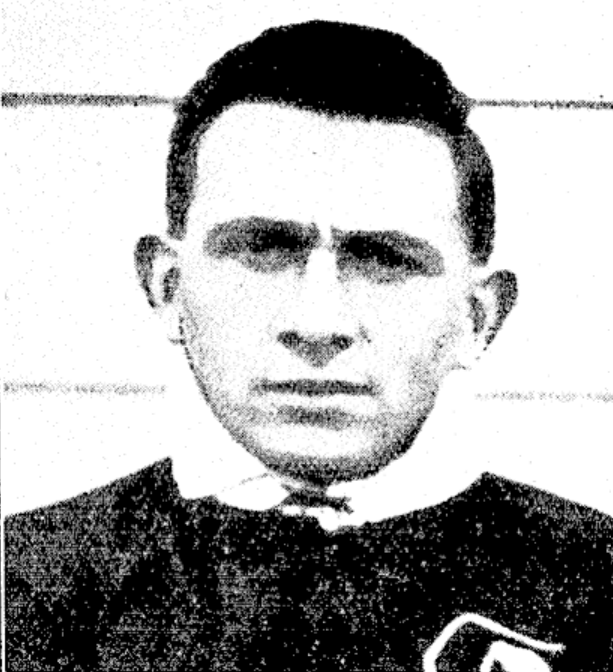

Personal information
- Full name: George Edward Francis Tittleton
- Born: 8 September 1909 Huntly, Waikato, New Zealand
- Died: 12 November 1984 (aged 75) New Zealand

Playing information
- Position: Wing, Fullback, Centre
Club
Years	Team	Pld	T	G	FG	P
1928–30	Ngaruawahia	11	7	3	0	27
1931–35	Taupiri	1	2	1	0	8
1936–41	Richmond	50	25	25	0	125
	Total	62	34	29	0	160
Representative
Years	Team	Pld	T	G	FG	P
1928–30	South Auckland	6	4	2	0	16
1928–30	Southern/South/Possibles (Waikato Trials)	3
1930	North Island	1	0	0	0	0
1935–37	Auckland Province	3	0	6	0	12
1935–36	New Zealand	5 (1)	1	0	0	3
1937	Auckland	2	0	6	0	12
- Relatives: Wally Tittleton (brother)

George Edward Francis Tittleton (8 September 1909 – 12 November 1984) was a New Zealand rugby league player who represented New Zealand. His brother, Wally, also played rugby league for New Zealand.

== Playing career ==
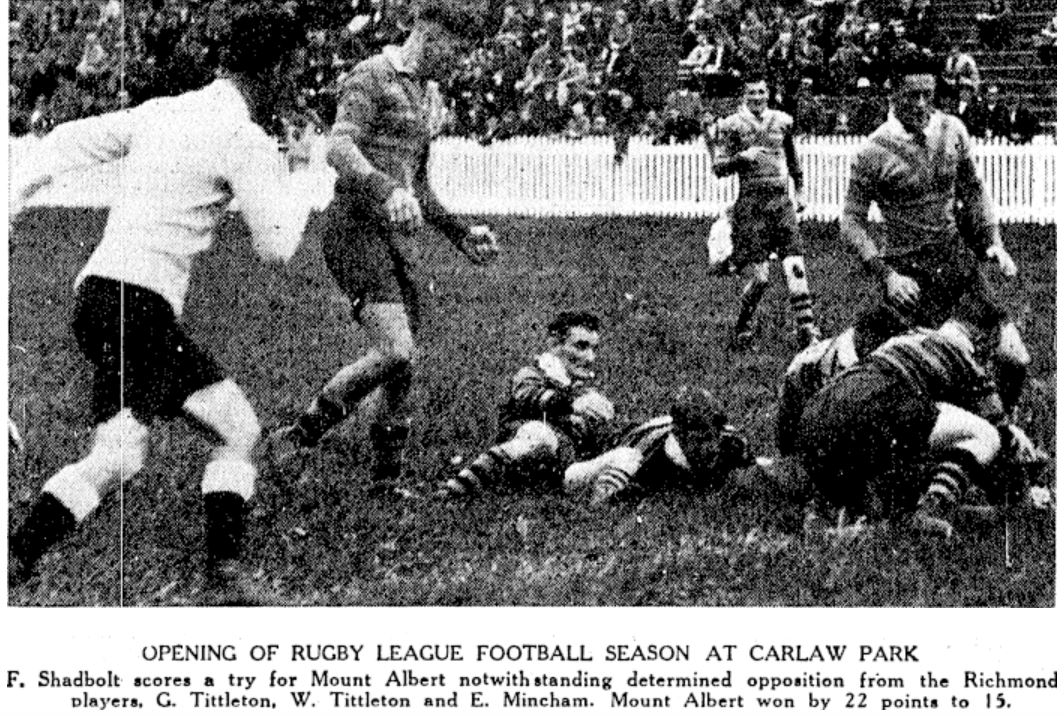

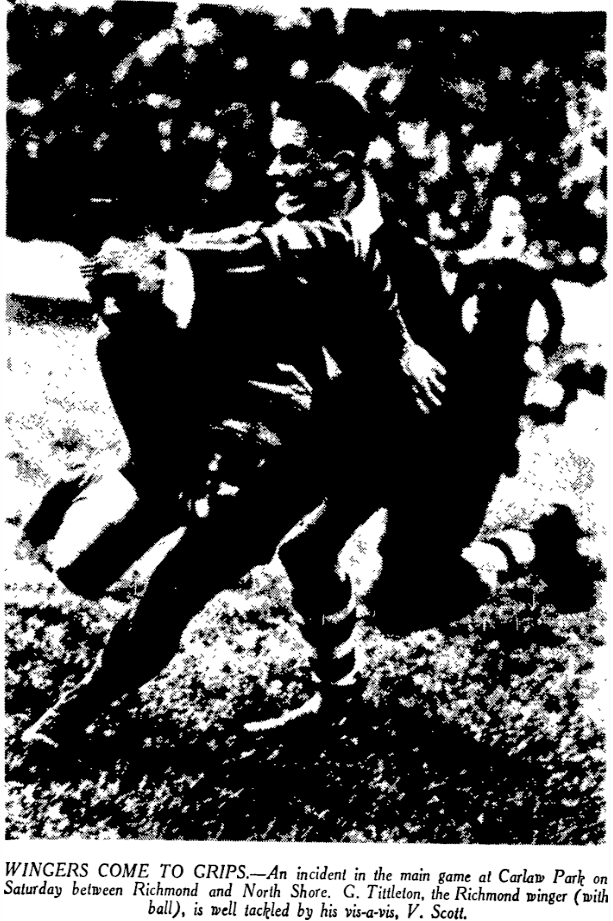
Tittleton being tackled by Verdun Scott of North Shore on May 1, 1937 at Carlaw Park.

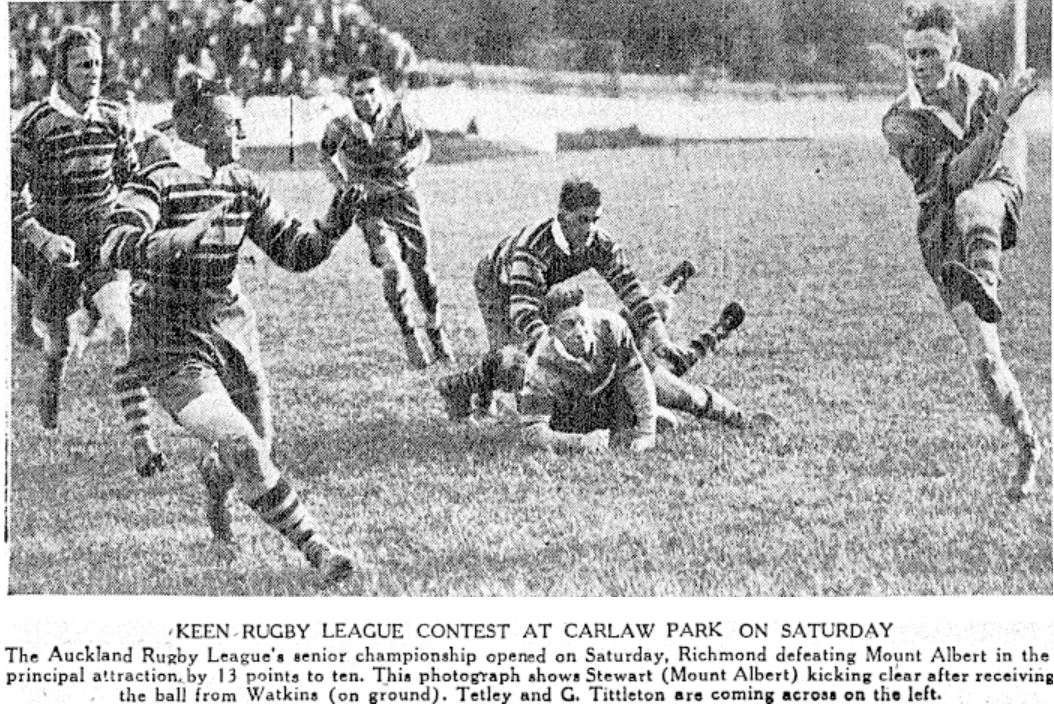
Tittleton coming across with his hands raised on May 1, 1937 in a game against Mt Albert.

Tittleton played for the Ngaruawahia Panthers and Taupriri, and represented South Auckland. In 1935 he played for Auckland Province against the touring Australian side. He played in three test matches for the New Zealand national rugby league team, one in 1935 against Australia and two in 1936 against Great Britain.

In 1936 Tittleton, along with his brother Wally, joined the Richmond club in the Auckland Rugby League. He finished playing seniors for them in 1938 but then in 1941 made two more appearances to help the side out as many players had gone off to the war effort.
