= Brian Riley (rugby league) =

New Zealand international rugby league footballer

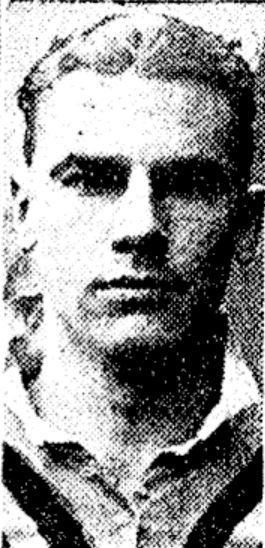

Personal information
- Born: 10 January 1915 New Zealand
- Died: 2 November 2000 (aged 85)

Playing information
- Weight: 11 st 0 lb (70 kg)
- Position: Centre
Club
Years	Team	Pld	T	G	FG	P
1933–43	Ponsonby United	115	55	0	0	165
Representative
Years	Team	Pld	T	G	FG	P
1934–43	Auckland	8	5	0	0	15
1935	Auckland B	2	1	0	0	3
1935–37	New Zealand	2	2	0	0	6
1935	Auckland Province	1	0	0	0	0
1938–41	Auckland Pakehā	3	3	0	0	9
1939	New Zealand Possibles (trial)	1	1	0	0	3
- Source: As of 29 August 2021

Brian Riley was a New Zealand international rugby league footballer.

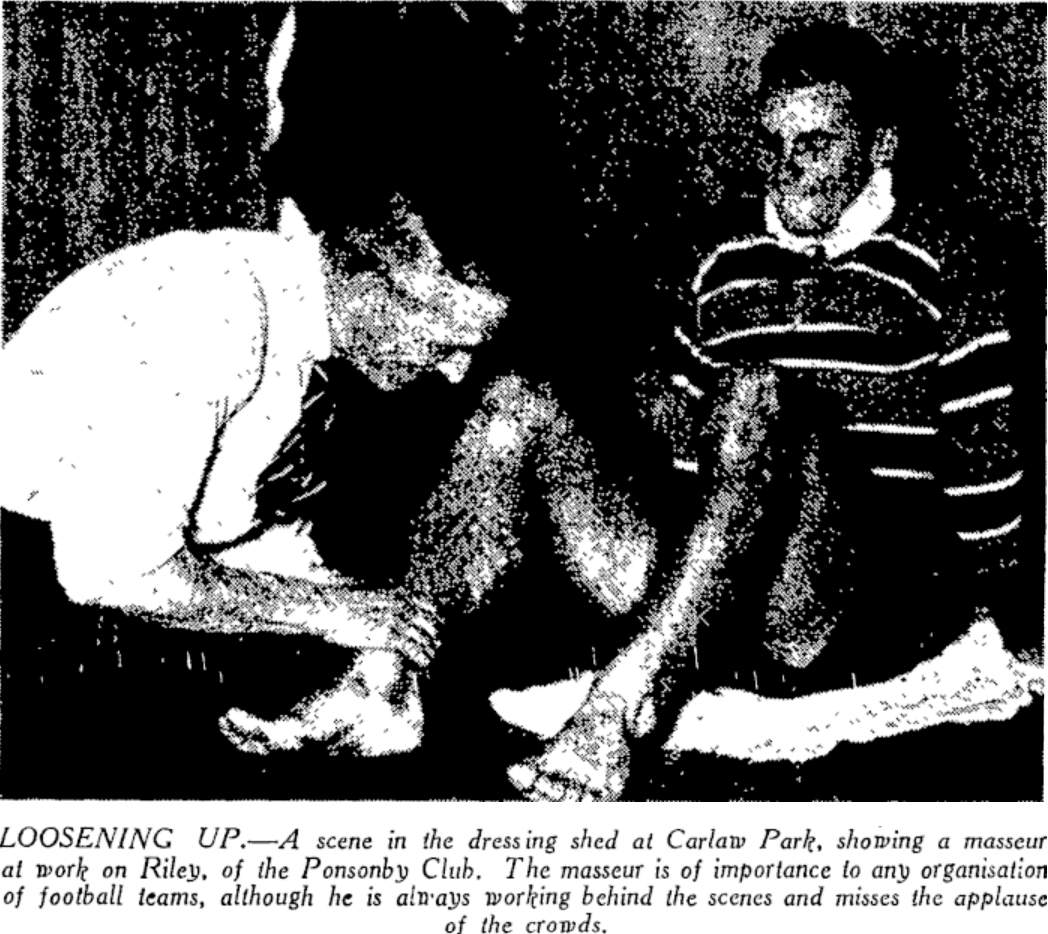
Brian Riley before a May 18, 1936 match against City.

He was born on 19 January 1915, to Elizabeth (1874-1928) and Oliver Nathaniel Riley (1871-1952). His older brother Lawrence Leonard Riley (known by Leonard though nicknamed 'Spot') played for Ponsonby United also, and was captain of the senior side. He was still playing when Brian debuted in 1933 at the age of 18 with Leonard aged 28. He also had an older sister, Rene Ruth Riley who was born in 1906. His first match for Ponsonby was against City Rovers at Carlaw Park on 1 July. Leonard had been selected to go on the New Zealand tour of Australia in 1930 but was unable to travel.

Riley was Ponsonby's second highest try scorer in their first three decades with 57 tries from 1933 to 1942, only behind Arthur Kay with 71.

== Personal life and death ==
Brian Riley married Valdora 'Val' Peace Matthews (1918-1999) and they had four sons, one of who was, Terrence William Riley (1945-2020).
