= Claude Dempsey =

New Zealand international rugby league footballer

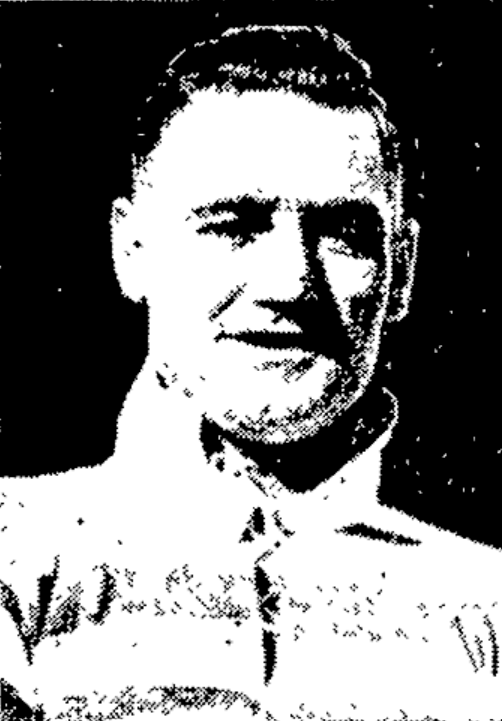

Personal information
- Full name: Claude Edward Dempsey
- Born: 13 May, 1909 Auckland, New Zealand
- Died: 19 August, 1971 Auckland, New Zealand

Playing information
- Weight: 67 kg (10 st 8 lb)
- Position: Fullback
Club
| Years | Team | Pld | T | G | FG | P |
|---|---|---|---|---|---|---|
| 1930–40 | Newton Rangers (ARL) | 169 | 5 | 65 | 1 | 150 |
Representative
| Years | Team | Pld | T | G | FG | P |
| 1932–39 | Auckland | 10 | 0 | 2 | 0 | 4 |
| 1935 | Auckland B | 1 | 0 | 1 | 0 | 2 |
| 1935 | Auckland A | 1 | 0 | 0 | 0 | 0 |
| 1935 | Auckland Province | 1 | 0 | 0 | 0 | 0 |
| 1936 | North Island | 1 | 0 | 0 | 0 | 0 |
| 1936 | New Zealand | 1 | 0 | 0 | 0 | 0 |
| 1939–40 | Auckland Pakehā | 2 | 0 | 1 | 0 | 2 |

Claude Dempsey was a New Zealand rugby league player who represented New Zealand.

== Playing career ==
Dempsey played in the Auckland Rugby League competition at Fullback. An Auckland representative, Dempsey played for New Zealand in one Test, starting at Fullback against the touring England team on 15 August 1936.

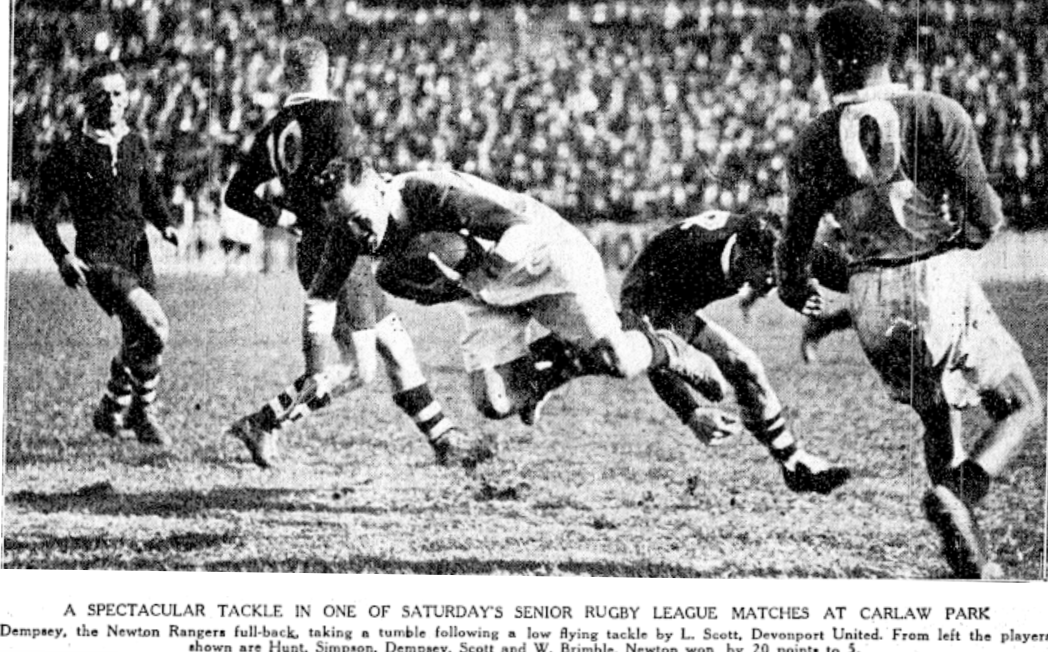
Dempsey being tackled in a match for Newton Rangers against Devonport United in May, 1935.
