= Jim Calder (rugby league) =

New Zealand international rugby league footballer

Personal information
- Full name: William James Calder
- Born: 12 November 1906; New Zealand
- Died: 28 February 1971 (aged 64)

Playing information
- Weight: 13 st 7 lb (86 kg)
- Position: Prop
Club
Years	Team	Pld	T	G	FG	P
	Unknown (WCRL)
Representative
Years	Team	Pld	T	G	FG	P
	West Coast
1929–36	South Island
1930–36	New Zealand	8	0	0	0	0
- Relatives: Brendon Pongia (grandson); Quentin Pongia (grandson)

William James Calder was a New Zealand rugby league footballer who represented New Zealand. His grandson, Quentin Pongia, also played for New Zealand.

== Playing career ==
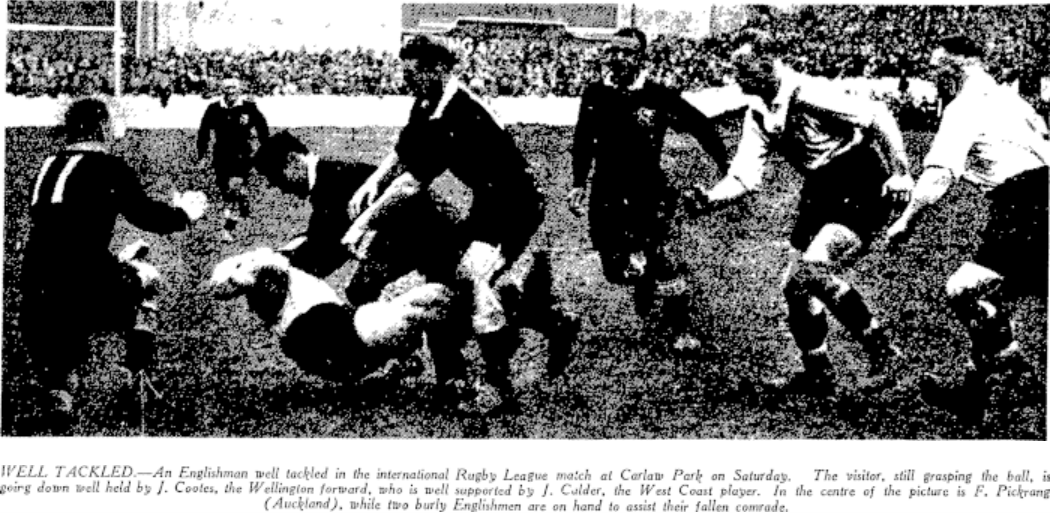
Calder in support of Joe Cootes in the first test against England, August 1, 1936.

Calder first played in the West Coast Rugby League competition and represented the West Coast and the South Island. He made his debut for New Zealand in 1930 and played in his first test match in 1932. Calder went on to play in eight test matches for New Zealand.
