= Harold Tetley =

NZ international rugby league footballer and coach

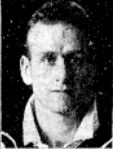

Personal information
- Full name: Harold Gill Tetley
- Born: 26 July 1907 Pukekohe, New Zealand
- Died: 1 April 1987 (aged 79)

Playing information
- Weight: 12 st 1 lb (77 kg)

Rugby union
Club
Years	Team	Pld	T	G	FG	P
1931–33	Ponsonby RFC	28	1	0	0	3
Representative
Years	Team	Pld	T	G	FG	P
1931	Auckland B	1	0	0	0	0

Rugby league
- Position: Prop, Second-row, Loose forward
Club
Years	Team	Pld	T	G	FG	P
1934–38	Richmond	64	22	0	0	66
Representative
Years	Team	Pld	T	G	FG	P
1935	Auckland B	1	1	0	0	3
1935–36	Auckland	6	2	0	0	6
1935–38	New Zealand	4	0	0	0	0

Coaching information
Representative
Years	Team	Gms	W	D	L	W%
1940	Richmond Rovers	22	15	2	5	68
1955–56	New Zealand	6	2	0	4	33

Harold Gill Tetley (26 July 1907 – 1 April 1987) was a New Zealand rugby league player and coach who represented New Zealand.

== Playing career ==
Tetley played for the Richmond Rovers in the Auckland Rugby League competition. Tetley represented Auckland City and Auckland Province, captaining Auckland City in 1936. He played for New Zealand in four Test matches between 1935 and 1938. Tetley was made New Zealand captain in 1937 for the second Test match against Australia.

== Coaching career ==
Tetley coached the Kiwis on the 1955-56 tour of Great Britain and France.
