= Arthur Kay (rugby league) =

New Zealand international rugby league footballer (1914-1999)

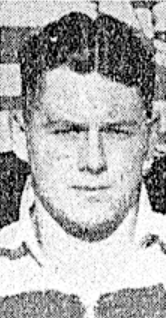

Personal information
- Full name: Arthur Greig Kay
- Born: 19 July 1914 Auckland, New Zealand
- Died: 27 September 1999 (aged 85)

Playing information
- Weight: 11 st 12 lb (75 kg)
- Position: Centre, Stand-off
Club
Years	Team	Pld	T	G	FG	P
1933–45	Ponsonby United	181	78	149	0	532
1947	Mount Albert United
	Total	181	78	149	0	532
Representative
Years	Team	Pld	T	G	FG	P
1934–43	Auckland	13	9	0	0	27
1935	Auckland A	1	0	0	0	0
1935–39	New Zealand	11 (6)	4 (1)	0	0	12 (3)
1935	Auckland Province	1	0	0	0	0
1936	Auckland B	1	0	0	0	0
1939–42	Auckland Pakehā	5	5	3	2	25
1939–1945	North Island	2	0	0	0	0

Coaching information
Representative
Years	Team	Gms	W	D	L	W%
1944	Ponsonby United	24	14	2	8	58
1951	Point Chevalier	18	10	0	8	56
- Source: NZ Herald and Auckland Star (Papers Past)

Arthur Greig Kay was a New Zealand rugby league footballer who represented New Zealand.

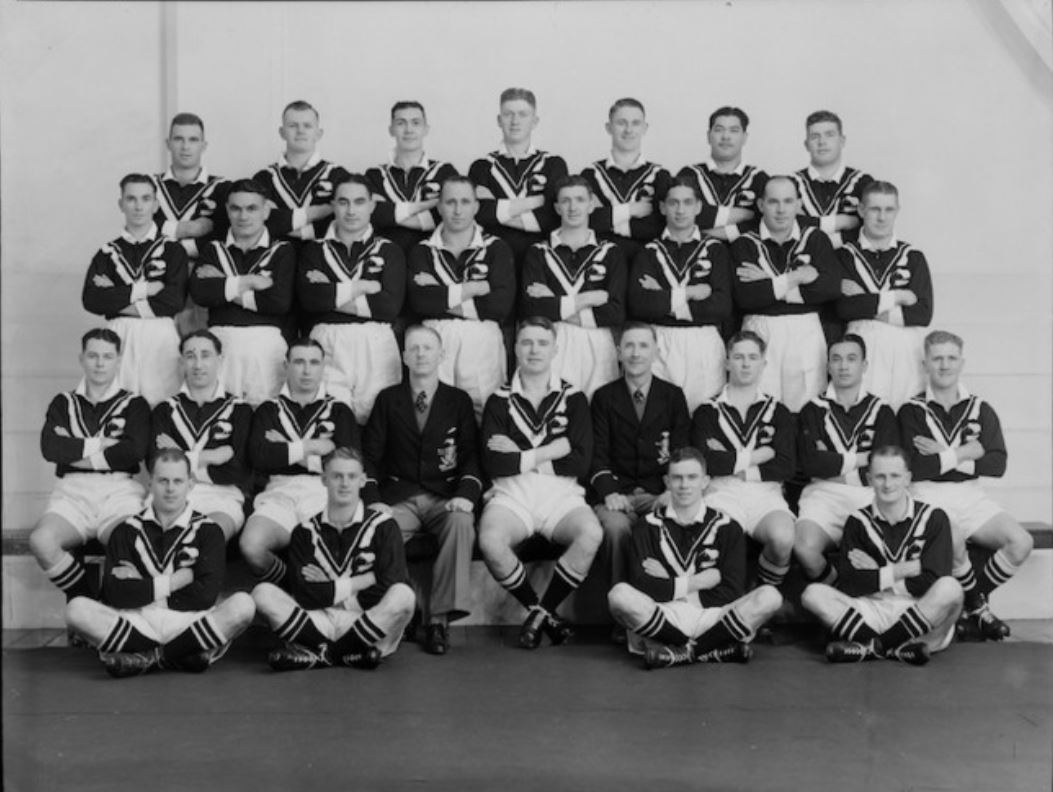
Kay, seated on the floor in the front on the left.

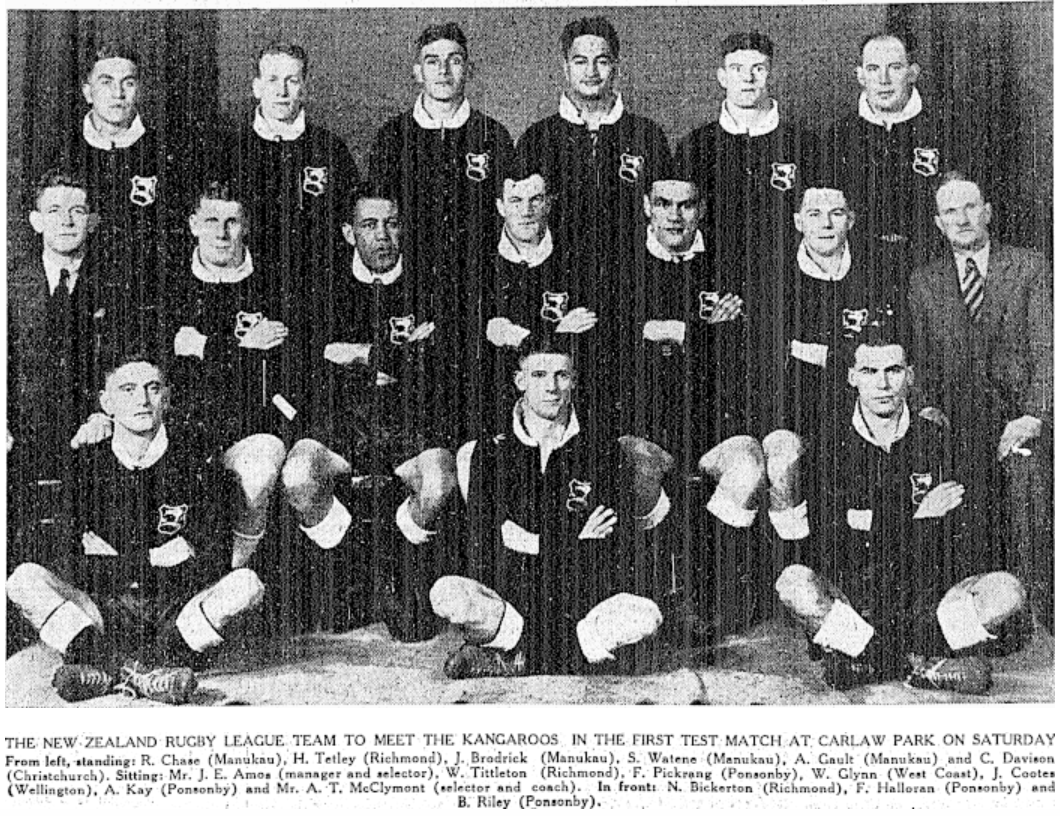

Kay represented Auckland and was first selected to play for New Zealand in 1935. He played in all three test matches against the touring Australian side.

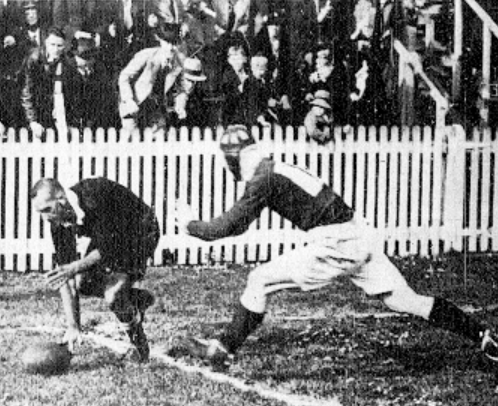
Kay scoring for New Zealand in the 1st test win over Australia in 1935.

In 1936 he played in two matches against the touring Great Britain team and played in his final test match in New Zealand's 16-15 victory over Australia at Carlaw Park on 14 August 1937. He was selected to tour Great Britain and France in 1939 but the tour was abandoned due to the outbreak of World War II.

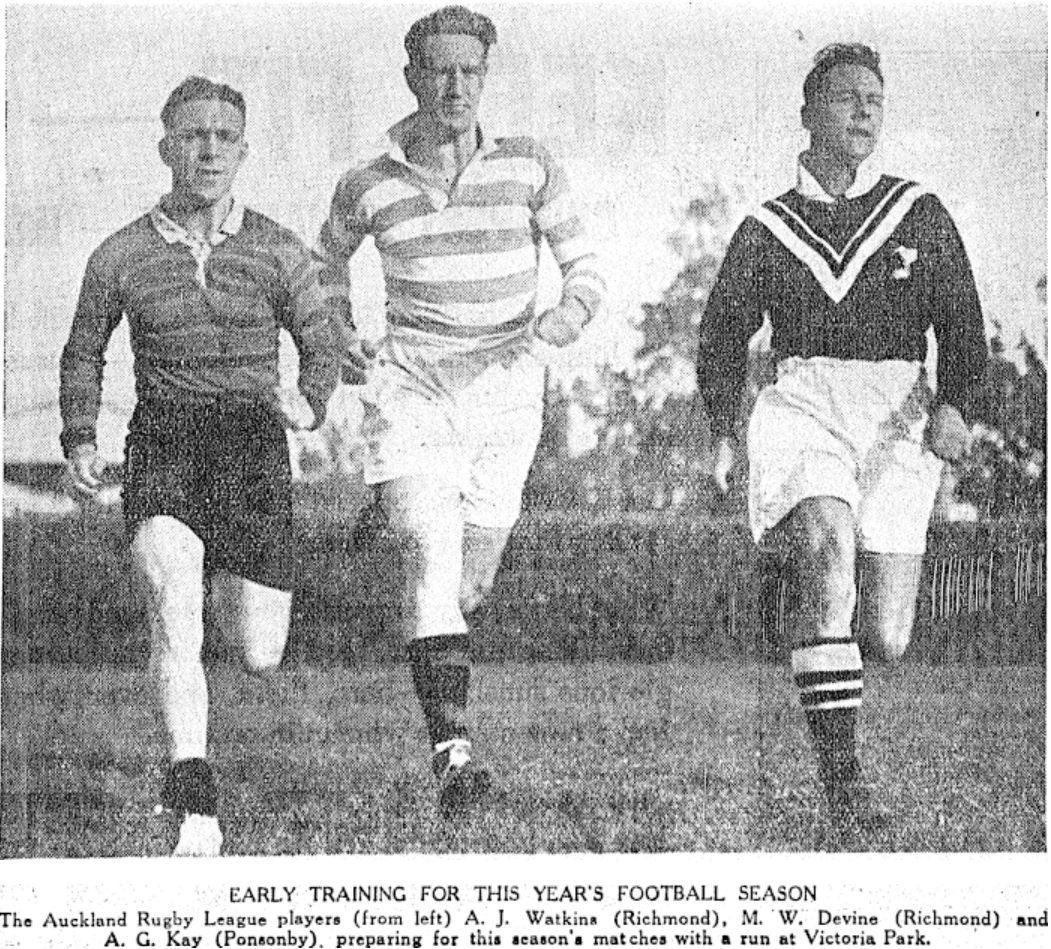
Arthur Kay training in pre-season in 1939 along with Alan Watkins (Mt Albert), and Merv Devine (Richmond).

In 1944 Kay coached the Ponsonby side, but mid-season, due to the team struggling somewhat, he came out of retirement and was a key part of them winning the majority of their remaining games, including 3 Roope Rooster matches to claim the knockout trophy before a loss to City in the Stormont Shield championship match.

In 1951 Kay coached the Point Chevalier senior side. They finished the championship with a 6 win, 8 loss record, but then, in the Roope Rooster, they beat Richmond 9-8, Ponsonby 12-3, and Northcote in the final 8-6. Two weeks later they defeated Richmond 18-13 to win the Stormont Shield. Over that fortnight it gave Point Chevalier their first two major titles in Auckland Rugby League.
