= Roy Powell (New Zealand rugby league) =

New Zealand international rugby league player

Personal information
- Full name: Royden Samuel Henry Powell
- Born: 8 September 1907 Grey Lynn, Auckland, New Zealand
- Died: 2 April 1980 (aged 72) Papatoetoe, Auckland, New Zealand

Playing information
- Weight: 9 st 5 lb (59 kg)
- Position: Halfback
Club
Years	Team	Pld	T	G	FG	P
1932–39	Richmond Rovers	114	21	0	0	63
Representative
Years	Team	Pld	T	G	FG	P
1934–37	Auckland	8	1	0	0	3
1934–35	North Island	2	1	0	0	3
1935–36	New Zealand	4 (4)	0	0	0	0
1936	A Team (Auckland Trial)	1	0	0	0	0
- Source: As of 9 September 2021

Roy Powell was a rugby league player who represented New Zealand in four test matches in 1935 and 1936 against Australia (2), and England (2) at halfback. In the process he became the 230th player to represent New Zealand. He also played rugby league for the North Island and Auckland representative sides as well as spending 16 years playing for Richmond Rovers including 8 in the senior side.

== Early life ==
Roy Powell was recorded as "Samuel Royden Henry Powell" on his birth records when he was born on 8 September 1908. His parents were Mabel Powell and Samuel Powell. His mother Mabel had previously been married to John Mulhern and they had 6 children together before John's death. They were Horace John Mulhern (b.1891), Henry James Mulhern (b.1893), Ivy May Mulhern (1895), Irene Maude Mulhern (b.1896), Elsie Winifred Jane Mulhern (b.1898), and Reginald Frank Mulhern (b.1899). Henry died on 12 October 1893 aged just one month.

After John's death Mabel remarried Samuel Powell and at some point Mabel moved from the North Shore suburb of Northcote to Grey Lynn across the Waitematā Harbour. They had Roy in 1908 and a second son, Allan Frank Powell in 1909. Sadly Allan died on 19 April 1911 aged just 1 year and 5 months old. Further tragedy was to strike the family in 1916 when the eldest son, Horace John Mulhern was killed at the Somme on 2 July whilst fighting in World War 1. He was aged just 24 at the time and was buried at the Cite Bonjean Military Cemetery, Armentières in France. For several years after his death the family would have 'In memoriam' notices published including one on 4 July 1921 which read in part "Dear Jack, you are ever remembered and sadly missed. Inserted by his loving mother and step father, S. and M. Powell and little Roy, of Grey Lynn".

== Playing career ==
=== Richmond Rovers juniors ===
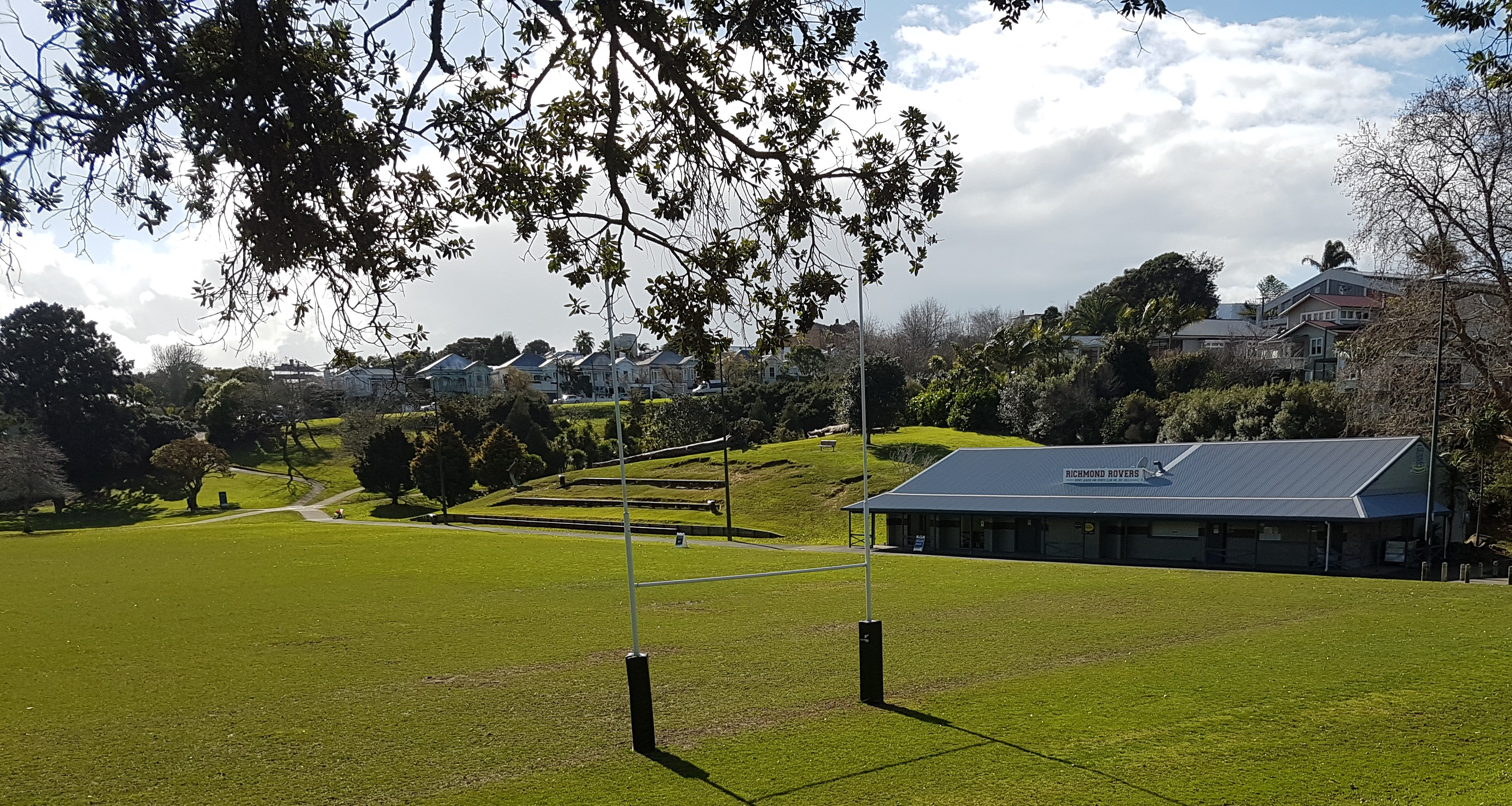
Richmond Rovers RL club and grounds where Roy Powell played as a junior and senior.

Roy Powell grey up in the Grey Lynn area and began playing for Richmond Rovers as a junior around 1924 aged 16 in the 6th grade. He was most likely playing in the midfield based on where he was being listed in the team line ups. Earlier in the year Roy had lost yet another brother, Reginald who died by suicide on the East Cape in July aged 24. He was working as a sawmill hand at the time though his name was erroneously reported at Reginald "Malone" at the time. He was buried Motu Cemetery on 22 July.

Roy continued to play for Richmond juniors right through the remainder of the 1920s. In 1925 and 1926 he was still in the 6th grade A side before progressing to the 5th grade later in the season. In 1927 he had progressed to the 4th grade and then the 3rd grade intermediate section the following year. In 1929 aged 21 he started the year in the 3rd grade open side and the following season was promoted to the ranks of the 2nd grade. Then in 1931 he was part of the newly formed reserve grade competition once again in the Richmond jersey with the side coming 3rd. They did however win the Stallard Cup for the reserve grade knockout competition, defeating City Rovers reserves 13–5 in the final. Powell was briefly mentioned in a report of the match as having "given better full-back displays for the maroons".

=== Richmond seniors ===
At the start of the 1932 season Powell would have been 26 years old and he still began the season most likely in the reserve grade side. But on 11 June he was mentioned in a match report for the senior side against Marist Old Boys. It was said that "Powell put Richmond on the offensive with a well judged line kick…" though Richmond went down 21–13 in the match played at Carlaw Park. It was likely that he was debuting at full-back in place of Valentine who had been there in previous weeks as the rest of the backline was Reece Marshall (wing), Harry Johns (centre), Drew (wing), John Angelo (inside centre), Stehr (standoff), and C Reynolds (halfback). Against Devonport United the following week the Auckland Star said that he was "well in evidence" though Richmond again lost 13–5. Unfortunately the "good game" Powell was playing came to a premature end when he was forced to retire with an injury. The match was played in heavy rain and the main field at Carlaw Park was turning to mud before Powell collided with the fence. Powell was fit to play the following weekend however and turned out in their match against City Rovers before spending a week back in the reserve grade. His final match of the season was back in the top side though Richmond were knocked out of the Roope Rooster by City thus ending his and Richmond's season.

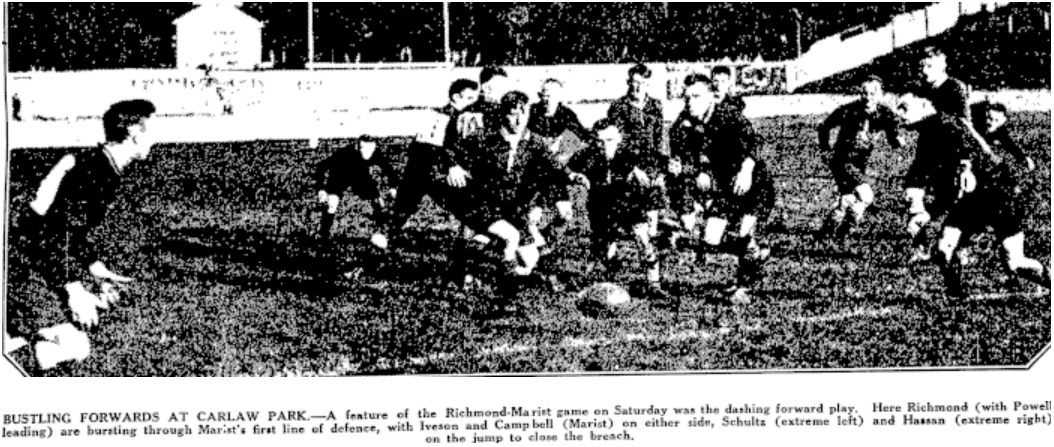
Powell in the centre moving to the ball in a match for Richmond v Marist at Carlaw Park in 1933.

The 1933 season saw Powell become fully established in the senior Richmond side. He played 19 matches and scored 5 tries. He spent the first half of the season playing in the loose forwards at lock as a 'rover'. His first try was in a round 5 match against Marist when he "dashed over for a good try" from a scrum. Against Newton the following weekend it was said he "played a fine game for Richmond. Not much over 9st. (59 kg), Powell was in the thick of the play all afternoon". The following week in a resounding 32–12 win over Ponsonby United the Auckland Star reported that "with Telford, J Hawkes, [Tony] Milicich, Satherley, and Powell, Richmond has forwards of calibre, Powell revealing cleverness as a breakaway". Despite his good play in the forwards however he began playing in the halfback position mid season and was there when Richmond won the Roope Rooster final against City on 19 August. They won 26–16 at Carlaw Park. Against Devonport in their 12–7 Stormont Shield loss Powell was singled out in The New Zealand Herald which said "Powell was easily the best Richmond back. His play at halfback was brilliant at times". On 27 October Richmond were given the opportunity to test themselves against Australian opposition with St. George (New South Wales runners up), touring the upper North Island. Richmond won 13 points to 8 at Carlaw Park with "Prentice, Powell and Mitchell… the outstanding backs for Richmond". Powell was again on the victorious Richmond side when they defeated St. George again on 14 October by 5 points to 3.

=== Auckland and North Island selection ===
The 1934 season began on an interesting note for Powell. Shortly before the season he lost the "joint of a finger" in a "motor accident". The year for Richmond was to be somewhat of an historic one. They were only defeated twice in the season, both in the championship on their way to their first ever Fox Memorial title. They also won the Roope Rooster knockout competition and Stormont Shield awarded to the champion of champions, becoming the first ever club to do this. Then at the end of the season they defeated the Western Suburbs side who were New South Wales Rugby League champions. Powell played a prominent part throughout and earned a place in the Auckland and North Island sides. In Richmond's first game of the season he was said to have done "a lot of useful work behind the scrum" in an 18–7 win over Newton Rangers. After a win over Devonport The New Zealand Herald said that "an outstanding game was played by Powell, the Richmond halfback. His all-round play meant a great deal to Richmond and he was responsible for the team's only try through a clever movement from the scrum. Powell has been playing very sound football all the season and must come into consideration for the representative honours". In a 20–8 win over Marist he "played another fine game at halfback, being directly responsible for the try scored by [Ralph] Jenkinson through clever play from the scrum". It was also said that "besides improving on attack, Powell does a lot of defensive work, which repeatedly gets his side out of trouble. On present form there should be no doubt about his inclusion as representative half".

On 20 June he was selected as part of the Auckland training squad to practice towards the match with Taranaki. Then on 25 June the selectors Bert Avery, W. Mincham, and Ernie Asher chose him to play in the match with Richmond teammates Bert Cooke and Stan Prentice outside him in the five-eighths positions.

The match was played on 30 June at Carlaw Park with Auckland winning 35–8. The Auckland Star said that "he lived up to his reputation at half-back". Then after 2 more club matches Powell was nominated by Auckland Rugby League for the North Island team to play the South Island. He went with Richmond on their tour to Taranaki and Hawke's Bay where they played the local representative sides on 9 and 11 August respectively. They lost to Taranaki 23–22 before beating Hawke's Bay 37–11. Upon his return to Auckland he played Devonport and the Herald said that "another fine game was played by Powell, who has improved considerably during the season and is developing into a fine all-round player".

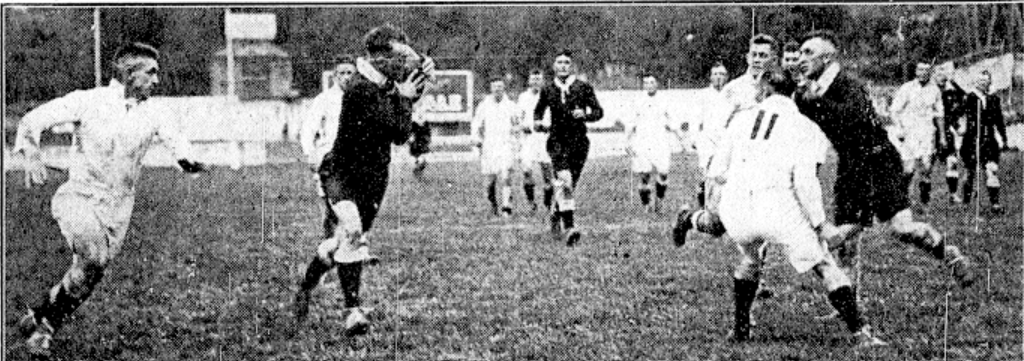
Powell throwing a pass to Stan Prentice in the North Island's win over the South Island.

A fortnight later after a Roope Rooster semi final win over Ponsonby United, Powell was picked in the North Island side to play the South Island. Alongside him again would be Cooke and Prentice. The match was played on 1 September at Carlaw Park and before a crowd of 9,000 the North Island side won 36–18. It was said that "Powell was great behind the Northern pack, and right from the opening of the game he made repeated gaps in the opposing lines, and on occasion ran a trifle too far before parting with the ball".

On 9 September Richmond defeated Marist 20–13 to win the Roope Rooster for the fourth time with Powell playing well. He was then named in the Auckland team to play South Auckland (Waikato). Thomas McClymont was coaching the side and they won 35–16 at Carlaw Park on 15 September with Powell in "good form".

Powell then finished the season with 3 big matches for Richmond. They played the 1934 New South Wales champions Western Suburbs twice recording 18–16 and 10–3 wins before crowds of 15,000 and 13,000 respectively. Powell scored a try in the first win when the scores were level 13–13 after he "dashed away from the scrum, and, catching his opponents on the wrong foot, crossed the line and darted around near the goal-posts". The Herald reported said that he was "the most improved player in the code in Auckland. He has shown great promise for the past two seasons and was always very solid on defence. He is now very clever on attack and scored a fine try against Western Suburbs… on present form he bids fair to rival the best halfbacks of the past". Powell then capped his season as part of the Richmond, 21–5 Stormont Shield win over Newton.

=== New Zealand debut v Australia ===
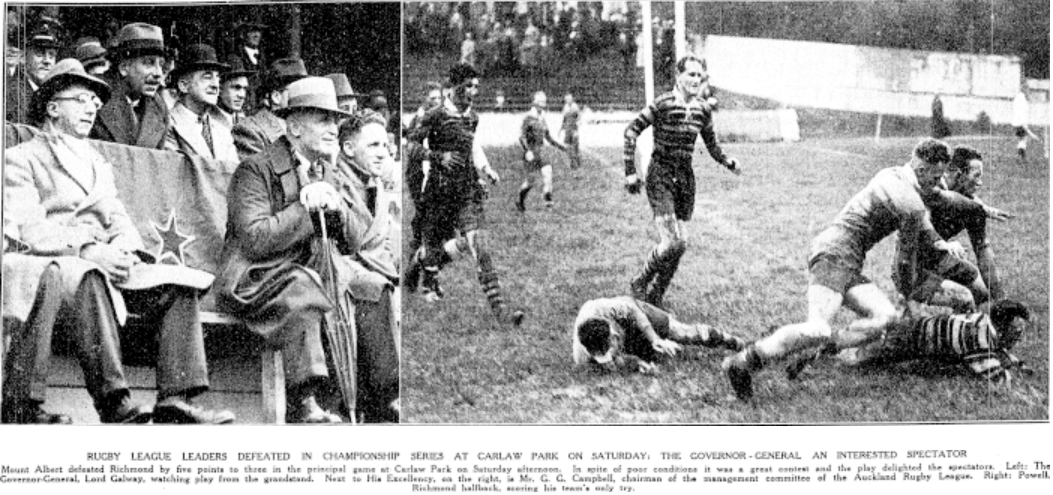
Powell scoring for Richmond against Mount Albert on June 22 at Carlaw Park.

Powell played 18 games for Richmond in 1935, scoring 4 tries. Reports of him early in the season were critical saying that he was holding on to the ball too long and being caught with it. After round 4 against Ponsonby it was reported that he "showed improvement, but his play was not up to that of last season". By round 10 following a match against Marist it was said that "Powell was in top-hole form behind the scrum, deftly getting the ball away to Stan Prentice". He was then chosen for the Auckland side to play Taranaki. He scored a try in a 37–14 win at Carlaw Park though he reportedly "did not show his best form". Despite this he was picked for the North Island to play the South Island. Then days later on 10 August he scored a "very fine solo try from a scrum ten yards out [after he] caught the Mount Albert backs hopelessly out of position" in the Fox Memorial championship final. Richmond won the match 14 to 9.

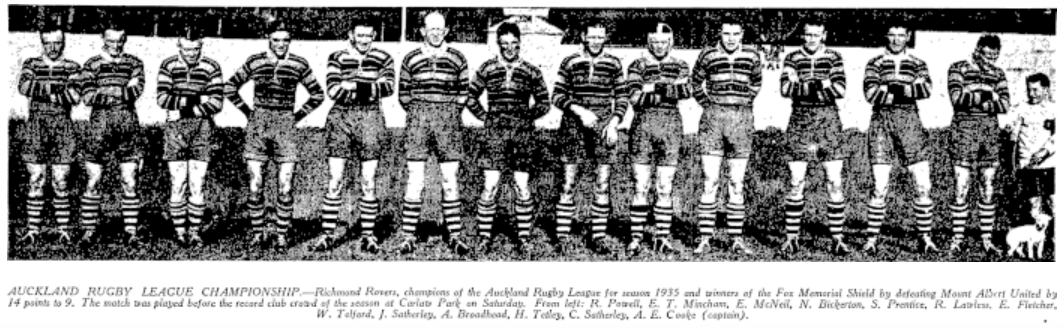

In the match for the North Island he scored a try in their 19–18 win though he was said to have "played better games". His try came after he "chimed in twice to a North Island passing rush and finally scored wide out". Powell was then chosen to train as part of a group of Auckland players who were not going on their southern tour to play Canterbury and Wellington. On 14 September he played in Richmond's 26–15 Stormont Shield win over Newton. Richmond had qualified for the game by winning the Fox Memorial championship for the second straight time. Powell was picked in the Auckland side at half back to play the touring Australia team after Wilf Hassan was troubled by a knee injury during Auckland's matches in the south. On 21 September Auckland went down 16–8 before a crowd of 15,000 at Carlaw Park. Auckland had put up a good showing against a strong side and Powell "did his duty satisfactorily" behind a "sextet that was beaten for the ball".

Immediately after the match for Auckland, the New Zealand team to play the first test against Australia was chosen. Powell was selected at half back with Stan Prentice and Arthur Kay outside him in the five eighths positions. The match was played at Carlaw Park and saw New Zealand with an upset victory by 22 points to 14. Powell was playing opposite Australian halfback Viv Thicknesse and "defended well but had few chances on attack". He was chosen to play half back again for the second test which was also at Carlaw Park. New Zealand were heavily beaten by 29 points to 8. Powell was a casualty of the loss with seven personnel changes in total, and was replaced at half back by Richmond teammate Eric Fletcher for the third test which New Zealand lost comprehensively again 31 to 8.

=== New Zealand v England ===
The 1936 season saw Powell make 19 appearances for Richmond. After 6 rounds of the Fox Memorial the Herald reported Powell was the best half back in Auckland along with Frank Halloran of Ponsonby, however [Powell] has proved sturdy on defence, and this may be the deciding factor in his favour when the final Auckland team is chosen". On 23 June he played for Auckland against the Auckland Māori (Tāmaki) side. The Māori team won 30–21. On 11 July he played in an Auckland trial which was the curtain-raiser to the annual North Island v South Island match. His 'A Team' went down 16–13 to the 'B Team'. Two weeks later Powell was chosen to play for Auckland against the touring England side. The match was played on 15 July before 14,000 spectators and Auckland fought well before going down 22–16 to a strong opponent. Powell was said to have been "starved" of the ball with Auckland losing the scrums (18–40) "but shaped well in a defensive role".

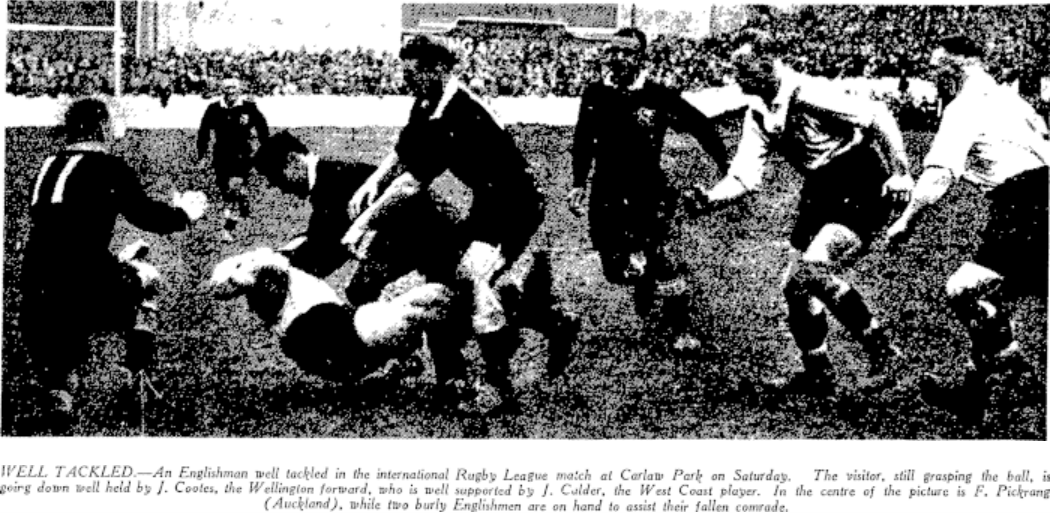
Powell in the background coming up to support his team mates.

Powell's performance was enough to convince the selectors (Bert Avery, Thomas McClymont, and Jim Amos) to choose him to play in the first test at Carlaw Park. It was said his selection was justified as he was "the soundest all-round half-back". New Zealand went down narrowly by 10 points to 8 before a huge crowd of 25,000 with Powell playing opposite Billy Watkins. He was involved in an early attack but "was smothered when a try looked possible" after Frank Pickrang had broken away. He was then involved in a passing movement with Wally Tittleton and Lou Brown who was pushed into touch a few feet from the try line. Later in the match with the score 10–6 in favour of England Arthur Kay broke away to the halfway line and passed to Powell who was again "smothered" by Alec Troup. Then at the conclusion of the game, probably not knowing exactly how much time was left "from a set scrum right in front of England's goal Powell passed to Trevarthan, who kicked a neat field goal. The game ended immediately" with England holding on for a two-point victory.

Powell was then chosen for the second test which was played at the same venue a week later with it said "Powell is safe and sound in all departments at half-back, and he will open up the play if the ball is heeled to him". Once again the backs received few chances with the Auckland Star reporter saying that "the New Zealand wings had a starvation day as far as scoring chances went, and Mincham scarcely saw the ball, except in the distance". They went on to say that "Powell played resolutely at half-back, and gave his best" however New Zealand went down 23 to 11 with 17,000 watching on. At one point with New Zealand trailing 10–2 he "beat the defence, but [fullback] Belshaw saved with a fine tackle".

Powell then returned to club football and played 6 matches for Richmond before the season end. They were neck and neck with Manukau in the Fox Memorial championship before a loss to North Shore Albions in the penultimate round saw Manukau leap frog them into first place and they stayed there after a final round win. Richmond did however have the 'last laugh' when they beat Manukau to win the Stormont Shield on 3 October by 30 points to 9 to finish the club season in Auckland.

=== Richmond and Auckland ===
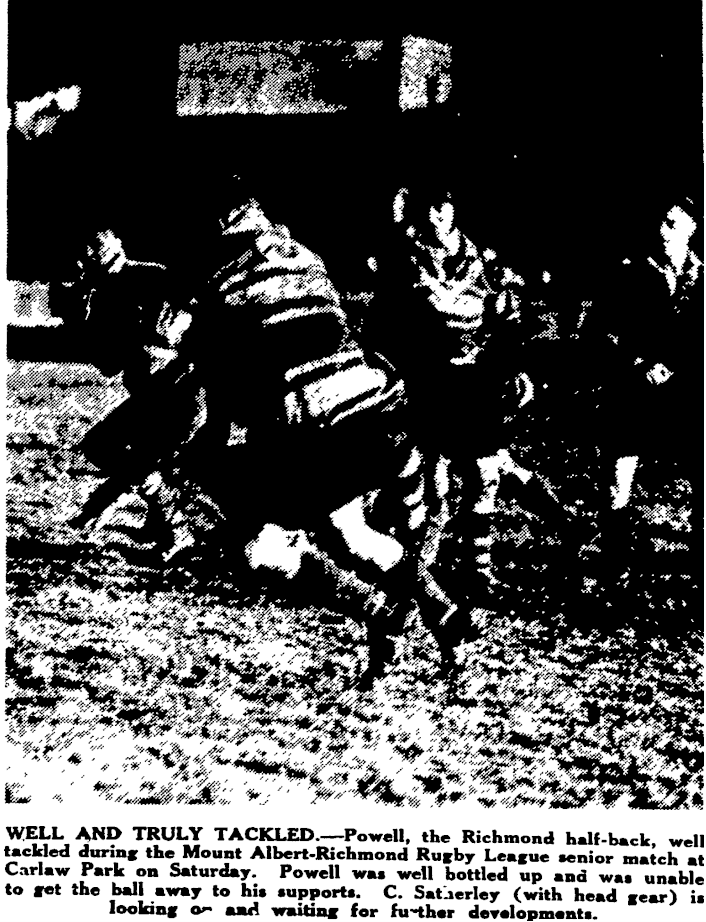
Powell being tackled in Richmond's 13-10 win over Mt Albert on May 1, 1937 at Carlaw Park.

In 1937 Powell played 19 matches for Richmond, scoring 3 tries. After 2 preseason games and 2 Fox Memorial games Powell was selected to play for Auckland against Auckland Māori (Tāmaki). The match was played midweek at Carlaw Park on 12 May and saw Auckland win 24–14. On 9 June in another midweek representative fixture Powell again turned out for Auckland in their match against Taranaki. Auckland won by 27 points to 10 with Powell playing "a sound game, but [he] lacked variety". With the Australian team due to tour later in the season Powell was chosen in a New Zealand trial match amongst the reserves, however on match day on 28 July he was not among the reserves with just William McCallum and Hawea Mataira listed. On 31 July Powell played in an 11–11 draw with a Manukau side who were the reigning champions. The New Zealand Herald said after the match that "Powell played easily his best game this season, and is a little unlucky to lose his place as the New Zealand halfback". On 28 August Richmond sealed another championship when they beat Newton Rangers 30–9 in the final round to claim their third title, with Powell having been at halfback through them all. Five weeks later Powell's season finished with a 12–5 loss to Marist Old Boys in the Stormont Shield final with Powell scoring Richmond's only try after he "dived through the ruck to score". He was the "pick of the backs" along with Noel Bickerton and Ted Mincham.

=== Final season for Richmond and retirement ===
The 1938 season was to be Powell's last season of rugby league. He played 17 games and scored 3 tries as Richmond could only manage 5th in the Fox Memorial competition. They did however lift the Stormont Shield though Powell was not part of the side as he had stopped playing following their 6 August match against Marist in the penultimate round of the Fox Memorial. Perhaps fittingly he played halfback in the match after spending much of the season in other positions. He had been moved to fullback from round 2 until round 5 after A. Watkins had taken up the halfback position. The Herald said after round 4 that Richmond was "having difficulty with the fullback position. Powell, halfback last season, was tried, but he did not fill the role with the same success as that he enjoyed behind the scrum". Following their round 5 game with Marist he was said to have "played a sound game at fullback and placed his kicks with good judgment". Then the following week Powell was moved to standoff for their match with Manukau where he remained for 7 matches before shifting to fullback for a match before his final game at halfback.

Powell had obviously retired late in the 1938 season missing their final 6 games however he made one more appearance for Richmond in round 3 in 1939. Several teams had been hit hard by influenza and so he turned out at halfback with Watkins are standoff. The Auckland Star said that Powell "behind the scrum, distinguished himself by playing the best game amongst the Richmond backs".

In August 1941 Powell was chosen in a "Patriotic Contest" in a match between the "All Golds" and South Auckland. The sides were composed of past New Zealand and South Auckland representative players with Powell at halfback. Later in the same year he was chosen in a team "to represent the New Zealand Rugby League Old Boys' Association" in a match with South Auckland.

== Personal life and death ==
Roy Powell married Joyce Caroline Bryant on 27 July 1935. Roy was working as a cabinet maker at the time of his marriage when he was living at 2 Sussex Street in Grey Lynn with his parents. His father Samuel has his occupation listed as a seaman. The married couple lived at 18 Warwick Avenue in Westmere, a neighbouring suburb to Grey Lynn with that being Joyce Powell's listed address on the 1935 electoral roll.

Roy and Joyce had a daughter in 1936 who later married Barrington John Lereculey. Joyce died on 27 September 1960.

Roy died on 2 April 1980 aged 71. He had been working as a machinist prior to his retirement and was living at 32 Hoteo Avenue in Papatoetoe, Auckland. He was cremated at Purewa Cemetery with his ashes returned and then buried on the "Protestant Lawn" at Waikumete Cemetery.
