= Alf Mitchell (rugby league) =

New Zealand Rugby league player

Personal information
- Full name: Alfred Derwent Mitchell
- Born: 2 April 1910 Ha’apai, Tonga
- Died: 28 February 1974 (aged 63) Wellington, New Zealand

Playing information
- Position: Wing, Centre
Club
Years	Team	Pld	T	G	FG	P
1933–36	Richmond Rovers	34	16	0	0	48
1936	Newton Rangers	1	0	0	0	0
	Total	35	16	0	0	48
Representative
Years	Team	Pld	T	G	FG	P
1935	New Zealand	1	0	0	0	0
1935	Auckland Province	1	0	0	0	0

Alfred Derwent Mitchell (2 April 1910 – 28 February 1974) was a rugby league player. He represented the New Zealand rugby league team in 1 test against Australia in 1935. In the process he became the 238th player to represent New Zealand. Mitchell also played one match for Auckland Province in 1935. He played for the Richmond Rovers club in the Auckland Rugby League competition from 1933 to 1936. Mitchell enlisted in the New Zealand military and fought in World War 2.

== Early life ==
Alfred Derwent Mitchell was born in Haʻapai, Tonga on April 2, 1910. His mother was Samoan born Mele Mataele (Mitchell). His father was Ernest Hamilton Rea Mitchell. Ernest was born in Litherland, Merseyside, England and had been traveling the Pacific Islands when he met Mele. They had several children, including Ernest, Jane Eusenia Mitchell, Evelyn Jane Violet Mitchell, Sarah Evelyn Thompson, Agnes Catherine Bouchier, Caroline Beatrice Taripo, Robert Edward Mitchell, Henry Hamilton Mitchell, Dugald Trevor Mitchell, Alfred, and George Gordon Mitchell. The children were born in a variety of islands, including Samoa, Tonga, and the Cook Islands.

Dugald, who was born in 1907 died aged just 1 in 1908. The eldest son, Ernest was killed on September 24, 1916 in World War I at the Somme when most of his siblings were very young. Ernest had been educated at Auckland Grammar School. Youngest son, George, like Alfred would go on to represent New Zealand at rugby league in the late 1930s.

In 1928 Alfred was sent to study at Feilding Agricultural High School near Palmerston North. That same year he equaled the high school record for the 220 yards senior championship with a time of 25 seconds.

== Playing career ==
=== Navy rugby side ===
At some point in the early 1930s Mitchell moved to Auckland and is likely to have begun working in the Naval Dockyards. He played for the Royal Naval Volunteer Reserves junior rugby side in 1932 against the Royal Navy junior side. It was their annual match with Mitchell named at fullback.

=== Richmond Rovers rugby league club ===
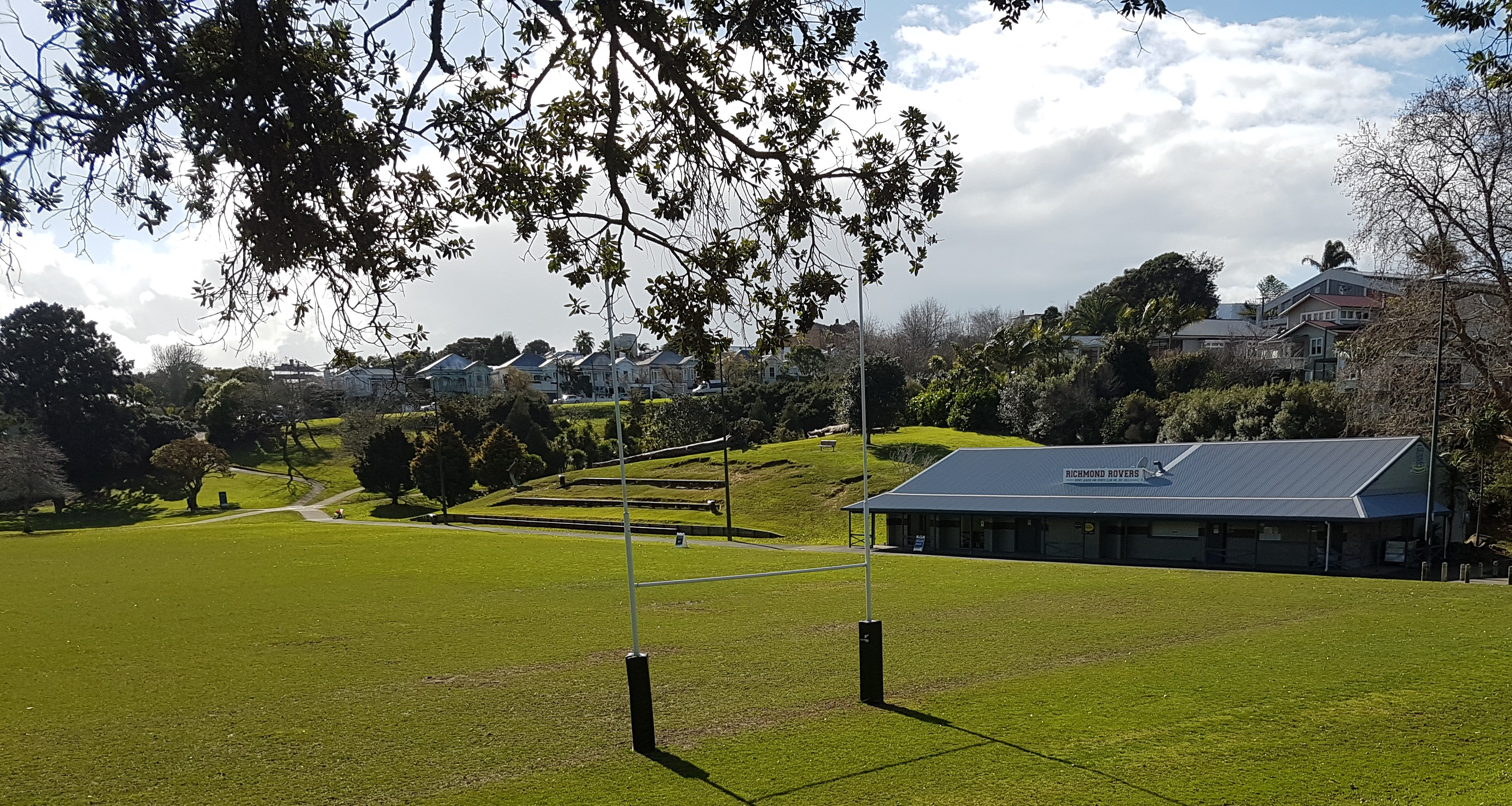
The Richmond Rovers club rooms on their home ground of Grey Lynn Park in Grey Lynn.

On April 19, 1933 he registered with the Richmond Rovers rugby league club. It was stated in his registration that he was living in Sandringham at the time. He was aged 23 by this time and made his debut in round 1 of the Fox Memorial Shield competition which was and still is Auckland Rugby League's premier club competition. The match was played on the main field at Carlaw Park and saw their opponents, Newton Rangers win 25-11. Mitchell played at centre but had an inauspicious start to his rugby league career when he was knocked out. The “three-quarter line was operating prettily up to the time of the unfortunate accident to Mitchell”. The New Zealand Herald reported that “Cameron and Mitchell were injured in a collision and the last-named, who had been playing well, was unable to resume”. It was later reported that he had been taken to Auckland Hospital and was living at 54 Paice Avenue in Sandringham. He then missed Richmond's next 3 matches as he recovered before returning to their first grade side for their round 5 match against Marist Old Boys on May 27. Marist won the match 12-6. In round 6 against Newton in a match won 18-10 by Richmond it was said that their “three-quarter line — Marshall, Mitchell and Bennett — always was dangerous, the ex-Feilding High School centre, Mitchell being a classy player”. The Herald said that he was “a promising footballer”. Then in their round 7, 36-12 win over Ponsonby United he scored his first try. The Auckland Star said that “Marshall, Mitchell, and Bennett make a speedy three-quarter trio, and the centre's [Mitchell's] play on Saturday was most impressive”. His “good try” came in the first half after Richmond had been dominating in open play. Then in round 8 in a 12-8 loss to City the Auckland Star said that the Richmond backs attacked across the field too much which cramped “the wingers, of whom Mitchell was the star. This player shows much promise”. While the Herald said he and Bennett “played with plenty of dash”. Round 9 saw Richmond draw with competition leaders Devonport United 5-5 at Carlaw Park. He had played once more on the wing and it was said that “Mitchell was out of his usual position, but is well equipped as a scoring man”. The following week in a 13-5 loss to Marist, the Star reported that the Richmond “wingers, Marshall and Mitchell, were very fleet and willing”.

Mitchell's form by this point in the season had caught the eye of the selectors and he was named as a reserve for an Auckland trial to be played as curtain raiser to the Auckland v South Auckland (northern Waikato) match on July 15 at Carlaw Park. In this era reserves were only allowed to be called on due to first half injuries and Mitchell was not required to play. Around this time the legendary rugby and rugby league player Bert Cooke returned to the Richmond side and as a result the young Mitchell was dropped down to their senior B side. Though he did return to the top side for round 3 of the Challenge Round series of matches on September 2. He played again the following weekend in round 4, and then again in the Stormont Shield final against Devonport United. Richmond had qualified earlier by winning the Roope Rooster competition, with the Stormont Shield being played for by the championship winners and the Roope Rooster winners each season. Richmond lost 12-7 but Mitchell was outstanding on the day. The Auckland Star, in reference to the Richmond three-quarters, said “these three club colts – Mitchell, Young, and Abbott- combined brilliantly. The first mentioned, a Feilding High School old boy, was the star of the day, his strong and clever running and defensive work stamping him a player of exceptional calibre”.

Then on September 27 Mitchell was given the opportunity to play against the touring St George side from Sydney. They had finished runner up in the NSWRFL competition. They played seven matches on their tour. Richmond won a physical encounter 13-8 with Mitchell and Stan Prentice “the outstanding backs”, with “both playing hard football and tackling solidly, while they consistently followed up fast”. On October 10 Auckland Rugby League decided to find the ‘best club team in Auckland’ by pairing up Richmond and Marist, who had both defeated St George. Richmond won the match easily by 31 points to 8 but Mitchell, playing on the wing “left the field with a wrenched knee”. As a result he missed the final few matches of the season including Richmond's second match with St George which they also won 5-3. This brought to an end his debut season in the rugby league code.

The 1934 season saw Mitchell play 12 games once more for Richmond. His season was cut short slightly by injury too, though he did manage to score 6 tries for them. Mitchell's first try though did not come until round 7 when Richmond defeated Marist 20-8. Richmond were undefeated at this point, beating most teams handily. As well as scoring he also helped Bert Cooke score after Mitchell broke away “and Ted Mincham ran round on the outside of him to take the pass. Realising the opportunity Cooke dashed up in a flash and reverse passing between Mincham and himself completely baffled the defence, Cooke eventually touching down between the posts”. The week prior Mitchell had played for the Richmond reserve grade side but due to an injury to McNeil after just ten minutes of the senior game he had had to come on as a replacement and play another hour of football.

Mitchell's first try of the season came in Richmond's 26-10 win over Ponsonby United. He scored a double in a closely fought match which Richmond only led 15-10 until late when the Auckland Star said “Richmond rode to victory on the crest of a wave. In those fleeting minutes glimpses were again seen of the tenacity of one player particularly – Mitchell, the young Richmond left flank-man, who gained due reward to crown a most meritorious general performance”. The Herald said he “ran determinedly from all positions”. The following week Richmond thrashed City 43-14 and Mitchell scored a hat trick. He “was the best of the three-quarters”, but “was unlucky to receive a nasty ear injury toward the end of the game”. On July 14 in a match with Newton, Mitchell was concussed and admitted to Auckland Hospital the following morning. At the time it was stated that he was living on Wellington Street in the City. Making his debut for Richmond in the same match was future Kiwi, Eric Fletcher who had grown up in the Palmerston North area where Mitchell had spent his senior high school years. Fletcher was captaining the Palmerston North Boys' High School 1st XV in Mitchell's final year at Feilding High School in 1928. Along with Mitchell's injury in the match with Newton, Cliff Satherley, and McNeil were also injured, with Mitchell and McNeil still in hospital 2 weeks later. Though it was said that they were “progressing favourably”. Mitchell ultimately missed 5 matches for Richmond and only returned to play in the Stormont Shield final on October 13, some 4 months after his head injury. He took his place in the side ahead of Bennett and unsurprisingly he “did not seem quite in form”. Richmond won nonetheless 21-5 over Newton to claim their first ever Stormont Shield title.

=== New Zealand selection ===
The 1935 season was to be the most significant of Mitchell's career. He played 18 matches for Richmond, scoring 8 tries, as well as making his one and only appearance for the New Zealand national side, in addition to a match for Auckland Province.

In Richmond's opening match for the season against Newton the ball “did not go so much the way of Mitchell” in a 27-15 win. His handling was also said to be “a little uncertain”. In round 2 Richmond beat Mount Albert United 27-13 with “Noel Bickerton, Bert Cooke, and Ted Mincham on their toes, with the result that Mitchell and McNeil sparkled”. Following a 14-6 over Newton on June 15 it was said that he had “shone for his resource”. And that Fletcher and Mitchell were prominent on attack”. His first try of the season came against Devonport in round 10. He was described as “fit and alert” along with McNeil on the other wing in a 28-0 win. He “showed plenty of dash and scored a fine try as the result of determined running”.

On the evening of July 19, Mitchell departed Auckland by train with the Richmond team to play Wellington in Wellington. They were staying at the Royal Oak Hotel. Mitchell scored 2 tries and played a “fine game” in their 32-4 win at Winter Show Stadium before a crowd of 3,000. Then in a round 14 win over City by 19 points to 6 Mitchell scored again and he and McNeil “played with dash on the wings”. The following week saw a ‘final’ for the Fox Memorial championship between Richmond and Mount Albert who were tied on 19 competition points after the round robin had finished. Richmond won 14-9 to claim their second championship. Mitchell disappointed in Richmond's round 1 win over Devonport in the Roope Rooster knockout competition. He had “replaced McNeil on the opposite wing, [and] did not impress greatly, and particularly in the first spell lack of understanding with Bickerton and Fletcher and erratic handling cost his side points”. He “did not play with confidence and dropped many passes”. Nevertheless he was selected to play in Richmond's semi final win over Mount Albert (20-6), before again being chosen to play on the wing in the final against Newton Rangers. Both teams were depleted as Auckland was on tour, so Richmond played without Bert Cooke, Eric Fletcher, Cliff Satherley, and Bill Telford, while Newton was missing Claude Dempsey, and Ted Brimble. Newton won a close match 10-8 with Mitchell said to have “shown up frequently for determined running”. A week later Mitchell had a big impact on the Stormont Shield ‘champion of champions’ match, scoring 4 tries in a 26-15 win over Newton. He was “the star of the match [and] scored … tries by determined and confident finish. He was too resourceful for his vis-à-vis, Pope, and Clemm, who was taken out of the pack to strengthen the defensive line”. It was said that Ted Mincham's speed “made good opportunities for Mitchell, who played a splendid game on the wing”.

Following the match, the Auckland team was named to play the touring Australian side. Mitchell was not initially named in the squad but due to the unavailability of fullback Norm Campbell the backline was reshuffled and Mitchell replaced C. Hall on the reserve list. However due to international rules at the time there were no replacements allowed once the match had started and unsurprisingly Mitchell was not able to take the field.

Then on October 3, he was named to play in the 3rd and final test for New Zealand. New Zealand had won the first test at Carlaw Park in Auckland 22-14 on September 28, before losing the second at the same venue 4 days later on October 2 (8-29). Mitchell was replacing his Richmond team mate Ted Mincham who had been disappointing in the second test. The Auckland Star said of Mitchell that he is “a resolute and heady player with big match temperament”, which was slightly curious given he had never played a single game of representative rugby league. He was picked on the wing with Arthur Kay in the centres and Lou Brown on the other wing, with Cliff Hunt at fullback. The five-eighths were Brian Riley, and Mitchell's Richmond team mate Stan Prentice, while another club mate, Eric Fletcher was also on debut at halfback.

New Zealand was well beaten in the third test 31-8 which was also played at Carlaw Park. Mitchell had a quiet game and was barely named in any match reports. One mention of Mitchell was that “he gained useful ground with a nice dash down the side line” when the scores were locked at 8-8 in the first half. Ray Lawless then took possession and carried play thirty yards further down field before Laurie Ward of Australia saved “well with a fine tackle”. Mitchell was subsequently named in the Auckland Provincial team to play Australia during the following week indicating that he can't have played a bad game. The Star said that he was part of “a smart three-quarter line” that also included the brothers George and Wally Tittleton, with Claude Dempsey at fullback. Mitchell was again rarely involved in the match which Auckland Province lost 36-18 and was not mentioned in any of the relatively brief newspaper reports describing the play.

=== Transfer to Newton and end of career ===
These two representative matches were to be the first, and last of Mitchell's career. In 1936, he only made one appearance for Richmond on June 6 against Devonport. The match was drawn 8-8 with Mitchell scoring a try. The Herald said that “Mitchell was the better of the wingers and he scored a try for Richmond by coming into the five eighths position and receiving an in-pass, a movement which left the opposition standing. He was named in a handful of the first grade squads for Richmond but there was no mention of him in any of their match reports for the rest of the season so it is unlikely that he played many, or any further matches for them. It appears as though he transferred to rugby union at some point in the season as on August 27 he was granted a transfer to the Newton Rangers “subject to reinstatement approval by the New Zealand Council”. He made his debut for them on September 5 against City Rovers in a round one Roope Rooster loss. His registration was approved the following week, though it seems that he did not play in Newton's final match of the season which was a Phelan Shield loss to Marist. This appears to have been the end of his career as he did not play for Richmond the following season, although his brother George Mitchell did debut for them.

== Personal life and World War 2 ==
On May 23, 1935 Alfred married Hazel Maude Barnett at St Patricks Cathedral in Auckland. After he moved to Auckland he worked at the Naval Dockyards in Auckland. Together Alfred and Hazel had three children including a son, Ron.

In 1938, Alfred was living at 49 Symonds Street according to the Electoral Roll with it stated that he had no occupation. Then on May 15, 1940 he enlisted in the New Zealand Military for World War 2 along with 36 other men in the Auckland city centre. He had served for three years as a territorial in the New Zealand Army before he signed up for active service.

In December, he appeared on a list of men who were leaving Auckland to train at Trentham. They were part of the Fifth Reinforcement of the Second New Zealand Exhibitionary Force. While at war he attained the rank of Lance Corporal while with the Māori Battalion. In 1941, he was listed as living at 23 Kings Road in Mount Roskill, Auckland with his wife Hazel Maude Mitchell. His occupation at the time was recorded as “labourer”.

Alf and Hazel would later separate and indeed they were not living together at the time of his embarkation. He had returned to New Zealand on furlough in February, 1944. She would later remarry Robert Bowden. Hazel died in Toronto, Canada on January 13, 2007. Alf was still living at the same address in Mount Roskill while Hazel was living at 16 Summers Street in Ponsonby, Auckland.

After the war, Mitchell settled once more in Auckland. In February 1949, he was sentenced to one month in jail for dealing in “sly grog at premises in Hobson Street” along with Mary Benson Cannon. He then moved to Wellington and lost contact with his family and by 1963 he was living at 38 Cuba Street with his occupation as labourer according to electoral rolls. He later moved and was living at 108 Wallace Street in Island Bay, Wellington and was now a pensioner.

Alfred died on February 28, 1974, aged 63. He was buried at Karori Cemetery in Wellington in the Soldiers section, plot number 3 Z/5.
