= Ted Mincham =

New Zealand international rugby league & union player (1910–1981)

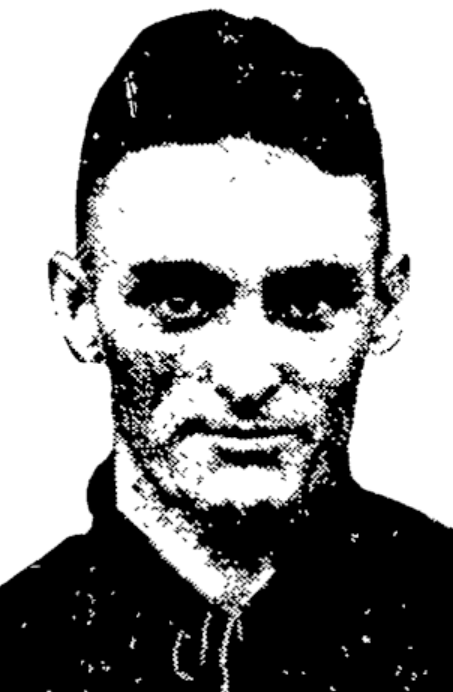

Personal information
- Full name: Edward Thomas Mincham
- Born: 31 January 1910 Auckland, New Zealand
- Died: 15 June 1981 (aged 71) Auckland, New Zealand

Playing information
- Weight: 11 st 0 lb (70 kg)

Rugby union
Club
Years	Team	Pld	T	G	FG	P
1932	Poneke (Wellington)	16	9	12	0	52

Rugby league
- Position: Centre, Wing
Club
Years	Team	Pld	T	G	FG	P
1928–31	Richmond Rovers	43	22	37	0	141
1932–33	Celtic (WRL)	17	7	16	0	53
1934–37	Richmond Rovers	70	30	48	0	186
1938	Mount Albert United	8	3	16	0	41
1941–42	Richmond Rovers	11	5	4	0	23
	Total	149	67	121	0	444
Representative
Years	Team	Pld	T	G	FG	P
1929–37	Auckland	8	8	5	0	34
1931	Auckland Colts	1	1	0	0	3
1932	Wellington	1	3	2	0	13
1932	Town A (Well Trial)	1
1935	North Island	1	0	0	0	0
1935–36	New Zealand	3	0	0	0	0
1936–1938	Auckland Pākehā	2	1	4	0	11

Refereeing information
Years	Competition	Apps
1938–39	ARL senior games	10
- Relatives: Bob Mincham (son)

Ted Mincham (31 January 1910 − 15 June 1981) was a rugby league player who represented New Zealand in three test matches in 1935 and 1936, twice against Australia and once against England. In the process he became the 229th player to represent New Zealand. He also played rugby league for the Auckland and North Island representative sides. Mincham played rugby league for the Richmond Rovers for many years and Mount Albert United for one season in Auckland, as well as the Celtic rugby league club in Wellington. He played one season for the Poneke rugby union club in Wellington as well. His father Bill Mincham was a senior league player in Auckland in its formative years who also represented Auckland and later became a representative referee and high-ranking official in the game. Ted's son, Robert Mincham, represented Auckland and New Zealand in the 1960s.

== Early life ==
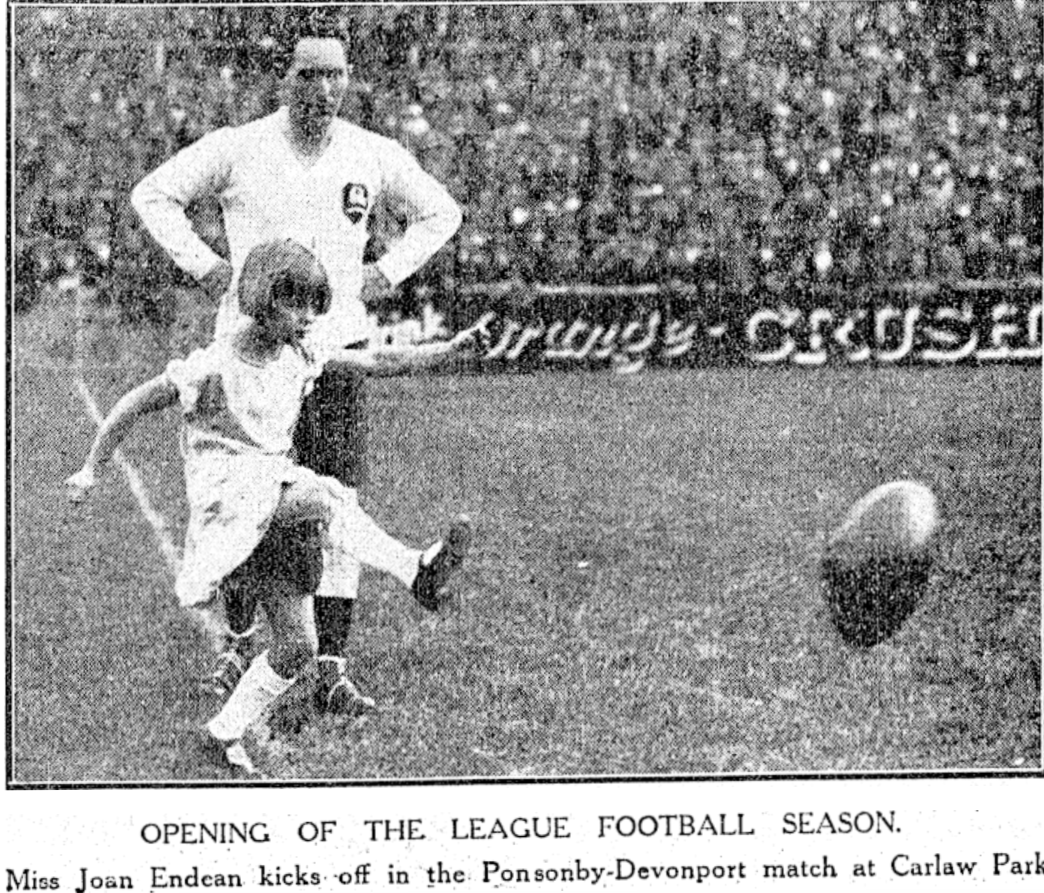
His father Bill Mincham at the opening game of the 1926 season.

Ted Mincham was born Edward Thomas Mincham on 31 January 1910, to Harriet Garraway Mincham (née McCune) and William (Bill) Edward George Mincham. He had a brother, Arnold James Mincham who was born in 1915. The family grew up in the Grey Lynn area in central Auckland. His father Bill had played rugby for the City club in the early part of the century and switched to the Ponsonby United rugby league club in 1912 when the code was in its formative years. He later became a senior grade and representative rugby league referee and a high ranking rugby league official in Auckland for many years.

== Playing career ==
=== Richmond Rovers and amateur sprinting ===
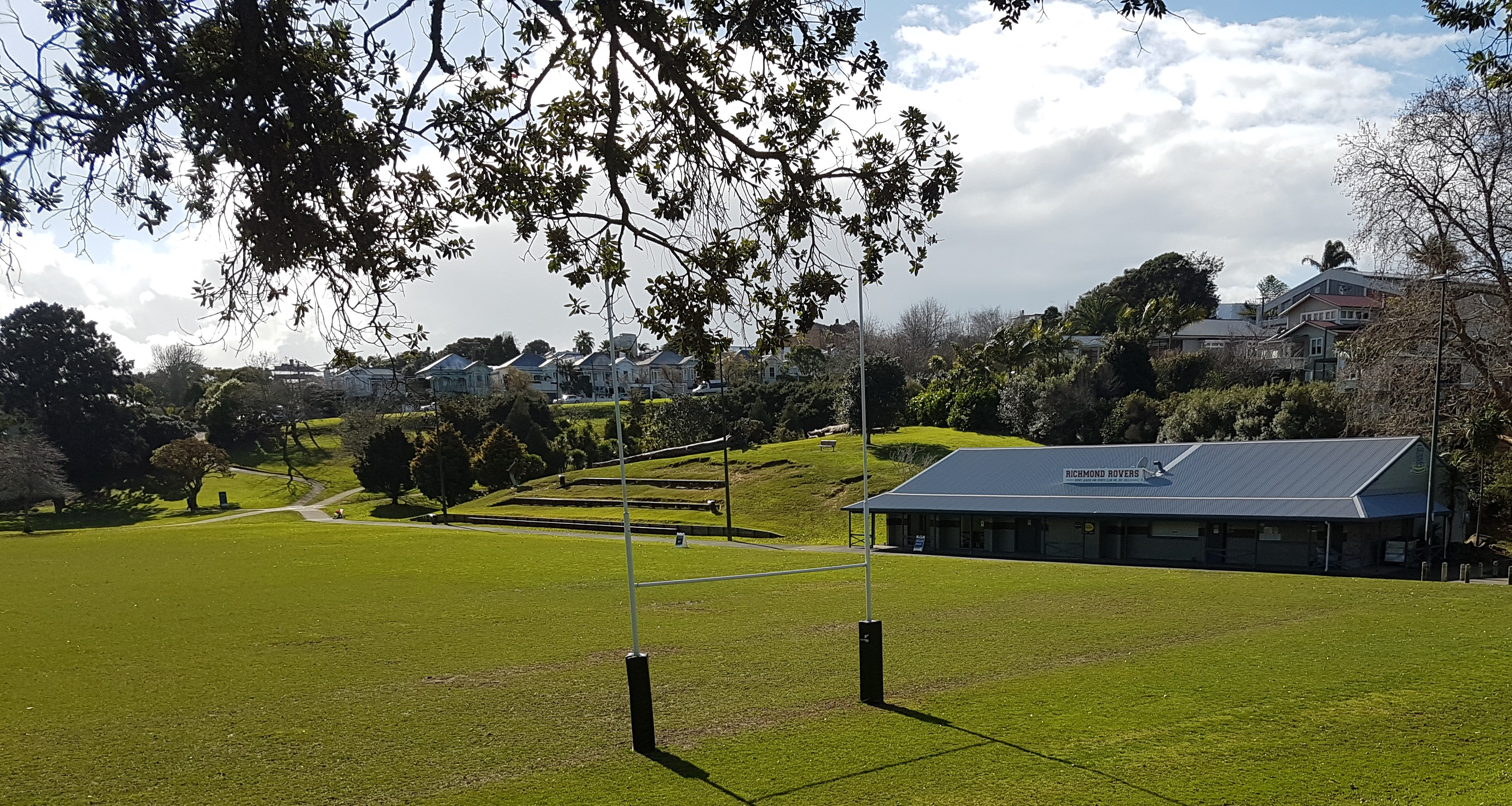
Richmond Rovers RL club and grounds where Ted Mincham played as a junior and senior.

Ted Mincham played for the Richmond Rovers club who were based in the Grey Lynn suburb in central Auckland. He began playing in their junior teams and in 1926 was in the 5th grade side before progressing to the fourth grade in 1927. At the end of the season he competed at Carlaw Park in the annual tabloid athletic meeting and sports tournament of the Auckland Military Sports Association. Mincham won the second heat of the 100 yard race while representing the 28th Company and then won the final.

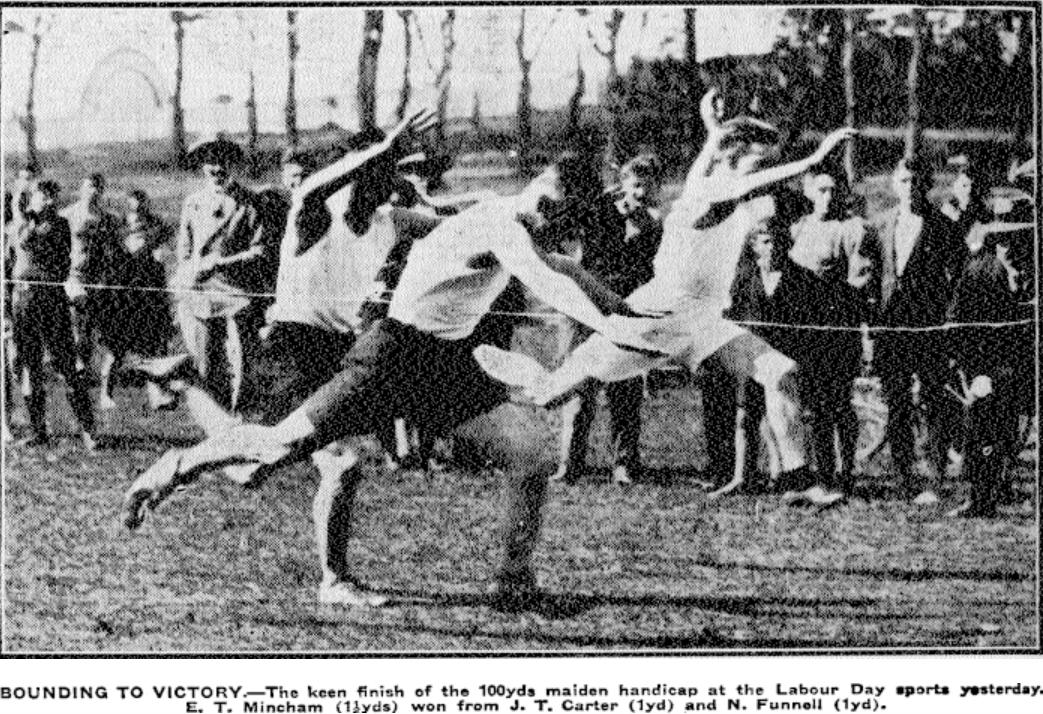
Mincham winning the 100 yard maiden handicap at the Labour Day sports day on 22 October at the Auckland Domain.

In 1928 he had progressed to their 3rd grade intermediate team to start the season. Then at the end of the season he debuted for the senior side in a Labour Day tournament held over two weekends at Carlaw Park where he made 3 appearances. Richmond had taken the opportunity to try some younger players for the matches. His first was against Newton Rangers on 20 October and he scored 1 try. The New Zealand Herald reported that "Mincham played a particularly good game, being very elusive on attack". As part of the weekend celebrations many other sporting events were also held including running races at the Auckland Domain. Mincham won the 100 yard race in a time of 11.15 seconds. The Sun newspaper at the time published a photograph of Mincham winning the race narrowly. He played in their semi final win over Ponsonby United the following weekend and the final which was played the same afternoon against Marist Old Boys. Mincham scored a try in a 12–5 loss.

On 7 November at the Auckland Amateur Athletic and Cycle Club meeting at the Auckland Domain, Mincham won the 100 yard handicap race. He had a 7-yard handicap and won by 2 yards from A.E. Butler and A.J. Elliot. Then on 16 February at an athletic meeting at Carlaw Park he won the first heat of the 100 yard handicap in a time of 10.35 seconds after having a 5.5 yard handicap though he failed to place in the final.

=== Auckland selection ===
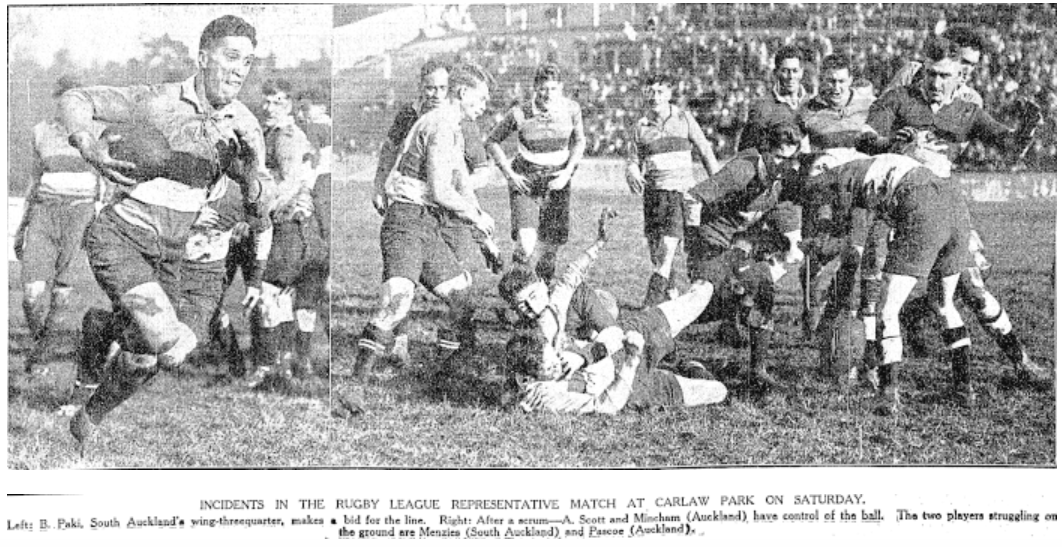

Mincham began the 1929 season in the Richmond senior side. The Auckland Star prior to the start of the season said "Young Mincham, who graduated from the juniors late last year, will become a permanent fixture on the wing, as far as can be foreseen, and a successful career appears to be ahead of him". They were proved accurate almost immediately as through 12 matches Mincham had scored 5 tries and kicked 15 goals for 45 total points and he was then selected in a 20-man training group for the Auckland team to play South Auckland. He was named in the reserves for the match but during the game Lindsay Simons went off injured and Mincham came on as a replacement to make his Auckland debut. Auckland hung on for an 11–8 win before a crowd of 10,000 at Carlaw Park. It was said that "Mincham scarcely demonstrated that he is sufficiently experienced for rep. honours as yet".

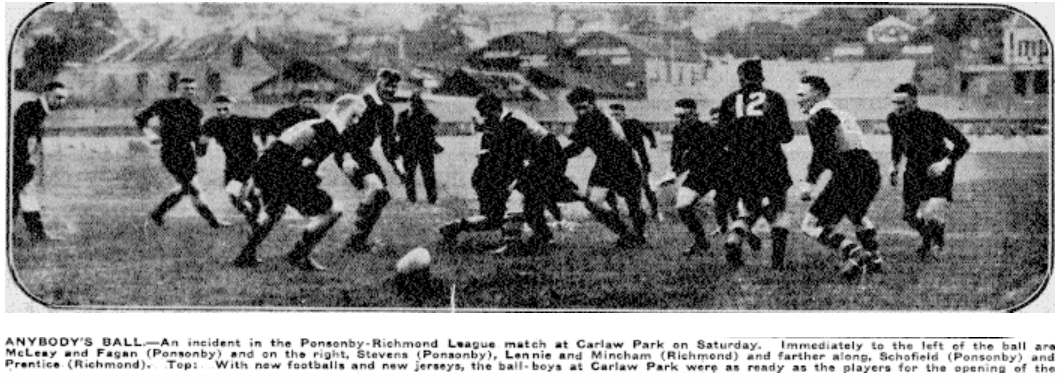
Mincham playing for Richmond against Ponsonby at Carlaw Park in Round 1, 1930. He is shown immediately to the left of the #12 player.

The 1930 season saw Mincham play 16 times for Richmond, scoring 10 tries and kicking 13 goals for a personal tally of 56 points. This meant that he finished with the 5th most tries and 3rd most points in senior competition games. He was however overlooked by the representative selectors. In a round 12 match on 16 August he had to leave the field injured before returning later and was said to have played "a fine game at centre". Richmond finished last in the championship but beat Marist Old Boys and City Rovers in the Roope Rooster 1st round and semi final respectively with Mincham scoring a try in each match. In the final against Ponsonby he kicked a conversion and a penalty but Richmond were defeated 15–7.

At the start of the 1931 season it was reported that Richmond had "lost the services of Mincham and Taylor" though it was not stated why. He returned to play around round 7 against Ponsonby when it was said "one of the outstanding backs was undoubtedly Mincham, who played a convincing game for Richmond". The following week against Marist he again played well at centre but went off injured before halftime. The Auckland Star reported that "Young Mincham has something of the same blemish" in reference to a teammate who had "pace, energy, and strength, but is inclined to be rash at times". Over the following 7 matches Mincham scored 5 tries and kicked 9 goals. His final match for Richmond for the season was in a 28-20 semi final loss in the Roope Rooster knockout competition. The match was significant because it finished 20–20 at full time and was the first ever senior league match in Auckland that went to extra time. Mincham scored a try and kicked 4 goals in the loss. He was then named in the Auckland side to play Northland on 26 September. Players such as Ben Davidson, Hec Brisbane, Len Scott, Alan Clarke, and Claude List were unavailable so the selectors (Bert Avery, Albert Asher, and Thomas McClymont) chose a particularly young side. In a 19–19 draw Mincham scored 2 tries and kicked a conversion at Carlaw Park. A month later Mincham was chosen for an Auckland Colts side to play against the touring Eastern Suburbs side from Sydney. The colts team lost 18–13 with Mincham scoring a try after the Eastern Suburbs backs failed to clear the ball and "Mincham, coming up fast, dived over at the flag to bring the scores level" 10-10.

=== Poneke rugby ===
In late April 1932 the New Zealand Herald reported that Mincham had left Auckland. He had been transferred to Wellington for work and joined the Poneke Rugby Club at the start of the season. Mincham played 16 matches for them on the wing during the season scoring 9 tries and kicking 11 conversions and a penalty for 52 total points. His first match was in a game against University on 16 April and he scored a try in a 39–3 win. The Evening Post said that he played "splendidly" and "promises to be a decided acquisition to the team". He injured his wrist in a match on 3 June against Petone but recovered well enough to play against the following weekend against Old Boys. He was injured again in a game against Oriental on 8 July after he had earlier scored a try and kicked 2 conversions in a 19–8 win. Curiously despite playing the entire season for Poneke he was left out of the team that played in the final against Petone on Athletic Park on 20 August.

=== Celtic rugby league club and Wellington representative appearance ===
A fortnight later Mincham was named to play for the Celtic rugby league side in a match against Koro Koro at the Winter Showgrounds on 3 September. The following week the New Zealand rugby league advised that "the reinstatement of E.T. Mincham… had been approved".

Following Celtic's 17–5 over Koro Koro he was named to play in the Wellington representative side in a match against the Greymouth Marist club side on the Winter Show Ground on 10 September. The Evening Post said "Mincham, who played for Poneke in senior rugby this season, and who is an ex-Auckland league player, will captain the Wellington team". In Wellington's match with Greymouth Marist, Mincham scored 3 tries and kicked 2 penalties in a 23–19 loss. The newspaper reports noted that "Mincham did not shine in the rugby game for Poneke for the simple reason that he was poorly served with the ball. He showed on Saturday that with plenty of the ball he is a dangerous man, and one try he scored down the side line with but a yard in which to work and the two opponents to beat, was a real masterpiece. He dummied his way through with body sway where nothing else would have been effective".

In Celtics match against Petone on 17 September he went off injured in the first half of a 10–6 loss. Mincham was then named to captain Wellington in a match against Canterbury at the Winter Showground on 23 September but he ultimately did not play and his season came to an end.

In 1933 Mincham played 15 games for Celtic and scored at least 7 tries and kicked at least 16 goals for 53 reported points. Not all of the matches had the individual scoring reported for example in a 24 June match against Koro Koro which Celtic won 48 to 6 it was said "Mincham was in good goal-kicking form", but it is unknown how many he actually kicked. Celtic went through the season unbeaten to win the championship after defeating Randwick in the final on 22 July. They scored 287 points and only conceded 26. In early August Mincham was named captain in a Wellington trial side (Town A) to play against a Country A side.

During the summer Mincham played cricket for the Celtic cricket team in the Mercantile League C Grade. He had a successful season with the bat and it was reported in mid January that he was leading the competition on aggregate runs with 570, and had the highest score in the competition over the previous six years of an unbeaten 192. He also took a large number of wickets through the season.

=== Return to Richmond Rovers ===
Mincham returned to Auckland early in 1934 and rejoined his former Richmond club after his transfer cleared by New Zealand Rugby League. At the same time it was reported that Ted's father William (Bill), had been reappointed as the Auckland rugby league representative team selector along with Ernie Asher, and Bert Avery. Ted was in outstanding form for Richmond where he was playing centre and after 9 rounds of the Fox Memorial championship he had scored 9 tries and kicked 22 goals. He was then selected for Auckland to play against Taranaki on 30 June. Mincham would ultimately score 74 points for Richmond and be the leading score in senior club league for the 1934 season. The week he was chosen for the match against Taranaki the Auckland Star said that in Richmond's match with City Rovers he had been "constantly alert to seize an opportunity to bore holes in the defence. His goal kicking was also excellent". He was selected to play centre for Auckland though the New Zealand Herald said he "would probably prove more valuable as a wing, but he is the type of player who can adapt himself to the inside positions". Auckland won the match at Carlaw Park easily by 35 points to 8 with Mincham kicking a penalty, though he did miss two conversions. He, along with Stan Prentice "played their usual sound all-round games".

Against Marist Old Boys on 21 July he was taken from the field with a leg injury in a 13–10 win. Richmond did not play again until 2 weeks later when Mincham was part of the side which beat Ponsonby United 18–0 to win their first ever senior championship. He scored a try in the match. Richmond were in fact in the midst of one of the more remarkable seasons in Auckland rugby league history. They went on to also win the Roope Rooster and the Stormont Shield. They were the first team ever to do this and they also defeated the touring Western Suburbs who were the New South Wales RL champions twice by 18 to 16 and 10 to 3. In the first match against Western Suburbs, Mincham was "conspicuous for good play". It was later reported that he had suffered an injury to his knee during the match which became inflamed. The following day the touring side and local players including Mincham attended a picnic on Pine Island (present day Herald Island near Greenhithe) when he suddenly fell ill. A launch had to take him to the city where he was taken to hospital. He was said to have "suffered severe abdominal pains" and "his condition [in hospital] was stated to be fairly serious". Unsurprisingly he did not play in the second match against the touring side along with the Stormont Shield final and his season came to an end. Prior to his injury Mincham had played in his second representative match of the season against South Auckland on 15 September. Auckland won 35 to 16 with "most of the play [going] to Mincham’s wing. He showed plenty of pace and scored two good tries".

=== North Island selection ===
Mincham was playing at centre for Richmond in 1935 and through 12 games had scored 5 tries. His form was particularly outstanding and would see him make his North Island then New Zealand debuts later in the year. Following a 10–9 win over Devonport it was said that "Mincham at centre was one of the shining lights of the contest, and his final burst through the opposition in a swerving run that carried him three quarters the length of the field and within a few yards of a try, deserved a better reward". In a round 10 match against the same opponent he "stood out for his speed and anticipation at centre. He made some thrilling runs and served his wingers to the best advantage". While the Herald reported that "he made some clever openings and was instrumental in several of the tries being scored. A speedy runner with a deceptive swerve, Mincham often left the opposition standing, while his work on defence was also of a high standard". Against Marist Old Boys on 13 July he was playing on the wing where he "showed all his mercurial dash". He combined in one "brilliant movement" with Bert Cooke involving "a reverse passing bout which went almost the length of the field" before Cooke scored, and "played right up to his best form, and was easily the best three-quarters on either side".

Against City on 27 July he "played a very fine game at centre and made some nice runs through the defence" and was subsequently selected for the Auckland team to play Taranaki by Bert Avery, Ernie Asher, and his father Bill (William) with the three selectors having retained their role. The Herald was glowing in their praise of Mincham comparing his play to his opposite Lou Brown who had played professionally for several years in England but was back in New Zealand playing for City Rovers. They said "the splendid football of L. Brown and E. Mincham, the rival centre three-quarters, was a feature of the big game, and the pair made a favourable impression with the crowd. It is a long time since the code has possessed two such clever players on attack. Brown has had much more experience than Mincham, but the last-named is almost as brilliant. With a few games together in representative matches the pair are likely to provide an obstacle for the visiting Australian team". Against Taranaki he scored 3 tries in a 37–14 win at Carlaw Park and was said to be "the scintillating start of the Auckland backs, his speed, sure handling and team work with his centre, Lou Brown, bringing a rich harvest of tries for his side".

He was then named in the North Island side to play in their annual fixture against the South Island at Carlaw Park. The weekend prior to the match however Mincham turned out for Richmond in the championship final against Mount Albert United which saw Richmond win their second consecutive title 14 to 9. He had begun the match on the wing but was moved into centre "where he was associated in some good movements".

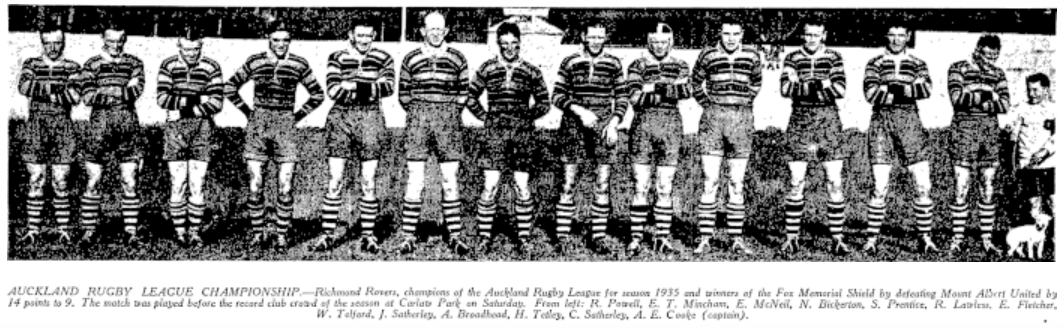

The inter-island match was played on 17 August and saw the North Island win narrowly 19–18. Mincham who played on the wing, "was not as impressive as usual" and was kept in check by his opposite F. Logie". Although the Herald reported that "Prentice, Brown and Mincham were at the top of their form, and he was involved in a run down the side line which led to Cooke’s try that ultimately won the North Island the match.

=== New Zealand debut ===
Mincham then played 4 matches for Richmond including the Roope Rooster final loss to Newton Rangers and then the Stormont Shield match against the same opponent a week later on 14 September. Richmond won the Stormont Shield game with Mincham scoring a try and kicking 4 goals in their 26-15 victory. It was said that he was "playing the ideal centre technique, going off the mark like a bullet, sighting the gaps in a flash and feeding his wingers well, impressed…"

After the match the Auckland team was chosen to play against Australia with Mincham chosen on the wing. The match was played at Carlaw Park on 14 September and before a crowd of 15,000 Auckland went down 16 points to 8. Mincham scored a try and kicked a penalty in the loss. Mincham had seemingly been moved into a more central position as his try was described: "Mincham cut in between (Ross) McKinnon and (Ray) Hines and sent the ball along to Lou Brown. The winger made ground and then whipped an in-pass to Mincham. The centre accepted and finished off a really magnificent effort" which made the score 8–3 in favour of the Australians. He was also involved in a break which eventually led to Bill Telford scoring. The Auckland Star stated after the match that "Mincham was brilliant at centre at times". Mincham was then selected for the New Zealand team to play Australia in the first test. The test was played at Carlaw Park on 28 September and saw New Zealand pull off a shock upset 22-14 before an estimated crowd of 20,000. The win was based largely on New Zealand's defence. With the "backs taken collectively [being] uneven on attack, although some of them, notably (Arthur) Kay, Lou Brown and Mincham, teamed sweetly at times". Early in the game after Australia had opened the scoring with a try Mincham made "a nice run… on the wing, [which] placed New Zealand in a good position". Minutes later New Zealand attacked further and scored a try to level the scores. Mincham had the opportunity to kick two goals later in the match but he failed to convert either of Brown's tries with the second hitting the upright. Mincham was chosen again to play in the second test which was scheduled for the Wednesday also at Carlaw Park.

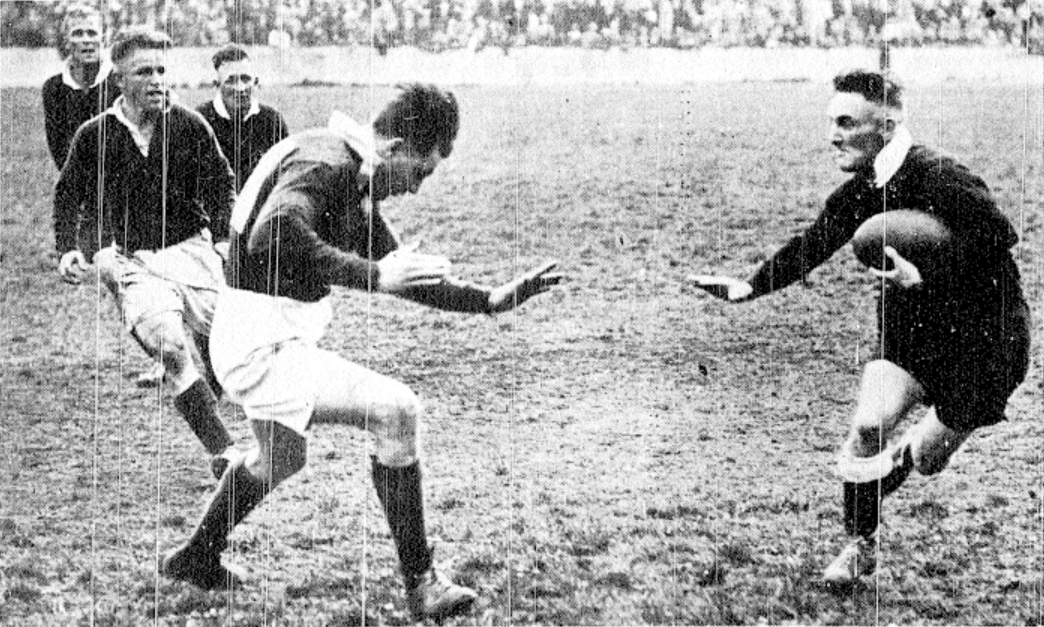
Ted Mincham about to fend Ray Hines in the 2nd test v Australia at Carlaw Park.

New Zealand were well beaten 29-8 and Mincham was said to have been "below form on the left wing, and was outwitted time and time again by R. Hines, his vis-s-vis". He also had an opportunity to kick a penalty early in the second half after 3 other kickers had been used but failed. Following the loss Mincham was dropped for the third test and was replaced by his Richmond teammate Alf Mitchell with the Auckland Star saying that he "certainly did not perform satisfactorily". The Herald said that his dropping was "rather surprising, as last Wednesday was the first occasion on which Mincham failed to reveal his best form this season".

=== Richmond and Auckland ===
Mincham played 17 games for Mincham in 1936, scoring 4 tries and kicking 12 goals for 36 points. Richmond finished runner up by just one point to the newly added Manukau senior side. He missed a round 3 match due to an injury Mincham was tried at first five eighth when he came back from injury a week later against Marist however it was said that he "does not seem suited to the five eighths position usually occupied by Fletcher, who stood down owing to injuries". He played there again against Newton but it was said once again that despite doing "a lot of defensive work, [he] does not appear suited to the first five eighth position". He was moved further out for subsequent games and the following week "was seen in his best form and his nippiness time and again had the Devonport defence perplexed". He began to come back into his own by this point and it was said that he and Wally Tittleton "are now in their best form" and "both made nice openings". He was forced from the field against City with a leg injury however it was not serious enough to keep him out of the side to play Ponsonby the following week where he kicked 3 goals in a 15–6 win.

Mincham was then named in an Auckland side to play a midweek match against a Māori representative side. Auckland lost the match to their strong Māori opponents who featured five New Zealand representatives, 30–21 with Mincham kicking 2 conversions.

=== New Zealand v England ===
The New Zealand selectors chose an initial training squad to prepare for the test series against England. However Mincham missed out with the Herald reporting that he "is decidedly unlucky to be omitted from the players chosen to practise in view of the matches against England". He kicked 4 penalty goals in an 11–11 draw with Mount Albert United where playing at centre he "made some splendid openings". He was then chosen in an A Team to play a trial match as curtain-raiser to the North Island v South Island match however he was unavailable to play. He played two more matches for Richmond and was then picked by the New Zealand selectors to "train as a reserve with the New Zealand team preparing for the first test match against England" along with Harold Tetley, Angus Gault, and Frank Halloran. New Zealand lost the first test 10 points to 8 at Carlaw Park on 8 August. Mincham was then selected to play in the second and final test on 15 August. He was moving into the side on to the wing, replacing the injured Len Scott. The Herald wrote "Mincham, who previously represented New Zealand, has been showing fine form in club football for Richmond and is a clever attacking player. He should show to advantage if given opportunities, especially in any scissors passing". New Zealand played disappointingly in the second test and lost 23 to 11 before a crowd of 15,000 at Carlaw Park. Mincham received few opportunities and "failed to impress".

He then moved back to club football for Richmond for the remainder of the season. Following a Roope Rooster match against Marist it was said "Mincham was the life and soul of the Richmond rear guard, and has not been seen in better form this season. He made some dazzling openings and his winger were given every advantage". His final appearance of the season came in the Stormont Shield final between Richmond and Manukau. Richmond won easily by 30 points to 9 with Mincham scoring 2 tries. It was said that he and Roy Powell gave the best display seen at Carlaw Park this season in their respective positions... Mincham has undoubted talent as a centre and his play on Saturday was excellent".

=== Richmond and Auckland ===
The 1937 season saw Mincham busy for Richmond, playing 19 games and scoring 8 tries along with 10 goals for 44 points. Richmond won the championship for the third time in their history a point ahead of Mount Albert and Marist. Now aged 27 Mincham was captaining Richmond. He was named in the Auckland team to play Auckland Māori but did not ultimately play in the match. He was however picked to play for Auckland against South Auckland on 9 June with Auckland winning 27–10. It was his only representative appearance of the season which came to an end with Richmond's 12–5 loss to Marist on 2 October. Mincham kicked a penalty for the losing side with it said that he, Noel Bickerton and Roy Powell "were the pick of the backs, with snappy penetrating runs and safe handling".

=== Transfer to Mount Albert United ===
Mincham transferred to the Mount Albert United club for the 1938 season. In his first match for them on 2 April against his former Richmond side he scored a try and kicked 3 goals in a 24–15 win. Mincham only played 8 games for Mount Albert with his last match being their round 8 win over City Rovers. He scored a try in the 29–10 win but went off with an injury. To this point he had scored 3 tries and kicked 16 goals for them. Despite leaving the field with an injury Mincham had recovered well enough to play for the Auckland Pakehā team just 2 days later against Auckland Māori. He scored a try and kicked 2 conversions in a 26–21 loss.

=== Retirement and refereeing ===
As it turned out the game for Auckland Pakehā was to be his last game of the season. At least as a player. It was reported on 21 June that "E.T. Mincham, Richmond and latterly Mount Albert three-quarter, and an international player, was admitted to membership. He is a son of Mr. W. Mincham, a member of the Auckland Rugby League control board and an ex-Auckland representative referee". He had in fact refereed a game days earlier on 18 June between the Ellerslie United and Manukau seventh grade sides on the Auckland Domain. Over the remainder of the year he refereed in most grades and also controlled three senior games. The first of these was the match between North Shore and Papakura on 30 July at Carlaw Park's number 2 field. While the second was an 27 August Roope Rooster clash between City and Mount Albert who he had been playing for just 10 weeks earlier. City won the match 8 points to 2. His last match of the year was the Phelan Shield final between Manukau and Papakura on 1 October which Manukau won 18–8. The match was curtain-raiser to his former side Richmond's match against the touring Eastern Suburbs side with Richmond winning 11–9. At the end of the season the Richmond club held their annual picnic at Tui Glen with 450 in attendance and various sports were played including a seven-a-side tournament with the senior schoolboys competing for the Mincham Cup.

In 1939 he continued to officiate matches though he spent most of the first half of the season as a linesman to games at Carlaw Park. At the start of the season his father Bill (William) was made a life member of the Auckland Rugby League Referee's Association after 25 years of service to the game. On the weekend of 29–30 July Ted played in a ‘House’ match between Railways, where he worked, and Smith and Brown at the Ellerslie Domain. He scored 2 tries and 2 conversions in a 19–5 win.

=== Return to play ===
On 14 August Mincham resigned as a referee with it reported that he intended on taking up junior coaching. Then on 23 August he had his transfer back to Richmond from Mount Albert confirmed. The following weekend he was named to play in the Richmond reserve grade side against Mount Albert. He also played for the reserve grade side in the Stallard Cup knockout final against Otahuhu Rovers on 16 September which Richmond won.

At the end of the season Mincham had seemingly retired for good as he did not play at all in 1940. However, in 1941 he made a reappearance for Richmond in a 28 May match against North Shore. With many players away fighting in World War 2 a large number of former players turned out again for senior sides, although Mincham would still have only been aged 31. He scored a try in a 12–7 win. The Auckland Star reported "after a season’s absence from the game E. Mincham reappeared in the Richmond backs to assist that team against North Shore. He played a solid game in the centre, handling cleanly and making good openings for his wings". Against Manukau on 21 August he had to leave the field injured but was able to play the following week against Newton. His final game of the season came in a match with City where he scored a try in a 13-7 Phelan Shield semi final win.

The 1942 season saw Mincham play a small number of games which were against Ponsonby on 16 May, Manukau on 13 June, and the newly combined City-Otahuhu side on 4 July. He kicked a penalty and scored a try along with a conversion in the last 2 matches respectively. In the match with Ponsonby he was played at five eighth and it was reported that "the result was an improvement in the Richmond back play, as Mincham was sure handed and steady and showed good judgement in the way he sent the ball on to McGregor in the centre…". Against the City-Otahuhu side he had come on as a replacement for Kinney and he scored Richmond's first try and then converted McGregor's. He was said to have been "outstanding" on defence late in the match as they hung on to win 8–7.

Mincham then stopped playing for the final time. His only reported involvement in the game after this point was when he was elected onto the Auckland Rugby League Referee's Association social committee in 1945.

== Personal life ==
In 1935 Ted was working as a porter and living at 10 Ariki Street, Grey Lynn with his parents.

He married Emily Mavis Jack at St Peter's Church in Grey Lynn on 11 July 1936. On 8 March 1941, they had a son named Robert Andrew Arnold Mincham. Robert later went on to represent New Zealand at rugby league also in the late 1960s.

Ted was working for the Railway Department in the 1940s and he received an exemption from being conscripted into the World War 2 effort owing to his occupation in early September, 1942. His brother Arnold James Mincham had joined the military and gone to Europe to fight. He was reported missing, believed "prisoner of war" in January 1942. On 9 February the Vatican Radio in Rome broadcast a list of names of prisoners of war in Italy with Arnold's name on it. On 7 December 1943, it was reported that their mother Harriet had received "advice that her son, Private A.J. Mincham, who was a prisoner of war in Italy for about two years, has been transferred to camp Oflag XIA (in Osterode am Harz), Germany". He was released at the end of the war and returned in September 1945 as part of "a large draft of Second N.Z.E.F. personnel who were prisoners of war" and arrived in Wellington having departed from the United Kingdom.

=== Death ===
Ted Mincham died on 15 June 1981, aged 71. He was cremated at Waikumete Cemetery and his ashes were scattered. His wife Emily died on 15 June 1981, aged 71. She was also cremated at Waikumete Cemetery. He was living in Stanmore Bay, Whangaparaoa Peninsula at the time. Their son Robert died on 8 September 1999, aged 58.
