= Stan Prentice =

NZ international rugby league player

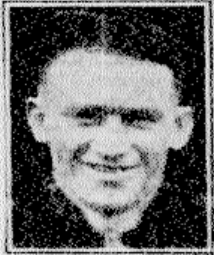

Personal information
- Full name: Stanley Miller Prentice
- Born: 21 June 1903 Auckland, New Zealand
- Died: 31 December 1982 (aged 79) Māngere, Auckland, New Zealand

Playing information
- Weight: 73.9 kg (11 st 9 lb)
- Position: Stand-off
Club
Years	Team	Pld	T	G	FG	P
1926–35	Richmond	131	40	0	0	120
1930	Trotting Trainers	2	2	0	0	6
1937	Ponsonby XIII	1	0	0	0	0
1938	Mount Albert United	1	0	0	0	0
	Total	135	42	0	0	126
Representative
Years	Team	Pld	T	G	FG	P
1926–32	Auckland Trials	4	2	0	0	6
1926–35	Auckland	20	5	0	0	15
1927–35	North Island	5	1	0	0	3
1928–35	New Zealand	5	0	0	0	0

Coaching information
Club
Years	Team	Gms	W	D	L	W%
1938–39	Mount Albert United	40	29	1	10	73
1947–53	Mount Albert United
	Total	40	29	1	10	73
Representative
Years	Team	Gms	W	D	L	W%
1939	Auckland	2	2	0	0	100
1939–40	Auckland Pākehā	4	3	0	1	75
- Source: NZ Herald and Auckland Star

Stan Prentice (21 June 1903 – 31 December 1982) was an Auckland rugby league player who represented New Zealand in 5 test matches from 1928 to 1935. He was Kiwi #192 when he debuted against England in 1928 when he played in all 3 test matches. He then played in 2 tests against Australia in 1935. Prentice played 131 games for Richmond Rovers, captaining them in the later half of his career. He also represented Auckland on 20 occasions, as well as 5 times for the North Island. He later coached Mount Albert United to the 1939 Fox Memorial title and also coached Auckland in 1939 and 1948 as well as being a selector of the side through many seasons.

== Early life ==
Stanley Miller Prentice was born on 21 June 1903 in Auckland, New Zealand. He was the youngest child of James Prentice and Helen Prentice (née Grant). James was born in Glasgow, Scotland, while Helen was born in Holytown, North Lanarkshire, Scotland. Helen and James had 12 children; Elizabeth (b. 1879 in Scotland), Mary (b. 1881 in Scotland), James Roslin (also known as “Jnr Prentice”) (b. 1883 at sea), Annie Grant (b. 1885 in Australia), Henry William (b. 1887 in Australia), James Roslin (b. 1889 in Australia), Robert (b. 1891 in Australia), Helen (b. 1893 in Australia), George Albert (b. 1896), Thomas Gordon (b. 1899 in Auckland), and Victoria May (b. 1901, Auckland) and Stanley Miller Prentice.

The family migrated to Australia from Scotland in 1883 before migrating again to Auckland, New Zealand, in the mid to late 1890s.

== Playing career ==
=== Richmond Rovers ===
Stan Prentice began playing for the Richmond Rovers club based in Grey Lynn, Auckland in 1924 aged 21. He played for the Richmond 3rd grade side and was said to soon show “outstanding ability”. In 1925 he played for the Richmond 4th grade side playing in the backline. They went through the season undefeated to win the 4th grade title. On 10 October 1925, he was part of the Richmond 4th grade team which played curtain-raiser to the Auckland v Queensland match at Carlaw Park. His side won 5–3 over Athletic.

In 1926 Prentice made his debut for the Richmond senior side against Grafton on 24 April in a 23–3 win. It was said that “the colts, Davis, halfback, Prentice, five eighths, and Jenkinson, three quarter gave splendid exhibitions”.

=== Auckland selection and trial matches ===
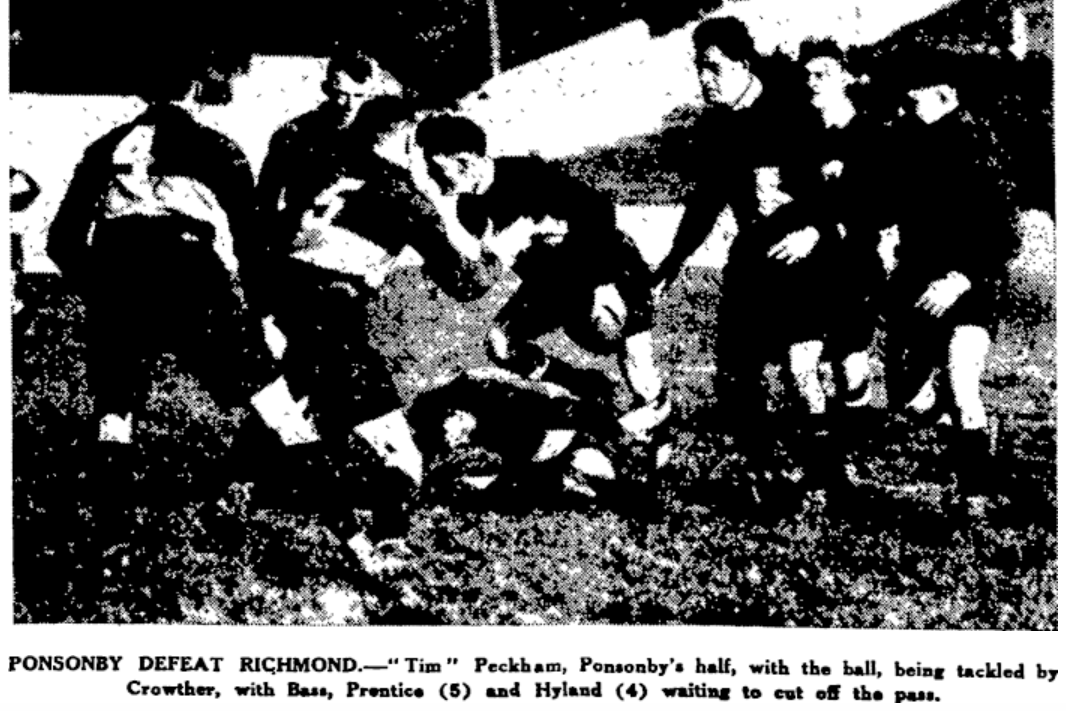

During the 1926 season he would play alongside Kiwi Jim Parkes. Richmond were in their 5th season in the senior grade of the Auckland Rugby League and finished 5th of 8 teams with a 3 win, 8 loss record. Prentice played 15 matches and scored 7 tries while in the standoff position. Amazingly Prentice was selected in a series of trial matches to assist the selectors in choosing the New Zealand side to tour England and Wales in just his first season of senior football. In July he was selected for a trial match at Carlaw Park between an A and B Team as curtain raiser to the North Island v South Island fixture. His B Team went down 25–16, while a week later he played in the B Team's 30–28 win over an A Team side with the match being a curtain raiser to the Probables v Possibles. He missed selection for the tour but The Auckland Star reported at the time that Prentice was “unlucky to miss the Home trip”. Prentice then played for Auckland against the touring New Zealand side on 31 July and scored a try in a 52–32 win when Maurice Wetherill “whipped a scissors pass” to him and he scored “under the bar”. The two combined over and over during the match with “nearly every movement [being] initiated by this pair”. After the match the scribes stated that Prentice “should have been in the team ahead of any of Webb, Delgrosso and Kirwan”, and “is one of the most promising backs seen in action for many seasons” Prentice was chosen for Auckland v Otago on 7 August in a match for the Northern Union Challenge Cup which Auckland won 14–4.

Prentice then capped off a remarkable debut season by being part of the Richmond Rovers side to win the Roope Rooster which was their first ever senior grade trophy before representing Auckland against South Auckland. Auckland won the Northern Union Cup match 25–8. His final match of the year was in the 15-8 Stormont Shield loss to Ponsonby United.

1927 saw Prentice represent Richmond in 13 matches where he scored 2 tries. He played 3 matches for Auckland and was also selected to play for the North Island side for the first time in their regular fixture with the South Island. His first match of the season was for Auckland against the returning New Zealand side (Auckland members only) from Europe and saw Auckland win 24-21.

Richmond once again won the Roope Rooster competition defeating Devonport United 7-6. Against the same opponent earlier in the season Prentice was sent off for the first time in his career though it was unclear what for as several other players were also sent off after words with the referee. Later in the season Richmond won the Stormont Shield too though Prentice missed the match as he was suffering from influenza. His other representative matches for Auckland were against Canterbury, the combined West Coast/Buller side on 10 and 14 September respectively, and then in the final match of the tour against Wellington on 21 September. The matches were part of a Southern Tour and were played at Monica Park in Christchurch and Victoria Park in Greymouth. Auckland defeated Canterbury 24-13 and the West Coast/Buller 42–15. while their win over Wellington was by 41 points to 23. Then on 24 September he played once more for North Island against South Island. North Island were victorious 13–8 with Prentice's “straight running” said to be a noticeable feature. It was said that Prentice had “suffered considerably from a badly-broken nose” sustained in the later part of the season but he had a successful operation during the summer months and “no more trouble is expected from the injury” leading into the 1928 season.

=== New Zealand debut (v Great Britain) ===
The 1928 season saw Prentice make his New Zealand debut against the touring Great Britain. He had begun the season playing 7 matches for Richmond before being selected to play for Auckland against South Auckland on 16 June. Auckland won the match 22–3 at Carlaw Park though Prentice was taken to Auckland Hospital after once again breaking his nose. The injury wasn't serious enough to keep him from playing the following week for Richmond against Newton Rangers and then on 11 July he played for the Auckland Possibles side in a trial match. His side beat the ‘Probables’ 24–14 with Prentice scoring 2 tries. Prentice scored 2 more tries in a match for Auckland where they thrashed Canterbury 66–26 in front of a large crowd of 15,000 at Carlaw Park on 21 July. Four days later he played for Auckland against South Auckland and they upset 19-17 by the travelling team. His form had been good enough to warrant selection for the North Island side. The North Island romped to a 44–8 win and Prentice's halves partnership with Maurice Wetherill was lauded. The Auckland Star wrote “one confidently expects that Prentice and Wetherill will be the New Zealand … five-eighths pair for the first Test, seeing that they combine perfectly, and can each play their respective parts to a nicety. There is nothing showy about Prentice's play, but he has a wonderful defence, and habitually does the right thing without trying to do too much”. The prediction proved correct, as on 2 August Prentice was named to make his debut for New Zealand in the five-eighths alongside Wetherill. Frank Delgrosso was selected to play inside Prentice at halfback.

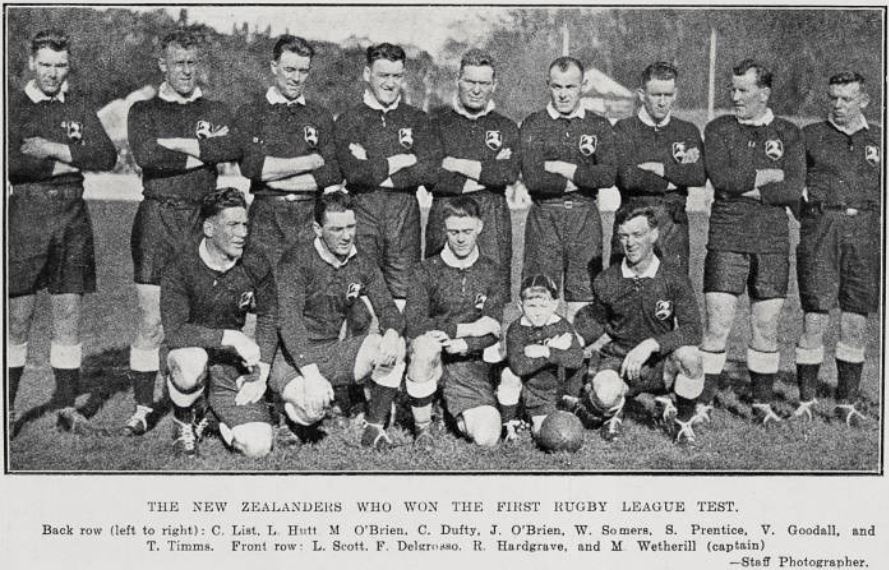
The NZ 1st test team at Carlaw Park on Aug 4, 1928.

The First test was played at Carlaw Park on 4 August. An enormous crowd of 30,000 packed into the ground to see New Zealand triumph 17–13. Early in the match “Prentice electrified the spectators by lifting Sloman, the English fifteen stone front row man, clean off his feet”. The Auckland Star wrote that Prentice produced “superb defence and glorious tackling [and] took all on the principal that the bigger they are, the better they fall, and not once in the game did he fail New Zealand”. While the writer for the New Zealand Herald said “for tackling no one could wish to see a better exhibition than that given by Prentice, at second five-eighth. His all round play stamped him as one of the best backs on the side”. He had perhaps got under the skin of the Great Britain players as near the end of the match New Zealand received a penalty for a player “deliberately kicking Prentice… when at least ten yards away from the ball”. On 11 August Prentice played for Auckland against the Great Britain side but this time went down 26-15 before 25,000 spectators at Carlaw Park. He then played in the 2nd test at the Caledonian Ground in Dunedin before a crowd of 9,000. He was once again in the five-eighth position along with Wetherill. New Zealand a violent match 13–5 with Burgess being sent off and several players suffering facial injuries due to being struck by opponents. At one point “Prentice and Bowen were cautioned for rough play” after “fighting on the ground” with Frank Delgrosso being carried off the field on a stretcher as a result of this ‘incident’. Early in the match Prentice intercepted a pass and ran half the length of the field but nothing resulted in the play, a short time later he “put in a brilliant run and play was taken to the English twenty-five”. Then near halftime Prentice made “a brilliant run…to the line, but he was pushed out at the corner”. He was described as being in “great form” during that first half. The Otago Daily Times stated that “probably the best back on the New Zealand side was Prentice, who put in no end of clever work”. After the match Prentice required four stitches to “patch up an ear wound”. The third test was a more mild affair with Great Britain winning the match 6-5 and thus won the series 2–1. It was played at English Park in Christchurch before a crowd of 20,000 with the police turning away 3,000 more five minutes before kick off with the ground at capacity.

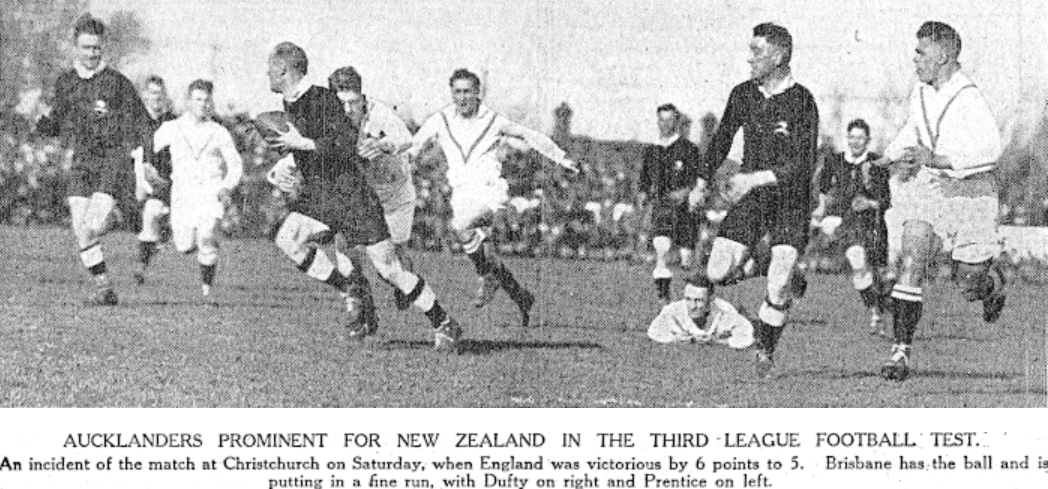
Prentice in the 3rd test supporting Hec Brisbane on the inside.

Prentice and Wetherill were said to have been “both as game as pebbles and as clever footballers as are found in the game [but] were peculiarly impotent against Rees and Parkin”. Prentice early in the match made a “fiery tackle of Gwynne…when England was looking a bit likely”. He had also followed up a kick well and tackled Sullivan in possession which forced a scrum. New Zealand gained a penalty which Craddock Dufty kicked to give New Zealand a 2–0 lead. Late in the match with the score at 6-5 Prentice was hurt in a tackle but was able to complete the match and it was whistled over a short while later. Prentice then returned to Auckland and finished the season playing 4 further matches for Richmond including the Labour Day tournament final loss to Marist Old Boys 12–5.

=== Continuation of Richmond career ===
In 1929 Prentice played 14 matches for Richmond. On 8 June, in a game against Newton, he broke his finger and had to leave the field but was able to resume playing a fortnight later. In June New Zealand international Lou Brown who was playing for Wigan at the time and was back in New Zealand for a holiday said that Prentice was spoken of very highly in England based on his games against the side the previous season. He said he thought he “may have been given a chance to go to England” to play professionally. Prentice was offered terms by Wigan and sent his own demands back which were accepted however he had difficulties in getting away from his position in New Zealand and ultimately stayed. In July he was selected in the reserves for Auckland against South Auckland but did not take the field with the selectors preferring Frank Delgrosso and Allan Seagar in the five eighths positions.

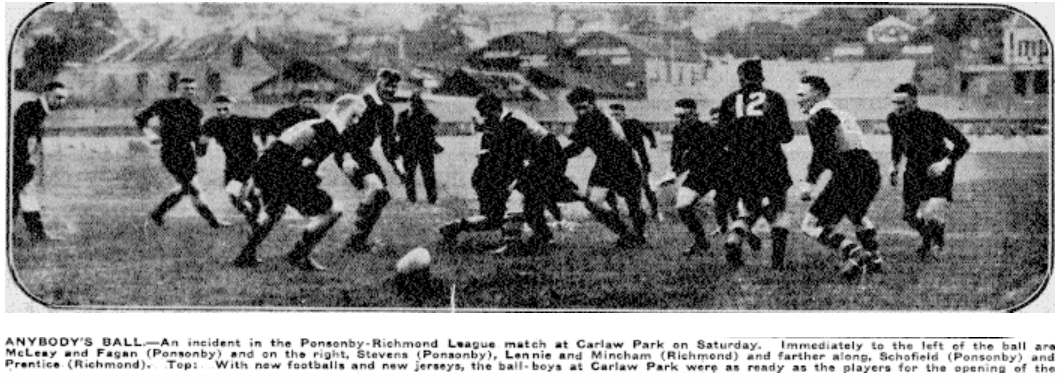
Prentice shown playing for Ponsonby v Richmond in Round 1 of 1930 at Carlaw Park. He is on the extreme right.

In 1930 he appeared in 16 matches for Richmond. They made the final of the Roope Rooster but went down to Ponsonby 15–7. In August he played for Auckland against New Zealand with Auckland losing 34–27. His season was also notable for the fact that he was playing for the Trotting Trainers in the Wednesday Business League. He played at least 2 matches for them including against the Private Taxis and the Barmen side and scored a try in each match.

1931 was an unusual year for Prentice as it was the only season in which he played no representative football. He was also in rare try scoring form, notching 10 tries from 14 matches for Richmond including 4 in a match against the Ellerslie-Otahuhu United side. The ten he gained during the season meant that he was the third highest try scorer in the Auckland senior competition matches for the 1931 season. Prior to this he had only scored 12 tries for Richmond through 72 matches. Two weeks before his 4 try performance Prentice had been sent off in a match with City Rovers after an “argument” with fellow New Zealand international Steve Watene who was also sent from the field. It was said that “both lads shook hands as they left the ground”. In 1932 Prentice played 9 matches for Richmond scoring 5 tries. After their 4 June match with Ponsonby it was feared that he had fractured his collarbone after receiving a “nasty knock”. He missed 3 matches but returned on 2 July for their match with Newton and then was selected for the Probables side to play the Possibles as a curtain-raiser for the Auckland – South Auckland match. His form was good enough to gain selection for the North Island team to play the South Island once again. His fellow five eighth for the match was Hec Brisbane while ex-All Black Bert Cooke who had recently joined Prentice at the Richmond club was in the centres. The North Island won 27–18 before a crowd of 15,000 at Carlaw Park. The Auckland Star described Prentice as being “too slow; in fact, [he] was so much out of position that in all attacking movements he was invariably excluded”. At the time Great Britain was touring New Zealand and Prentice missed selection for the series with Brisbane and Cooke both being selected in the five-eighth positions immediately following the inter-island match. Prentice then was shifted into the forwards and played lock for Richmond against City Rovers on 25 September. By this point in his career he was aged 29 but he still played the majority of his football in the five eighth position from this point onwards.

Tragedy struck the Richmond club on 4 October, when senior play Harry Johns died as the result of head injuries suffered in a boxing match at the Auckland Town Hall the previous evening. He had played junior football for Richmond from the age of 13 and was in his debut season for the senior side. Prentice was the captain of the Richmond side and was one of the pall bearers for the funeral with Johns casket being buried draped in Richmond colours at Waikumete Cemetery.

At the end of the season Prentice was chosen for the ‘Rest of Auckland’ side to play against Marist Old Boys in a charity benefit match for former player W. Hanlon who needed assistance to return with his family to New Zealand.

In 1933 Prentice played 18 matches for Richmond including the Roope Rooster final which they won 26–16 over City Rovers and the Stormont Shield match which they lost 12–7 to Devonport United. In September/October the St George, who had finished runners up in the 1933 NSW RFL toured New Zealand. Richmond played them twice with Prentice featuring in both matches. Richmond were victorious on 27 September by 13 points to 8, while on 14 October in their final tour match Richmond won again 5 points to 3. The first match between the sides was marred by violence throughout with “deliberate kicking and punching …indulged in, and the climax was reached when two opposing players stood over the side line on the terrace side and fought. Prentice was described as the “outstanding back” alongside Mitchell in the Richmond side where he played “a great defensive game”. In the second victory it was said that he, along with Roy Powell and Jack Satherley played fine games and “prevented the half-backs, [Richard] Daly and Carey from going far”. He was responsible for Richmond's only try of the match after kicking through from a scrum and with [Stan] Robinson injured he failed to secure the ball and Tony Milicich scored. Late in the season Prentice also played for Richmond in their Max Jaffe Cup game against Marist which was to decide the ‘best club team in Auckland’. Richmond won easily 31–8 with Prentice scoring 2 tries. He then played against the same opponent on 21 October in a match for the unemployed as New Zealand was in the midst of the Great Depression.

On 12 August Prentice played the first of 4 matches for Auckland during the season. They played North Auckland at Carlaw Park and won 28–13. On 26 August he played against West Coast in a 28–22 win before a week later being a part of the heavy 47–17 win over the touring Hawke's Bay side.

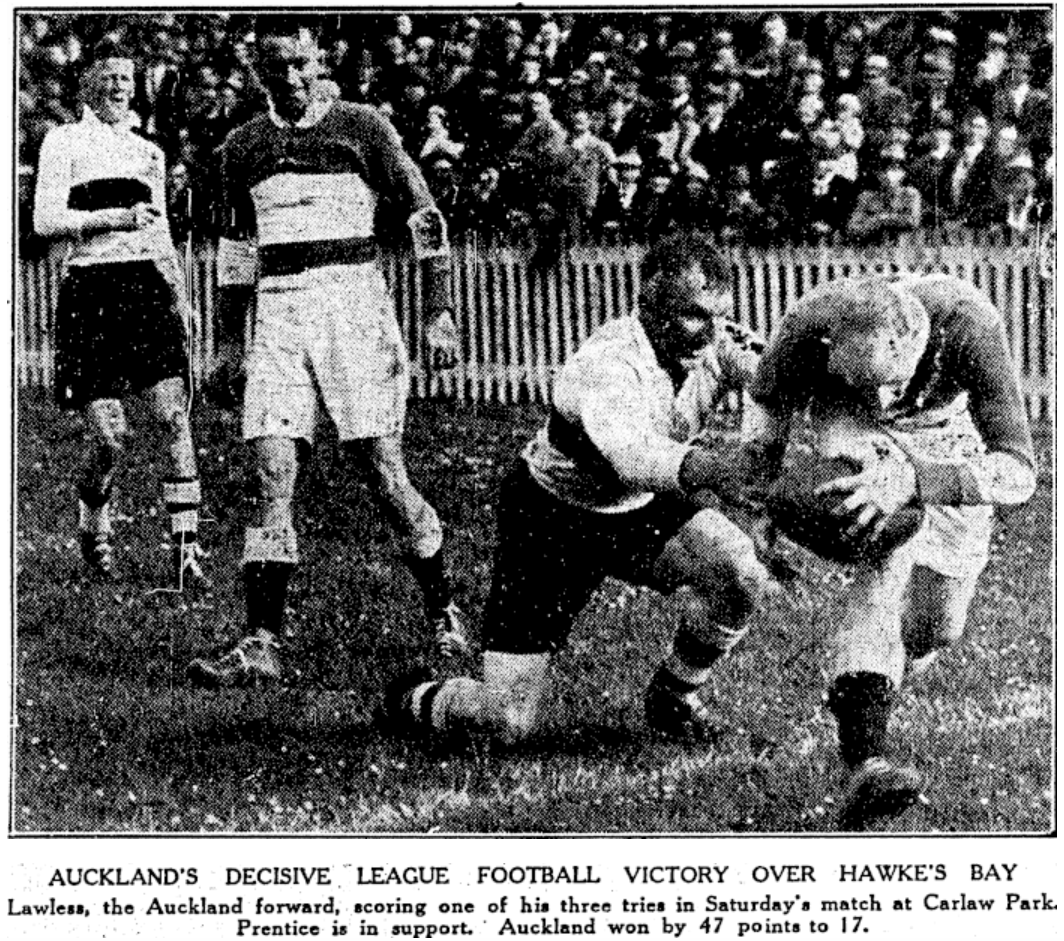

His final match for Auckland was against South Auckland and once more he was on the victorious side with Auckland winning 17–5. Prentice scored a try after Paki mis-kicked a loose ball which George Tittleton also missed and Prentice scooped it up and went over in the corner. The 1934 season began with reports in late April that he "underwent an operation for appendicitis recently, and, although he appears fit, he will probably not be in his best form for a time". He was ultimately fit to play in what was an historic season for Prentice and the Richmond club. He captained them in 21 games which saw the senior side win the Fox Memorial championship for the first time in their history, the Roope Rooster trophy with a final win over Marist, and the Stormont Shield final over Newton.

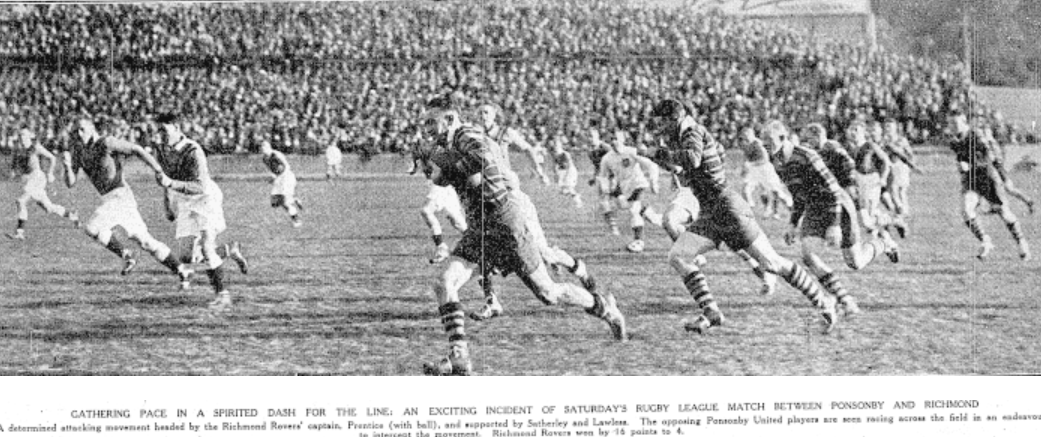
Prentice running with the ball in a 12 May match at Carlaw Park against Ponsonby before a crowd of 17,000.

This was the first time a club side had ever performed this feat in Auckland rugby league history to this point. In mid-August Richmond toured Taranaki and the Hawke's Bay where they played both local representative sides and lost 23–22 and won 37–11 respectively. In the match with Taranaki Prentice collided badly with the referee who received a cut over his eye. Then in October they played the touring Western Suburbs side from Sydney who were the 1934 NSW RFL champions there. Richmond won both games 18 - 16, and 10 - 3 respectively. In the second match it was said that Prentice and fellow five eighth Jack Satherley “broke the back of the Australian attack”.

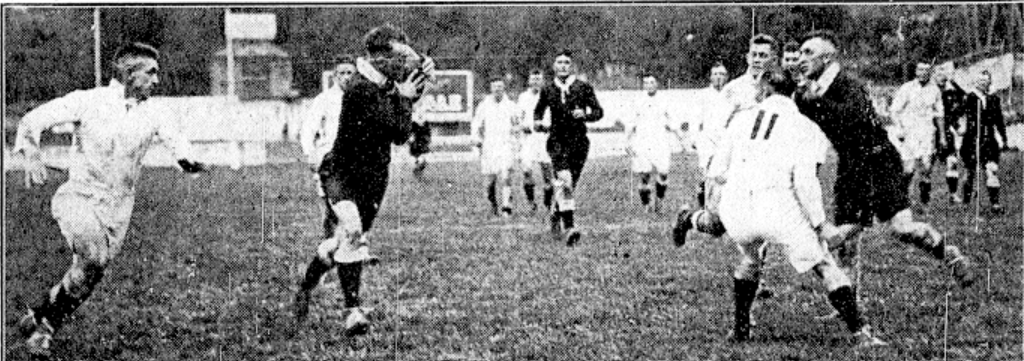
Prentice accepting a pass from Roy Powell in their 36-18 win over the South Island.

Earlier in the season, on 30 June, Prentice played for Auckland despite sustaining a rib injury the week prior in a match for Richmond against Ponsonby. Auckland won the 35–8 with Prentice scoring a try. Then on 1 September he played for the North Island versus the South Island in their annual fixture. This was the 4th time he had played in the match and he was to score the only try of what would eventually be 5 appearances for them. He was five eighth alongside Richmond teammate Bert Cooke who was captaining the side and it was said that they played like “clockwork” together. The North Island won comfortably 36-18 before a crowd of 9,000 at Carlaw Park. Prentice was involved in passing movements that led to the North Island's first two tries. He then threw the final pass for Wally Tittleton to cross for another try as the North side took a 21–3 lead. Towards the end of the match he took a pass from Tittleton and crossed for his own try. It was said after the match by The New Zealand Herald that he “played one of his best games and a pleasing feature was that he did not kick and lose possession”.

=== Return to the New Zealand side ===
1935 was to be Prentice's last season of rugby league. It was notable for the fact that he had seemingly retired at the beginning of the season for he did not debut for Richmond until 13 July, when they were playing their round 13 match against Marist where he scored a try in a 22–0 win. On 10 August he played in Richmond's Fox Memorial 14–9 final win over Mount Albert. A week later he played in North Island's 19–18 win over the South Island before then playing in the Roope Rooster competition which saw Richmond make the final but lose to Newton 10–8. A week later they had revenge with a 26–15 win over the same opponent in the Stormont Shield final.

Despite being 32 years old by this point of his career Prentice was still one of the outstanding five eighths in New Zealand and he was selected in the Auckland side to play the touring Australian side on 21 September. Auckland lost a hard-fought match by 16 points to 8 with Prentice partnering with Arthur Kay in the five eighth positions with Roy Powell at halfback. It was said that Prentice and Kay “made a fine defensive line” but needed more speed in moving up to tackle. Auckland's first try of the match came as the result of Prentice kicking well into the centre of the field where Mincham gained the ball and ran before feeding Lou Brown who beat defenders before finding Mincham again who scored.

Prentice had done enough in the New Zealand selectors eyes and was chosen to play in the first test against Australia on 28 September at Carlaw Park alongside Kay and Powell. It was his first time wearing the New Zealand jersey in 7 years after making his debut in 1928. Before a crowd of 20,000 at Carlaw Park, New Zealand surprised the visitors and won 22–16 after taking a 16–5 lead into half time. Kay and Prentice drove the attack forward before Calder and Glynn joined in with Glynn scoring to draw the teams level 3-3. It was said after the match that “the excellent tackling … of Prentice and Kay, was one of the features of the game. This in no small measure aided the team to gain a well-deserved victory”. Unfortunately for Prentice he suffered a leg injury during the match and despite initially being selected for the second test he was unable to play and was replaced in the side by recent rugby league convert, and ex-All Black Herbert Lilburne. The second test was played midweek on the Wednesday meaning Prentice had little time to regain fitness. New Zealand was soundly beaten by 29 points to 8. The following Saturday saw Prentice recalled to the side for the Third Test once again at Carlaw Park where he was joined by a new five-eighths partner in Brian Riley with Eric Fletcher at halfback. Australia proved much too strong again and won the series 2–1 with a decisive 31–8 victory before 20,000 spectators. Prentice once more showed “what a fine defensive five-eighth he is, and generally speaking, he performed well”. He also orchestrated New Zealand's first try which opened the scoring when he received the ball from a scrum near half-way and “cross-kicked with nice judgement … and Riley, following through fast, gathered in his stride and pranced across”. Then before halftime Harold Tetley and Prentice “were associated in a nice movement which carried play to the visitors’ line. Cliff Satherley snapped up in the loose, and was pulled down on the goal line. Prentice and Kay raced past McKinnon and Tetley returned the ball to Kay, and Riley raced over for a fine try”. Prentice's leg injury was still hampering him however and he was beaten by Norman multiple times during the match. It was said that “he could not move up fast enough to smother Norman, the brilliant Australian, who was the outstanding back on the ground. This was to be the last serious rugby league match that Prentice played in.

== Retirement and Coaching ==
Prentice had decided to retire following the 1935 season. He was named to play in the 23 May game for Richmond but did not take the field. Then in 1937 he was involved in an exhibition match between a Ponsonby XIII and a Huntly side in Swanson, West Auckland. He captained the Ponsonby side to a 13 to 2 win.

In 1938 Prentice was chosen to coach the Mount Albert United senior side with Tom Haddon as selector. On 30 July he took part in their exhibition match against Bay of Plenty in Rotorua which they won 29-9. He was their coach again in 1939 when they went on to win their inaugural Fox Memorial title. They also won the Stormont Shield trophy. He was also appointed the Auckland manager and coach in August for their fixture with South Auckland. He also coached the Auckland Pākehā team in their two matches with Auckland Māori and coached the same side in two more matches against the same opponent in 1940.

In both 1940 and 1941 he played for veteran teams in charity matches. In 1940 he represented the Auckland Veterans against the South Auckland Veterans in the final match of the season at Carlaw Park. The Auckland side was dubbed the ‘All Golds’ and he captained them to a 31–18 win. At the end of the game Prentice was presented with the Les Lees Challenge Cup. He played in the same fixture again in August 1941 though this time the match was played in Huntly with proceeds going to the local patriotic funds as World War 2 was well underway by this point. Then he was chosen in an N.Z.R.L. Old Boys side to take on South Auckland on 27 September. That season he had been appointed the Auckland representative selector along with Bill Cloke and A.J. McGregor. The same three were appointed Auckland selectors again in 1942. Prentice was again appointed coach of the Auckland side in 1948.

== Personal life ==
His mother, Helen, died suddenly at home at 68 Summer Street, Ponsonby aged 67 on 14 January 1924, and was buried at Hillsborough Cemetery, Hillsborough. According to the 1925 Electoral Roll, Prentice was working as a driver and living at 68 Summer Street in Ponsonby.

On 17 June 1931 Prentice married Alice Matilda McCready (known as “Lallie”). Stan Prentice died, whilst living in Māngere, on 31 December 1982, aged 79 and was buried on 5 January 1983.
