= Robert Mincham =

New Zealand international rugby league footballer

Personal information
- Full name: Robert Andrew Arnold Mincham
- Born: 8 March 1941 (age 84); New Zealand

Playing information

Rugby union
Representative
Years	Team	Pld	T	G	FG	P
1963	Auckland	2	0	0	0	0

Rugby league
- Position: Wing
Club
Years	Team	Pld	T	G	FG	P
1964	Glenora Bears
Representative
Years	Team	Pld	T	G	FG	P
	Auckland
1966–68	New Zealand	4	1	0	0	3
- Father: Ted Mincham

Robert Mincham is a New Zealand former rugby league footballer who represented New Zealand in the 1968 World Cup.

His father, Ted, was also a New Zealand international, while his grandfather, William Mincham played for Auckland and later became a senior club, and international referee.

== Playing career ==
Mincham played for the Glenora Bears in the Auckland Rugby League competition and was an Auckland representative. In 1966 he played one test match for the New Zealand national rugby league team.

In 1967 Mincham won the Tetley Trophy as the leading try scorer in the Auckland Rugby League competition when he scored 19 tries that season. He was not selected for the Kiwis in 1967 but in 1968 was named as part of the 1968 World Cup squad. Mincham played in three matches at the tournament.
