= Bert Cooke (rugby) =

NZ dual-code international rugby footballer

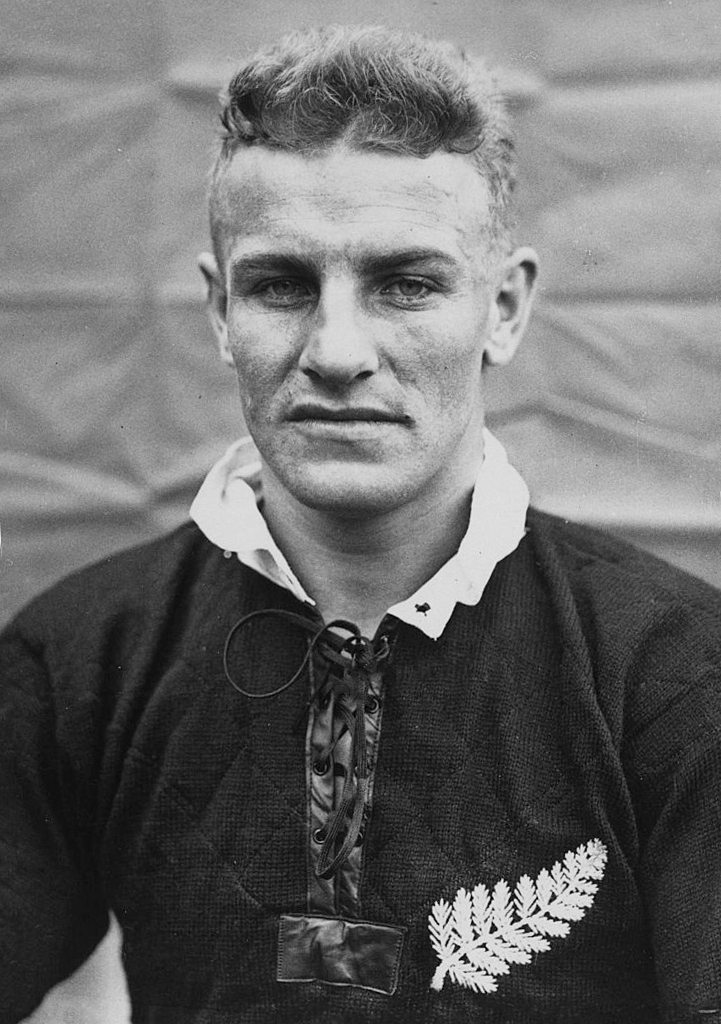
- Cooke in 1924

Personal information
- Full name: Albert Edward Cooke
- Born: 5 October 1901 Auckland, New Zealand
- Died: 29 September 1977 (aged 75) Auckland, New Zealand

Playing information
- Height: 1.75 m (5 ft 9 in)
- Weight: 61.6 kg (136 lb)

Rugby union
- Position: Second five-eighth
Club
| Years | Team | Pld | T | G | FG | P |
|---|---|---|---|---|---|---|
| 1923–1925 | Grafton RFC |
| 1927–29 | Masterton Old Boys |
| 1930 | Hutt (Wellington) |
| | Total | 0 | 0 | 0 | 0 | 0 |
Representative
| Years | Team | Pld | T | G | FG | P |
| 1923–25 | Auckland | 17 | 19 | 11 | 0 | 81 |
| 1924 | Auckland XV | 1 | 2 | 0 | 0 | 6 |
| 1924–30 | New Zealand | 44 (8) | 39 (4) | 3 | 0 | 123 (12) |
| 1926 | Hawke's Bay | 5 | 10 | 0 | 0 | 30 |
| 1927–29 | Wairarapa | 34 | 31 | 16 | 2 | 132 |
| 1931–32 | Hawke's Bay |
| 1930 | Wellington |

Rugby league
- Position: Fullback, Centre, Stand-off
Club
| Years | Team | Pld | T | G | FG | P |
|---|---|---|---|---|---|---|
| 1932–35 | Richmond Rovers | 50 | 18 | 9 | 0 | 72 |
| 1932 | Ponsonby United XIII | 1 | 3 | 0 | 0 | 9 |
| | Total | 51 | 21 | 9 | 0 | 81 |
Representative
| Years | Team | Pld | T | G | FG | P |
| 1932–35 | Auckland | 12 | 13 | 0 | 0 | 39 |
| 1932–35 | North Island | 3 | 7 | 0 | 0 | 21 |
| 1932–35 | New Zealand | 5 | 2 | 0 | 0 | 6 |

Coaching information
Representative
| Years | Team | Gms | W | D | L | W% |
| 1935-36 | Ponsonby United | 36 | 19 | 1 | 16 | 53 |
| 1936 | Auckland | 3 | 1 | 0 | 2 | 33 |

Albert Edward Cooke (5 October 1901 – 29 September 1977) was a New Zealand dual-code international rugby footballer of the 1920s and 1930s, who represented for New Zealand in both rugby union and rugby league.

== Early years ==
Born in Auckland in 1901, Cooke was the son of Albert Edward Cooke, a hairdresser, and his wife Sarah Jane Cooke (née Peterson). Cooke was educated at Hamilton East Primary and Hamilton Boys' High School.

== Rugby union career ==
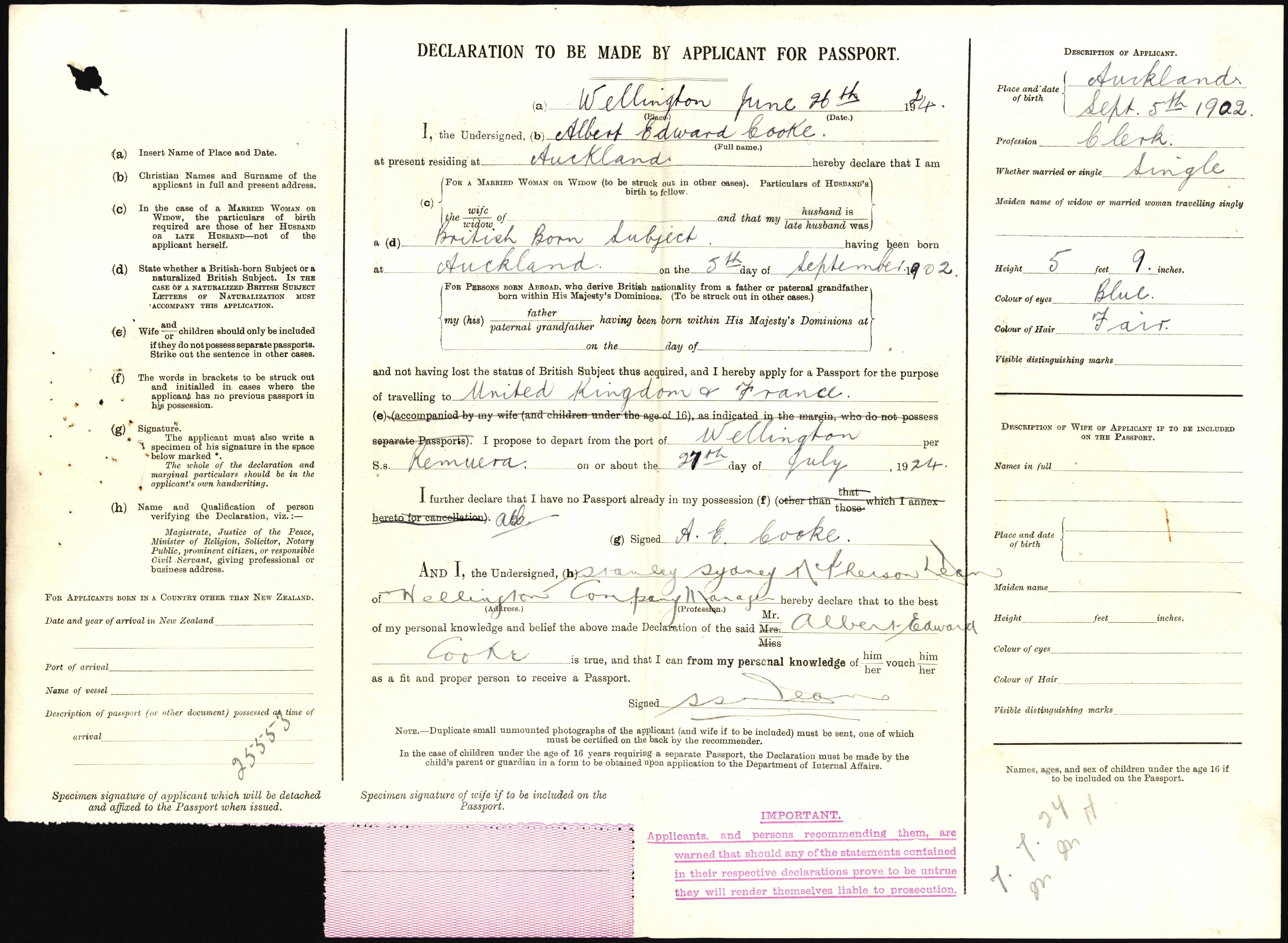
Albert Cook passport application (1924)

Cooke joined the Grafton rugby union club in 1919 and graduated to senior club rugby in 1923. In that same year he made his Auckland debut and was a reserve for New Zealand against New South Wales. He was then part of the 1924–1925 "Invincibles" side that toured Great Britain. He again played for the All Blacks in 1925 and 1926 but withdrew from the 1928 tour of South Africa for business reasons. He did play twice in 1928 for New Zealand against New South Wales before making his last Test appearances in 1930 against Great Britain.

Cooke played for the North Island in 1931 and spent 1932 with Hawke's Bay, before switching codes. Cooke also represented Wairarapa and Wellington while playing rugby union. He finished his rugby union career with 121 tries in 131 first class matches.

== Rugby league career ==
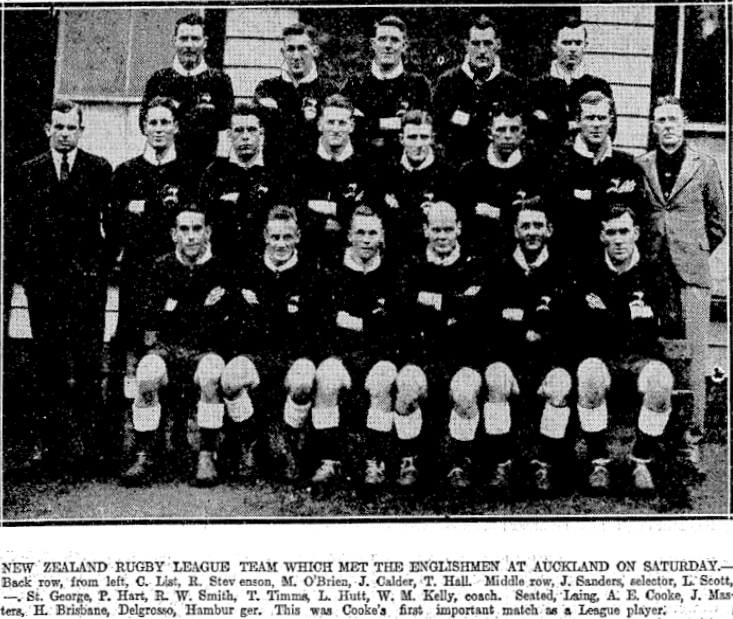

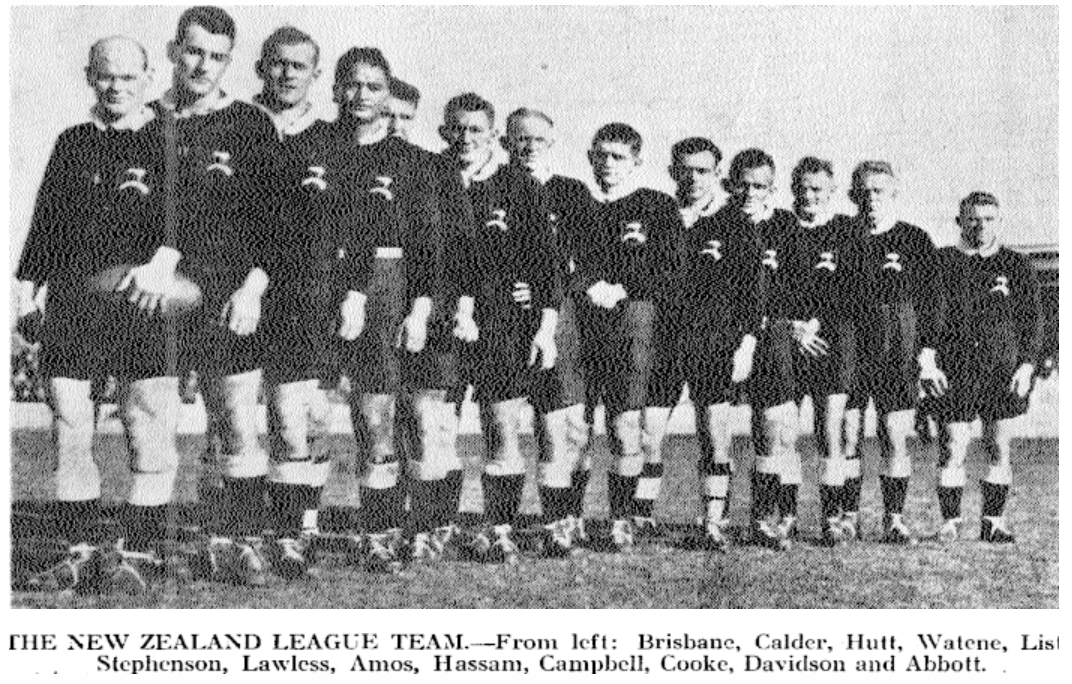

Cooke in fact played rugby league at the age of 15 for the Telegraph Messengers junior grade club which was affiliated to Ponsonby United. In 1917 he played in their 6th grade side. Cooke joined the Richmond Rovers club in the Auckland Rugby League competition in 1932 and made an immediate impact, racing away for three tries in the inter-island game only weeks later.

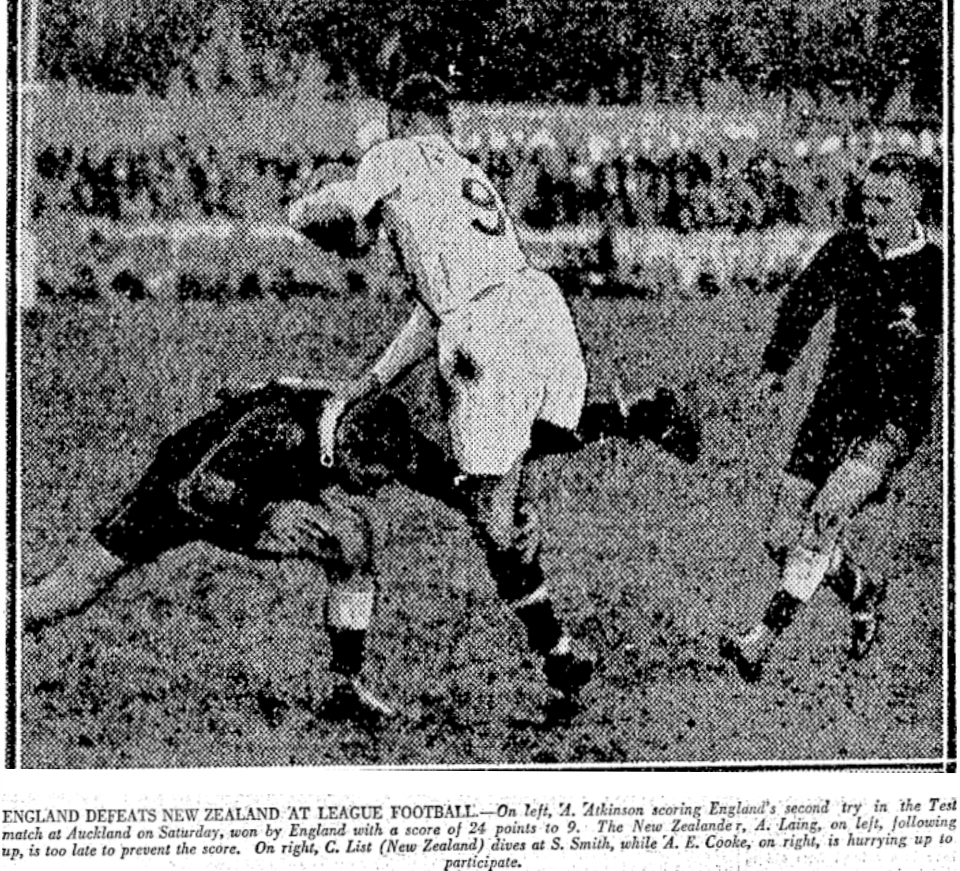
Cooke approaching as Claude List tackles Stanley Smith in the first test at Carlaw Park in 1932.

He was selected for New Zealand that year against the Great Britain Lions. Cooke also represented Auckland and captained New Zealand in two Test matches against Australia in 1935.

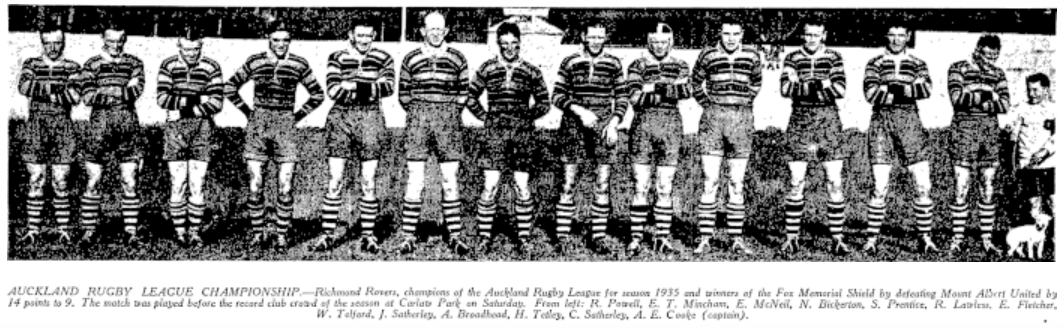

He coached Auckland in 1936 as well as coaching the Ponsonby United senior side after he retired from playing with Richmond Rovers club the previous year. In the 1936 season the Ponsonby side finished with a 7 win, 6 loss record, coming 5th in the Fox Memorial competition. They were knocked out of the Roope Rooster in the first round of the same season but then went on to win the Phelan Shield after defeating Mount Albert, Papakura, Devonport, and Marist (in the final). In 1937 he was said to be going to coach Ponsonby once more but was rumoured to be going to coach the North Shore Rugby senior side as well. Ultimately he in fact came out of retirement and played two matches for Richmond Rovers before being injured in their round 1 match with Mount Albert and then giving the game away as a player. He then took on the coaching duties of the backs with the North Shore rugby senior side in 1937 with Geo. Sutton and again with Tom Lawn who coached the forwards in 1938 to 4th in the Auckland First Division Championship. He coached them again in 1939.

== Later years ==
With the outbreak of World War II, Cooke joined the Royal New Zealand Air Force and played rugby union for that service in the 1940 Auckland club competition. He died in Auckland in 1977.
