= Frank Halloran (rugby league) =

New Zealand international rugby league player

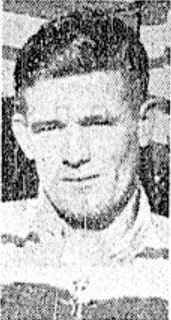

Personal information
- Full name: Richard Francis Halloran
- Born: 11 November 1912 Auckland, New Zealand
- Died: 2 August 1980 (aged 67) Auckland, New Zealand

Playing information
- Weight: 69 kg (10 st 12 lb)
- Position: Halfback, Fullback, Stand-off
Club
Years	Team	Pld	T	G	FG	P
1928–33	Northcote & Birkenhead Ramblers
1934–38	Ponsonby United	77	11	2	0	37
	Total	77	11	2	0	37
Representative
Years	Team	Pld	T	G	FG	P
1935	Auckland Colts	1	0	0	0	0
1935	Auckland Trial	1	0	0	0	0
1936	Auckland	1	0	0	0	0
1936–1937	New Zealand Trial	2	0	1	0	2
1937	New Zealand	2	0	0	0	0

Frank Halloran was a rugby league footballer who played in Auckland, New Zealand. He represented Auckland and made the New Zealand team in 1937, playing two tests against Australia at halfback. When doing so he became the 250th player to represent New Zealand. Halloran played for the Ponsonby United (Ponies) club in the Auckland Rugby League competition from 1934 to 1938. Prior to this he had played for the Northcote & Birkenhead Ramblers club as a junior. He later fought in World War 2.

== Early life ==
Frank Halloran was born on 11 November 1912, to Richard Francis Halloran (1876-1956), and Lilian Knox (1889-1961). He was one of 15 children with his other siblings being Evelyn Frances Halloran (1907-?), Josephine Halloran (1909-1913), Myrtle Lilian Halloran (1910-1976), Barbara Kate Halloran (1914-?), Esma Mary Halloran (1916-2003), John Haslett Halloran (1918-2001), Thomas Walter Halloran (1921-2007), Phillip Halloran (1923-2002), Joan Augusta Halloran (1925-2001), William Mervyn Halloran (1926-2001), Robert Halloran (1927-1991), Patricia Moria Halloran (1930-2015), Colleen Halloran (1934-1934), and Maureen Halloran (1935-2016).

The first mention of Frank in the local newspapers was in the Auckland Star and New Zealand Herald on 11 January 1926, when he nearly drowned at Brown's Island in Auckland's Hauraki Gulf. He was aged 13 at the time and was there as part of the Colonial Sugar Refinery Company's annual picnic for employees. He "fell into the water, and was in serious difficulties when Mr. Charles Neads, jumped in fully clothed as he was and brought the boy to safety".

== Playing career ==
=== Northcote & Birkenhead Ramblers ===
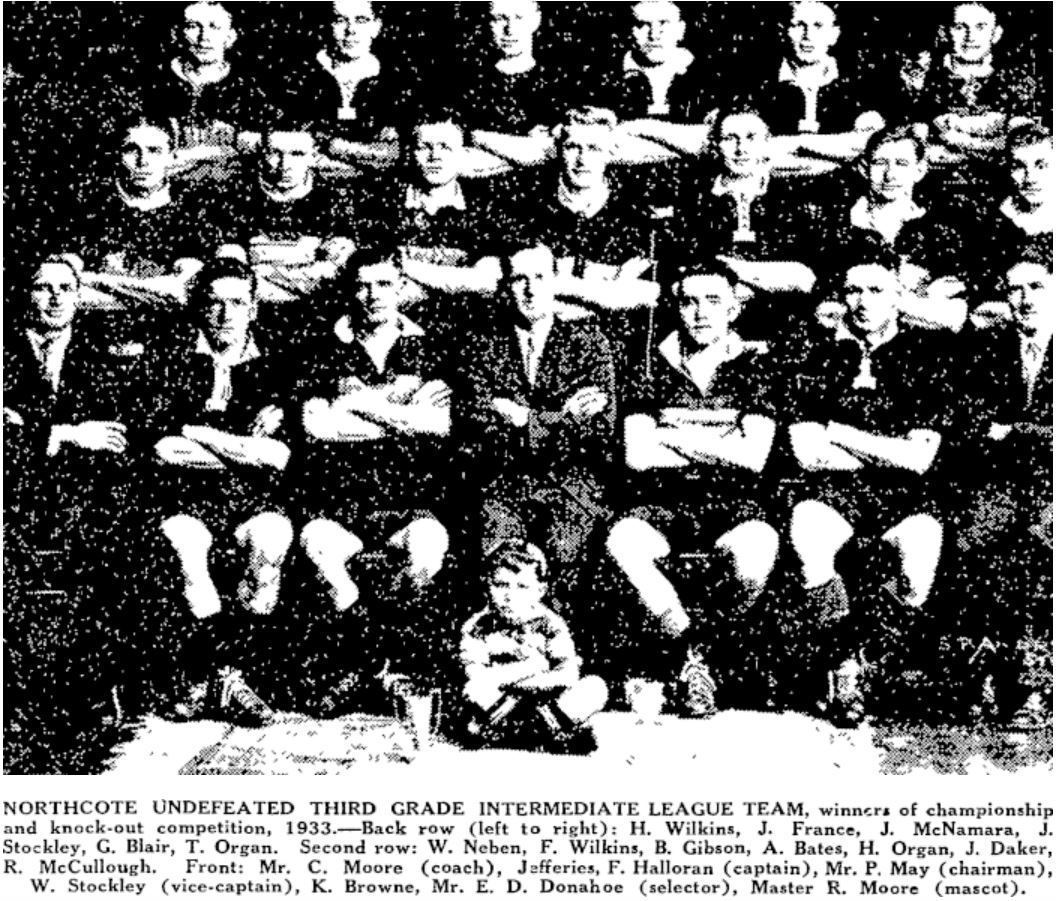
1933 Northcote 3rd Grade Int. champions, Halloran (captain) is front row, centre.

Halloran began his rugby league playing career at the Northcote & Birkenhead Ramblers club which was based in the Northcote, and Birkenhead suburbs of Auckland's North Shore. His name appeared for the first time in association with the game on 25 May in 1928, in the Sixth Grade A competition. Northcote finished at the bottom of the competition. The following year in 1929 Halloran was still playing in the same side. The team fared better, winning around half of their matches to finish in the top half of the competition. In 1930 Halloran had moved up to Northcote's 5th grade side which finished mid table once more. In 1931 Halloran had progressed into the 4th grade side which performed well winning most of its games and finishing near the top of a 15 team competition.

The 1933 season was where Halloran began to make a name for himself. He was now aged 20 and became the captain of the Northcote 3rd grade intermediate team. They won the championship with an undefeated season scoring a remarkable 346 points and only conceded 6 which all came from penalty kicks. The team was pictured in the Auckland Star. In mid July Halloran applied for financial assistance on behalf of the club for their trip to Taranaki on 5 August. The side intended to play against the Taranaki junior side as a curtain-raiser to the Auckland match with Taranaki. The Auckland Rugby League decided to assist the team.

=== Transfer to Ponsonby United ===
At the start of the 1934 season Frank Halloran was granted a transfer to the Ponsonby United club. At the time Northcote's highest graded side was their 3rd grade intermediate team while Ponsonby had a long established senior side in the 1st grade Fox Memorial competition. Halloran moved there along with his teammates from Northcote, brothers John and Walter (Wally) Stockley with all three moving straight into the 1st grade side. Walter would go on to represent Auckland 5 times. John was killed in action on 24 December 1943, during World War 2 while in Italy aged 31.

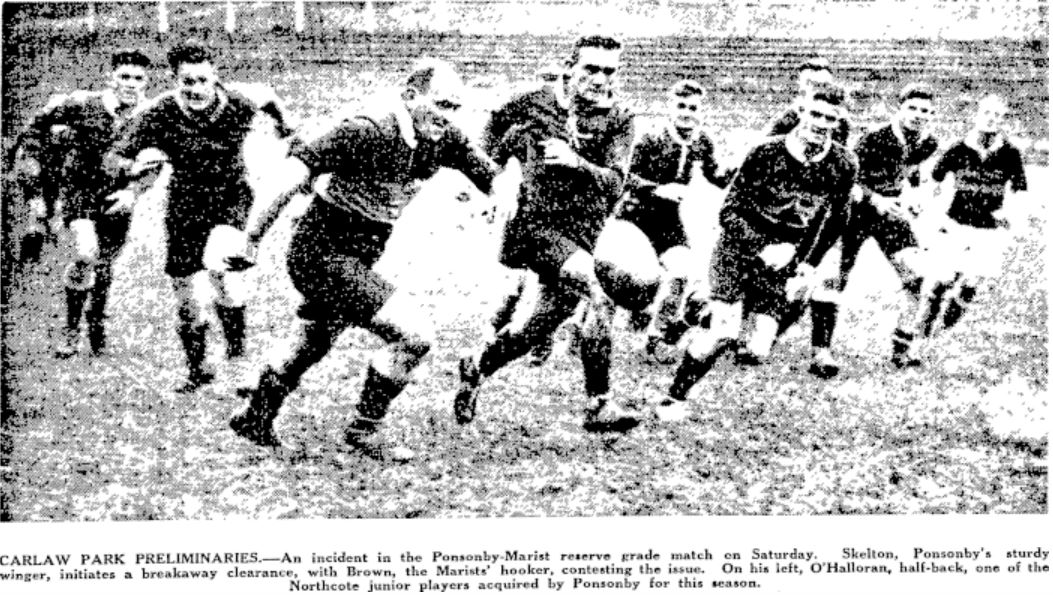
Halloran, slightly to the right of the ball chasing Pat Skelton (Ponsonby) and Brown (Marist).

The first match Halloran played for Ponsonby was in a pre-season game against Marist Old Boys on 21 April at Carlaw Park. His first official match came in round 1 of the Fox Memorial first grade championship on 28 April at Carlaw Park. Ponsonby won 28–8 with Halloran playing well. The Herald wrote:"Halloran, a junior player from Northcote, was the best back on the ground, usually a centre, Halloran played a fine game behind the scrum. His passes were well directed, and he varied his methods to combine with the forwards". The Auckland Star said that he "made a very promising debut at half-back, and when he opened up the play, [Brian] Riley and [Walter] Stockley with clever, incisive running gave the Ponsonby three-quarter line plenty of opportunities". In comments later in the week the Herald wrote that he "played a fine game behind the Ponsonby pack. He was responsible for at least three of the tries scored. Halloran, who played for Northcote juniors last year at fullback, is a natural scrum half. His passes were well directed and he frequently joined the three-quarters in passing bouts". Then the following week in a 17–2 win over Devonport United the Herald said "great credit for Ponsonby's success must be given to Halloran, halfback, and W. Stockley, first five eighths. Both are players well above the average, Halloran changing his play cleverly and getting the ball away very smartly". In another article it was predicted that his play "stamps him as a coming representative player". The following week Ponsonby lost to Richmond 16-4 and Halloran had "more limited opportunities than usual [but] was still a notable half-back- a quick thinker, resourceful and varied in his methods". The matches were played before a crowd of 17,000 to mark the opening of the new grandstand at Carlaw Park. He "played another fine game... although he had a tendency to overdo the blind side play". In a narrow 8–5 win over Newton Rangers credit for their win went to their "better understanding between Halloran, at halfback, and the five eighths, their combination being good".

His first try came in an 18–4 win over City on 26 May in round 5. Though it was noted that both he and Walter Stockley "were not as prominent as usual". In a convincing 16–7 win against Marist he was "always resourceful at halfback" and "played a fine game behind the pack in the second half. On every occasion he fed the backs to good advantage". On 11 June he "overshadowed G. Rhodes, the Devonport halfback by his enterprise", but Ponsonby still lost 10–0. A week later they lost again, this time to Richmond 26–10 with Halloran moved to fullback for the first time. The Herald said that he "played a poor game, hesitating far too much and being frequently caught in possession. His kicking was weak and often lacked height and direction". They noted that his replacement at halfback, Owen Wilkie didn't play as well there as Halloran does. The Herald wrote later in the week that Ponsonby's backline formation change was a "mistake". In an 12–11 loss to Newton Rangers he again played fullback and "played in a far more settled fashion... but can do much better". In his third consecutive match at fullback, in a 22–10 loss to City Rovers he "played a sound game... his fielding being very certain". The next week he was moved back to halfback in Ponsonby's 11–7 win over Marist Old Boys at the Onehunga Recreation Ground (Waikaraka Park). Halloran and Brian Riley "did the inside work very capably". In round 12 Ponsonby won 6–5 over Devonport with "Halloran, at halfback, the outstanding player. His clever work on attack frequently placed the backs in good positions, and each time his passes were well directed". The Herald went on to say that "the splendid all-round play of Halloran, behind the Ponsonby scrum, was a feature of the game. His passes were well directed, and he ran straight, giving the inside backs room to work. Halloran was given a lot of support from [Lou] Hutt...". In the last round of the championship Ponsonby lost to the champions Richmond Rovers 18–0. In regard to Halloran's head to head match with Roy Powell, a future New Zealand halfback, it was said that he "was more than his equal". He "shaped magnificently" with Riley, Stockley, and Kay in the early stages. The Herald said that he was "unlucky to be passed over by the selectors for the representative match next Saturday". The match being referred to was the 11 August game between Auckland and Northland. The herald said that Vincent Axman was a surprise inclusion at halfback and that "Halloran, the young Ponsonby half, has shown better all-round form during the season and can be accounted unlucky to miss selection". He was included in the match day squad amongst the reserves but was not required to play on the day.

His next match was Ponsonby's 19–11 win over Mount Albert in round 1 of the Roope Rooster knockout competition on 18 August. Halloran and Brian Riley "formed a dangerous combination in attack". He missed their remaining knockout games though no reason was reported in any of the newspapers.

He did however play in the Ponsonby XIII side's match against the touring Western Suburbs side from Sydney which had won the New South Wales competition. Western Suburbs won 26 to 13 in the 3 October match. The Auckland Star said that "Halloran, behind the scrum, was patchy, but improved as the game progressed". He had played opposite Percy Williams who played for New South Wales, and later represented Australia. Early in the match Halloran was penalised and Williams kicked the goal from the infringement. His last match of the season came in a game for the Auckland Colts representative side which was playing Auckland Māori (Tāmaki) on 20 October at Carlaw Park. The Colts side won 29–12 with Halloran scoring a try "at the end of a loose rush".

The 1935 season saw Halloran play 16 matches for Ponsonby, scoring 3 tries. He also played in an Auckland trial match. He was listed at halfback for Ponsonby's season opener against Marist on 4 May. In Ponsonby's round 3 thrashing of City by 39 to 13, Halloran was accused of being "inclined to run too much with the ball" from halfback. The next week in a loss to Richmond he "played a good game at halfback, starting his backs smartly and doing great work on defence". In a summation of the players in form in the Auckland competition the Herald said that there was "plenty of talent offering for the position of halfback for the representative team. Halloran, Ponsonby, and Wilfred Brimble, Newton, are both playing well". Ponsonby lost to Mount Albert in round 6 with the Auckland Star reporting that "despite the good work of Halloran and Riley as off-half, erratic handling and defects in positional play lost advantages". While the Herald said he "played a good game behind the scrum". Then in an 8–3 win over Marist in round 8 on 22 June he "varied his play as half ..., and his vis-à-vis Kerr, revealed quite good form".

Halloran was occasionally being listed at fullback and he played there in their 14–13 loss to Newton at the Glen Eden Recreation Ground in Glen Eden. He "played a safe game" in the position. He didn't play in their match against Devonport United in round 13, before moving back to halfback for their 17–11 loss to Mount Albert United the following week. He "did a lot of useful work behind the scrum...".

Halloran was named as a reserve in an Auckland trial match to help the selectors choose the Auckland side to face the touring Australian side. However following the next round of club matches he was named to start in the Auckland A trial team to play the Auckland B trial side. The selectors were Ernie Asher, Bert Avery, and William Mincham. The match was played as curtain raiser to the North Island – South Island inter-island match. He was chosen at halfback with Eric Fletcher and Ted Brimble outside him at first five eighth and second five eighths. He was also playing opposite Ted Brimble's younger brother, Wilfred at halfback for the B team. The A team won 22–19 with Halloran replaced at halftime by A.S. O'Connor of Wellington in a pre-arranged move so that the New Zealand selectors could see him play.

After not having scored a try all season Halloran then went on a try scoring run, scoring his first in Ponsonby's Roope Rooster round 1 defeat to City (28-16) on 24 August. The newspapers contradicted one another with the Auckland Star saying Halloran "was in fine fettle behind the Ponsonby pack" but the New Zealand Herald said he "was a weak link" behind the scrum. He scored his next try in Ponsonby's 20–10 win over City in the Phelan Shield semi finals on 7 September. His third try came in their last match of the season a week later which was the Phelan Shield final win over Mount Albert by 11 points to 8.

=== Auckland Representative (1936 season) ===
The 1936 season saw Halloran play 19 games for Ponsonby, scoring 5 tries, while he also went on to make his one and only appearance for the Auckland representative side against Wellington. He also appeared in the New Zealand trial match on 11 July. The Ponsonby team was to be coached by the recently retired All Black legend and New Zealand rugby league representative, Bert Cooke.

Ponsonby's first game of the season was against City on 18 April at Carlaw Park in a preseason match, with Halloran scoring a try. The Auckland Star said that Ponsonby's "success was largely due to the efforts of Halloran and Kay, the former being responsible for at least three of his side's five tries", and they were their "best backs". In a round 1 loss to Richmond by 21 points to 10, Halloran scored a try, and at halfback he "played a good game, his all-round form being reminiscent of that which made him outstanding three seasons ago". He scored again when Ponsonby beat City 21–10 on the Carlaw Park #2 field the following week. He along with Walter Stockley, and Brian Riley combined very well "with machine gun like play and perfect understanding". He scored for the fourth consecutive match when Ponsonby beat Manukau 24–18 and was said to have done "useful work on defence" along with Stockley.

In another win, this time over Mount Albert (22-20), the Herald wrote that Ponsonby's backs "were dangerous and were not afraid to make play for themselves. A great deal of credit in this respect must go to Halloran, the Ponsonby halfback, and Riley, who was in brilliant form at second five eighths". They went on to comment that "at half, [he] is a much improved player and he did invaluable work both on attack and defence". During the week they stated that Halloran was "showing splendid form this season and must have claims for representative honours". He "attacked with sharpness" the following week in a 16–11 loss to Marist. His good form continued against Newton where they won 22–10. The entire back line played well together with Halloran playing "a splendid game behind the scrum and sent out clean passes". He was involved in a try to Payne from halfway where he handled multiple times. The Herald noted what a "fine display" he had given and how he "worked the open side cleverly when possible". Halloran gave "another fine exhibition" at halfback in a 17–15 win over Devonport on 13 June. In the first match of the second round against Richmond, Ponsonby lost 15-6 though Halloran was Ponsonby's "best back and he again played a good all-round game". He made an opening for Walter Stockley to score Ponsonby's first try.

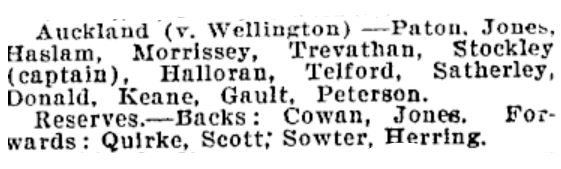

Halloran was then selected to make his Auckland debut against Wellington. It was not a full strength Auckland side as the match was a curtain raiser to the Auckland Pākehā match against Auckland Māori (Tāmaki) with both sides featuring a huge number of New Zealand and Auckland representatives. Halloran was chosen by selector Bert Avery at halfback to play alongside his Ponsonby teammate Walter Stockley who captained the side. He played opposite Wellington halfback, J. Coman who was a former Wellington rugby union representative player. Auckland won the early match 25–22 with the Herald publishing a photograph of Halloran shaping to kick after gaining possession from a scrum inside their own half. With the scores tied 3-3 Halloran was involved in a passing movement after Ross Jones gathered the ball and gave it to J. Peterson who passed to Halloran, who gave it on to Stockley who scored.

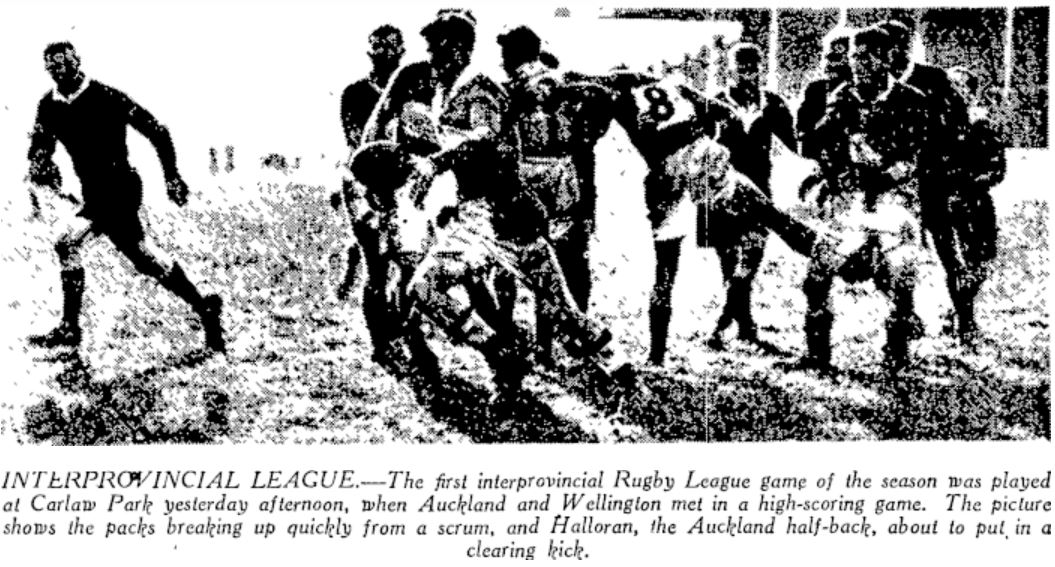

Halloran then returned to his Ponsonby side to play two matches against City and Manukau before being named in a New Zealand trial match. In the game against Manukau he "played solidly behind the pack". He was named in the reserves for both teams by Bert Avery for the trial match, which was to give himself and fellow New Zealand selectors Jim Amos and Thomas McClymont a chance to see the talent. The game was the curtain raiser to the North Island v South Island inter-island match at Carlaw Park on 11 July. At halftime Halloran came on to replace Roy Powell at halfback in the New Zealand A team. He converted a try scored by Angus Gault towards the end of the game with his team losing 16–13.

In Ponsonby's round 11 loss to Mount Albert (10-4) on 18 July "Halloran worked hard throughout behind the pack". The next week in a 9–8 win over Marist he was "outstanding". The Auckland Star writing that Ponsonby dominated the first half "with Halloran shining, getting the ball away quick and snappy". He made an opening for Arthur Kay early in the match before two other players handled to score.

Halloran was selected to train as a reserve for the New Zealand team which was preparing for the first test against England on 8 August. The other reserves named were Angus Gault, Harold Tetley, and Ted Mincham. There were no substitutions permitted during the test match but "in view of the very solid training operations, reserves are required to be on hand so that replacement caused by accident or indisposition to any of the first string may be filled by fully-trained reserves familiar with the team's tactics". He was ultimately not required to play with Roy Powell retaining his place in the starting side.

Halloran then returned to the Ponsonby team to finish the season playing six further matches. He scored a try in a 19-15 Phelan Shield semi final win over Devonport on 26 September. He was playing at first five eighth with D. Black at halfback. His final match of the year was in the Phelan Shield final win over Marist 13–9 on 3 October with him being listed once again at first five eighth.

=== New Zealand selection (1937) ===
The 1937 season was to see Halloran fulfil his promise and make his New Zealand debut. He played 20 games for Ponsonby, scoring 2 tries along with a New Zealand trial match before playing in both tests against Australia.

Halloran was mentioned in early January as having placed second in a dinghy race at the annual regatta at Maraetai, behind "L. Riley" which was possibly Leonard Riley who had played rugby league for Auckland and Ponsonby from 1922 to 1933 and was the older brother of teammate Brian Riley. He began his season for Ponsonby playing in both of their preliminary round matches against Mount Albert United on 17 April, and Richmond Rovers on 24 April. In the first match Halloran was the "shining light" along with Walter Stockley in the backs. And he was "the best of the five eighths". Against Richmond he "did useful work in defence" along with Arthur Kay. In their season opening match with City, Halloran "played a sound game", and "made several clever openings" playing at first five eighth with D. Black at halfback.

After a 27–0 win over Newton on 8 May, Halloran was selected by Hec Brisbane as a back reserve for the Auckland Pākehā team to play Auckland Māori on 12 May but he was ultimately not required to play. In Ponsonby's next match, a 7–3 win over Manukau the Herald wrote that he and Stockley were "too flat footed" with Halloran "often taking his passes from the halfback standing". In an 8–8 draw with North Shore he scored a try and "although... [he] mishandled on occasions, he was a tower of strength on defence". In a 15–6 loss to Richmond he and Black "got through a wealth of good work, although [Halloran] had a bad lapse when he let Noel Bickerton beat him badly and go on to score a magnificent try" which came after he dummied and left Halloran standing.

On 19 June six of the Auckland sides travelled to various parts of the North Island to play local sides in an effort to promote the rugby league game. Ponsonby went to Wellington, and played the St George (Wellington) club side at Newtown Park. The match was drawn 20–20 with Halloran playing first five eighth once more. He initiated a try to Selwyn Davis when they trailed 15-0 which partially sparked their comeback to later draw the match. In a 27–8 win over City he and Stockley "played sound football without doing anything unorthodox". Then in an upset 10–9 win over eventual champions, Richmond, Halloran "was outstanding for the winners, sending the ball away splendidly and defending soundly". The Herald said that he was Ponsonby's "best back" and he was "very nippy on attack and a tower of strength on defence". Later in the week the same newspaper wrote that "his tackling and covering on defence saved his side repeatedly, while he showed cleverness on attack and was responsible for Ponsonby's second try". A week later in round 11 though Ponsonby lost 18–6 to Manukau with Halloran and Stockley "hampered by the fast raiding" Manukau forwards which included Puti Tipene (Steve) Watene, Len Kawe, Frank Pickrang, and Angus Gault.

He was then named in the New Zealand trial match on 28 July where he was chosen in the Possibles team at halfback despite having played the entire season to this point at first five eighth. Outside him at first five eighth was Noel Bickerton, while he was playing opposite Peter Mahima from the Manukau club. His Possibles side won 25 to 11 in intermittent rain on a "quagmire" at Carlaw Park. The Auckland Star wrote "Mahima and Halloran provided a sharp contrast in half-back play, the former rugged and solid, the latter showing refreshing enterprise in attack". While the Herald suggested that "behind the scrum, Halloran was a better player on the day than Mahima. The former has played at five eighths all the season, but yesterday he did a lot of clever work behind the scrum. However Mahima has proved the outstanding halfback in club football and may yet be the test player". Halloran then returned to the Ponsonby side 3 days later on 31 July. They lost 20–0 to Mount Albert and their backs "gave a disappointing display, Riley and Halloran being the best".

==== New Zealand test selection ====
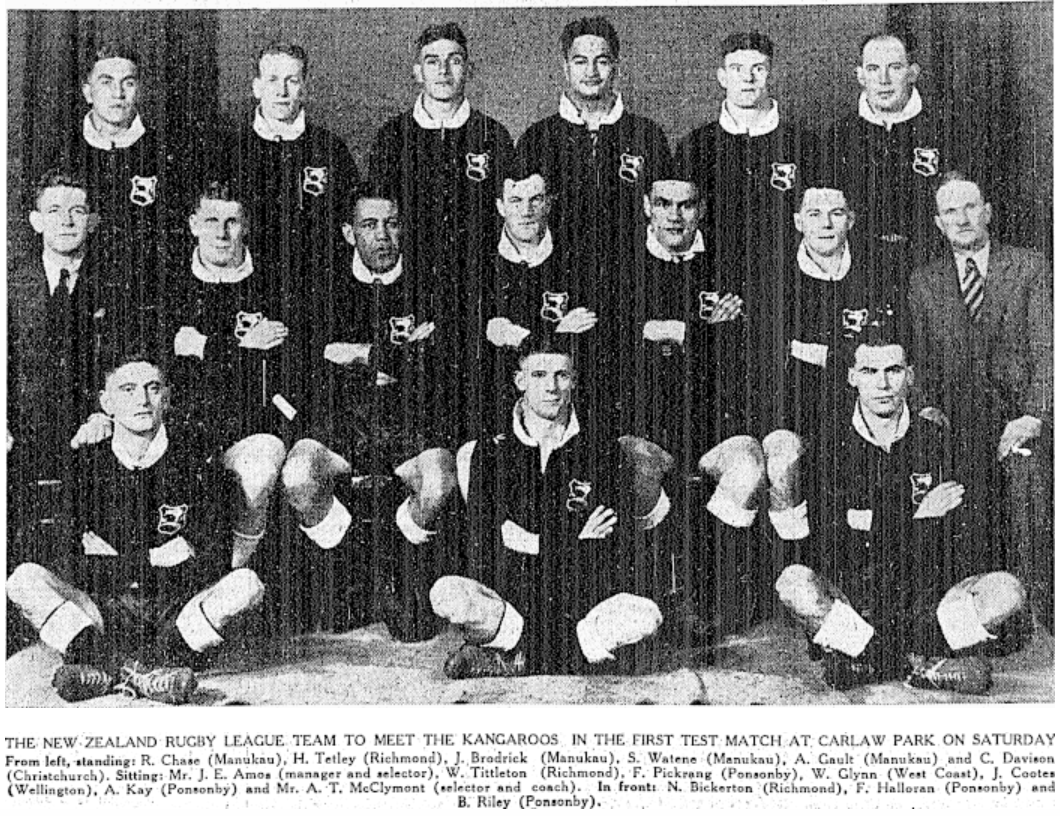

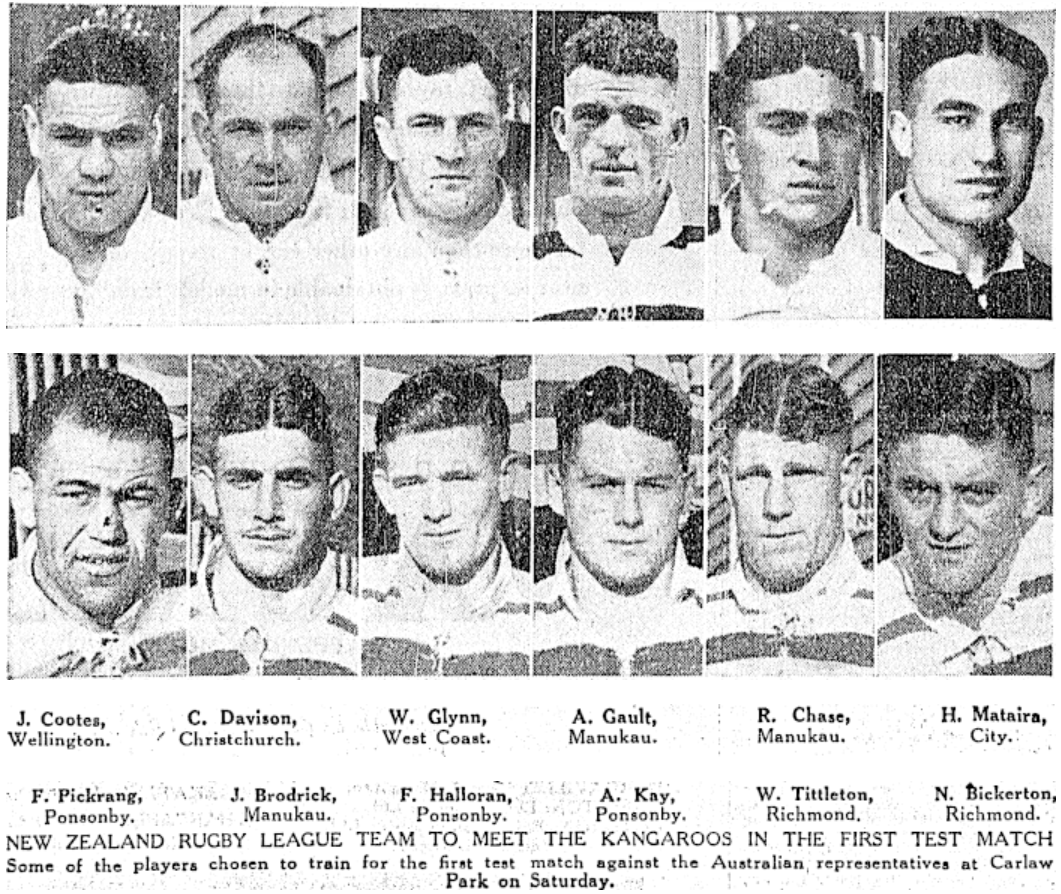
NZ team player profile pictures in 1937

Halloran was then chosen in the New Zealand test squad to play Australia. The squad was made up of 15 players, with 8 backs, but as Halloran was the only halfback named his place was virtually assured. The Star wrote "Halloran has been playing well this season, and his game behind the pack will be watched with interest". The Herald said that "little fault can be found with" his selection. After the side was named they were to report to the Auckland Gymnasium on the same evening (2 August). He was then chosen at halfback for the match day side with Noel Bickerton outside him at first five eighth. He would be opposed by Percy Williams, the Australian halfback.

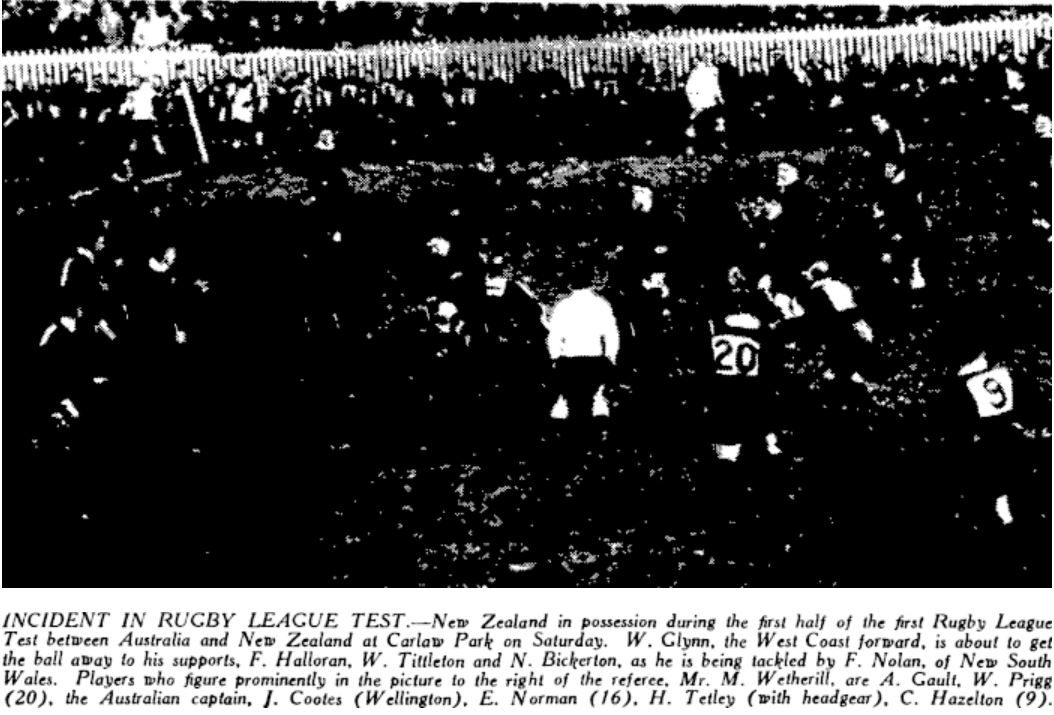
Halloran to the left along with Wally Tittleton and Noel Bickerton

The first test was played at Carlaw Park on 7 August before a crowd of 20,000 and saw Australia win a close match 12–8. Halloran was involved in the opening try of the match to New Zealand after a passing bout involving Rangi Chase and Wally Tittleton initially before "finally Halloran received and when well held he in-passed crisply to Bickerton and the nippy five-eighths dived over for a good try". At one stage he "raced through the defence, and he had Tittleton, Chase, and Davison in good positions. However, the ball travelled too slowly, and the Australians' cover defence checked a dangerous movement". The Herald noted that "early in the game Halloran received a nasty knock, and the best was not seen of his play at halfback". When the second test squad was named on 10 August he was not included in it and instead Peter Mahima was named at halfback. This was probably connected to an injury received during the game. When the test thirteen was finalised 2 days later on 12 August he was selected at halfback. The Herald wrote that "Mahima must be considered unlucky not to get the halfback position, as he played a brilliant game yesterday and has stronger claims for selection than Halloran". The match referred to was the 16–5 win by New Zealand Māori over Australia. The second test saw Halloran again playing inside Noel Bickerton and opposite Percy Williams. New Zealand caused an upset by winning the match 16-15 though they were helped by Australia suffering several serious injuries and playing much of the second half two men short. Halloran was again involved in a New Zealand try when early in the match he gathered the ball in an attacking position and "cut in" before he "whipped the ball out to Tittleton, to Davison, who scored at the corner". In a summary of the match it was said that he "tackled well and sent out good passes, but the transfers of all the backs lacked the snap and precision which characterised the work of the Australians". Most of the praise in the New Zealand side was reserved for fullback George Nēpia's play.

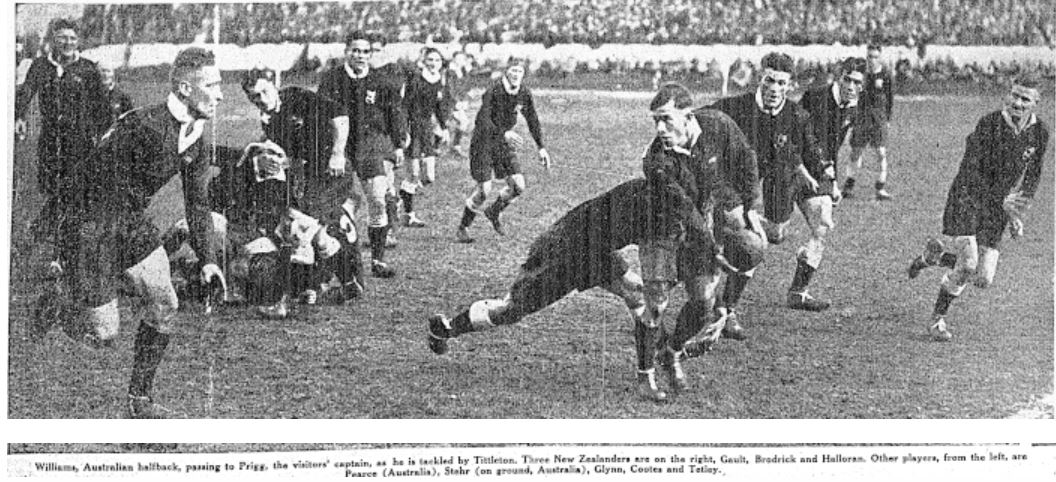

The Herald also wrote that "Halloran, behind the scrum, did his work in an effective manner".

==== Return to club football ====
Following the second and final test Halloran returned to his Ponsonby side to conclude the season. On 21 August they beat North Shore 23–9 in round 13 of the championship. He scored one of their five tries and also "did good work on defence". They lost their final round match to finish 5th in the Fox Memorial championship though were only 6 points off first in a competitive season. They then defeated North Shore in the first round of the Roope Rooster knockout competition before a win over Mount Albert in the semi final. He "combined well" with Stockley and they both "proved sound in defence". They played Marist in the final on 18 September but were defeated 25–10. Ponsonby put in one of their "poorest performances of the year" with the inside backs "standing flat-footed and passing the ball shoulder high". Halloran and Stockely said to have been "much below form. The five eighths had numerous chances in the second half, but there was no penetration and the pair passed wildly".

=== Transfer back to Northcote ===
The 1938 season was to be Halloran's last playing first grade rugby league and last at Ponsonby. He played 8 matches for them before transferring back to his Northcote club. On 30 April he received a trophy donated by Mr. A. Barnett for the best sportsman in the Ponsonby club. It was reported in early April that he would be available to play once more. His first match of the year was in their preliminary game against Manukau on 2 April. Halloran was back playing in the fullback position where he had spent time off and on in previous seasons. It was said that he was "sound" in the position. In their round 2 loss to Richmond (18-13) he started at fullback but moved to halfback in the second half when Black went off injured with a broken knee-cap. He was involved in their try on full-time when he was "associated" with Cootes and Edgar Morgan in a "nice movement" before the later scored. After he moved to halfback he was said to have done "some clever work on attack". The Auckland Star noted that he had been "more effective at halfback than fullback". In a 24–16 loss to City on 23 April Halloran also went off injured during the game. Ponsonby had four injured players with Black still in hospital, Arthur Kay out injured and both Halloran and P. Young injured in the City match. He appears to have missed their next match with Papakura on 30 April before returning for their 10–9 win over Newton. Halloran played at his more familiar position of halfback however he "was caught in possession of the ball too often, and selfishness on his part also spoiled many promising attacks". They then beat North Shore 16–7 at the Devonport Domain in round 7 with Halloran showing speed in some back work which saw Brian Riley scoring. The Herald said that he "played his best game this season, and got through a lot of useful work, particularly in the second half". Against Marist a week later Halloran achieved the rare feat of a conversion and a penalty as he had almost never taken goal kicks, though Ponsonby lost 13–7 in the main match at Carlaw Park. It was said that he was not as "prominent as usual". It was to be the last game he played for the Ponsonby senior side. The following week following an upset win over Manukau the Herald wrote that the "loss of Stockley and Halloran was compensated by the good play of Carr... and Rush" two promoted juniors. He was not mentioned in connection to any of their following 4 matches and then on 19 July it was reported that he and John Stockley (brother of Walter) had transferred to Northcote where they would join their senior B side. The Northcote side was playing in the Stallard Cup with 8 games remaining in their season though it is unknown if he played for them in any of those games. It is unclear if he retired however he enlisted in the World War 2 effort a few years later. Following the war it was stated in the book "Those Who Played" by Bruce Montgomery that he returned to the Ponsonby side and played for their reserve grade team.

== World War 2 ==
Halloran enlisted in the World War 2 effort in 1943. His war records show that he was living at 7 Tizard Road in Birkenhead, Auckland at the time with his next of kin, "Mrs. S.M. Halloran". His occupation was listed as a "warehouseman/civilian". While serving Halloran was a private in the infantry brigade in the Second New Zealand Expeditionary Force and was stationed in the Pacific Islands. Following his return he was awarded the War Medal 1939-1945 and the New Zealand War Service Medal.

== Personal life ==
Frank Halloran was Roman Catholic. He married Sabina Madge (Sybil) Hartigan (1916-1998) on 14 October 1939. They had two children, one of whom was a son named Anthony (Tony) who played rugby for St Peters in Auckland. According to electoral records in 1946 he and Sabina were living at 13 Vincent Street in Auckland city. By 1963 they were now living on Manapau Street in Remuera with his occupation listed as a warehouseman, while their son Tony was working as a pharmacist.

Halloran died on 2 August 1980, aged 67.
