= Noel Bickerton =

NZ international rugby league player

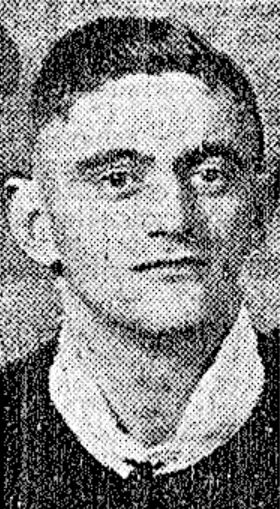

Personal information
- Full name: Noel Bickerton
- Born: 14 April 1914 Auckland, New Zealand
- Died: 2 October 1987 (aged 73) Auckland, New Zealand

Playing information
- Height: 175 cm (5 ft 9 in)
- Weight: 66 kg (10 st 6 lb)
- Position: Stand-off, Centre
Club
Years	Team	Pld	T	G	FG	P
1935–1939	Richmond Rovers	82	21	1	0	65
Representative
Years	Team	Pld	T	G	FG	P
1935–1938	Auckland Māori	6	2	0	0	6
1936–38	New Zealand Trial	3	0	0	0	0
1937	New Zealand	2	2	0	0	6
1937	New Zealand Māori	1	0	0	0	0
- Source: Papers Past As of September 2023

Noel Bickerton was a rugby league player who represented New Zealand in 1937 in two test matches against the touring Australian side scoring a try in each match. He thus became the 249th player to represent New Zealand. Bickerton also played for Auckland Māori (1935–38) in its formative years, and New Zealand Māori in 1937. He was a Richmond Rovers junior player and graduated to their senior side in 1935 where he played 82 matches for them over the following 5 years predominantly in the first five eighth (standoff) position in some of the glory years of the side.

== Early life ==
Noel Bickerton was born on 24 April 1914. His father was Charles Frederick Balfour Bickerton, and his mother was Valentine Gertie Bickerton (née. Simpkon). Charles mother was Isabella Whittaker, the daughter of Irihapeti Hineraria Te Wherowhero, who herself was apparently the daughter of Pōtatau Te Wherowhero the first Māori King, making Noel his great-great-grandson. He had two older brothers, James Balfour Bickerton and Joseph Whittaker Bickerton. Noel's mother Valentine remarried after Charles died in 1918, 2 years after returning from the war when Noel was aged 4. His father had been invalided home after being wounded at the Dardanelles in 1915. He was wounded in the right thigh and suffered concussion. His wounds healed but he complained of a continuous headache. Her new husband was Walter South Bickerton, Charles' older brother. Noel also had a cousin, Eric who was a good footballer playing for the Eden rugby club in the 1930s. Noel's uncles Harold and Lewis also played rugby for the a military representative side (No. 9 Co. G.A.V) in 1905.

== Playing career ==
=== Richmond juniors ===
The first mention of Noel's involvement with sport in the newspapers was in late October 1928 when he fought in a boxing match in the Fly-Weight Class of the Cadet Division. The tournament was held at the Drill Hall on Rutland Street. He would have been aged 14 at the time. Noel was representing his school which was Technical College. The schools full name was Seddon Memorial Technical College and they were based in the Auckland CBD on the site of present-day Auckland University of Technology. They were later relocated to Western Springs and renamed Western Springs College. He lost his fight to J.S. Brownlee of the 43rd Company in the second round on a technical knockout.

Bickerton was first mentioned for rugby league feats in 1930 when he was awarded a medal for his performance in the Richmond 6th grade B team for the 1929 season. They won the competition with an unbeaten season, winning 16 championship games and both knockout games. In 1930 he had advanced to Richmond's Fifth grade side. By 1931 he had progressed to the 4th Grade team, where he remained in 1932. By this time he was aged 18. In a match in 1932 against Papakura at Prince Edward Park in Papakura he scored a try after going through from a scrum near the Papakura line.

In 1933 in September it was reported that he was being reinstated to the rugby league code, indicating that he must have been playing rugby union during the season. He was then named in their Senior B team which was technically their reserve grade side. They were playing in their last match of the season against Newton Rangers and lost 5–0. The 1934 season saw him again in the Richmond reserve grade side. He was said to have had a very good season in the five eighth position. They won the championship and also won the Stallard Cup knockout competition. The Auckland Star wrote after their knockout final win over City Rovers that "the bright spot of the winning combination was the fine displays of Bickerton and Bennett, who were a constant source of danger to City, their handling also being particularly sound".

=== Richmond senior debut (1935) ===
In April 1935, the New Zealand Herald reported that Richmond would field the same senior side with one or two exceptions. One of these was "a reserve grade five eighths, N. Bickerton, [who] showed splendid form last year and may be given a chance to speed up the attack".

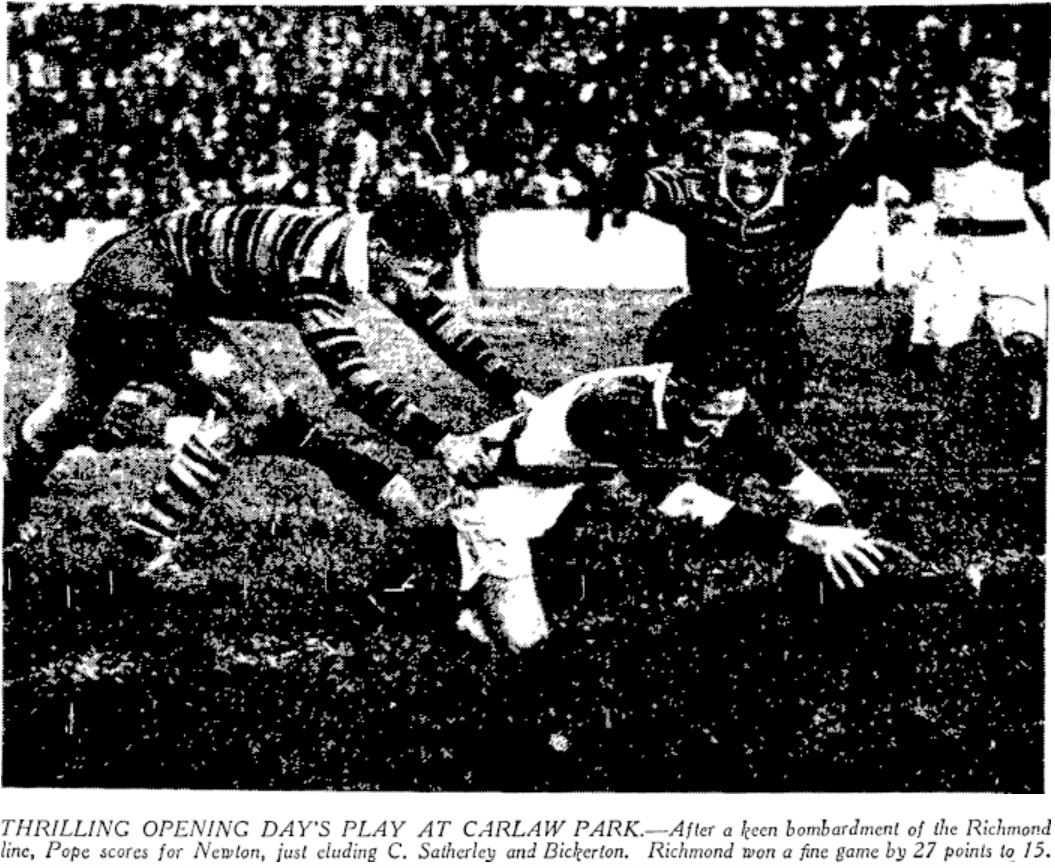

He made his debut in their opening round win against Newton Rangers at Carlaw Park on 27 April. He was in the five eighth (standoff) position with Richmond winning 27-15 and a photograph of him attempting to prevent a try was published in the New Zealand Herald. During the match Bert Cooke, who had switched codes two years earlier, observed "that Bickerton required better support… and moved up to second five eighth from the rear line. This had an electrical effect, for the famous All Black, revealing all his craft in running, handling, and kicking to gaps soon had his fast outsides going at concert pitch, and Newton had to bow to the inevitable towards the end of a delightfully sustained exhibition of brilliant play". The Auckland Star wrote that "there is no doubt about the quality of Bickerton, the young Richmond five-eighth, who is calculating and skilled". After the move of Cooke he made a "brilliant opening the first time he handled the ball, and showed a fine burst of speed to give Bickerton a try". It was said that in the first half Bickerton ran across field too much "however, [he] played better in the second half, and with experience should further improve". The following week in a win over Mount Albert United, former New Zealand halfback, Roy Powell did not play well with poor service from the scrums to Bickerton, however Bickerton, Cooke, and Ted Mincham “were on their toes, with the result that Alf Mitchell and McNeil sparkled”. In a 22–5 win over Ponsonby, Bickerton “proved an effective link in the chain” but made some “faulty” passes at times. The Herald wrote that Bickerton had taken Stan Prentice's place at first five-eighth, though Prentice was later to rejoin the side. They mentioned that he had a tendency to pass badly at times “but he should be able to rectify this easily”. In a 10–8 loss to Marist on 25 May the Herald said that he was "too slow moving which gave the defence time to smother attacks". His form turned around a week later when they beat City 12–6, with Bickerton being the "pivot of the attack at five-eighths" and he was "a promising player". Then in a 15–5 win over Newton he was “easily the best back on the ground, he made several splendid openings, and repeatedly turned defence into attack by clever running”. The Auckland Star wrote that “a great deal of credit for Richmond's success must go to Bickerton and Eric Fletcher, the former making many neat openings and handling the ball with certainty”. In comments of the game later in the week the Herald said that “the outstanding game played by N. Bickerton, … was a feature of the match. When the game was going against Richmond, Bickerton showed rare initiative and clever thrust. Twice he made fine runs and showed a lot of speed off the mark. Bickerton is the type of five eighths the code badly needs”. In rainy conditions against Mount Albert on 22 June “Bickerton and Fletcher combined creditably, but on the day were outmanoeuvred by their opposites, Morrissey and Dunn”. However Bickerton did “show out in some very good attacking movements”. In an easy 28–0 win over North Shore, Bickerton was forced to leave the field early due to a head injury. He was replaced by Harold Tetley. He had recovered enough to play a week later in their round 11 match against Ponsonby United though they could only draw, 11-11 and he “overdid the cross-kick, in spite of the fact that a try was scored from it”. He was one of the two best backs along with Powell, and an interception that he took led to one of their tries.

Richmond easily accounted for Marist on 13 July by 22 points to 0. The Auckland Star wrote that “the star of the winners was the elusive Bickerton, some of whose slicing of the defence was reminiscent of the remembered Karl Ifwersen at his best. His electric positioning sense, balance and timing of passes was a joy”. The Herald said he was “fulfilling his early season promise, and he did clever work on attack and defence”.

Richmond then had their bye round and the side travelled to Wellington to play the local representative side at the Winter Show Stadium. They won the match 32 points to 4 before a crowd of 3,000. After returning to Auckland they played their final championship round robin match and defeated City 19 points to 6. Bickerton was “prominent at five eighths and cut in nicely on occasions”.

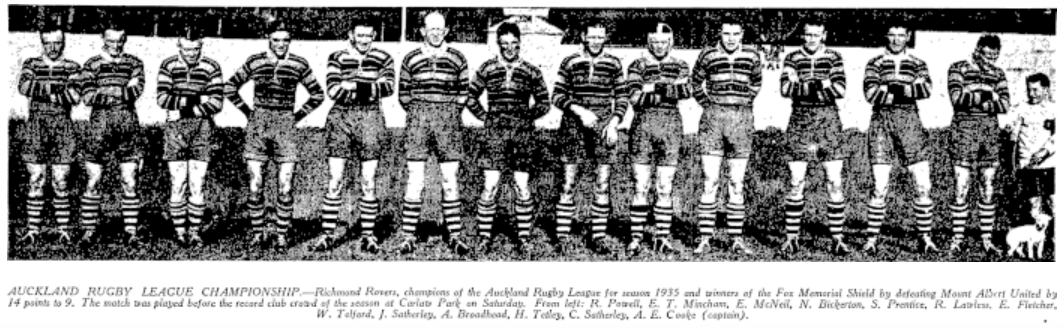
The champion winning side at Carlaw Park. Bickerton is 4th from the left.

The win meant that Richmond and Mt Albert were tied for first place and a final playoff was needed to determine the 1935 Fox Memorial champion. The Herald speculated during the week that the selectors might have given Bickerton a trial. Richmond won 15–9 to claim their second first grade title but Bickerton “was not at his best, and his inability to keep a close eye on Dunne resulted in him finding his way out to the wing in the second spell”. The Herald said that “it was surprising to see N. Bickerton played at centre and on the wing for Richmond. Bickerton should develop into a good attacking back if played as second five-eighths to Prentice, whose experience would be useful to the colt”. A writer to the same newspaper however disagreed with the Herald's reporting and stated that "Bickerton's original place was centre three quarter, opposite Claude List, and that his shift to the wing was due to a knock which temporarily disabled him".

On 24 August Richmond beat Devonport 23–15 in the first round of the Roope Rooster knockout competition. He and Fletcher lacked understanding in the first half though he did score a try after side stepping several defenders and the Herald wrote that he was easily their best back and as well as scoring a try he set up two others.

==== Auckland Māori (Tāmaki) selection ====
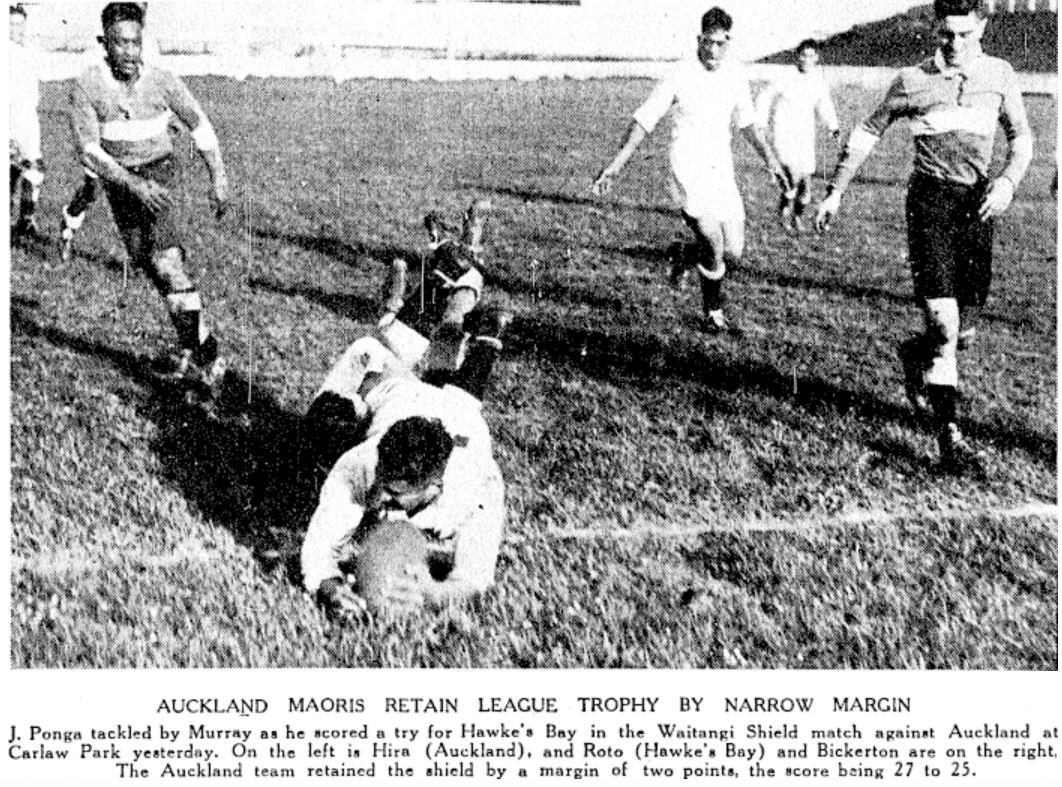
Bickerton playing for Auckland Māori (Tāmaki) on the right as J. Ponga scores for Hawke's Bay Māori.

Bickerton was then selected for the Auckland Māori (Tāmaki) squad to prepare to play Hawkes Bay Māori for the Waitangi Shield at Carlaw Park on Wednesday 28 August. The Auckland Māori side won 27-25 though Bickerton at five eighths was said to have been a “weak link” in the side. He returned to his Richmond side 3 days later in their 20-6 Roope Rooster semi final win over Mt Albert. He played well along with Roy Powell and Stan Prentice, and was also prominent on attack with Fletcher. In the Roope Rooster final against a much improving Newton side, Richmond was upset 10 points to 8 with Bickerton “below form” at five-eighths. This was to be his final game of the season. He was unavailable to play for Auckland Māori against Waikato Māori on 11 September owing to an injury, and he also missed Richmond's Stormont Shield win over Newton on 14 September.

=== 1936 Richmond, Auckland Māori, and NZ Trial ===
The 1936 season saw Bickerton play 19 matches for Richmond, scoring 7 tries. He was also selected once more for Auckland Maori, playing two matches, while he was also chosen to play in a New Zealand trial match.

His first game of the season was in a pre-season match against Mt Albert. George Tittleton and Wally Tittleton had move north from the South Auckland (Waikato) competition. Wally played at five eighth, with Bickerton playing well in the three quarters along with Ted Mincham with the paid said to have “made the most of their opportunities”. For their opening round Fox Memorial match against Ponsonby at Carlaw Park on 2 May Bickerton played on the wing and scored a try in their 21–10 win. He scored again in round 3 with a weakened Richmond side taking the field with Cliff Satherley and Ted Mincham both out injured and Eric Fletcher leaving field injured. Richmond lost 13–12 with Bickerton said to be “prominent in some nice passing movements”. A week later in a 23–12 win over Marist he scored twice playing in the centre position. The first described as “good handling and straight running gave Bickerton a clever try”, described later as a “gem”. The Herald said he was “easily the best back and made several nice openings which resulted in tries”. Bickerton scored two more tries in a 19–14 win over Newton on 30 May. It was written that “Bickerton and Mincham an enterprising pair, the former again shining for tricky runs which harasses the opposition”. The Herald said that he “played a good game and is a very promising player”. In a 13–13 draw with Devonport he along with Mincham and Wally Tittleton played “heady” games. He was then selected in a 19-man Auckland Māori squad to play Auckland Pākehā on 23 June. Prior to the naming of the side to play he played for Richmond in their 18–12 loss to City and was said to have not handled “as well as usual, and his defence was weak”. Ernie Asher then selected Bickerton in the Auckland Māori starting side in the centre position with Lou Brown captaining the side outside him on the wing. He was to play opposite his Richmond teammate Wally Tittleton. Prior to the game which was to be played on Tuesday 23 June, Bickerton played for Richmond in round 8 of the championship in a 15–6 win over Ponsonby. He made a break which led to a try to halfback Roy Powell. He made other “splendid openings” in the match. Around this time a pair of Bickerton's began to play for the Mount Albert senior and reserve grade sides but it is unknown if they were related to Noel.

In the Auckland Māori match they defeated Auckland Pākehā by 30 points to 21. Bickerton was only mentioned as being “likely to score” after a Māori forward rush but was unable to. He returned to the Richmond side the following weekend with Richmond drawing 11–11 with Mount Albert. Wally Tittleton and Bickerton “were a pair of lively five eighths who were always studying their supports”. The Herald said that “Bickerton, first five eighths, was always in the picture, but he kicked too much and several of his kicks were not well placed”. It was reported on 8 July that Point Chevalier wanted to acquire L. Bickerton from Mount Albert. It is possible that this was Lewis Joseph Bickerton, who was aged 26 and was Noel's cousin. Meanwhile, Noel was selected in a New Zealand trial match between A and B teams as the curtain raiser to the interisland match at Carlaw Park. The team was selected by Bert Avery with Bickerton in the B Team on the wing, opposite S. Loader of the Marist side.

Bickerton then played for the Auckland Māori (Tamaki) side to defend the Waitangi Shield against Northland (Takahiwai) on 15 July. He played first five in the 39 to 15 win and scored a try. He was “frequently in the picture for smart runs” along with Jackie Rata. His try came after a “good passing bout”. Richmond then had a narrow 3–0 win over Marist with Bickerton said to have “made few mistakes”. Bickerton was selected in the Auckland Māori team to play Waikato Māori on 29 July but the match was later cancelled due to poor weather. In Richmond's round 13 match with Devonport, which they lost 5–3 in atrocious conditions at Carlaw Park on 22 August Bickerton played well. The Auckland Star said that Richmond's inside backs were “unable to function in spite of the brilliancy of Bickerton, whose tendency was to run too far with the ball and lose support that could hardly be expected on such a slippery ground surface”. In Richmond's final match of the championship they defeated City 10-2 and finished runner up to Manukau. He and Wally Tittleton “made the most of possessive action”.

They then began their knockout matches with a 24–10 win over Marist in Round 1 of the Roope Rooster. The Auckland Star said that he “continues to develop as a most elusive and effective five-eighth”. In their 10-8 round 2 loss to City he was Richmond's best back along with Mincham and played “ably at five eighths”. They were then defeated by Marist in the Phelan Shield competition 17 to 3 with Bickerton scoring their only try after Roy Powell had worked the blind side from a scrum. Bickerton's final match of the season came in the Stormont Shield final with Manukau. Richmond had qualified by finishing runner up in the championship after Manukau won it and also won the Roope Rooster competition. Richmond won 30 points to 9 on 3 October. Bickerton was involved constantly in their attacking play. Later that night the Richmond side held a dinner at the Commercial Hotel before moving to the Titirangi Kiosk for a dance. While there Bickerton and his wife were presented with a set of cutlery to mark their marriage which had occurred earlier in the year.

=== 1937 Richmond, Auckland Māori, and New Zealand selection ===
The 1937 season saw Bickerton play another 19 games for Richmond. He scored 8 tries. He once again represented Auckland Māori and also made his debut for New Zealand against Australia in two tests.

In mid-April it was reported that Bickerton would once again be available to play for Richmond in the five eighths. He opened the year playing in Richmond's preliminary round games on 17 April (v Manukau) and 24 April. He kicked a rare penalty in the later game which was won 17–10 over Ponsonby and “played good football”. In a round 1 win over Mount Albert he was mentioned as “except for a tendency to kick too much and run across the field, did some fine work”. His first try of the season came a week later in an upset 15–13 loss to North Shore. His try came by the posts after Ted Mincham started the movement from fullback and Wally Tittleton made a break and handled twice.

Bickerton was selected in an 18-man squad to play for Auckland Māori against Auckland Pākehā on 12 May. He was ultimately named at five eighth alongside Jackie Rata of the City side. Auckland Pākehā won the match 24–14 at Carlaw Park which was played on Coronation Day. Bickerton then scored a try in a 24–6 win over City where he “played well at five eighth” and he Wally Tittleton “used the short punt to advantage, and often had City defending”. Then on Carlaw Park #2 field Richmond thrashed Marist 55–15 with Bickerton scoring a double and “was always handy” with Mincham. He scored again for Richmond in their 15–6 defeat of Ponsonby in round 6 and was “possibly the pick of the Richmond backs” along with Wally Tittleton at five eighth and his brother George on the wing. His try came after he “left the Ponsonby backs standing with a perfect dummy and raced over by the posts”. On the following Monday he was named as the back reserve player for Auckland's match with Taranaki. He was not required to play and would ultimately finish his career never representing the full Auckland side. Bickerton continued his try scoring form, getting another one in a narrow 22-18 win over Manukau in the main match at Carlaw Park. He combined well with W. Tittleton and his try came after some clever reverse passing.

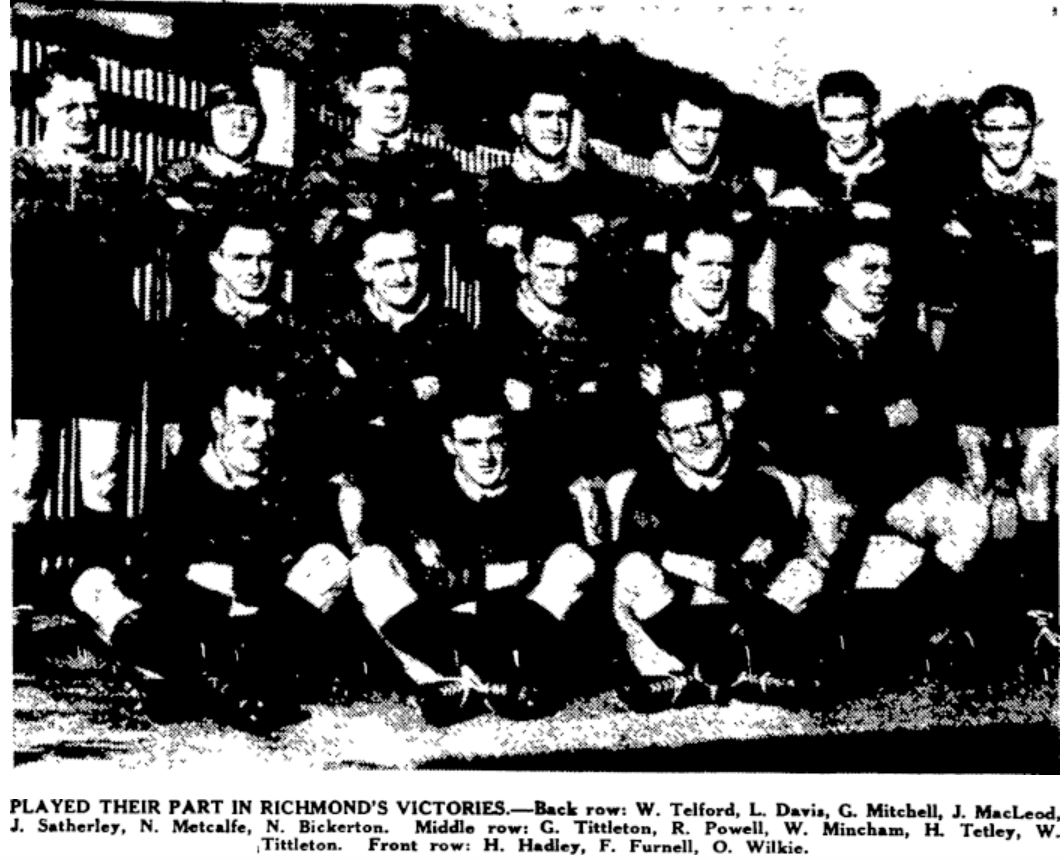
Richmond on 3 July 1937.

Another try followed in their 15-2 win over Mount Albert which firmed their place at the top of the championship after 8 rounds. In the first half “Richmond had the misfortune to lose the services of N. Bickerton, their clever and nippy five eighths, before the interval… Bickerton was in fine form up till the time of his retirement, and in addition to scoring his side's opening try, he was backing up with fine anticipation and lending additional thrust to the Richmond chain. On one occasion he chimed into a passing rush three times. He was ever ready for the in-pass from W. Tittleton and the alert Mincham”. His try occurred after he side stepped Basil Cranch, the Mount Albert fullback “beautifully”, and “although tackled from behind he was able to touch down by the posts”. In an 11–9 win over North Shore Bickerton scored another try and set one up with a break and kick. The Herald wrote that he was “easily the best of the backs and played a heady game”. Richmond were missing Wally Tittleton outside Bickerton and Dick Smith and Zane-Zaninovich played well for North Shore, keeping Bickerton in check. In a narrow round 10 loss to Ponsonby he “played another sound game, and his fine backing up gave good service from the base of the scrum” and was “conspicuous for good play in the second spell”.

Bickerton's next match was for Auckland Māori (Tāmaki) against Waikato Māori on 21 July. He played at first five eighth with Jack Tawhai outside him. He “played well” in a 28–6 win with Jack Hemi scoring 5 tries and kicking 3 goals from fullback. Returning to Richmond for their next match against City (won 10–6) he “did a lot of good work on attack, but his defence was very weak”.

==== New Zealand selection v Australia ====
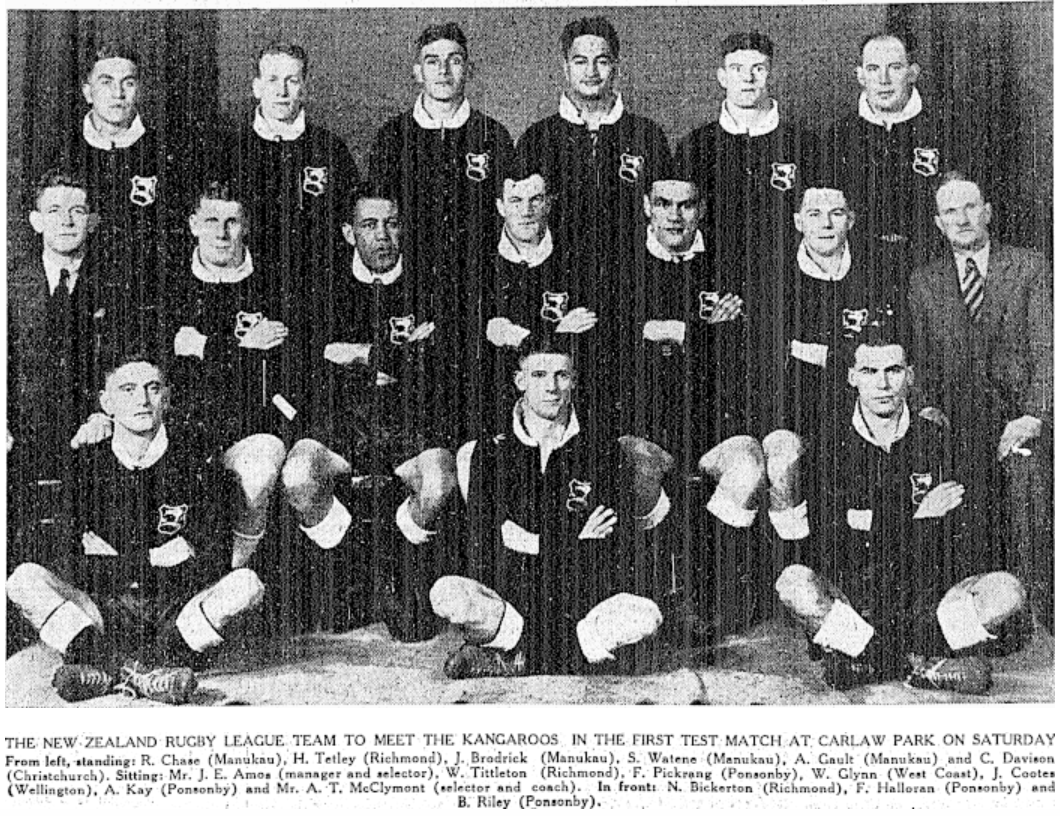

With the Australia tour of New Zealand approaching there were several representative matches being played to assist the selectors. Bickerton was chosen for a New Zealand Possibles side to play the Probables at Carlaw park on Wednesday 28 July. He was paired with his Richmond teammate Wally Tittleton in the five eighth positions and Frank Halloran (Ponsonby) at halfback. They were matched up with brothers Rangi Chase, and Tommy Chase in the halves and Peter Mahima at halfback, all from the Manukau side which had won the championship the year prior. The Possibles side won 25 to 11 with the Herald singling out Bickerton for high praise saying that “a feature of the game was the splendid play of Bickerton, at five eighths for the Possibles, and [Jackie] Rata on the wing. The former made some nice openings and was easily the best of the inside backs”... “T. Chase, did an amount of good work on defence, but he was over-shadowed by Bickerton”. Just 3 days later he played for Richmond and once more he and Tittleton were playing opposite Rangi and Tommy Chase who were playing for Manukau. It was said that the selectors would be watching the game closely. The match was drawn 11–11 with Bickerton and W. Tittleton said to be “going great guns” for Richmond along with Jack McLeod, Hermes Hadley, Harold Tetley, and Bill Telford. The Herald said that Bickerton played a “sterling game”.

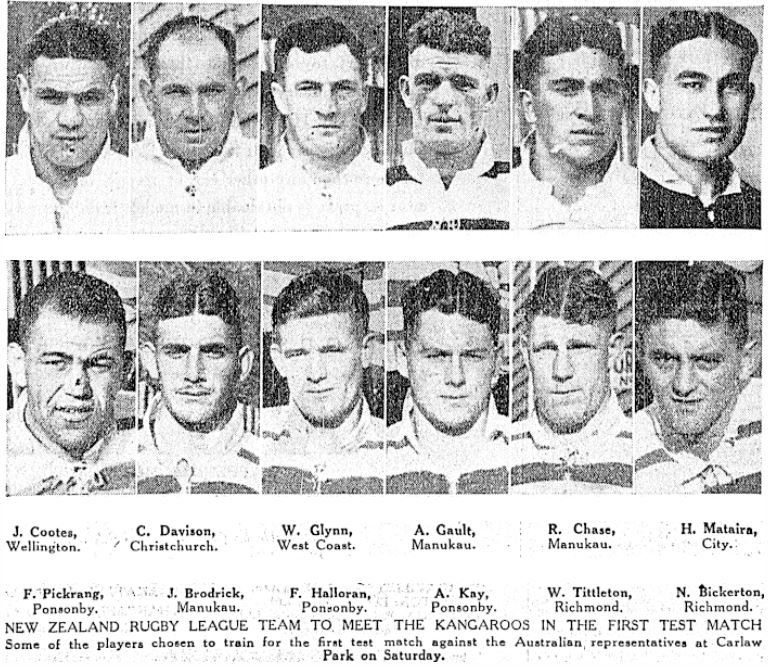

Bickerton was then chosen in the New Zealand team to play Australia on 7 August. The selectors were Bert Avery, Thomas McClymont, and Jim Amos. He would once again be playing first five eighth and paired with Wally Tittleton, with Halloran at halfback.

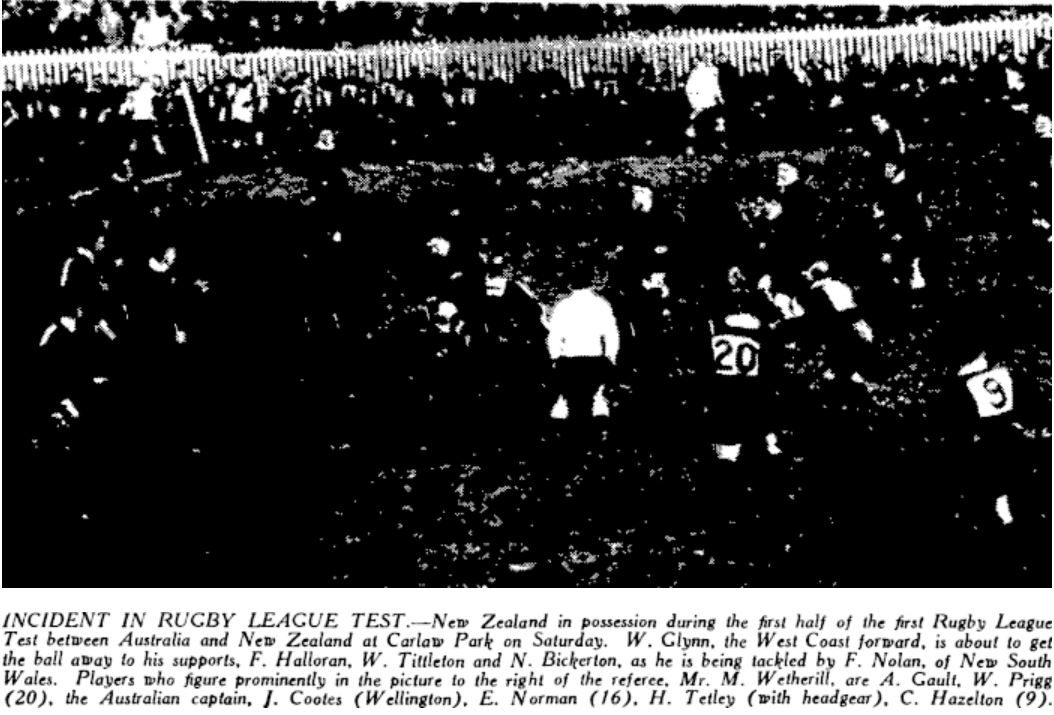
Bickerton 3rd from the left in the midground in support of Billy Glynn.

He and Tittleton, it was said, “should combine effectively” in the five eighth line. Bickerton was opposite Australian five eighth Ernie Norman. The Herald suggested that the NZ pair would be “set a difficult task to check this pair” in reference to Norman and Percy Williams. The match, played at Carlaw Park attracted great interest and a crowd of around 19,000 attended. They witnessed New Zealand losing a tightly fought match by 12 points to 8 after the scores had been level at 6–6 at half time. Bickerton scored the opening try of the match after Ces Davison secured the ball for New Zealand before transferring it “to Tittleton, Bickerton and Rangi Chase, and then Bickerton came in again to record the first try after 11 minutes’ play. It was a bright movement by the New Zealand backs”. Later in the first half Williams beat Bickerton completely and it was only Harold Tetley intercepting a pass that save the situation. After a New Zealand penalty put them in the lead 8-6 Australia responded with two tries to claim the win in heavy ground conditions. In comments on the match the Herald said that “Bickerton was prominent on attack and made several nice openings. His general play justified his inclusion”.

He was then named as part of the 17 man New Zealand Māori squad to play the tourists midweek. Ultimately though Tommy Chase was chosen at five eighth with his brother Rangi in the inside centre position. The Māori side caused a huge upset with a 16–5 win. Bickerton was also named in a squad to train at the ‘Auckland Gymnasium’ each evening leading up to the second test. On the Thursday, prior to the second test Bickerton and his wife attended a ball with the Australian team as guests at the Peter Pan Cabaret which had been organised by the Auckland Rugby League ladies committee.

Bickerton was once again selected at first five eighth for the second test which was also to be played at Carlaw park, on 14 August. There were changes in the backline with Arthur Kay coming into the centre position and George Nēpia making his debut at fullback. Bickerton would once again be playing opposite Ernie Norman. New Zealand caused another upset, winning 16 to 15 with Bickerton scoring the winning try. New Zealand had trailed 6–15 at halftime but benefitted greatly from injuries to the Australians which saw them play much of the second half a man or two down. Joe Pearce broke his leg trying to tackle Nēpia, while Jim Gibbs broke two ribs in a ruck. His try came when the “New Zealand backs and forwards combined in a passing bout that harassed the visitors. Finally Bickerton chimed into the movement for a second time to take a pass from Kay and dived over at the corner”. Bickerton has been involved in New Zealand's second try which gave them a 6–5 lead after passing to Jack Brodrick who ran 40 metres before Billy Glynn, Harold Tetley, and Ces Davison completed the movement. The Herald wrote that Bickerton “was overshadowed by the versatile Norman at five eighths, and was several times left standing. However, he was always handy in attacking movements”. The Herald in another article mentioned that it was weak tackling by Kay and Bickerton that let Wally Prigg through before he sent Doug McLean in for the try. They also suggested that he should have grubber kicked more but that he “showed up well at five eighths, and these matches should considerably improve his knowledge of positional play”.

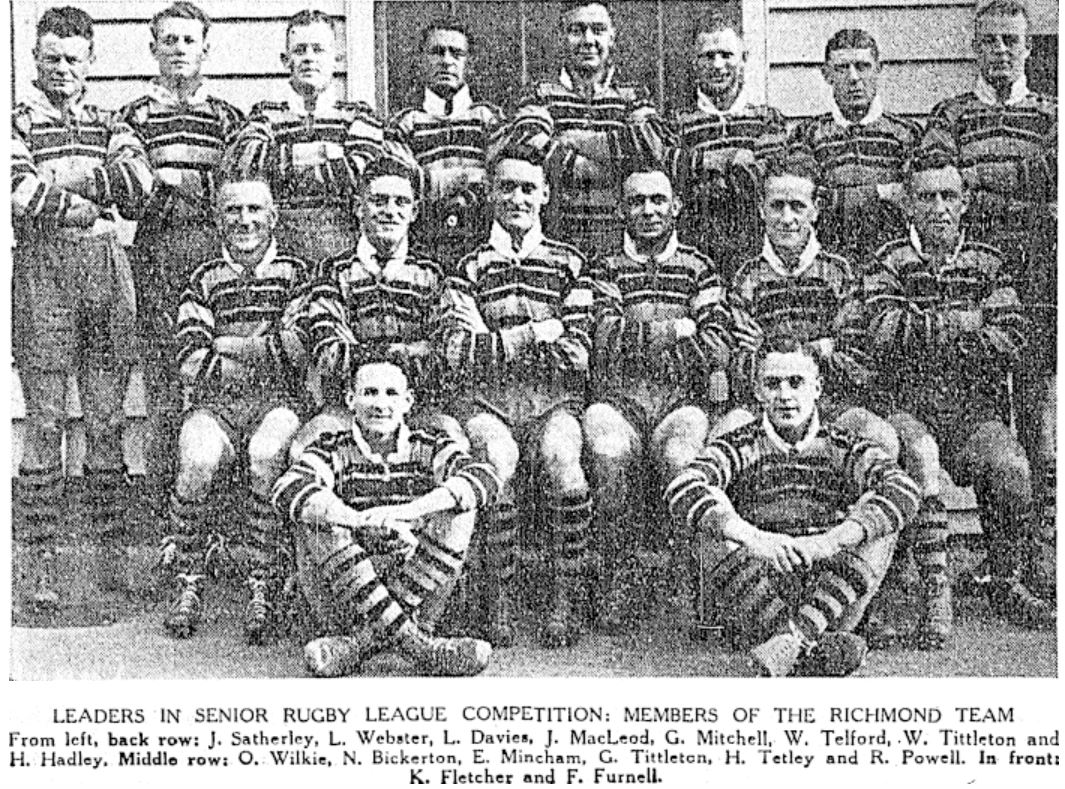

Following the test series Bickerton returned to his Richmond side with the championship drawing to a conclusion. He played in their round 13 loss to Marist by 30 points to 24. He reportedly “was well marked, but occasionally flashed through the defence in penetrating runs”. Richmond remained at the top of the table moving in to the final round however and needed a win to claim the Fox Memorial Shield. They comfortably beat Newton in the last round to win the title. Bickerton “teamed well” with Greenwood and Wally Tittleton, with “Bickerton once more showing just what a fine club man he is and his backing up was a shining example to all other backs in the code. His nip and pace added thrust to many a Richmond movement. It was noticeable on once occasion that after sending the ball along he was there to take two other passes in one passing bout – truly a will-o'-the wisp effort”. They later reported how he was involved in several attacking movements that led to tries and “was easily the best back and is a much improved player. He made numerous openings and was always in the attack”. In an upset loss to City in round 1 of the Roope Rooster “Bickerton shone once more for fine penetration and backing up. One of the most improved players in the code he was perhaps the best back on the ground”. The Herald wrote that he was Richmond's “outstanding back and was often a thorn in the side of the opposition”. Then in a Phelan Shield loss to North Shore he was amongst the pick of the Richmond backs with Own Wilkie and Frank Furnell. Richmond's final match of the season was in the Stormont Shield final against Marist. Richmond lost 12–5 on 2 October. Bickerton, Roy Powell, and Ted Mincham were “the pick of the backs, with snappy, penetrating runs and safe handling”.

His final game of the season came for New Zealand Māori against Auckland. The side was chosen by Māori rugby league legend Ernie Asher. The match was played on 9 October and was the final game of the rugby league season. The Māori side won 43–21 with “Bickerton and [Tommy] Chase prominent on occasions”. He had played at five eighth with Peter Mahima outside him. At one stage in the second half he “made a clever run and passed to Brimble. The ball went from Raymond to Jack Tristram who scored”.

=== 1938 Richmond and Auckland Māori ===
The 1938 season was to be the last full season of Bickerton's career. He played 23 games for Richmond which was the most in a season by him for his club side, and 1 match for Auckland Māori along with 1 New Zealand trial game. However he was ultimately not selected for the New Zealand tour of Australia with Wally Tittleton, Walter Brimble, and Rangi Chase preferred in the five eighth positions. Prior to the start of the season the Richmond club held their annual meeting and congratulated Bickerton and teammates Wally Tittleton, Jack Satherley, and Jack McLeod on their New Zealand selection.

His first game of the season was a preseason match with Mount Albert where he played well before an opening round win over Papakura. He “played splendidly” and showed “perfect combination” between him and Tittleton. Then in an 18–13 win over Ponsonby on 16 April he made a good opening but also made some handling mistakes. He was “outstanding in the second half” in a 1-point loss to Newton a week later. His first try of the year came in a 1-point win over North Shore in the following round however due to an officiating error where the referee allowed a conversion to be taken from the wrong spot meant the league required the match to be replayed at a later date. His try came when he kicked the ball through and dived on it, and overall he combined well with Watkins. The next round saw Richmond beat Marist with Bickerton making “a beautiful opening from which [Alf] Broadhead scored” and he and Tittleton “showed [their] football ability on attack”. The week after however he was criticised for being caught in possession too often in an 18–16 loss to Manukau.

Bickerton was selected in the New Zealand trial to be played at Carlaw Park on 28 May in the Possibles side. The match was a curtain raiser to the North Island – South Island interisland match. Bickerton had moved down the pecking order with Wally Tittleton and Walter Brimble chosen in the five eighth positions for the North Island side. Bickerton was at first five eighth with Jack Hemi outside him, while they were matched up against Tommy Chase and Ted Brimble. The Possibles team won 25-21 though Bickerton was not mentioned in the brief match reports and he was not subsequently named in the New Zealand side to tour Australia.

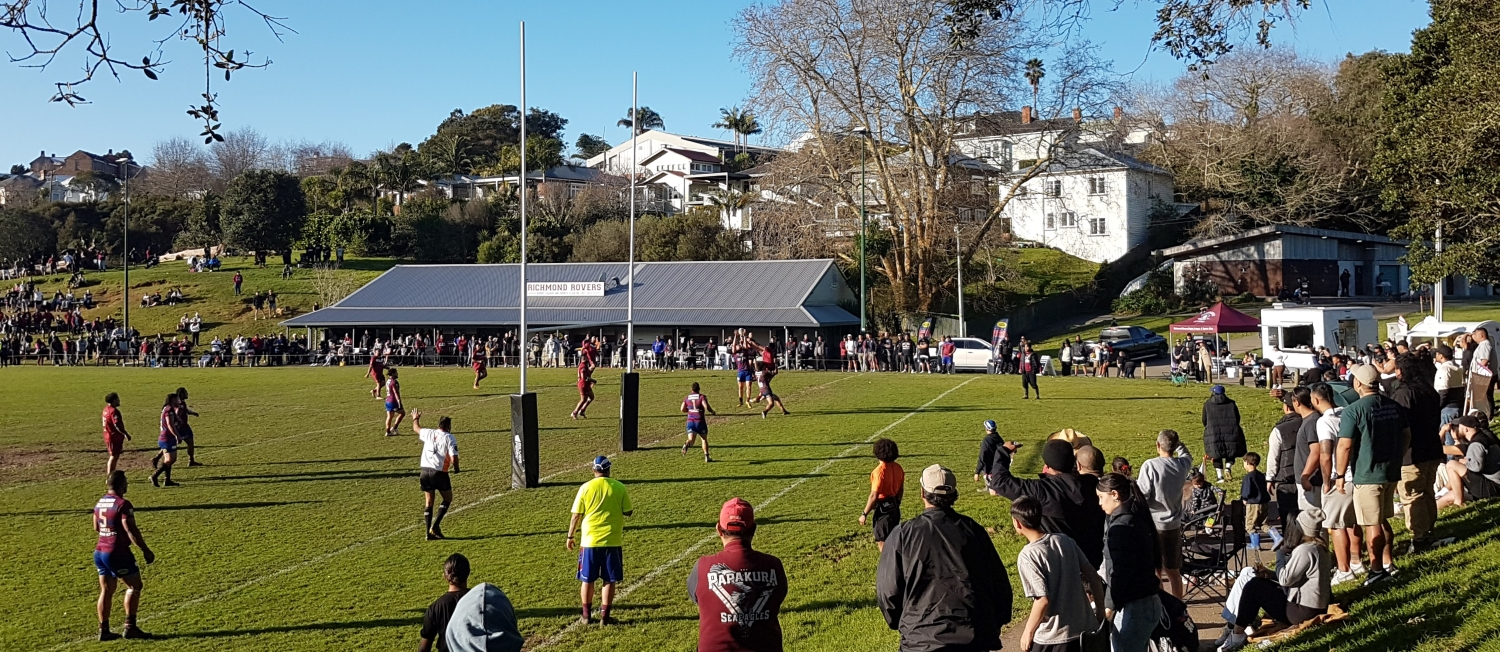
The present day Richmond clubrooms in the same location as the original clubrooms from 1938

Returning to the Richmond side the following weekend he scored a try in a 29–7 win over Mount Albert. It was reported that he “showed much improvement on his form in the New Zealand trial match and once beat the defence badly with a clever change of direction”. Then on 4 June Bickerton played in a special match at Grey Lynn Park against Huntly with the match marking the occasion of the opening of the Richmond clubrooms at their home ground. Richmond lost the game At the same time against a strong opponent 23–11. At the same time Bickerton was named in the Auckland Māori side to play against Auckland [Auckland Pākehā]. He was paired with Ted Brimble who curiously was not Māori at all, with an English father and a Buntu mother from South Africa. Bickerton scored a try in a 26 to 21 victory after taking a long pass over the head of their opponents from Tommy Chase to score under the posts. Despite his try the Herald said that he was “uncertain and disappointing”.

He was not mentioned in Richmond's next 3 matches before being said to be “well watched” in a 16–2 loss to Newton. The following week in an 18–5 win over North Shore Bickerton “was prominent in the second half, but he [was] not showing the form of last season”. The week after in a loss against Mount Albert he was again “prominent in the second half”. Following a 6–6 draw with Manukau where he was “sound at five eighths” along with Kenneth Fletcher he was selected as a reserve for the Auckland team to play Canterbury on 13 August. He was not required to play however. Curiously there was a full round of club matches played on the same day except for Richmond and Manukau and the Auckland team was made up entirely from the players of those two clubs. Auckland still won 28–22.

Richmond had finished the championship in 5th position and now moved into the Roope Rooster knockout competition. In round 2 they beat Ponsonby 19-6 and “Bickerton was dangerous on attack and his quickness in changing direction often upset the Ponsonby backs”. In the semi final Richmond defeated North Shore 20–7 with Bickerton doing “good work”.

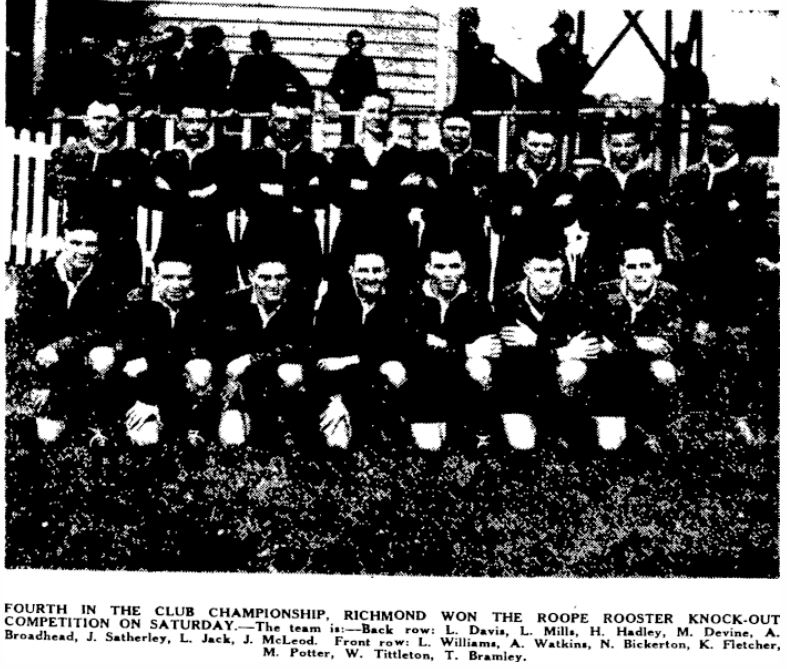

In the final, against City on 17 September he scored a try in their 20–8 win to secure the Roope Rooster trophy. He “showed good understanding” with Potter and was “beginning to reveal the form which has made him outstanding in past seasons”. The Auckland Star said he and Potter were “faultless”. The Herald later wrote that he “showed a return to his best form, after a season of indifferent football. He changed direction several times during the game and gave his forwards two tries”.

Then on 1 October he played in Richmond's match against the touring Eastern Suburbs side which has finished runner up in the New South Wales competition. Richmond won the match 11 points to 9. The Herald wrote that Bickerton “was not so prominent as usual, and was too slow in getting rid of the ball when Watkins had given him reasonable chances. Some of Bickerton's kicking, too, was not well directed”. In Richmond's final match of the season they beat Marist to win the Stormont Shield ‘champion of champions’ title with a 9–8 win on 8 October. He made a “nice opening” for Tittleton to score but was often caught in possession. Following the conclusion of the season Noel's step father, Walter died on 21 November aged 55.

=== Retirement in 1939 ===
The 1939 season was to be Bickerton's last. He only played in 4 matches for Richmond before no longer appearing. Three years later he enlisted in the war effort and served overseas. He didn't make his first appearance until round 4 with his name missing from the published team lists prior. He made his season debut I a 9–0 loss to Mount Albert on 29 April. In round 6 he scored his last ever try in a 15–5 win over Manukau with the Herald writing that “Panapa and Brimble were no match for Graham and Bickerton”. His final ever match came against Marist on 5 June. He failed to force the ball in his in goal and Matthews came through to score for Marist. It was the last mention of Bickerton on a football field.

On 24 July Bickerton was present at a farewell dance at the Peter Pan Cabaret for the Auckland members of the New Zealand team which was departing for their tour of England and France. Unfortunately the tour was cut short with just two matches played due to the outbreak of World War 2.

== World War 2 ==
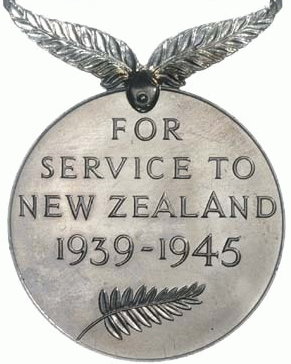
NZ War Service Medal

In 1942 Bickerton enlisted in World War 2. He became a gunner in the heavy Anti-Aircraft Regiment, N.Z. Artillery as part of the Second New Zealand Expeditionary Force. At the time of his enlistment he was living at 2 Coyle Street in Sandringham, Auckland with his occupation a “Departmental Manager/Civilian”. Following his return from the war he was awarded the War Medal 1939-1945 and the New Zealand War Service Medal.

== Personal life ==
On 26 October 1935 Noel married Doris Orrell. They had three children, including a son born on 22 January at Nurse Stewart's in Mount Eden, a daughter (Noelene Oborn), and another son in the 1940s.

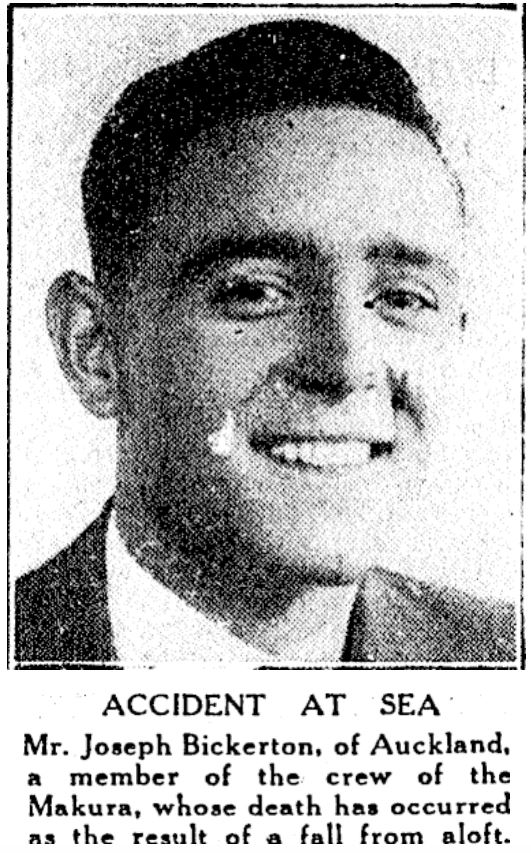
Noel's brother, killed in an accident at sea aged 23 in 1935.

On 7 March 1935 Noel's brother Joseph was killed in an accident at sea at the age of 23. He was on board the R.M.S.S. Makura where he worked. The accident happened while it was traveling from Papeete to San Francisco. He fell from a mast and was killed instantly.

He lived in Avondale for most of his retirement from rugby league. In 1954 the electoral roll stated that he was living at 24 Craddock Street in Avondale and was working as a supervisor. The electoral records showed that he continued to live at Craddock Street through the 1960s, 70s, and into the 1980s with his occupation listed as a men's outfitter in 1957, and 1960.

Following his retirement and return from the war Bickerton worked as a draper. He operated two stores named Bickerton and Cameron at 122 Parnell Road in Parnell, and 433 Manukau Road in Epsom in the early 1950s. In 1954 the pair dissolved their partnership of their “men's outfitters and general drapery” and Bickerton took over the Parnell store by himself. Later on he had operated a business named “Noel Bickerton Ltd.” But it was struck off the companies register in 1975.

Noel Bickerton died on 2 October 1987, aged 73. He was cremated with his ashes interred in Waikumete Cemetery.
