= Eric Fletcher (rugby) =

NZ international rugby league & union player

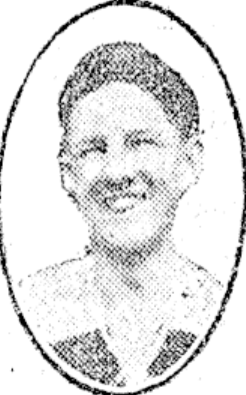

Personal information
- Full name: Eric Gordon Fletcher
- Born: 23 June 1910 Kyeburn, Otago, New Zealand
- Died: 15 April 1996 (aged 85) Palmerston North, New Zealand

Playing information
- Weight: 11 st 3 lb (157 lb; 71 kg)

Rugby union
- Position: Centre, Second five
Club
Years	Team	Pld	T	G	FG	P
1929–32	Old Boys (Palmerston North)	48	18	30	0	121
1932–33	Technical Old Boys (Auckland)	10	2	0	0	6
1932	Massey College (Palmerston North)	3	0	0	0	0
	Total	61	20	30	0	127
Representative
Years	Team	Pld	T	G	FG	P
1929–36	Manawatu	20	9	13	0	56
1929–31	Manawhenua	18	10	7	0	47
1929–32	Manawatu Trials	6	1	8	0	23
1932	Auckland B	1	0	0	0	0
1932	Auckland	1	0	0	0	0

Rugby league
- Position: Centre, Halfback
Club
Years	Team	Pld	T	G	FG	P
1934–36	Richmond Rovers	29	8	13	0	50
Representative
Years	Team	Pld	T	G	FG	P
1935	Auckland Trial	1	1	5	0	13
1935	Auckland	2	0	1	0	2
1935	New Zealand	1	0	0	0	0
1935	Auckland Province	1	1	6	0	15
- As of 29 November 2021

Eric Gordon Fletcher (23 June 1910 – 15 April 1996) was a rugby union and rugby league player. He represented the New Zealand rugby league team in 1 test against Australia in 1935. In the process he became the 239th player to represent New Zealand. Fletcher also played rugby union representatively for Manawatu province and the combined Manawatu-Horowhenua side whilst a member of the Old Boys and later Massey College club sides. After moving to Auckland he also represented Auckland in a sub-union match with Thames. After switching to rugby league he played for the Richmond Rovers club and played for Auckland, and Auckland Province. He was also a talented cricketer and played a handful of games for Manawatu in his younger years. After retiring from rugby he played representative golf in the Manawatu region and in 1939 played in the New Zealand Golf Open.

== Early family life ==
Eric Gordon Fletcher was born on 23 June 1910 to Sarah Isabel Fletcher (née Harkers) and James Fletcher in Kyeburn, central Otago in the South Island of New Zealand. He had an older brother named Lloyd James Fletcher who had been born a year earlier in 1909. Lloyd would later be killed in fighting in Tunisia during World War 2. His parents then had a son named Lawrence Neil Fletcher (b. 1912), Wilfred who was born in September 1913 but died days later, another son named Alan Logan Fletcher (b. 1914), and a fifth son named Keith Walter Fletcher (b. 1917). The family grew up in Palmerston North. Eric went to Campbell Street School and all the brothers attended Palmerston North Boys' High School where the feats of Alan, Keith, and Eric were well known. In fact on 17 November 1936 they donated a silver cup to the school to award for “senior club relay races”.

== Sporting career ==
=== Palmerston North Boys High School ===
Eric Fletcher became a prominent and celebrated athlete whilst at Palmerston North Boys' High School. In 1926 he was the junior swimming champion at the school. He began playing for the 1st XV in 1927 and in a June match scored 2 tries in a 28–16 win over Old Boys. He played centre for them and on 15 June played in front of 10,000 spectators at the Palmerston North Showgrounds as part of the Winter Show events. PNBHS beat Te Aute College 6–5. His efforts weren't finished there however as he also won the “milk testing” competition with 84 points. He went on to play over 10 matches for them during the season including a Moascar Cup match against Te Aute College though they lost 8–5 to the holders. Fletcher, reportedly weighing 10st 2 lb, scored his side's only try after chasing a kick following a break.

In September Fletcher was selected for the Manawatu junior rep side to play Bush juniors. Manawatu won easily 26–12 with Fletcher scoring a first half try where he “badly fooled the defence prior to cutting clean through to outpace the opposition and score behind the posts”. It was said that he and Weston at full-back were the outstanding backs on their side. The 2 sides played again a day later at Spriggens Park in Whanganui and Manawatu won again though by 6 points to 5 this time with Fletcher crossing for a try in the corner. He was then selected to play in the same side against the Wellington juniors. The match was a curtain-raiser to the Ranfurly Shield match between Manawhenua and Canterbury in Palmerston North and saw Wellington win 6–3.

On the evening of 16 December Palmerston North Boys High School held their annual prize giving along with the Girls School at the Opera House. Fletcher, who was in his second to last year of school won the Tucker Brothers Cup for winning the high jump championship (clearing 4 feet 10 inches), the Whalley Cup for winning the road race in a school record time of 12 minutes 55.35 seconds, and the Old Boys Cup for being the senior swimming champion. He also won a medal for being part of a winning shooting team. Whilst he had finished 2nd in the 120 yard hurdles and 3rd in the 880 yard senior championship. On 18 January he competed in the Palmerston North Amateur Swimming Club's Carnival at the municipal baths and he won the Manawatu boy's 100 yard race in the intermediate division in a time of 70.15 seconds. He then went to Marton to compete on 20 January and won the 50 yard final, finished second in the 100 yard open handicap, won the dual relay along with “Miss Cameron”, and also won the 50 yard breaststroke. He was also a member of the Y.M.C.A. and over the summer he won their intermediate championship for the 100 yards.

In 1928 Fletcher became the captain of the school 1st XV. The Manawatu Standard reported at the start of the year that he was one of only two backs to be returning but was “one of the most promising backs in the Manawatu”. He was a regular try scorer for the side throughout the year. In their 14–9 Moascar Cup loss to Te Aute College he was involved constantly on attack and defence and scored a “beautiful try”. He injured his ankle in a game against St Patrick in July and missed several matches before returning to play against Napier Boys' High School in their annual match on 15 August. He played well but went off with his ankle causing him trouble in the 3–3 draw.

Towards the end of the 1928 school year Fletcher played for the 1st XI cricket team as an opening batsman. Playing in a pre-season match against a Palmerston men's side he scored 18 runs. Then in November he competed in several events at the school sports day. He finished 2nd in the 220 yard race, 3rd in the 100 yard race, and 2nd in the 440 yard race. He finished 2nd in the long jump with a distance of 17 ft, 10 inches, 2nd in the high jump, and he won the 120 yard hurdles. At the conclusion of the event he was declared the “Senior Champion” and won the Board of Governor's Cup. He had also won the road race for the second year in a row, along with the McSweeney Cup for fielding in cricket, and was again the swimming champion of the school.

=== Rugby union ===
==== Old Boys, Manawatu and Manawhenua ====
After leaving school at the end of 1928 Fletcher joined the Old Boys club in Palmerston North. He began the season playing 4 games in their junior side before debuting for the senior team on 18 May in a 27–20 loss to Feilding Old Boys on the main Oval at the Palmerston North Showgrounds. He was heavily involved in the match and afterwards the Manawatu Times reported that he had been “borrowed for the day from the junior grade” and “was the one player who was consistently solid in defence and attack. His passing was excellent and his kicking judicious”. His first try for the senior side came a week later on 25 May against Woodville. He scored the first points of the match after receiving a pass from Riddell and “raced over” with the match finishing 3–3. He scored another try in a win over Feilding Old Boys on 1 June and the Manawatu Standard said that “Fletcher is a great asset to Old Boys’ back line and if he stands up to senior play he should make a name for himself in Manawhenua football. He set a good example to the other backs in falling back when Old Boys’ line was threatened”. He scored 3 more tries against Athletic on 8 June. He would finish the year having played 13 games for Old Boys, scoring 5 tries and kicking 3 conversions and a penalty. In mid June he was selected to play in a trial match for Manawatu A at Shannon against Horowhenua A. In this period in Manawatu's history they fielded an amalgamated representative side with Horowhenua known as Manawhenua. Fletcher played at centre and kicked 3 conversions in a 15–14 win. The two teams met again on 10 July at the Showgrounds with Horowhenua winning this time by 18 points to 14. Fletcher kicked a penalty and a conversion for the losers. Following the match he was chosen in the Manawhenua side to play Wairarapa on 17 July at centre. On his debut for Manawhenua at the Palmerston North Showgrounds Fletcher played well but Wairarapa won 12–10 after scoring a last minute try. The Horowhenua Chronicle made note of his play when they said “Fletcher was remarkably sound on defence, his tackling being performed in a capable and business-like manner that left his subjects under no misconception as to the solidity of Mother Earth. He did not shine so much on attack as is usually the case, but when it is considered that he was playing his first big representative match, and that he was up against unusually formidable opposition, this is easily understandable. On his game, the quothful Old Boys’ star has certainly consolidated his claims for continued consideration”.

On 27 July he played a match for Manawatu against Bush. He set up a try for winger Page, while he converted a try by the other winger Strange, in a 14–9 win at Pahiatua. He then played in a practice match for Manawatu against “The Rest”, or essentially a Manawatu B team. The main side won 40 points to 8 with Fletcher kicking 2 conversions and a penalty. He was then selected in the Manawhenua side to play in a Ranfurly Shield match against Wairarapa at Memorial Park in Masterton. It was reported that he now weighed 10st 8 lb. Manawhenua were well beaten by 37 points to 16 with Fletcher kicking 2 conversions and 1 penalty. On the opposition was the famous Bert Cooke who Fletcher would later play with at Richmond Rovers after they both converted to rugby league.

On 24 August Fletcher played for Old Boys against Feilding in their final championship game. They had already secured the championship but they won 12–11 to end up 4 competition points ahead of Feilding (21 versus 17). A week later he played in a Manawatu trial match for Town against Country. The Town side won 24 to 9 with Fletcher kicking 2 conversions and a penalty. He was selected in the squad to play for Manawhenua against Hawke's Bay but was ultimately only an emergency player.

He did however get selected for the next 3 matches for Manawhenua against Whanganui, Taranaki, and Wellington B. The match with Wanganui was played on 7 September in Levin. He set up Satherley for an early try, and then scored one of his own in the second half by the posts before being involved in a try for Conrad. The final scores was 35 to 19 in favour of Manawhenua. The match with Taranaki was played at the Showgrounds in Palmerston North before a crowd of 2,000. Manawhenua were well out played, losing 15–3 with Fletcher missing two shots at goal. Fletcher then travelled south with Manawhenua to take on a Wellington B side at Athletic Park on 14 September. Fletcher kicked an early penalty to give Manawhenua a 3–0 lead before they fell behind 17–3 by half time. However they stormed home to win on fulltime 24 to 20. After a match for Old Boys against Kaierau on 4 October between the champions of the Manawatu competition and the champions of the Whanganui competition, Fletcher's rugby season came to an end. The match was for the Licensed Victuallers Cup and was played at the Showgrounds. Kaierau won 18–13 with Fletcher having a quiet game and mainly being called on to defend.

The 1930 season saw Fletcher again playing for Old Boys. He made 12 appearances mostly at centre, scoring 7 tries, kicking 8 conversions and 2 penalties for 43 points. In the first game of the season on 26 April he scored a try and kicked 2 conversions in a 26–11 win over Feilding Old Boys at the Showgrounds. Then 2 weeks later he played in a Manawatu trial for the South team against the North. Manawhenua were due to play the touring British side 3 weeks later so the selectors were staging trial matches earlier than usual in the season. Fletcher kicked a penalty but missed a couple of others shots at goal in a 17–9 loss on 7 May. He was selected in the Manawatu side to play Horowhenua on 17 May in Levin as part of another trial match. He was involved in their first try and had a try for himself ruled out through a forward pass in a 10–3 win. It was said after the match that “Fletcher, Riddell and Akuira, the Manawatu trio were distinctly preferable to Bevan, Westwood and Bull”.

Fletcher was perhaps unsurprisingly then chosen for the Manawhenua side to play Britain by selectors J. Ryan and M. Winiata. He was now reportedly weighing 11st 2 lb though in later newspapers this was stated as 11st exactly. The Manawatu Times wrote descriptions of the players and included a small portrait photograph of Fletcher. The comments on him were: “Eric Fletcher (Palmerston North Boys’ High School, Manawatu and Manawhenua). One of the youngest and most versatile members of the team. A fast and very useful centre three-quarter, “Curly” is one of those fortunate people born with the football sense. He is a very attractive back to watch and is an excellent product of the rugby training of the Palmerston North Boys’ High School. “Curly” captained P.N.B.H.S. in 1928 but gained his first fifteen school cap in 1927. He left school at the end of the 1928 and during the 1929 season linked up with Old Boys and represented both Manawatu and Manawhenua. As one of the most important links in the backline of both club and representative teams, he paved the way to many fine movements and both as a scoring back and place-kicker has scored many points for his side”. Manawhenua (red, white, and blue) were well defeated on the scoreboard by 34 points to 8 though were said to have put up a good fight. The Horowhenua Chronicle said “the three-quarter line, Page, Fletcher and Strange, did not see a great deal of the ball but was called on for a lot of solid defensive work. Page and Fletcher in particular tackled with deadly accuracy in many tight corners and generally acquitted themselves well”. With the score 34–5 Fletcher and Page were involved in some “good work” that led to a try for Fletcher on full-time after he burst through gathering a loose ball from a kick near the try line. He took the conversion attempt but missed before a record crowd of around 12,000 at the Palmerston North Showgrounds. It was reported that “Fletcher stood out in the rearguard”.

Fletcher then played a handful of matches before appearing in a Manawatu jersey again to play against Southern Hawkes Bay at Dannevirke on 21 June. Manawatu lost 24–15 in what was described as a “wretched display” with Fletcher's name not mentioned beyond when he kicked off. Then on 2 July he played in a trial match for a Manawatu Town side against Manawatu Country at Johnston Park in Feilding. Fletcher's ‘Town’ side went down 12–6. On 19 July Fletcher played for Manawhenua against Wairarapa at the Showgrounds. They were well beaten by 29 points to 3 with Fletcher scoring Manawhenua's lone try. In an 13 August trial at the Showgrounds between Manawatu and Horowhenua he kicked 5 conversions in a 37 to 3 thrashing.

He was once again selected for the Manawhenua side and would finish the year playing 4 matches for them against Wairarapa, Auckland, Hawke's Bay, and Wellington B. The match with Wairarapa was played on 16 August at Masterton. Once again Manawhenua were well beaten by Wairarapa, losing 32 points to 7. Manawhenua then played the touring Auckland side on 20 August in Palmerston North and went down 21 to 12. Fletcher scored Manawhenua's first try after Tilley had intercepted Berridge's pass and he ran to the corner before passing back on the inside to Fletcher. The Manawatu Standard said that “Fletcher was, without doubt, the outstanding rearguard member, and it is unfortunate that this player cannot see more of the ball in handling bouts”. The Manawhenua team then travelled to New Plymouth to play Taranaki but Fletcher stayed behind and instead turned out for a weakened Manawatu side who played Bush. He scored a try in a 19–14 loss. He then returned to the Manawhenua side for their match against Hawke's Bay on 20 September in Palmerston North. In a tight match Manawhenua scored a surprise win by 4 points to 3. The win was their first of the season as was significant for Fletcher as he was captaining the side. After the match the Manawatu Standard said that “the transfer of Fletcher into the five-eighth position did not show the local player in quite his customary favourable light, his handling close in not being so sure. However, when given more time, he accepted cleanly enough and his kicking proved very useful, for he has a powerful punt. In this respect he resembles All Black Cooke who, despite his light physique, has a phenomenal boot”. Manawhenua's final game of the season was against Wellington B. Wellington had originally promised to send their top side to Palmerston North but later reneged and sent their B team. Despite this they still won in heavy rain with a “gusty win blowing” by 19 points to 6. Fletcher scored one of the home side's tries after chasing a kick, “snapping the ball up and diving over for a great try”.

In 1931 Fletcher began his third season for Old Boys. He played 14 matches, scoring 2 tries and kicking 5 conversion and 2 penalties. On 20 June he played in a trial for Manawatu for the South side. He kicked a penalty in a 35–21 loss. He was an emergency player for Manawatu v Bush in late July before playing for them against Horowhenua on 5 August. He was playing in one of the five-eighths positions in a 9–8 loss. It was said after the match that he was “an eleventh-hour inclusion”, but played a prominent role with “the length in his kicking being remarkable for one of his light build”. He then played for Manawatu in a midweek game against Te Kawau. He scored a first half try in a 31–6 win in the match at the Showgrounds but went off with an injured leg when the score was 20–3. He then played in Manawatu's second match against Horowhenua at Levin on 16 August. Horowhenua won 12 to 5.

Fletcher was then chosen for the Manawhenua side. Three days later on the 19th Fletcher journeyed to Masterton to play against Wairarapa. Wairarapa won by 29 points to 17. He scored a try after he “cut in beautifully” and was involved in some attacking movements. On 29 August Fletcher appeared for Manawhenua against a weakened Hawke's Bay side at McLean Park in Napier. The local side won 13 to 10 with it said by a local reporter that “Fletcher attacked and defended in capable style.

Manawhenua hosted the touring Otago at the Palmerston North Showgrounds on 3 September. Fletcher was back in the centres and he was involved on attack and defence several times. His only contribution to the scoreboard was a conversion of captain Colin Le Quesne's try late in the match which was witnessed by 3,000 spectators. Just 2 days later they played on the same ground against Wanganui. The field was described as a “quagmire” and Fletcher was appointed captain in Le Quesne's absence. Manawhenua won 20 to 6 with Fletcher scoring 11 of their points through 2 tries, a conversion, and a point. His first try came after following up after a kick and then he also converted it. He then scored again after taking a pass from Graham and “cut through between Morgan and Williams and raced away to score a brilliant try”. His last scoring act was to kick a penalty which gave them a 14–3 lead.

Fletcher played his 5th match for Manawhenua on 16 September in Palmerston North. The match was played in a “steady breeze” with rain falling. Early in the match Fletcher “electrified the crowd with a brilliant cut in”. He was involved in two of their tries through passing movement and several other attacking plays but Manawhenua nonetheless went down 13 to 9. Manawhenua's penultimate game of the season was against Wellington B at Athletic Park in Wellington. It was played in front of 2,000 people and saw the Wellington side win 33 to 21 after a 22–0 halftime lead. Fletcher missed an early penalty and was involved in a couple of attacking movements in the first half but otherwise had a quiet game. Fletcher's final game for Manawhenua was against Wairarapa at Palmerston North on 26 September. They won 26 to 22 with Fletcher heavily involved. After a couple of near misses he scored after he “raced up and kicked the ball across to the goal front and, streaking after it, found the bounce just what the doctor ordered and raced over by the posts”. Then a while later after some build up work from his fellow backs he received the ball and “side-stepping his way through for another good try” giving them a 21–13 lead after the successful conversion. Later on he blocked multiple attacks and “was proving a tower of strength, both on attack and defence”. He was one of only 7 players who played all 7 of Manawhenua's matches during the year. He was their top scorer with 5 tries, 2 conversions and a penalty for 22 points. His season finished with a 16–9 knockout cup loss to Feilding Old Boys while playing for Old Boys though he did manage to cross the try line once more.

At the start of the 1932 season Fletcher was elected on to the Old Boys club's committee however he was not to stay for the full season. He played just 9 matches, scoring 4 tries, kicking 7 conversions and 2 penalties before leaving Palmerston North. He had been in good enough form to be nominated by the sole selector from the Manawatu Union (A. W. Thompson) for the North Island side however he was ultimately not chosen. A rugby correspondent for the Manawatu Standard had said that Fletcher “appears to have developed additional speed this season. Some of his sharp bursts are phenomenal”. One of his final appearances before departing was for South in the trial against North at the Showgrounds on 18 June. The match was drawn 9–9 with Fletcher scoring after being first to the ball following a kick. On 25 June he played his last match for Old Boys against Kia Toa and the same day the Manawatu Standard wrote a lengthy piece about his rugby career to that point. It said that he "intends leaving for the north on Monday on a holiday and may definitely settle there. The intimation will be sincerely regretted by all local players and enthusiasts, irrespective of the clubs they support, for it is readily granted that Fletcher is one of the most promising rugby exponents this centre has possessed for a long time past, and one whom Manawatu and Manawhenua can ill afford to lose"... "Of a somewhat light frame, Fletcher has been repeatedly likened to Cooke, the former brilliant All Black, for despite his comparative lightness he can get tremendous power behind his kicking, has a fund of pace and elusiveness, and has football brains. With those attributes at his command Fletcher should go far if given the opportunity and, much as lovers of the game will regret his departure, he will carry with him everyone's best wishes for the future". It was then reported on 2 July that he had indeed departed for Auckland.

==== Move to Auckland, Technical Old Boys and Auckland representation ====
After moving to Auckland Fletcher joined the Technical Old Boys club. They were the Old Boys of Seddon Technical College which was a school based at the top of Wellesley Street in the city before later moving out to Carlton near Cornwall Park and renaming themselves. After several mergers over the following decades they are now a part of the Grammar TEC rugby club. His first match for them was against Grafton on 9 July. The New Zealand Herald made mention of him saying Technical Old Boys “will be strengthened by the inclusion at centre three-quarter of Fletcher, an ex-Manawatu representative”. It was said after the match that his play was “closely watched by the team's supporters. Fletcher received very few opportunities, but by one or two of his actions he showed that he has unusual ability, and that he should be an asset to the team”. In his second game against Marist he scored both of Technical's tries in a 12–6 loss, with it reported that “no player earned as much favourable comment as did the Technical centre, Fletcher, the former Manawatu representative, … a thrustful player of more than ordinary ability, Fletcher repeatedly broke through the defence by means of his deceptive runs”. After matches against Grafton and Manukau he missed selection for the Auckland B team against Thames Valley and was said to be “unfortunate” as he had been “displaying great form since arriving in Auckland, proving himself to be one of the brainiest backs playing here”. He was however selected to play centre for Auckland B against South Auckland (partly modern day Waikato) at Eden Park on 20 August. Auckland B won 13 to 11 with Fletcher moving from centre to second five at halftime, switching places with Harold Tetley, then later in the half he moved to the wing, swapping with K Carter. The following weekend in an 11–0 loss to Grammar Fletcher was prominent and the “most effective back” but had to leave the field with an injury. After matches against Otahuhu and Manukau Fletcher was chosen for the Auckland match against Thames. Thames was a sub union of Auckland at this time and so it was not a full ‘Auckland’ team. The match was played on 8 October in Thames on Rhodes Park. Thames won the match 15 to 12 with the only mention of Fletcher was for a nice deep kick that put Thames in trouble. It was his final match of the season.

The 1933 season was to be his final playing rugby for some time. He began on 22 April playing for Technical Old Boys in a practice match before 2 competition games against North Shore and College Rifles however he injured a knee at some point early in the season. There was no mention of it in the Auckland newspapers but the Manawatu Standard said “I would almost appear as though his doubtful knee is keeping “Curly” Fletcher out of the game this season, for a perusal of the teams participating in Auckland failed to disclose his name”.

=== Rugby league ===
==== Richmond Rovers ====
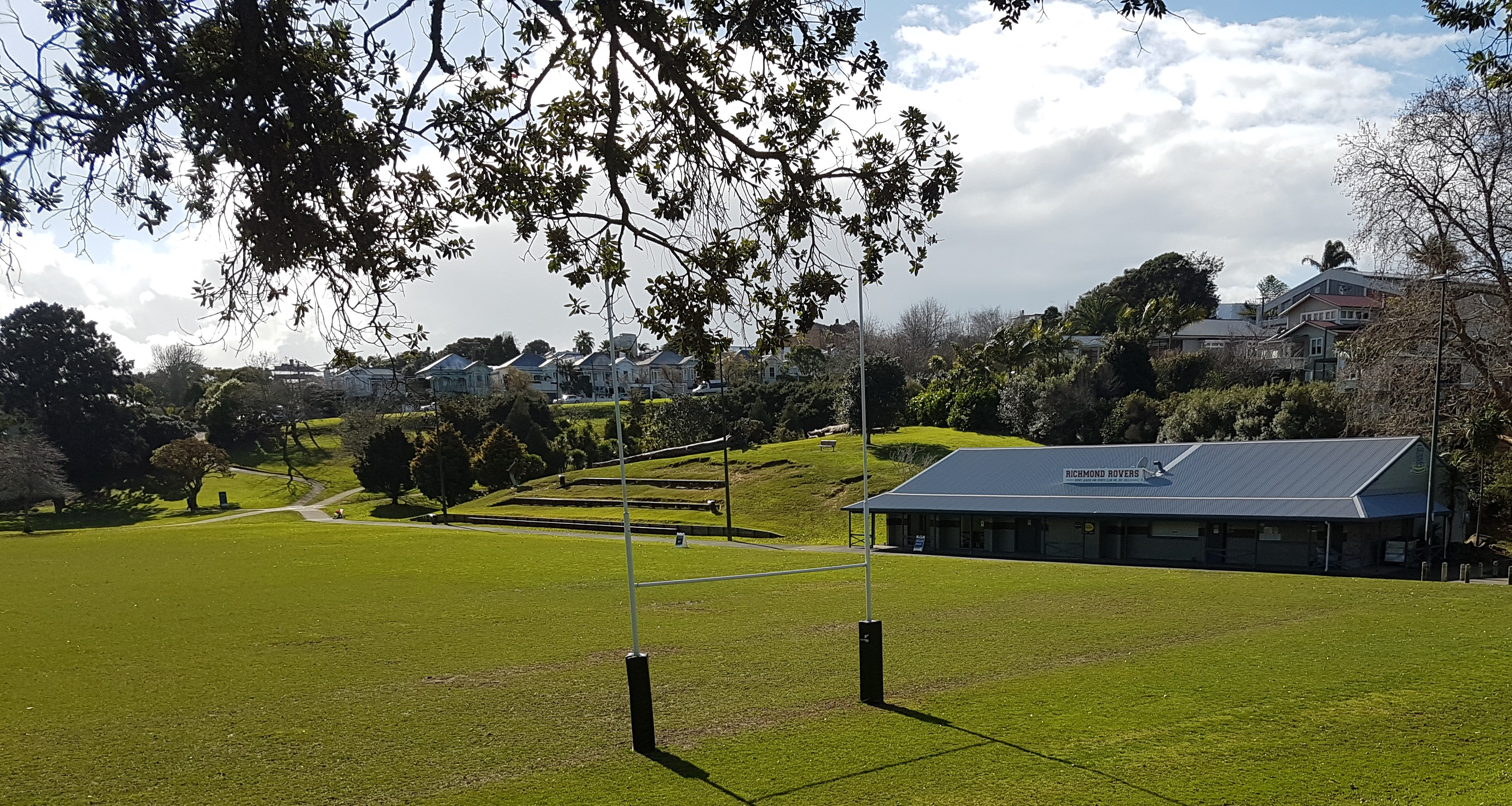
Richmond Rovers RL club and grounds where Eric Fletcher played from 1934 to 1936.

Fletcher had not played for over a year before he appeared in Richmond Rovers rugby league's senior side on 14 July 1934 against Newton Rangers. The match was played at Carlaw Park on the number 1 field. He played at centre and played well over all but made a mess of a try when he knocked on whilst attempting to pick the ball up on the try line with “no opponents within 20 yards”. The New Zealand Herald said he “showed promise as second five-eighths for Richmond and when settled down he should be very prominent. He showed on the few occasions he got the ball on attack that he can seize an opening quickly and run his supports into good positions”. On 18 July his registration with rugby league was confirmed with it reported “Mount Eden to Richmond” which was likely the suburb he was living in. In a 13–10 win over Marist Old Boys the following weekend he was said to be “prominent on attack”. Then after the game against City Rovers on 4 August the Auckland Star said he protected Jack Satherley at full-back well and he “has the makings of a fine player”. On 18 August in the first round of the Roope Rooster competition he scored 2 tries in a 26–5 win over Devonport United. He was said to be “settling down to the game well and is a most promising young player, who should go far in the code. He shows cleverness and good anticipation on attack, while being sound on defence”. He scored a try in their 20–13 Roope Rooster final win over Marist at Carlaw Park. On 29 September he played for Richmond against the touring Western Suburbs side who had recently won the New South Wales competition. Richmond upset them 18–16 before a crowd of 15,000 at Carlaw Park with Fletcher kicking 2 conversions. Fletcher was opposite Stan Tancred, the Western Suburbs centre. With Richmond trailing 13–8 he cross kicked and it beat Hines with O’Neil getting to the ball and scoring wide out. With Fletcher goaling from near the touchline to tie the scores. He then converted Roy Powell's try to make the score 18–13 with Richmond hanging on for the win. It was said afterwards that he was “steady at centre but did not appear to get a good service of the ball”. A week later Richmond played Western Suburbs for a second time and once again won by 10 points to 3 before 13,000 spectators at Carlaw Park. Fletcher missed a conversion and penalty but was said to have been “good at centre, and while varying his methods, was sound on defence”. While the Herald said he “was one of the best Richmond backs, his tackling again being splendid. His final match of the season was for Richmond against Newton Rangers in the Stormont Shield champion of champions match. Richmond won easily by 21 points to 5 with “Fletcher, Prentice, and Powell making the play neatly as inside backs”. By winning the match Richmond had created history by become the first team in Auckland senior rugby league to win the Fox Memorial Shield, Roope Rooster, and Stormont Shield in the same season. Fletcher was originally selected to play in an Auckland Colts side to play against Tamaki (Auckland Māori) on 20 October but he was not in the match day side.

==== Auckland and New Zealand ====
In 1935 the Herald in a preview of the season said that “much can be expected of E. Fletcher, who made a good impression at centre toward the latter end of the season”. For Richmond he played 14 matches in total, scoring 5 tries, kicking 5 conversions and 1 penalty for 27 points. He had moved into the second five eighth spot outside Noel Bickerton and the Auckland Star reported after a round 3 match against Devonport United that they were “as good a pair of five-eighths seen together this season”. The following week after a game against Ponsonby United on 18 May he was described as “steadying” and “incisive” with his attack. While his “fine tackling” was also noted and the herald stated he is fulfilling the promise he showed last season, and is a tower of strength to the team on defence, besides being good on attack”.

On 20 July Richmond played a match at the Winter Showgrounds in Wellington against the Wellington representative side and won 32 points to 4 in front of 3,000 spectators. It was mentioned in the Manawatu Standard that following the game Fletcher “took the opportunity” “to visit his parents in Palmerston North” after the game. It was also reported that he had given his playing boots to his younger brother Keith (7 years his junior) who was playing for the Palmerston North 1st XV like his brother had years ago. However he had not enjoyed his new boots once back in Auckland and had Keith send the old ones north to him.

Interestingly Fletcher had started the year having mostly played at centre but he had moved into second five-eighth and had also switched with Cooke at fullback during a match with Marist. Then on 27 July he replaced New Zealand at halfback in their match against City Rovers. He scored a “doubtful” try but “played ably” and Richmond won 19 to 6 which forced a playoff for the championship with Mount Albert United which they won 14–9 to claim their second consecutive Fox Memorial title.

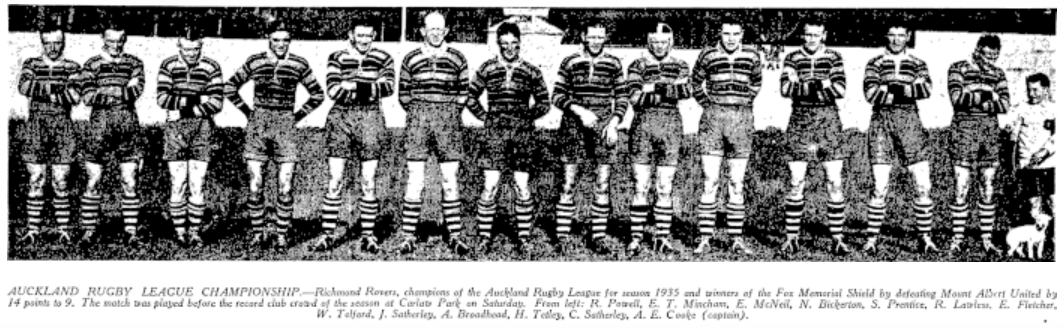
The 1935 Fox Memorial Shield winning Richmond Rovers side prior to their final win over Mount Albert United. Eric Fletcher is 7th from the left.

The weekend prior to the final he had been chosen as a reserve for the Auckland A and B teams which were taking on Taranaki and South Auckland teams at 1:30 and 3:00pm respectively. On 17 August he was chosen in the Auckland A team to play a B team as curtain raiser to the inter-island match. The selectors were looking to see as many players as possible in the lead up to the tour of the Australian team. He played second five with Ted Brimble at five eight. Fletcher had a strong game scoring a try and kicking 4 conversions and a penalty in 22–19 win. The Herald reported that he was “the most impressive back for the A team”. After 2 more matches Fletcher was selected for the Auckland team for their southern tour which included games against Wellington, West Coast, and Canterbury. Against the West Coast Fletcher did play and he kicked a conversion in 32–14 win at Greymouth. He then played against Canterbury at Monica Park in Christchurch with Auckland winning 26 to 13. After returning to Auckland Fletcher missed selection for Auckland in Australia's tour opener on 21 September.

New Zealand upset Australia in the first test at Carlaw Park on 28 September by 22 points to 14, but then were well beaten in the second test 29–8. It was at the point that the selectors looked to make several changes and Fletcher was chosen to make his one and only appearance for New Zealand. He came in to the side replacing his Richmond teammate Powell in the halfback position. He was relatively new to the position having played just two club matches there and the two tour matches for Auckland in the same position. He was playing inside another Richmond teammate Stan Prentice at five eight. The changes had little effect on the result with Australia winning 31 to 8 at Carlaw Park before 20,000 spectators. Fletcher had a relatively quiet game as the Australians “ran rings” around New Zealand. Late in the first half with the game close he missed the conversion of Brian Riley's try with the scores 8–8. Earlier in the match from a scrum he had passed to Prentice who put a kick down field that Riley got to and scored by the posts. He was far more involved in the final match of the Australian tour when they took on Auckland Province with Fletcher again at halfback. Australia won 36 to 18 on 9 October but Fletcher contributed 15 of their points through a try, conversion, and 5 penalties.

==== End of rugby league career ====
Fletcher once again started the year playing for Richmond however his season was cut short by injury and then a move back to Palmerston North. He played the first 4 matches of the 1936 season, kicking a conversion in their round 1 win over Ponsonby United. His injury came on 16 May in the round 3 match against Mount Albert United when he “retired with a foot injury” in the first half. The Herald reported that it was in fact an ankle injury. It was said on 27 May that Fletcher was standing “down owing to injuries” however this was not the case as he had in fact left Auckland and moved back to Palmerston North. Interestingly Eric's younger brother Keith had moved to Auckland (with the family at an earlier point) and registered to play league, joining the Richmond club less than 3 weeks earlier. He went on to play for Richmond until 1939 before he enlisted in the war effort and he later went on to be promoted to the rank of sub-lieutenant in the Navy.

=== Return to rugby union ===
==== Massey College and Manawatu ====
On 27 May it was reported in the Manawatu Standard that Fletcher had applied for reinstatement in rugby union and it had been approved by the New Zealand Rugby Union. Just 3 days later he turned out for Massey College (later renamed Massey University) in Palmerston North. They were playing Feilding A and lost 15–10 on the Showgrounds. The Manawatu Times said “Fletcher, making his first appearance for college, played in their rearguard with fine dash, and had a couple of bright sorties”. After his second match it was reported that he was in the representative frame saying he “appeals most… when here before he was recognised as one of Manawatu's outstanding players and several season in the League should, if anything, have improved his handling”. In the very next match however against Victoria College on 11 June he received a very bad knee injury after making an attacking run into the corner. The “front of his left leg just below the knee, a fairly extensive part of flesh being lacerated to the bone. An operation was carried out last evening [June 11] to aid the healing process, but it was stated that he may be ten days of so in the hospital. This is the second injury Fletcher has received in three matches dislocated on his first appearance”.

He had recovered sufficiently to be named in a 30-man squad for Manawatu 4 weeks later on 6 July. The team would be narrowed down before a South Island tour. On 29 July he was down as an emergency player for Manawatu's match with Horowhenua but on match day he was included at centre. He scored a try with an “electric dash” in a 44–0 win.

Manawatu departed on their South Island tour and the first match was against North Otago at Oamaru on 9 August. Manawatu won 17–11 with Fletcher scoring a try to make the score 12–8 to Manawatu. Their next match was against Otago in a Ranfurly Shield match in Dunedin on 12 August. Before a crowd of 8,000 Manawatu played well but lost 11–5. Fletcher, playing at second five and now weighing 11st 4 lb went well and set up their lone try through a “stab punt” across to R. Gillespie who scored in the corner. The Otago Daily Times published a photograph of the Manawatu team with Fletcher sitting in the front row on the left.

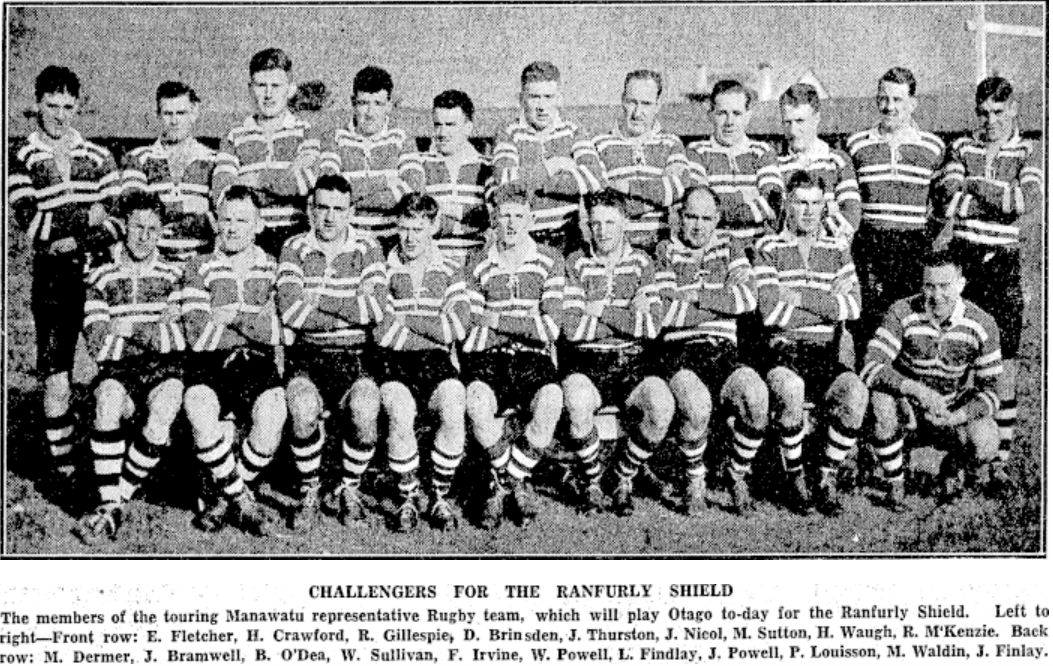
1936 Manawatu team to play Otago for the Ranfurly Shield with Fletcher in the front row on the left

After the match he was amongst 7 of the Manawatu team who were guests at the annual ball for J.R. McKenzie, Ltd. They travelled further south to play Southland on 15 August in Invercargill. Fletcher scored a try in a 13–12 loss. He levelled the scores at 6–6 when he “took advantage of Southland's bad tackling to run through their backs in easy fashion”. He was playing at first five but was replaced late in the match. He was at second five again 4 days later on 19 August for their match with Canterbury at Lancaster Park in Christchurch. Canterbury won 22–9 before a crowd of 6,000. In the Southland match it had been noted that Fletcher had run the ball well but his passing let the team down somewhat but against Canterbury it was said he and Bramwell “were generally content to hand the ball on”. In a tour review by the Manawatu Standard they said “the backs, on defence, all shone out, while Fletcher and Bramwell always played very good football”.

After their return to the Manawatu province they played Wanganui on 29 August. They won 29 to 6 with Fletcher kicking a conversion and he “gave a good account of himself” with his accurate handling along with Thurston at five eighth “being of tremendous value in the passing rushes”. On 5 September Manawatu played Wellington in Palmerston North and lost narrowly, 13–12. Fletcher had moved back to the centre position and scored a try after supporting a break. Four days later Fletcher was again on the scoring sheet with a try against Taranaki again in Palmerston North. Manawatu continued their good form with a 25–22 win. Aside from scoring he was involved in attacking movements throughout the game. Comments on the match said he “was excellent at centre, and kicked to his wings judiciously”. On 12 September Manawatu were again playing at home against Hawke's Bay. They won a close game once more by 12 points to 11. Fletcher gathered a bouncing ball from a missed penalty attempt and “sent a long pass to Waugh” who took it and scored to make it 12–8. They then finished their season with a 28–27 win over Wairarapa in Masterton but it appears that Fletcher did not play after being named in a large travelling squad but not being mentioned at all in any reports of the match.

The 1937 season saw Fletcher as part of the Massey College squad but they didn't play in the entire first round of the competition. In May he was selected to play for Manawatu against Horowhenua however he didn't play. It was reported that he was quitting rugby and going to concentrate on the sport of golf and “in any event, he will be returning to Auckland in three weeks’ time”.

=== Cricket ===
Fletcher was also a handy cricketer in his younger years. He played cricket at school for senior teams including the first XI from 1926 to 1928. After his final season at school he was presented with the McSweeney Cup for fielding at the end of year prize giving. When he left school he joined the Old Boys club, and was named 12th man for Manawatu against Rangitikei for the Hawke Cup which Manawatu were the holders of in mid December 1928. Then at the end of January he played for Manawatu against Wairarapa in a Hawke Cup and scored 35 runs out of a total of 427 while batting at number 9. In the following December he batted at 11 for Manawatu against Poverty Bay and was 0 not out in their first innings. After the game he was selected to play for Manawatu against Taranaki. In January 1930 he was named 12th man for the Manawatu side to play against the touring Marylebone cricket team. At the end of that season his averages for Old Boys in senior club cricket with the bat was 15.1 (136 runs) from 12 innings, with a top score of 38 not out. With the ball he obviously only bowled briefly as he took none for 2 for the season. For Manawatu he had scored 22 runs from 3 innings, had 2 not outs, and a high score of 20*. In mid January, 1931 he made 80 not out in a match for Old Boys against United with the Manawatu Times giving some description of the innings. It was said that he had a slow partnership with L. Spring, and that later “Fortune smiled on Fletcher, who scoring intermittently, stayed to enjoy a short partnership with Ensor. In a partnership with Cameron he was now “batting steadily”. Old Boys later declared at 263/7 with Fletcher unbeaten after having opened. Later in the season he scored 129 against PNBHS, and he finished the season with an average of 39.5 from 8 innings (277 runs). He played relatively little the following summer and there are no records of him playing cricket beyond this point.

=== Golf ===
Fletcher had been playing golf during the year prior to seriously committing himself to it. He played in tournaments most weekends throughout 1937, 1938 and 1939. In late March he won the A grade division of the second stroke handicap as part of the Manawatu Golf Club's Easter tournament. He was beaten by J.F. Field in the Hokowhitu Handicap (1-up) during the same weekend. In 1939 he won the Bloomfields handicap at the Woodville Golf Tournament when he beat F.D. Mackie and then A.J. Morgan in the final.

In April 1939 as part of the North Island championships as part of the Easter Championships section he lost in the semi-finals to Knights. He had earlier beaten M.H. Oram in the first round of Group B, and then defeated J. Coupe. In August at the Hokowhitu tournament he shot the best score in the August Stroke Handicapin A Grade with a 77 (69 including his 8 handicap).

In October 1939 he played in the New Zealand Golf Open at the Miramar Links course from 9 to 11 November. There were 160 golfers competing in a field which did not include any foreign entries owing to the outbreak of the war. He shot 80 in the first round which left him in 34th place in very difficult windy, rainy conditions. In the second round he shot 85 and had dropped to 58th position on the leader board. The conditions were extremely difficult again with a northerly gale blowing and low scores nearly impossible. He made the cut but struggled more in the 3rd and 4th rounds with scores of 83 and 86 to finish 52nd with a score of 334, 41 shots behind the winner John Hornabrook. He continued to play golf through 1940 but played less beyond that due to the war.

== Personal life ==
Eric was educated at Campbell Street School, now named Takaro School, before progressing to Palmerston North Boys’ High School. After moving to Auckland the 1935 census showed that he worked as a Fruiterer. Then after moving back to Palmerston North he took on work as a garage attendant and was living at 320 Ferguson Street in 1938. From the 1960s until the 1980s Eric's occupation was listed as a clerk and he lived at 8 Winston Avenue in Palmerston North the entire time.

Eric Fletcher married Nina May Offwood in 1941. She also played golf and they played together years before their marriage, including in the Awatapu opening day competition at the Palmerston North Golf Club in April 1939 which they won. Fletcher was called up for service on 6 August 1941 but never went away to fight. His older brother Lloyd and younger brother Keith both served in the war. Lloyd was killed in action in Tunisia, North Africa on 26 March 1943. In an article in the newspaper following his death it was said that he had attended Palmerston North Boys High School from 1922 to 1925 and had been managing a farm in the Manawatu District at the time of his enlistment. Keith had enlisted in the navy as a volunteer reserve. He was promoted to sub lieutenant in 1944 whilst with the Royal New Zealand Naval Volunteer Reserve.

On 24 September 1942 they had a daughter named Meryll Yvonne Fletcher at “Rostrata”. She died aged just 2 on 14 September 1944. They were living at 12 Phoenix Avenue in Palmerston North at the time and Meryll was buried at Kelvin Grove Cemetery.

Eric died on 15 April 1996 and was buried at Kelvin Grove Cemetery in Palmerston North. His wife Nina died on 4 June 2006 and was also buried at Kelvin Grove Cemetery.
