= Walter Brimble =

NZ international rugby league player (1911–1990)

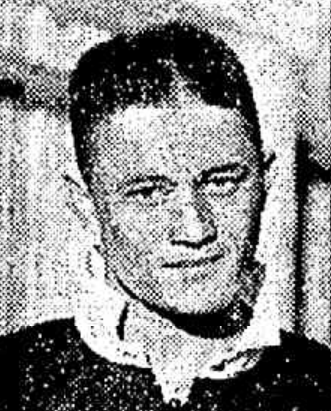

Personal information
- Full name: Walter Pierrepont Brimble
- Born: 16 October 1911 Molteno, Eastern Cape, South Africa
- Died: 1990 (aged 78–79) Auckland, New Zealand

Playing information
- Weight: 10 st 7 lb (67 kg)

Rugby union
- Position: Five-Eighth, Second Five-Eighth
Club
Years	Team	Pld	T	G	FG	P
1932–36	Manukau Rovers	74	10	3	0	38
Representative
Years	Team	Pld	T	G	FG	P
1934–35	Auckland B	2	0	0	0	0

Rugby league
- Position: Stand-off
Club
Years	Team	Pld	T	G	FG	P
1936–39	Manukau	58	13	0	0	39
1940	Newton Rangers	3	0	0	0	0
1941	Manukau	1	0	0	0	0
	Total	62	13	0	0	39
Representative
Years	Team	Pld	T	G	FG	P
1937–38	Auckland	3	1	0	0	3
1936	North Island	1	1	0	0	3
1938	New Zealand	8	2	0	0	6
- Relatives: Ted Brimble (brother); Wilfred Brimble (brother)

Walter Pierrepont Brimble (16 October 1911 – 1990) was a rugby league player who represented New Zealand. He played eight matches for New Zealand on their tour of Australia in 1938, becoming the 257th player to represent New Zealand. He also played three matches for Auckland in 1937–38, and one match for the North Island in 1938. He played senior club rugby union for Manukau from 1932 to 1936 and two games for Auckland B before switching to rugby league where he joined the Manukau club.

== Early life ==
Walter Brimble was born on 16 October 1911, in Molteno, Eastern Cape, South Africa. His father was Englishman Harold Pierrepont Brimble and his mother was (Jane) Depua Mahadna. She was a Bantu woman and worked as a nurse. Harold was originally working as a railways electrician from Bristol and had moved to South Africa as a 17-year-old with friends looking for work. While there he enlisted in the British Army and was badly wounded in the Boer War. Jane was his nurse and she nursed him back to health. They were married soon after and had five sons while living in South Africa before leaving apartheid South Africa on 9 March 1912. Their sons and ages when they departed South Africa were John (6), Cyril (4), Ted (2), and twins Walter and Lionel (4 months old). They originally moved to Australia, but their whites settlement law caused them to move again. They travelled to Sydney before boarding the Makura for Hawaii on 6 May 1912. While living in Honolulu for 2 years they had another son, Wilfred Brimble on 16 November 1913 who would also go on to represent New Zealand at rugby league.

On 21 April 1915, the family departed Honolulu, Hawaii destined for Auckland on board the SS Niagara. The family travelled in steerage. Harold's occupation was stated as "salesman", John and Cyril were "students" and Jane a "housewife". The whole family was listed, with ages in brackets as Harold P. (34), John (9), Cyril (7), Edward (Ted) (5 and a half), Lionel (3), Walter (3), Jane (30), and Wilfred (1). They were all listed as being English as nationality aside from Jane who was listed as "African" and Wilfred whose nationality was American as he had been born in Hawaii. The family settled in Onehunga, a modern-day suburb in central Auckland though at that time was considered more on the southern boundary of urban Auckland. While there a seventh son, Amyas, was born on 4 April 1917. Amyas and Harold both died in the Spanish Flu Epidemic; Harold died on 21 November 1917, aged 37, while Amyas died on 17 May 1920, aged 3.

== Playing career ==
The first mention of Walter in the Auckland newspapers was for coming second in a race at the Manukau Cruising Club's annual regatta on February 20, 1926. The club was located on the shore of the Manukau Harbour in Onehunga. He was competing in the Boys' Race and his older brother Ted, who often went by the nickname "Bunny" came first. Older brothers Cyril and John placed in other races that were held. Aside from rugby union and rugby league it was mentioned in an article in The Rugby League News in Australia in 1938 that "apart from football, the Brimbles have distinguished themselves in boxing and track athletics, and Walter won a caddies' golf championship. Walter and Lionel, the twins are keen yachtsmen".

=== Rugby Union ===
==== Manukau Rovers Rugby Football Club ====
The first mention of him in association with rugby was being named in the team list for a 7th Grade match for Manukau Rovers against Green Lane on June 11, 1927. He was playing alongside twin brother Lionel. The following year on May 30 the Sun (Auckland) newspaper published a brief piece titled "The Seven Brimbles". It stated "the stocky Brimble, who is always in the thick of any scrummage in which Manukau is implicated, belongs to a rugby family that puts all other claimants to the description into the shade. Besides this Brimble there are six more, each one them plays in a different grade for Manukau. That is there are seven grade teams, and seven Brimbles, one for each. Saturday in the Brimble family is a big day. Now bring on your records". The article was slightly exaggerated in that there in fact were only 6 playing. After the death of father Harold, and youngest child Amyas around a decade earlier there were only 6 remaining males in the family. At the end of year prize giving Walter was presented with the Dodd Cup as captain of the 6th Grade side. The trophy was for the team with the highest aggregate number of points scored. In 1929 Walter and Lionel were still playing in the 6th Grade side. Their side won the 6th grade championship (Northern Roller Mills Cup) and were presented with their winners caps at Manukau's annual prizegiving along with the championship cup and the Dodd's Cup.

Walter was not mentioned in relation to the Manukau rugby club in 1930, then in 1931 a "W Brimble" was granted a reinstatement to rugby union. It is likely this was Walter as Wilfred was two years his junior and less likely to have switched codes as he was only 16 in 1930 while Walter was 18. The "W Brimble" in question was said to have attended the board for reinstatement "in person". Older brother Ted had switched from the Manukau rugby seniors to the Newton Rangers rugby league club in June 1930.

===== Senior debut =====
In 1932 Walter began the year in the Manukau Senior B team. He was listed in their side for their opening game on May 14 until their July 9 match. It is likely that Walter made his debut for the club's Senior A team on July 30 when he was named in one of the five eighth's positions alongside R. Stuart. They were playing Training College at the Epsom Showgrounds on the No. 1 field at 3 pm in the Pollard Cup and won 6 to 5. He played in further matches against University on August 20, and Ponsonby on September 3. In the later match Ponsonby won 16–13 in what was described as the best match seen at Eden Park in the season. The Prime Minister George William Forbes was in attendance. The New Zealand Herald wrote that "Manukau was weakened by the absence of [Leo] Heazlewood and [Arnold] Berridge, but the substitute five-eighths, W. Brimble proved a distinct find". The Auckland Star was effusive in their praise, saying "Brimble, a substitute five-eighth, did all that was asked of him and a good deal more. In fact, Brimble was one of the best backs on the field. Early on he showed himself to be a player above the ordinary run of club five-eighths. He studied the outlook before making a move, and plied his men round him with subtle and generous touch. His display was one of the best exhibitions of five-eighths play seen on Eden Park this year". The round was marred by the death of the Otahuhu captain, and All Black, Bert Palmer who died after collapsing in their match against University at the Showgrounds after breaking his neck.

Brimble played against Waihi in a friendly match on September 10, and then in a game against Training College on September 17 which they lost 13–0 after missing some of their regular players. Brimble was said to have been the pick of the backs along with Arnold Berridge and Stuart, and he "played a fine game, and did more straight running than his mates". Arnold Berridge was a long time Auckland representative player from the late 1920s and early to mid 1930s. Brimble played in a game against Technical Old Boys on September 24 and then in a game with College Rifles the following week on October 1 he scored his first senior try. The match was the final of the Pollard Cup competition and Manukau won 12–5. The Auckland Star said "Brimble was lively all through, his try being a smart piece of work". His final match of the year came in a game between Manukau and Whakatāne at Onehunga on October 8. The Whakatane side which was made up entirely of Māori players won 17 to 8.

===== 1933 Manukau rugby =====
The 1933 season saw Walter Brimble start the season in the senior side and he went on to play 20 games, scoring 4 tries. His first came in their opening game against Grammar on April 29 in the main match at Eden Park. Manukau lost 17–14 with the Auckland Star commenting that Manukau have "an electric little first five eighth" and that "the elusive Brimble was a real danger and often flashed through the defence [though] far too often his good work was in vain". The Herald said he showed "good head work" and his try came after a passing movement involving several teammates. On May 6 the Manukau backs were disappointing in a 12–0 loss to University though Hunter and Berridge played well, and "there were odd occasions when Brimble did brilliant things". He "played a nippy game at first five-eighths, making one or two nice openings. He allowed Mulvihill to get past him once or twice, however". Manukau then struggled again, this time at home in Onehunga, losing 8–0 to Marist Old Boys. Brimble had to play at halfback in place of Webster who went off injured early in the match and was said to have been "prominent" and made a couple of nice kicks during the game. On May 27 Manukau lost to Grafton in Onehunga 23–11, with Brimble "lively". The Herald wrote "Brimble, the Manukau second five-eighths, was very nippy, and his solo efforts trouble the opposition". In the second half with Grafton attacking "Brimble turned the tables with a high kick" that eventually resulted in Papper scoring between the posts". On June 3 Manukau was held scoreless for the third time in a 17–0 loss to College Rifles. Brimble, "the diminutive second five eighths, displayed his usual nippiness and was always on the alert". On June 10, Manukau suffered an unlucky defeat, with the scores at 8–8 with time almost up Otahuhu scored a try to win. Brimble was "brilliant on occasions" and he scored one of their tries. The Herald wrote that "the shining light in the opening spell was Brimble at five eighths. He dodged and side-stepped to advantage and scored a fine try" after securing the ball following an "open rush" and "darting over near the posts" after earlier making "a fine weaving run". They lost again on June 17, 11–3 to Ponsonby before a very large crowd at the Showgrounds. He was among the best of the Manukau backs along with Hunter, Berridge, and T. Allen. At times he was "elusive and clever, but spoiled many movements by knocking the ball on frequently". At one stage he took "a brilliant interception" and moved play back to halfway, and was unlucky to receive a bad pass from Fleet after a break by Berridge.

Manukau had their first on field win of the season after an earlier default victory, when they beat Technical Old Boys 11–3 on June 24 at Onehunga. Brimble was "fast off the mark and difficult to lay by the heels" according to the Auckland Star's writer. He was seen in some nice attacking movements with Hunter and Berridge, and "was very elusive and tricky". On July 1 they lost again with a 5–0 loss to Grammar which confined them to the bottom of the table after 10 rounds. Despite Brimble "making many fine openings" and he nearly set up a try with Carrington tackled on the line after he had beaten several opponents". They then drew with Training College on July 8 with Brimble passing to Benjamin to score after a Berridge intercept. During the game he was "quick off the mark and needed constant watching". In a 6–3 loss to University on July 5 the Manukau backs struggled to handle the ball with "Brimble being the exception", and he "was easily the best of them, his defence being of great value to his side". Manukau drew with Grafton in a July 29 game where "Brimble was always conspicuous".

On August 5 Manukau was supposed to play Parnell in the Jubilee Cup competition but defaulted and Ponsonby stepped in to play in a friendly match. Ponsonby won 10 to 9 with Brimble scoring one of Manukau's tries. Brimble played in further games against College Rifles (August 12), Pukekohe (August 19), and Otahuhu (September 3). In the later match Manukau won 8–4 which moved them up to 7th out of 10. Brimble, gave the "best all-round display", as "both on attack and defence he played one of his best games, and received a great hearing from his supporters". At one point after a long forward rush "Brimble judiciously kicked to Flett, who following up fast, crossed the line and scored". In an upset 13–12 win over Ponsonby at Eden Park on September 9, "Brimble and Berridge collaborated well".

On September 23 Manukau traveled to Whangārei to play the City club from there. Manukau won 16 to 11 with Brimble playing "a fine game" before a crowd of 800. Upon returning to Auckland, Manukau continued their revival with a 9–7 win at Eden Park over the Marist side which was tied for the championship lead prior to the match. The Herald said Brimble "exploited the short kick to some effect". Manukau then played their final game of the season beating Technical Old Boys 9–8 at the Showgrounds. Brimble scored a try in the first half and set up another for Poulton. The Auckland Star wrote that his "nippiness on attack was the outstanding feature of his play". The Herald said that he "combined splendidly" with Hunter at halfback and was "elusive and clever".

===== 1934 Manukau Rugby =====
At their annual meeting in 1934, Walter's older brother, John, was elected on to the executive committee of the Manukau club. He had retired from playing for the seniors for many years a couple of years prior. In Manukau's opening game of the season they defeated Otahuhu 13–8 at Sturges Park in Ōtāhuhu. Hatfield passed to Brimble who scored in the first half, then later in the game Hatfield (who was playing halfback), "sent the ball out smartly to Brimble, whose nippiness was a source of trouble to the opposing side". The Herald noted Arthur Berridge and Brimble made "many openings" during the game. They then beat University 14–13 at Eden Park on April 28. Early in the game with the Manukau forwards dominating "Brimble beat Green, the University first five-eighths, several times, only to find his passes go astray". He was said to be one of the backs to have played an "excellent game".

Manukau notched their third win to start the year with a 5–0 win over Technical. Brimble was said to have played a "resourceful game" at first five eighth. After the match he was chosen by the Auckland selectors to practice in the 21-man Auckland squad for a June 4 game against Waikato. Another win for Manukau followed on May 19 when they beat College Rifles 9–8 at Eden Park. He was "as elusive as ever, and given good service by Hatfield, he was always dangerous". The pair of Hatfield and Brimble "worked well together". Brimble didn't play in Manukau's next match on May 26 which they lost 19–6. The Auckland Star said that he "was very badly missed, that excellent little player having contracted a dose of the popular flu". Brimble returned to the side a week later on June 2 which they lost 13–3 to Grafton. Hatfield had got injured halfway through the game and Brimble moved into the half back position for the remainder of the contest.

==== Auckland B debut ====
Brimble missed out on selection in the full Auckland side to play Waikato, but was named in the Auckland B team to play against Thames Valley at Rhodes Park in Thames on June 4. Auckland B won the match 25 points to 14. Returning to the Manukau side Brimble "was not in the picture as much as usual" in their 8–3 win against Marist Old Boys. Despite this he was involved in their first try after taking a pass from Hatfield and made a good run before passing to Poulton who scored. Then later he took a pass from Berridge and scored under the posts. There was less coverage of games in the following weeks and little mention of Brimble until a 0–0 draw with Technical Old Boys on July 14. The competition had split into a top half and bottom half, with Manukau in the higher grouping. They had suffered a defeat in the first game of the second round against Otahuhu before this draw. The Auckland Star said Brimble "was responsible for some very fine work". On August 4 they beat Grafton 6–3 which put them in a tie for first with their opponent on 17 competition points. During the second half with Manukau leading 3–0 Brimble took the ball at top speed from Hatfield and cut out his man and sent the ball to Berridge "who went over for a splendid try". Then in another win, against University in the main match at Eden Park the forwards played well "with a rare flash of individualism by the two Manukau five-eighths, Brimble and Poulton".

Brimble was selected for the Auckland B practice squad for another game against Thames on September 1. He was named in the reserves to play in the game and was not required to take the field. His next game was for Manukau against Tukapa on September 8 in New Plymouth at Pukekura Park. He "played an excellent game and took the fancy of the New Plymouth fans" in a 20–9 loss. The Taranaki Daily News said "Hatfield and Brimble were the best of the Manukau backs... Brimble was smart off the mark and at times caught the opposition napping". In a lengthy match report Brimble was mentioned many times for being involved in attacking play with several good runs down field.

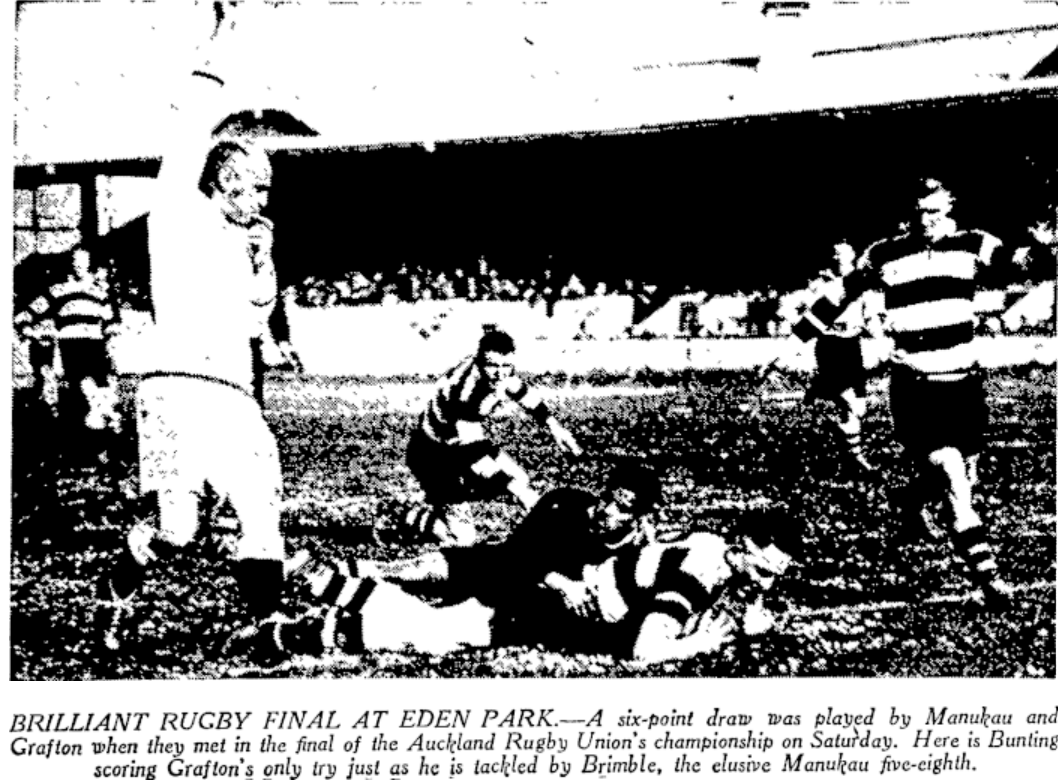

After returning to Auckland, Manukau played the championship final against Grafton as both teams had been level on points. The match resulted in a 6–6 draw with a photograph of Brimble tackling Bunting of Grafton as he scored published in the Auckland Star. With no extra time played in this era the match was replayed the following week on September 29. Grafton won the match and the title. The Herald remarked that "Brimble’s last couple of games were below his best form" and that he and Poulton in the five-eighths "gave promise earlier on of developing into a good combination. Their attack was all right, but their defence proved weak".

At Manukau's end of season prize-giving and social at the Foresters' Theatre in Onehunga on October 31 he was among the players congratulated for gaining representative honours which also included Leo Heazlewood who had played representative rugby for Wellington, the South Island, the North Island, Auckland, and later Canterbury as well as being an All Black trialist on multiple occasions, and Cyril Pepper who became an All Black in 1935. In the same month of October, Walter's younger brother, Wilfred transferred from the Manukau 3rd Grade rugby side to the Newton Rangers rugby league club, joining their older brother Ted. Ted had been at the club for 3 seasons by this point and in 1932 had made his one and only appearance for New Zealand.

===== 1935 Manukau Rugby =====
Brimble continued to play for Manukau in 1935 and was named in their senior side to play Grafton in their season opening game on April 27. He was marking Brian Killeen, who was an ex-representative player from Wellington and became an All Black in 1936. Manukau lost 26 to 13 with the Herald speculating that "it may be worth the experiment of trying Brimble behind the pack, as he is quick and of the right type for a half". On May 4 Manukau drew with Technical Old Boys 11–11. McCormick started at first five-eighths with Brimble at second as Manukau kept things in the forward, before the players switched, with Brimble coming in close. The two combined for a scissor movement described as "one of the prettiest movements of the match". Manukau then lost to Otahuhu, 14–8 at Sturges Park. In the second half Brimble "made a brilliant cut in and passed to McCormick" who scored. He was said to be "the outstanding back on the field". Manukau had their first win against University by 14 points to 7 on May 18. Brimble and McCormick were "both more reliable and more versatile than the ‘Varsity five eighths and were usually going at top when they got the ball". Their following match at Onehunga against Marist was described as being full of "rough play" with Manukau winning 11–8. Brimble was "outstanding" along with several other teammates for the winners. Though Brimble did make a centring kick that saw Marist gain possession with a clear run down field to score a try. During the following week, Walter's twin brother Lionel was reinstated to rugby so had obviously had a brief stint playing rugby league at the start of the year.

An Auckland Star writer thought that Brimble should have been named in the squad of 38 players chosen by the selectors for the Auckland A and B teams. Another writer to the newspaper questioned whether the selector had seen Manukau play this season and said "I venture to state that W. Brimble if given a chance would prove himself the best first five-eighths in Auckland". Manukau lost 11–6 to Grafton in their June 1 game at the Showgrounds. Brimble was said to be "not up to standard" though lacked opportunities. They lost again 6–3 to College Rifles on June 8 at Eden Park though Brimble "played well at times" and "combined well with" Hatfield at halfback. In a 22–22 draw with Ponsonby on July 6 Brimble and McCormick "never failed on defence and, with sometimes brilliant penetration, initiated several delightful movements". Manukau then lost to Otahuhu in the last few minutes on July 20 at the Showgrounds. Brimble scored his first points of the year with a try and penalty. Stuart "cut straight through to make an easy try for Brimble" in the first half while his penalty came during the second half. Manukau lost heavily to University 2 weeks later by 31 points to 6. Three of their points came from the boot of Brimble who also "played a very colourful game in the centre".

==== Auckland B ====
Brimble was named in the reserves for Auckland B to play South Auckland (Waikato) on July 27 at Pukekohe. He was ultimately not required to take the field. Then on August 8 he was selected by Mr. R.F. Galbraith at first five eighth to play for Auckland B against Thames Valley at Waihi on August 10. He was partnered in the five-eighths with N. Vear, with Robert (Bob) Aro at halfback. Before a crowd of 1,200 at Rugby Park in Waihi, Auckland B won 32–14 with Brimble giving "a sound display".

With the club season entering its later stages Manukau lost once more, to Marist by 8 points to 3 and were now second to last in the 8 team competition. In wet conditions Brimble had a drop goal strike the upright and he was said to have "put in a fine afternoon’s work". Another loss followed, 6–3 against Technical Old Boys on August 24 on Eden Park number 2. Brimble and W Hatfield were the "best backs" for Manukau.

On September 21 Manukau played a friendly match against Tukapa who had travelled up from New Plymouth to play at the Showgrounds with Brimble playing. Manukau were well beaten 35–8. Their last game of the year was a 14–8 loss to Grafton at Onehunga. Brimble was "the brightest and most impressive of the Manukau backs". He showed "thrust" when he got the ball and made a break which led to Heighway scoring in the corner, and played "a fine game".

===== 1936 Manukau Rugby =====
The 1936 season was to be the last playing rugby for Walter Brimble as he switched to rugby league towards the end of the season. He was named in their opening game for the season against Grammar at Sturges Park in Otahuhu on May 2. A 5–5 draw resulted with the Auckland Star saying that "little Brimble worked hard". In a 25–8 loss to Grafton on May 23 on Eden Park No. 2 Brimble scored a try for the losers. On May 30 Manukau lost to College Rifles 9–8 on Eden Park No. 2 again. It was said that he "was as sound as ever and showed great soundness of handling as well as penetrative ability". It was his "opportunism" that resulted in Kenneth Hankin scoring in the corner. Another loss followed to Ponsonby on June 6 by 8 points to 3. Brimble and Hankin, playing in the inside backs "were great spoilers and blanketed their opposition". Manukau had four players leave the field injured in a 10–3 loss to Otahuhu at Sturges Park on June 13. Brimble played "his usual sound game".

Manukau had their first win of the season when they easily defeated North Shore 36 to 3. Brimble and Anderson "baffled" North Shore whenever they elected to run instead of set their wings going. The Star wrote that "the hard running Brimble was a great asset. His dodging runs gained a good deal of ground and he was seldom found wanting on defence". He set up a try in the first minute "after a typical run… he did all the work and sent on to Anderson". Then at Onehunga on June 27 Manukau won 11–8 over Training College. Brimble "got through an immense amount of work, but after making good openings was prone to pass wildly".

Manukau travelled to Paeroa to play a friendly match against the local side on July 4. Cyril Pepper (Manukau's All Black), and Brimble played "great football", with Brimble involved in a passing movement leading to a try to Pearce in Manukau's 14–6 win. Manukau then lost to Marist 22–4 on July 11. Brimble had started in the five-eighths but after McLaren, their halfback retired at halftime Brimble moved in to full that position. Brimble and Gordon Littlejohn were "the only backs to impress" for Manukau. In their final match of the Gallaher Shield Manukau drew 0–0 draw with University at Sturges Park, Brimble was "great in the mud". In the first round of the Jubilee Trophy, Manukau upset Grammar 8 to 3. Brimble set up their first try by throwing a long cut out pass to Anderson which caught the opposition out of position. Brimble with Stone in the five-eighths "were steady on defence, while occasional cuts-in and short punts by both players frequently placed the winners on attack". Manukau lost to University in the last minute of their next match on August 1 at Onehunga. Anderson and Schubert made a break for Manukau before Brimble "came on the scene in time" to score. The Herald wrote that "Brimble was Manukau’s most valuable man, his defence being sound and his penetrating runs troubling University". Brimble's career with the Manukau Rugby Club came to an end 2 weeks later in a match with Marist on August 15. He kicked a conversion in a 16–6 win.

=== Rugby League ===
==== Code switch to join Manukau Rugby League Football Club ====
It was reported on September 10 that Walter Brimble had been registered with the Manukau rugby league club. Thus joining his brothers Ted and Wilfred in the Auckland club rugby league competition with Ted and Wilfred at the Newton Rangers club. He had in fact played for Manukau on the weekend prior in round 1 of the Roope Rooster in their 10–8 win over Ponsonby United at Carlaw Park. He was said to be "a newcomer to the code", and "filled Thomas Trevarthan’s place at second five-eighth, but hardly rose to the heights expected of him. With a few more games however, he should be an asset to his new club". The Herald wrote that "Brimble, the former Manukau Rugby Union five-eighths, made a fine opening and carried play to the Ponsonby line, where [Peter] Mahima scored a good try". They went on to say he "was impressive at five eithths" where he was partnered with Jack Hemi.

Manukau had won the championship for the first ever time just prior to Brimble joining the side. It was the first time they had fielded a senior team since 1913 and had recruited heavily before and during the season focussing particularly on rugby union players with many of their team Māori. They then beat Papakura at Prince Edward Park in Papakura on September 12. This put Manukau into the Roope Rooster final where they met City Rovers on September 26 at Carlaw Park. Manukau won 23 to 10 with Brimble scoring his first try in his new code. He "teamed well in the five eighths line" with Hemi. His try was their third and was converted by New Zealand international Puti Tipene Watene. Overall he was said to be "a clever player on attack" with his try "being a brilliant solo effort". His last match of the season was in the Stormont Shield match between Manukau and Richmond Rovers (who had won the championship). The match played on October 3 saw Richmond win easily 30–9. Brimble crossed for another try for Manukau. Jack Brodrick made a 60-yard run before tackling Harold Tetley of Richmond and Angus Gault "snapped up the ball and Brimble was over in a flash". Brimble and Hemi "played good games at five eighths".

==== 1937 Manukau, and Auckland ====
The 1937 Auckland rugby league season saw Brimble play 19 times for Manukau, scoring 5 tries. He also made one appearance for the Auckland representative team against South Auckland (Waikato) on June 9. He was not named in their season opening game, a preliminary round match on April 17. He did however play in their second preliminary round match the following week on April 24. Manukau won easily 37–19 over Newton Rangers with Walter playing opposite his younger brother Wilfred. Walter was said to have been prominent for Manukau while Wilfred played a good game for Newton.

Manukau's first Fox Memorial championship game was on May 1 and saw them beat North Shore Albions 19–12 at Carlaw Park. The Auckland Star wrote that "the brilliance of the Manukau first five eighth, Brimble..." was a feature of the match. In the second half he made a break down the wing which was capped by Colin Murton scoring. The Herald said that he combined well with Hemi and he made some "brilliant openings which paved the way for tries" and also combined well with Peter Mahima. In the team list to play Marist on May 8 he was listed as "R. Brimble", likely due to his nickname being 'Riki'. Manukau won 17–10 with Brimble, Jack Broughton, Jack Hemi, and Colin Murton involved in "a remarkably opportune move" that led to a try. The movement had seen Brimble intercept and then run a long way before kicking with his teammates finishing it off.

Brimble was named as a reserve for Auckland Māori in their game against Auckland Pākehā on May 12. Wilfred was also named among the reserves. Considering neither of them was Māori it highlighted that the selection was as much based on skin colour as ethnicity. Wilfred was listed as "B Brimble" with his nickname being "Bunny". Neither were required to play in the match. Walter played in further games for Manukau against Ponsonby on May 15 and Mount Albert United on May 22 before a 13–13 draw with City Rovers. Walter scored his first try of the year. Brimble "made some splendid openings, while he teamed well with Mahima". His try came after he "cleverly beat the opposition" to equalise the scores and overall he was said to be "prominent on attack".

==== Auckland Debut ====
Following a win over Newton, 14–9 on May 29 Brimble was selected to make his Auckland debut against South Auckland (Waikato). Auckland was playing two matches on the same day with the other Auckland team playing Taranaki with the games taking place on Wednesday, June 9. He was paired with Len Schultz in the five-eighths with his club mate Peter Mahima at halfback. Auckland won the game 26 to 12. He supported Mahima who made a break in the first half and took his pass before putting Schultz over for the opening try. He made a break of his own later in the first half and passed to Gordon Midgley before the ball was spilled a try lost. For Auckland Arthur Kay’s speed and "Brimble’s brilliance and cleverness at shooting through a gap and clever drawing of opponents before delivery of a good pass made them the most impressive inside backs".

===== Manukau 1937 continued =====
Brimble returned to Manukau for a 22–18 loss to Richmond Rovers on June 12. He "was effective in the five eighths line" where he had Rangi Chase outside him who scored three tries. Brimble was said to have done "some clever work". Manukau then traveled to Tāneatua to play the Bay of Plenty and in an entertaining game won 51 to 33 on June 19. Brimble scored a try for Manukau in their 31–11 win over North Shore at Carlaw Park on July 3. He "was nippy in the five eighths line and always ready to go on either side of the scrum". The Herald said that he and Mahima "excelled on attack, and the pair compare favourably with any inside backs in Auckland". While the Auckland Star said he "rose to great heights at times". Manukau had well and truly found form with another win, 20–13 over Marist on July 10 in the main match at Carlaw Park. Their first two tries came from "splendid openings" by Mahima and Brimble in the second half. Brimble had been "closely watched, but he made a few openings in brilliant style". In a 22 to 5 win against Newton the following week Brimble and Mahima gave "attractive exhibitions" along with forward Jack Brodrick, Len Kawe, and Puti Tipene Watene. Also playing well outside Brimble were Rangi Chase at centre and Tommy Chase and second five eighth. Manukau once again won, 18–6 over Ponsonby in their round 11 match and with 4 rounds left were in second behind Richmond. Brimble along with the Chase brothers "in possession and combination gave a lot of speed and colour to the Manukau attack". They then drew 11–11 with Richmond in round 12. Brimble scored his third try of the season. He "defended soundly and ran up to his man before sending the ball along". He scored again the following week against Mount Albert, however Manukau crucially lost 20–19. He "frequently flashed into the picture in clever runs" in the loss. In the last round Manukau suffered defeat once more, 23–20 to City which confined them to fourth of the eight teams. For the third consecutive week Brimble crossed the line for a try. It came after he "cut through the defence, beating several opponents by a clever change of pace".

Manukau now moved into the Roope Rooster knockout competition and were eliminated in round 1, losing to Mount Albert 35–18. Both he and Mahima "were sound, and Brimble, as usual, was quick to sight an opening". They were then placed in the Phelan Shield consolation competition and beat Newton 17–15. Brimble was one of the best Manukau backs along with Joe/Jack Broughton, Chase, and Mahima while Newton were missing Brimble's brother, Wilfred. Manukau lost the Phelan Shield semi-final to North Shore 16–10 on September 18. In early October, Walter, Wilfred, and Ted were all chosen in the 18 player Auckland Māori squad to play Auckland Pākehā, though for all intents and purposes it was the New Zealand Māori side which had beaten Australia months earlier. The backs were trimmed from ten to eight with Walter and Ted both omitted the day before the game. The final side selected saw Wilfred chosen at halfback with Peter Mahima and Noel Bickerton in the five-eighths positions with the Māori side winning 43 to 21.

==== Manukau (1938) ====
The 1938 season was to be the most significant of Brimble's career. He played in 18 matches for Manukau, scoring 4 tries, 2 matches for Auckland, his debut for the North Island, and his debut for New Zealand. He went on their Australian tour and played 8 matches in total. Brimble was named in the Manukau squad for the season which was named in mid March. Manukau won their first match of the year which was against a South Auckland XIII at Waikaraka Park in Onehunga on March 26. They then played Ponsonby on April 2 in a preliminary round match at Carlaw Park, winning 19–11. Brimble, "the outstanding half, opened up the play well…", and he was "often dangerous" along with Mahima.

In a preview of Manukau's Fox Memorial championship round 1 game against Newton it was suggested that Brimble and Broughton in the five-eighths were likely to "make the play fast and open". Manukau suffered a surprising loss, 19 to 8 with Walter's brother Wilfred, playing at halfback, scoring a try and kicked 4 goals for Newton. Their older brother Ted also played well for Newton on attack. It was also mentioned that Walter and Mahima "showed up" for Manukau. The Star commented that Walter "played brightly in the intermediate line". Manukau beat North Shore a week later 26–21 with Brimble scoring one of their 6 tries and was "prominent on attack". They defeated Marist 18–4 in round 3 but "the best was not seen of Brimble and Broughton at five eighths". He scored a try in their next match against Mount Albert on May 7 when they won 17–9. He played "an outstanding game at first five eighth [handling] splendidly and his quickness off the mark gave the players outside him every opportunity. He made several fine openings and was always handy when defensive work was required". The Auckland Star wrote "Walter Brimble, with speed and incisive dash, continually opened the way for Manukau attack…". Manukau had a narrow 18–16 win against Richmond in their next game. Brimble, "although not so conspicuous on attack as usual, showed out for some clever defensive work", and the Auckland Star mentioned that his "constructive play was good".

==== Auckland and North Island selection ====
On May 12 Brimble was named in the Auckland side to play a 'Rest of North Island' side on May 18. He was chosen by Bert Avery, Hec Brisbane, and A. Renwick to play at first five eighth with Wally Tittleton at second five. At halfback was his brother Wilfred. The Herald commenting on his play so far in the season said that "he combines well with Mahima and his speed off the mark often beats the defence. While not so prominent as usual on attack against Richmond, Brimble did great defensive work, his keen sense of anticipation enabling him to save some awkward situations". Brimble and Tittleton were matched up against B. Blackie, and L. McCready both of the Bay of Plenty. The Auckland side routed their opponent 67–14 with Brimble scoring one of their 14 tries. The Herald wrote "all the home backs played well, particularly Brimble (Newton), halfback, and Brimble (Manukau), five eighths. Their combination was a feature of the game, although the opposition was weak".

Both Walter and Wilfred were then selected in the North Island side to play South Island three days later on May 21 at Carlaw Park. He was again partnered with Wally Tittleton with Wilfred at halfback. They were playing opposite N. Kiely and D. Kirk of Greymouth in the five-eighths in what was essentially a trial match to choose the New Zealand side to tour Australia. A curtain raiser was to be played between a Probables side and Possibles side with the former featuring their brother Ted at first five eighth. The North Island scored an easy 55–2 win over the South Island with Walter crossing for a try. It was said "speed from the base of the scrum, due to the fine combination of the Brimble brothers, gave the North backs every opportunity, and deep thrusts were made in the defence". Both brothers were involved in many attacking movements and Walter along with Des Herring and Jack Brodrick inter passed before a try for Jack Satherley to make the score 20–2 early in the second half. Then with the final try "the Brimble brothers cleverly evaded the defence, and Walter Brimble scored for [Jack] Smith to convert".

==== New Zealand selection and Australian Tour ====
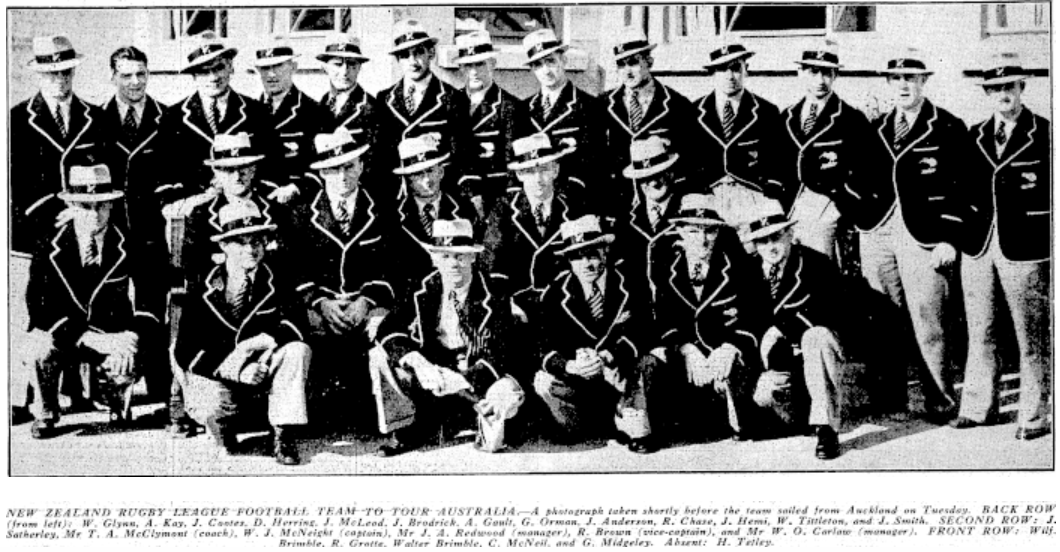
NZ Team 1938

Following the inter-island match Walter Brimble was named in the 22-man New Zealand squad to tour Australia. His brother Wilfred was also selected by Jim Amos, Scottie McClymont, and Hec Brisbane.

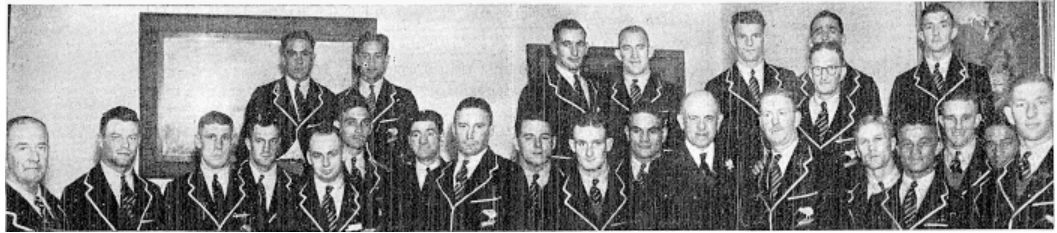
Walter is 4th from the right in the front row.

In short pieces on all the players selected, the Herald wrote "W.P. Brimble (Auckland), five eighths, is 24 years of age and weighs 10st. 7lb. He is a brother of the halfback. Brimble came over from the Manukau Rugby Union Club two years ago and represented Auckland on one occasion [in fact twice]. He has a lot of speed and is very elusive on attack, with a keen sense of anticipation on defence. The brothers should work up an excellent combination with a few more games together".

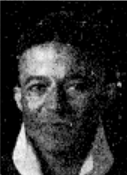
Photograph of Brimble from the New Zealand Herald

Before leaving for Australia, Brimble played one last game for Manukau against City on May 28. Manukau won 23–19 though "Mahima and Brimble did not combine as well as usual and found the opposition very elusive". With the New Zealand side on their way The Courier-Mail (Brisbane) newspaper reported that "the Brimble brothers should shine if the grounds are not too hard". In an article by sports writer L.H. Kearney with short profiles of the New Zealanders he said Walter "was the most brilliant club player in Auckland this season". While a correspondent from Auckland writing in The Referee (newspaper) of Sydney said "outstanding last year, Walter P. Brimble, five eighth, has a lot of speed and is very elusive, with a keen sense of anticipation on defence". The Rugby League News publication produced an article on the Brimble brothers and extended family in their June 25 edition. It said "with four brothers in the front rank among rugby league footballers, the Brimble family has a record in the game second to none in New Zealand. A fifth has represented Auckland at rugby union. This season their success has been crowned by the selection of the two youngsters, Walter and Wilfred, better known as "Riki and Bunny", to represent New Zealand". It went on to say "Walter, Manukau's five-eighth, who has the same small thrust and fleetness in attack, is a genius in making openings.

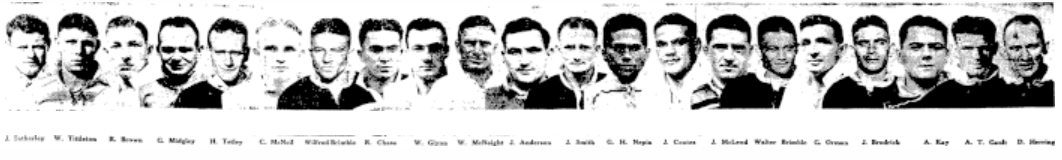
Walter sixth from the right.

A pair of "pocket battleships," in combination they are a power to be reckoned with". Then in some family biographical details they wrote that "the family came originally from Cape Town, but the boys were born in different parts of the world. They had temporary homes in Hawaii, the United States and Australia before settling down in Onehunga about 22 years ago. Walter has a twin brother, Lionel, who played in the same team at school, in the school representatives, and in the lower grades. Lionel's football career was hampered, however by an injured knee".

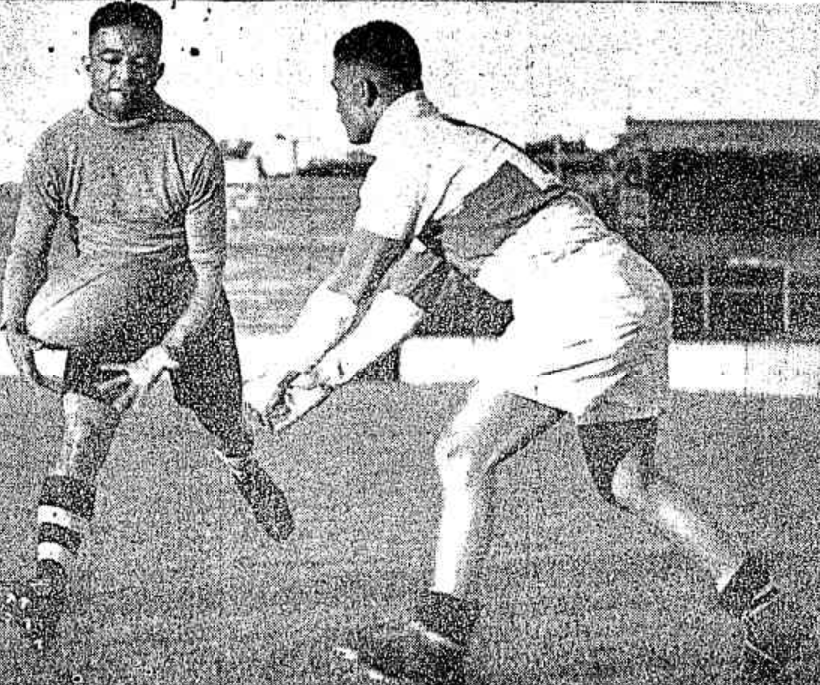
Wilfred passing to Walter at SCG training.

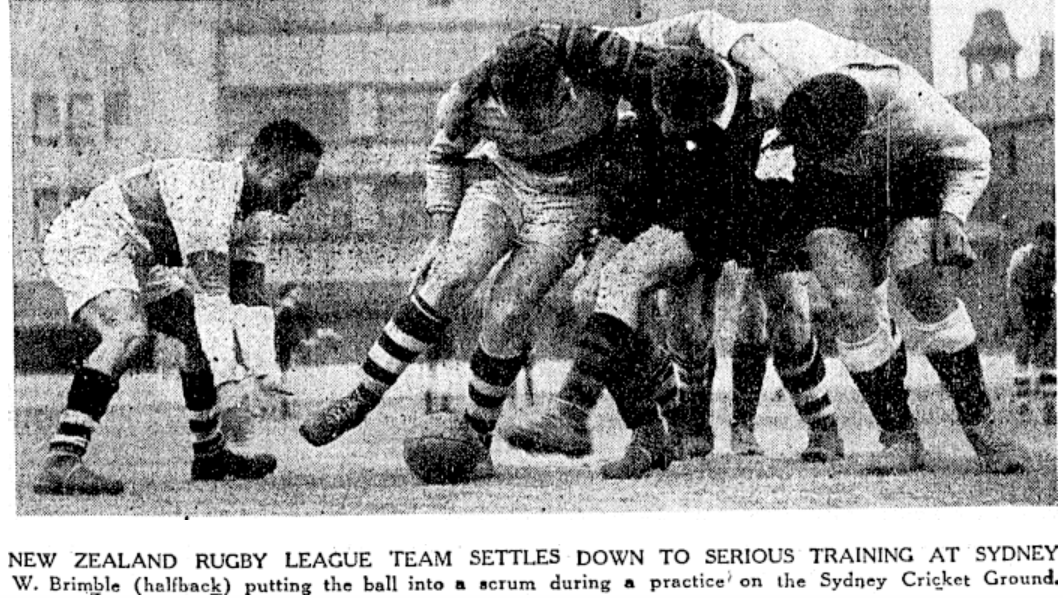
Wilfred Brimble wearing his Newton jersey putting the ball into a scrum at the SCG. Walter is possibly at first five eighth to the right.

Walter was not chosen in New Zealand's first match on June 11 against New South Wales at the Sydney Cricket Ground. New Zealand lost 25 to 12. He was however chosen in their second game against the same opponents at the same venue. He was playing with Wally Tittleton outside him at inside centre and Wilfred at halfback. New Zealand won 37 to 18 before a crowd of 18,426 with Brimble scoring a try on his international debut at five eighth. He was opposed by Toby Kerr at first five eighth for NSW. Walter was said to have been "lively at first five eighth". Early in the game "in a nice New Zealand movement the two Brimbles, Tittleton and [Jack] Smith took play to the New South Wales 25". Nearing halftime Jack Brodrick, Clarry McNeil and Jack McLeod were involved in an attack where "the ball was toed along, but Conlon missed it and Walter Brimble picking it up, went on to score alongside the goal". Then in the second half New South Wales dropped the ball "and Walter Brimble, gathering it, passed to Tittleton, who scored between the posts". The Courier-Mail said that "the two diminutive New Zealand halves, Walter Brimble, five eighth and Wilfred Brimble, half-back played grand football, both in attack and in defence". The Labor Daily described Walter as "the mighty atom". The Referee publication said that the brothers "proved very smart and elusive and the entire back division handled the ball magnificently". They went on to mix the two up naming Walter as the half back and Wilfred as the five eighth. Correcting the names Walter "fitted in splendidly with the three quarters". The Herald speculated that it was "very likely that the combination and speed of the Brimble brothers in the inside positions made a vast difference to the team’s penetration".

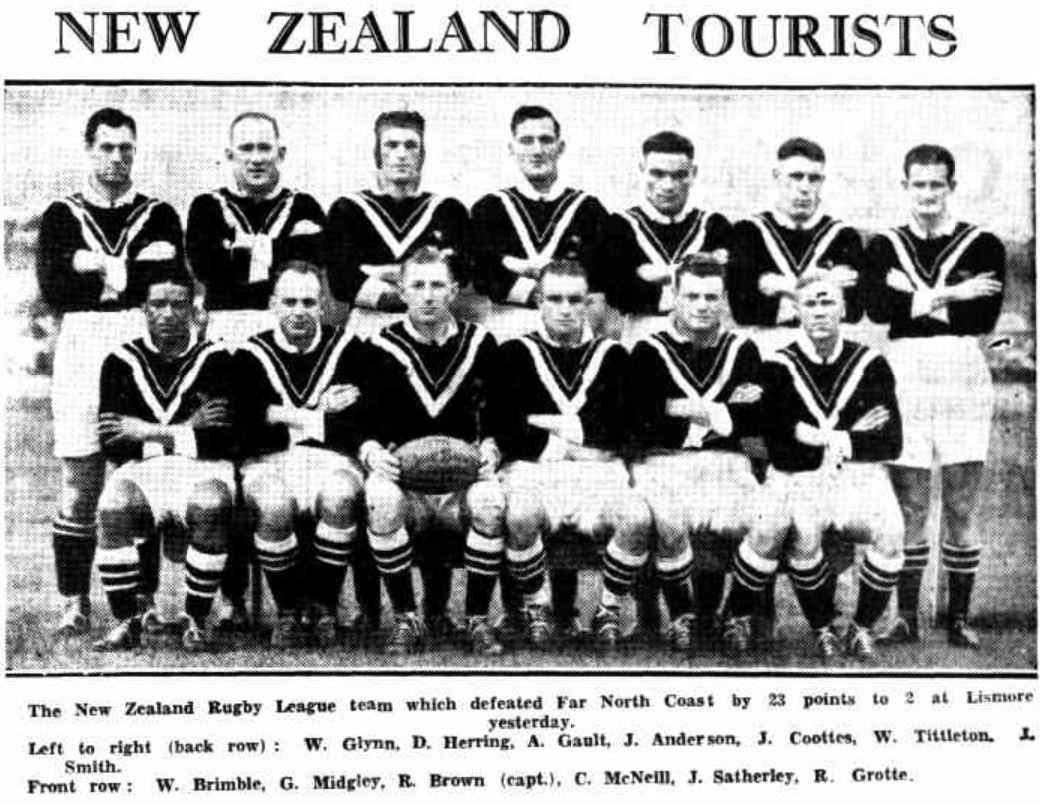

Walter was then named in the New Zealand side to play North Coast on June 15 in Lismore. New Zealand won the match 23–2 with 2,200 spectators watching. It rained during the first half and made the ground greasy with it said that "the play of the New Zealand backs did not inspire confidence, there being a lack of enterprise, while they seldom managed to penetrate the opposing defence". During the second half Brimble "made an opening for the first try, slicing the defence at the 25 yards line, after taking a well timed pass from Gordon Midgley" before scoring under the posts. The Northern Star wrote "Brimble’s display at standoff half for New Zealand was never better than that of a grade player. His passing was badly directed, and his reputation as a defender not enhanced". Both Walter and Wilfred were named in their next match, against Queensland on June 18 at the Brisbane Cricket Ground. Before the game W. Sneyd in the Telegraph wrote that "it won’t be surprising if everybody gets the two Brimbles mixed up, because they are so much alike. They play right at the scrum base, and do they combine!".

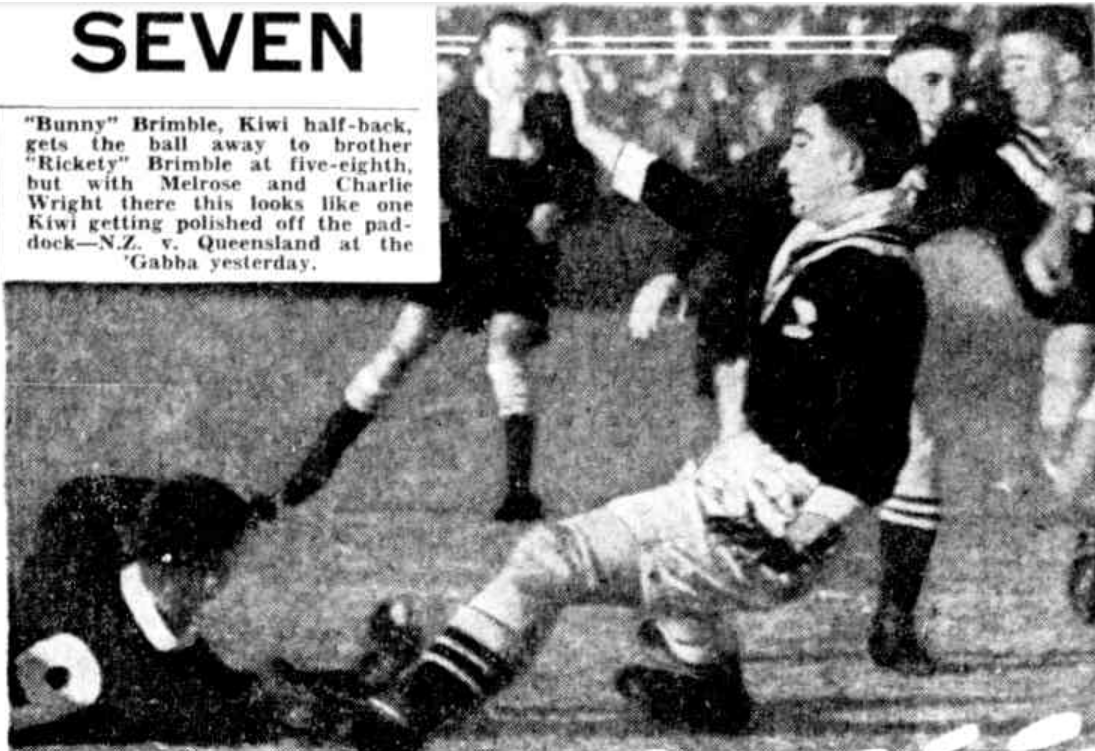
Wilfred passing to Walter in the match v Queensland on June 18.

New Zealand were well beaten by 31 points to 11 before a crowd of 12,000. Walter was marking the Queensland captain Jack Reardon who finished his career playing 21 games for Queensland, 1 for NSW, and 4 tests for Australia. It was said that Wilfred, "the scrum half showed none of the adventurous spirit which marked his second Sydney display, and he broke the hearts of both his forwards and supports by the way he kicked away the limited number of scrummage favours he received". As a result, Walter had very few opportunities with the ball. The Truth newspaper said "the Brimble brothers were a rank disappointment. Half-back "Bunny" and standoff "Rickety" are their noms-de-League and Shakespeare said, "What’s in a name." The same page featured a photograph of Wilfred lying on the ground after having passed to Walter. The Referee newspaper wrote that "it would be unwise to judge the Kiwi backs on this display. Tittleton and [Rangi] Chase in the centre seldom got an even break in attack, due primarily to the inability of five eighth W.P. Brimble to get them on the run, … this Brimble did not shine in attack. Reardon and the Queensland back row forwards made a bird of him, but he, too, had Reardon well held in the moves from the scrum". They went on to say that Wilfred had been sick before the match but "got the passes away crisply and used a short kick through the defence when he found the tackled crowding his brother at five eighth. The tactics were right, though they did not come off through the men outside failing to follow the ball through". New Zealand then moved to Toowoomba to play their 5th game of the tour which was against the local Toowoomba side. New Zealand won 12–11 before a crowd of 2,500 with Walter marked by W. Bligh. Walter played once more at first five eighth with Robert Grotte at halfback. He was involved in one of John Anderson's tries after he received the ball from the scrum and "cut out the opposing five-eighths and centre and ran 40 yds down the centre of the field". It was mentioned that "that was one of the few occasions upon which Brimble did anything else but short-punt the ball". The Telegraph said "Grotte showed more initiative than did [Wilfred] Brimble in Brisbane last Saturday, his chief weakness being a habit of throwing his passes too high to his supports. The five eighth, Brimble made one of two nice openings, and it was his upsetting of the Toowoomba defence that led to play being so close to the line that [John] Anderson was able to clinch the then immediate issue with a try".

Neither brother was selected for the next match on June 25 which was a rematch with Queensland. The local side won 25 to 12 with Wally Tittleton at five eighth and Robert Grotte at halfback. Walter and Wilfred were chosen to play in the following game against NSW Group 4 at Tamworth on June 29. New Zealand won 26–15 before 2,200 spectators. It was said that they were "outstanding" and "the nippiness of the Brimble brothers, working from the base of the scrum… were too much for the Group side" along with the work of Arthur Kay, Gordon Midgley, John Anderson, and Jack Brodrick. Walter and Wilfred "frequently cut holes in the home side's defence".

Walter was then chosen in New Zealand's penultimate match of the tour, against Newcastle on July 2 at the Newcastle Sports Ground. New Zealand won 30 points to 19 with 5,500 spectators present. The Newcastle Morning Herald and Miners' Advocate newspaper erroneously wrote in relation to their ancestry that "the Brimble brothers, who are Maoris, have delighted the crowds by their clever work behind the pack in Australia. Both are fast and difficult to stop". Walter threw the final pass for New Zealand's first try after Jack Hemi had kicked three penalties. It started with "a passing rush, which was led by the five eighth, W. Brimble, who passed the ball to Anderson, who ran over after J Steedall had made a half-hearted attempt to tackle". Walter was involved in New Zealand's last and best try being described as one of the best seen on the ground which saw the crowd cheer for several minutes. It started when Wilfred picked the ball up in his own 25 before passing it to Wally Tittleton who sent it on to Rangi Chase who then returned it to Wilfred before it next went to Walter, it then moved to Anderson, Tittleton again and then to Jack McLeod who scored. The Newcastle hooker (Bert Parsons) outplayed New Zealand's George Orman, winning most of the scrums. The Truth newspaper wrote that "had the Brimble brothers received the opportunities that came the opposition’s way, wingers Jack Smith and Ray Brown would have been seen to better advantage".

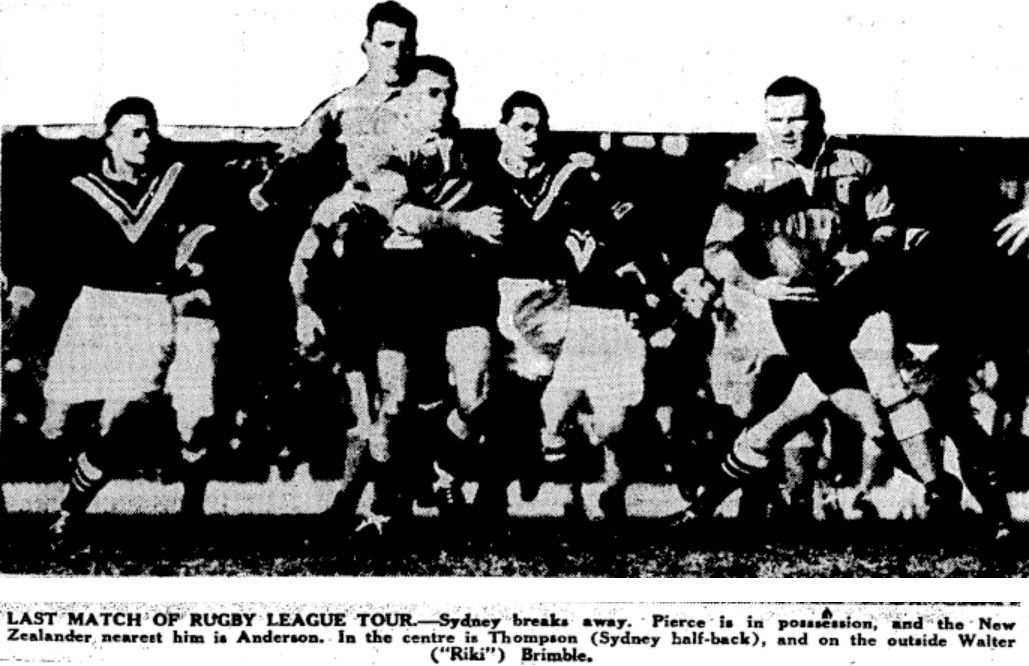
Walter on the left chasing Pierce of Sydney.

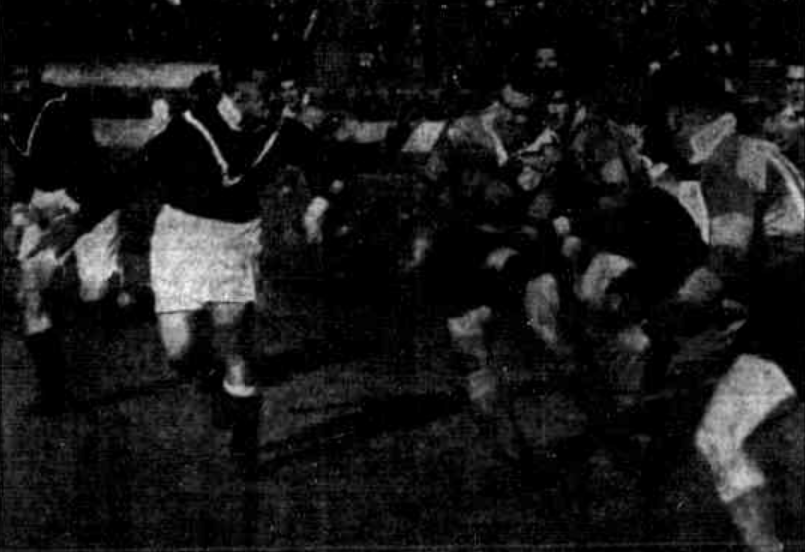
Walter closing in on Pierce.

In comments on the game the Maitland Daily Mercury said that "the Brimble brothers, splendidly supported by the New Zealand lock forward, Anderson, flashed through the centre time after time, and not all the fine defensive play of G Olivera could prevent their progress". They also echoed earlier observations that if they "had received only half the chances the local halves got, the game would have been a procession with Newcastle tailed off" Walter then played in New Zealand's final match of the tour, against Sydney at the Sydney Cricket Ground. The match was drawn 19–19. The newspapers had named "W. Brimble" at halfback with Jack Smith at five eighth though a photograph of Walter appeared in the Labor Daily newspaper so it is more likely that Walter played at five eighth and Smith at halfback. Opposite Walter was Sydney five eighth Cal Lynch. The Referee newspaper in naming the lineups after the game in their match report listed them in those positions.

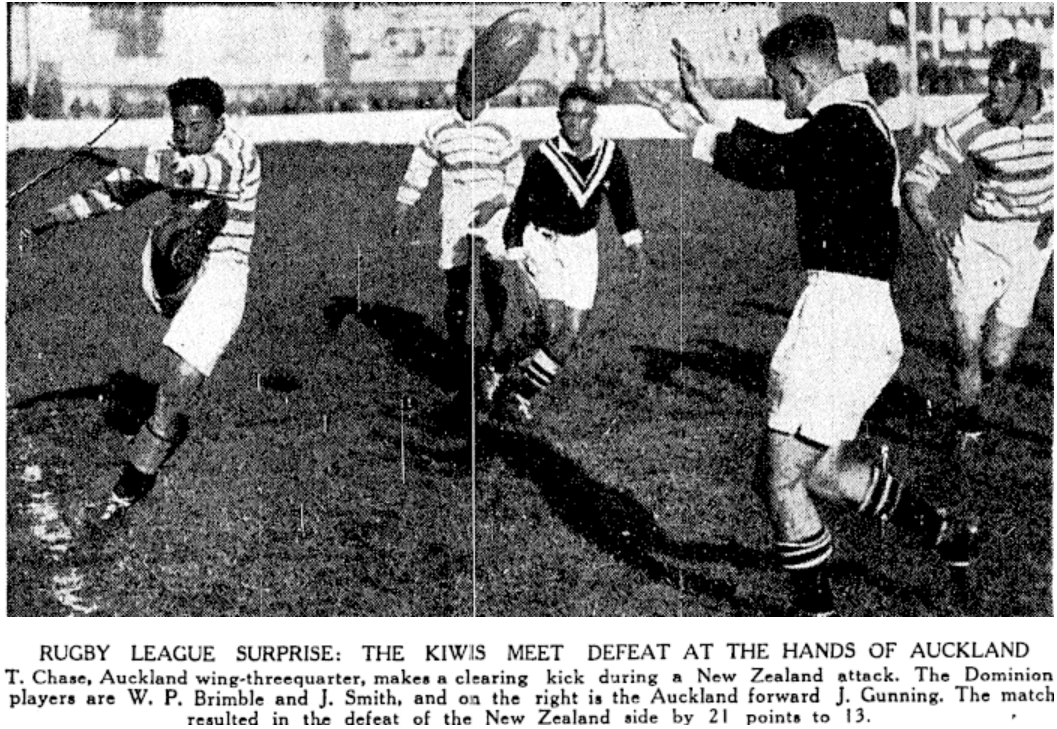
Tommy Chase kicking for Auckland with Walter in the background for New Zealand.

After returning from the tour the New Zealand side played a match against Auckland on July 16. Before a crowd of 15,000 at Carlaw Park on July 16 the Auckland side won 21–13. Walter played at second five-eighth with Wally Tittleton at first five eighth and Wilfred at halfback. The Herald said "neither of the Brimbles… was up to form". When the score was 3–0 to Auckland Smith ran 40 yards before passing to Walter "who cut in nicely, but Tittleton dropped the final pass and a try was lost".

===== Return to Manukau =====
The Fox Memorial championship still had 5 rounds remaining when Brimble returned to his Manukau side. He played in an 18–4 win over City on July 23. In heavy rain the Carlaw Park fields turned into a "quagmire" with Manukau on the No. 2 field. In the second half Brimble "made a fine dash which was well supported by [Mihaka] Panapa" with Freddie McGuire scoring. Brimble was said to have been "prominent on attack" in the match. Manukau then drew with Richmond 6–6 with Brimble "doing some clever work on attack" and "made a couple of characteristic straight breaks through the opposition". In an easy round 16 win over Mount Albert by 31 to 5, Brimble scored two tries. He and Mahima "gave the threequarters every opportunity" with Brimble showing "high-class form, easily the best since his return from Australia. His two tries came from clever individual work". The Herald wrote "Brimble played a brilliant game … and has rarely been seen to better advantage. He showed great speed for 15 yards and always made an extra man on attack".

==== Auckland selection ====
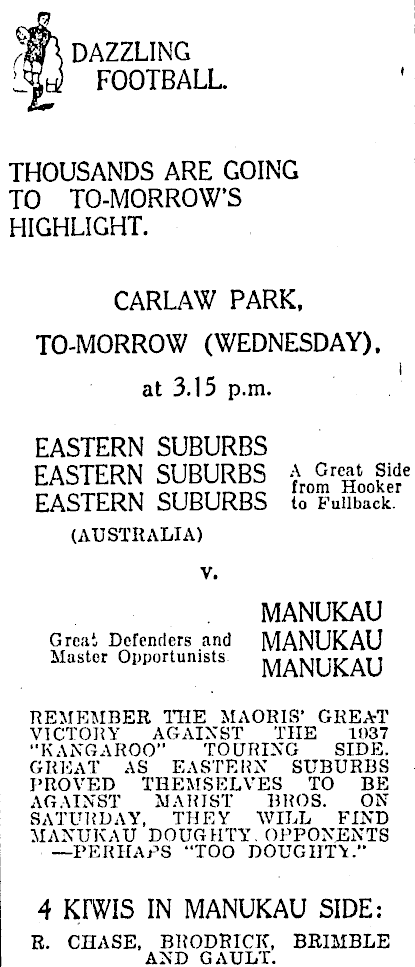
Manukau v Eastern Suburbs advertisement with Brimble's name featured.

Brimble was selected in the Auckland side to play Canterbury on August 13. He was partnered with Wally Tittleton in the halves with Peter Mahima at halfback. Auckland won 28 to 22 though the backs were surprisingly disappointing with Brimble, Tittleton and Rangi Chase not combining as well as expected given they had played together a lot in Australia.

He then returned to the Manukau side for their game with Ponsonby on August 20. It was the final round of the championship and with the 26–14 win they finished 4th out of the nine sides. Brimble was involved in "the best try of the game" after he took a pass from Jack Brodrick with it being handled four times before Brodrick eventually scored in the corner. Manukau then played in a series of Roope Rooster and Phelan Shield knockout games progressing to the final of the Phelan Shield. Prior to this however they had a match with the touring Eastern Suburbs side who had finished runners up in the NSW rugby league competition. Brimble was at five eighth matched opposite L. Pauley. With the score 10–7 to Eastern Suburbs in the second half Rangi Chase made a break but when he passed to Brimble the ball hit the referee and the possible equalising try was lost. Three days later Manukau won the Phelan Shield knockout final beating Papakura 18–8 to finish their season.

==== Manukau (1939) ====
Brimble did not play in Manukau's opening games of the 1939 season in April. He was named in the April 22 side to play Papakura but did not take the field. Mount Albert won easily 38–15 with the Herald reporting that "Brimble, who made a reappearance at first five-eighths, was not up to his best form". In their next match against Richmond, a 15–5 loss "Panapa and Brimble were no match for [Abbie] Graham and [Noel] Bickerton". They both received good ball from Mahima but were "standing flat-footed". In a 21–0 win over City a week later he was paired with Tommy Chase and they both "played good games, especially Brimble whose form was an improvement on that of earlier games". Manukau lost to Newton 16–10 with Brimble scoring one of their two tries. He was playing against his brothers Wilfred and Ted, with Ted opposite him in the Newton five-eighths. Walter was prominent for Manukau while both of his brothers played well in the winning side. Walter and Ted were then chosen in an 18 player Auckland Māori squad by Ernie Asher to play against South Auckland Māori on May 28. There was absolutely no newspaper coverage of the match which was played at Davies Park in Huntly so it is unknown if Brimble played or even what the score was. On King's Birthday (June 5) an Auckland Māori squad was chosen to play Auckland Pākehā at Carlaw Park. It featured both of his brothers but not Walter. In a 10–6 win over Ponsonby he gave good support to Mihaka Panapa.

Manukau had the bye in round 11 and organised a game against Huntly at Waikaraka Park in their home suburb of Onehunga. It was said that Brimble and Panapa "failed to combine well and lost many chances given by the forwards" in Manukau's 9–8 win. In their next match against North Shore on July 1 Brimble went off injured. This was said to have "upset the arrangement of the Manukau backs" and they went on to lose 19–5. Brimble missed selection for the North Island v South Island match and was not even named in the Probables v Possibles trial played as curtain-raiser. He was possibly injured at the time but he was somewhat out of form anyway and was named in the Manukau side to play on July 15 against Mount Albert.

The Auckland Star named Walter in the reserves for the Auckland match against South Auckland (Waikato) on August 5 but later team lists had the lone Brimble in the reserves as Wilfred and he in fact actually started in the game. In a 28–6 loss to Marist on August 12 Brimble and Cyril Wiberg (fullback) "were triers all the way" in a backline that "failed to team well" overall. The Herald said that Brimble and Mahima "were prominent for solid work behind the scrum". In Manukau's final round match Brimble once again played against his brothers in the Newton side with Newton winning 15–2. They both played well while Walter "was quick off the mark and enterprising in the five-eighth line". The loss meant Manukau finished the championship in 5th place from 9. Manukau received a bye in the first round of the Roope Rooster competition before beating Papakura in round 2 by 27 points to 12 with Brimble scoring one of their seven tries. Manukau lost their semi-final to Marist 31–15 and then lost in the semi-finals of the Phelan Shield to Richmond 26–16 on September 16. There were no team lists published and little coverage of the games so it is uncertain if he played or not. With the war having broken out the newspapers focused much more of their space to that with less on sports.

==== Move to Newton and retirement (1940) ====
Walter had seemingly retired, not playing at all in the opening weeks of the 1940 season. However the team list for the Newton match with Mount Albert on May 5 contained "Brimble (3)" in it showing that he had joined brothers Ted and Wilfred in the Newton Rangers senior side. Newton won 8 to 6. The Herald said Wilfred "was versatile behind the scrum, varying his attack nicely in an attempt to find a weakness in the opposing defence. He combined splendidly with W. Brimble and E. Brimble, the trio making many determined efforts to break through with straight running". It was mentioned in July in the Auckland Star that W Tawhai had replaced Brimble as first five eighth for Manukau in the 1940 season as he was playing with his brothers at Newton. However, there was little to no mention of him in any games other than the one against Mount Albert until he came on as a replacement in an August 24 match with City. In the later stages of the season Ted had also stopped playing. In the match with City, which Newton lost 10–3 Brimble (named "Riki", his nickname, in the newspaper) came on to replace Mortimer Stephens, a veteran forward who had spent time in the mid-1930s playing for St Helens and Bradford Northern in England.

At the August 27 meeting of the Auckland Rugby League in 1941 it was raised that Walter had played for Manukau at some recent point despite being a registered player for Newton. It was "discussed at some length, and it was decided that, as Brimble was not a registered member of the Manukau club, he must stand down for a period of 12 months, dating from his last game with Newton". It appears as though he had played his last game as he was not mentioned in connection with the game from this point onwards.

== Personal life ==
In 1935 census records showed that Walter was living on Moana Avenue in the Manukau electorate and working as a labourer. In 1935 he had moved to 23 Mill Street in Onehunga and was living with brother Wilfred. By 1940 he had moved once more and was living at 36 Matipo Street, Onehunga. His name had been drawn from the ballot for war conscription.

On July 19, 1941, he married Elsie Myra Hatfield. She was aged around 22 at the time as she had reportedly been in a car accident in February 1940 in Onehunga while aged 21. She was working at the Onehunga woollen mills at the time. The accident occurred at the intersection of Victoria and Church Streets when their vehicle struck a bus after seven o’clock in the evening. Hatfield was able to go home after treatment but her friend Mrs. Nita Kerr Thompson was in hospital in a serious condition.

In February, 1942 a short piece appeared in the New Zealand Herald regarding Brimble's military service. The piece was titled "Objection to Serving – A Half-Caste Kaffir" and it said: “Stating he did not see why he should be called upon to fight for another race, Walter Pierpont Brimble, a half-caste Kaffir, appealed for exemption from military service on the ground of conscientious objection before the No. 1 Armed Forces Appeal Board yesterday. The reservist said he had lived in New Zealand practically all his life, but he considered the colour bar operated here. The appeal was dismissed”. The Dominion newspaper was a slightly longer piece that included the quotes; "Mr. F.J. Cox (Crown representative): How long have you lived in New Zealand? Reservist: Practically all my life. Mr. Cox: You have enjoyed the amenities of this country? “Such as they are", replied the reservist, who went on to say that the colour bar operated in New Zealand. “Not as bad as in South Africa”. Remarked the chairman, Mr. Orr Walker, S.M. Further questioned, the reservist said he would not fight the Japanese but he would fight an enemy of his race if he was in South Africa. “I can’t say that you are a conscientious objector,” said the chairman in dismissing the appeal”. Census records showed that in 1946 Brimble was still living in the Onehunga area on Matipo Street with his wife Elsie and also his brother Wilfred.

In 1947 Cyril Brimble, one of their older brothers was killed in a fall from a truck in Taitā, Lower Hutt on April 27. He was aged 48. He was found unconscious at the corner of Oxford Terrace, Lower Hutt at 6:30pm on Saturday. He was sitting alone on the bed of the truck and the driver was unaware that he had fallen off. It was mentioned that he was a former rugby league representative of Canterbury and Wellington after having played for Newton in the early 1930s. He was married and had one child.

Walter continued to live in Onehunga in the late 1940s before moving to 251 Point England Road in Point England in the early 1950s. He was working as a wool scourer. On September 18, 1957, his mother Jane Depua Brimble died aged 72. At the time Walter was still living on Point England Road, and was now employed as a welder. A job he had into the 1960s while still living on the same road. In 1968 on June 27 his brother Edward (Ted) Brimble died. He was cremated at Purewa Cemetery in Auckland. By 1969 Walter was still living on Point England Road but was now working as a driver, living with Elsie and their daughter, Sheryl Ann. In 1972, now aged 61 Walter was working as a cleaner and still living with Elsie on Point England Road. He retired in the mid-1970s and remained living in the same house with Elsie with their daughter Sheryl living with them also.

Walter's twin brother Lionel died in 1986. Then 4 years later in 1990 Walter died aged 79.
