= Rangi Chase (rugby league, born 1918) =

New Zealand international rugby league & union player

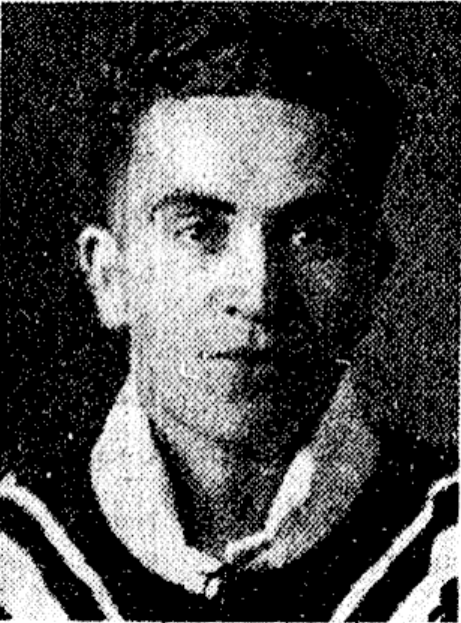

Personal information
- Full name: Rangitāwhana Chase
- Born: 16 November 1918 Moawhango, Whanganui, New Zealand
- Died: 7 September 1998 (aged 79) Moawhango, Whanganui, New Zealand

Playing information
- Height: 5 ft 9 in (1.75 m)
- Weight: 13 st 1 lb (83 kg)

Rugby union
- Position: Fullback, Centre, Second five
Club
Years	Team	Pld	T	G	FG	P
1935–37	Huia	12	8	5	0	34
Representative
Years	Team	Pld	T	G	FG	P
1935–47	Taihape Māori	3	1	2	0	8
1936	Whanganui Māori	1	0	0	0	0
1936–41	Taihape	5	3	0	0	9
1936	Whanganui	3	2	0	0	6
1937	Whanganui Country	1	1	0	0	3
1941	East (Taihape)	2	0	0	0	0
1947	Taihape Māori	1	0	2	0	5

Rugby league
- Position: Centre, Wing
Club
Years	Team	Pld	T	G	FG	P
1937–38	Manukau	17	17	0	1	52
Representative
Years	Team	Pld	T	G	FG	P
1937	NZ Probables	1	3	0	0	9
1937–38	New Zealand	10 (2)	2	0	0	6
1937	New Zealand Māori	1	1	0	0	3
1938	Auckland	2	5	0	0	15
1938	North Island	1	1	0	0	3
1946	Whanganui Māori	1	1	0	0	3
- Relatives: Tommy Chase (brother)

Rangitāwhana Chase (16 November 1918 – 7 September 1998) was a rugby league player. He represented the New Zealand rugby league team in 10 matches from 1937 to 1938. In the process he became the 248th player to represent New Zealand. He also represented New Zealand Māori against Australia, as well as the North Island and Auckland. He played his club rugby league in Auckland for the Manukau side. He also represented Whanganui in rugby union and played for the Huia club, as well as making representative appearances for several sub union sides.

== Early life ==
Rangitāwhana Chase was born on 16 November 1918 to Henare (Harry) Chase (1887–1949), and Erina Tamara Weatherley (1894–1957) in Moawhango, in rural Whanganui. They had several children together. He had a sister, Ngahua o te Maramatanga (Ginny) Chase (1922–2005), born in Taihape, and another sister Peggy Te Miringa Chase Whenuaroa (1925–2002). Another sister, Kewa Ruby Chase was also born around this time with no fixed date of birth. She died in 1977. Henare also had many children to Miriama Te Pirihi Kaihote. Rangi's older half brother Tame Thomas (Tommy) Chase also played representative rugby union for Whanganui and moved to Auckland with Rangi to play rugby league for Manukau in 1938. He also represented New Zealand at rugby league in 1939.

== Playing career ==
=== Whanganui rugby ===
Rangi Chase played his early rugby for the Huia club in the Taihape area, located in the Whanganui province. They were a team dominated by local Māori players. In 1933, aged 14 he played for Huia against Pirates on 17 June and scored a try. In 1998 these two clubs merged to form the Taihape Rugby & Sports Club. In 1934 Chase was selected for the Taihape sub-union representative side for their match with Rangitikei on 11 August whilst still aged 15. The match was played at Mangaweka and Taihape won 14 to 5 with Chase scoring 2 tries. It was reported in the Whanganui Chronicle that Chase had been one of their "best men". With the score at 5–0 he "broke away for Taihape, and with the ball at his toe carried the play into midfield", a while later from a line-out "the ball went to Graham who sent it over to Chase, the latter scoring a try". Soon after he received a pass from Gregory to cross for his second try.

The 1935 season started with Chase still playing in Huia's senior side against Hautapu on 25 May despite still being regarded as a junior and aged just 16. It was reported that "he certainly did not let his side down, as he was very sound at full-back, his fielding and line-kicking being excellent" in an 8–6 win. On the same day in an earlier junior match he played for the Huia junior side and scored a try and kicked a penalty in a 14–9 win over Utiku. The following weekend he played for the seniors once more in a 9–9 draw with Utiku on the number 2 ground at Taihape. It was reported that he (along with Burrell of Utiku) "gave good exhibitions as the last lines of defence, their handling being clear, while [Chase] came to light with some really excellent line kicks". A few weeks later Chase was selected at full back for the Taihape Māori side to play Rangitikei Māori on 3 July for the Whenuaroa Shield. Taihape Māori lost 22–14 with the only mention of Chase as missing a conversion and then missing a chance to force the ball allowing a try to be scored by his opponent. The only mention of Chase in the newspapers over the remainder of the season was a Taihape junior match against Rangitikei juniors on 20 July at Taihape. Chase was selected to play on the wing. Taihape won the match 11–3.

By 1936 Chase was well established in the Huia side and played at fullback in their early season match with Utiki on 16 May. Utiku won 9 to 3, with Rangi's older brother Tommy Chase also playing but he (Tommy) "failed to reveal his true form". On 13 June Rangi scored 2 tries for Huia against Mangaweka at Taihape in a 21–21 loss. His brother Tommy missed some easy conversions but "nevertheless played an excellent game as did also his brother, Rangi Chase, who was outstanding and scored two fine tries". He had another disallowed for a forward pass. His first try came after the backs got "in motion and he made a determined run which carried him over". His second came when "Payne, Raukawa, T. Chase, and R. Chase handled a bright movement culminating in a try for R. Chase" however he failed to convert it and the chance to win the match was missed.

On the morning of 24 June a personal note appeared in the Whanganui Chronicle stating that "Messrs. Tommy and Rangi Chase, J. Raukawa, and Wereta, left Taihape yesterday morning for Waitara to play for the Whanganui Māori rugby team against Taranaki Māori [team] for the Tuera Shield." The Tuera Shield is still played for today after being first played for in 1896. Taranaki Māori won by 18 to 9 at Waitara. On 1 July Chase played for Taihape against Rangitikei. He was at five eighth in the place of Tommy, who was injured in the Whanganui Māori match, and scored 2 tries in a 27–6 win. Rangi "was outstanding, especially on attack, and scored two excellent tries", he "was the star player in the Taihape rearguard and will doubtless retain his place in the Taihape representative team". A week later he scored another try for Huia in a 8–6 win over Old Boys. Chase then played for Taihape at five eighth against Whanganui Metropolitan on 18 July and scored a try once more. The match was for the Pownall Trophy and his brother Tommy was in the three-quarters. Whanganui won the match 34–14 at Spriggens Park to retain the trophy. It was said that of the Taihape backs "Chase was undoubtedly the best. In fact he was the only back showing representative form… he made several tricky openings for Taihape, but lack of support of the right type brought most of them to failure". His try came "as the result of a quick stab-kick and a clever gather in".

=== Whanganui rugby selection ===
Prior to the match between Taihape and Whanganui Metropolitan, Chase had been selected in a 25 player squad for the Whanganui representative side which was asked to "keep fit". His performance in the match which was essentially a trial was good enough for him to be selected at second five eighth for Whanganui's match with Waikato 3 days later on 21 July. Whanganui won 17 to 9 with Chase scoring a try after "strong running by Barton and a flash through by Chase". The Whanganui Chronicle after the match said that "Barton played a sound game at centre, and was the best Whanganui back. Thompson, at first five eight ranked next, with Chase close behind him". They went on the say that "R. Chase was the one star in the [Taihape] maroon backs on Saturday, and the fact that he played so well for a losing team justified the selectors in placing him in the representative side for yesterday's match". Chase then played at five-eighths for Taihape against Rangitikei on 8 August at Hunterville Domain in Rangitikei. Taihape lost 9–0 with Chase said to have been "sound".

Chase was then chosen to make his second appearance for Whanganui against Bush Union at Pahiatua on 12 August. Bush won 9–5 with Chase scoring Whanganui's only try. The weather was poor with it raining hard and a gale-force wind. His try came with ten minutes left in the match on a "well ploughed up" ground. He had begun the game at second five-eighth and was involved in several attacking movements and came close to scoring more than once. During the first half Barton moved into second five and Chase moved out to centre. Late in the match a kick went behind the Bush side and "Chase tore into the opening and made a dive at the ball just as H. Wolland went back to force, the referee awarding the Wanganui centre a try". He was named to play for Taihape against Taumarunui but did not play in the match. Chase was then named in the Whanganui side to play Taranaki at New Plymouth at second five-eighth. Whanganui lost 13–0 but Chase was said to have played well.

Chase was then chosen in the five-eighths with D. Thompson in the Whanganui team to play the touring Australian side on 26 August. The team was supposed to assemble for a practice and team meeting the evening before the game. However Chase "was relegated to the sideline. He failed to muster with the other players for practice prior to the match against the Australians and the "Big Three" stood him down and called on Dave Jones (Kaierau)". He played 2 further matches in the season. The first was for Huia against Ngamatea on 12 September where he scored a try and kicked a conversion in an 11–6 win. His final match was for Taihape Māori against a combined Tokaanu-Rātana Māori side. He scored a try in a 16–5 win where it was said he played well along with his brother Tommy.

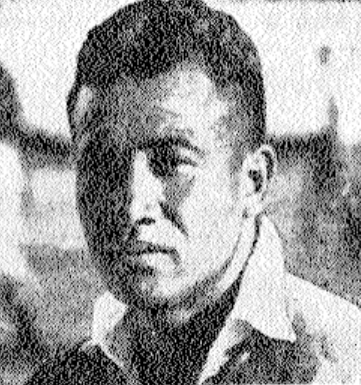
Rangi's older brother Tommy.

In 1937 on 21 April the Whanganui Chronicle wrote a lengthy piece covering the prospects of various sides in the Whanganui for the coming season. They stated "Tommy Chase, the colourful Māori back from Taihape, is to be in the picture again this year. He is training hard, reports state. Rangi Chase, his brother, the boy who showed promise as an inside back, is in the running too. That pair will do much to stimulate Taihape Rugby this year. A week later on 24 April in their opening match Huia beat Hautapu 19 to 18. The Whanganui Chronicle said "Rangi Chase played a brilliant game for the red and blacks and undoubtedly won the match for his side. Hautapu were leading by 18 points to 11 with only a short time to go, but Huia came to light at the finish, thanks to Rangi Chase, and pulled the match out of the fire…". He scored 2 tries, set up another and kicked 2 conversions. His first try came after "a scintillating run… left the opposition standing, and this brilliant player scored under the posts and converted his own try". Then he "once more became the hero of the side when he took a pass from Payne and scored a try in the corner". He had played in the centres and did so again against Utiku on 1 May, scoring another try after he "swerved through the defence to score a great try in the corner" which Tommy converted. Despite this they lost 18–8. On 8 May he kicked a conversion and "went well" in a 13–3 win over Pirates. Chase then played in a midweek match on 12 May to celebrate Coronation Day for the Country team against the Town team. He played well once again and scored a try in a 20–9 win. Three days later Huia beat Hautapu 22 to 0 with it said "this match was a triumph for Rangi and Tommy Chase, who played with perfect understanding and were always a thorn in the side of the opposition. Rangi rose to great heights and played a most prominent part in the Māori team's victory". He was heavily involved in much of the attacking play and "was the hero (or shall we say one of the heroes) of the Huia team, and played brilliantly throughout the match. Accepting a pass from Payne he badly beat the opposition to score under the posts…". He played in two further matches for Huia against Utiku and Pirates on 22 and 29 May respectively.

It was reported on 2 June in the Whanganui Chronicle that the Taihape Rugby Union secretary informed their weekly meeting that "Rangi Chase had received a tempting offer to play League football in Auckland and was considering the matter. Nonetheless he was still selected for the Taihape team to play Wanganui Metropolitan on 5 June for the Pownall Trophy. Taihape were well beaten 16–3 although Chase "put in some good work at times but seemed to be greatly handicapped by the wet ground". Following the match he was named as the back reserve for the Whanganui side to play Manawatu.

== Rugby league ==
=== Manukau Rugby League ===
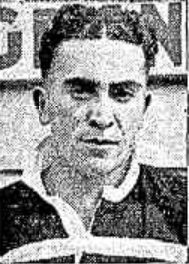

Just days later, on 11 June 1937, Rangi and his older brother Tommy left for Auckland. The Wanganui Chronicle reporting: "Taihape Rugby in general, and the Huia Football Club in particular, have suffered a severe loss in the departure of Tommy and Rangi Chase for Auckland to play league football. These two prominent footballers left on Friday by car for the Queen City. Unsurprisingly it was Tommy, 6 years Rangi's senior, who reportedly took "his brother Rangi with him". They joined the Manukau Rugby League club which played in the Onehunga suburb of Auckland. They debuted for their senior side against Richmond Rovers on 12 June at Carlaw Park in the main match at 3pm. Manukau lost a thrilling game 22–18 with Rangi scoring 3 tries and kicking a drop goal. The Auckland Star reporting that "the particular scintillating star for Manukau was R. Chase second five eighths, who is the most valuable of Manukau's new recruits. He scored eleven of his side's points, and, in addition to being fleet in possession, was sound on defence". The New Zealand Herald said he was "a fine type of player, Chase did some brilliant work on attack, running strongly and straight and showing ability in making an opening. He also defended strongly". One of his tries came when he ran over Frank Furnell, the Richmond fullback with his "weight carrying him over". The brothers had their registration with the Manukau club approved at the ARL board meeting on 16 June. Following their debut appearances for Manukau the Wanganui Chronicle reported "the two Chase brothers, Tommy and Rangi, of the Huia Club (Taihape) have joined the ranks of league and were playing for Manukau last Saturday. Both were prominent, Rangi particularly. He scored several tries … both have played with a touch of sparkle and have contributed a good deal to the spectacular side of rugby in Taihape".

The following weekend on 19 June several of the senior sides embarked on a 'travel round' to various parts of the North Island. Manukau travelled to Taneatua to play the Bay of Plenty. They won an entertaining match 51–33 with Rangi again scoring 3 tries with Tommy scoring twice. The side also included brilliant Māori player, and New Zealand representative, Jack Hemi who scored a try and kicked 9 goals. A match report said that "Hemi and R. Chase played outstanding football. Both initiated fast attacking movements, and their ability to change direction quickly was a feature of the game". In addition to Hemi, the Manukau side also included New Zealand internationals Puti Tipene Watene, Jack Brodrick, and Angus Gault. The Fox Memorial championship then resumed with round 8 matches and Rangi once again found the try line, scoring twice in a 31–11 win over North Shore Albions. The Star reported that "once more it was demonstrated just what an asset the Chase brothers… are to their side… they were continually in the picture and each registered tries. Quick to dart through the gap, they were a continual thorn in the side of the Shore backs. Both were in fine form, but the beautifully built R. Chase was perhaps a trifle more polished than his more stocky brother. Their fine understanding of each other's play was a feature, and the seemed equally at home at second five-eights and centre when they elected frequently to exchange positions". In round 9 Manukau beat Marist Old Boys 20–13 with Chase scoring yet again. He and Tommy "were seen in some good allround work".

Rangi had been playing in the five-eighths with Tommy, but in their 17 July, round 10 match with Newton Rangers he moved into the centres to give Wilson, a Bay of Plenty recruit, a chance in the backline. Nonetheless "R. and T. Chase played fine football on attack, and took part in most of the scoring movements". In the first half they were involved in "good play, from which two tries were scored", the first to Rangi.

On 21 July the Auckland Māori (Tamaki) team played the Waikato Māori side for the Waitangi Shield, however both Rangi and Tommy were not available. On 24 July Manukau beat Ponsonby United 18–6 in the main match at Carlaw Park. Rangi played "a fine game at second five-eighths, and did some great all-round work on attack".

=== New Zealand selection and debut and New Zealand Māori ===
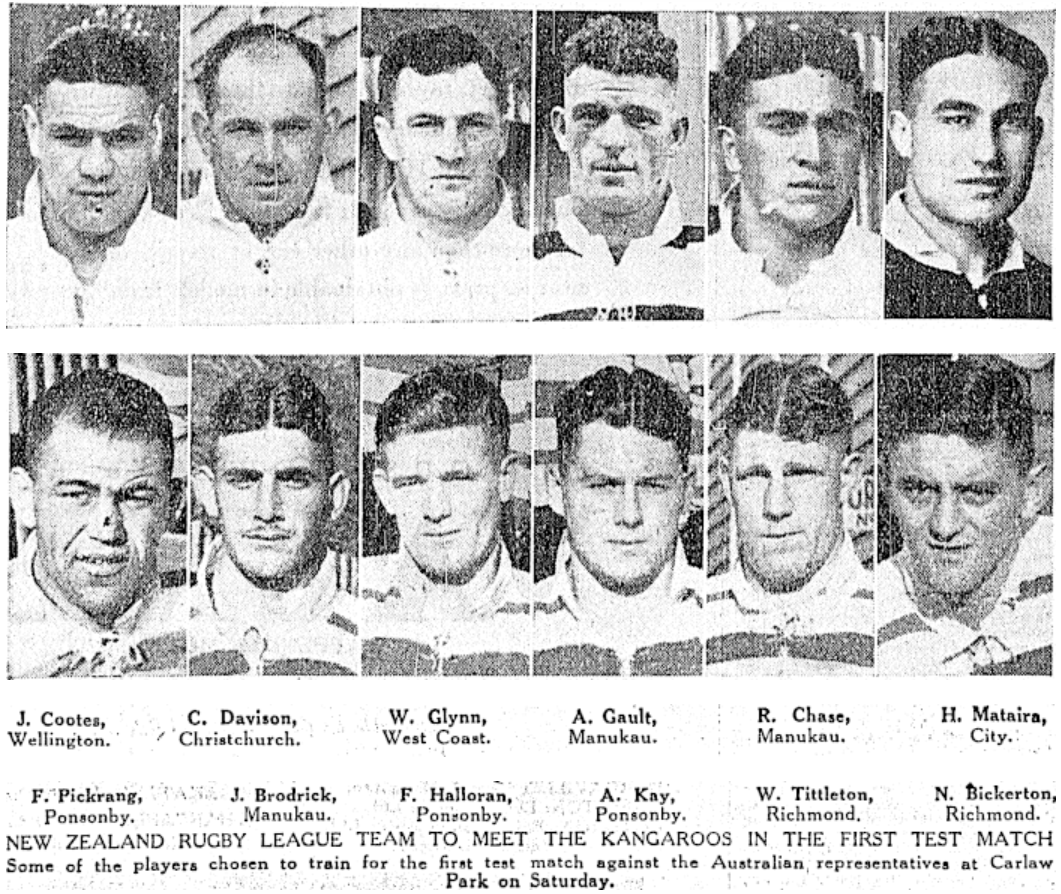
New Zealand profile pictures including Rangi Chase for first test v Australia.

Due to his outstanding form in his short time in the game Rangi and Tommy Chase were both selected in the New Zealand trial between the Probables and Possibles. They were paired in the five eighths for the Probable side. The Auckland Star said that "it will be interesting to see how the Chase brothers compare with the Richmond five-eighths, Bickerton, and W. Tittleton". The Possibles side won in a "quagmire" 25 to 11. The Star said that "Bickerton and W. Tittleton made a better five-eighths line than the Chase brothers, of Manukau, although for sheer solo ability R. Chase was the best scoring back on the ground" with 3 tries. At halftime the Chase brothers were changed over to the Probables side with Rangi making "a good impression". The trial was played midweek and on the Saturday following Rangi was back playing for Manukau against Richmond. Interestingly the brothers were once again paired up against Noel Bickerton and Wally Tittleton in their club side. The match was drawn 11–11. Rangi "did some brilliant work on attack. He cut the defence to ribbons and, after three forwards had handled, Gault got over in a good position". He was "the pick of the backs". He was said to be "the outstanding player… who played a clever attacking game at five-eighths. Many times Chase cut in brilliantly and threw perfect passes to his supports. His splendid all-round play must have impressed the New Zealand selectors, as he is included in the fifteen players to train for the first test on Saturday against the Australians".

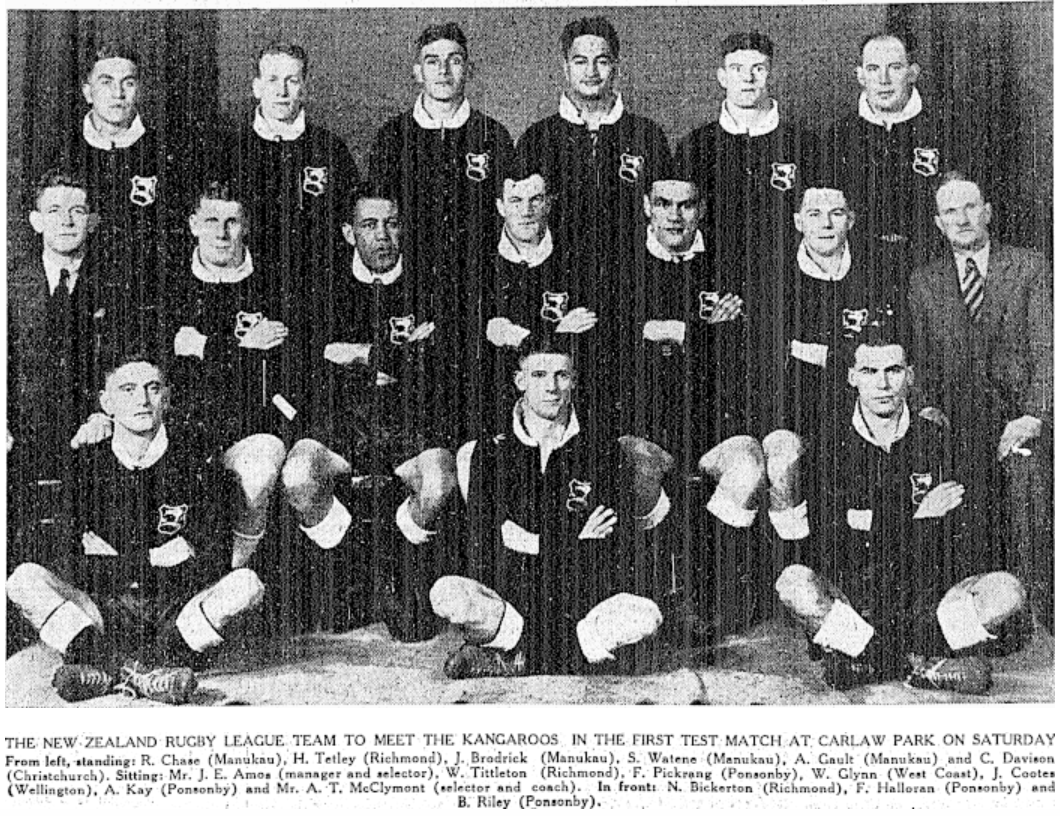
New Zealand team for the first test v Australia. Chase is in the back row on the left.

Rangi was picked by New Zealand selectors Thomas McClymont, Bert Avery, and Jim Amos for the Australia series. The New Zealand Herald speculated that "the form of W. Tittleton has not been good lately, and on the day R. Chase may be the five eighths".

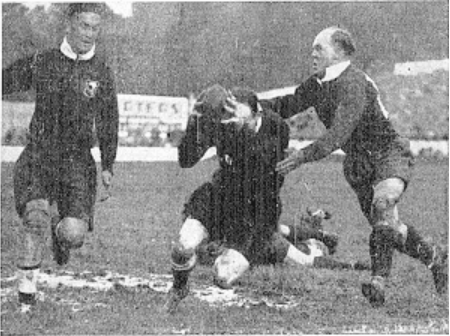
Chase in support of Cec Davison who is scoring for New Zealand in the first test.

There had been 4 three-quarters chosen, Ces Davison, Arthur Kay, Brian Riley, and Chase. The Herald said that "it is difficult to see Riley, who has only played a few club matches, considered before R. Chase. Riley has played most of his football at five eighths, and during the last few weeks he has now shown anything outstanding as a wing for Ponsonby. Chase has had considerable experience and should make a good wing".

Rangi Chase was then selected in the centre position with Puti Tipene Watene at fullback, Ces Davison on one wing, and Brian Riley on the other. The Herald said Chase's inclusion at centre "has not weakened the back line. Chase has shown excellent club form as a clever attacking back. His immediate opponent will be Beaton, an exceptionally fast player, with more than average scoring powers".

The first test was played at Carlaw Park before a crowd of 20,000 and saw Australia run out narrow 12–8 winners after the scores were tied at 6–6 at half time. Chase was involved in the opening try of the match for New Zealand when Davison "transferred to Tittleton, Bickerton, and Chase, and then Bickerton came in again to record the first try after 11 minutes' play". Of Chase after the match it was said that "much of the rugged play fell to R. Chase, whose sound tackling checked McKinnon and Beaton".

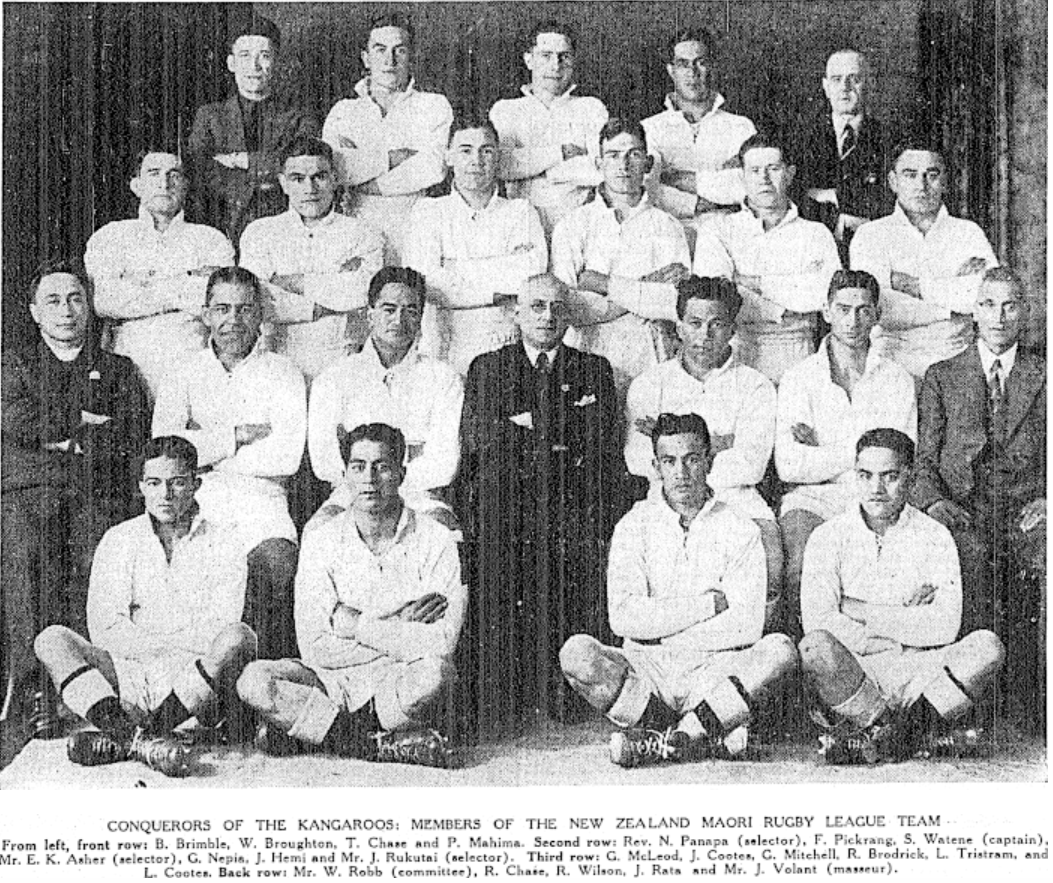
New Zealand Māori team to play Australia. Chase is in the back row, second from left.

Following the test Chase was chosen in the three-quarters of the New Zealand Māori squad to play against Australia on the Wednesday at Carlaw Park. Despite being named in the three-quarters originally Rangi was moved into the five eighths position alongside his brother Tommy, with Mahima at halfback. George Nepia was at fullback with Jack Hemi in the centres. Australia elected to make several changes to their first test side and New Zealand Māori ran out comfortable 16–5 winners despite being hampered by injuries during the match. Rangi Chase scored a try. The New Zealand Herald said that "the two Chase brothers combined nicely behind the scrum, while Broughton and Rata, on the wings, both handicapped by want of the ball, tackled and defended soundly". Chase's try came early in the match after "the home team rushed the ball over the visitors' line and R. Chase scored". Hemi's conversion gave them a 5–0 lead. With the lead at 7–0 the Māori side "had a good chance of scoring but T. Chase knocked it on when his brother had a clear run in".

Chase was going to be replaced by Arthur Kay for the second and final test at Carlaw Park on the following Saturday after recovering from injury. The Herald stated that "the Ponsonby player will need to produce his best form in order to play as well as the Māori centre". However Brian Riley "ricked his ankle" at training and Chase came back into the side. The match was played on 14 August at Carlaw Park before a crowd of 25,000. New Zealand upset the visitors 16–15 after coming back from a 15–6 deficit at halftime. It was the Australians turn to be depleted by injuries and they played much of the match two men short after Pearce broke his leg in the first half and Gibbs went off with a rib injury early in the second half. The Auckland Star said that "much of the New Zealand attacking work was ragged, but Davison and Chase were both impressive when in possession". The Herald said that "Chase made the most of his opportunities, although he had not the pace to get clear". This was to be Chase's final match for the season as he missed Manukau's remaining 4 matches along with Puti Tipene Watene, Jack Broughton, and Jack Hemi. It is possible that he was out of town as many of the Māori players who were not originally from Auckland would often travel home in the off season before returning for the following season.

It was reported in the Auckland Star in March of 1938 that Chase would indeed be back to play for Manukau for the season along with his brother Tommy.

In a decision which was to have major repercussions for his career while he had been in the Whanganui Province, he had evidently applied for reinstatement into the rugby code. His application was received by the Taihape sub union who forwarded it to the New Zealand Rugby Union who approved it. Despite having his application approved he did not play any rugby games and decided to return to Auckland to continue playing for Manukau for the 1939. His decision caught the Taihape Rugby Union by surprise.

He made his first appearance for Manukau in the 1938 season in a round 1 match against Newton Rangers on 9 April. Manukau lost 19–8 and Chase was forced to leave the field early in the first half with a shoulder injury. The Auckland Star, in reporting the injury said that Chase was living at 16, Windsor Road in Parnell at the time. He only missed one match before returning for Manukau on 23 April in their round 3 match with Marist Old Boys which they won 18–4. He was said to have "played soundly" and "a good game at centre" where he "was an ideal link". Against Mount Albert United the following match he "teamed well" with brother Tommy in a 17–9 win. Then against Richmond Rovers a week later he scored two tries and set up another for McGuire in an 18–16 win. He was said to be "in fine form at centre and played an outstanding game". His "adroitness in cutting in … gave him two tries which Manukau badly needed".

Chase was then selected in the Auckland team to play against the Rest of the North Island in a New Zealand trial to look ahead to the selection of the New Zealand team to tour Australia. He was chosen in the centre position by selectors Bert Avery, Hec Brisbane, and A. Renwick, with Clarry McNeil and Brian Riley on the wings and Jack Smith at fullback. The trial was played on 21 May at Carlaw Park and resulted in a 67–14 thrashing by the Auckland side with Chase scoring twice. The Herald said that "Chase played an impressive game at centre, but the test, however was not severe" with the rest of the North Island side being totally outclassed across the field.

Chase then was picked in the North Island team to play the South Island. At Carlaw Park on 21 May the North Island side trounced the South Island 55–2 with Chase involved throughout and he scored a try early in the second half which gave the North a 25–2 lead.

=== New Zealand team to tour Australia ===
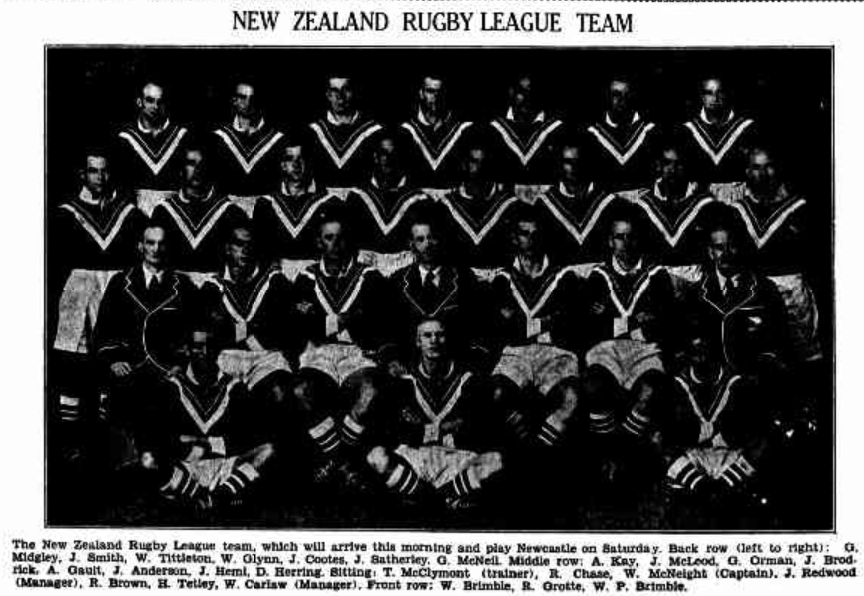

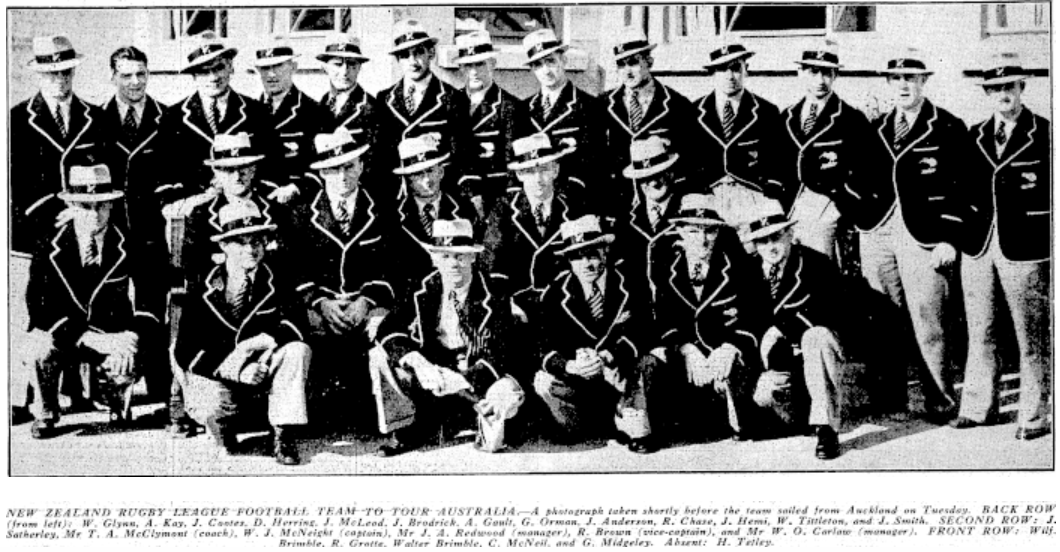
The New Zealand team just prior to its departure.

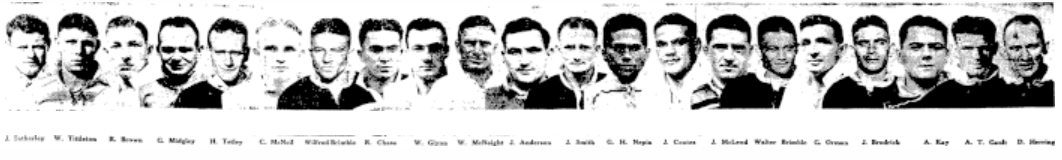
The New Zealand team to tour Australia in 1938. Rangi Chase is eighth from the left.

Following the North Island – South Island match, Chase was chosen in the New Zealand team to tour Australia in June and July. The selectors were Hec Brisbane, Jim Amos, and Thomas McClymont (better known as Scotty McClymont). The Auckland Star said that "Chase and Kay were certain of their places in the centre, the former a smooth-working player". The Herald said they were both "clever players on attack and likely to make good in Sydney".

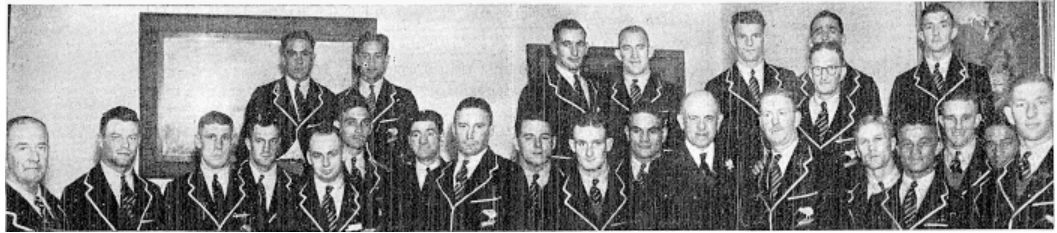
New Zealand team to tour Australia. Chase is in the back on the left next to Jack Hemi.

In profiling the players the Herald's said "R. Chase (Auckland), centre, is 20 years of age and weighs 13st, 1lb. He first learned his football at Taihape and when 17 years of age represented Wanganui Rugby Union. He can play either at five eights or three-quarters, and last year against Australia played a brilliant game on the wing for New Zealand. Chase has pace and initiative, and may develop into the best attacking back in the team".

Prior to the departure for Australia Chase played in one more match for Manukau against City Rovers on 28 May which Manukau won 23–19. Before departing the Auckland Star commented that "W. Tittleton and R. Chase have all the ability to make play for their wings. Chase had a great eye for an opening, and is still improving".

The New Zealand team stayed at the Commercial Hotel in Auckland before departing on 31 May at 4.50pm on board the Niagara. They had earlier attended the funeral of Jack Smith's father, W. Smith. Jack was one of the fullbacks selected for the tour along with Jack Hemi, Chase's Manukau teammate, who had come into the side after George Nepia withdrew for family reasons. The side was farewelled by Sir Ernest Davis, the Mayor of Auckland at a civic farewell at the Auckland Town Hall. Selector Thomas McClymont was accompanying the side as coach.

Chase played in 7 of the 9 tour matches and was in the centres on each occasion.

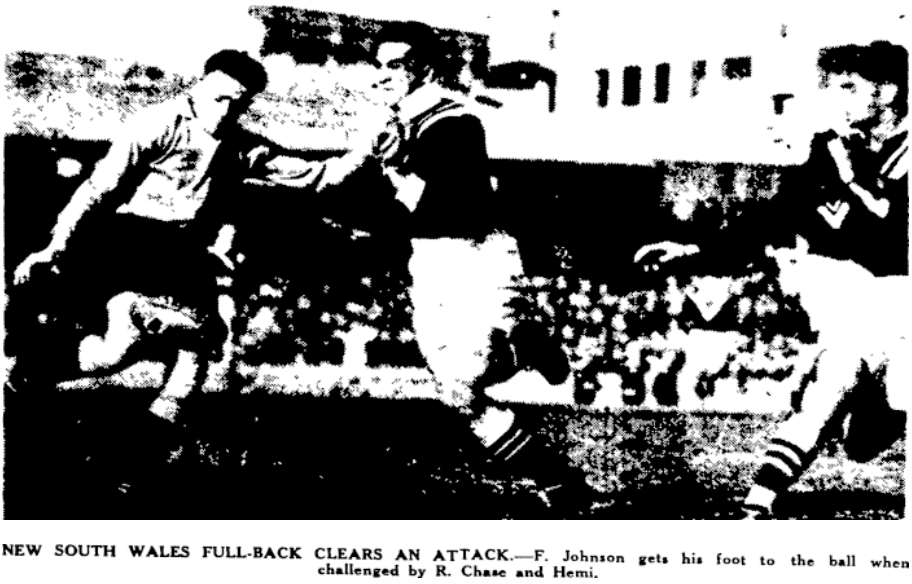
Chase tackling Frank Johnstone in the first match of the tour against NSW at the SCG.

He played in the opening match of the tour against New South Wales at the Sydney Cricket Ground before a crowd of 28,303. New Zealand lost the match 25–12 after leading by 8 points to 3 at halftime.

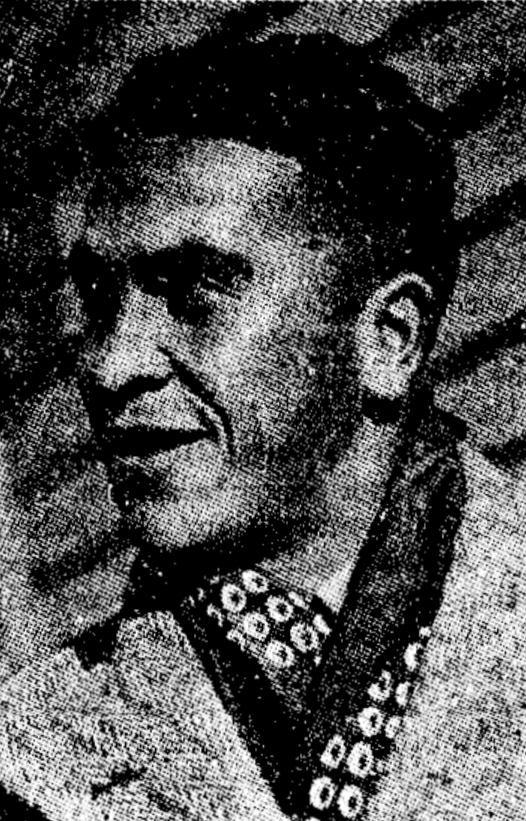
Picture of Chase published on 13 June in the NZ Herald.

They played the same opponent 2 days later on Monday, 13 June at the same venue with 18,426 in attendance. This time New Zealand turned the tables with a comfortable 37–18 win with Chase scoring a try. In the first half he was involved in some attacking play when "in a loose movement McNeight got the ball to Chase, who threw it on to Smith, and the last named scored in the corner" with Hemi's conversion narrowing the score to 8–7 in NSW's favour. A short time later "McNeight and McLeod … dribbled through, and Chase gathering it, beat Conlon to score again", the conversion gave New Zealand 12–8 lead. The Queensland Times reported that "a feature of the game was the excellent tackling of W. Tittleton and R. Chase, the "Kiwi" centres. These two players broke up the New South Wales attack in no uncertain fashion, and gave F. Hyde and R. Roser, the New South Wales centre three-quarters, a torrid time".

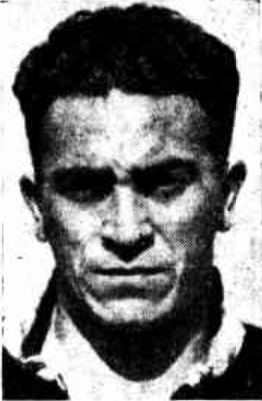
Picture of Chase in the Brisbane Telegraph on 20 June 1938.

Chase was rested from the next match which New Zealand won 23–2 against North Coast on 15 June at Lismore Recreation Ground in Lismore. He played in the fourth tour match against Queensland at the Brisbane Cricket Ground on 18 June. New Zealand was outclassed and lost 31 to 11. Prior to the match the Courier Mail in Brisbane had written of Chase: "The Kiwis possess two grand centres in W. Tittleton (Auckland) and R. Chase, the 20 year old Māori. These players broke up the New South Wales attack on Monday, and gave Hyde and Roser, the New South Wales centres a torrid time. Chase represented rugby union at 17 years of age. He is very versatile, and has played with distinction at standoff half, centre, and wing. He is one of the most dangerous attacking backs in the side". Queensland dominated the scrums and as a result the New Zealand backs received little ball. Wally Tittleton "made a few openings and was backed up by Chase, but lack of support ruined his efforts when tries might have resulted". The Telegraph newspaper in Brisbane said "occasionally we saw flashed of brilliance from Kiwi winger Smith, and Chase in the centre. But their opportunities were so rare that it would be difficult to judge their real ability". The Referee newspaper in Sydney echoed those words saying "Tittleton and Chase in the centre seldom got an even break in attack, due primarily to the inability of five eighth W. P. Brimble to get them on the run". At one stage Chase "slipped a Melrose tackle in the first half to get through the Maroons' defence, but he did not keep the form going".

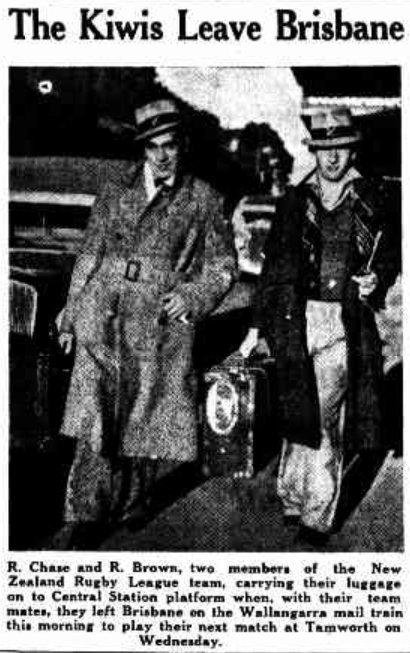

Against Toowoomba Chase was again in the centres though this time he was paired with Jack Smith for the 22 June match. New Zealand won by the narrow margin of 12–11 and did not impress before a crowd of 2,500 at the Athletic Ground. New Zealand then played Queensland once again at the Brisbane Cricket Ground and were defeated 21–12 after leading 12–5 at halftime. Chase partnered Jack Hemi in the centres this time. Hemi had been in magnificent form in the tour but had been played at fullback. After the match Chase was pictured with Ray Brown at Central Station in Brisbane where they were about to depart on the Wallangarra mail train to play Tamworth. Chase was rested from the match with his next appearance against Newcastle on 2 July at the Newcastle Sports Ground before 5,000 spectators. New Zealand played well in a 30–19 win. Their final try had the crowd cheering for "several minutes" with Wilfred Brimble picking the ball up in his own twenty five and passing it "to Tittleton, who passed to Chase. W. Brimble took it again and the ball then went to W. P. Brimble and on to John Anderson, Tittleton and Jack McLeod, for the last-named to score and Hemi to add the goal. It was league football at its best". The final match of the tour was against Sydney at the Sydney Cricket Ground on 6 July. New Zealand trailed 11–5 at halftime before coming back to draw the match 19–19 before a crowd of 5,000. Though they could have won if not for a late Sydney try. In the first half "there was a fine handling burst in which Brimble, Hemi, Kay and Chase took part to carry the game into the home 25. From there New Zealand rushed the ball over the line and McLeod scored a few feet from touch in goal" to give New Zealand a 3–0 lead. The match see-sawed from there with New Zealand attacking when the game ended. Chase had been partnered with yet another centre in the match, playing alongside Arthur Kay

When the New Zealand side returned they played a match against Auckland at Carlaw Park on 16 July. Auckland won the match 21–13 before 15,000 spectators with Chase scoring a try. His brother Tommy played for Auckland and put in a brilliant performance. Rangi Chase himself "disclosed a nice eye for an opening and wonderful ability to take the gap or change the trend of play". In the first half he "made one brilliant cut through … which led to a try". He had received a pass from Arthur Kay before he "turned smartly infield and beat three Auckland backs before he passed to McLeod, who scored between the posts". Chase's try came when Wally Tittleton "raced well into Auckland territory before passing to Kay" and Chase then scored to give New Zealand a 13–3 lead before a big comeback by Auckland turned the result.

Chase then played 5 further matches for Manukau before the season end as well as his first, and only representative match for Auckland. The first of the matches for Manukau was against City Rovers in round 14 of the Fox Memorial championship. Manukau won 18–4. Both the "Chase brothers got few chances, but both played well". Manukau then drew with Richmond Rovers 6–6 on 30 July with Rangi and Tommy both "prominent on defence". Rangi then hit top form in the round 16 win over Mount Albert United by 31 points to 5. The Herald said that "R. Chase was in brilliant form", and that "he was the best back on the ground… at centre three-quarter… he changed direction with ease and used his speed in advantage" and scored 3 of Manukau's 7 tries. In a later article on the match the Herald said that "perfect understanding between [Peter] Mahima and T. Chase gave R. Chase a chance to show his brilliance on attack. The clever manner in which R. Chase stepped inside a tackle made tries look easy, although there was a lot of merit in his three tries".

Chase was then selected for Auckland's only match of the season against Canterbury on 13 August at Carlaw Park. Auckland won a well contested match 28–22 with Chase once again crossing the line for 3 tries. The Auckland Star wrote that "the centre play of R. Chase was attractive, and his forceful method of going for the line when in possession was in keeping with the best traditions of league back play". His first try came after "poor passing by the Canterbury rearguard" to narrow the score to 5–3 to Canterbury. He scored later when brother Tommy "broke through and sent on to [Rangi] who forced his way past Boniface and scored wide out". Jack Hemi's conversion gave Auckland a 13–12 lead. His third try was Auckland's last and extended their lead out to 28–17. It came after Wally Tittleton "made a nice opening" with Chase scoring from it.

Chase then returned to the Manukau side for their final round match against Ponsonby United. Manukau won 26–14 but it only secured them fourth in the 1938 championship behind Marist, Mount Albert, and Newton. Chase scored 2 more tries and it was reported that "a feature of the game was the brilliant play of R. Chase at centre three-quarter…". He was involved in a try to Angus Gault in the first half. A short time later "Chase was again prominent and scored a fine try", then once again he combined with his brother Tommy to set up a try for Pile. Then he "went through the team and Gault scored" once more. The Herald said he was "the best back on the ground… [and] his ability to change direction often beat the Ponsonby defence". The Auckland Star agreed, saying Manukau's "outstanding back on the day was R. Chase, in the centre, who was extremely dangerous in attack". In a season summary in the New Zealand Herald it was said that "a lot of credit must go to J. Hemi and R. Chase, at centre three-quarter, the latter being the most-improved player in the code". Chase did not play in any of Manukau's Roope Rooster or Phelan Shield knockout matches in September. It was reported that he was "out of Auckland".

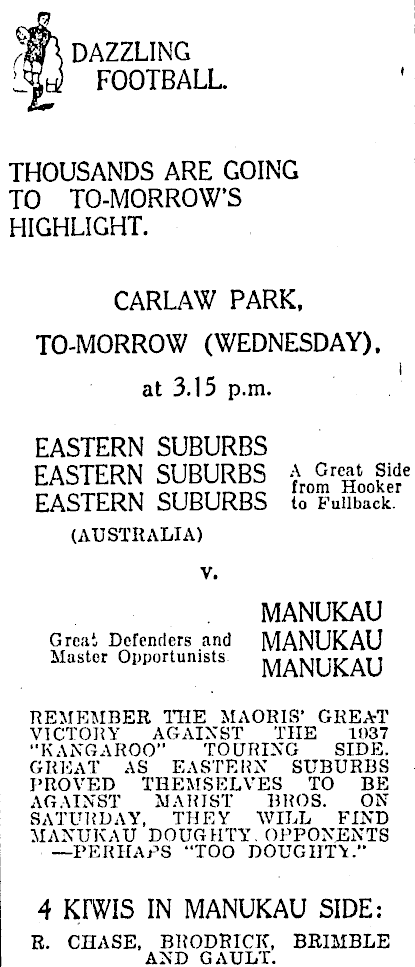
Advertisement for the Manukau - Eastern Suburbs game with Chase's name featured.

He did return however in time for Manukau's match against the visiting Eastern Suburbs team from Sydney. Eastern Suburbs had finished runner up in the NSWRFL competition. Manukau lost the match 16–7 at Carlaw Park on 28 September. Manukau were unfortunate to lose Jack Hemi before the match due to illness, and Jack Brodrick during it to injury. Chase was heavily involved in the attack for the losers but many of the movements he was involved in ended in nothing.

== Attempts to rejoin rugby union ==
=== Quits rugby league and returns to Moawhango ===
It was reported in April 1939 that "Manukau has missed the brilliance of R. Chase, who is expected back in Auckland next Saturday". He did not however return to Auckland. At the end of the season it was mentioned in the Auckland Star that Gregory from Rotorua had "filled the big gap caused by R. Chase dropping out of the game".

=== Application for reinstatement to rugby union ===
On 13 June 1939 it was reported that Chase wished to be reinstated into rugby union. The Wanganui Chronicle stated "Rangi Chase, the well-known New Zealand representative league player wants to be reinstated to rugby according to information which Mr. W. Pine, a member of the Taihape Rugby Union, supplied to the Union at a meeting of the management committee… "Rangi Chase is now a married man living in the Taihape district and he informs me that he wishes to be reinstated, and has no intention of playing league again", Mr. Pine said. "Circumstances have changed since Rangi last applied for reinstatement and then played league. He was a single man then and was persuaded to return to Auckland. He is now married and has given me a definite assurance that he intends to remain in the district and desires to don the rugby jersey again. If Rangi Chase returned to league this season he would be a certainty for the trip to England, but his is emphatic in his assertion that he has no desire to play league against… "will the union consider his supplication" inquired Mr. Pine. The chairman, Mr. J. Webb, pointed out that the matter rested with the Whanganui Rugby Union. If Chase put in his application in writing to the Taihape Union it would be forwarded on to Wanganui, added Mr. Webb. Other members agreed with the views expressed by the chairman, and it was pointed out that Chase would be a great asset to rugby if he was reinstated. It was left to Mr. Pine to advice Chase to put in his application at once so that it could be sent to Whanganui without delay". On 6 July it was reported that his application had been handed in to the Taihape Rugby Union which has forwarded it on to the Wanganui Union. The application was clearly refused because 2 years later in 1941 Chase was once again applying for reinstatement.

It was reported in February 1941 that he and a companion saved two lost girls in the Whakatara Bush. The girls had left home at Moawhango at 6 o'clock on Tuesday (11 February), heading to their home at Turangaarere and spent the night out in the open. They were found on Wednesday afternoon by "Messrs. A. Payne, and Rangi Chase, the well-known rugby league footballer".

In early April 1941 the Whanganui Rugby Union met and decided to forward the name of Chase to the New Zealand Rugby Union once more for reinstatement to the rugby code. The Wanganui Chronicle said he "was now residing permanently at Moawhango". The application "was supported by the Taihape delegates and Mr. A. Takarangi". It was also reported that he had been reinstated once before but returned to league, however he did not actually play a game of rugby union at the time. This was most likely at the end of the 1937 season prior to returning to Manukau for the 1938 season. The New Zealand Rugby Union advised in June "that the application for reinstatement of Rangi Chase (Taihape) had been considered and declined".

It appears however that Chase did play in a few matches in 1941. A match was played on 28 June at the Oval Domain in Taihape between the West and East in the Taihape district. The match was of a charitable nature and not part of a formal union competition. Each side was representing the eastern and western queen candidates in the patriotic carnival. The East side, which Chase was part of won the match 17 to 6. The Wanganui Chronicle reported that "R. Chase showed glimpses" of his old form along with some other experienced players. Then on 5 July he played again for the East against the West in a second patriotic carnival match. The East won once again by 9 points to 6. Chase was listed in amongst the most "outstanding players" for the East team. A further match was played between the East team and a Taihape Town team but it is unknown if Chase played. The on 2 August a Taihape representative side played against the Waiouru Military Camp at Taihape with Chase named in the team in the threequarters. Taihape in maroon, won the match by 8 points to 5 with Chase impressing at times.

In May 1944 it was reported that Chase had once again applied for reinstatement into rugby union with his application received by the Whanganui Rugby Union from the Taihape Union. It was left "in the hands of the chairman to approach the authorities concerned".

=== Wanganui Māori league game ===
It appears once again that Chase's application to play rugby union was turned down as in 1946 he was named to play for Wanganui Māori rugby league team against a Wanganui Pākehā rugby league side. Remarkably he was still only aged 27 but had barely played any rugby or league in 7 years. The match was played at Cooks Garden in Wanganui and was a curtain-raiser to the Wellington – Taranaki match. In the main match Chase's old teammate Jack Hemi was playing for Wellington after moving there not long earlier. Chase was listed in the threequarters for the Māori side along with J. Waitai, and D. Downs. The Māori side wore red and green while the Pakeha side wore blue and white. Chase's Māori side won the match by 11 points to 5. The game was described as a "fast and spectacular" throughout with Chase scoring an unconverted try in the first half.

Then in July 1947 Chase applied yet again for reinstatement into rugby union but was declined again. Later in the year on 20 September Chase did however play for Taihape Māori against Taihape Pākehā. The match was played at the Taihape Recreation Ground with the Pākehā side winning 17 to 11. In the first half chase converted a try, and then kicked a penalty which gave the Māori side an 11–9 lead.

== Personal life ==
Rangi married Mariana Chase (née Iwikau) and they had 8 children, Gary Hiraka Chase (b. 1941), Lyall, Rich, Graeme (Snow), Pop, Teresa, and Bill. Chase's father, Henare (Harry), died on 7 December 1948. At the Taihape sub union meeting in early March of the following year those present stood in silence in respect to his memory. He was noted as "a rugby stalwart, administrator and prominent former player". His aunt, Te Reiti Grace was interviewed in 1983, when aged 91 about her life. Rangi died on September 7, 1998, aged 79 in Moawhango. His wife, Mariana, died in Taihape on 20 December 2011, aged 93.

One of Rangi's great-granddaughters is Silver Fern, Liana Leota (née Barrett-Chase; born 31 October 1984). While his sister, Ginny Thompson née Chase is the great-grandmother of All Black, Damian McKenzie. Rangi's grand-niece, Michele Chase married Paul Stanley and they had a son Chase Stanley who played rugby league for New Zealand and New Zealand Māori while another son, Kyle Stanley played rugby league for Samoa.
