= Wilfred Brimble =

NZ international rugby league footballer

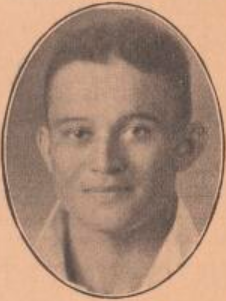

Personal information
- Full name: Wilfred Pierrepont Brimble
- Born: 16 November 1913 Hilo, Hawaii, United States
- Died: 18 September 1999 (aged 85) New Zealand

Playing information
- Weight: 61 kg (134 lb; 9 st 8 lb)
Club
Years	Team	Pld	T	G	FG	P
1935–40	Newton Rangers	97	12	59	0	154
1945	Ponsonby United	2	0	0	0	0
	Total	99	12	59	0	154
Representative
Years	Team	Pld	T	G	FG	P
1939	Auckland	1	0	0	0	0
1938	New Zealand	6	1	0	0	3
1938–1946	New Zealand Māori	2	0	0	0	0
1939	Auckland Māori (Tamaki)	1	0	0	0	0
- Source: As of 30 August 2021
- Relatives: Ted Brimble (brother); Walter Brimble (brother)

Wilfred Pierrepont "Bunny" Brimble (16 November 1913 – 18 September 1999) was a New Zealand rugby league footballer who played in the 1930s. He played for New Zealand.

== Background ==
Brimble was one of seven brothers, who all shared middle name Pierrepont. Two of his other brothers, Edward (better known as Ted) and Walter, also represented New Zealand. Another older brother (Cyril) played rugby at Manukau and also represented Newton Rangers in Auckland rugby league. While their eldest brother John, played for Manukau rugby and spent many years on their committee.

Born in Hilo Hawaii, Brimble had an English father and a Bantu mother Jane Depua Mahdna. The family moved to Onehunga, New Zealand in 1914.

== Playing career ==
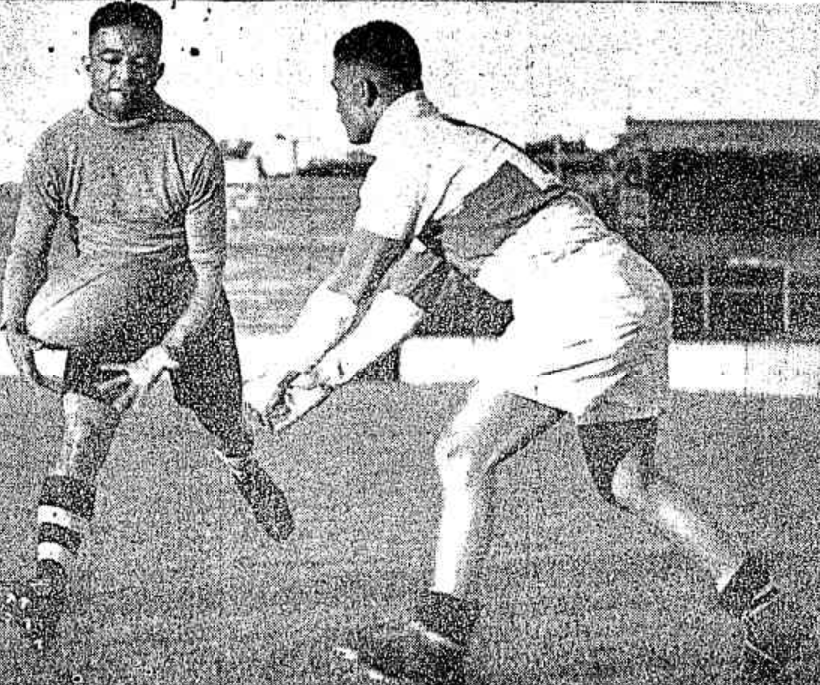
Wilfred passing to brother Walter at NZ training at the SCG in 1938.

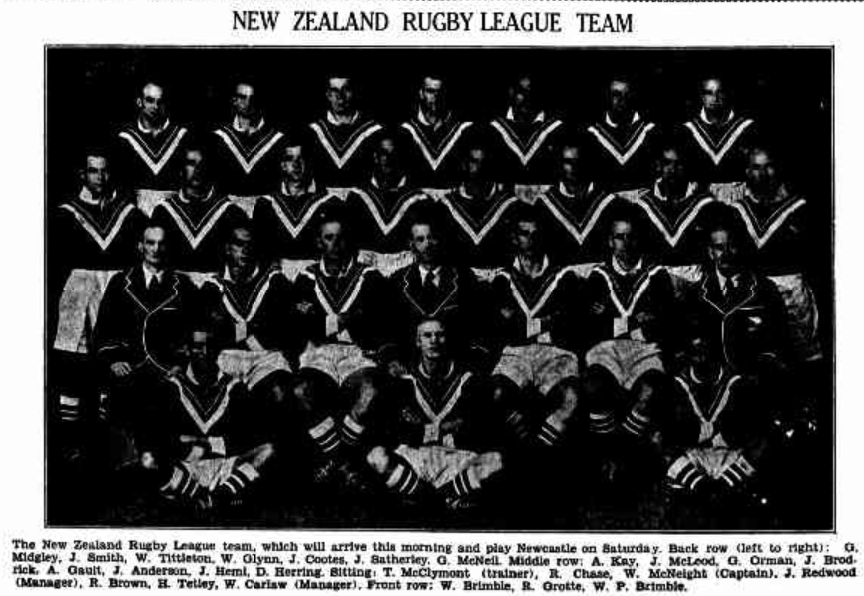
The 1938 NZ team which toured Australia.

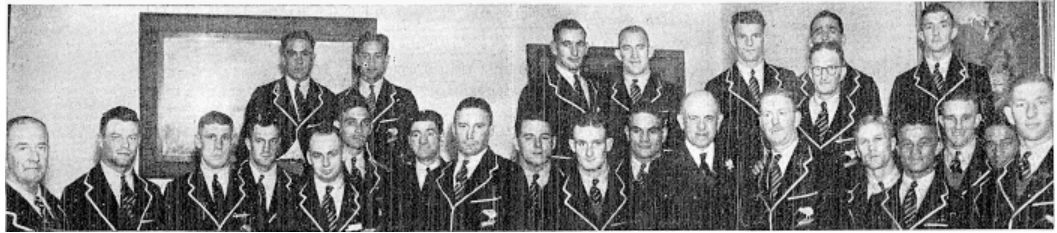

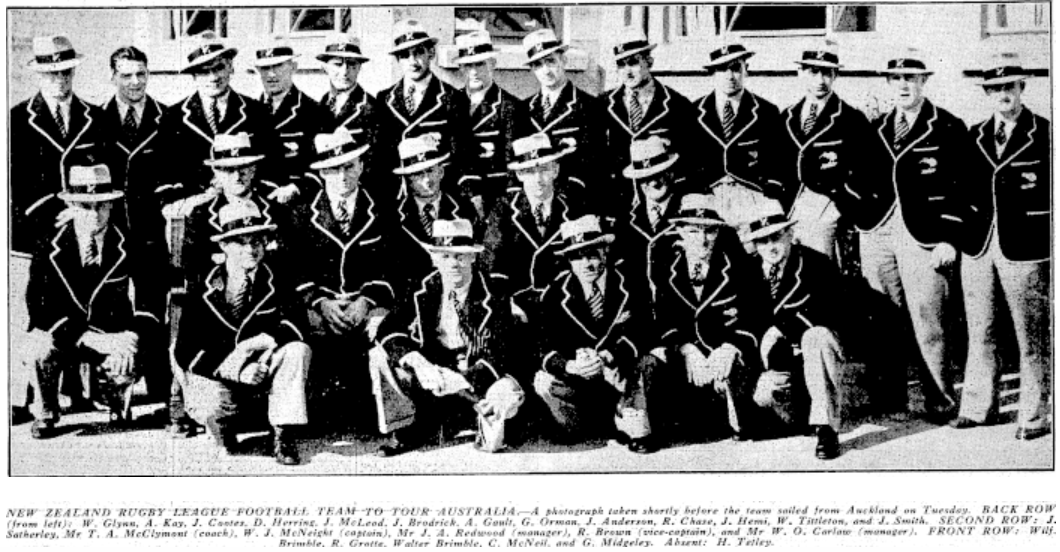

Brimble played for the Newton Rangers club. Despite being of African origin, Brimble was selected for, and played for, the New Zealand Māori side.

Brimble toured Australia with the New Zealand national rugby league team in 1938, however the side played in no test matches.

== Coaching ==
Wilfred coached the St George side in Wellington in 1950.
