= Cyril Pepper =

New Zealand rugby player (1911–1943)

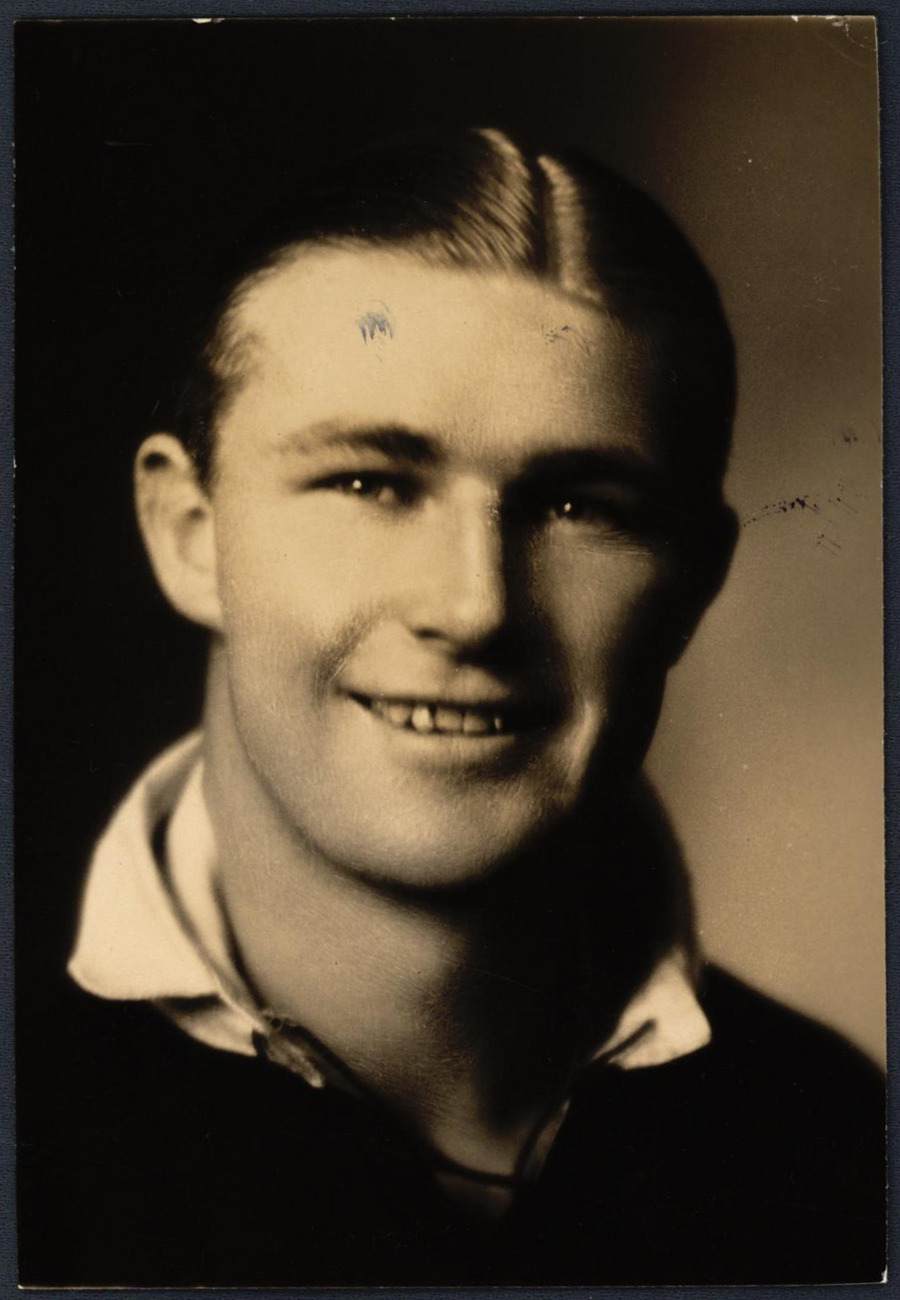
- Pepper in 1935
- Born: Cyril Stennart Pepper; 18 November 1911 Auckland, New Zealand
- Died: 30 May 1943 (aged 31) Wellington, New Zealand
- Height: 1.78 m (5 ft 10 in)
- Weight: 80 kg (180 lb)

Rugby union career
- Position: Prop
International career
| Years | Team | Apps | (Points) |
| 1935–36 | New Zealand | 0 | (0) |

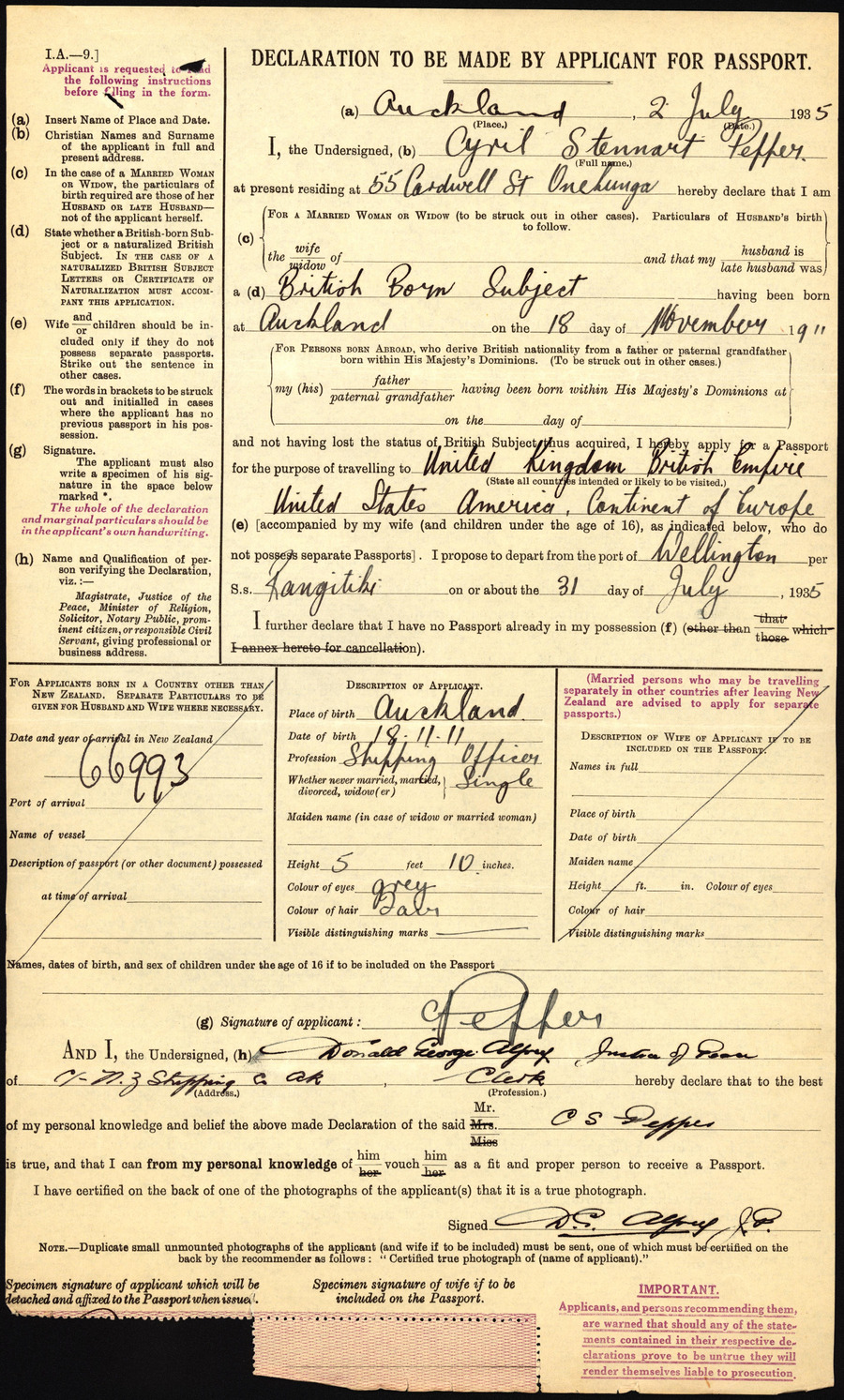
Cyril Stennart Pepper passport application (1935)

Cyril Stennart Pepper (18 November 1911 – 30 May 1943) was a New Zealand rugby union player. A prop, Pepper represented Auckland at a provincial level, and was a member of the New Zealand national side, the All Blacks, from 1935 to 1936. He was part of the squad for the 1935–36 New Zealand rugby union tour of Britain, Ireland and Canada, but never managed a full test cap. He died aged 31, after succumbing to injuries received during the Second World War whilst serving with the New Zealand Artillery.
