= Clarry McNeil =

New Zealand international rugby league player

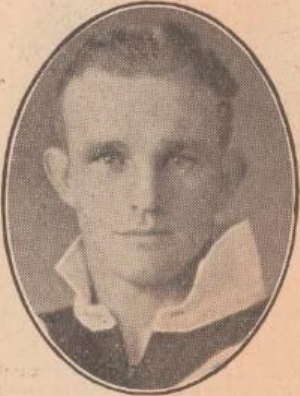

Personal information
- Full name: Clarence Alexander McNeil
- Born: 6 August 1912 Ohinemutu, Rotorua, New Zealand
- Died: 7 September 2001 (aged 89) Coromandel, Waikato, New Zealand

Playing information
- Weight: 11 st 7 lb (73 kg)

Rugby union
- Position: Wing
Club
Years	Team	Pld	T	G	FG	P
1933–34	Netherton Juniors	8	5	0	0	15
1934	Paeroa Juniors	3	0	0	0	0
	Total	11	5	0	0	15
Representative
Years	Team	Pld	T	G	FG	P
1934	Thames Valley Juniors	1	1	0	0	3
1942	Thames Valley	1	0	0	0	0

Rugby league
- Position: Wing, Centre
Club
Years	Team	Pld	T	G	FG	P
1935	Mount Albert United	19	10	0	0	30
1936–37	St George (Well.)	14	14	0	0	42
1937	Randwick (Well.)	7	2	0	0	6
1938–39	Mount Albert United	16	10	0	0	30
	Total	56	36	0	0	108
Representative
Years	Team	Pld	T	G	FG	P
1935	Auckland B	1	2	0	0	3
1936	Wellington trial	2	1	0	0	3
1936	Wellington	2	0	0	0	0
1937	Wellington Country/Hutt Valley	2	0	0	0	0
1938	Auckland	1	3	0	0	9
1938	North Island	1	1	0	0	3
1938	New Zealand	3	1	0	0	3

Clarence Alexander McNeil (6 August 1912 – 7 September 2001) was a rugby league player who represented New Zealand at rugby league in three matches on their 1938 tour of Australia, becoming the 262nd player to represent New Zealand. He also played one match for Auckland, one for the North Island, and two for Wellington. McNeil played his club rugby league for the Mt Albert club in Auckland (34 games), and the St. George (14 games) and Randwick (7 games) clubs in Wellington.

== Early life ==
Clarry McNeil was born on August 6, 1912, in Ohinemutu, Rotorua, in the Bay of Plenty. His parents were Winifred McNeil (née Patton) (1891–1973), and Alexander George McNeil (1884–1918). He had three siblings, Allan Leo McNeil (1913–1984), Albert Louvain McNeil (1915–1986), and Winifred Alice McNeil (1917–1995). Despite being born in Rotorua, he and his family grew up in the Thames area and had a farming background. In mid June 1924 McNeil scored two tries for the newly formed Karangahake Primary Schools Rugby Union's 29–0 win over a makeshift Paeroa Convent side at the Recreation Grounds, Mackaytown. It is unclear where McNeil was living in the 1920s however it appears likely that he had moved to the Ellerslie area in Auckland in the mid-1920s while still in his mid teens. A "Clarence McNeil" was injured in a horse fall on December 31, 1927, at the Ellerslie Racecourse. He was riding Master Doon when the saddle slipped and McNeil injured a leg in the fall.

== Playing career ==
=== Rugby league (Ellerslie), and athletics ===
It seems as though Clarry McNeil began his playing career in Auckland for the Ellerslie United club in 1928 in their 4th grade side while at the age of 16. The following year in June he was selected in a junior rugby match between Hauraki and Wanderers. Presumably he was moving back and forth between Auckland and the Thames area. Then on April 10, 1930, a "C McNeil sustained a broken collar bone" when the horse he was riding (Salamander) fell while going over the steeplechase fences at Ellerslie. It was the second incident that day with the horse after it "came to grief" at a fence at the top of the Ellerslie Racecourse hill. Five weeks later there were two McNeils listed in the Ellerslie rugby league 6th grade B side. In 1931 he was playing for their 5th grade team.

It appears that at some point McNeil had been promoted and played for the first grade side as at the start of the 1932 season the Ellerslie club requested that he and 11 other senior players be allowed to play in the second grade. This had been necessary after their 1931 first grade side was removed from the competition with Auckland Rugby League restructuring the grade to have fewer teams to improve its quality.

On 3 March 1932, McNeil competed in the running events at the Ellerslie Athletic Club's evening sports event. He ran in the same clubs meeting the following weekend at the Ellerslie Domain which was the home of the Ellerslie rugby league club. And again on April 9 at the Ellerslie Reserve. At the end of the season, early in the following summer McNeil again ran in one of the club meetings at the Ellerslie Reserve.

=== Rugby union ===
On May 10 McNeil had his reinstatement application to rugby union approved at the Auckland Rugby Football Union meeting with it then forwarded to the New Zealand Union. Later in the month his reinstatement was granted by the national body.

McNeil seemingly moved back to the Thames area and began playing rugby for the Netherton club. He played for their junior side against a Māori team on August 5.

McNeil began the following 1934 season again playing for the Netherton junior side and in their first game against Old Boys on April 28 he scored a try in a 9–3 win at the Paeroa Domain. A week later on May 5 at the same venue McNeil scored two tries in another 9–3 win over West juniors. He played another match for them against Hikutaia on May 12. In a May 19 match with Old Boys "McNeil made a good run" which resulted in a try to W. Johnson in a win to Netherton. On June 2 he scored two tries in an 11–6 win over West juniors at the Paeroa Domain. He was then selected at wing for the Paeroa junior representative side made up from the Netherton, West, Old Boys and Hikutaia teams. Paeroa won the match 5–0. He played for the Paeroa Junior side again on June 16 against the Hauraki Juniors at Waitakaruru. Paeroa won 22–14.

McNeil was then selected in the Thames Valley junior representative side for their September 1 match against Auckland juniors. The side was selected from the Paeroa, Te Aroha, and Hauraki sub-union teams. Auckland won 12–7. Soon after halftime with Auckland leading 6-0 "McNeil, Thames Valley's winger secured again and scored a pretty solo try". His final game of the season was for Paeroa juniors against Thames at Rhodes Park in Thames on September 15.

=== Return to rugby league (Mt Albert United) ===
McNeil moved back to Auckland and in April applied for reinstatement to rugby league. It was approved in early May. McNeil was joining the Mount Albert United club which was playing in the Fox Memorial Shield first grade competition for the first time. The New Zealand Herald newspaper said that for Mount Albert "one of the wings is McNeil, a powerful runner".

He debuted for Mount Albert in their opening game on April 27 against City Rovers at Carlaw Park on the wing. Also in the side were current or future New Zealand representatives Wilf Hassan, Claude List, Gordon Campbell, and Des Herring. Mount Albert won 13–8 with McNeil scoring one of their tries. The Auckland Star wrote that “McNeil, who hails from the Otahuhu district, is a new winger of the right calibre. He has weight and speed and takes a lot of stopping”. The Ellerslie area was part of the Ōtāhuhu district at the time. The Herald said that “on the wing McNeil showed excellent form and plenty of pace. He is a promising player”. In their next match against Richmond Rovers on May 6 he scored another try in a 27–13 loss. The match was part of the King's Birthday silver jubilee celebrations and drew a crowd of 10,000 at Carlaw Park. It was said that McNeil “improved as the game went on, and was more than a match for his namesake”. This was in reference to Ernest (Ernie) McNeil, the Richmond winger. The following week Mount Albert drew 22–22 with Newton Rangers with McNeil scoring two tries. He “used his pace to good effect when the ball came his way”. On May 25 Mount Albert traveled to the Devonport Domain to play Devonport United (North Shore Albions) and they won 15–11. McNeil “at wing three quarter was always dangerous”. Against Ponsonby United on June 1 he scored another try in a 23–13 win. McNeil reportedly had “all the makings of a star, but needs more coaching”.

In Round 7 on June 8 Mount Albert drew 11–11 with Marist Old Boys with McNeil making “the most of the chances that went his way”. He scored one of their three tries. Bill Schultz played on the other wing for Mount Albert and they both “played dashing football”. He continued his try scoring form with another in a 27–14 win over City in Round 8 on June 15. The match was played at the Onehunga Recreation Reserve.

The following week on June 22 Mount Albert played the main match at Carlaw Park on the day that the new grandstand was opened. They defeated Richmond 5 to 3. Claude List played very well at centre and as a result Bill Schultz and McNeil “were better served than the Richmond flank men”. Of McNeil it was written that he “proved very elusive, and he shows promise of developing into one of the best wings in the code”. While the Herald wrote later in the week that “Mount Albert has a promising wing three-quarter in McNeil, who would score tries with reasonable opportunities. He is an elusive type of player with a strong fend, and several times last Saturday he beat many of the opposition and proved hard to tackle”.

On July 6 Mount Albert had a bye and they traveled to Taupiri to play the local side at Onslow Park. They lost 11–6 to the South Auckland (Waikato) champions with McNeil scoring a try towards the end of the match after their backs broke through and he scored in the corner. In Round 12 of the Fox Memorial competition Mt Albert had another draw, this time 8–8 with Devonport. Wingers McNeil and Schultz were said to be “up to the mark”. In the first half he “cleverly beat [Allan] Seagar and passed to [Des] Herring, but the last-named, who had a clear run in tripped, and a try was lost”. He was “easily the best back on the ground, and with better support would have been the match-winner”. In Round 13 their match with Marist was marred by a lot of fighting with four players sent off in Mount Albert's 18–6 win. Several of the Mount Albert players had moved to the senior side during the season prior and a “bad feeling existed between the teams”. Once again McNeil “on the wing, was easily the best back on the ground, and he often raced through the defence by running straight”. McNeil scored another try in Mount Albert's 17–11 win over Ponsonby in Round 14 on July 27. He “showed pace and sent nice in-passes when pressed” along with his wing partner Bill Schultz.

==== Auckland trial ====
His form was such that he was named as a reserve for Auckland's twin matches with South Auckland (Waikato) and Taranaki on August 3. He was not required to take the field in either game. The following weekend he played for Mount Albert against Richmond in the final of the Fox Memorial Shield championship. The two teams were tied for the lead and the Auckland Rugby League decided that a playoff was necessary to find the champions. Richmond won the match and the title by 14 points to 9. Following the match McNeil was named in the Auckland trial match which was effectively a New Zealand trial match with the impending tour by the Australian side. The North Island v South Island match was being played on the same day as the main match. McNeil was in the 'Auckland B' team to play 'Auckland A' on the wing. The Mount Albert club asked if the Mount Albert players be released so they could travel with the team to Hawke's Bay. However they were told that the trial match was too important and they were to play in it. McNeil's Auckland B team lost 22-19 however he scored two of their five tries. He was involved with Wilfred Brimble and G Rhodes “in several nice movements”. He and his fellow winger Cliff Hall “played with plenty of dash”.

He then returned to his Mount Albert side which won their opening Roope Rooster knockout match 18–15 over rivals Marist. He scored a try in another spiteful encounter. Robert Morrissey was said to have played well for Mount Albert and was “well supported by List and McNeil in the backs” They were knocked out of the competition on August 31 by Richmond who beat them 20–6 with McNeil “nippy” “on the flank”. Mount Albert then beat Devonport 15–11 in the Phelan Shield and lost 11–8 to Ponsonby in the final on September 14. McNeil and Ken Carter supported their centre John Schultz well and were “capable supports”. He played in a friendly match against Taradale on September 21 and his debut season was over, playing 19 games for Mount Albert and scoring ten tries.

=== Transfer to St George (Wellington) in 1936 ===
On March 2 the Mount Albert club held their annual meeting at the King George Hall in Mount Albert. At it McNeil was “thanked for his playing support prior to his departure for Wellington. After arriving in Wellington, McNeil joined the St. George rugby league club. The side contained other players who had recently moved there from Auckland including Dick Moisley, Ivan Wilson, Joe Cootes, and Lyndsay Simons.

McNeil's first game for St. George was against Central on May 9. He played on the wing and with his fellow three quarters, E Gladding and K. Mailman played “well”. The Dominion newspaper said that in St. George's 23–22 win “C McNeil, formerly of Mount Albert, Auckland, showed himself a fast man”. While the Evening Post wrote “C. McNeil, the youthful Auckland winger, made his first appearance for St. George and impressed as being a great scoring man. McNeil obviously, knows what is required of a rugby league winger and does not hesitate to use the centre kick when necessary”.

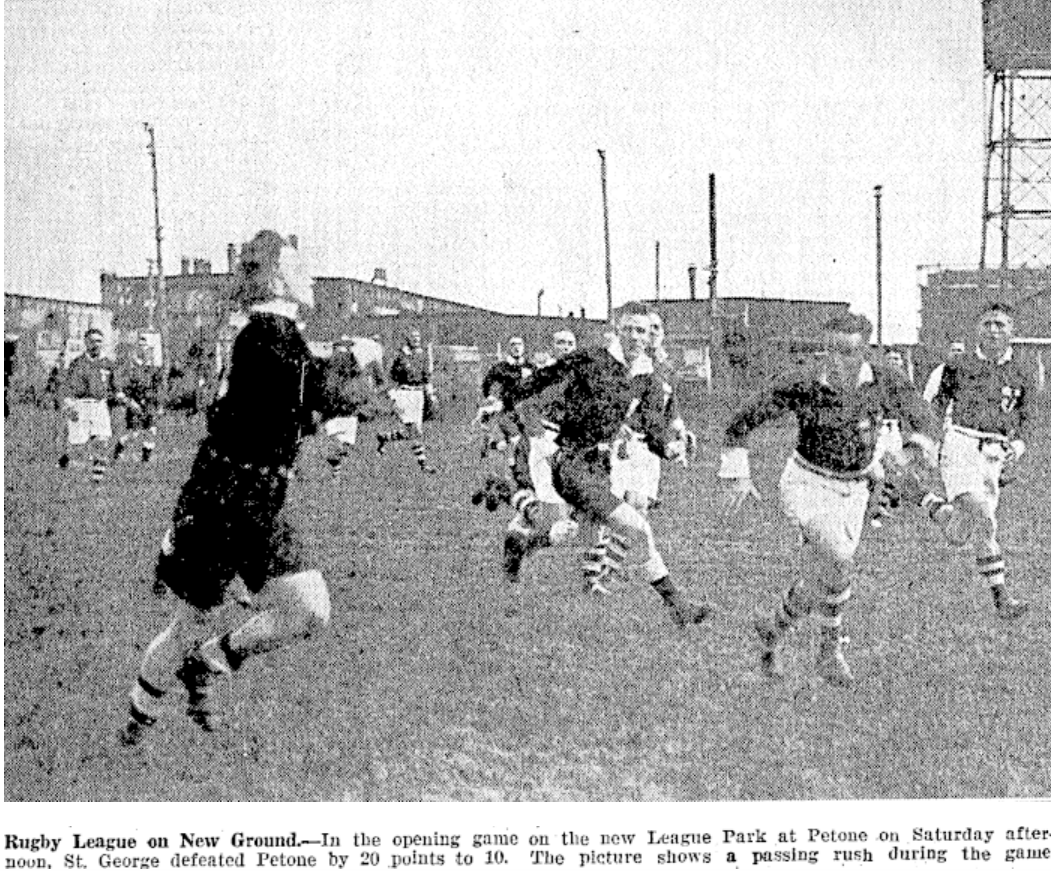
McNeil covering across in defence for St. George in their 20-10 win over Petone.

He played again in their 20–10 win over Petone a week later at Rugby League Park which was opened on the same day. McNeil was “outstanding” but his “opportunities were few”. Then in a match with Hutt on May 23 the Evening Post commented that “Clarrie McNeil was rather subdued but scored a brilliant try from a very cramped position. McNeil’s omission [from the Wellington] players to train borders on the sensational as he was generally accepted as a certainty”. The provincial side was preparing for a match against England who were touring. The following week against Central, McNeil crossed for 3 tries in a 32–5 win. The match was played in the rain and win but “the St. George backs handled remarkably well considering the conditions, and C. McNeil flew into his stride to score three fine tries”.

==== Selection in Wellington representative side ====
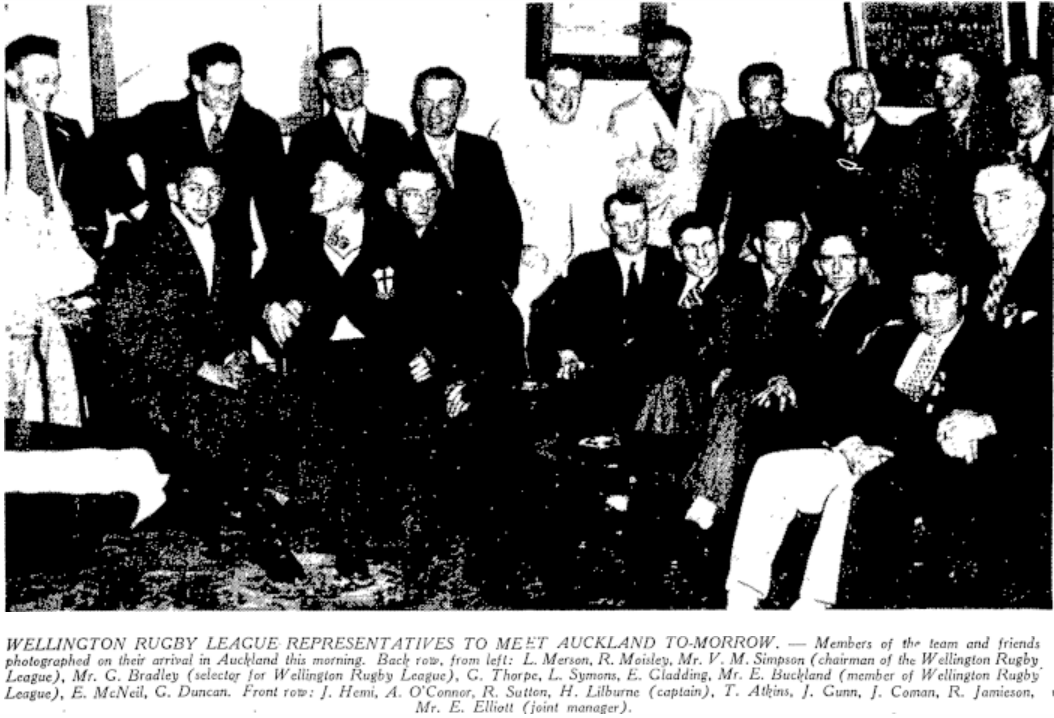
The Wellington side after arriving in Auckland. McNeil is second from the right in the back row.

He scored two more tries in St. George's next game against Petone at Newtown Park. St. George won 29 to 10 with McNeil's tries coming in the second half after the backs sent the ball on to him for the first try and his second came following a break. It was reported that “K. Mailman and C. McNeil, the wingers, figured prominently in the game, the latter in the second half reproducing the sideline dashes of the week before which played him into the players for representative practice”.

McNeil was subsequently named in the Wellington Possibles side to play the Probables in a trial match on June 13 at Newtown Park. The Dominion said “the wing three-quarters pick themselves, as on this season’s form C. McNeil and E. Gladding stand out”. The Possibles side won 24–15. McNeil “looked the best of the backs, till injuries forced his retirement” and he was replaced at halftime. Despite this he was named in the Wellington team to play Auckland on June 23 at Carlaw Park. It was remarked that both he and Gladding had “earned their places as the wingers by consistently good performances in club matches”. McNeil played in one more match for St. George against Hutt on June 20 before Wellington traveled to Auckland for their midweek representative match.

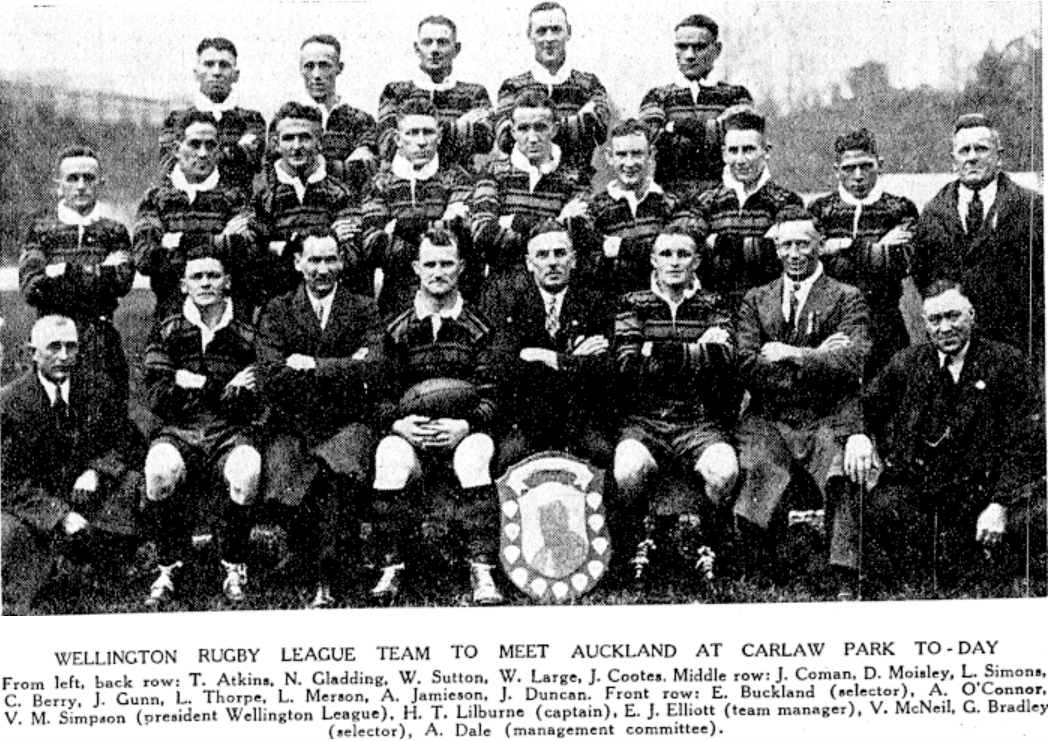
The Wellington side at Carlaw Park. McNeil is in the front row, third from the right.

On the same day Auckland 'Pākehā' was playing against Auckland Māori in the main game at 3pm and as such the Auckland team named to play Wellington was more of a B team with 14 players in the 3pm game current or future New Zealand internationals. The Auckland team faced by Wellington was still strong however with 5 current or former New Zealand players including Ross Jones, Tommy Trevarthan, Frank Halloran, Jack Satherley, and Angus Gault. Wellington lost the game 25–22. After trailing 11–3 at halftime they came back somewhat and early in the second half “nice passing by Atkins and McNeil drove Auckland back” down the field which eventually led to Dick Moisley scoring for Wellington. McNeil then returned to his St. George side in Wellington and 4 days later scored 2 tries in a 36–0 win over Central. He scored again in a 24–13 win over Petone on July 4 and St. George now had an unassailable lead in the championship. St. George suffered their only loss of the championship a week later when they were defeated by Hutt 18 to 6 at Randwick School.

==== Wellington v England ====
With a view to choosing the Wellington side to play England the Wellington Rugby League organised another trial match to be played on July 18 between Possible and Probable sides. McNeil was chosen on the wing and scored a try in the Possibles 36–15 win. After the match the selectors (George Bradley, Lawrence Bensemann, and Ernie Buckland chose 18 players to train for Wellington in preparation to meet the tourists. McNeil was selected as one of the nine backs. McNeil was ultimately selected in the starting side to play. The Evening Post said that “Atkins, Merson, and McNeil are good enough to take advantage of whatever chances come their way. All are speedy and vary their play well”.

McNeil was named on the right wing, opposite Barney Hudson, the Salford winger of nine years to that point, going on to play for them across 19 seasons as well as 35 matches for England and Great Britain. The match was played at the Basin Reserve in Wellington and saw the England side win easily by 48 points to 8. McNeil was involved in “the best Wellington movement of the afternoon” when he initiated a passing movement which saw J. Swanberg, H. Todd, and Joe Cootes take play on to the English team's line. It came after an English player dropped a pass near halfway and the ball “was snapped up by McNeil, the home winger, who quickly broke away. Veering infield the movement was carried on by G Swanberg, S Atkins, and Cootes, the latter just failing to score”. The Evening Post carried on to say that “McNeil and Gladding… had little to do except defend” with McNeil “keeping the giant Hudson down to one try only”. Hudson in fact scored three tries though the newspaper was perhaps implying that only one of them involved McNeil's wing.

Somewhat unusually the same Wellington based newspaper wrote in another article on the same day that “McNeil has not displayed the form expected of him, and although scoring numerous tries he has failed to produce the form displayed when playing in Auckland”. The August 1 games were postponed due to poor weather and McNeil's next game came against Hutt on August 8. He scored a try in their 34-12 Board of Control Cup win. In comments about the St. George teams successful season it was noted that McNeil along with T. Timmins, E. Gladding, and K. Mailman “make a fast attacking three-quarter line”. A week later on August 8, McNeil scored four tries in a heavy 47–10 defeat of Petone at Newtown Park. The match was the final of the Board of Control Cup which saw St. George add another trophy.

With the season coming to a conclusion a short knockout competition was played. St. George beat Central 22–7 at Newtown Park to advance to the final. McNeil's final game of the season came in the final match with Petone on August 29. St. George hung on for an 11–10 win in driving rain to claim their third trophy of the club season. McNeil was in fact selected in a St. George side to play a Combined Team in an exhibition match at Otaki on September 5. But he ultimately did not travel with the team.

=== 1937 Move to Randwick (Wellington) ===
At the beginning of the 1937 season McNeil applied for reinstatement to rugby union. The New Zealand Rugby Union referred it back to the Wellington Rugby Union because their records showed that a player of the name “C.A. McNeil” had previously applied for reinstatement. This was of course referring to 1933 when McNeil went back to rugby union after his time with Ellerslie United before returning once more to rugby league. Typically the rugby union would allow players to be reinstate once but frowned upon players coming and going. The application was obviously denied as McNeil then joined the Randwick rugby league club. The club had been formed in 1930 but had not been in the senior grade in 1936, however was entering a senior team in 1937. He made his debut for them on June 5 against Central in a 12–10 win in wet conditions at Newtown Park. With it reported that “McNeil and Jones, of Randwick, were among those responsible for their team’s success”. The Evening Post wrote “C. McNeil, who played on the wing for St. George last season, appeared with Randwick. His form was ahead of anything shown previously, and more in keeping with the reputation he enjoyed in Auckland. Exceptionally fast, McNeil runs with great determination, and uses an effective fend”. After just the one appearance McNeil was selected in the Country side to play Town midweek on June 9 as part of the King's Birthday celebrations. The Country side was made from Randwick and Petone players while the Town side was from the St. George, Newtown, and Central clubs. Town won the game at Newtown Park by 34 points to 25. McNeil was amongst 12 players named as having “showed up prominently”. Days later he played in Randwick's 11–8 loss to his old St. George side.

On June 19 the Ponsonby side from Auckland was coming to Wellington to play St. George and as it was an exhibition match McNeil was selected to play for his old side. Several Auckland club sides were traveling around the North Island for games on the same weekend. The match was drawn 20–20 with McNeil scoring one of St. George's 6 tries, with none converted. McNeil was playing opposite New Zealand international Arthur Kay on the wing. Early in the game “McNeil was nearly over, being tackled a yard from the line by the Ponsonby fullback [P. Rush]”. St. George were dominating and led 12-0 when “McNeil made St. George’s tally 15 when he side-tracked three or four would be tacklers” and dived “through a wide gap and over the line”.

Returning to his new Randwick side McNeil scored two tries in an 18–13 loss to Petone on July 3 in Hutt Valley. Both of his tries came in the first half with the first seeing “a pretty piece of passing by the Randwick backs [ending] in McNeil scoring in the corner”... “Randwick backs were throwing the ball about with abandon, and it was not long before McNeil was over for his second try”. The Evening Post wrote that “McNeil appears to be playing in his best form and the Randwick winger is a difficult man to stop. McNeil is a strong runner and makes good use of his hips, and has a powerful fend. A tendency to get out of position is McNeil’s chief fault”. In a 17–11 loss to Central on July 10 “McNeil, Randwick’s speed merchant, was always a thorn in their [Central’s] side. He showed a very deceptive swerve in scoring his try”. He played in further matches against Petone on July 24 and Central on July 31. Then on August 21 McNeil played in the unaccustomed position of five eighth. Randwick lost 24-18 and “although he found gaps in the defence, he lost touch with his supports. McNeil is a dashing and determined runner, but is more at home in the wing position”.

McNeil's final game in Wellington was for Hutt Valley which was made up of Randwick and Petone players and therefore essentially the same as the Country team in he played in earlier however their opponents this time was the Addington club from Christchurch who were the Canterbury champions. The match was played at Randwick School on August 27. Addington won the game 25–10 with “the Valley wingers, W. Scorringe and C. McNeil in good form. McNeil was outstanding on attack and defence. He was the best player on the ground”. In a later article about the game the Evening Post said that McNeil, “Randwick’s left winger, was the outstanding player in the Addington-Hutt Valley game, his speed, determination, and unorthodox style of attack being one of the features of the match”.

=== Return to Auckland (Mount Albert) 1938 ===
In early May of 1938 McNeil was granted a clearance to play in the Auckland Rugby League competition where he had moved back to. He rejoined his old Mount Albert United club. His first match for them in two and a half years was against Richmond Rovers on April 2 in a preliminary round game at Carlaw Park. He scored two tries in their 24–15 win. Mount Albert fielded McNeil on the wing and also new recruit Ted Mincham from the Richmond club, as well as the returning McCallum in “a very fast three-quarter line”. The Herald wrote that “McNeil has improved and promises to develop into a good scoring wing, provided the inside backs give him opportunities. Both the wings scored fine tries, as the result of fast runs to the corner”. They went on to say that “nothing finer was witnessed than the play of the two wings… [who] both showed plenty of speed, especially McNeil, whose play was very impressive”.

Mount Albert opened their championship season with a 18–16 win against Ponsonby United on April 9 with “neither of the wings, McNeil and McCallum” getting many chances. In Round 2 McNeil scored two tries in a 25–18 win over Newton Rangers. For Mount Albert, “Mincham and McNeil were the pick of the three quarters. The former made several nice openings, and McNeil used his speed to advantage”. The Herald said that their five eighths R. Walker was “not an easy player to combine with” as he has a “tendency… to run across the ground”, and “until this is corrected, the Mount Albert three-quarters will lack opportunities. The set, McNeil, Mincham and McCallum have speed, but they are forced to do a lot of work standing flat-footed”. In round 5 Mount Albert lost to Manukau 17–9 with McNeil missing a try after Mincham passed to him “too soon and thus gave the defence time to cover”. The Auckland Star said that “McNeil did some brilliant things out on the wing, and would probably have got a try on one occasion but for the fact that Mincham in the centre unloaded too soon and gave [Jack] Hemi the chance to get across and stop the try”.

==== Auckland and North Island selection ====
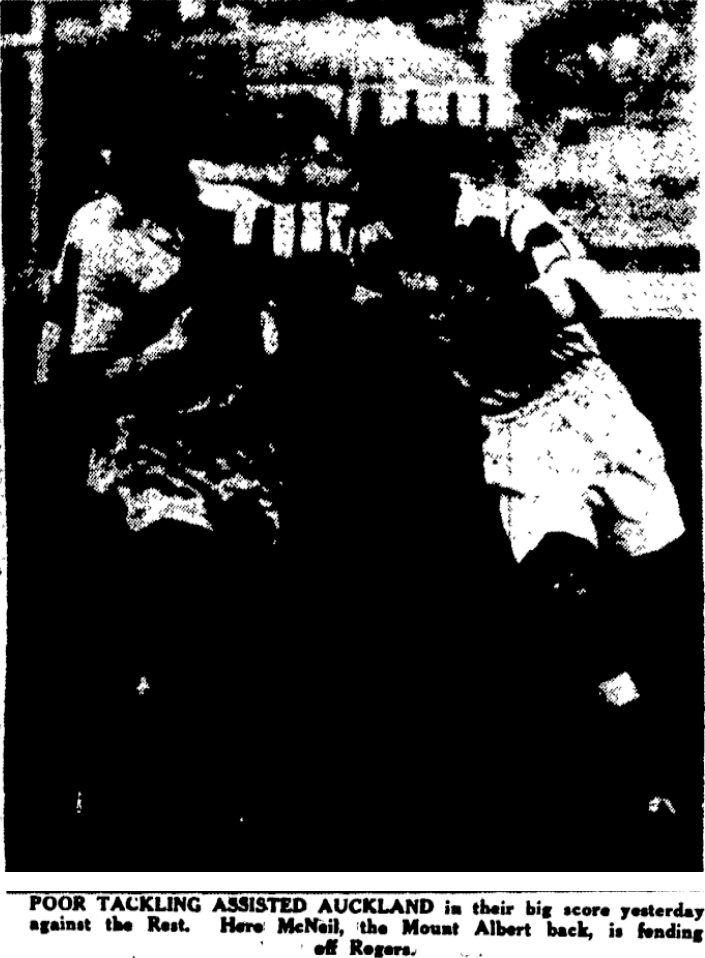

Mount Albert had the bye in round 6 and then after that weekend McNeil was selected in the Auckland team to play against a “Rest of North Island” side at Carlaw Park on May 18. The Auckland Star wrote that “McNeil of Mount Albert, Rangi Chase, of Manukau, and Brian Riley should make a speedy and effective three quarter line”. Auckland totally outclassed their opponent, winning 67 to 14 with McNeil scoring three of their 14 tries. He along with Riley on the other wing “played splendid games”. After the game the North Island team was named for their inter-island match with the South Island on May 21. The North Island team was identical to the Auckland side with the exception of McNeil who had been replaced by Gordon Midgley who was named to replace him on the wing and Joe Cootes coming into the forwards. McNeil was named in the Possibles side which was playing a curtain-raiser trial game to the inter-island match. The selectors were Thomas McClymont, Hec Brisbane, and Gordon Hooker. Ultimately McNeil moved into the North Island side replacing Brian Riley on the wing as he had declared himself unavailable for the New Zealand tour of Australia as he was unable to obtain leave from work. The North Island thrashed their opponents 55 to 2 at Carlaw Park with McNeil scoring a try. The New Zealand Herald said that Midgley and McNeil showed much promise on the wings. In the first half Rangi Chase and McNeil “penetrated the defence, but Brown came fast and saved a certain try”. Later in the same half “Chase and McNeil broke away, and the latter beat Taylor badly, but his final pass to [Angus] Gault was forward and a try was lost”. Then close to halftime Harold Tetley and Wally Tittleton who ran in support of a Joe Cootes break passed the ball on to McNeil who “raced across between the posts”. In the second half McNeil “snapped up and Gault passed to Des Herring who scored”.

==== New Zealand selection and Australian tour ====
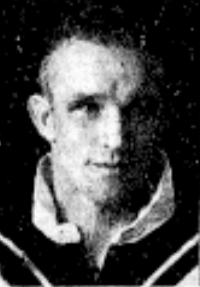
McNeil in his New Zealand jersey.

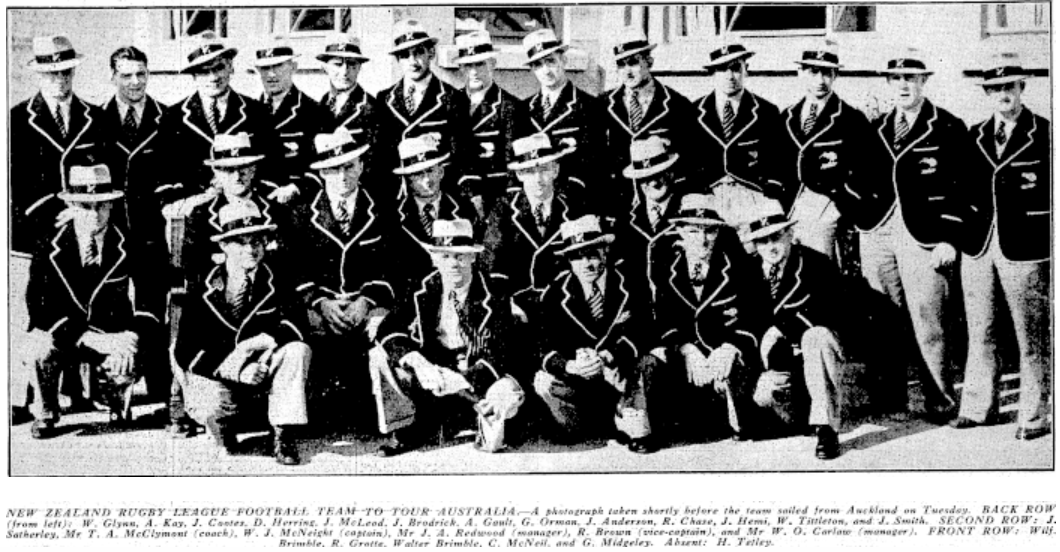
NZ Team 1938

Following the North Island win McNeil was selected for the New Zealand team's tour of Australia. The selectors were Hec Brisbane, Jim Amos, and Thomas McClymont who was also the coach of the side. He was named among five players in the three quarters including Gordon Midgley, Rangi Chase, Arthur Kay, and Ray Brown. The Auckland Star said that McNeil and Midgley are representative of the lighter type, and have the pace and dash to finalise scoring movements, provided that they are adequately catered for by the inside men”.

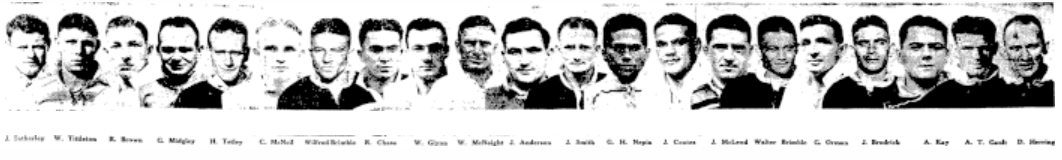

In short pieces on all of the tourists it was said that “C.A. McNeil (Auckland), wing-three quarter, is 23 years of age and weighs 11st. 7lb. He gains his representative cap for the first time. McNeil has plenty of speed, is a very determined runner and on his form against the South Island he should do well in Australia”. The article had his age incorrect as he would have been 25, around two and a half months shy of his 26th birthday. The New Zealand team departed Auckland on board the Canadian – Australasian liner, RMS Niagara on the evening of May 31.

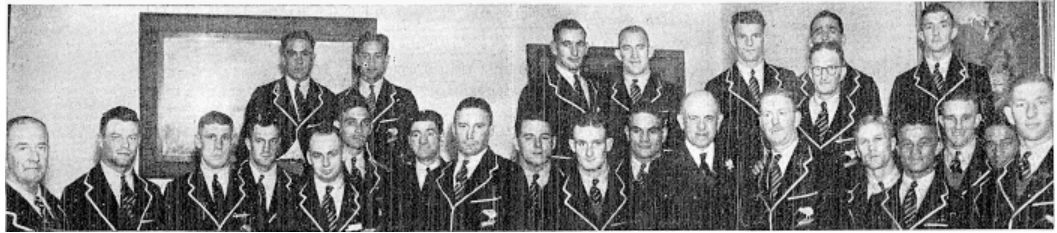
NZ team at a civic reception. McNeil is 3rd from the right in the front row

The same day they were given a civic farewell by the Mayor, Sir Ernest Davis at the Auckland Town Hall at noon following a morning tea at George Court, Limited. While the night before they had a farewell ball at the Peter Pan cabaret.

New Zealand's first tour match was against New South Wales at the Sydney Cricket Ground on June 11. Before a crowd of 28,303 New Zealand was unlucky to lose 25–12 after losing Arthur Kay to injury during the game and playing a man short when they had been on top. For the second match between the same two sides two days later it was thought that Jack Hemi would probably play in place of McNeil. The 22 man squad was narrowed to sixteen with three to be omitted with McNeil part of the nine backs listed. Writer, George Thatcher in The Labor Daily (Sydney) had said “it is certain that Tittleton will be five eight, and that Hemi will play on the wing instead of McNeil”. When the final team was named however McNeil was chosen on the wing to make his New Zealand debut with Hemi at fullback.

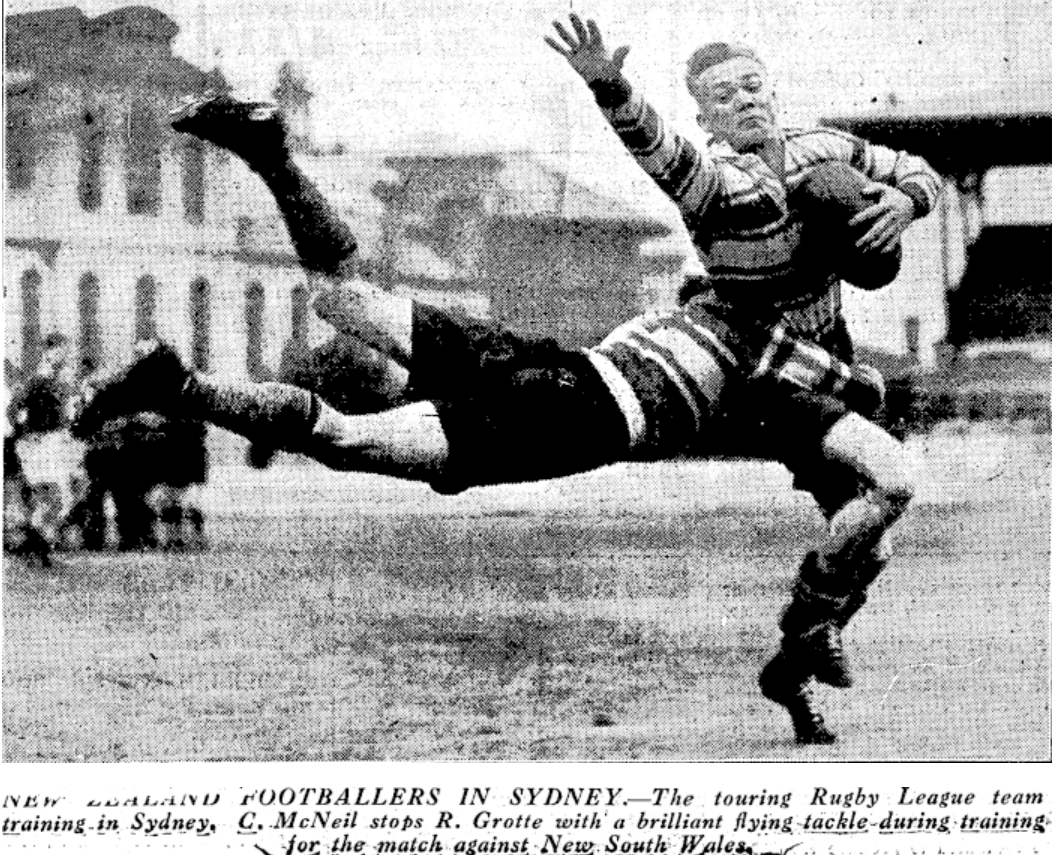

McNeil played on the left wing. In an extremely physical match on June 13 again at the Sydney Cricket Ground, New Zealand won 37–18 before 18,426 spectators. In the first half with New South Wales leading 8-2 “Hemi sent New Zealand on the offensive, and McNeil, with a clever dummy, fooled the defence, and was almost through”. Then midway through the half New Zealand “came with a grand burst, in which Brodrick, McNeil, and, McLeod were prominent”. The ball was then toed on and when William Conlon missed it Walter Brimble was handy to score with the conversion giving New Zealand a 17–8 lead. Just before halftime New Zealand broke away again through Brodrick with Orman, McLeod and McNeil also involved but it finished without score. The Referee publication wrote after the game that the New Zealand “three-quarters were: Smith, Chase, McNeil, and Tittleton. These glittered individually and in unison. Beautiful to watch, they took advantage of many errors by home backs in ground fielding and in passing”.

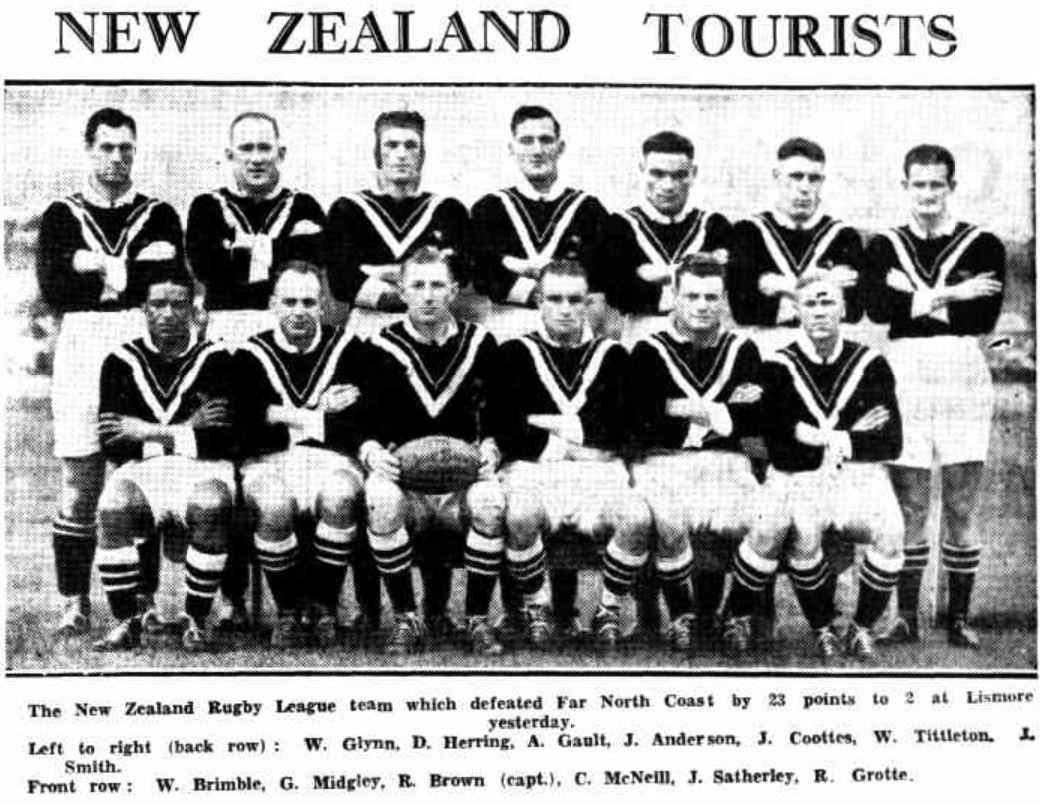
New Zealand RL team to play Far North Coast in 1938

McNeil was then named on the wing again in the New Zealand side for their next match, two days later against North Coast at Lismore. Against relatively weak opposition New Zealand struggled to a 23–2 win before a crowd of 2,200. The backs came in for some criticism with “there being a lack of enterprise”. McNeil then missed selection for the June 18 game with Queensland. He was named in a five-man three-quarter line with one to be omitted for their following game against Toowoomba on June 22 at their Athletic Ground, but was ultimately the one to miss out. Angus Gault tore a hip muscle at training and was the forward to also be omitted.

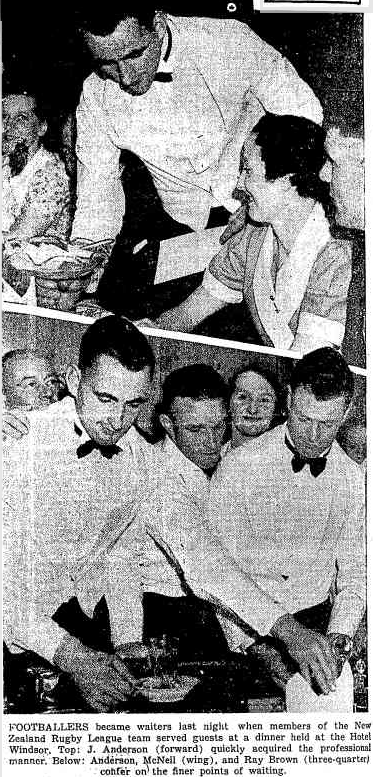
McNeil acting as a waiter at a rugby league social function in Brisbane.

McNeil missed selection again for New Zealand's second game with Queensland with Ray Brown and Arthur Kay favoured on the wings. New Zealand lost 21–12 on June 26. It was mentioned that McNeil was among the spectators in the main stand along with other members of the touring side who were not playing (Wilfred Brimble, Walter Brimble, Midgley, Gault, John Anderson, Joe Cootes, and Des Herring), and coach Thomas McClymont, and managers Jack Redwood, and W.O. Carlaw. At a function at the Hotel Windsor on June 27 some of the New Zealand players acted as waiter for the evening with John Anderson, McNeil, and Ray Brown photographed in The Courier-Mail in their temporary roles. Two days later McNeil was chosen in New Zealand's 7th tour match, with it to be McNeil's 3rd and last appearance. Their opponent was a NSW Group 4 side at Tamworth Oval. Before 2,200 spectators New Zealand won 26 to 15 with McNeil scoring one of New Zealand's six tries. McNeil's try came during the second half with New Zealand leading 21-10 and was converted by John Anderson to give them their final tally of 26 points. The Courier-Mail reported that McNeil “combined well in back movements” with Wally Tittleton who played centre. While the Auckland Star published a piece from an Australian correspondent saying that McNeil had also combined well with Arthur Kay.

McNeil was not chosen for either of the final two tour games against Newcastle (July 2), or Sydney (July 6). The team then departed Sydney on board the Aorangi which arrived at Princes Wharf in Auckland on the morning of July 11. After their return the touring side played against Auckland at Carlaw Park though McNeil was once again named in the reserves and did not play. The Auckland side won 21 to 13 on July 16.

==== Return to Mount Albert ====
After returning to New Zealand, McNeil took his place in the backs for Mount Albert. They were equal with Marist in the Fox Memorial competition and beat Richmond 11–3 in a Carlaw Park “quagmire” on July 23. In the first half McNeil and Robert Marshall (an Auckland cricket representative) “were associated in a good movement and [Charles] Dunne, on the wing, scored a spectacular try after following a long kick”. McNeil had played in the slightly unaccustomed position of centre and “played a good game and did a lot of useful work on attack. He revealed a fine burst of speed on several occasions in the second half and may develop into a good centre”. The Herald wrote that he had been “prominent on attack at centre” and it was also mentioned that former New Zealand five eighth Stan Prentice was coaching the Mount Albert side. Mount Albert then suffered a heavy loss to Manukau 31-4 which effectively ended their title hopes. Their forward Richard Shadbolt was sent off and Charles Dunne and A MacLachlan went off injured leaving them with 10 players. The following week in the penultimate round they defeated City Rovers 28–13 with McNeil scoring two tries. He had moved back to the wing by this point. In the first half Ivan Wilson made a good run before Charlie Renton “cut in nicely to enable Marshall to send McNeil over for a good try”. The later strong running by Claude List allowed McNeil to score his second. The Herald mentioned that he had played “a fine game”. In Mount Albert's final championship game they beat Papakura 44–12. McNeil scored two tries once more and played another “fine game”. Mount Albert fielded a particularly strong backline which as well as McNeil and Claude List also featured Roy Hardgrave who had returned to New Zealand from England where he had spent four seasons playing for York before joining Toulouse.

Mount Albert suffered an upset 8–2 loss to City in Round 1 of the Roope Rooster knockout competition. In the consolation Phelan Shield knockout competition they beat Marist Old Boys 6–5 on September 10. McNeil “showed a lot of dash on the wing” for Mount Albert in a game dominated by the forwards. He along with Marshall and McLachlan “gave good service in the Mount Albert backs”. Mount Albert's season came to an end a week later on September 17 when they were defeated by Manukau in the second round of the Phelan Shield.

=== 1939 Mount Albert and retirement ===
The 1939 season was to be the last for McNeil in club rugby league. It appears that he only played two matches for Mount Albert before retiring from the sport. At Mount Albert's 11th annual meeting at the King George Hall in Mount Albert in mid February, McNeil and Des Herring were congratulated on their selection in the New Zealand team to tour Australia a year earlier. In April a Sydney XIII team was touring Auckland and McNeil was named in an eighteen-man squad to play in the match. McNeil was not chosen in the side to play however. It is not known if he was retiring from the game or if he was merely omitted from a particularly strong Mount Albert back line which included three other current or future New Zealand internationals and several other good players. When Mount Albert's 16 man squad for their first championship game on April 1 had been named McNeil's name was not listed in it. McNeil was however listed in their round 5 squad for their May 6 game against Manukau though he did not play and was among the reserves. It then appears that he made his season debut against Marist the following weekend on May 13 as he was listed on the wing though was not mentioned in any match descriptions. McNeil definitely played in their round 7 loss to North Shore Albions on May 20 as he scored a try. He had nearly scored another earlier in the game but was tackled by Jack Smith who grounded him “just short of the line”.

That appears to have been the last time McNeil played for Mount Albert as he was not mentioned over the remainder of the season. In 1940 he was possibly named in the Auckland Veterans side to play the South Auckland Veterans team. However the player was named as “E McNeil” which was most likely Ernest McNeil, the former Richmond winger from the same era. He had possibly moved back out of Auckland as a “C McNeil” was named in a tennis tournament at his old home area of Netherton in February 1941 and continued to be named associated with tennis games in the area over the following months.

=== 1942 Return to rugby union ===
In April, 1942 McNeil was called up to service in the military as part of the fifteenth ballot as part of 71 men from the Hauraki Plains. They were mostly aged between 29 and 32. It was noted that he was a farmer from Turua at the time. Later in the year in the sixteenth ballot his brother Alexander Frederick McNeil was called up. He too was a farmer, though further north at Colville. These men were mostly aged around 35 to 37 and were married with children.

It appears that Clarry McNeil was not required to serve however as there are no records of him as having served in the New Zealand World War 2 effort. On August 29 McNeil played a rugby union match for Thames against Pukekohe on the later teams home ground. He would have turned 30 years old three weeks earlier. Pukekohe won 23 to 6 with McNeil at outside centre. The Franklin Times wrote that the Thames backs would have been “more troublesome” on a dry day and in “S. Fisher the captain, J. Grey, and C. McNeil, ex-league international, they possessed nippiness and a sound knowledge of tactics”. They went on to say that “little was seen of McNeil as very rarely did the ball go for an airing through the Thames backline, but when he did get the ball he ran diagonally to crowd his wings”. It is unclear who he was playing for during this season or during the next as there were occasionally McNeil's mentioned as playing rugby in the Thames area but they were initialled “B McNeil” and “G McNeil” in various Veteran's and Coromandel sides and he had many relatives in the area. It seems either way that McNeil had entirely finished playing either rugby league or rugby union by the end of the 1943 season.

== Personal life ==
In 1935 McNeil was living in the Green Lane suburb of Auckland at 15 Waiohua Road with his occupation listed as a driver. He was living with his brother Allan Leo who was a fellmonger and his mother, Winifred, who was widowed. He of course moved to the Wellington area where he lived from 1936 to 1937 before returning to Auckland. In 1938 on May 16 Clarry married Dorothy May Harvey (1912–1974). Together they had eight children including seven sons and one daughter. Known sons were Kenneth Riley McNeil (1954–2022), Brian, Graham, Ian, and Cameron. Brian, Ian, and Graham played rugby league for Otahuhu while Cameron (Cammy) played rugby union for Kerepehi (Thames) and is the uncle of the 1961 Kiwi, Jim Ford.

In 1941 he was recorded as being back at 15 Waiohua Road in Green Lane. Allan Leo was still living there as was his mother. Also there was his other brother Albert Louvain (a butcher), and his sister Alice Winifred who was a spinster. Clarry McNeil's wife Dorothy was listed as living a short distance away at 95a Ladies Mile in Ellerslie. Later in 1941 Clarry and Dorothy had moved out of Auckland and were living together at Orchard East Road in Turua with Clarry farming.

By 1942 McNeil was farming in the small settlement of Turua between Thames and Ngatea on the banks of the Waihou River. Their address was listed as Hamilton Road in Turua. A year later in a Public Notice in the Auckland Star it was recorded that a Goods Service transfer had been made to McNeil from W Caldwell. He continued to farm in the area while living with Dorothy through the 1940s and early 1950s. They then moved further north and were farming around the Rings Road area in Coromandel by 1954. According to the 1957 and 1960 electoral rolls Clarry was now working as a milk vendor, while still living with Dorothy on Rings Rd in Coromandel. There was a large number of McNeil's immediate and extended family living in the area at this time. By 1963 McNeil was listed as back farming again in the Coromandel.

In the 1960s Clarry and Dorothy moved back to Auckland. In 1966 Clarry was working as a Brewer and they lived at 80 McLean Avenue in Papatoetoe. It is unknown where he worked but their address was relatively close to the Waitemata Brewery Co. which operated from 1929 to the present day on the corner of Great South Road and Baird's Road in Otahuhu. Two years later in 1969 Clarry was now working as and Animal Researcher while still living at the same address in Papatoetoe with Dorothy and sons Brian and Graham who worked as concrete worker and slaughterman respectively. By 1972 Clarry now aged 60, was working as a fitter, still living at the same address. Two years later in 1974 his wife Dorothy died aged 62. Clarry remained living at 80 McLean Avenue throughout the remainder of the 1970s and working as a fitter, possibly living alone.

He then retired and moved to Tiki Road in the Coromandel. He continued to live in the Coromandel township area for the remaining decades of his life. By 1995 he was at 1740 Rings Road and was a pensioner now aged 83. Clarry McNeil died on September 7, 2001, in Coromandel, aged 89.
