= Aorangi =

Aorangi may refer to:

- Aoraki / Mount Cook, a name for New Zealand's highest mountain
- Aorangi Island, the smaller of the two large islands that make up the Poor Knights Islands
- Aorangi Oval, a cricket ground in Timaru
- Aorangi Range, the southernmost mountain range of New Zealand's North Island
- Aorangi School, a former school in Christchurch
- Aorangi (ship), several ships of this name
- Aorangi Terrace, an area in the grounds of the All England Lawn Tennis and Croquet Club
- Feilding, known as Aorangi in Māori
- Mount Aorangi, the highest mountain in the Millen Range of Antarctica
