= Des Herring =

New Zealand international rugby league player

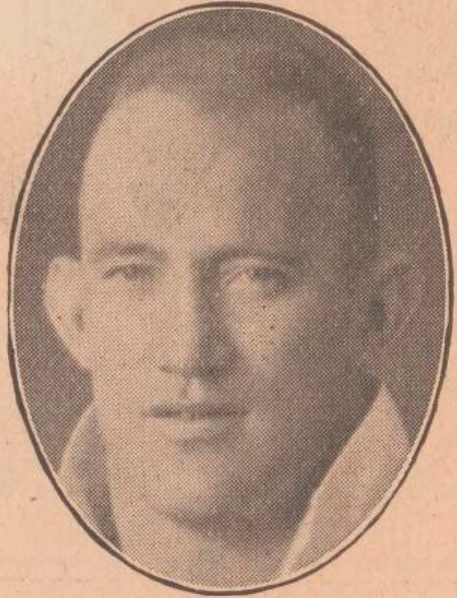

Personal information
- Full name: Desmond Joseph Herring
- Born: 18 March 1915 Grey Lynn, Auckland, New Zealand
- Died: 21 March 2006 (aged 91) Epsom, Auckland, New Zealand

Playing information
- Height: 180 cm (5 ft 11 in)
- Weight: 14 st 3 lb (90 kg)
- Position: Prop, Second-row
Club
Years	Team	Pld	T	G	FG	P
1932–1934	Marist Old Boys	25	11	7	0	47
1934–1940	Mount Albert United	94	34	34	0	170
1934	Ponsonby XIII (exhibition)	1	0	0	0	0
	Total	120	45	41	0	217
Representative
Years	Team	Pld	T	G	FG	P
1933–1935	Auckland Trial	2	0	0	0	0
1935–1939	Auckland	7	6	0	0	18
1935	Auckland Province	1	0	0	0	0
1938	North Island	1	3	0	0	9
1938	New Zealand	4	0	0	0	0
1939	Auckland Pākehā	2	1	2	0	7
1939	New Zealand Trial	1	0	0	0	0
- As of 1 July 2024

Desmond Joseph Herring (18 March 1915 – 21 March 2006) was a rugby league player who represented New Zealand. He played four matches in the forward of their 1938 tour of Australia, becoming the 261st player to represent New Zealand. He also played 7 matches for Auckland, 2 for Auckland Pākehā, 1 for Auckland Province, and 1 for the North Island. He played his club rugby league for Marist Old Boys (26 games), and then from 1934 onwards for Mount Albert (94 games).

== Early life ==
Des Herring was born on March 18, 1915, in Grey Lynn, Auckland, New Zealand. His parents were William Edward Herring (1891–1970), and Mary Margaret Herring. Des was an only child. His uncle Frank Herring was a prominent rugby union player in the early 1900s and played for the City club, and represented Auckland and the North Island. He was selected for the New Zealand tour of Australia in 1910 but could not tour "owing to pressure of business" and retired in 1912.

Des Herring attended Sacred Heart College, Auckland in the 1920s when it was located on its former site in Ponsonby, the present day location of St Paul's College. In mid November, 1927 when he would have been aged 12 he scored 21 and 27 runs for Sacred Heart A cricket team in the Catholic Primary Schools competition. He scored 65 not out the following weekend against St Benedict's.

== Playing career ==
=== Marist Old Boys Rugby League Club ===
It appears that Des was playing for the Marist Old Boys rugby union clubs seventh grade side in 1927. In 1928 he continued to play for the same team, aged 13. By 1930 a Herring was being named in the Marist Old Boys rugby league club side in the third grade. Des' cousin Frank was playing for Kingsland Athletic in the same season in their first grade side. By 1932 Frank was playing in the City Rovers first grade side alongside his brother, another of Des' cousins, James Sinclair Herring, while another cousin, John Reginald Herring was in their reserve grade side. James and John (better known as Reginald) had recently transferred from the Marist club. That same 1932 season Des had progressed to the Marist senior reserve side.

==== Senior debut (Marist) ====
Des Herring made his senior debut in a match of significance, being the 1932 Stormont Shield final on September 17. Herring was aged just 17 at the time, an extraordinarily young age for a senior player let alone a forward in this era. It was a match played annually between the first grade champions (Devonport United in 1932), and Marist who were the 1932 Roope Rooster knockout winners. Marist won the trophy with a 15–8 win at Carlaw Park with Herring in the second row. The Auckland Star wrote that "[Alan] Clarke, [Huck] Flanagan and Herring toiled honestly and hard all the time". Herring missed a conversion following a try late in the match to Claude List, but with little more than a minute remaining he scored a try near the posts which was converted by Bill Cornthwaite. The New Zealand Herald wrote in a review of the match that Jim Laird "was perhaps the best of the forwards, but Herring, Herb Carter and Fraser Webberley worked hard in the tight in the second spell". Herring was named in the reserves for the first grade sides Max Jaffe Cup charity match with Ponsonby United on October 8 but is unlikely to have taken the field. Jim Laird was injured in the match and Herring was named to replace him for their final match of the season. The match was between Marist and an Auckland XIII to help raise funds for Trevor Hanlon who was an Auckland player who had been playing in England and needed assistance in returning home. Marist won 17 points to 16 on October 16 at Carlaw Park. The Auckland Star newspaper said that "Herring, Thompson and Flanagan were outstanding of the Marist van, which had the best of it in weight". In the second half Herring took a conversion attempt (once again following a try to Claude List) but he "just failed".

==== 1933 Marist seniors ====
The 1933 season saw Herring become a regular in the first grade side at Marist Old Boys. He played 21 games, scoring 8 tries and also kicking 7 goals. Herring was also selected in an Auckland trial match. This was a unique feat for somebody of his relatively young age of 18 where most other senior forward in Auckland were in their early to mid 20's when they made their rep debuts. At the start of the season in a preview of various teams prospects the New Zealand Herald wrote that "a trio of promising forwards, Herring, Iveson, and Flanagan, will assist the [Marist] vanguard". For their opening game of the season he was named at prop alongside hooker Gordon Campbell who had represented New Zealand the previous year. It was a powerful side which also included New Zealand representatives Wilf Hassan, Claude List, and Hec Brisbane in the backline. Marist lost their opening game 18–14 to City Rovers on April 29 at Carlaw Park with Herring kicking 2 conversions and 2 penalties. It was said that he "was always in the picture". He also found himself up against his cousins Frank and James in the City side.

Marist lost again the following week, 10–5 to Devonport United. The Marist forward included Jim Laird and Alan Clarke, also New Zealand representatives. It was mentioned that Herring "again played a good game". In their first win of the season, 8–5 over Ponsonby United in round 3, Herring kicked a penalty though he also missed two other attempts. He "showed up amongst the forwards" along with "Huck" Flanagan, Jim Iveson, and Herb Carter. Herring kicked another goal in an 11–6 win over Newton Rangers in round 4, though he did miss 4 other attempts. The Auckland Star wrote "the two outstanding forwards on the [Marist] side were Laird and Herring". Then in another win, by 12 points to 6 over Richmond Rovers Herring scored a try. It was said that "of a good set of forwards, solid workers one and all, Herring and Iveson were much in the limelight". And that "Laird, Iveson and Herring were conspicuous. The last two named each made a bad error when faced by the full-back in failing to pass to support". His try came after Hec Brisbane had made a nice run. While his error occurred after he had intercepted a pass and instead of passing when he came to Lee, the Richmond full-back, he kicked ahead and lost the chance.

Marist had their first loss in several weeks, 13–8 to City on June 3. Following the game the Herald published the leading point scorers thus far and Herring was in 8th place with 16. Laird and Herring "were always prominent" in the loss. In the first half Norm Campbell made a long break and passed to Herring who then sent Jim Laird over for a try. In the second half Laird and Herring combined to nearly give George Batchelor a try. A week later Marist had a big 35–9 win over an injury depleted Devonport side, with Herring converting one of their 9 tries. He was one of the outstanding Marist forward, however he did miss several shots at goal which had been a habit through the season to this point. It was noted though that two of the misses were from the sideline and saw the ball rebound off the crossbar. In another heavy win over Ponsonby 34–17, Herring scored a try "from a scramble" and gave "solid support" to Iveson and Laird. He took four conversion attempts and missed all of them.

Against Newton on July 1, Herring scored 3 tries in a 24–8 win at Carlaw Park. The Auckland Star wrote that "Webberley, Herring, and Laird were the pick of a robust pack. Herring should be now stand high in the estimation of the selectors". The Herald said that he "showed good judgment in supporting the backs. His three tries were well deserved". His first try came after "Bert Schultz burst through for Herring to score", his second happened after Schultz followed a kick and passed to Webberley but he missed the ball and Herring grabbed it and crossed over. Another try followed late in the game, though once again a blight on his game was a couple more missed goal attempts. In a 13–5 win over Richmond on July 8 Herring was "prominent" along with Webberley, though Laird was their best forward.

Following the match the Auckland side was chosen to play South Auckland (Waikato) side. In addition to the side, two teams were chosen to play an Auckland trial match with Herring selected in the B Team. His cousin James Herring was also named in the forward pack alongside him. The 'Herrings' B Team won 16 points to 9 though the only match report written was brief and did not mention the cousins.

Marist had a first round win in the Roope Rooster knockout competition on July 29 but then were defeated by Richmond 10–0 in the semi-final on August 5. Herring nearly scored during the second half after Iveson made a break, passed to Bert Schultz, who then gave it to Herring who "was pulled down five yards from the Richmond line". With a good deal of time left in the season after a relatively short 10 round championship the Auckland Rugby League decided to play a Challenge Round competition with 5 rounds. Marist lost in their first game 13–11 to Newton with Herring scoring one of their tries and it was said that he was "outstanding". In a 10–5 win over City a week later "Laird and Herring were Marist's best forwards". They won their round 5 match to finish second behind Newton. Their 21–17 win over Ponsonby saw Herring score one of their five tries.

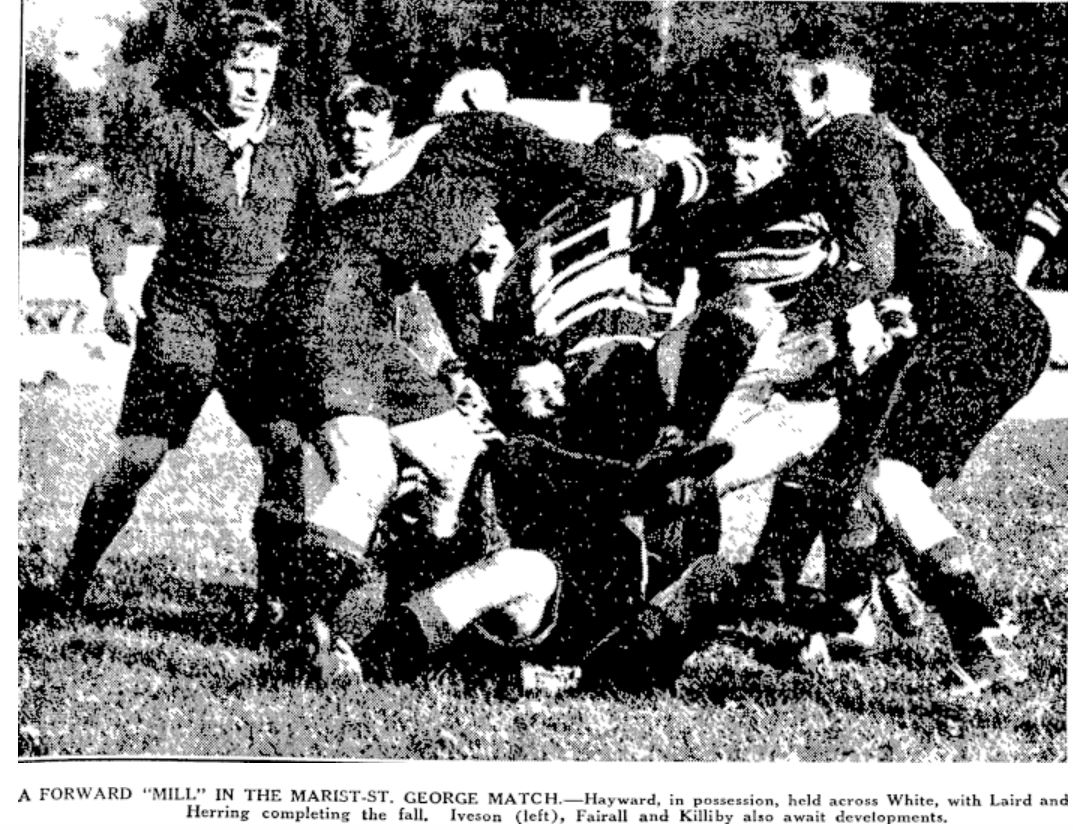
Marist v St George, 1933

On September 30 Marist played against the touring St. George side from Sydney. St. George had finished runner up in the 1933 NSWRFL competition. Marist had a comfortable 25–11 win at Carlaw Park before an enormous crowd of 13,000. With the score 12–8 to Marist, "good tackling by Herring gave Marists a chance, and when the ball came out to Wilf Hassan the halfback dashed between himself over for a score". In comments on the match the Star said "Iveson and Herring were ever prominent". Herring had played prop, with Gord Campbell at hooker and Huck Flanagan the other prope, with Sprouster and Tom Haywood the props for St. George and P Fairall at hooker. At one point Herring dropped a pass from Carter which lost a possible try. A photograph appeared in the Star showing Herring involved in a tackle of Hayward. With the season reaching its final stages Marist played a match for the Max Jaffe Cup against Richmond on October 7. Marist were well defeated 31–8 though Herring managed to score. His try came when Hec Brisbane made a break and passed to Herring who "ran a few yards and threw himself across under the posts". Their final game of the season was against Richmond once more on October 21 to raise money for the unemployed. Marist won 16 to 5 with a goal kicking competition held before the match. This was won by Herring, beating Norm Campbell, O'Halloran, and Hogg.

==== Dispute with Marist, and transfer to Mount Albert (1934) ====
The 1934 season was an eventful one for Herring and several other Marist players however he saw little time on the field as a result. In a dispute with the club he and other first grade Marist players were suspended and later many of them moved to the Mount Albert United club. The coach for the season was to be Charles Gregory, with the secretary, Jack Kirwan. A "T Herring" was named the club captain, though it is unclear if they were related to Des.

In round 1 of the championship Marist lost 28–8 to Ponsonby with Herring scoring one of Marist's tries. It was said that Herring, Laird and Iveson were the "best forwards" for Marist. Herring missed their next two matches against Richmond and City. Marist lost both games and it was reported that "the return of Laird and Herring should make a power of difference". He was named in their side to play Devonport United on May 19 and Marist won 16 to 10. Herring then scored a try in a 22–13 loss to Newton. It was reported that he and Laird "were prominent packmen, fit for any class. They revealed dash in the open, and Herring was rewarded for one of his determined dashes".

===== Dispute with Marist management =====
Herring missed Marists next game against Ponsonby on June 2. Some details of the dispute were published in the Auckland Star on June 8, stating that "as the result of a disagreement in the Marist Old Boys' Rugby League Club, eight players did not appear with the senior teams last week...the players concerned are" Charles Dunn, Des Herring, Gordon Campbell, Wilf Hassan, the three Schultz brothers, and Claude List. It was said that "several committee members and some players were dis-satisfied on a point of club finance, whether portion of expenditure should apply to senior players alone or be devoted to general club services, including juniors". The players decided to adopt "an attitude of passive resistance". The players were suspended by the club at a point soon after, missing several matches. On July 4 Herring led a deputation of players to the Auckland Rugby League to meet with the committee. Herring told chairman Mr. G. Grey Campbell that "applications for transfers had been refused four prominent players", and Herring asked that a special meeting of the New Zealand Council (Rugby League) be called to discuss the points raised. In the meantime the Marist club had made an appeal to the New Zealand Council themselves. The Auckland Rugby League had earlier ruled that the suspension of the players by Marist was out of order and the club had appealed this to the New Zealand body. The appeal was upheld by the organisation who said that the suspensions were confirmed.

===== Transfer to Mount Albert =====
Then around 4 weeks later on August 1 the Auckland Rugby League conformed that the transfer of Claude List, G Flanagan, Gordon Campbell, J Schultz, Len Schultz, and Bert Schultz had been granted, with Des Herring and G Gunn to follow. With all the players moving to Mount Albert United. At the time the Mount Albert club did not have senior status but applied for it at the same time and was also granted permission to play in the upcoming first grade Roope Rooster competition. Herrings first game for Mount Albert was against Tuakau in a friendly game on August 12. Mount Albert won 16 to 9 at Tuakau with Herring converting two of their four tries.

In Mount Alberts first ever match in an official first grade game they lost to Ponsonby 19–11 in round 1 of the Roope Rooster competition. Herring converted one of their tries with former New Zealand representative Roy Hardgrave also having joined the side. They then lost to Newton in the Phelan Shield to finish their season in club competitions. In mid September the Mount Albert club travelled to Napier to play Taradale. Mount Albert win 22–12 with Herring converting a try before a crowd of 1,000 at Taradale Park. Herring was then selected for a Ponsonby XIII to play the touring Western Suburbs side who had won the NSW RL championship for 1934. Western Suburbs won 26 to 13 on October 3. Herring found himself at prop with Selwyn Davis and John Donald his front row partners, up against B Green, A. Blake, and J. Hartwell of Western Suburbs. The newspapers reported that Herring "was a grafter from bell to bell" Herring was then named to play in the Auckland Colts side to play against Auckland Māori (Tāmaki) on October 20 on Charity Day. However, on game day he was omitted from the side along with several other forward changes possibly due to availability, and his season came to an end.

==== Mount Albert and Auckland debut (1935) ====
The 1935 season saw Herring playing his first full season with them and he played in 12 matches, scoring 5 tries. He also made his Auckland debut and went on to play 4 games for them. He also featured in an Auckland Province match against Australia. In their first game of the season Herring scored two tries in a 13–8 win over City on April 27. However "after paving the wat for Mount Albert by scoring two tries [he] had the misfortune to break his collarbone in what should have been his third try" according to the Auckland Star. They went on to say that Mount Albert "should show considerable improvement next time out, but the temporary loss of the services of Herring is serious". The Herald wrote "of the forwards Herring was easily the best. He scored two clever tries, and a few minutes later had the misfortune to injure his collarbone". In another article where the Herald said he "generally gave a fine display" they also mentioned that he had broken his collar bone however it later turned out that he had only dislocated it. It was reported on May 22, three weeks after the injury that he had "now fully recovered" and might be available soon.

He returned for their round 6 match against Ponsonby on June 1 which they won 23–13. He played at lock rather than prop and "played cautiously". Despite this he was one of "the best" of the Mount Albert forward. He was named at lock again for their June 8 game with his former team, Marist. He, Carl Spiro, Joseph Gunning, and Richard Shadbolt were "valuable packmen" for Mount Albert in the 11–11 draw. The Herald said that Herring was "the outstanding forward" in their side. Playing at lock once more in their game with City at the Onehunga Recreation Reserve he was one of their "best forwards" in their 27–14 win. Then in their next match, against Richmond the Herald said that "only selfish play by Herring robbed the team of a certain try". Despite this they still won 5–3. Mount Albert then narrowly beat Newton 3–0 on June 29 with Herring playing well in a good Mount Albert forward pack which was well matched by Newton. The Herald said that he was "prominent" along with Shadbolt and Gunning.

Mount Albert had a bye the following weekend and travelled to Taupiri by bus to play against the local side with Herring named among the 16 travellers. It's unclear if Herring played as it was said some of the best players from either side didn't play and Mount Albert lost 11–6. Back in Auckland Herring was named back at prop for their game with Devonport which they drew 8–8 at Carlaw Park. He played "a fine game" and missed a try after McNeil gave him a clear run in but he tripped over. In a bad tempered game with Marist that featured a lot of fighting, Herring was sent off along with Wilf Hassan, Herb Carter, and Huck Flanagan by referee Maurice Wetherill. Mount Albert won the match 18–6 with Herring scoring twice before his dismissal and he was said to have been "outstanding" with his two tries coming after being "up with the play". Herring played at lock and was "easily the best forward", combining well with Hassan at halfback. Though he actually moved out of the scrum and played as an extra back with Marist failing to deal with the tactic which resulted in three of their tries.

===== Auckland debut =====
Herring was suspended for a match for his fighting, along with Herb Carter, his former teammate at Marist. Despite this he was named to make his Auckland debut in their August 3 match against Taranaki. He was named at lock by selectors William Mincham, Ernie Asher, and Bert Avery, with Auckland also fielding a side on the same day against South Auckland (Waikato). His suspension was served by missing Mount Albert's game with Ponsonby on July 27. Auckland won the match 37–14 with Herring scoring one of their nine tries. The team scored through individual play rather than team work and it was said that "Herring had shown better form in club matches".

Herring then returned to Mount Albert for their championship final match against Richmond Rovers on August 10. Both teams had been runaway leaders in the Fox Memorial competition and were tied on 19 points through 14 rounds. The Auckland Rugby League scheduled a playoff between the two to decide the winners. A strong Richmond side which featured twelve New Zealand internationals and an Auckland representative beat them 14–9. Herring, Carl Spiro, and Richard Shadbolt were "never far from the ball when there was work to be done for Mount Albert". The Herald said the three of them "played brilliantly throughout the game".

On August 17 the annual North Island v South Island fixture was played and on the same day as curtain raiser an Auckland trial match was played between A and B teams. Herring was named in the Auckland B team. Auckland A won the match 22–19 with it said that Harold Tetley was the B teams "best forward, well supported by Lawless and Herring". Herring then returned to the Mount Albert side for their round 1 Roope Rooster match with Marist. Mount Albert won 18–15 with Herring scoring one of their four tries. Once again the match between the two sides was ill-tempered with Mount Albert forward, Shadbolt sent off for fighting. With the score 15–15 Herring scored the deciding try in the corner just a few minutes to go. Herring and Spiro "were the best of the forwards" for the winners. The following week Mount Albert lost their Roope Rooster semi-final to Richmond 20–6 with Herring, Spiro and Gunning the best of the Mount Albert forward.

===== Auckland touring side =====
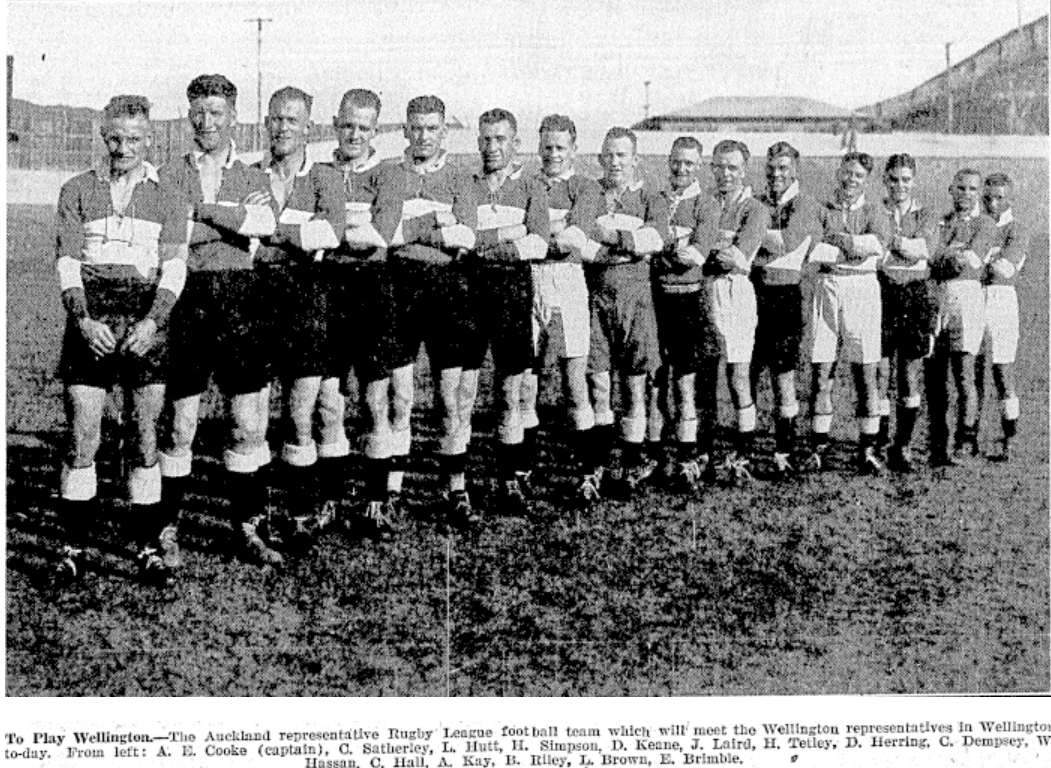

Herring was named in the Auckland team to tour the south with matches against Wellington, West Coast, and Canterbury. They were accompanied on the trip by chairman Mr. C Grey Campbell, Bert Avery a well known former New Zealand captain and one of the most outstanding forward of the era, and Thomas McClymont, a former international and arguably New Zealand's most prominent rugby league coach. Herring played at prop in their first game against Wellington at Newtown Park in Wellington on September 7. Auckland won the game 39 to 27 before a crowd of 3,000. With Wellington leading 7–0 Ted Brimble in the five-eighths "made a neat opening, handing to [Arthur] Kay, to send on to Herring after gaining ground" before Herring crossed for the try. It was reported that in the Auckland forward Lou Hutt and Harold Tetley "were possibly the best", but Cliff Satherley, Jim Laird, and Herring "were always in the picture". The Wellington correspondent for the Herald newspaper said that "the best Auckland forwards were L. Hutt and Herring".

For the game against the West Coast at Victoria Park in Greymouth on September 11 Herring was chosen in the second row alongside Cliff Satherley, with Harold Tetley at lock. Auckland won 32–14 before a large midweek crowd of 2,000 spectators in fine weather. Auckland led 10–3 at halftime after Auckland had played with the assistance of a strong wind. With the scores 10–6 Arthur Kay made a break before losing the ball but Tetley picked it up and sent Herring in for a try in the corner. Auckland then dominated the remainder of the match. It was said that the West Coast forward had been superior, but the Auckland backs led by captain Bert Cooke, and Lou Brown proved the difference.

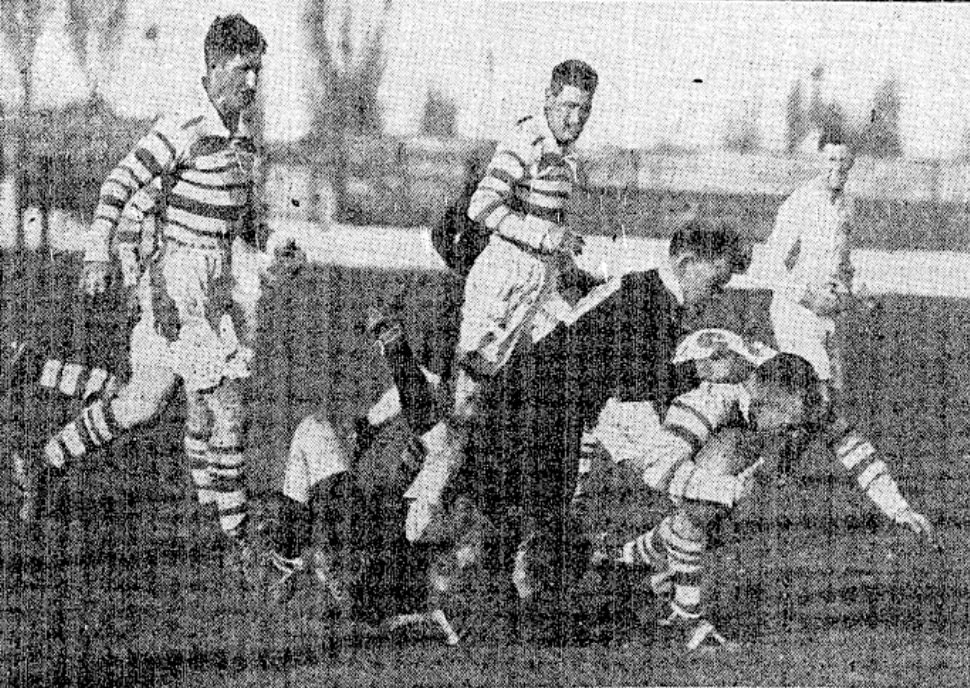
Herring being tackled by A Stuart and J McCarthy in their match against Canterbury

Auckland then traveled to Christchurch to play Canterbury on September 14 at Monica Park in their last tour match. In profiles of the Auckland players the Press newspaper said that "D. Herring (13st 3lb) is 21 years old, and comes of a family that has provided many New Zealand representatives. A second row or front row forward of great promise, he plays for Mount Albert, and was picked as the best forward against Wellington". Auckland completed their third win with a 26 to 13 score in their favour before a crowd of 3,000. Herring played in the second row once more with Cliff Satherley beside him again. The Press published a photograph of Herring being tackled by A. Stuart and J. McCarthy.

After returning from the tour Herring was named as the reserve forward for Auckland's match against the touring Australian side for their September 20 match at Carlaw Park. Ultimately Herring was not required to take the field in Auckland's 16–8 loss. He was however selected in the Auckland Province match against the tourists in their final match on October 9. Herring was named at prop along with Lou Hutt. Auckland was well beaten 36–18. The Herald wrote that "Tetley and Herring were the best of the Auckland forwards".

==== Mount Albert (1936) ====
The 1936 season saw Herring play no representative rugby league. He played 16 games for Mount Albert and scored 7 tries, also kicking 5 goals. In mid April in an article on the various senior teams prospects the Auckland Star reported that Mount Albert would have Flanagan, Herring, Constable, Gunning, and Shadbolt in their pack. The New Zealand Herald said that Herring "showed excellent all-round form last season, and is a fine player in the loose". On April 18 a special round of matches was played to raise money for all the clubs and a benefit fund for Jim Laird who had been injured playing for New Zealand against Australia at the end of the previous season. Mount Albert beat Richmond 22–15 with Herring converting one of their six tries and he was "always prominent" along with Constable.

In their round 1, Fox Memorial match Mount Albert beat Newton narrowly 6–5 with Herring scoring their first try to put them ahead 3–2 at halftime. The star reported that the forward were "well led by Herring and [Clarrie] Petersen, [and] they kept the opposition busy". Petersen was a recent rugby union recruit from the Hawkes Bay. Herring was playing in the second row to start the season. Mount Albert lost their round 2 game to Devonport United 10–5 with the newspapers saying that "Herring as usual, was in the thick of the hard stuff". He appeared to alternate between the front row and the loose forward through the following weeks. He was "always in the picture" in a good forward effort which saw Mount Albert beat Richmond 13–12 in round 3. They then lost to Ponsonby 22–20 in another even match. In a very good display by Mount Albert Peterson stood out but Herring, Joseph Gunning, and B. Constable all "gave splendid displays of forward play". Herrings second try of the season came against Manukau on May 30 in a 23–18 win. Manukau had been readmitted to the senior grade competition for the first time since 1913. Herring was among the "hardest grafters" in the Mount Albert forward.

Herring missed their next match against City on June 6 but after the game was named in the reserves for both Auckland in their match against Wellington, and Auckland Pākehā against Auckland Māori by selector Bert Avery. Both games were being played on Tuesday, June 23 at Carlaw Park. Herring was not required to take the field for either side. He scored a try the following Saturday in Mount Albert's 10–7 win over local rivals Marist. He scored their second try after a break from Ray Halsey which ultimately gave them the win. Then in an 11–8 win over Newton Herring scored another try and also converted one of their tries. The win meant they were tied with Ponsonby and Devonport for the championship lead after 8 rounds. In addition to his scoring he and Shadbolt gave good support to Petersen who was the best forward on the ground. His try scoring run continued with another in Mount Albert's 9–7 win over Devonport. Petersen was "the best forward on the ground, and Herring gave him thorough support". Mount Albert then drew with Richmond 11–11 before a 10–4 win over Ponsonby on July 18. Herring kicked a penalty in the victory. The match was played at Carlaw Park where the majority of the games had been all season in a sea of mud. The Auckland Star joked that "men who looked like Petersen, Herring, and Flanagan were always in the thick of the mud for Mount Albert" while the Herald said the same players were "to the fore". At times in the second half play was stopped so players could wash mud out of their eyes using buckets of water on the sideline.

With Mount Albert in the lead for the championship they suffered a crucial defeat to the fast improving Manukau side 11–6 in round 12. Their following game against City was then postponed due to poor weather while Manukau's match was played seeing them win 24–7 and take the championship lead. The Auckland Rugby League decided that the postponed matches would only be played if they would have a bearing on the championship. If Mount Albert had beaten Marist in round 14 their postponed match with City would have been required and a win would have seen them draw level with Manukau thus necessitating a playoff for the title. However they were upset by Marist 13–10 on August 29. Herring scored all ten of Mount Alberts points with two tries both of which he also converted. His first try came after their halfback Watkins worked the blindside from a scrum to send Herring over with an in-pass. The Herald said that "Herring was constantly in the picture, and emerged with honours thick upon him. He worried the opposition continually bu his fast breaking from the back of the scrum, and, as a result of always being up with the play, scored his side's two tries. He was also in kicking form and notched the rest of Mount Albert's 10 points with his boot". Mount Albert had also been hampered by Bert Schultz being unable to play and Petersen being forced on to the wing, and captain Len Schultz and the third brother John having to leave the field injured in the second half.

With the season drawing to a conclusion the knockout competitions began. Injury hit Mount Albert were knocked out of the Roope Rooster immediately with a 20–6 loss to Devonport on September 5. The Auckland Star said that "there were some tireless workers in the Mount Albert vanguard and Shadbolt, Herring, and O'Brien stood out". Mount Albert were then knocked out of the consolation Phelan Shield tournament in round 1 by Ponsonby 23–13 on September 12. Herring and Petersen were the "pick of the forwards" for the losers.

With Mount Albert's official competitive season over they journeyed to Napier the following week to play Hawkes Bay. Herring played off the back of the scrum at lock and Mount Albert won 20–11 at League Park on September 19. The Mount Albert reserve grade side played the curtain raiser against the Taradale club.

==== Mount Albert and Auckland (1937) ====
Herring was now entering his fifth full season in the first grade but was remarkable still aged only 22. In 1937 he played 21 games for Mount Albert, scoring 6 tries and also made the Auckland for the first time since 1935 in an end of season match against New Zealand Māori. Herring's first game of the season was in a pre-season "preliminary" round match against Ponsonby on April 17. Representative player Cliff Satherley had joined the Mount Albert side as player-coach and led them to a 21–10 win with Martin Hanson, Richard Shadbolt and Herring giving "splendid support". Herring was "never far from the ball when work required to be done". They drew their second preliminary game 11–11 with City with Herring and Allen giving "excellent support" to Satherley. Mount Albert lost their round one match with Richmond before a 22–15 win over City in round two with Herring among the standout forward for them. In a 13–0 win over North Shore in round 5 Herring was "prominent" and also scored one of their three tries. His try came after he was sent over by Len Schultz.

Herring was not mentioned in the newspapers in any of their matches with Marist, Ponsonby, and New Plymouth when they participated in a 'travel round' where six of their Auckland senior sides played games around the North Island on June 19. In a 15–2 loss to Richmond in round 8 Herring was "prominent" along with forward Gunning, Satherley, and Hansen. They again used the word "prominent" (along with Bert Leatherbarrow and Jack Tristram to describe him in their 6–3 win against City on July 10, where he scored one of their tries. He was "prominent" yet again a week later when Mount Albert lost 15–13 to Marist. The Herald said he was "the pick of the forwards" and was "unlucky to miss the ball in a race to touch down". On July 24 in an easy 29–5 win over Newton, Herring scored two of their seven tries. He was the pick of "a hard working pack" along with Shadbolt and Gunning. Mount Albert had another big win, 20–0 against Ponsonby the following week though Herring was criticised for playing off side too much along with Tristram. He scored another try in a 20–19 win over Manukau in round 13 and was "conspicuous" along with Tristram, Satherley, and Gunning in their forward pack.

Going in to the final round of the championship Mount Albert were on 18 competition points along with Marist, with Richmond one point ahead of them. Mount Albert beat North Shore 38–22 however Marist also won (17–8 over Ponsonby) and Richmond defeated Newton easily 30–9 to claim the championship. Herring "showed up well in the Mount Albert forwards" along with Satherley and Shadbolt. Such was the easy nature of the win that the newspapers didn't bother to list most of their scorers. Herring scored a try in Mount Albert's 35–18 win against Manukau in round 1 of the Roope Rooster on September 4. He was "outstanding" with Satherley and Leatherbarrow. They were knocked out of the competition with a 21–10 loss to Ponsonby a week later with Herring, Gunning, and Satherley the "best of the forwards". Mount Albert's season finished with a 31–22 win over City and a 22–18 loss to North Shore in the Phelan Shield final. In a summary of the season the New Zealand Herald wrote that the Mount Albert "vanguard which was seldom altered, played very solid football. Herring, Shadbolt and Gunning were the outstanding trio and produced league football equal to the best seen in Auckland".

===== Auckland v NZ Māori =====
Herring was then selected by Hec Brisbane in the Auckland squad to play New Zealand Māori on October 9. When the final thirteen was chosen Herring was named at prop, with Bert Leatherbarrow in the other prop position and Joseph Gunning at hooker. They were opposed by a front row of Jack Tristram, Jack McLeod, and L. Cootes. However, on match day due to the unavailability of several players the forward were reorganised and Herring played in the second row alongside Angus Gault with John Anderson at lock. The loose forward for the Māori team were Jack Brodrick, George Mitchell, and Raymond. Auckland was well beaten 43–21 at Carlaw Park. Herring scored a try after good play by Bill Breed and Anderson in the first half.

==== New Zealand debut (1938) ====
The 1938 season was the most significant of Des Herring's career. He played 14 games for Mount Albert and was selected for Auckland, North Island, and New Zealand for their tour of Australia where he played four matches.

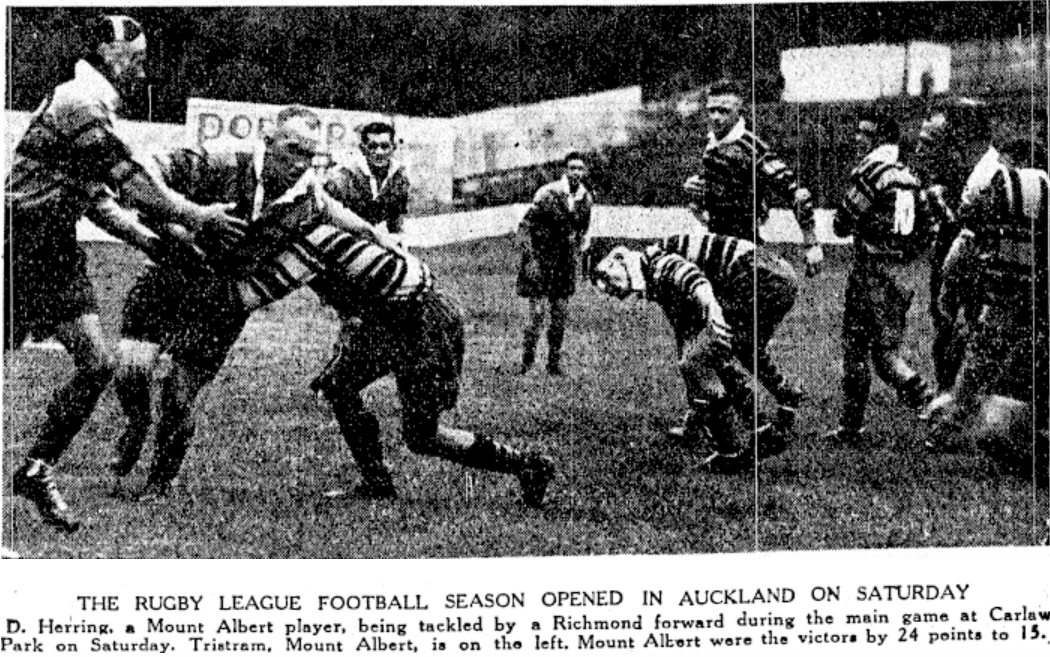

His first game of the year was for Mount Albert against Richmond in a preliminary round match on April 2. Mount Albert won 24–15 with Herring and Gunning "outstanding" in the forward. A photograph of Herring running with the ball appeared in the New Zealand Herald. The Herald noted that Mount Albert were fielding a very experienced forward pack which included Richard Shadbolt, Bert Leatherbarrow, Herring, Joseph Gunning, Jack Tristram, and Martin Hansen. Mount Albert beat Ponsonby 18–16 in their first Fox Memorial championship game on April 9 at Carlaw Park. Herring scored two of their four tries. Mount Albert were winning possession from the scrums early in the match and Herring "scored a nice try". It was said that "a great forward game was played by Herring. He was in everything and, besides scoring two tries, he made some fine openings, which should have provided points. Except for a tendency to go too far on occasions Herring's form was right up to international standard and, if he maintains it should have no difficulty in gaining New Zealand honours". The Auckland Star also sang his praises saying "Herring was the best forward of the match, and if he maintains his present form should be well in the running when a representative selection is made". They then beat Newton 25–18 with "most of the credit due to the forwards, who were led by Leatherbarrow and Herring". Working with Gunning the two of them "paved the way for Hansen to race for the line and a timely pass sent Leatherbarrow over". Herring "was the best forward on the ground and was very conspicuous in the final stages". In comments on the game the Auckland Star "the outstanding player was Herring. Last season Herring was a good forward. This season he has jumped into representative form. He was the inspiration of his side". In Mount Albert's round 3 loss to North Shore, 15–11 "Herring was the pick of the forwards" again. He also scored one of their tries and kicked a penalty. In an 18–13 win over Marist on April 30 Herring was "outstanding" along with Woods of Marist. Herring "continued to maintain his good form". "Woods kept Herring well covered, but nevertheless the latter played another fine game. He was unlucky to receive an injury to his leg in the second spell". He then scored a try in a 17–9 loss to Manukau on May 7. The word "outstanding" was used to describe him once more in a very physical game.

===== Auckland and North Island selection =====
Herring was unsurprisingly named in the Auckland team to play the Rest of the North Island on May 18 by selectors, Bert Avery, Hec Brisbane, and A. Renwick. He and Angus Gault were the props, with Jack Satherley at hooker. They were opposed by Joe Cootes (Wellington), W Brooks (South Auckland), and L. Lewis (Taranaki). The Auckland side thrashed their opponent 67–14 with Herring scoring one of their fourteen tries. Herring "proved a splendid opportunist, while he did his work well in the scrums". The Herald said "Herring and [Jack] McLeod look likely to be the two outside front-row forwards" and McLeod and Herring "appear certainties for inclusion in the New Zealand team". And went on to say "there is no better all-round forward in Auckland at present than D. Herring, Mount Albert. His safe handling and cleverness on attack always make him prominent, while he shirks nothing when it comes to the tight play".

When the North Island team was named there were twelve Auckland players chosen, with the only exception being Herring propping partner, Joe Cootes who was from Wellington. Jack Satherley was at hooker. The North Island selectors were Thomas McClymont, Hec Brisbane, and Gordon Hooker. The South Island from row featured George Orman (Buller), John Clark (Canterbury), and B. Barnard (Canterbury).

The North Island team proved far too strong for their South Island counterparts, winning 55–2 with Herring scoring three of their twelve tries. The Herald wrote "there was no better forward on the ground than Herring, but the remainder of the pack gave him good assistance". In the first half he was "associated in a good passing bout" with Walter Brimble, Harold Tetley, and Angus Gault. His first try came close to halftime with Jack Smith converting. Early in the second half Herring ruined a chance to score after holding on too long following a break by Wilfred Brimble. A while later however in a passing movement Herring combined with Walter Brimble and Jack Brodrick for Jack Satherley to score. Midway through the half Angus Gault passed to Herring who scored making the score 33–2, then towards the end Herring got his third, pushing the score out to 48–2.

===== New Zealand selection and tour of Australia =====
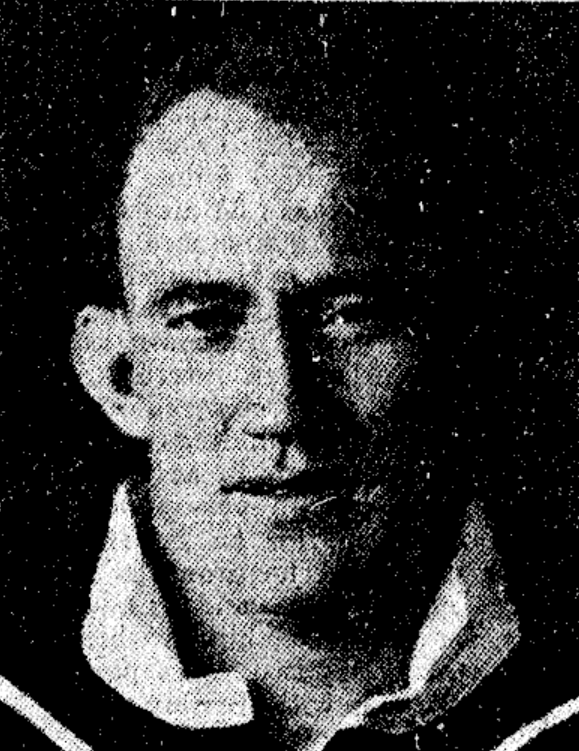
Des Herring

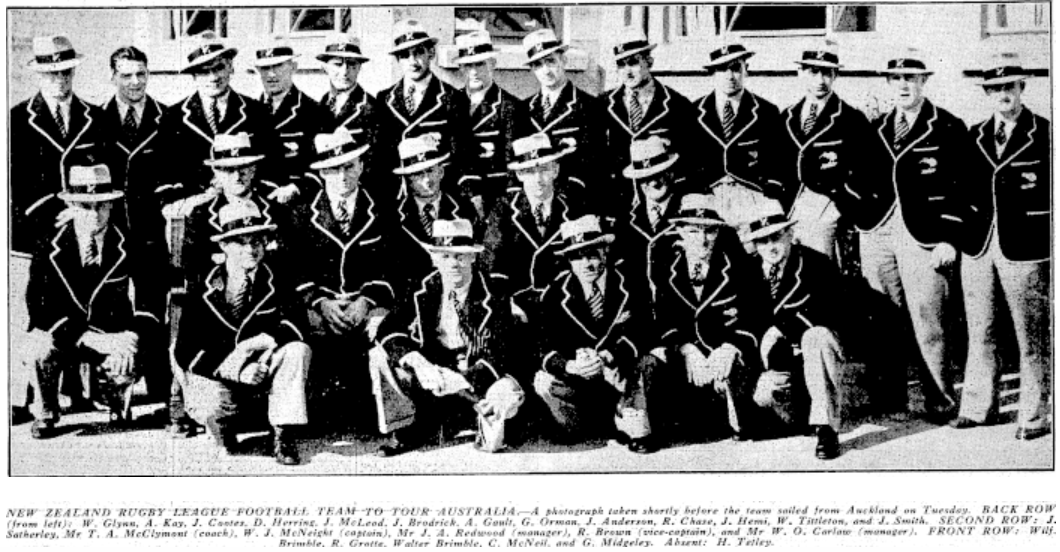
NZ Team 1938

Following the inter-island match Herring was selected by Hec Brisbane, Thomas McClymont, Jim Amos for the New Zealand team to tour Australia. The Herald said "Herring, who is 23 years of age, has proved one of the most prolific scorers in the game, and is expected to create a good impression in Sydney. In a profile on the players they also gave his weight as 14st 3lb and said "he is the most promising forward in the game" and "is a front-row forward, strong and rugged, and can handle the ball with the ability of a three quarter. Before departing Herring played one last game for Mount Albert against Richmond on May 28 and he kicked a penalty in their 29–7 loss. Herring was "the best forward" in the Mount Albert pack. The New Zealand team departed Auckland on board the Canadian – Australasian liner, Niagara on the evening of May 31.

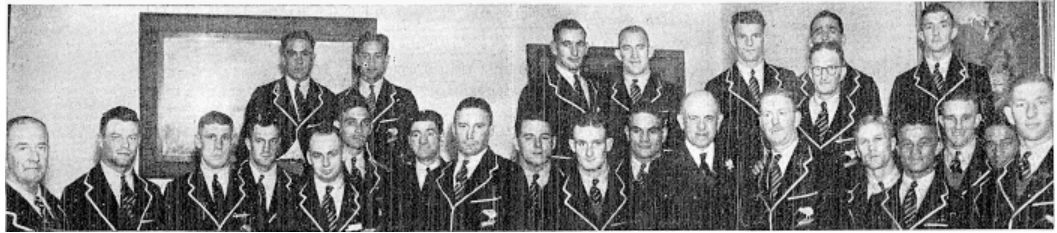
NZ team at a civic reception

The same day they were given a civic farewell by the Mayor, Sir Ernest Davis at the Auckland Town Hall at noon following a morning tea at George Court, Limited. While the night before they had a farewell ball at the Peter Pan cabaret.

It was said that "before the team left Auckland it was stated that Herring would in all probability play as a back-row forward, a position which is not new to him. Herring played good football last season as a third row forward". However, when the side was named for the first match against New South Wales on June 11 Herring was named at prop along with Bill McNeight, with Jack Satherley between them at hooker. They were up against Ray Stehr, Roy Kirkaldy, and Harry Porter. In player profiles in the Sydney Morning Herald it said that Herring was "strong and brainy, he can handle with the ability of a back, and is good both in the tight and the loose" with a portrait photograph of him appearing with the comments.

The first match was played before a crowd of 28,303 at the Sydney Cricket Ground and saw New South Wales win 25–12. New Zealand had been the better side in the first half, leading 8–3 at the break and having missed many chances to score, but an injury to Arthur Kay who was said to have been New Zealand's best back up to that point, meant New Zealand had to play a man short and New South Wales go on top.

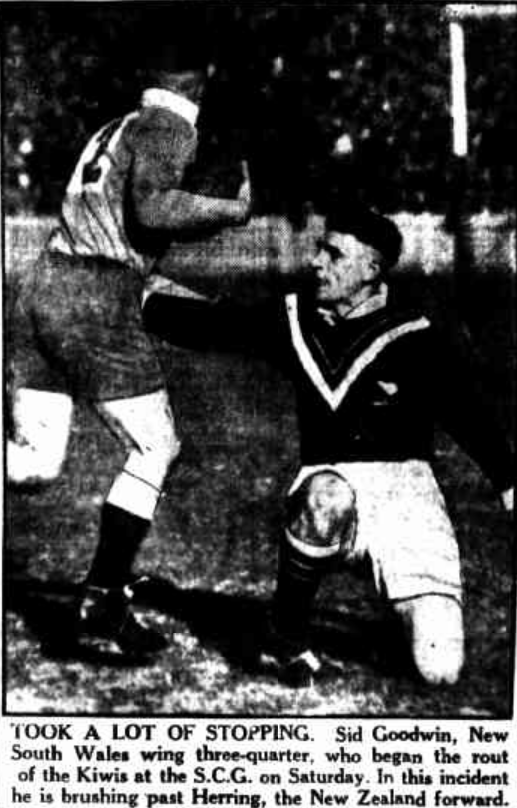

With the scores 3–3 midway through the first half the New Zealand forward made a down field rush "headed by Herring" and were awarded a penalty just outside the 25 with Jack Hemi kicking it to give New Zealand a 5–3 lead. It was said in the Sydney Morning Herald that "the New South Wales forwards indulged in questionable tactics on a few occasions, and earned the disapproval of the crowd. Pearce was "barracked" once when he barged with great force into McNeight and Herring, the New Zealand forward, and put them out of action for a while. The referee spoke to Pearce. The same newspaper commented that, in addition to McNeight's great game, "Gault, Satherley, Herring, and Tetley, played with considerable dash". New Zealand missed several chances to score and near halftime Herring almost got over and then Hemi missed an easy penalty as halftime arrived. The Auckland Star published the Daily Telegraph's comments on the match which said that Gault and Herring were "conspicuous" with Jack Brodrick being "the star". Another article wrote that the New Zealand side's "speed nonplussed the home backs, Brodrick, McNeight and Herring often combining with the three-quarters in dangerous rushes". And that Rangi Chase was the best back, and Herring and Brodrick the "outstanding forwards". The Referee newspaper wrote that "Brodrick second row, Gault not so tall, but solid and sound, Herring front row, and Tetley, lock, were most dangerous among a good, lively set of New Zealand scrummagers. They got a fair share of the ball in the first half, but not so afterwards". Along with Kay's injury there were several other players on the New Zealand side who suffered injuries with Herring mentioned as having "hurt his shoulder", possibly due to Pearce's running into him as it was mentioned that he was temporarily unable to play. A photograph of Herring attempting to tackle Sid Goodwin was published in The Labor Daily on the Monday after the match. For the rematch against the same opponent two days later Herring and Gault were both left out of the side from the forward, being replaced by Joe Cootes and Jack McLeod. New Zealand won the match 37 to 18.

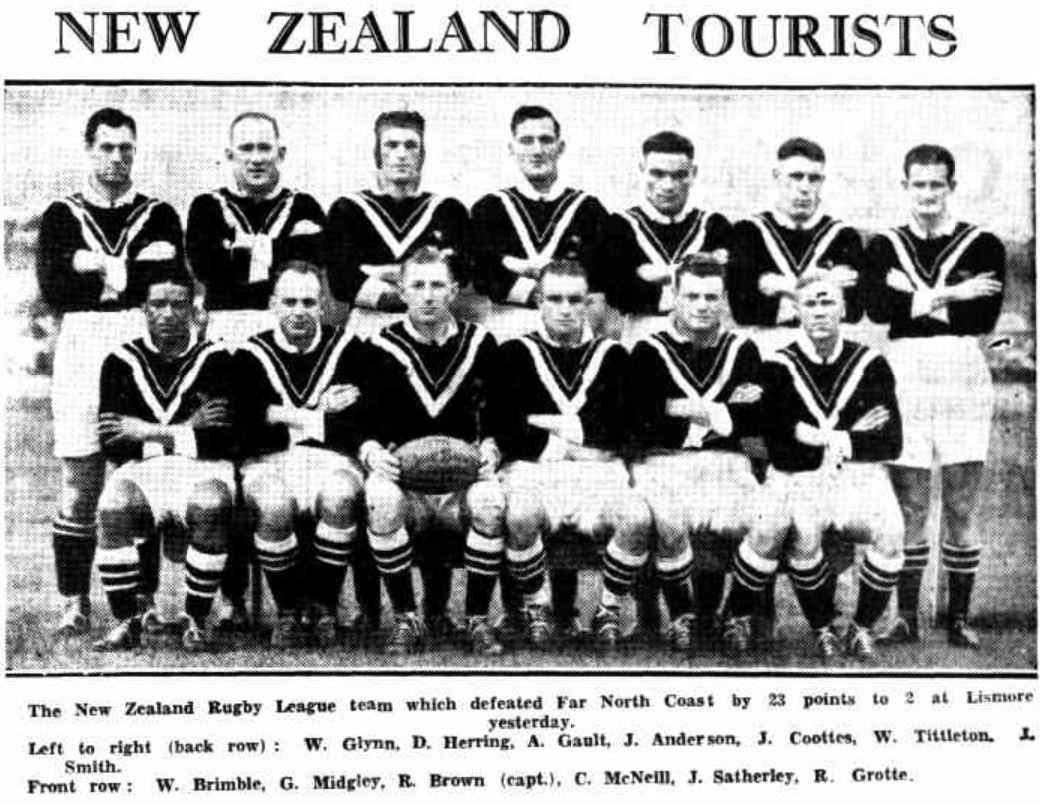
New Zealand RL team to play Far North Coast in 1938

Herring's next appearance was in New Zealand's third tour match against North Coast at Lismore on June 15 at prop. New Zealand was unimpressive against relatively weak opposition and won only 23–2 in wet conditions which made handling difficult. The Northern Star newspaper said "it was not uncommon in the second half to see J. Cootes, Glynn, Satherley and Herring in complete control of the ball, beating off the determined individual efforts of McLaren, Bond, Lever and Norton.

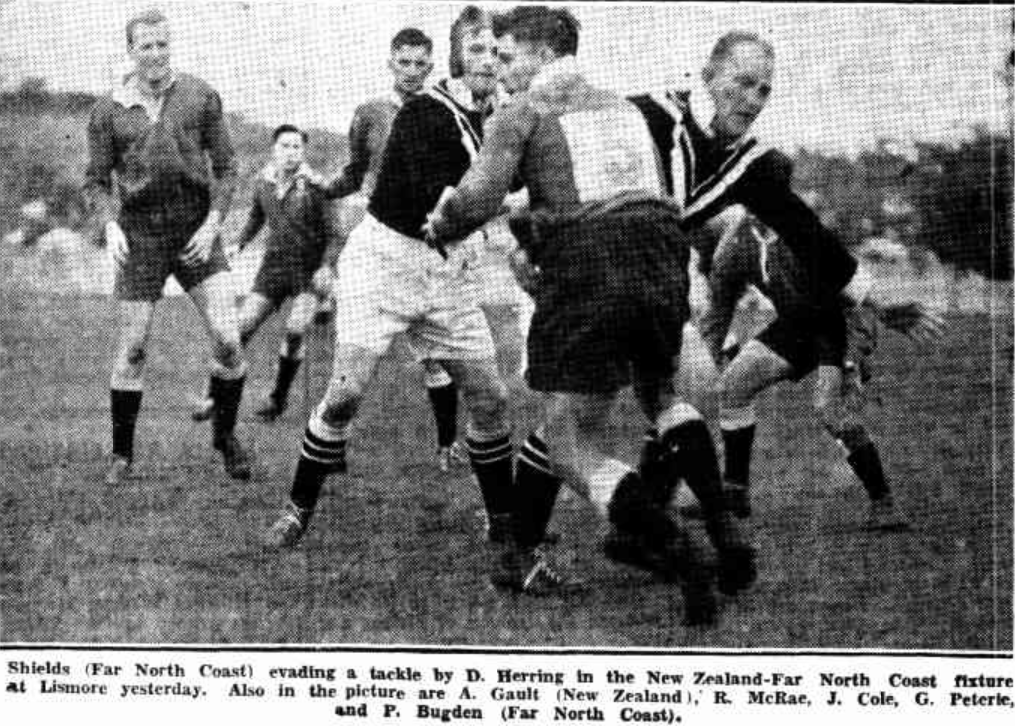

A photograph of Herring tackling W. Shields, the Far North winger accompanied the article.

In the lead up to New Zealand's match with Queensland on June 18 the New Zealanders were photographed at training with Herring in his Mount Albert jersey about to pass the ball to Angus Gault. Herring was ultimately left out of the side which went down heavily, 31–11 at The Gabba.

He was named in the second row for New Zealand's fifth match, against Toowoomba at the Athletic Ground on June 22. He was alongside McLeod, with John Anderson at lock. New Zealand narrowly won the match 12–11 before 2,500 spectators. New Zealand's "tackling was weak, as, with the exception of McNeight and Herring they were prone to go for the head instead of low". The Telegraph newspaper wrote that Herring "rigidly watched" Fred Gilbert, the Toowoomba captain and halfback. They joked that "on this particular day [he] was certainly not a "fish out of water".

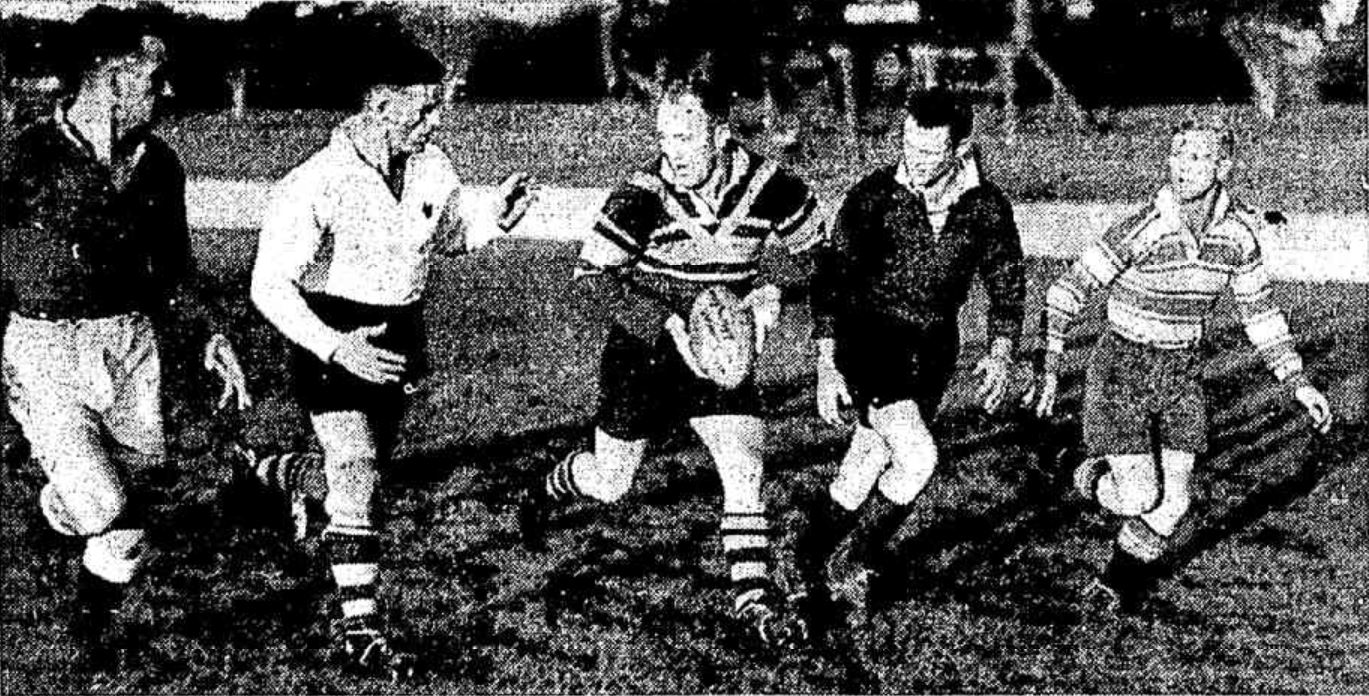
Herring passing to Angus Gault at training.

Herring was not chosen for the New Zealand match against Queensland on June 25 which they lost 21–12. It was mentioned that he was sitting among the crowd along with other New Zealand officials and non-playing team members. His final match of the tour was in their 7th game against NSW Group 4 on June 29 at Tamworth Oval in Tamworth. He was at prop, with Billy Glynn captaining the side in the other propping position and Jack Satherley at hooker. New Zealand won 26–15 though the match reports were relatively short and no team list on game day was published in the newspapers so it is possible that Herring didn't even play in the match. The only New Zealand forward mentioned were Billy Glynn, Jack Brodrick, and John Anderson. Herring did not play in the match with Newcastle and was named in the reserves for the final tour match against Sydney on July 6. The team then departed Sydney on board the Aorangi ship which arrived at Princes Wharf in Auckland on the morning of July 11. After their return the touring side played against Auckland at Carlaw Park though Herring was once again named in the reserves and did not play. The Auckland side won 21 to 13 on July 16.

===== Return to Mount Albert =====
After his return Herring rejoined his Mount Albert side for the closing stages of the Fox Memorial championship. He was named in their round 14 match against Richmond. Mount Albert won 11–3 with a wild pass from Martin Hansen to Herring in the first half cost them a certain try. It was reported that Herring "played well early in the game, but then received and injury". In their next match they were well beaten 31–5 by Manukau with Richard Shadbolt sent off among their forward. Joseph Gunning was said to be their best forward with Herring and Hansen giving him "good support". The next week Mount Albert beat City 28–13 with Herring converting three of their six tries and also adding a penalty. Herring sent Bert Leatherbarrow over for his try early in the second half. He "showed a return to his best form and was the pick of the Mount Albert forwards". The Auckland Star wrote that "Herring showed some of the dash and enterprise which won him a place in the New Zealand team".

In their last round match Mount Albert needed a win and a Marist loss to force a playoff for the title however Marist beat Newton 10–7 to seal the championship. At the same time on the number 2 field at Carlaw Park Mount Albert beat Papakura 44–12. Herring scored two tries and kicked five conversions and a penalty. He was "in splendid form" and was "always prominent" in their forward effort. In round 1 of the Roope Rooster, Mount Albert were beaten and eliminated 8–2 with Herring kicking their only points through a penalty. Herring, Hansen, and Gunning "tried hard to save the game, but could not pierce the defence. Mount Albert beat Marist on September 10 in round 1 of the Phelan Shield with Herring scoring one of their two tries. His point scoring continued in what turned out to be his final game of the season. Mount Albert were defeated 26–17 in the Phelan Shield semi-final by Manukau with Herring converting three tries and kicking a penalty. Of the Mount Albert forward Herring was "the pick" along with Gunning and Leatherbarrow.

==== Mount Albert, Auckland and Auckland Pākehā (1939) ====
The 1939 season saw Herring play 21 games for Mount Albert, scoring 6 tries and kicking 8 goals. He also made one appearance for Auckland and two for Auckland Pākehā. He also played in a New Zealand trial match. His selection in the New Zealand team in 1938 was noted at Mount Albert's annual general meeting at King George Hall in Mount Albert on February 20.

In a round 1 win over Papakura, 24–10, Herring kicked two conversions. He was "frequently in the picture" along with Hansen and Tristram. On April 12 Mount Albert played against a touring Sydney XIII side at Carlaw Park. Herring played at prop with Shadbolt the other prop and Leatherbarrow at hooker. They were opposed by Ray Stehr (Eastern Suburbs), George Watt (Balmain), and Frank Griffiths (Balmain). Mount Albert won the game 16 to 11 with Herring scoring a try and kicking a conversion and a penalty. The Mount Albert forward played very well with Shadbolt singled out and Hansen also prominent with Herring providing good support. He missed a penalty attempt early in the game but was successful with one soon after. Later in the half Bruce Donaldson and Martin Hansen made a break but Bert Leatherbarrow dropped the ball, however Herring "was on hand" and scored a try which he also converted. They then beat Newton 11–9 with Herring kicking a penalty. He was "often prominent, but spoiled a good game by dropping passes in an attempt to take them with one hand. Mount Albert was in excellent form to start the season and a win followed over Richmond, 9–0 before a comfortable defeat of Manukau 38–15 which saw Herring score three tries. He was one of the standouts among their forward. Then a week later in a 20–13 win over Marist Herring was again "prominent".

Mount Albert suffered their first defeat when they lost in round 7 to North Shore by 15 to 12. Herring lost a try when he tried to score himself on the North Shore line.

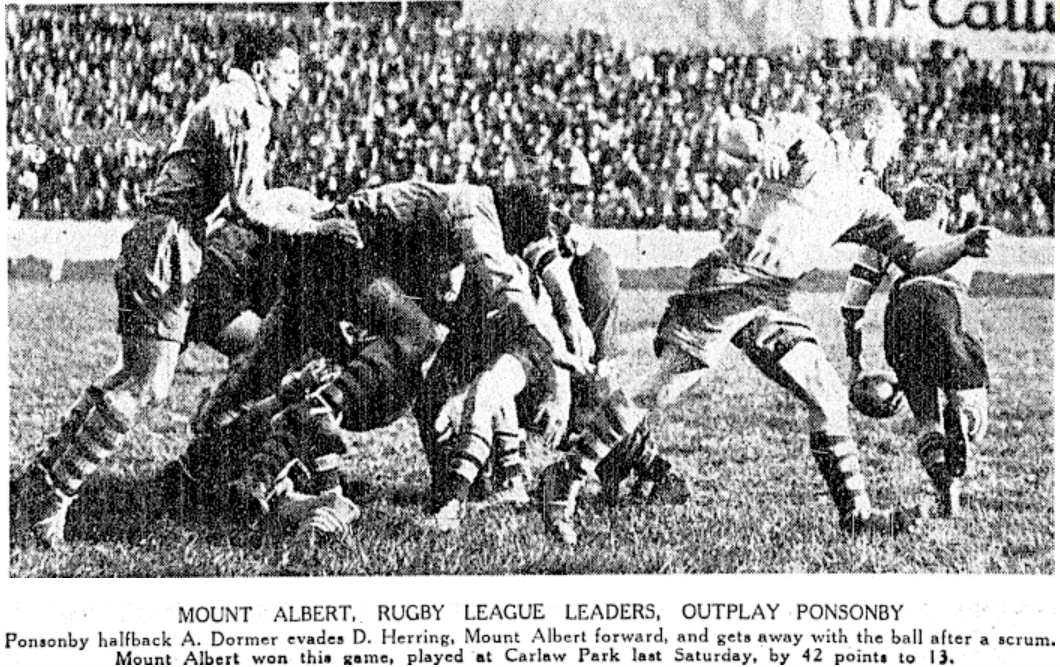
Ponsonby halfback Wilfred Dormer evading Herring.

They beat City 18–7 and then in a 42–13 win over Ponsonby he and their other forward were said to have played "splendid games" with Herring kicking a conversion.

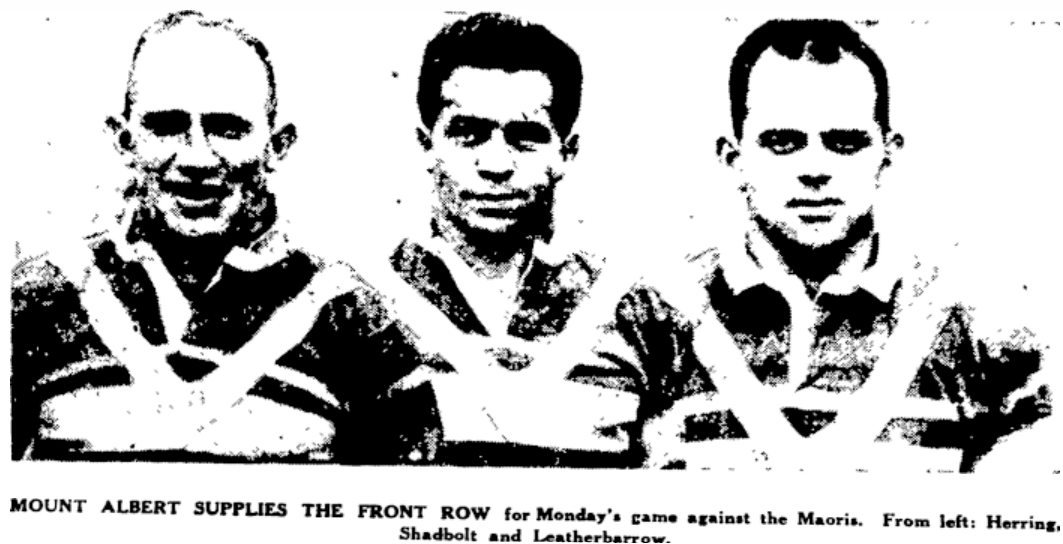
Des Herring, Richard Shadbolt, and Bert Leatherbarrow, the Mount Albert front row in 1939.

A photograph of the Mount Albert front row which included Herring, Shadbolt, and Leatherbarrow appeared in the Auckland Star on May 30. The significance of the photo was that the three of them would make up the Auckland Pākehā front row for their match with Auckland Māori on June 5. Another photo was published in the New Zealand Herald following Mount Albert's win over Ponsonby which showed Herring breaking from a scrum to chase the play.

===== Auckland Pākehā v Auckland Māori =====
Herring was chosen in the Auckland Pākehā team to play Auckland Māori. Auckland Māori won 19–15 with Herring converting one of the three tries for the losing side. He and Shadbolt both played "fine games". He nearly scored early in the match but Roy Nurse threw a forward pass to him. In the second half Peterson made a break and passed to Herring who gave it to Ivor Sterling who sent it to Bob Banham who scored between the posts with Herring converting.

In a round 10 match between Mount Albert and Papakura Herring scored a try in the 13–13 draw. The match was played at Prince Edward park in Papakura. His try came after teammate, captain/coach Bob Banham kicked and Hoskin failed to hold the ball with Herring scoring between the posts. He kicked a penalty in a surprise 21–7 loss to Newton on June 17. They then beat Richmond 11–6, Herring converting one of their three tries.

The North Island selectors, Thomas McClymont, Hec Brisbane, and Gordon Hooker selected the side to play in the inter-island match and also a Probables and Possibles match was arranged as curtain raiser. However Herring was only chosen in the reserves for both teams. He came on at halftime for the Probables side in their 31–17 win, replacing Jack McLeod. In his time on the field "brilliant work by Roy Hardgrave, Joseph Gunning and Herring" led to Gunning scoring a try.

===== Auckland selection v South Auckland (Waikato) =====
Herring was then selected in the Auckland side to play South Auckland (Waikato) on August 5. He was prop along with club teammate Richard Shadbolt with Huck Flanagan of Marist at hooker. Auckland win 26–17 at Carlaw Park with Herring scoring one of their six tries. He "played to form" along with Shadbolt, Cameron and Gunning in the forward. He "played a good game" and early in the game "weak tackling by the visiting backs almost let Herring over, but a forward pass to Shadbolt checked the movement". At the start of the second half Clarrie Peterson "raced away and Cameron and Flanagan handled before Herring scored wide out".

===== Mount Albert, Fox Memorial champions =====
Mount Albert beat Manukau and Marist (24–15) to all but seal their first ever Fox Memorial championship. Early in the second half with Mount Albert trailing 7–6 Jack Tristram "led a rush by the Mount Albert pack and Herring scored". Then with Marist back in the lead, 15–14 "Herring should have been tackled by either [Jimmy] Chalmers or [Gerry] Hughes before he passed to Hardgrave, who scored" giving them the lead with ten minutes to go. In details of the missed tackle on Herring the Herald later wrote "but for waiting for the whistle when Herring made a dash after receiving an obvious forward pass, Marist would have held the lead. Both Chalmers and Hughes anticipated a stoppage for the breach, and only partially checked Herring".

With an 8–0 win against North Shore on July 29 Mount Albert secured their first championship title. Herring was "prominent in the loose" for the winners. In comments on the side the Auckland Star said "good although the backs were, the forwards have been relatively better, and in Shadbolt, Herring, Gunning, and [Walter] Cameron there were forwards up to the best representative standard". There was no mention of Herring in their final round match against City on August 19, or their 8–0 win over Newton in round 1 of the Roope Rooster competition a week later. He was said to have "played well" in the forward in a 22–21 Roope Rooster semi-final win over Richmond on September 9. Mount Albert was unable to add the Roope Rooster trophy to its championship win with a 13–11 loss to Marist in the final. Gunning was their standout forward but Herring and the others gave him able support. A week later the same sides met in the champion of champions match for the Stormont Shield. Mount Albert won easily 21 to 9.

===== Auckland Pākehā v Auckland Māori =====
Herring's final game of the season was for Auckland Pākehā against Auckland Māori on September 30. The Pākehā side won 15 to 12 with Herring scoring a try and kicking a conversion. The Herald wrote that Petersen and Gunning were the best of the forward "while Herring also played a good game".

==== Final Season (1940) ====
The 1940 season turned out to be Herring's last. It was said that he would once again be available for Mount Albert in an article in the Auckland Star on April 15. He remarkably would have only just turned 25 years of age. Herring was named in a 19-man team list for their opening championship game on April 20 however he was listed towards the end meaning he is unlikely to have played. There were several times when he was named in the team lists in the Fridays preceding games and on more than one occasion a Herring was named in the 1st grade side and the reserve grade side suggesting a relative was also playing at the club. His first confirmed appearance of the season came in their round 11 win over Manukau 19–5. He came on to replace the injured Flower and was among the "hardest toilers" with Gunning and Leatherbarrow. He was back in the starting side and scored two tries in a 24–7 win over City the following week. He "played well" and, he Gunning and Leatherbarrow "shone in the forwards". Then in a 17–16 loss to Marist on August 3 he "performed creditably" with Leatherbarrow and Tristram. Herring was named in the starting team lists for games against Newton (August 10), Ponsonby (August 17), and Papakura (August 24) but there was no mention of him in any of the match reports and he was not named in their sides for their final five matches of the season.

At the start of the 1941 season Herring was named in a 24 player Mount Albert senior squad but he did not play in any matches for them and his rugby league career had come to an end.

In September 1941 Herring was named in a New Zealand Rugby League Old Boys' Association team to play their South Auckland counterparts on September 27. Nineteen players were named so it is unknown if he took part in the match. Ironically Herring was only aged 26 by this time while most of the others named were in their 30s with some close to 40 years of age.

== Personal life ==
It was reported that 17-year-old Desmond Herring was in a vehicle accident on the morning of June 10, 1932 on Hobson Street. Herring was driving a "light closed van" which collided with a milk lorry. The van tipped over and its framework "collapsed" on Herring and Royston Carlson. Herring suffered bruises and cuts with Carlson uninjured.

In 1936 Herring married Joyce Hatcher. Their wedding took place at St Patrick's Cathedral in Auckland on August 19. They were living at 150 Richmond Road in Grey Lynn in 1938 and working as a carriage contractor. In 1941 around the time of his retirement from playing he was still living on Richmond Road however he was now living with his parents, Edward and Mary, at 232 and working as a contractor. The 1942 New Zealand Gazette for military purposes had his address as 8 Patey Street in Remuera. The 1943 electoral records showed that Herring was still living with his parents at the same address and was working as a contractor. On February 27, 1944, Des and Joyce had a son, Lloyd William Herring at Nurse Millar's. They also had a daughter named Sharon.

From the mid-1940s until the mid-1950s Herring continued to work as a contractor and was living with his wife Joyce at 4 Margot Street, Epsom. They then moved to 47 Wapiti Road in Epsom around 1957 with Herring working as a carrier. He and Joyce remained there until the late 1960s, and lived there with daughter Joyce and son Lloyd.

It appears that Des moved to Australia in October, 1969 before returning to New Zealand in October 1972. After his return he continued to live at 47 Wapiti Ave in Epsom where they remained for decades through to his retirement in the late 1980s. Prior to his retirement he was employed as a "sawdust splr". Children Joyce and Lloyd were living with them post retirement in the early 2000s.

Des died on March 21, 2006, aged 91 at Epsom on the Park in Epsom.
