= Joe Cootes =

New Zealand rugby league footballer

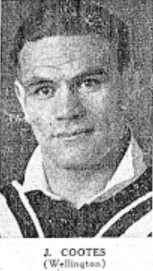

Personal information
- Full name: Joseph George Cootes
- Born: 1914
- Died: unknown

Playing information
- Height: 5 ft 10 in (1.78 m)
- Weight: 87 kg (13 st 9 lb)
- Position: Prop, Second-row
Club
Years	Team	Pld	T	G	FG	P
1941–43	Manukau
Representative
Years	Team	Pld	T	G	FG	P
≤1936–≥39	Wellington
1936–39	New Zealand	4	1	0	0	3

Joseph George Cootes (1914 – after 1949) was a New Zealand professional rugby league footballer who played in the 1930s who was three-fourths Māori. He played at representative level for New Zealand, and Wellington, as a prop or second-row.

== Playing career ==
=== International honours ===
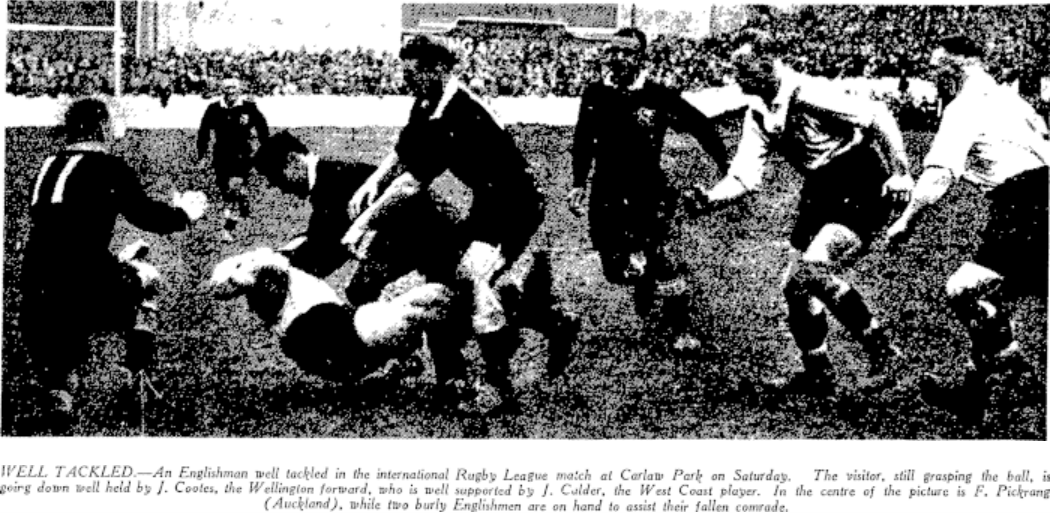
Cootes making a tackle in the first test against England, August 1, 1936 at Carlaw Park.

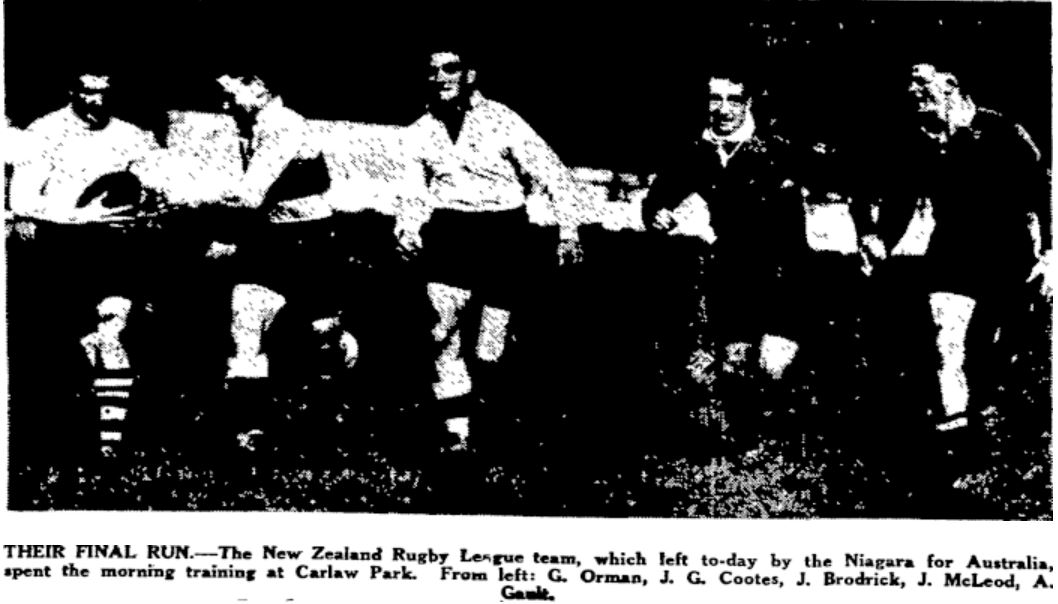
Cootes, 2nd from the left, training for NZ at Carlaw Park before they departed for Australia in 1938.

Cootes represented New Zealand in 1936 against Great Britain (2 tests), in 1937 against Australia (2 tests), and on the 1938 New Zealand rugby league tour of Australia and 1939 New Zealand rugby league tour of Great Britain and France.

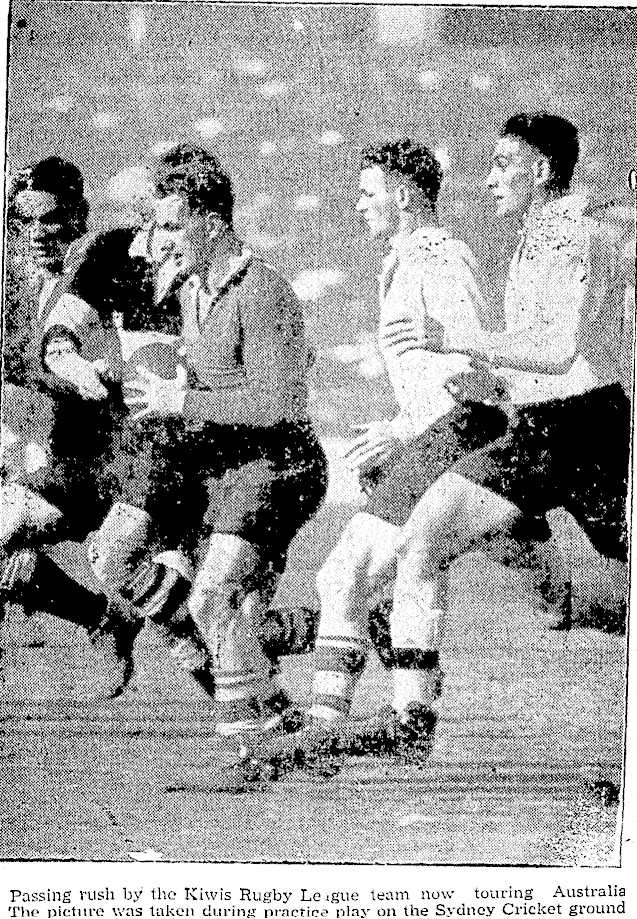
Joe Cootes at training for New Zealand at the Sydney Cricket Ground in June 1938. He is on the extreme left.

== Later life ==
Cootes later worked as a labourer. He was convicted of assault in 1937 and 1939, serving two weeks in gaol for the second conviction.
