= Aorangi (ship) =

A number of ships have been named Aorangi, after Aoraki / Mount Cook (Maori:Aorangi):

- SS Aorangi (1893)
- MV Aorangi (1924)
