= Cliff Satherley =

New Zealand international rugby league and union player

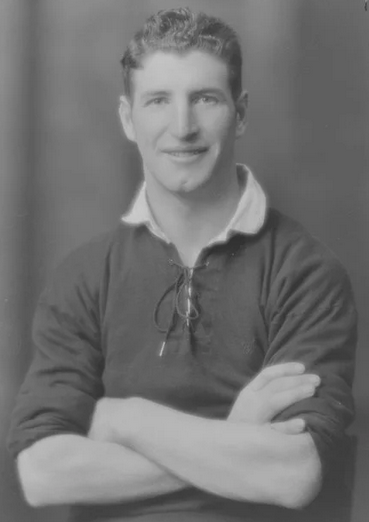

Personal information
- Full name: Clifford Allan Martin Satherley
- Born: 4 June 1907 Wairau, Marlborough Region, New Zealand
- Died: 7 January 1947 (aged 39) Wellington, New Zealand

Playing information
- Weight: 13 st 6 lb (85 kg)

Rugby union
- Position: Number eight, Lock
Club
Years	Team	Pld	T	G	FG	P
1926–30	Manukau Rovers	63	5	2	0	21
1931	Ponsonby	11	1	0	0	3
1932	Technical Old Boys (AKL)	1	0	0	0	0
1932	Marist Brothers Old Boys (Hawkes Bay)	11
1938–39	Papamoa	12	1	7	0	21
1938–39	Te Puke (sub union)	15	2	11	0	33
1939	Te Puke trial	1	0	1	0	2
1940–41	Frankton Railway	8	2	11	0	36
1940–42	Hamilton (sub union)	2	0	3	0	7
1942	Technical Old Boys (Hamilton)	9	0	5	0	12
	Total	133	11	40	0	135
Representative
Years	Team	Pld	T	G	FG	P
1928–30	Auckland B	9	1	0	0	3
1929–31	Auckland	18	6	0	0	18
1932	North Island	1	0	0	0	0
1932	Hawke's Bay	6	2	7	0	22
1939	Bay of Plenty	1	0	0	0	0
1940	Waikato	3	0	1	0	2

Rugby league
- Position: Second-row
Club
Years	Team	Pld	T	G	FG	P
1933–36	Richmond Rovers	61	19	78	0	213
1936–37	Mount Albert United	18	1	38	0	79
1943	Richmond Rovers	1	0	0	0	0
	Total	80	20	116	0	292
Representative
Years	Team	Pld	T	G	FG	P
1933–35	Auckland	12	4	18	0	51
1934–35	North Island	2	1	2	0	7
1935	New Zealand	3	0	4	0	8
1935	Auckland Province	1	0	0	0	0

Coaching information
Club
Years	Team	Gms	W	D	L	W%
1937	Mount Albert United (RL)	20	13	1	6	65
1938–39	Te Puke (RU)	6	1	1	4	17
1940	Frankton (RU)	14	9	1	4	64
	Total	40	23	3	14	58
- Relatives: Jack Satherley (brother)

Clifford Allan Martin Satherley (4 June 1907 – 7 January 1947) was a rugby league player who represented New Zealand in three test matches against Australia in 1935. In the process he became the 232nd player to represent New Zealand. Satherley also played for the North Island representative side along with Auckland. He played his club rugby league for Richmond Rovers and Mount Albert United. He also played representative rugby union for Auckland, Hawke's Bay, Bay of Plenty, and Waikato. His rugby union clubs were Manukau Rovers, Ponsonby, Marist Brothers Old Boys (Hawke's Bay), Papamoa (BOP), Frankton Railway (Hamilton), and Technical Old Boys (Hamilton). He also played representative matches for the Te Puke and Hamilton sub-union representative sides.

== Early life ==
Clifford Allan Martin Satherley was born on June 4, 1907, in Blenheim. His parents were Ingress Cecilia Manson, and Charles Herbert Satherley. His mother had been married previously to Soren Hansen however she petitioned for divorce in February 1904. They had two children together, Sorine Elvine Hansen (b.1897) and William Claus Hansen (b.1900). The Star (Christchurch) newspaper reported from the proceedings that "when fifteen years of age, in 1897, she married [Hansen] at Wellington, with her parents' consent, her father being present at the marriage. Respondent was alleged to have led a drunken life. Two years after the marriage her husband came home and said he "had had enough of her, and was off". Since then she had seen nothing of him. He was reported to be in Dannevirke, but inquiries failed to find him. She was ill after his desertion, and her baby [Sorine] 14 months old, died. Justice Cooper remarked upon "criminal conduct of parents in consenting to such early marriages"; a girl didn't know her own mind at fifteen, and she was not fit to bear children. Petitioner had not, at the time of her marriage, even reached the maximum school age”.

She remarried Charles Herbert Satherley in 1905. They had three children, Clifford, Phyllis Ida (1909-1986), and Leslie Charles John Manson (1910-1994). Leslie was more commonly known as 'Jack', and he also represented New Zealand at rugby league in 1937 and 1938.

== Playing career ==
=== Rugby union ===
==== Boys’ Institute Club (Wellington) and Oriental Club ====
In the early to mid 1920s Satherley was living in Wellington and a player at the Boys’ Institute Club. The Boys Institute was a boarding school for young boys that was founded in 1883 and became located on Tasman Street in 1914. He was a member of the fourth grade side and played as a five eighth before moving to the wing forward position. He also played lower grade rugby for the Oriental Club before moving to Auckland.

==== Manukau Rovers ====
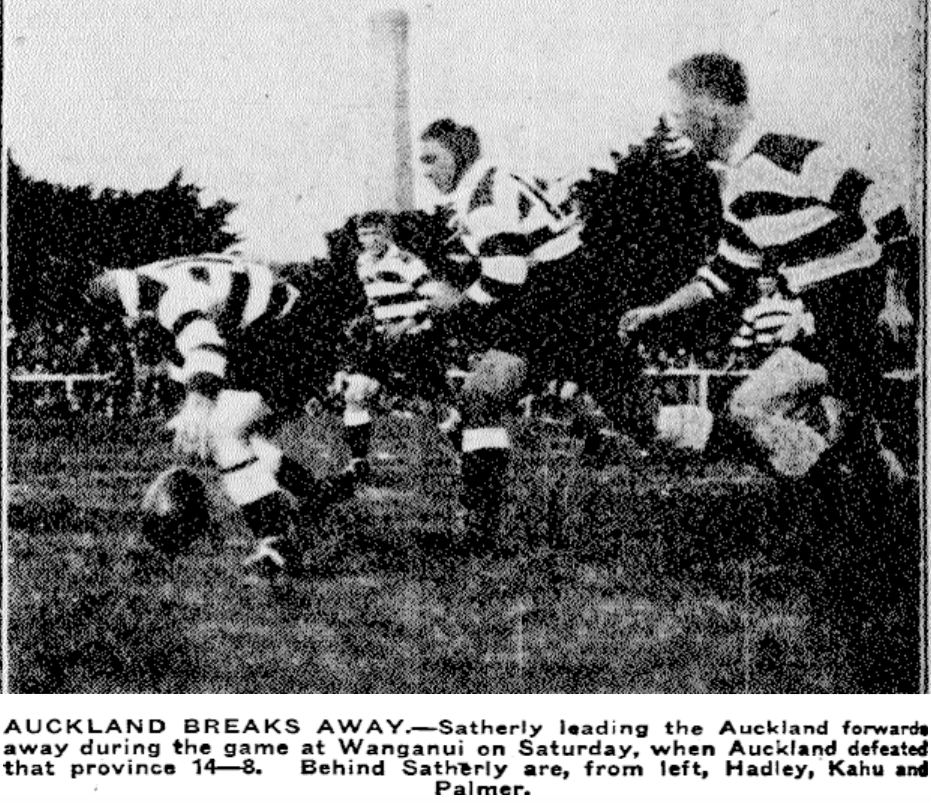
Satherley playing for Auckland against Wanganui in 1930

When Satherley moved to Auckland he joined the Manukau Rovers club which at that time was based in the Onehunga area. He made his senior debut for them in the Pollard Cup on September 25, 1926, at the age of 19. The Pollard Cup was played for near the end of the season and was often seen as an opportunity to try out junior grade players prior to the following season. He played against Grammar Old Boys in a 9–8 loss which eliminated them from the competition.

He began the 1927 season promoted to the senior side ‘full time’. Manukau were based in the senior B grade which was effectively the second division in Auckland rugby senior competition. After their opening game of the season against Newton on April 30 it was said that “Housham (their captain), Brimble and Slatherley were the pick”. His name was misspelled and over the years newspapers would often spell his surname incorrectly as ‘Satherly’ as well. In a May 21 match Brimble (a brother of future Kiwi internationals Ted Brimble, Wilfred Brimble, and Walter Brimble), and Satherley were again mentioned as being “seen to advantage in the forward rushes”. Manukau would eventually go on to finish runner up to City in the senior B grade. Following the conclusion of the championship competitions the Pollard Cup knockout tournament was commenced. Satherley's only try of the season came in their round 1 win over Grammar Old Boys 19 to 8 at Onehunga. Manukau went on an incredible run with Satherley playing in all matches, by beating Grafton, Patumahoe (in a friendly match), Otahuhu, University, Marist (by default), and Technical Old Boys in the final at the Showgrounds. This was the first time in the competition's history that a team from the B grade had won the Pollard Cup. Satherley ended up playing 18 senior matches for Manukau over the course of the season. On November 21 they held their annual prize giving at the Orpheum Hall in Onehunga and Satherley was presented with a medal for the most-improved player in the senior team. That was not the only thing Satherley was singled out for late in the year. On October 12 he was fined 10 shillings by the Police Court for failing to attend drill training along with several other men. Failing to attend had become so common that the judge said “we cannot fine all these people, and it would be better to have the old defaulters’ camp back again”.

The 1928 season saw Satherley play 16 games and score 1 try for Manukau. His side had been promoted to the A Grade based on their previous years strong form and ultimately finished 3rd in the championship. He was mentioned as being one of the best forwards after a July 14 match against Ponsonby he was mentioned as being one of the best forwards on the field and the Auckland Star published a small photograph of him. His form was good enough to earn selection in the Auckland B team to play South Auckland (based in Waikato) on July 21 however he was a reserve and did not take the field. After the July 28 match with Grammar the Auckland Star reported “every man rose to the occasion, the best of them being that great toiler, C. Satherly (sic), who, being on his holidays, came up from Nelson to play in the game. Then in August he was named as a reserve for the Auckland B team to play Bay of Plenty however he was then named to play in the loose forwards. Auckland B won the match 19 to 14 at Eden Park in front of a crowd of 7000. Two weeks later he was chosen in the reserves for the Auckland B match against Thames at Thames but not take the field. The following week he made the starting line up for the Auckland B match to play South Auckland at Pukekohe. Auckland thrashed their opponents 46-11, though seven of the selected South Auckland side had not shown up so it was a makeshift team. Early in the match “Satherley sent Weir away” on a run

==== Auckland selection ====
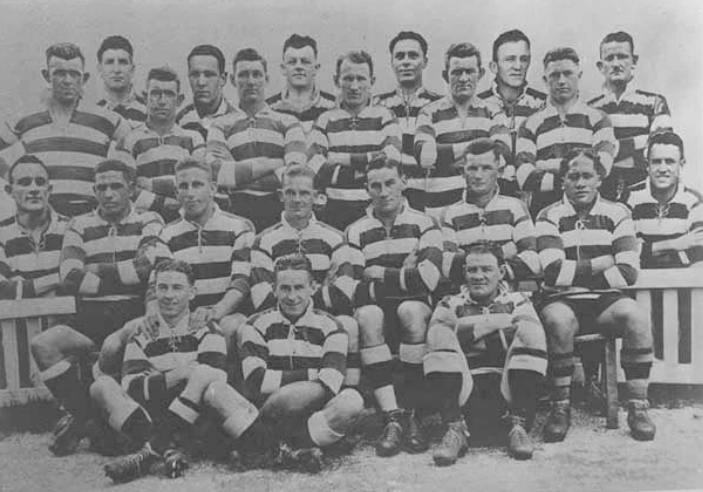
The Auckland team of 1929 with Satherley in the extreme back row on the left.

The 1929 season saw Satherley make the full Auckland team for the first time. He played 14 matches for Manukau and scored a try in a match against Marist on May 4, and a week later he kicked the first goals of his career which were both penalties in a match against Ponsonby. He did not take on regular goal kicking duties until a few years later. Against Marist it was said “Satherley was easily the pick of the forwards till he retired in the second quarter with a dislocated finger. His try was a beauty”. He had “bustled Walsh and scored beneath the posts”. Around this time his younger brother Jack was also being named in the senior side.

Satherley was then selected to play for the Auckland B team in several matches against Thames Valley on August 3, Thames on August 10, and South Auckland on August 17.

There was controversy surrounding his selection for the Thames Valley match. Satherley by this time was captaining Manukau to start the season, Albert Falwasser had taken up a contract to play rugby league in England for Wigan. Satherley was not originally selected for Auckland B and Roy Schnauer was an emergency player. It was reported that Satherley had signed with the Marist old Boys rugby league club according to Schnauer who had “happened to meet Satherley, who was looking for the rugby union office”. Schnauer was extremely angry at not being chosen after Linton pulled out of the side and said “I am disgusted with the way I have been treated by the Auckland Rugby Union”.

Satherley then made his first Auckland A side when he was chosen to pay in their August 24 match with North Auckland. The match was played at Dargaville on August 24 and saw Auckland triumph 15 points to 9. Satherley scored a long range try after Auckland took the ball past the half way line which “enabled Satherley to put up a remarkable performance. For a forward to run half the field with defending backs in vain pursuit, is something unusual in representative football, but such was the feat of the Manukau player, who, downed within two feet of the line, had sufficient reach to place the ball across the chalk”. Satherley then played in the B team against Thames on the Thames High School field on August 31 and was said to be “prominent” in their 19–17 win.

He was then selected to travel south with the Auckland side to play against King Country at the Domain in Taumarunui on Wednesday 4 September. Auckland won 17 to 6 with Satherley playing in the loose forwards. They then travelled to New Plymouth to play Taranaki at Pukekura Park. Taranaki won 14 to 11 before a crowd of 5000. With the home side leading 11-3 Satherley “sent his backs away in a movement which ended in Charlie Cammick scoring a neat try for Auckland”. His final match of the season came for Auckland B against South Auckland. Auckland won 11 to 9 at Pukekohe. At Manukau's annual prize giving on November 23 at the Orpheum Hall in Onehunga, Satherley was presented with his representative cap. Then on January 16 he was presented with his Auckland blazer at an event held by the Auckland Rugby Union.

In 1930 Satherley was captaining the Manukau side despite being only 23 years of age. He had moved to Putāruru but remarkably intended to make the trip to Auckland every weekend to play. He ultimately played 15 matches during the season which was once again punctuated by several representative games. He played 12 matches for Manukau before being selected for Auckland B to play South Auckland on July 12. He had been in very good form for Manukau and against the strong Ponsonby side on May 24 the Auckland Star reported “C. Satherley was a splendid example to his team, and it was his try in the first spell that gave them heart”. Against South Auckland at Pukekohe before a crowd of 700, Auckland B lost 12 points to 6. Satherley scored one of Auckland's two tries after Hira mis-fielded a kick and Satherley gained possession and crossed the line. It was said that he and Donald were “the only two forwards who worked really hard”. A week later Satherley again played for Auckland B, this time against King Country. The match was played at Eden Park and was a curtain-raiser to the match between Auckland and the touring British side. Satherley's B team thrashed King Country by 46 points to 13. He was involved in Auckland's first try after he made a break with Potter and they scored soon afterwards.

Satherley then made the Auckland A side for the first time in the season will he was pulled into the team as there were 5 Auckland players away with the New Zealand test team. The match was played at Eden Park which was described as a “quagmire” with a controversial 6-6 draw resulting. The journalists at the time said that the referee awarded a goal from a mark to Taranaki when the ball had clearly gone under the bar. Satherley was said to have “toiled hard” along with Arthur Knight, Angus Finlayson, and Swin Hadley, and they were “a lot in the limelight”. He was then chosen for the Auckland team to tour the North Island to play matches against Wanganui, Manawhenua, Wellington, Bush Districts, and Hawke's Bay. Auckland beat Wanganui 14 points to 8 with Satherley, Hadley, Knight, and Finlayson once again singled out as being the “pick of the pack”. Nevertheless the less Satherley found himself on the reserve bench for the match on August 20 against Manawhenua at Palmerston North. He also missed selection in their match with Wellington at Athletic Park on the 23rd. Wellington won 16 points to 15.

Satherley was chosen in the team to play Bush District and scored a try in a 27–7 win at Pahiatua on 27 August. Following the match the players went to a boxing tournament held by the Pahiatua Boxing Club at the Foresters’ Hall. Satherley in fact stepped in the ring and fought his team mate Watty Jones. They weighed 12.7st and 13st respectively with the Manawatu Standard stating “neither had any knowledge of the fistic art other than an instinctive desire to punch, and fists were flying in the air and descending from all directions. Satherley got home with the greater proportion, Jones's windmill swings, which would have felled an ox, luckily sailing over his opponents head. They set to like a couple of champions in the last round, Jones emerging from a hectic session with a bleeding nose and a grin and Satherley with the verdict and a bigger grin”. Following this fight other team mates Jock Barnes and Arnold Berridge also fought with Barnes winning by knockout and then Arthur Knight and Angus Finlayson fought a wrestling match. The final game of the tour was against Hawke's Bay at McLean Park in Napier. Auckland won by 8 points to 6 in front of 5,000 spectators. Several players left the field injured including Satherley who went off late in the match. After the Auckland side returned to Auckland Satherley was chosen in the reserves for their match against Wairarapa. His final match of the season came in a championship match against University on September 13.

==== Move to Ponsonby ====
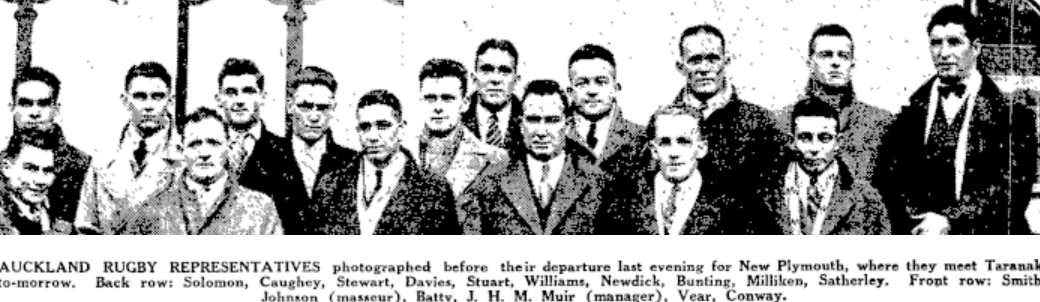
Satherley on the extreme right in the Auckland team to visit New Plymouth to play Taranaki in 1931.

Prior to the start of the 1931 season Satherly transferred from Manukau to Ponsonby. The reason is unknown though was possibly due to moving address. His address through much of the 1930s was 235 Ponsonby Road. He went on to play 11 matches for them during the season and scored 1 try which just so happened to be in a May 16 match against his old Manukau team, though Manukau won the match 9 to 5.

He was picked in the Auckland training squad to play against Waikato on June 3. The match was played at Rugby Park in Hamilton with Auckland winning 22–11 after trailing 0–11 at one point. Satherley scored 4th try out on the left wing which had pushed the score out to 18–11. After 5 more matches for Ponsonby he was chosen in the side to travel to Napier to take on Hawke's Bay in an earthquake benefit match. Auckland lost 19–8 in front of 6,000 spectators at McLean Park. It was said that Anderson, Walter Batty, Knight, and Satherley “were the most prominent of the visitors’ forwards”. While the New Zealand herald said Satherley was “prominent for his persistent following up”. The team returned to Auckland and Satherley was named in the team to play Southland at Eden Park. Auckland won 6 points to 5 on a heavy ground He then travelled with the Auckland side to New Plymouth for their match against Taranaki. Auckland lost 11 to 9 on a “well cut up” ground. Satherley scored a try which put Auckland into the lead 9-5 after taking a pass from Milliken who “threw infield to Satherley, who shook off a high tackle and scored”. The Herald said that he was “always prominent” and “splendid in the loose”.

Satherley then played in a ‘return match’ against Waikato at Eden Park on August 15. Auckland won 17 to 8. The Herald reported that “Satherley played a very fine game against Waikato, [and] he was perhaps the outstanding forward”. A week later on August 22 he again played for Auckland in their match against Hawke's Bay at Eden Park. Auckland over turned their loss to the same opponent a month earlier with a 19–14 win. The following weekend Auckland played their annual match against Thames and Satherley scored from a “line-out movement” to put Auckland in front 18-14. They went on to win 28-17. A week later Satherley played in an 18-6 loss at Eden Park to the visiting Otago side.

Satherley was then chosen in the Auckland side to travel to Whangārei to play North Auckland at Rugby Park. Auckland were well beaten by 22 points to 8, though Satherley managed to score a try after a “good run by Stacey” just after halftime which with the conversion had narrowed the score to 11-8, though the home side ran away with the match. The Northern Advocate said that “Satherley, Stone and Stacy were most often in evidence” during the match. Auckland's final representative match of the season was played at Eden Park against Wellington. In sunny conditions before a large crowd Auckland won 27 points to 19. After Auckland had taken a 3–0 lead “Satherley took the kickoff and cut the defence to ribbons and a try seemed certain until a poor pass spoiled the movement”. Later in the first half with Auckland ahead 6-0 he “broke clean away from the line-out, but with two players in support delayed his pass and a certain try was lost”. The Auckland Star reported that “the best Auckland forwards were batty. Knight and Satherley”.

==== Move to Hawke's Bay, and North Island selection ====
At the start of the 1932 season Satherley transferred to the Technical Old Boys club in Auckland. In a pre-season match on April 16 for them against Eden at Gribblehurst Park he was admitted to Auckland Hospital after suffering a twisted knee. The Auckland Star reported just 4 days later that he had moved to the Hawke's Bay.

He joined the Marist Brothers Old Boys club and played approximately 11 games for them during the season however there were few newspapers in the Hawke's Bay region and almost no coverage of the club competition. Marist finished runner up for the championship behind Napier High School Old Boys. In late May the Hawke's Bay union nominated him for the North Island team. He was chosen for the North Island side on May 30 and had reportedly “been going great guns in Hawkes Bay”. This form must have been based on his club form as the Hawkes Bay representative side had not played any matches to this point in the season. The North Island v South Island match was played at Lancaster Park in Christchurch on June 4. The North Island won 28 points to 10 in front of 14,000 spectators. The Press (Christchurch) reported that “C. A. Satherley, of Hawke's Bay, was often prominent, and is a young forward of whom more should be heard”. Following the match the New Zealand team to tour Australia was selected however despite 13 forwards being named Satherley missed out.

In July Satherley was chosen to make his Hawke's Bay representative debut against Wairarapa at Memorial Park in Masterton. The match was played on July 16 and saw Wairarapa win 14 points to 12. Two weeks later he played for Hawke's Bay against Auckland at Hastings. There were 4,000 present to watch Hawke's Bay lose 10 points to 8. Satherley scored after securing possession from a scrum where he was playing at the back, “and raced over, but failed to convert”. His try had given his side an 8-5 lead but Auckland scored a converted try and held on for the win. On September 3 he played for Hawke's Bay against Taranaki at Pukekura Park in New Plymouth. Hawke's Bay lost 23 to 18 with Satherley converting 2 tries and missing another. They then travelled to Palmerston North to take on Manawhenua on September 7. Hawke's Bay won 30 to 21 with Satherley scoring a try and kicking 4 conversions. Then on September 17 Hawke's Bay hosted Wanganui in Napier. Hawke's Bay won 10 points to 8 with Satherley kicking a penalty which had given his side a 6–3 lead on a water logged ground. Hawke's Bays final representative match of the season was against Wellington on September 24 in Wellington. Wellington won 16 to 11 with 4000 spectators on hand at Athletic Park. Satherley was said to be a “regular live wire in the loose” and was involved in several attacking movements. He also kicked a penalty goal just before halftime which had made the score 11-8 to Wellington. This was to be his last appearance in a Hawke's Bay uniform as he moved back to Auckland at the end of the season.

=== Rugby league ===
==== Move to Richmond Rovers rugby league club and Auckland selection ====
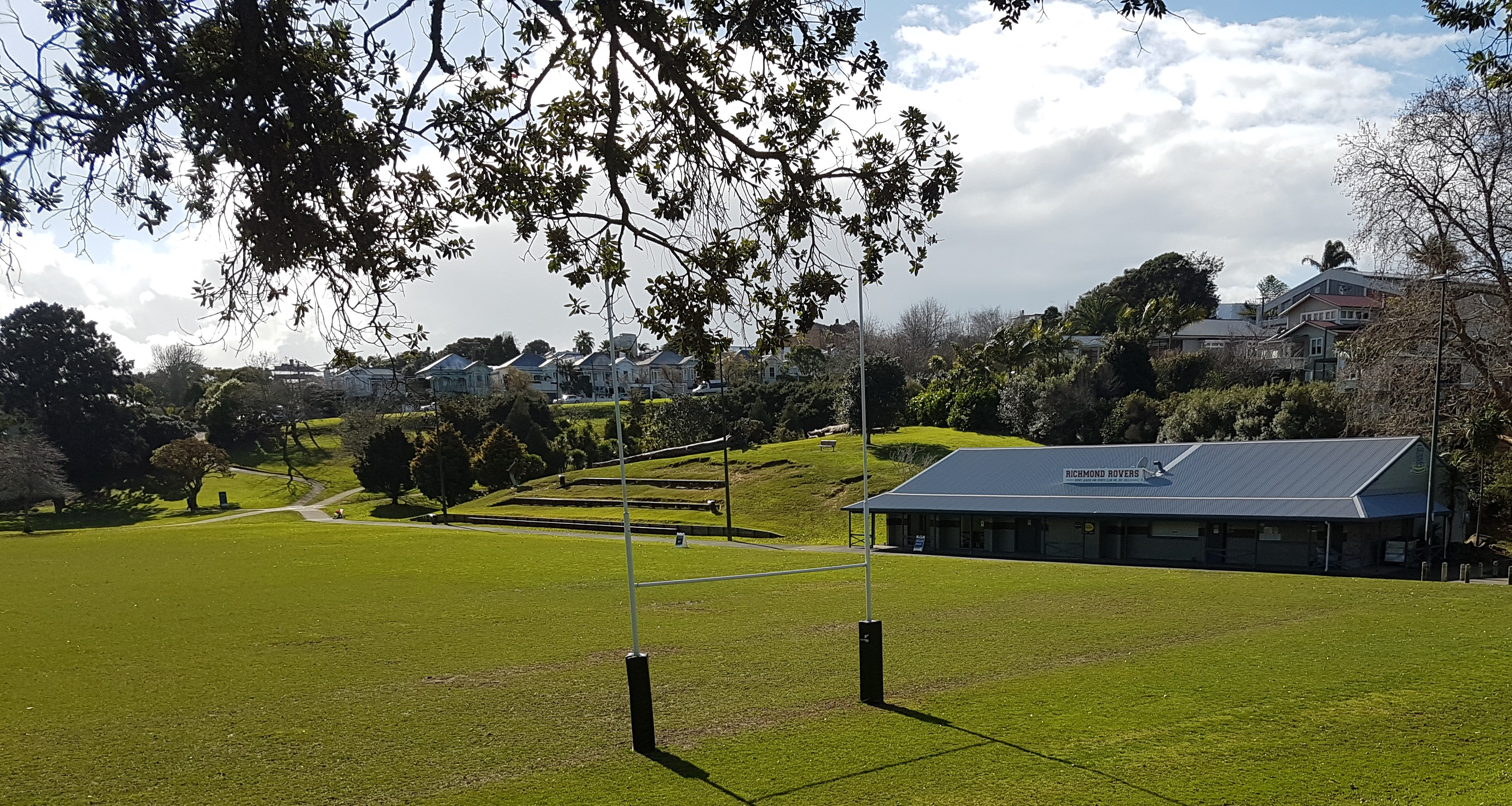
Richmond Rovers RL club and grounds where Cliff Satherley played from 1933 to 1936.

After returning to Ponsonby in Auckland Satherley switched codes and joined the Richmond Rovers Rugby League Club. Richmond were a particularly strong club at this time and their ranks were full with current and future New Zealand internationals. He made his debut for them in a May 6 round 2 match against Ponsonby United on Carlaw Park's number 2 field. Richmond lost 14–13 and it was said of Satherley: “in his first outing this sturdy forward, though slightly puzzled by the play-the-ball rule, linked up well in the second row with [Ray] Lawless”. Following a match against Marist Old Boys (a club he had been rumoured to be joined several seasons earlier) on May 27 it was said how well he was playing. The New Zealand Herald reported that “two of the finest forwards at present playing the code are included in the Richmond vanguard – Lawless and Satherley,… Satherley has quickly adapted himself to the new code. With a little more experience he should go a long way in the game. Satherley is equally at home whether in the tight or loose play”. His first points for Richmond came in a match against Newton Rangers on June 3. He was involved in several attacks and set future New Zealand coach Bill Telford up for a try. His own try came when he secured possession in the loose and scored between the posts. He converted another try scored by Telford in the second half as Richmond won 18 to 10.

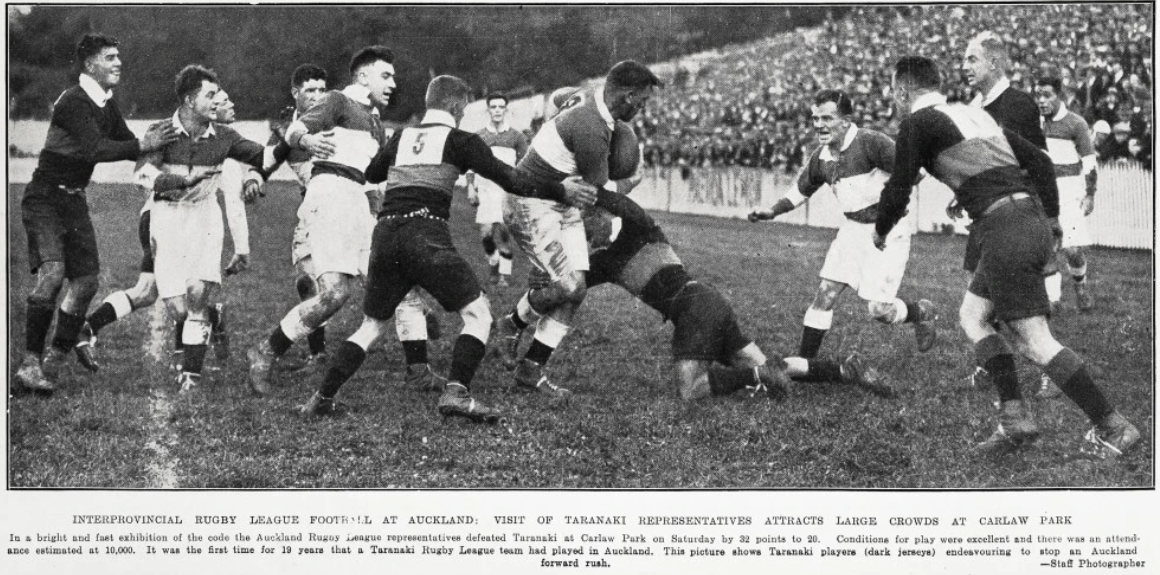
Satherley in support, face partially obscured during the match against Taranaki on June 10.

Satherley's form was impressive enough to gain selection for the Auckland team to play Taranaki at Carlaw Park. The selectors (Ernie Asher, William Mincham, and Bert Avery) originally chose a squad of 18 to go into training but Satherley made the match day team. He was selected in the second row alongside Jim Laird, with Lawless at lock. Auckland won 32–20 before a crowd of 10,000 with Laird and Lawless said to be outstanding and ably supported by Satherley and Leatherbarrow. The Herald said Satherley was “outstanding for all-round play”. In Richmond's final championship match of the season against Marist on July 8 Satherley was said to be one of Richmond's best forwards and the same day he was named in the Auckland side to play South Auckland The match was for the Northern Union Challenge Cup with the holders South Auckland hanging on to it with a 14–0 win at Carlaw Park. Satherley was then picked in the side to play North Auckland at Carlaw Park.

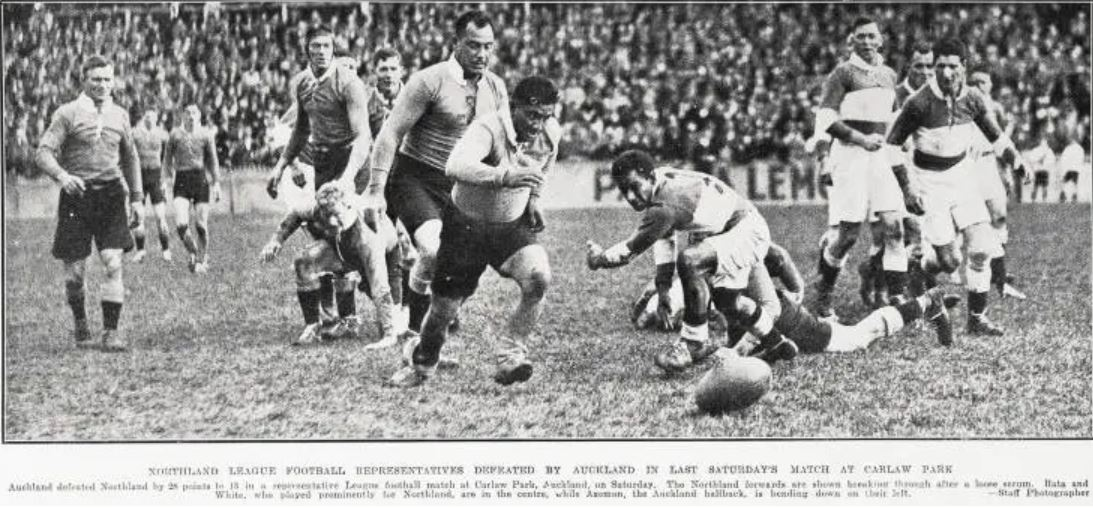
Satherley following up on the right, with team mate Vincent Axman turning close to the ball. The Northland players are W Rata and behind him, C White.

Auckland won 28 to 13 with Satherley chasing a kick and sending Alan Clarke and he also scored the final try of the match. He was said to be “the pick of the pack” along with Clarke.

On August 19 he played in Richmond's Roope Rooster final win 26-16 over City Rovers. He scored 2 tries and was said to be “the real leader of the Richmond van, and the best forward on the ground”. A week later he was selected in the Auckland side to take on West Coast at Carlaw Park on August 26. Auckland won a close match 28 points to 23 with Satherley scoring in the first half. His try came when he chased a kick and the fullback Martyn “fumbled a long clearing kick” which Satherley gathered and ran in to make the score 13-5. On September 2 he played in Auckland's 47 to 17 win over Hawke's Bay at Carlaw Park. He scored a try late in the match after a forward movement. Following the match he was selected in the team to play South Auckland on September 9. Auckland won 17 to 5 with it reported that Satherley along with Leatherbarrow, Donald and Bill Telford were a “good quartet of packmen”.

Satherley next played in Richmond's Stormont Shield final loss to Devonport United on September 16. Their next match was against the touring St George side from Sydney who had finished runners up in the NSW competition. Richmond won the match 13 to 8 with Satherley scoring a try and kicking a penalty. The match was particularly brutal with the Auckland Star reporting “deliberate kicking and punching were indulged in, and the climax was reached when two opposing players stood over the side-line on the terrace and fought”. Satherley's try came early in the second half “amid great excitement” to give them a 5–2 lead while his penalty “from long range” later on pushed them out to 13-5 in front. The Star said “Satherley and Lawless were perhaps the best on the field. They played vigorously, and never gave their opponents a moment's peace”. On October 7 the ARL organised a match between Richmond and Marist to try and find the 'best club side in Auckland' for the Max Jaffe Cup. Richmond thrashed their opponent 31 to 8. Satherley had a field day scoring a try, and kicking 3 conversions and 2 penalties. He was also involved in 2 other tries after making a break which eventually resulted in Tony Milicich scoring, and later passing to Stan Prentice who then scored. He was said to be the “best forward on the ground” with his “clever play” leading to at least three tries. Their final game of the season came in a rematch with St George. The game was notable for Satherley because his younger brother Jack had joined Richmond and was making his debut due to Lee being unavailable at fullback. It was said he “had good credentials”. Richmond once again were victorious in a tight match in wet weather by 5 points to 3. Cliff Satherley was said to have been outstanding in the forward pack and he converted Milicich's try.

==== North Island selection ====
The 1934 season was a particularly busy one for Satherley in a Richmond jersey. He played 20 matches for them, scoring 7 tries and kicking 19 goals for 59 points. He scored 51 of these in first grade matches which placed him as the 3rd highest scorer in Auckland. Following a round 3 match against City Rovers in which he had scored 3 tries the New Zealand Herald said “there is no better forward in the code than C. Satherley, the former North Island rugby representative. By clever foot work Satherley scored a brilliant try against City, and his following-up and clean handling rewarded him with two more tries”.

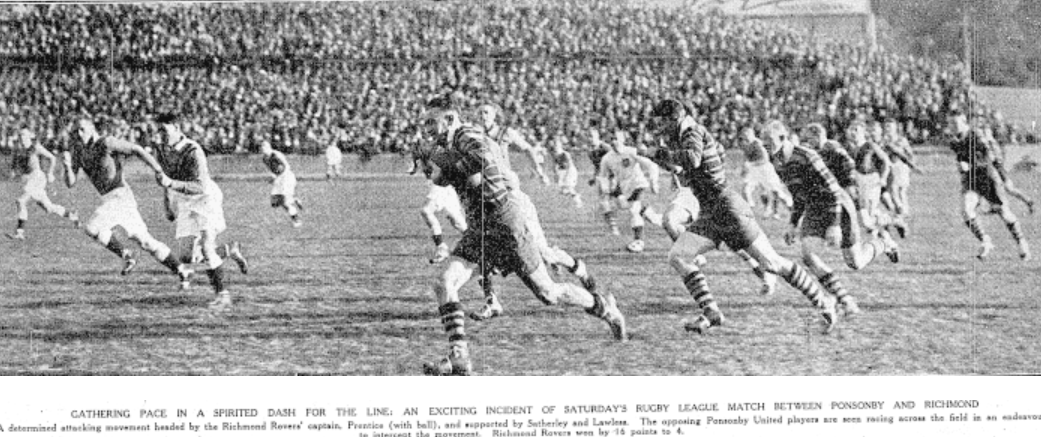
Satherley supporting Stan Prentice after a break in a match against Ponsonby at Carlaw Park on May 12 before a crowd of 17,000.

Satherley was selected for Auckland to play Taranaki on June 30 and kicked 2 conversions in a 35–8 win at Carlaw Park. Satherley was “outstanding” along with Lawless. In August Richmond went on a 2 match tour of Taranaki and Hawke's Bay. On August 9 they took on Taranaki at Western Park in New Plymouth and lost narrowly by 23 points to 22 with Satherley kicking a conversion. They then travelled to Napier where they beat Hawke's Bay side 37 to 11 before returning to Auckland. Prior to their departure Richmond had secured their first ever Fox Memorial title when they won the 1934 first grade championship finishing with 11 wins and only 2 losses (22 points), comfortably ahead of Newton Rangers in second with 16 points. In late August Satherley was named by Thomas McClymont in the North Island side to play the South Island. It was reported that he was at the top of his form along with Lou Hutt and Alan Clarke. The North Island won the match before a crowd of 9,000 at Carlaw Park by 36 points to 18 with Satherley scoring one of Auckland's 8 tries. He scored after the ball rolled clear from a scrum and he “was across in a flash to touch down for a simple try” to give the North Island side a 16–13 lead. The Auckland Star reported that Satherley was “outstanding” though the Herald noted that he “at times tried to go too far before passing”.

Satherley's remaining games in the season were all for Richmond. The first was in the Roope Rooster final against Marist where he kicked 2 conversions in a 20–13 win. He was named in the Auckland side to play South Auckland on September 8 but he had a slight injury so was put on “stand by” for the match and was not required. Richmond then played the New South Wales champion club side Western Suburbs and before an enormous crowd of 15,000 at Carlaw Park Richmond won 18 points to 16. Satherley converted one of Richmond's tries and after the match was described as part of an “indomitable trio for Richmond” which also included Lawless and Telford. A week later the 2 sides met again and Richmond were victorious once more 10 points to 3 before 13,000 spectators. Satherley was again mentioned as being a “shining light” along with Lawless and Alf Broadhead. Richmond then capped a truly remarkable season by beating Newton Rangers in the Stormont Shield final by 21 points to 5 with Satherley setting up Harold Tetley for their first try and then converting it and then 2 others later in the match. Richmond became the first team in Auckland Rugby League history to win the Fox Memorial first grade championship, the Roope Rooster knockout trophy and the Stormont Shield for champion of champions.

==== New Zealand selection ====
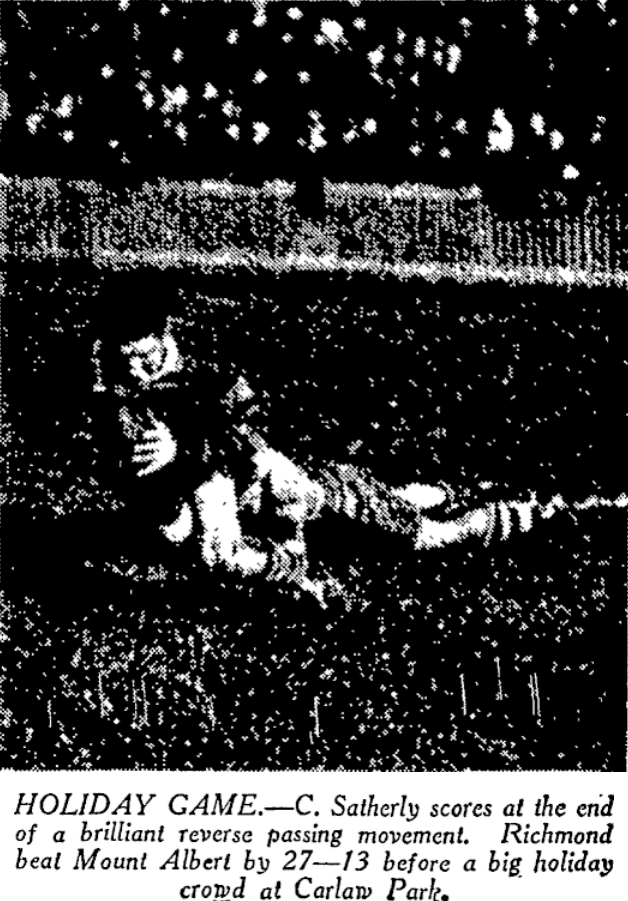
Scoring for Richmond in their round 2 win over Mount Albert.

The 1935 season was to be the most notable of Satherley's career. In Auckland rugby league competition he played 16 games for Richmond, scoring 5 tries and kicking 39 goals for 93 points with 85 in club competitions. This was the most of any player in Auckland for the season. He also made 5 appearances for Auckland scoring a try and kicking 16 goals for 36 points which was the most of any Auckland representative player. Satherley also made his New Zealand debut when he appeared in all three test matches against Australia.

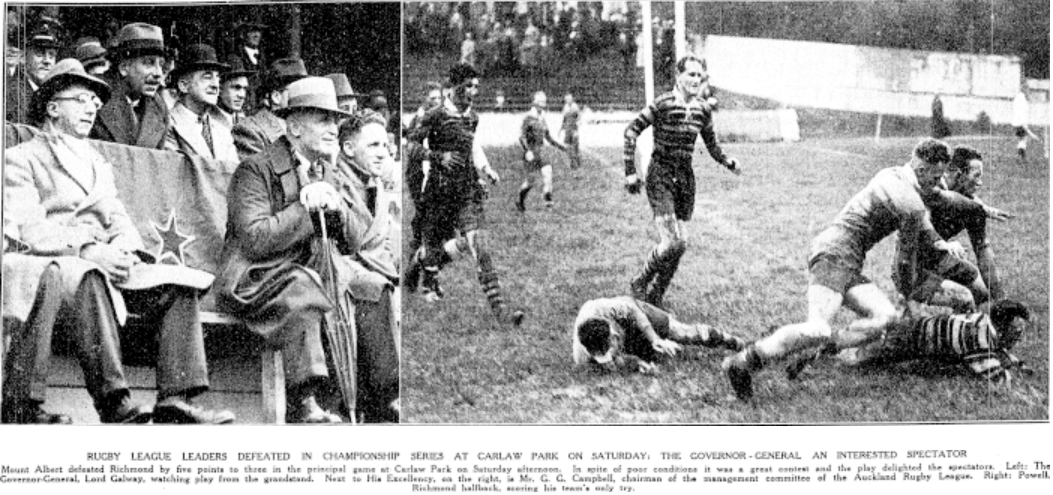
Satherley on the left covering across and watching Roy Powell score for Richmond in their 22 June game at Carlaw Park against Mount Albert.

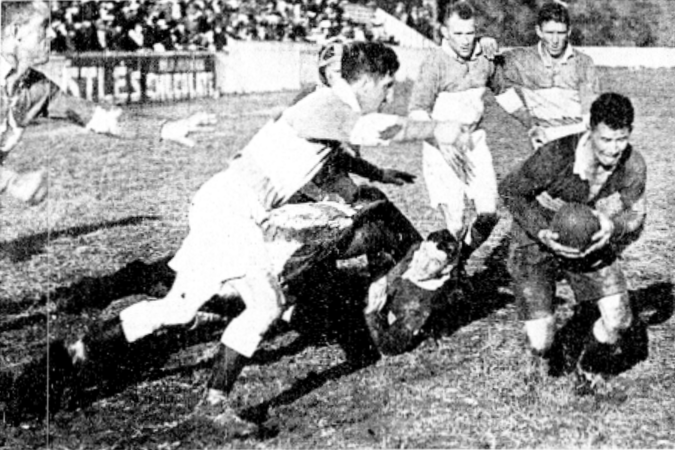
Coming across to tackle Tamatea in Auckland A's 37-14 win over Taranaki.

He began the season playing 12 matches for Richmond and had taken on the goal kicking duties much more regularly. After their second round match the Herald reported that “Satherley continues to be one of the best goal-kickers seen for some years. In two matches Satherley has kicked twelve goals in seventeen attempts – a good record for a forward”. On July 20 Richmond played Wellington at Winter Show Stadium in Wellington as they had a round 13 bye that weekend. Richmond won easily by 32 points to 4 with Satherley converting 4 of their 8 tries. After round 14 had been completed Richmond found themselves tied for first with Mount Albert United and a playoff was required to find the champions on August 10. However the week prior the Auckland team was selected and played a match with Taranaki on August 3. Auckland won 37 to 14 with Satherley scoring a try and converting 3 tries. He was said to have been “a tower of strength to Auckland. He was never far away from the ball, and usually up with the play, whether it was fast following up or backing up that was required”. He and Lou Hutt were “the best of the Auckland forwards, and gave a fine all-round display”. Richmond then played their championship final against Mount Albert and were victorious 14 points to 9 to secure their second consecutive title. Satherley converted a try and kicked 3 penalties.

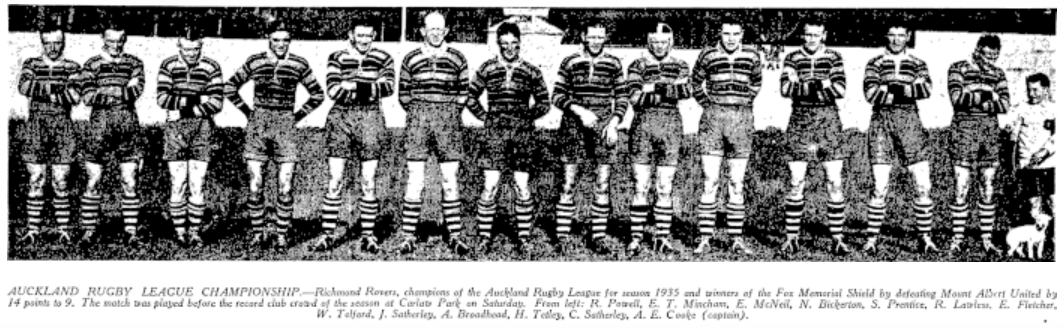

He was then selected to make his second appearance for the North Island team in their annual fixture against the South Island with his weight reported at 14 stone (89 kgs). On a wet Carlaw Park field the North Island won 19 to 18. Satherley provided “honest hard toil from bell to bell” along with Hutt, Large, and Laird. He converted two of the North Island's tries scored by Hutt and Bert Cooke. The Herald reported that Satherley “was the outstanding forward”. They also stated that he along with Hutt and Tetley “must be considered” for New Zealand selection to play the touring Australian side.

Satherley then played in round 1 and semi final Roope Rooster wins where he kicked 4 conversions against Devonport United, and 1 conversion in the match with Mount Albert. He was however to miss the Roope Rooster final loss to Newton Rangers and also the Stormont Shield final win over the same opponent as he had gone away with the Auckland side. They played three matches on their tour.

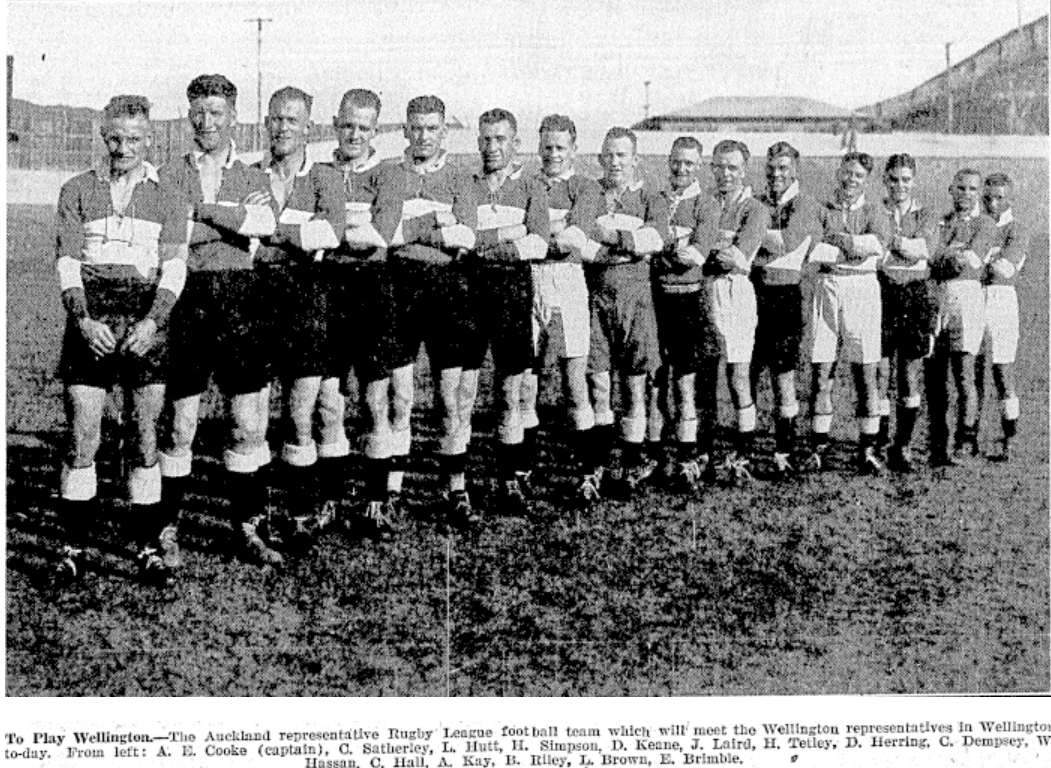

The first was against Wellington on September 7 with Auckland winning 39 to 27. Satherley had a field day with the boot converting 6 tries. He was said to be “always in the picture”. Four days later he kicked 3 conversions in Auckland's defeat of the West Coast 32-14 in Greymouth. They then journeyed to Christchurch to play Canterbury at Monica Park on September 14. Auckland again won with a 26–13 score line and Satherley found the posts with 4 successful conversions. On September 16 the Auckland selectors announced the team to play the touring Australian side at Carlaw Park on September 21. Before a large crowd of 15,000 Auckland went down in a “thrilling” match 16 points to 8. Satherley had an off day with the boot missing 2 penalties and a conversion. The Herald made a note of his kicking with a short article written on it. It said “Satherley was in poor form and missed goals from rather easy positions. A good goal kicker for Auckland would have made the game closer, as the local team was awarded several penalties inside half-way.

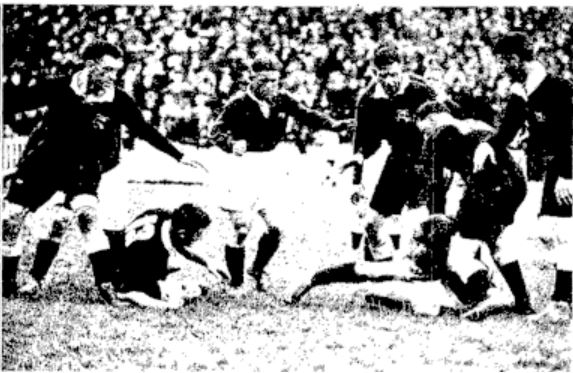
Satherley upright on the right.

In spite of his disappointing goal kicking Satherley was chosen to make his debut for New Zealand in the first test against the same opponent at Carlaw Park on September 28. New Zealand pulled off a shock upset, winning the match handily by 22 points to 14 before a crowd of 20,000 in fine weather. Satherley played in the second row alongside Glynn with his Richmond team mate Harold Tetley at lock. He missed an easy conversion early but a while later in an attacking movement he threw the final pass to Lou Hutt who scored and this time Satherley was successful with his kick at goal. He then also converted Arthur Kay's try which opened Auckland's lead up to 13-5. He missed a conversion attempt of Lou Brown's although this was scored in the corner and then the goal kicking duties were handed to Ted Mincham. In terms of his play around the field it was said that he “was not so prominent as usual”, despite this he was named to play in the second test at the same venue 4 days later. Satherley was once again partnered with Glynn in the second row but this time New Zealand was well beaten by 29 points to 8. Satherley missed a penalty early in the match and then failed to convert Hutt's try however he had been involved in the lead up play to the try with Herb Lilburne and Kay before Cliff Hunt finished it off. Hunt scored again later in the match and this time Satherley was successful with the conversion. For the third test Satherley retained his place in the side but was now alongside Richmond team mate Ray Lawless in the second row with another team mate Harold Tetley at lock making his New Zealand debut. The third test went a similar way to the second with New Zealand well beaten by 31 points to 8 on October 5 before a 20,000 strong Carlaw Park crowd. Although New Zealand were well in the match at halftime with the scores locked at 8-all. Satherley once again missed kicks early failing with 2 penalty attempts, though he did convert Brian Riley's try to give New Zealand a 5–0 lead. He missed two further attempts at goal from penalties before sparking New Zealand's second and final try. He “snapped up in the loose, and was pulled down on the goal line. Prentice and Kay raced past [Ross]McKinnon and Tetley returned the ball to Kay, and Riley raced over for a fine try”. The final match of the Australian tour was against the Auckland provincial side which included players from the sub unions of North Auckland and South Auckland (Waikato). Satherley was not named in the side originally with C. Hollowes from Northland named to play in the second row. However by the day of the match he was in the side which had a similar forward pack to the third test team. In a high scoring match the Auckland Province side went down 36 points to 18. Satherley was not entrusted with the kicking duties in the match with another of his Richmond team mates Eric Fletcher kicking 6 goals.

The 1936 season was a considerably quieter one for Satherley. He was not selected for any representative matches though this was most likely due to the injury he suffered in a round 2 match against Manukau on May 9 where he was concussed and taken to hospital. The newspaper reported that he was living at 235 Ponsonby Road and was aged 27 at the time, with it said that his condition was reportedly “satisfactory” that night. He missed several matches and did not return to the football field until July 18 against Marist. It was said after the match that he was “one of the best” forwards in the Richmond pack. In the meantime Auckland had played 2 matches and had a trial while the North Island match with the South Island had also taken place. As he was only returning to the field a week prior to the Auckland match with the touring England side he stood little chance of being considered for selection. His brother Jack however had moved into the hooker position at Richmond and was selected for the North Island side for the first time. Jack would go on to be selected for New Zealand in 1937 and 1938. In the meantime Cliff finished the season by playing 8 further games for Richmond who finished runner up in the championship to Manukau by a single point. They had revenge of sorts though with the final match of the season being a Stormont Shield final win over Manukau by 30 points to 9, with Satherley kicking a conversion and a penalty.

==== Move to Mount Albert United ====
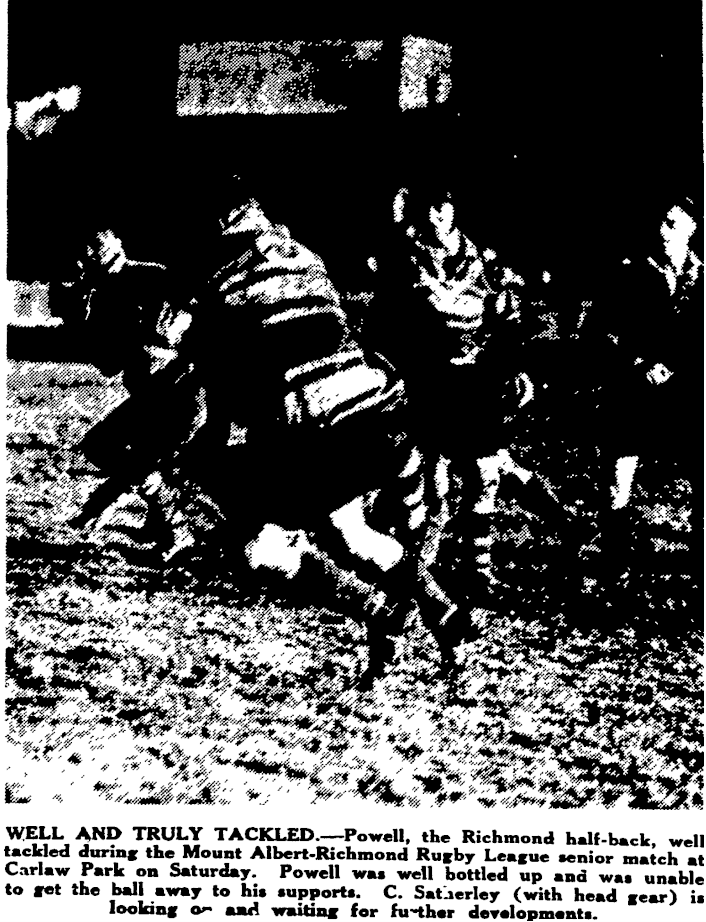
Satherley playing for Mt Albert against Mt Albert in the headgear slightly to the right of the tackle. Mt Albert lost 13-10 on May 1, 1937.

At the start of the 1937 season Satherley moved to the Mount Albert United club based at Fowld's Park in Mount Albert where he became the player-coach. It was Mount Albert's first season in the first grade competition and they went on to surprise followers by finishing runner up to Richmond. He officially debuted for them on April 17 in a match with Ponsonby United and scored a try and kicked 2 conversions and a penalty. However he had in fact played on an end of season tour match for them to Napier at the end of 1936. He kicked a conversion in their 20-11 win over Hawkes Bay. Following a round 6 match against Marist Old Boys on June 5 Satherley was named as the forward emergency player for Auckland in their match against Taranaki, though he was not required to play. In a round 13 match with Manukau in which he kicked 4 goals in a 20–19 win he was forced to move into the first five eighth position when L Patterson went off with “head injuries”. It was said that Mount Albert had been struggling getting their passing going and “Satherley did not remedy the defect” when he took up the position. In total he played 16 matches for them scoring the lone try but kicking 35 goals for 73 points in total. The 62 he scored in competition matches was the 4th most by a senior player in Auckland. As it turned out this was to be his last game of rugby league for several years. In early April, 1938 the Papakura club was being admitted into the first grade competition and there was a suggestion in the Herald that he may play for them but it did not amount to anything.

=== Return to rugby union ===
==== Papamoa club and Te Puke sub-union side ====
The next that was heard of Satherley was in the Te Puke Times on May 3, 1938. The Te Puke Rugby Union had held a meeting where it was reported that Satherley was applying for reinstatement. “Satherley stated that during his connection with league he had received no remuneration whatsoever for his services. It was resolved to support the application and to communicate with the parent body at Whakatāne, asking that union to forward the application to the New Zealand Rugby Union with a view to affecting a transfer”. Days later it was reported that he had been transferred to Te Puke to work at the railway station where his job was a shunter.

On May 24 he was named in the Te Puke sub union representative side to take on Morrinsville away on May 28. He kicked a penalty in 22-3 loss. Then on June 4 he kicked another penalty goal, this time for his club side Papamoa in a 6-all draw with Paengaroa. On June 6 he kicked a conversion in a win for Te Puke against Tauranga in a Parata Cup match which his side won 9 to 6. It was reported around this time that his application for reinstatement was going to be recommended for refusal by the Auckland Rugby Union. However he continued to play during this period. He kicked a penalty in a 12–3 loss while playing for Papamoa against United on June 11. On June 23 the Te Puke sub-union was reported to have expressed regret “at the action of the Auckland Rugby Union in opposing the reinstatement of C. Satherley”. They said that “Satherley had been approached on a number of occasions by Bay of Plenty Rugby League officials asking him to play, but he had steadfastly refused”. Their meeting went into committee regarding the matter, and it was afterwards stated that Te Puke would be furnished, through the Bay of Plenty Rugby Union, with information they required concerning the Auckland Union's opposition”.

Despite not having been granted reinstatement Te Puke continued to select him and he played for them against Tauranga on June 26 at Jubilee Park in Te Puke. He kicked a conversion in a 13–11 loss and narrowly missed a conversion from the side line on full time which would have given them a draw. He played another match for Papamoa and then Te Puke selected him in the Hurinui Shield match against Rangitaiki in Matatā on July 16 and also named him to coach though it is unclear if this was for the rest of the season or just this particular match. Te Puke's only points in an 8-3 loss came from a Satherley free kick in the second half.

On July 20 the New Zealand Herald reported from the Auckland Rugby Union meeting that “another communication from the Bay of Plenty Union referred to the application for reinstatement lodged on behalf of C. Satherley. On the motion of Mr. L. Colgan it was decided to reply that the matter rested with the New Zealand Union”. Three days later on July 23 Satherley turned out for Te Puke once more, this time against Ōpōtiki who were visiting for the first time many years. Te Puke won 14 points to 3 with Satherley yet again kicking a solitary goal when he converted P. Clark's try. The following Saturday he travelled with the Te Puke side to take on Rotorua in a Parata Cup round match. Rotorua won the match 9 points to 8. Before the match was played Satherley was also named in the ‘Bay of Plenty’ side to take on “Central Hawke's Bay” on August 3 at Te Puke. The ‘Bay of Plenty’ side was in fact not a full representative side of the union but was in fact made up of players from Te Puke, Tauranga, and Rotorua. In a match report in the Bay of Plenty Times the team was in fact simply named “Tauranga-Te Puke”. The visiting side won the match by 6 points to 3.

Satherley then returned to his Papamoa side for the semi-final of the senior competition against Maketu on August 13. The result of the match was not reported, nonetheless Papamoa must have won as they played and defeated Paengaroa in the (knockout) final a week later by 11 points to 3 with Satherley kicking a penalty. A week later on August 27 Satherley again played for Te Puke, this time against Whakatane. It was also said when the side was named that the same fifteen would take on Tauranga on September 3 for the Phelan Memorial Cup. The match with Whakatane was played at the Whakatane Domain and saw Te Puke win 9 to 6. Tauranga then defeated Te Puke in their final match of the season by 16 points to nil with Satherley missing 2 of penalty attempts.

==== Bay Of Plenty appearance ====
In 1939 Satherley was elected on to the Papamoa club's committee at their annual meeting on April 6 and was also named as a selector for the senior side along with Mr. Pile. He played 6 matches for them during the season with the majority in the first few months of the season when the club competition was mostly run. On June 3 he played in a Te Puke trial match for the Possibles side. His side won 19 to 9 and he kicked a conversion in the victory in the match played at Jubilee Park. Satherley was then selected for the Te Puke side to play Morrinsville 2 days later. Te Puke won the match 10 points to 9 with Satherley converting both of Te Puke's first half tries. He was involved in the first try and also made a couple of open field runs in the second. It was said that he was one of Te Puke's best forwards along with Phillips. On June 10 he scored a “nice try for Papamoa and he also converted” in their match with Paengaroa at Jubilee Park which they lost 15 to 5.

Satherley was then selected to play for Te Puke in a Parata Cup match against Tauranga at Jellicoe Park in Tauranga on June 24. Satherley was heavily involved in the play in a 9–6 win, though he was only successful with 1 penalty attempt and missed 3 others along with both conversion attempts. He was appointed player-coach of the side to take on Rangitaiki in a friendly match on July 8 along with W. Barker. He scored a try and kicked a penalty in a 6-all draw. His next match was for Te Puke at Arawa Park in Rotorua on July 15. Te Puke lost the Parata Cup match 14-12 with Satherley kicking an early penalty for the red and blacks but then missing several kicks at goal including a conversion at the end of the game which would have tied the scores. The following week he played in the Te Hurinui Apanui Shield match between Te Puke and Tauranga in Tauranga. Te Puke lost 14 to 9, Satherley converted an early try and was involved in several attacking movements in the defeat.

Satherley was then selected for the Bay of Plenty side to make his representative debut for them in a match against Waikato. He was chosen to play in the back row in the match which was to be played at Rugby Park in Hamilton on July 29. The field was described as “literally a sea of mud” with both teams struggling in the conditions Waikato won 11 to 8. He next played for Te Puke against Rangitaiki and was said to be “outstanding” and scored a try although Te Puke went down 20 points to 6 at Matatā on August 12. His try came when he “fended his way through touching down in spite of tacklers”. His last ever match for Te Puke came on August 19 when they travelled to take on Waihi. They won the match by 12 points to 11.

It was reported in an article in the Bay of Plenty Times on September 12 that Satherley was leaving “shortly for Frankton to fulfill a transfer of promotion on the N.Z. Railways staff”. He had been “the guest of honour at a footballers smoke concert” at McDowell's Hall on September 9 with over 60 people in attendance. Mr. A. Spratt and Mr. F. Pearce, “President and Secretary respectively of the Te Puke Rugby Union”, said “Te Puke were losing a valuable and popular member of the Te Puke representative team… his experience as a player was inestimable, and his services as a coach for the team would be greatly missed”. It was also said “he had worked hard, and his enthusiasm in football matters had helped in no small way towards the successful season that had just been completed”. They then presented him with a “handsome crocodile pocket wallet”, while the Papamoa Club gave him a “complete set of silver-backed hair brushes”. Satherley then thanked those responsible for organising the function and for their words and gifts.

==== Frankton Rugby Club and Waikato representative side ====
After his transfer Satherley joined the Frankton Railway rugby club. At their annual meeting in March he was chosen to be the coach and selector of their senior side. He was named in the team in a couple of matches in May but didn't ultimately play. He eventually took to the field on July 6 against Taupiri in a Stag Trophy match. Frankton won 12 to 3 with Satherley kicking 3 penalties. Following a game against Technical Old Boys on July 20 where he scored a try and kicked 3 conversions he was selected in the Waikato squad to train in preparation for a match against Bay of Plenty. The win over Technical Old Boys also secured the Stag Trophy competition for Frankton. He was then selected to play in the match with Bay Of Plenty at Tauranga Domain on July 27 and became the 298th player to represent the Waikato Rugby Union. Waikato won the match 17 to 6 with Satherley converting J. M. Taylor's try which had opened the scoring before a crowd of 1,700. He missed a couple of penalty attempts later in the match. It was said that he “impressed, particularly in line-out work”.

The following week he scored a try and kicked 2 conversions in a 12–11 Frankton win over City which concluded the Stag Trophy competition. He was named in the Waikato side to play Auckland after replacing A. McLean in the middle row of the forwards. The match was played at Eden Park in Auckland on August 10. Auckland won the match 8 points to 3. He missed a conversion and 2 penalties but was heavily involved in several attacking movements. The Waikato Times said “Satherley justified his inclusion in the Waikato representative pack. He took part in many of the finest loose rushes and did some clever backing up which other Waikato forwards could well imitate. In Satherley's form there were glimpses of short, well-controlled dribbling as has rarely been seen in Waikato football of recent years”.

On August 24 Satherley made his debut for the Hamilton sub union representative side in a match with Morrinsville for the Peace Cup elimination competition. Hamilton lost 15–10 with Satherley converting both of their tries and was said to be “prominent”. The Waikato Times said “one of the best Hamilton forwards was Cliff Satherley. Not only did he handle the ball well, take a leading position in the rushes, and try to cooperate with the backs, but also he covered up for the half-back, E.R. Houghton”.

Satherley was then named to play lock once again in Waikato's final representative match of the season against Thames Valley at Morrinsville on August 31. Waikato won the match easily by 28 points to 9. Satherley played well and his “dribbling was again spectacular”. He also “earned applause for solid work in the lineout”.

The 1941 season saw Satherley semi-retired from playing. He was still involved in the Frankton club but only played in 3 games in May and June. He kicked 2 penalties in a match with Technical Old Boys on May 10, and his last game of the season was against Raglan on June 28 where he kicked a lone penalty. Frankton struggled and came last in the championship.

==== Technical Old Boys rugby club ====
In 1942 Satherley transferred to the Technical Old Boys Football Club. His debut for them likely came in a May 23 match against Air Force which they won 37 to 6. He kicked 2 conversions in the win. He played in approximately 9 matches for them in a severely weakened competition due to so many players having left to fight in the war. The opponents suggest the extent of the influence the war was having as he played matches against Waipa, Old Boys, Army, and Air Force. Satherley was now aged 35 which was much older than most players typically played in this era or any other at a first grade level. He was still playing good football however and after a match against Army on June 20 the Waikato Times reported that “the Technical Old Boys forwards, led by Satherley were faster in the loose and co-operated with their backs more than the service team's pack”. On July 14 he was named as an emergency player in the Waikato side to play New Zealand Army at Rugby Park in Hamilton on July 18. He was not required to play however. Then on August 15 he played in the final of the Clarke Cup against Old Boys. His side won 9 to 6 and he kicked a penalty in the win. His final known game of the season, and possibly rugby altogether came on August 22 in a match between Hamilton and Pukekohe for the Peace Cup at Bledisloe Park. Pukekohe won the match 14 to 3 with Hamilton's lone points coming from Satherley's boot.

=== Rugby league return ===
==== Richmond Rovers appearance ====
It is unclear if Satherley had returned to Auckland to live in 1943 however the Auckland Star on May 3 wrote that “two players, who gave good service to Richmond in past years have returned to assist their old team. They are W. Tittleton and C. Satherley…, Satherley is now in the veteran stage but is still a fine forward”. It appears however that the May 1 match with Newton Rangers may have been his only appearance as he was not mentioned in connection with the side again that season. In 1945 a “Satherley” was named to play in the side though it was more likely to be his younger brother Jack who had continued to play for Richmond seniors into the early 1940s.

== Personal life ==
Clifford Satherley married Alma Florence Wilmot (1907-1953) on April 2, 1932. On the 1935 Electoral Roll his address was listed as 235 Ponsonby Road, Ponsonby and his occupation was “porter”. His mother Ingress died on December 17, 1930, in Blenheim aged 50.

Alma gave birth to a daughter (Sylvia Fay Iwan) at St. Kilda at 239 Great North Road on April 1, 1937. Then in 1939 when they he had moved to Te Puke they had a son, Clifton Satherley though he was born at Nurse Woolley's in Herne Bay, Auckland.

Satherley was working as a shunter on the railways and was based in Te Puke initially after moving south after being transferred from Auckland in 1938. He was living with his wife, daughter and father Charles in Railway housing at the time. He was transferred again late in 1939 to Frankton in Hamilton. At the Frankton Railway Shunters’ Council annual picnic held at the Cambridge racecourse in December Satherley's daughter Sylvia won a prize in the 3 year old “events” while Cliff won the “gang relay” with 2 team mates. In December 1940 the end of year picnic was held at Steele's farm in Te Pahu His entire family was all mentioned with it said that Clifton came second in the tiny tot's under 2 race, Sylvia was second in the 2 years to 4 years girls race, Cliff Satherley finished second in the “Shunters’ championship”, while his wife Alma won the “thread the needle”. Cliff also won the “gang relay” with J. Snelgar and S. Roberts, and was on the winning “tug-of-war” team. Their 3rd child Richard Anthony Satherley was born in 1945. Clifton would later play Plunket Shield cricket for Northern Districts and rugby union for Wests and Thames Valley while Richard played rugby union for Suburbs UCT (South Africa). Clifton scored 52 for Northern Districts against the touring MCC team in 1960. Clifton was killed aged just 22 on September 15, 1961 when the car he was travelling in was hit by a shunting train at 10.30pm half a mile south of Paeroa. His companion, Gary Cairncross was also killed instantly.

In the "New Zealand Gazette" of 1942 it was recorded that Satherley was living at 5 Kea Street in Frankton and was still working as a shunter. In September of the same year his name was called out in the Seventeenth Ballot which meant he was eligible for overseas service. It appears that he may have been excused from duty however as he was never enlisted in the military. He may have returned to Auckland at some point around 1943 as he was mentioned as having played a match for his old Richmond Rovers rugby league side.

On August 4, 1944, his father Charles Herbert Satherley died in Auckland aged 79 at Green Lane Hospital. The service was held at W.H. Tongue and Son's Chapel and he was buried at Waikumete Cemetery.

=== Death ===
It is largely unknown what happened to Satherley beyond 1943 until his death on January 7, 1947. The electoral records of 1946 say that he was living at 63 Islington Street in Ponsonby with his occupation as 'soldier'.

The Evening Post in Wellington reported that “Clifford Allen Martin Satherley, aged 39” had been missing since 7 am yesterday. He was “dressed only in a pair of short woollen underpants” and had been a patient of the Wellington Public Hospital. Police search parties had been trying to find him for some time and he was believed to have last been seen at 7:10 am after leaving the hospital. The police had also stated that “they had received a further report that a man answering the description of Satherley had been seen on Mount Victoria about 5.15pm. His body was then found three days after his disappearance on Lyall Bay Beach “shortly before noon”. He was aged just 39 at the time and there were no newspaper reports elaborating on the reason for his stay in the hospital nor his physical or mental state at the time.

He was buried at Karori Cemetery and Crematorium in Wellington on January 13. His plot is in the Church of England section 2, Plot 733 O. It was said at the time of his death he was working as a labourer.

His widow Alma later went on to marry Gordon Donald Sutherland in 1950.
