= Jack Satherley =

New Zealand international rugby league & union player (1910–1994)

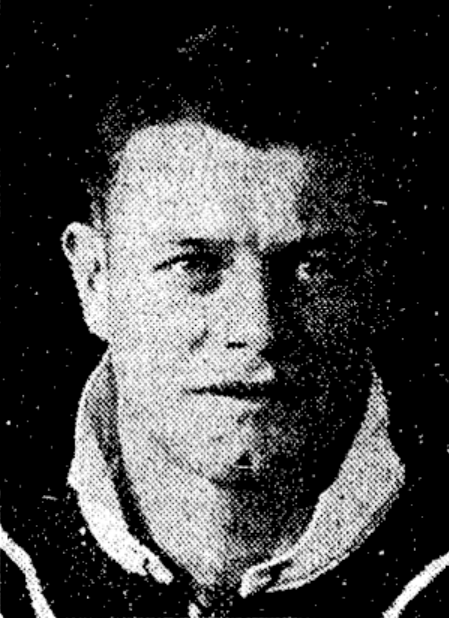

Personal information
- Full name: Leslie Charles John Manson Satherley
- Born: 17 December 1910 Blenheim, Marlborough, New Zealand
- Died: 29 June 1994 (aged 83) Auckland, New Zealand

Playing information
- Height: 170 cm (5 ft 7 in)
- Weight: 11 st 9 lb (74 kg; 163 lb)

Rugby union
- Position: Wing, Second five
Club
Years	Team	Pld	T	G	FG	P
1929–31	Manukau Rovers	33	2	0	0	6
1935	Telegraph Engineers	1	1	1	0	5
1936	Auckland Post & Telegraph	1	1	0	0	3
	Total	35	4	1	0	14

Rugby league
- Position: Centre, Fullback, Prop, Hooker
Club
Years	Team	Pld	T	G	FG	P
1933–45	Richmond Rovers	128	24	2	0	76
Representative
Years	Team	Pld	T	G	FG	P
1936–38	Auckland	5	2	0	0	6
1936–38	North Island	2	1	0	0	3
1937	Auckland Pākehā	1	0	0	0	0
1937–38	New Zealand	5	1	0	0	3
1939	New Zealand Trial	1	0	0	0	3
1940	Auckland Veterans	1	0	0	0	0
- Source: Papers Past As of 25 March 2024
- Relatives: Cliff Satherley (brother)

Jack Satherley (17 December 1910 – 29 June 1994) was a rugby league player. He represented the New Zealand rugby league team in five matches in 1937 and 1938, predominantly at Hooker. In the process he became the 255th player to represent New Zealand. He previously played rugby union for Manukau Rovers in Auckland in the early 1930s before switching to the rugby league code in late 1933 when he joined the Richmond Rovers rugby league club. He also represented Auckland, Auckland Pākehā, and the North Island. His older brother was Cliff Satherley who also played rugby league for New Zealand.

== Early life ==
Leslie Charles John Manson Satherley, more commonly known as Jack Satherley was born on December 17, 1910, in Blenheim. His parents were Ingress Cecilia Manson (1880–1930), and Charles Herbert Satherley (1865–1944). His mother had been married previously to Soren Hansen however she petitioned for divorce in February 1904. They had two children together, Sorine Elvine Hansen (b.1897) and William Claus Hansen (b.1900). The Star (Christchurch) newspaper reported from the proceedings that "when fifteen years of age, in 1897, she married [Hansen] at Wellington, with her parents' consent, her father being present at the marriage. Respondent was alleged to have led a drunken life. Two years after the marriage her husband came home and said he "had had enough of her, and was off". Since then she had seen nothing of him. He was reported to be in Dannevirke, but inquiries failed to find him. She was ill after his desertion, and her baby [Sorine] 14 months old, died. Justice Cooper remarked upon "criminal conduct of parents in consenting to such early marriages"; a girl didn't know her own mind at fifteen, and she was not fit to bear children. Petitioner had not, at the time of her marriage, even reached the maximum school age”.

She remarried Charles Herbert Satherley in 1905. They had three children, Clifford (Cliff) (1907–1947), Phyllis Ida (1909–1986), and Jack. The first mention of Jack occurred in the Nelson Evening Mail on June 18, 1923. Jack, would have been aged 12 at the time. He was charged with riding a bicycle at night at Appleby without a light. He was fined 5 shillings.

== Playing career ==
=== Rugby union ===
==== Manukau Rovers (1929-31) ====
It is unclear when exactly Jack moved to Auckland however his older brother began playing for the Manukau rugby union club in 1926 so it is likely Jack moved at the same time after their schooling. The first confirmed report of Jack playing senior rugby in Auckland was for Manukau on May 25, 1929. The match was played at Eden Park with Manukau losing 9–6 to University. The Sun (Auckland) newspaper wrote “Satherley, a brother of the forward [Cliff], who was given a trial on the wing, should develop into a useful man”. He nearly scored late in the game when he crossed the try line but was taken into touch in goal. Jack spent the remainder of the season back in Manukau's second grade side.

He began to be named in the Manukau senior A squads to start the 1930 season but was not mentioned in any match reports. In their loss to Ponsonby on May 24 he played in the forwards with The Sun saying “John Brimble, [Cyril] Pepper, Dixon, and J. Satherley were also honest packmen”. John Brimble was the older brother of Ted, Walter, and Wilfred who would all represent New Zealand at rugby league, with Wilfred and Walter both on the 1938 tour of Australia with Jack. While Cyril Pepper later became an All Black and was killed during World War 2. Jack then moved on to the wing for their following games including an 8–3 win over Training College on June 21 at Waikaraka Park in Onehunga which was their home ground with the club being based in Manukau in this era, not moving to Māngere until decades later. The following week in an 8–4 win over College Rifles he was involved in a “nice passing movement” with Cotter and Stewart which resulted in Pile scoring. In the second half he was warned by the referee for “rather wild work in the loose”. On July 5 Manukau lost to Marist 11-0 but Satherley was “noticeable in several good solo runs”. He played in further matches against Ponsonby, Training College (x2), and City before the season ended with a loss to University on September 13 and a default loss a week later to Technical College. The newspapers did not cover the matches in great detail so it is unknown how he played in these matches.

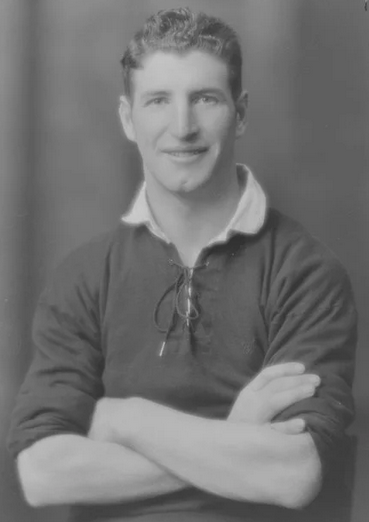
Jack's brother Cliff, who he played against in 1931, and later with, at Richmond.

The 1931 season saw Satherley fully established in the first grade side, playing in 19 matches. He was credited with 2 tries though the newspapers would often omit scoring details from their match descriptions so it is likely that he scored several more given he was playing on the wing. His first game of the season was against Grammar Old Boys on May 2. In a 13–3 loss to University on May 9 on the wing he “showed pace and a clever swerve”. The New Zealand Herald reported that he received a cut on the head and retired” during the second half. A week later on May 16 Jack played against his brother Cliff who had transferred to Ponsonby at the start of the season. It was said that Cliff was one of the “most conspicuous among the pack” and he scored their lone try, with Manukau winning 9–5. Jack was said to have been “prominent” along with Biss on the other wing in Manukau's draw with Technical Old Boys on May 23. A week later Manukau lost to Grafton in Onehunga by 3 points to 0. With the score in Grafton's favour late “the two Stuarts, Biss, and Satherley were desperate in their efforts to smash the defence” but to no avail. The Auckland Star went on to say that “Satherley played a very determined game as winger, and was hard to stop when he saw the line ahead”. The same newspaper a week later described him as “sound” in their 3–3 draw with Marist. The Herald said that he was “outstanding” along with the Stuart brothers in the backs. He then gave “a dashing performance” on the right wing on June 13 against Training College. And played “well” on the wing in an 11–8 win over College Rifles at the Show Grounds on June 20. He scored Manukau's lone try in a 5–0 win on Eden Park No. 3 against Technical Old Boys on July 25. The try came after “a melee on the line, Satherley diving over” after “a rough and tumble”. It was said that he and fellow winger C. Stuart “were essentially individualists, lacking support”. He scored another try 2 weeks later on August 8 in an 11–3 win over College Rifles on Eden Park No. 3. He “dived over in the early stages” to give them a 3–0 lead. The Auckland Star said he was the only Manukau back “who showed any dash”. Though the NZ Herald said that both he and Bill Turei were “outstanding” on the wings.

On September 19 Manukau played in the final of the Pollard Cup against Technical Old Boys at Eden Park. Technical won 16–10. In the first half he “broke clean away, but when blocked, passed inside. Harris intercepted and pulled Tech. out of a difficult position”. His final two games of the season were a round 2 knockout game against Ponsonby which they won 8–6 on October 3. And then a 20–18 win over Patumāhoe in a friendly match on October 10 at the later teams ground.

=== Rugby League ===
==== Richmond Rovers ====
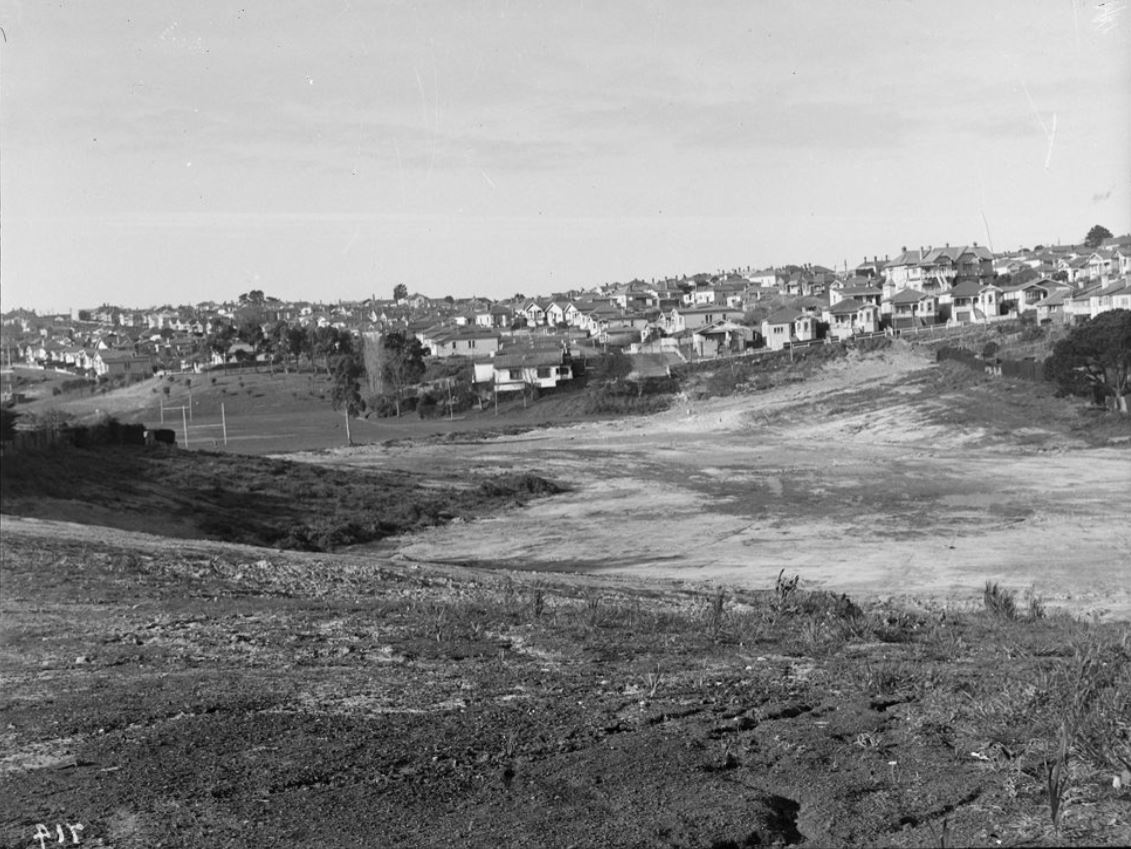
Grey Lynn Park in 1952, home of the Richmond rugby league club.

There was no mention of Satherley playing rugby in Auckland or elsewhere in 1932. In fact he was not mentioned again until an October 14, 1933 game between the Richmond Rovers rugby league side against the touring St. George from Sydney, Australia. Richmond were a club based in the central Auckland suburb of Grey Lynn. St. George had finished runners up in the 1933 NSWRFL competition and were playing 7 matches in New Zealand. Richmond won 5 points to 3 with Satherley being involved in “fine inside back play” along with Roy Powell and Stan Prentice which “prevented the half-backs, Richard Daly and Tom Carey, from going far”.

At the start of the 1934 Auckland Rugby League season Satherley was named in Richmond's round 1 side to play Newton Rangers on April 28 at Carlaw Park. He went on to play 20 games for them during the year. He played at second five eighth (inside centre) in their 18–7 win over Newton with the Herald saying “Prentice is not yet quite at his best, but has a promising second five eighth in J. Satherley”. He had been reunited with his brother Cliff who had switched to Richmond in May, 1933. In a 16–9 win over Devonport United on May 26 it was said that R. O’Donnell and Allan Seagar of the Shore side “caught Prentice and J. Satherley in possession... many times”. A week later in a 3–2 win against Newton he “frequently shone out in good defence”.

On July 11 Satherley actually played a rugby union game for the Engineers against the Police. He was employed by the railway at the time. As the match was employment based and did not require players to be registered with rugby union it was allowed. He scored a try in the Engineers 18–8 win and also kicked a conversion. Fellow league player Dan Keane from the Ponsonby club also scored a try and kicked two goals. After returning to the Richmond side on July 21 he switched places during the match with Bert Cooke the legendary former All Black international, who had switched to rugby league in 1932. Cooke had started at fullback but with Richmond lacking attacking spark he was moved into Satherley's place at second five eighth. Richmond went on to win 13–10. He started at fullback the following week with Richmond winning 18–0 to seal the Fox Memorial championship with three rounds still remaining. The Auckland Star reported that he “did fairly well in a new position, but was well protected by Eric Fletcher at centre”. The Herald said that he, along with several other Richmond backs “did great work in checking the opposing forwards”.

Satherley then went on tour with the Richmond team with matches played at New Plymouth against the Taranaki side, and at Napier against the Hawke's Bay side on August 9 and 11 respectively. It is unknown if he played in the game with Taranaki but he was named in the side to play Hawke's Bay at fullback. Richmond won the first match 23-22 while the second was more lop-sided with Richmond winning 37–11.

After returning to Auckland he played for Richmond in their 26–5 win over Devonport on August 18 in round 1 of the Roope Rooster competition. He “cleverly produced [their] opening try” assisting Eric Fletcher to score. He was back playing at second five, and the New Zealand Herald was critical of his performance overall saying that “he is too slow [in that position] for the company he is in and several times on Saturday he nullified promising movements by the Richmond rearguard”. In the semi finals he scored his first ever try for Richmond and followed it up later in the game with a second. They won 21–13 over Ponsonby United. He and Prentice “went well together, but the inside back tactics were hardly sharp enough”. The Herald wrote that “the conditions suited J. Satherley, who played well and scored two nice tries”. In the final, on September 8 against Marist Old Boys he scored once more in their 20–13 win. He was part of a “strong back combination” of Prentice, Powell, Fletcher, and Cooke, all of whom played for New Zealand. Satherley's try came after Powell kicked ahead before Ray Lawless gathered and sent him over “for a fine try” with the Herald saying he played “his usual sound game”.

With the season in its later stages the Western Suburbs side from Sydney was on a 5 match tour of Auckland. Western Suburbs were the NSW champions and had played games against Marist and Newton before a game with Richmond on September 29. Satherley was named at second five eighth with Stan Prentice at first five. Richmond won 18 to 16 before 15,000 spectators at Carlaw Park with Satherley supporting Prentice well and the two of them “frequently conspicuous for good play”. In a review of the players play later in the week the Herald said “great improvement on attack was also shown by J. Satherley, while his defence was as sound as ever”. The Western Suburbs side played a Ponsonby XIII on October 3 before a second game against Richmond to conclude their tour on October 6. He started at second five but at halftime he moved to fullback with Bert Cooke coming up to take his place. In the first half Prentice and Satherley “bottled up” Vic Hey and Percy Williams and “broke the back of the Australian attack”. Williams was actually a future Australian international and a guest player from the South Sydney brought on tour to strengthen the side. His final match of the season was against Newton in the Stormont Shield final on October 13. Richmond won 21–5 to become the first team to ever win all three major first grade trophies (Fox Memorial, Roope Rooster, and Stormont Shield) in the same season. Satherley was said to have played “a sound game at fullback”.

==== Moved into the Richmond forwards (1935) ====
The 1935 season saw Satherley move into the forwards for Richmond. He mainly played in the second row and at lock but also was tried out at hooker, and at the end of the year in his last game played at second five once more. In total he was not as busy, playing 15 games and not being selected for a handful of matches. His first game was against Newton on April 27 with Richmond winning 27–15. He was playing with his brother Cliff in the forwards and they, along with Joe Ginders, Alf Broadhead, and Ray Lawless “were a power in the open”.

On May 11 against Devonport, Satherley made possibly his first ever appearance at hooker, a position he was to ultimately represent New Zealand in two years later. The Auckland Star reported that he “was only fair in winning the ball from [Tony] Milicich”. Following a 5–3 loss to Mount Albert United on June 3 “[Harold] Tetley, C. Satherley, J. Satherley, and Lawless” were the best of the forwards”. While another article echoed those comments saying “Broadhead, Tetley, and the Satherley brothers were hard workers in the heavy ruck”. A week later on June 29 he “played a fine game in the Richmond forwards...” in their 28–0 win over Devonport.

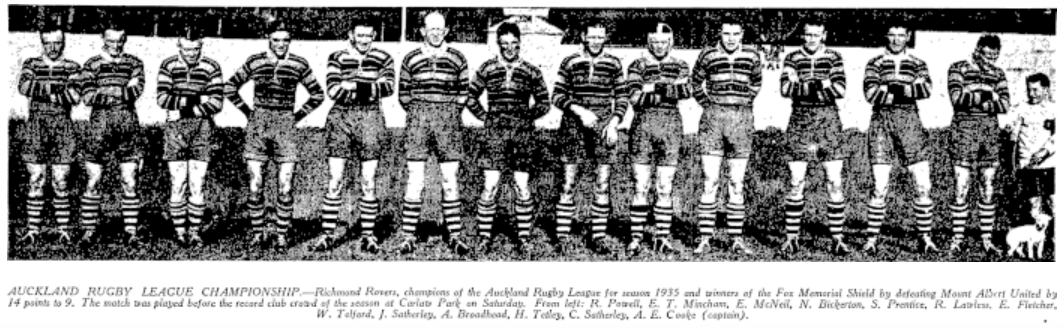
Richmond in 1935 with Jack Satherley 5th from the right with brother Cliff three to his right

. Due to the nature of the hooker position in this era Satherley was not mentioned much in match reports as the majority of his work was confined to scrummaging. There were many more than there are in the modern game and the contest was much more physically demanding. The next mention of him was in a game on August 31 in the semi final of the Roope Rooster. Richmond had beaten the same team 3 weeks earlier to claim the Fox Memorial first grade championship title once more. In the knockout match Richmond won again, 20–6 with Satherley scoring his only try of the year. With Lawless playing a great game it was mentioned that Bill Telford and “the Satherley brothers were a tower of strength in the loose”. The players wore white armbands as a mark of respect for their coach Thomas McClymont whose father had died during the week. McClymont was New Zealand's most successful rugby league coach, coaching the New Zealand side in 1928, and again from 1936 to 1952, as well as coaching Richmond through their historical era in the 1930s as well as Ponsonby, Auckland, and Canterbury, and later Northern Districts. Previous to this he played 100 games for Ponsonby, 17 for Auckland, and 16 for New Zealand. In the final a week later on September 7, Satherley had a chance to tie the scores against Newton. It was a rare (penalty) kick at goal for Jack as usually it was his brother Cliff doing the kicking. However he was away with the Auckland side, along with Bert Cooke, Eric Fletcher, and Bill Telford. The Auckland Star wrote “there was a breathless hush as J. Satherley placed the ball well out from the uprights, sighted and then set it in flight with a powerful kick. Unfortunately for Richmond the kick went astray, and they trooped off the field the defeated side – a rare experience for them over the past two seasons”. His final game of the season was against the same Newton side in the Stormont Shield final. Richmond avenged their loss with a 26–15 win on September 14. He and Prentice were reunited in the five eighths but were said to be “a little slow on attack, but did useful work on defence”. They were apparently “shaded in the early stages when Newton opened with Elan, winning the set scrums and by possessive cohesion were making the play. Later, however, the pair, with Powell varying his methods behind the pack, were seen to better advantage”.

==== Auckland and North Island selection (1936) ====
In 1936 Jack Satherley made his rugby league representative debut. He played 2 games for Auckland, and was also selected for the North Island team to play in their annual match with the South Island. He was busy for Richmond, playing in 19 games, scoring 2 tries. His first match of the season was in a ‘special opening match’ for Richmond against Mount Albert on April 18 before the championship properly began two weeks later. Richmond lost 22–15.

Satherley was then named in their opening Fox Memorial championship match with Ponsonby on May 2. In a 13–12 loss to Mount Albert on May 16 he and Metcalfe were said to be “the best forwards” for Richmond. A week later in a 23–13 win against Marist he was “prominent among the forwards” along with Harold Tetley, and Bill Telford. He “played well” once more in a 19–14 win over Newton a week later on May 30. In the main 3pm match at Carlaw Park the following week Harold Tetley was the best Richmond forward but “was well supported by Telford, J. Satherley, [Hermes] Hadley, and [Alf] Broadhead”. Satherley scored his first try of the season in the 13–13 draw with Devonport (North Shore). Then in round 6 in a 15–6 win over Ponsonby, Satherley was said to be “in the thick of the heavy rucking” along with Alf Broadhead.

Following the game against Ponsonby, Satherley was selected in the Auckland team to make his debut for them. Auckland was playing two matches on the same day with neither distinguished as an A or B team. Satherley's side was to play Wellington at Carlaw Park at 1:30pm and featured 6 current or future New Zealand internationals, with the other team playing Auckland Māori at 3pm featuring 10 current or future New Zealand internationals. Satherley was selected at hooker, between props Bill Telford (Richmond) and John Donald (Devonport). He was opposed in the Wellington scrum by Dick Moisley, the former Marist and Auckland representative who had moved to Wellington years earlier. Auckland won 25–22 with Satherley said to be among the best of the Auckland forwards. He “scored from nice in-and-out passing” to give Auckland a 19–6 lead. Returning to the Richmond side Satherley scored another try in their 27–11 win over Manukau on June 27. The Herald said that “Telford, J. Satherley, Hadley, and Metcalfe were prominent among a good set of forwards”. After the match he was named in a training squad for Auckland to play the England in a months time by selector Bert Avery. His weight was published next to his name as being 11 stone, 9 pounds. The following weekend Richmond drew 11–11 with Mount Albert with Satherley named as being one of Richmond's best forwards.

Satherley was then selected to make his debut for the North Island team for their July 11 match with the South Island. The selector was Bert Avery and he named Frank Pickrang (Auckland) and Joe Cootes (Wellington) to prop either side of him. He was opposed by Reg Ward (Canterbury). The New Zealand Herald noted that “Pickrang, Satherley, [Edgar] Morgan, [John] Anderson and Tetley, all of Auckland, have been outstanding in club games this season”. The North Island won a close match by 21 points to 16 before a crowd of 15,000 at Carlaw Park. Satherley then returned to the Richmond side for their round 11 match with Marist on July 18. In atrocious conditions on the number 2 field at Carlaw Park, Richmond won 3–0. In comments about the prospects of players vying for Auckland selection it was said in the Herald that “Satherley is ... a good forward, but he has not met with outstanding success as a hooker”.

On July 20 Satherley was named in the Auckland team to play the touring England side at Carlaw Park on July 25. The Herald wrote that “Satherley, hooker, has a difficult task, as he has not been outstanding in this department in club football”. He was hooking against the very experienced Tommy Armitt who was in his 7th season of professional rugby league and who would ultimately play 355 games for Swinton, 10 tests for England, and 8 tests for Great Britain. Auckland lost 22–16 in a “valiant” effort in heavy conditions. The Auckland Star wrote after the game that “the English forwards dwarfed their opponents, but, despite the “mountains of flesh” which they had to carry about, they were surprisingly nimble. T. Armitt, the hooker, had weight to spare for raking the ball and he was rarely beaten for possession by J. Satherley, the Auckland hooker”. It went on to say that “Tetley, S. Watene and A. Gault were a pair of willing workers... while Satherley was always using his weight when required”. At one point in the first half the Auckland forwards broke away with Watene and Satherley heading the movement, but Jim Brough saved the situation for England though New Zealand was awarded a penalty and Watene's successful kick tied the scores at 9–9 before England worked their way back into a lead which they never relinquished. In remarks on the scrums in the Dominion newspaper they said that England “were penalised for handling in the scrum, for shepherding, and because T. Armitt, in the middle of the front row, developed a trick of catching the legs of his opposite number, J. Satherley, between his own when the ball was put in the scrum, and leaving the hooking to be done by the men on the side, either [Nat] Silcock or [Harry] Woods”.

Satherley returned to his Richmond side for the remainder of the season. Richmond had been leading the championship but lost to Devonport on August 22 by 5 points to 3. It was noted that “except for Hadley, whose keenness got him occasionally into offside trouble, and J. Satherley, the Richmond forwards were shaded”. The Herald also observed that Hadley was the best forward “while C. Satherley and J. Satherley worked hard”. A week later in a 10–2 win over City Satherley was again “prominent”. On September 12 Richmond lost their semi final match in the Roope Rooster competition to City 10–8. Alf Broadhead was Richmond's best forward with Cliff and Jack Satherley giving “good support”. He then missed Richmond's semi final game in the consolation Phelan Shield knockout competition on September 19 and was instead given permission to play for the Auckland Post and Telegraph rugby union team against the Wellington Post and Telegraph side in an annual game among their employees. The match was played as curtain-raiser to Auckland B v King Country at Eden Park. The Auckland Post and Telegraph team won 17–14 with Satherley scoring a try and giving “a fine exhibition”. Richmond had qualified for the Stormont Shield final against Manukau by virtue of the fact that they had finished runner up in the championship and Manukau had also won the Roope Rooster so Richmond was considered the ‘second best team’ in the course of the season. Richmond won easily by 30 points to 9 on October 3 to finish their season. Late in the first half Satherley picked up a dropped ball and “passed to [Owen] Wilkie who scored”.

==== New Zealand debut (1937) ====
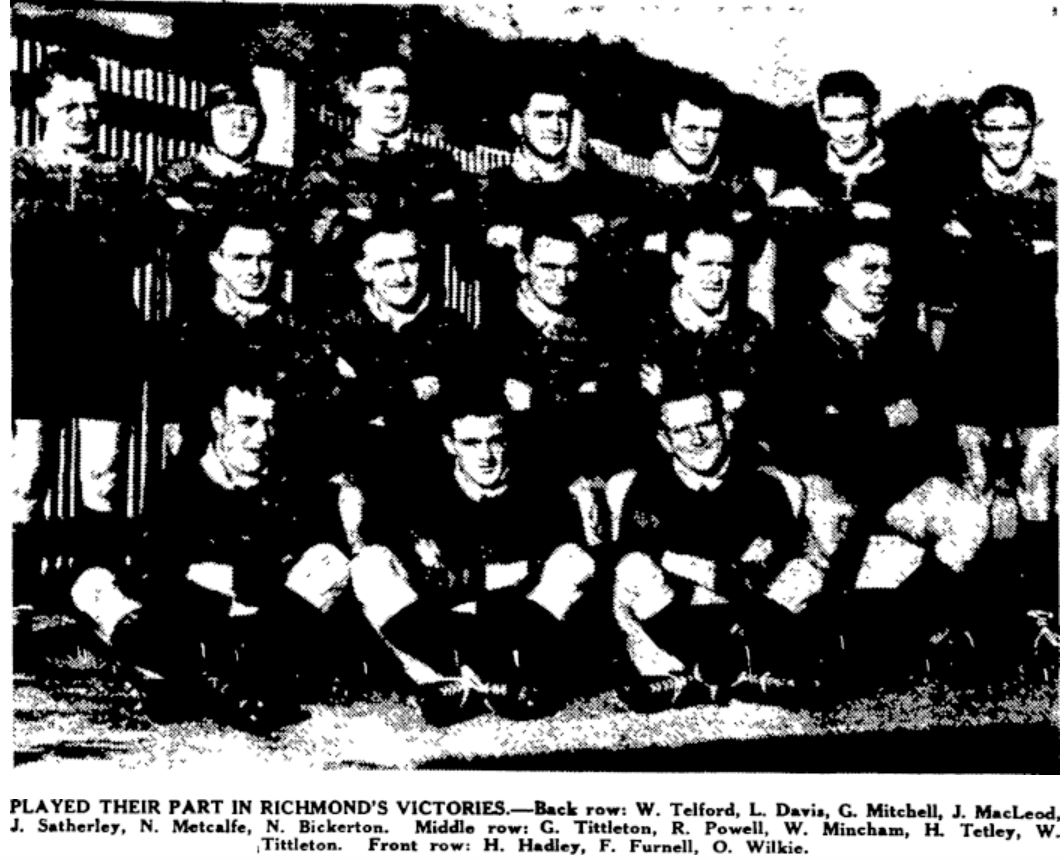
Satherley (3rd from the right, backrow) in the July 3 Richmond side

In 1937 Satherley made his debut for New Zealand in the second test against the touring Australia side. He also played for Auckland against South Auckland (Waikato), and Auckland Pākehā against Auckland Māori, along with 18 games for Richmond.

His first game of the season was for Richmond against Manukau in a preliminary round game at Carlaw Park on April 17. It was reported in the New Zealand Herald on April 21 that Satherley would be the hooker for Richmond for the season. In their first Fox Memorial championship game Richmond beat Mount Albert 13–10 on May 1 with Satherley “always prominent in the forward line” along with George Mitchell, Bill Telford, and Harold Tetley. Satherley's brother Cliff had transferred to the Mount Albert club where he was player-coach. In a 15–13 loss to North Shore a week later Satherley was again named as one of their best forwards along with Mitchell and Telford.

Satherley was named in the 'Auckland' side to play a 'Māori' team at Carlaw Park on May 12. This was the first time ever that the two sides had met though it would become a more regular fixture over the following decades, and from the following year onwards the teams were more specifically named Auckland Pākehā, and Auckland Māori/Tāmaki. Satherley was named at hooker with Bill Breed (Marist) and Angus Gault (Manukau) at prop. The Pākehā team won 24 to 14. On May 15 in a 24–6 win over City Satherley “was outstanding for his consistent hooking”. He was not named for their following game against Marist but was named a week later on May 29 against Newton. In a 15–6 win against Ponsonby on June 5 he was “prominent among the forwards throughout”.

Satherley was selected by former international Hec Brisbane to play for Auckland against South Auckland (Waikato) on June 9. Such was the strength of Auckland rugby league they also chose a side to play Taranaki on the same day. Both teams featured several New Zealand internationals and were of a similar strength with neither singled out as being an 'A' or 'B' team. He was hooker between Bill Breed and Bill Telford once more, with G. Wintle the South Auckland (Waikato) hooker. Auckland won the match 26–12. Returning to Richmond he played in their crucial 15–2 win over Mount Albert on July 3 and gave “good assistance” to Jack McLeod along with Hermes Hadley, and Bill Telford.

Satherley was then named in a New Zealand trial match in the New Zealand Possibles side by selectors Bert Avery and Thomas McClymont. It was later reported however that Satherley was unavailable and he was replaced by Bert Leatherbarrow.

===== New Zealand test selection =====
On Monday, August 9 Satherley was requested to report for training at the Auckland gymnasium that evening. Eleven players had been called upon following the first test loss (8–12) to Australia 2 days earlier. The Australian team played New Zealand Māori on the Wednesday and suffered an upset loss 5–16. The New Zealand selectors, Jim Amos, Thomas McClymont, and Bert Avery then named the second test team with Satherley chosen at hooker. The props would be Angus Gault, and Billy Glynn. Glynn had played hooker in the first test but the selectors had decided to go with a hooking specialist in Satherley for the second match. It was reported that Jack McLeod had picked up an injury in the Māori team's win where he played well at hooker. He had played at lock in the first test. The Herald then wrote later that “the omission of McLeod, who was the successful hooker in the Māori team, comes as a surprise. It is understood McLeod was not injured on Wednesday and his place as hooker is being taken by Satherley, of the Richmond club”. He was opposed by Australian hooker Fred Nolan from the North Sydney club.

The second test was played at Carlaw Park on August 14 and saw New Zealand register an upset 16–15 win over an injury ravaged Australian side before 25,000 spectators. In the first half Pearce left the field with a broken leg. Then with Australia leading at halftime 15-6 they lost Jim Gibbs to a rib injury shortly after the resumption. Soon after, Satherley went “bursting over to score under the uprights” with George Nēpia converting to narrow the score to 15–11. In the build up Satherley had been associated in a “nice passing bout” with Joe Cootes and Billy Glynn which led directly to the try. Later Nēpia kicked a penalty and then Noel Bickerton crossed for a try to give New Zealand the lead before Wally Prigg was also forced from the field with a shoulder injury before the game ended with New Zealand victors. The Herald later said that “Cootes and Satherley gave valuable support and the latter's try was a fine effort”.

===== Richmond's 3rd title =====
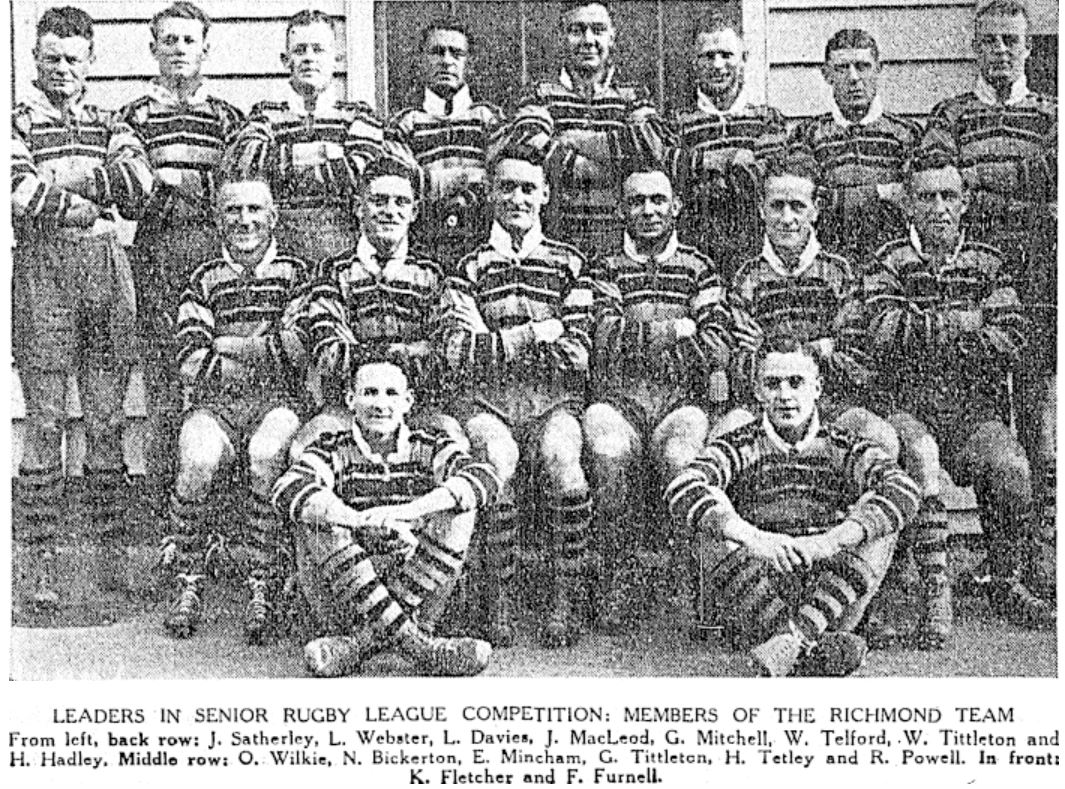
Satherley (back left) in the Richmond team which won the championship for the 3rd time

Satherley then returned to his Richmond side who suffered a 30–24 loss to Marist. Richmond were in the championship lead at the time but the loss meant that going into the final round their lead was narrowed to one point over Marist and Mount Albert. Satherley scored a try in the loss and was one of the best Richmond forwards. His try came after Bill Glover made a good tackle on him but Jack McLeod gained possession and sent the ball back to Satherley to cross for the try. The try gave them the lead but a flurry of points saw Marist take a commanding 12 point lead into the half time break. With Richmond needing to win their final round match against Newton to secure the first grade championship they won comfortably by 30 points to 9 to win the title for the 3rd time in 4 seasons. Satherley scored two tries in the win. The Auckland Star wrote that “Satherley and Alf Broadhead were always on hand when there was hard work to be done. Satherley incidentally played one of his best games to date and scored twice as a result of fine breakaways”. The Herald also said that Satherley “played his best game this season” and both his tries were “runaways”. Richmond were knocked out of the Roope Rooster and Phelan Shield competitions in the first round before their final game of the season against Marist in the Stormont Shield final on October 2. Marist won 12-5 though “J. Satherley gave his side signal service in that he won the ball for Richmond with consistency from the set scrums”.

==== New Zealand tour of Australia (1938) ====
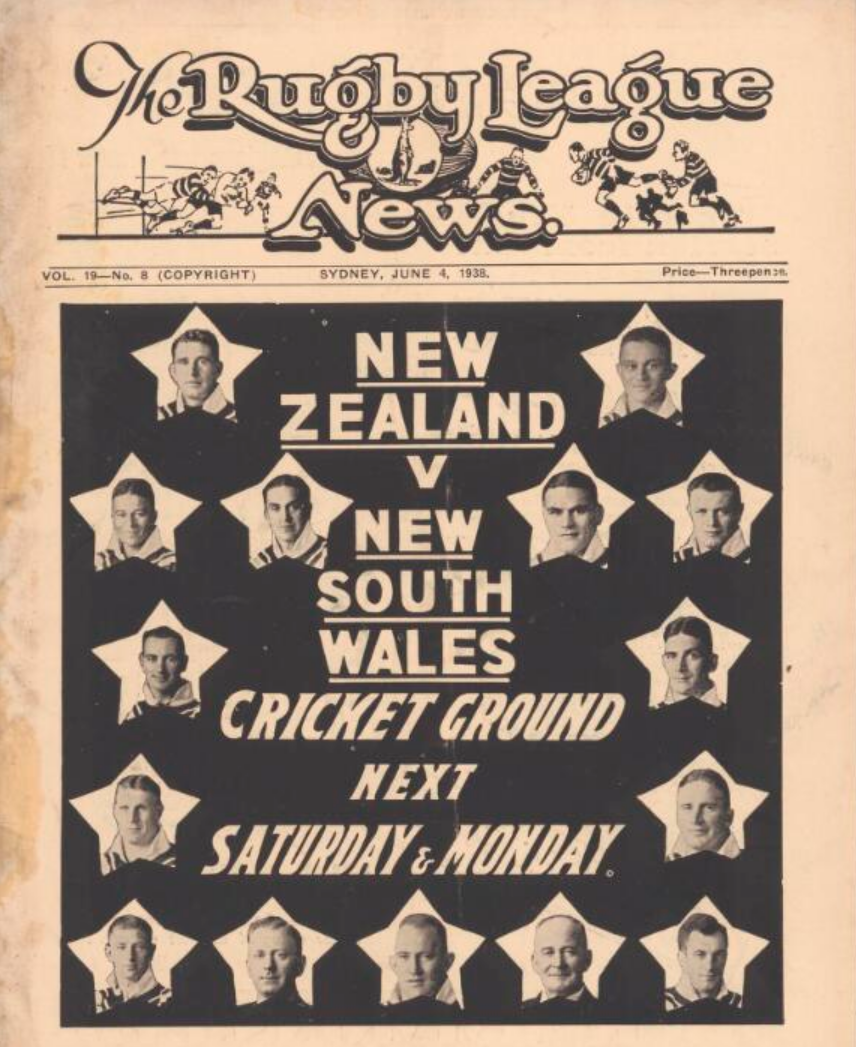
The Rugby League News publication in 1938.

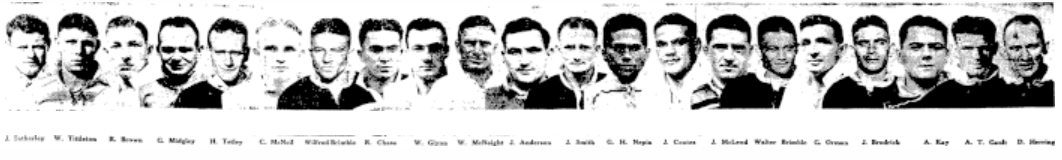

The 1938 season saw Satherley once again selected to represent New Zealand when he was chosen for the tour of Australia. He also played for the North Island in their inter-island match, twice for Auckland, and 17 matches for Richmond.

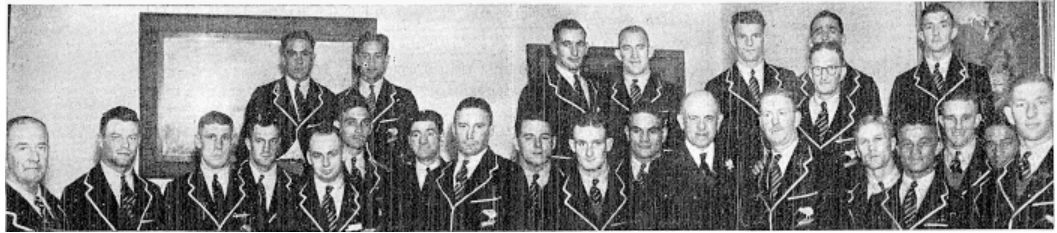
Satherley 2nd from the left at a farewell function.

In Richmond's opening round win over Papakura on April 9, Satherley scored a try. It came after Noel Bickerton and Wally Tittleton combined for Satherley to “race across”. In mid May Satherley was chosen in the Auckland team to play the ‘Rest of the North Island’ side by selectors Bert Avery, Hec Brisbane, and A. Renwick. The Auckland Star wrote “Satherley, of Richmond, is the selectors’ choice as hooker, and his supports will be Gault, of Manukau, and [Des] Herring, of Mount Albert”. He was opposed by W. Brooks of South Auckland (Waikato). Auckland thrashed their opposition by 67 points to 14 with Satherley scoring one of their 15 tries. Following the match he was selected for the North Island team to play the inter-island match against the South Island. The North Island won easily by 55 points to 2 on May 21 at Carlaw Park. Satherley scored a try after Des Herring, Walter Brimble, and Jack Brodrick “were associated in a passing bout” with Satherley finishing it off to give them a 20–2 lead.

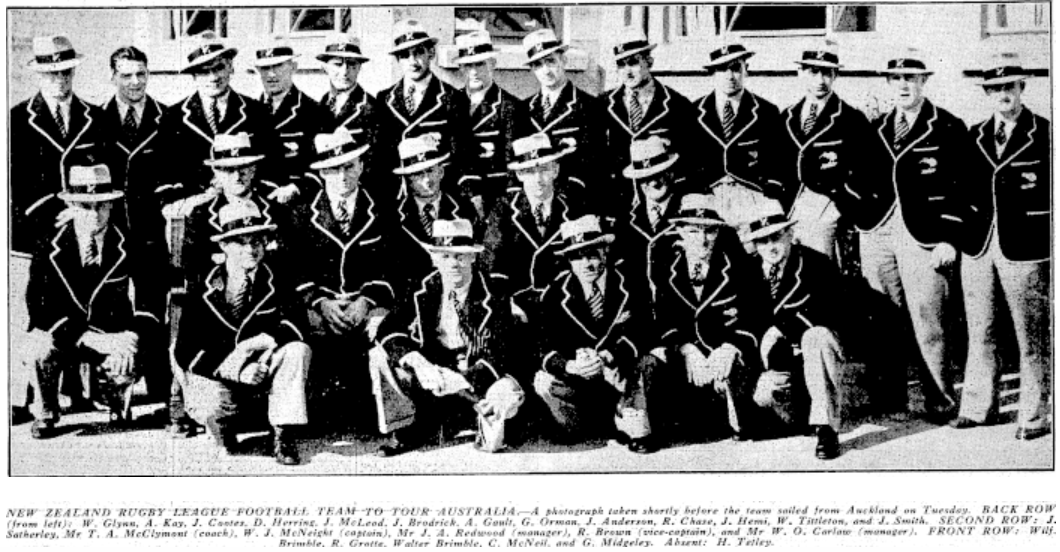

Satherley was then selected for the New Zealand team to tour Australia. The selectors were Thomas McClymont, Hec Brisbane, and Jim Amos. The Auckland Star remarked that “Orman, the Buller player, proved on Saturday that he is a hooker of great ability, and Satherley, who has played consistently in Auckland club football, showed that he is a good man for the position, provided that the weight is put in by the others. Last season there was a hooking weakness evident, and the standard set by players of the calibre of [Sam] Lowrie and [Wally] Somers in the past was not reached. This year the weakness appears to be remedied”. The Herald said that “Satherley... will lack nothing in experience, and is also a good forward in the loose”. In profiles of the players they wrote “J.M. Satherley (Auckland) is 25 years of age and weighs 11st. 6lb. He is the other hooker and is capable in this department...” Prior to departing Satherley played a game for Richmond against Mount Albert on May 28 and scored a try. He was “always prominent” in the Richmond forwards and although opponent “Leatherbarrow hooked well, Satherley also got a good share of the ball for Richmond”. After arriving in Australia Satherley was named in the first match of the tour against New South Wales at the Sydney Cricket Ground on June 11. New Zealand lost 25–12 before a crowd of 28,303 with Satherley opposed by Roy Kirkaldy. Despite the scoreline it was said that the New Zealand side impressed onlookers. Satherley was injured in the first half along with Bill McNeight but was able to continue. New Zealand had led during the second half before they lost Arthur Kay to injury and were overcome by New South Wales. The Truth newspaper in Sydney said that “Gault, McNeight, Satherley, and Herring were like tigers in close”. The Sydney Morning Herald reported that “New South Wales gained a two-thirds share of the ball from the scrummages, and in an effort to win more of the ball the New Zealand selectors have decided to change their front row. D. Herring and J. Satherley, the hooker, have been omitted, and their places filled by G. Orman, hooker, and J. Cootes”.

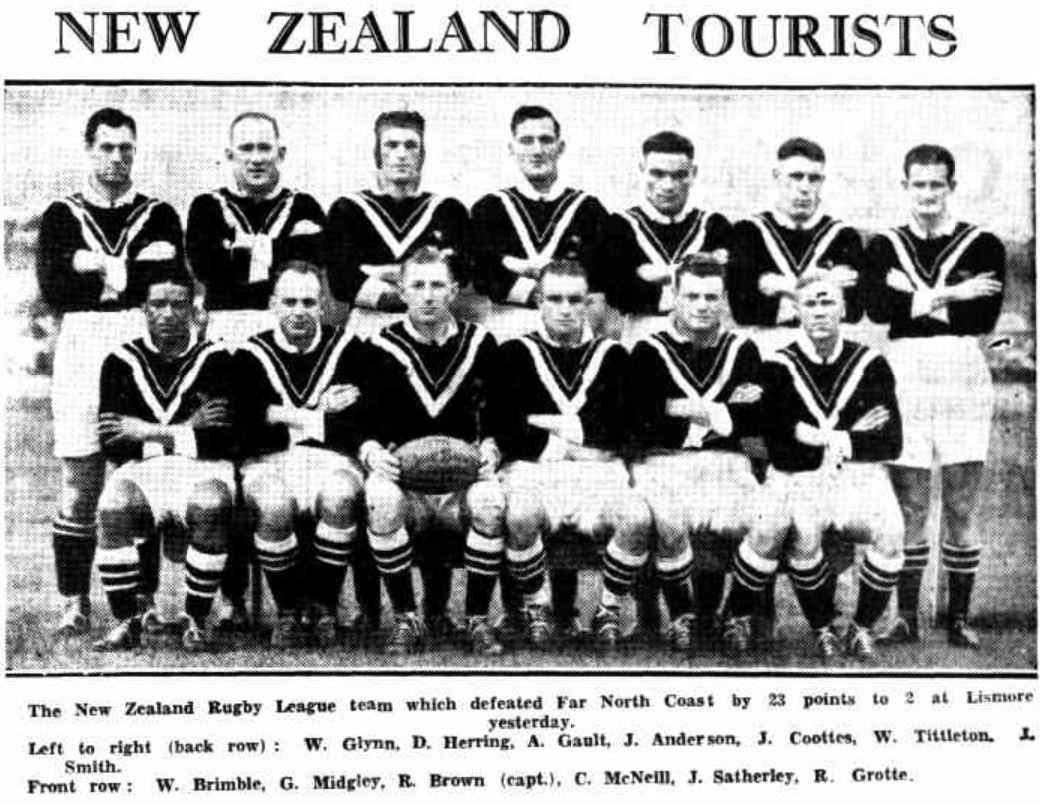

New Zealand won the second match with New South Wales by 37 points to 18 on June 13. The team then travelled to Lismore to play North Coast on June 15. Satherley was recalled into the side at hooker with Joe Cootes and Des Herring his props. He was marking the North Coast captain J. Bond. New Zealand won 23–2 before 2,200 spectators at the Recreation Ground in Lismore. The Tweed Daily said that “it was not uncommon in the second half to see J. Cootes, Glynn, Satherley, and Herring in complete control of the ball, beating off the individual efforts of L. McLaren, J. Bond, J. Lever, and E. Norton”.

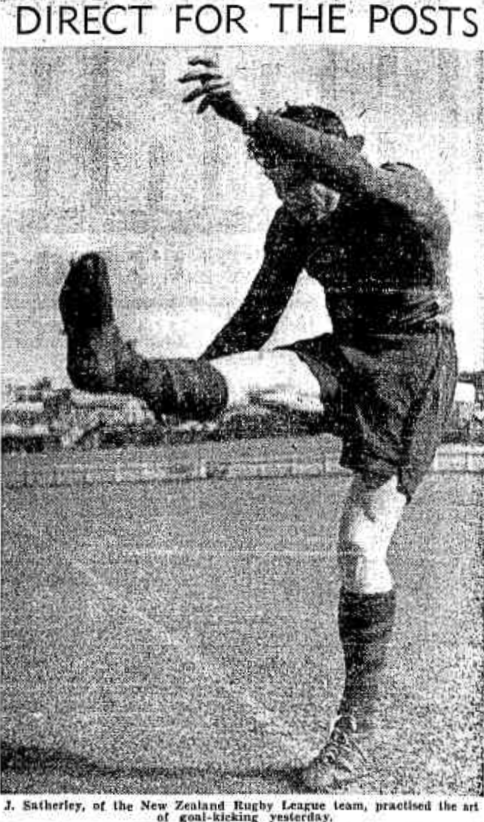

The next game was against Queensland on June 18 at the Brisbane Cricket Ground with George Orman selected at hooker. Before the match, W. Sneyd of the Telegraph (Brisbane) noted that both Orman and Satherly were capable hookers and also commented on Satherly's effectiveness in open play. New Zealand lost 31-11. The New Zealand Herald subsequently attributed some of the team's difficulties to a lack of scrum possession and questioned the decision to select Orman ahead of Satherly at hooker, citing Satherly's greater experience in this position. Orman was retained at hooker for the match against Toowoomba on June 22, which New Zealand won 12–11; Satherley did not play. In the second match against Queensland on June 25, Satherley was selected at lock while Orman again played at hooker. Contemporary reports noted that New Zealand had focused on scrummaging and play-the-ball technique in training in preparation for the match. New Zealand lost 21-12, with Queensland winning the penalty count 23-14 and the scrums 28-26. Contemporary reports also commented that Satherly's defensive contribution. The Telegraph reported that he and Wally Tittleton closely marked Jack Reardon, while the Sunday Mail noted his tackling against Queensland. The Referee similarly reported that Satherly tackled effectively and contributed in his role at breakaway.

Satherley then moved back into the hooking position for New Zealand's next match on June 29 against NSW Group 4 at Tamworth Oval. New Zealand won 26–15 after leading 16–0 at halftime. He was named to play at lock forward once more for their July 2 match with Newcastle at the Newcastle Sports Ground but was said to be suffering from a heavy cold and ultimately did not play. He was named as a reserve for the final match of the tour against Sydney but was not required to play. The team then arrived back in Auckland on the morning of July 11 on board the Aorangi ship. After their return one of the managers of the team, Jack A. Redwood said that “neither Satherley nor Orman... could overcome the opposition they met in the big matches, but the latter showed up well in other branches of play”. He was also quoted as saying that the two hookers “Orman and Satherley, were able to gain their fair share of the ball toward the end of the tour. All the forwards played well and it was unfortunate that Tetley, Satherley, and Gault were injured”. New Zealand played one final match after returning which was against the Auckland side but Satherley was in the reserves and not required to play.

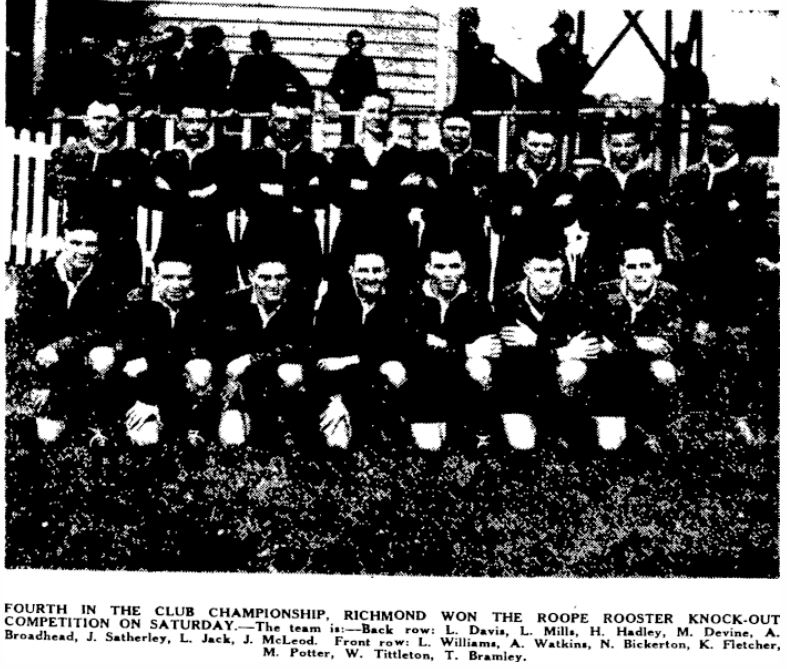

Satherley then returned to the Richmond side for the remainder of the season. He was selected in the Auckland team to play Canterbury on August 13. The side was made up entirely of Richmond and Manukau players who were not playing club matches on the day. Despite it being chosen from just two teams the side was still a strong one with ten of the thirteen players being New Zealand representatives. Auckland won a close game 28–22. He then played in Richmond's 20–8 win over City in the final of the Roope Rooster knockout competition. Satherley was named in Richmond for their October 1 match against the touring Eastern Suburbs side. The Herald suggested that Satherley “is likely to gain a good share of the ball for the backs”. Before a crowd of 11,000 Richmond won 11–9. Jack McLeod and Satherley “in particular being at the top of their form”. The Herald wrote that Satherley “has never been seen to better advantage in all-round play. His tackling and following up were splendid, and, as was anticipated, he gave his side a good share of the ball from the scrums”. With Eastern Suburbs leading 3-0 Richmond went on attack and following good work by Merv Devine, Watkins, and McLeod “Satherley snapped up, to give a perfect “dummy” to Norton and scored”. With the score 11-9 “just before time Robinson and Arnold carried the ball near the Richmond line, but Satherley saved with a splendid low tackle”. After the game in an interview the manager of the touring side, Mr. J. Quinlan said “the splendid tackling of the Richmond players also impressed him”, praising Wally Tittleton and Satherley in particular.

==== Richmond (1939) ====
The 1939 season saw Satherley playing for Richmond once more but perhaps surprisingly he was not selected for the aborted New Zealand tour of England. In round 1 of the championship Satherley was injured in Richmond's 15–14 win over City and had to go off. Jack McLeod replaced him at hooker and played well. He was only named intermittently over the following 2 months and may have missed some matches. On June 10 Richmond beat City 8–0 in round 10 with the Herald writing that “Satherley won the ball from the scrum frequently and his hooking was cleaner that that of Airey, a former Canterbury representative”. In a 26–14 win over Marist on June 17 he set up Dave Solomon's try after he kicked through for Solomon to score.

Satherley was then named in the reserves for the North Island v South Island, and Possibles v Probables set of games at Carlaw Parkon July 8. The hooker chosen for the North Island was J. Brooks of Waikato while Maurice Quirke and Bert Leatherbarrow both from Auckland were chosen to hook in the other match. Following the matches a further New Zealand trial was arranged for July 11 between the Possibles and Probables with Satherley named at hooker in the Probables side, playing opposite J. Brooks. The Auckland Star said “Brooks, of South Auckland [Waikato], and Satherley, of Richmond, will be matched as hookers, and both will have good support. The Probables side won 27-18 with it said that Brooks and Satherley “were exceptionally well matched as hookers, and both got a fair share of the ball for their respective teams”. Satherley was involved in their first try after he and John Clark of Canterbury “raced away and from a scramble George Mitchell scored”.

He then returned to his Richmond side to finish the season. On July 22 in a 23–14 loss to Manukau he “received a nasty face injury and was treated at hospital”. It appears he was not too badly injured as he was named in the side to play the following week against Papakura. On August 19 the Richmond side traveled to Huntly to play South Auckland (Waikato) and won 21–16. It was said that “good hooking by J. Satherley had much to do with the defeat of” the local side. It is unclear if he played in any of Richmond's remaining games and he was left off the team list completely for their final games against Manukau on September 16 and City on September 30.

==== Retirement and return (1942) ====
It appears that late in 1939 Satherley had decided to retire from the game. He did not play at all in 1940 aside from a rugby league veterans game between Auckland Veterans and South Auckland Veterans at Carlaw Park on October 19. The match was for the Les Lees Challenge Cup with both sides being entertained after the match by the New Zealand Rugby League Old Boys Club at a dinner at Hotel Auckland. The Auckland side was particularly strong with 10 of the 13 starting players former New Zealand representatives. The Auckland side won 31–18 with Satherley scoring one of their seven tries, most of which were converted by Craddock Dufty. Satherley did not play at all in 1941.

Then in 1942 Satherley came out of retirement to rejoin the Richmond side once more. With World War 2 well underway many senior sides were struggling for playing numbers and many players came out of retirement to play for their former clubs. There was much less reporting of games due to the dominance of war reporting and so it is unclear exactly how many games Satherley played though it was most likely around 18, and he scored 6 tries which was the most in his club career in a single season. It was reported on April 20 that he would be available for their opening match. Despite not having played a serious competition match for around 2 1/2 years he scored three tries in a 22–10 win over the combined Marist-North Shore side. In reality it was against Marist as the North Shore club had refused to contribute any players to the forced merger team until a change of mind in round 7. The New Zealand Herald said that “J. Satherley, the Richmond hooker, was in good form and scored three tries”. A week later he scored again in their 27–4 win against Ponsonby. Then in round 5 on June 6 he scored another try and kicked the only goal of his career which was a penalty in their 23–17 loss. Both teams scored 5 tries but Richmond had missed all of their conversion attempts. He had only been mentioned as attempting a goal kick one other time in his career though he had been photographed practising his goal kicking while on the 1938 tour of Australia. Team lists were not published at all in the Auckland newspapers and the match reports were extremely brief, with Satherley not mentioned at all until September 12 when he scored a try in Richmond's 7–6 win in the Roope Rooster semi final against Ponsonby.

==== Retirement and return once more (1945) ====
Satherley once more retired from the game, not playing at all in the 1943 and 1944 seasons. He did however make a full comeback in 1945 for Richmond. He played 20 games scoring 5 tries. He played in their opening games against Point Chevalier and North Shore which they both won. Satherley played at prop for their April 28 win over Newton. Richmond recorded a record score with their 70–0 win with Satherley scoring twice. At hooker was Ernie Pinches who later became deputy mayor and then acting mayor in 1987/88. Richmond then lost to Mount Albert on May 5 by 11 points to 7. With Richmond trailing 8-3 early in the second half Satherley “broke away and raced 30 yards before passing to [Aubrey] Thompson, who was soundly tackled”. The Auckland Star wrote “J. Satherley, an experienced hooker, was also prominent in the loose”. Satherley scored in a 25–7 win against Ponsonby on June 2.

On August 11 in an 11–7 win over Manukau Satherley scored another try however the win was overshadowed by foul play against Satherley by Joseph Zimmerman. Following the match an inquiry was held by the Auckland Rugby League “in connection with an incident near the end of the game when J. Satherley, one of the Richmond players was injured, and lay on the ground for some time receiving attention. At the time of the incident a set scrum was being formed, and Satherley was seen to reel and fall”. It was also reported that the injury was the result of “what appeared to be a wilful head butt by a Manukau forward”. His try earlier had come as a result of “a passing bout” and he also “did good work in the loose”. Zimmerman was later found guilty by the Auckland Rugby League control board and suspended for the remainder of the season. On September 1 in a championship final match against Ponsonby, which was later essentially downgraded to a semi final fixture, Richmond beat Ponsonby 7–3. At one stage he “stormed the Ponsonby goal line” with Richmond going close to adding to their 7–0 lead in rainy conditions. Richmond then lost what was then set up as the Fox Memorial championship decided to Otahuhu Rovers on October 13 by 11 points to 5. The final match of Satherley's career came on September 29 in the Roope Rooster final loss to North Shore by 22 points to 12. Satherley scored a try in his last game.

== Personal life ==
Jack Satherley worked as a lineman and in 1935 was living with Alma (Wilma) Florence Purdy at 235 Ponsonby Road, Ponsonby, in central Auckland. Satherley and Purdy were married on October 16, 1937. Alma's father died on November 12, 1937, with a memorial notice published by Alma and Jack. They had four children, Richard Anthony Satherley (1939-?), and Sylvia Fay Iwan Satherley (1937-?), Ella Louise Satherley (1940–40), and another daughter born on October 12, 1943, while they were living at 4 Dublin Street in Ponsonby. Tragedy struck the family on February 25, 1940, when their daughter Ella Louise died aged 3 days while the family was living at 4 Dublin Street in Ponsonby. Then on August 8, 1943, they had another daughter.

In 1941 he was groomsman at a relatives wedding in Palmerston North. According to military records in 1942 Satherley was living at 4 Dublin Street in Ponsonby and working for New Zealand Rail. On August 1, 1944, Jack's father Charles died at the age of 79. He had been living with Jack at the time.

In 1947 Jack's brother Cliff Satherley died in Wellington on January 7. The Evening Post in Wellington reported that “Clifford Allen Martin Satherley, aged 39” had been missing since 7 am yesterday. He was “dressed only in a pair of short woollen underpants” and had been a patient of the Wellington Public Hospital. Police search parties had been trying to find him for some time and he was believed to have last been seen at 7:10am after leaving the hospital. The police had also stated that “they had received a further report that a man answering the description of Satherley had been seen on Mount Victoria about 5.15pm. His body was then found three days after his disappearance on Lyall Bay Beach “shortly before noon”.

By 1954 Jack and Alma were living at 38 Dedwood Terrace with Jack working as a foreman. By 1963 Jack was living at the same address on Dedwood Street though possibly alone after the death of his wife Alma on January 1, 1968, aged 54.

Jack was living at the same address in 1969 according to electoral records and living with Maureen P. Satherley who was a “spinster”, while Jack was working as a “Civil Servant”. By 1978 they were still living together at the same address with Jack working as a storeman and Maureen a secretary.

Jack died on June 29, 1994, aged 83. He was cremated with his ashes buried at Waikumete Cemetery in Glen Eden, Auckland.
