= Clifton Satherley =

New Zealand cricketer

Personal information
- Born: 8 March 1939; Auckland, New Zealand
- Died: 14 September 1961 (aged 22); Paeroa, New Zealand
- Source: Cricinfo, 1 November 2020

Clifton Satherley (18 March 1939 – 14 September 1961) was a New Zealand cricketer. He played in two first-class matches for Northern Districts from 1959 to 1961. In 1961, Satherley and a friend died when their car was hit by a train at a level crossing. His father was Cliff Satherley who played for the New Zealand rugby league team and played provincial rugby union for Auckland, Hawke's Bay, Bay of Plenty, and Waikato, while his uncle Jack Satherley also played rugby league for New Zealand.

== See also ==
- List of Northern Districts representative cricketers
