= Grammar TEC RC =

Rugby club in Auckland, New Zealand

Coordinates: 36.8530680°S 174.8205806°E

Grammar TEC is a rugby club in Auckland, New Zealand resulting from an amalgamation of several rugby clubs . The clubs involved include Grafton and Cornwall, who united to form Carlton. The creation of Carlton was followed by teams called Teachers and Eastern who formed Teachers Eastern.

Another team merger involving Carlton and Grammar Old Boys in 1996 produced the team known as Grammar Carlton. Finally, Grammar Carlton and Teachers Eastern came together and became Grammar TEC in 2013. Grammar TEC, a merger of five clubs, was successful in winning the Gallaher Shield in 2015.
