= Bill Telford =

NZ rugby league footballer and coach

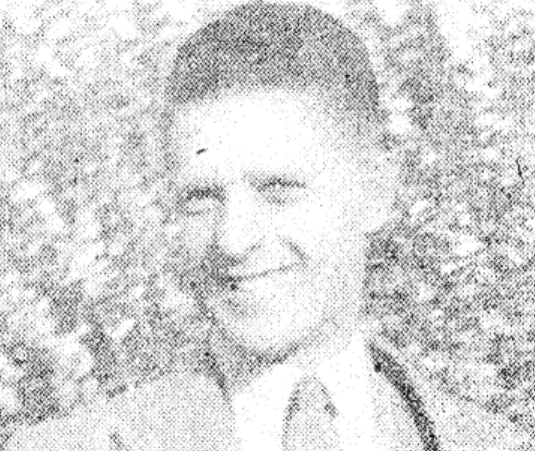

Personal information
- Full name: William Telford
- Born: 5 November 1905 New Zealand
- Died: 25 September 1998 (aged 92)

Playing information
Club
Years	Team	Pld	T	G	FG	P
1927	Richmond Rovers	14	3	1	0	11
1928	Glebe	6	1	0	0	3
1929–37	Richmond Rovers	117	36	0	0	108
	Total	137	40	1	0	122
Representative
Years	Team	Pld	T	G	FG	P
1932–36	Auckland	8	1	0	0	3

Coaching information
Club
Years	Team	Gms	W	D	L	W%
	Ponsonby
Representative
Years	Team	Gms	W	D	L	W%
1956–57	New Zealand
1961–63	New Zealand
1965	New Zealand
- Source: RLP

Bill "Snow" Telford was a New Zealand rugby league player and coach who coached his country several times, including in the 1957 World Cup.

== Playing career ==
Telford played for the Richmond club in the Auckland Rugby League competition.

In 1928 Telford played for Glebe in the NSWRL Premiership.

== Coaching career ==
In 1948 Telford managed the Auckland side for coach Stan Prentice.

Telford first coached New Zealand between 1956 and 1957, leading the 1956 tour of Australia and coaching the team at the 1957 World Cup.

He advised the West Coast when they travelled to Auckland in 1960.

His second spell as head coach of the Kiwis was between 1961 and 1963 and included the 1961 tour of Great Britain and France and the 1963 tour of Australia.

Telford's final spell as head coach came in 1965 when he led the tour of Great Britain and France. Telford finished his New Zealand coaching career with 8 Test victories, 3 draws and 17 losses.
