= Frank Pickrang =

New Zealand international rugby league player

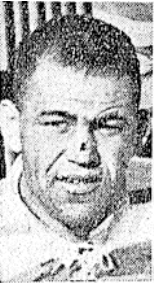

Personal information
- Full name: Francis John Pickrang
- Born: 18 February 1915 New Zealand
- Died: 23 May 1998 (aged 83) Gisborne, New Zealand

Playing information
- Height: 6 ft 0 in (183 cm)
- Weight: 13 st 12 lb (88 kg)

Rugby union
- Position: Number 8, Second Row
Club
Years	Team	Pld	T	G	FG	P
1935	Waitanguru	11	4	0	0	12
1946	Pinedale	7	7	0	0	21
	Total	18	11	0	0	33
Representative
Years	Team	Pld	T	G	FG	P
1935	Maniapoto (sub union)	4	1	0	0	3
1935	King Country	5	0	0	0	0
1946	Putaruru (sub union)	2	0	0	0	0

Rugby league
- Position: Lock, Second-row, Prop
Club
Years	Team	Pld	T	G	FG	P
1936	Manukau	17	5	0	0	15
1937–38	Ponsonby United	15	3	1	0	11
1939	City (Whangarei)	4	1	1	0	5
1939	City-Portland	1	0	0	0	0
	Total	37	9	2	0	31
Representative
Years	Team	Pld	T	G	FG	P
1936	Auckland Māori	1	0	0	0	0
1936	North Island	1	0	0	0	0
1936	Auckland	1	0	0	0	0
1936	New Zealand	2	0	0	0	0
1937	Possibles (New Zealand Trial)	1	0	0	0	0
1939	Northland (trial)	1	0	0	0	0
1939	Northland	1	1	0	0	3

Francis John Pickrang (18 February 1915 – 23 May 1999) was a rugby union and rugby league player. He represented the New Zealand rugby league team in 2 tests against England in 1936. In the process he became the 245th player to represent New Zealand. Pickrang also played rugby union for Waitanguru, Maniapoto, Pinedale, Putaruru, and represented King Country Rugby Football Union. In rugby league he played for the Manukau and Ponsonby United clubs in Auckland, as well as representing Auckland, and the North Island. He later moved to Whangārei where he played for the City club and played one match for Northland. Pickrang enlisted in the New Zealand military and fought in World War 2 as part of the 2nd N.Z. Expeditionary Force.

== Early life ==
Francis John Pickrang was born on 18 February 1915. His mother, Wilhelmina Elizabeth Pickrang (nee Dymock) was born in Otago. She married Anselmo Pickering (spelling later became Pickrang) who had been born on the island of Saint Croix in the United States Virgin Islands. Ansell had been shipwrecked onboard the Weathersfield in 1888 off the Wellington Heads. He died on 20 September 1912. They had four children, Horiana Eliza Pickrang (b. 1905), Charles Edward Pickrang (b. 1907), Violet Adelaide Pickrang (b. 1911), and Ansell Fitzgerald Pickrang (b. 1913). Ansell was born on 15 January, less than four months after the death of his father. Violet died aged eight months on 27 August 1912, three weeks before her father's death. Charles was a good rugby player in the Ashburton region, playing for Rakaia and later for Petone in Wellington. The newspapers would often describe him as a “half-caste Zulu”. He largely went by the name ‘Ted’ and after moving to Australia to pursue a boxing career he fought under the name of ‘Sam Kauri’. He also played two games for North Sydney in the New South Wales Rugby League competition.

Frank was born two and a half years after the death of Anselmo and had no father's name recorded on his birth registration. His mother remarried in 1920 to Charles Thomas Pudney.

== Playing career ==
=== Rugby union ===
==== Waitanguru and Maniapoto ====
It appears that Pickrang moved from Wellington sometime around the start of 1935 and aged 20 began playing senior rugby for the newly formed Waitanguru club in the King Country competition. Their section of the competition was in the Maniapoto sub union. His first match in their black and green jerseys was against Pio Pio on May 12, 1935. His side lost 13-8 and with him being new to the area he was described as “a tigerish Islander in the forwards”. He played in a match with Ōtorohanga on May 19, and then against Old Boys a week later was said to have “again played a splendid game, and was probably the best forward on Rugby Park”. Against Waitere on June 1 Craig “and Pickrang – Waitanguru's second star forward – collared clean around the ankles, and many a Waitere player can vouch how effective this tackling, so seldom seen here, was last Saturday”. He played further matches against Hangatiki, Te Kūiti, and Ōtorohanga and was regularly having his fine play commented on. Before the Maniapoto representative side was picked it was said in the King Country Chronicle that “it will take very strong opposition to oust Pickrang out of a place”. He was duly selected in the second row for the Maniapoto side to play against Ōhura on June 29. In the team was also Len Kawe, the Māori All Black who would also later play with Pickrang at Manukau rugby league club. Maniapoto won 6 to 3 at Te Kūiti. Pickrang was said to have “sent his backs away” early in the second half after breaking away with the ball at his feet. He set his backs away again after taking a kick and at the end of the movement McLeod scored what turned out to be the winning try. J. Craig was said to be their best forward but was well supported by Davis and Pickrang.

He played further matches for Waitanguru against Waitete and Te Kuiti in July before being picked again to play for Maniapoto to play against Waipa. In the side with him was Angus Gault who would also later convert to rugby league and play with Pickrang for New Zealand. Maniapoto won 6-3 with Pickrang and Gault “particularly good in the tight work”. On July 27 he played in the green and white of Maniapoto for the third time, this time against Kawhia. He played in the second row once more in a 25 to 6 win. He played one more match for Waitanguru against Hangatiki on August 3 before he was selected for King Country.

==== King Country ====
Pickrang was not initially named to play in his representative debut for the King Country match with Waikato but he came in as a replacement. King Country were defeated 20-19 at Rugby Park in Te Kūiti on August 10. He did “good work” along with Kemp, Craig, and Nelson in the forwards but their scrum and line out struggled. A week later on August 17 he was playing for the sub union representative side of Maniapoto again in a Peace Cup match with Matamata on their opponents rain soaked ground. They were defeated on fulltime by Matamata 12-11 who retained the trophy. During the first half Pickrang scored a try when “Evans dribbled on [following a break] and served Pickrang for the latter to score a fine try” after thrusting his way over the line. Pickrang was then chosen to tour with King Country on their short trip to play Thames Valley at Paeroa and Bay of Plenty at Tauranga. King Country defeated Thames Valley 22 to 16 “after a bright, open game”. They played Bay of Plenty on August 29 at the Tauranga Domain and won 22-17 with “Kemp, Pickrang and Bradshaw … conspicuous in the forwards”.

Just 2 days later Pickrang was busy for Waitanguru in a match against Te Kuiti. He scored four tries in a 25 to 15 win. The first came after Craig made an opening and he took a pass to score between the posts. The second after he broke “from the side of the pack” and ran over. The third occurred after “following through”, and the fourth when he ran in support of Phillips who had broken through and took a pass from him. He was then selected to play for King Country again against Taranaki Colts on September 7. Taranaki won the match, played at the Taumarunui Domain before a crowd of 1000 by 13 points to 8 with Pickrang in the second row. Pickrang's final game of the season came on September 28 for King Country against the Hawkes Bay Colts. The match was played at the Ohakune Domain and saw the Hawke's Bay Colts side run out 20-12 winners. King Country played poorly and it was said “the King Country forwards were not much better than a club team. Nelson and Pickrang were the pick of them”.

=== Rugby league ===
==== Move to Manukau rugby league club in Auckland ====
At some point following the end of the 1935 season Pickrang moved to Auckland to play for Manukau in the Auckland Rugby League competition. Manukau had been granted senior grade status for the first time in many years and recruited a large number of rugby representatives from around the country including Pickrang. He made his debut on May 2, 1936, for Manukau against Devonport United (North Shore Albions) on the Carlaw Park number 2 field. Manukau were outclassed 27 to 2 though with so many players new to rugby league it was generally thought that they showed positive signs. The Auckland Star said “Pickrang (14st. 8lbs) is a most rugged sort” and along with Angus Gault was “splendid”. His second match of rugby league was against Richmond Rovers and saw Manukau with a 14-8 upset win over the reigning champions. It was said that “[Len] Kawe and Pickrang stood out in the forwards, the latter playing an inspired game”. He scored a try in the win after snapping “up in the loose to score a fine try” and was “easily the best forward on the ground”. The New Zealand Herald wrote: “the outstanding forward was Pickering (sic), a solidly built Māori, whose following up and fine tackling were a feature of the game. Pickering handles well and showed excellent control of the ball in dribbling rushes”. The King Country Chronicle had noticed that Pickrang had moved to Auckland and joined the league code. They quoted from the Herald's report and said “Pickrang has evidently Anglicised his name for Auckland's benefit, but the photograph soon dispels any doubt that it is indeed the smiling “Pick” known to Maniapoto who is so specially mentioned”. The following week he scored again in a 24–18 loss to Ponsonby United. Then in their round 4 win over City Rovers 22-20 he was said to be “good in the rucking”. Against Mount Albert the Auckland Star said “of the forwards Pickrang was outstanding, and was probably the best ruckman on the ground. He lent any amount of weight in the pack and was always chasing the ball”. There was doubt that he would be able to play in the next match with Marist Old Boys but he arrived just as an emergency player was about to take the field. Manukau won easily by 39 points to 18.

==== Auckland Māori and Auckland selection ====
His form had impressed the selectors enough to be chosen in early June to train with the Auckland Māori side in preparation for their game with Auckland on Kings Birthday later in the month. Against Newton Rangers on June 13 he was said to once again be “the best forward on the ground”, and he scored a try after he combined with Len Kawe and Proctor to help secure a 15–14 victory. And again against Devonport United on June 20 Pickrang “stood out as the best forward on the ground, his all-round play being one of the features of the game”. He was then named in the starting side to make his rugby league representative debut against Auckland in the second row. The Auckland Māori team won 30 points to 21. Pickrang stood out in the forwards along with Steve Watene, Kawe, and Minnix. Pickrang scored early in the match after gathering the ball from a loose scrum and scoring near the posts to narrow the score to 8-5 after Auckland led early. Following the Round 9 loss to Richmond 27-11 Pickrang was selected to train in an Auckland squad to prepare for the English team which was touring later in the season. His weight was listed in the selection list as being 13 stone 12 pounds. He then played in another match for Manukau against Ponsonby which was won 14-12.

==== North Island selection ====
Pickrang was then named by selector, Bert Avery, in the North Island side to play against the South Island in their annual inter-island fixture. He was chosen to play in the front row at prop alongside Jack Satherley of the Richmond club at hooker and Joe Coutts (Wellington) in the other prop position. The match was played at Carlaw Park before a crowd of 15,000 with the North Island winning 21 to 16. The Auckland Star stated that “Pickrang and Coutts were the best of the North pack”. While the New Zealand Herald singled out Pickrang and Harold Tetley as the best forwards. At one point in the second half he broke away and after a “passing bout” Lou Brown scored to make the score 19 to 8. The Herald wrote a short piece on Pickrang which said “the outstanding forward for the North Island was Pickrang. He was with the play all the time, tackled splendidly, and proved a great asset to the side in going down and checking the strong rushes of the opposing pack”. They also named him in what they thought the New Zealand side to play England might be.

After a match for Manukau against City Rovers which Pickrang's side won 10-6 on July 18 Pickrang was selected in the Auckland team to play against England which was on their way having completed their tour of Australia. Pickrang was chosen in the second row alongside Steve Watene with Harold Tetley at lock. The newspapers reported that Pickrang had played “some outstanding games in club football”. The match was played on Carlaw Park on July 25 in fine conditions but on a heavy field after recent rain. The crowd was estimated at 14,000 and they witnessed the English side win 22 to 16. Pickrang was involved in Auckland's first try which, after the conversion, gave them a 7-0 lead. He headed a chase and when [Jim] Brough was tackled in possession [Harold] Tetley “snapped up the ball and passed to J Breed” who scored.

==== New Zealand selection and debut ====
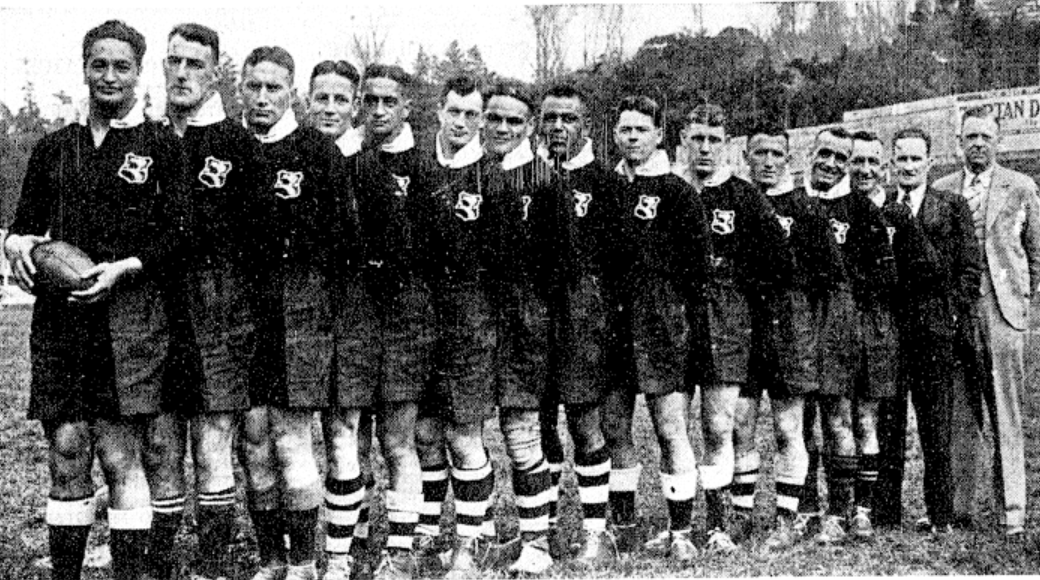
The New Zealand team prior to the first test v England in 1936. Pickrang is in the centre, 8th from the left.

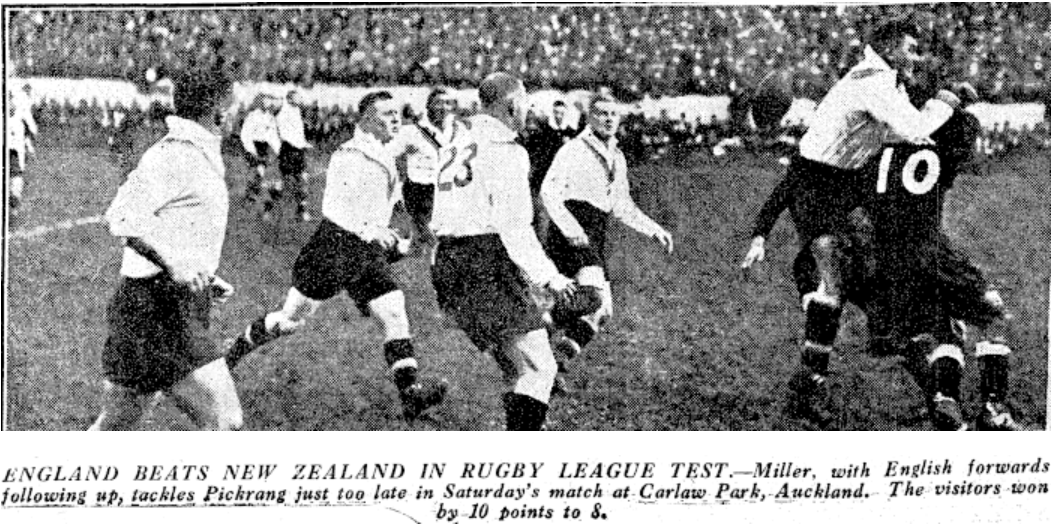

After the Auckland match with England, Pickrang returned to the Manukau side to play against Mount Albert on August 1. He scored a try and played “a great all-round game” in an 11-9 win. The Herald again wrote a piece on Pickrang's play saying “an outstanding feature of the match was the great all-round game played by Pickrang in the Manukau vanguard. He was always in the picture on attack or defence and his tackling was excellent”. He was then named by selectors Thomas McClymont, Jim Amos, and Bert Avery to make his New Zealand debut against England at the age of just 21 which was very rare for a forward to be so youthful. He was picked to play in the second row with Billy Glynn. The Auckland Star said that “Pickrang is the best forward in Auckland”.

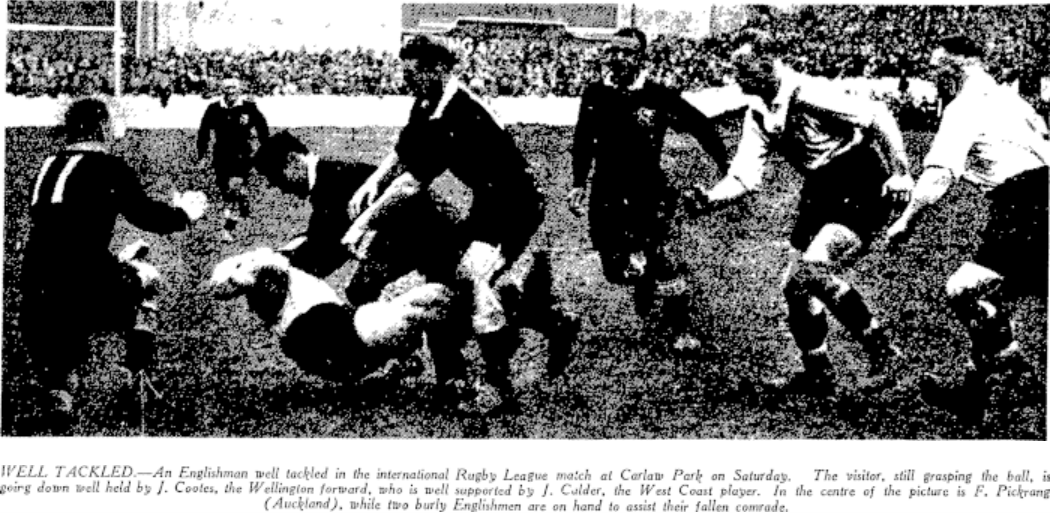

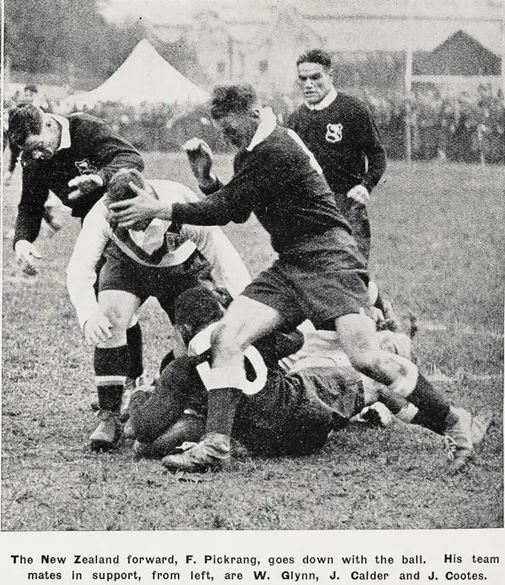

The first test (of 2) was played at Carlaw Park on August 8. New Zealand went down narrowly by 10 points to 8 with Pickrang said to have “played a magnificent game”. Early in the test with New Zealand “harassing” England Pickrang broke away, but Roy Powell was smothered when a try looked possible”. He “repeatedly led the home forwards, who did fine work in the loose”, and was involved with Powell again before [Bill] McNeight, [Jim] Calder and [Steve] Watene became involved and just missed a try during the first half. The Herald said “in fine set of forwards Pickrang stood out for a great all-round game. His fast raiding and splendid tackling were of advantage to the team.

Unsurprisingly Pickrang was named in the second test to be played again at Carlaw Park on August 15. This time he would partner Joe Cootes in the second row. England won more convincingly in “ideal” conditions by 23 points to 11. After the match the English players were “unanimous” in selecting Pickrang as the best New Zealand forward they came across on the tour. He was involved in a break with Arthur Kay, Watene, and Cootes but a “certain try was lost”. The Herald remarked that “the New Zealand tackling was often weak and it was Pickrang and Cootes who showed the correct way to tackle. Unlike some of the other players they never attempted to go high, but made certain of bringing an opponent down with hard, low tackling”. He was “the outstanding forward and he was well supported by Cootes”.

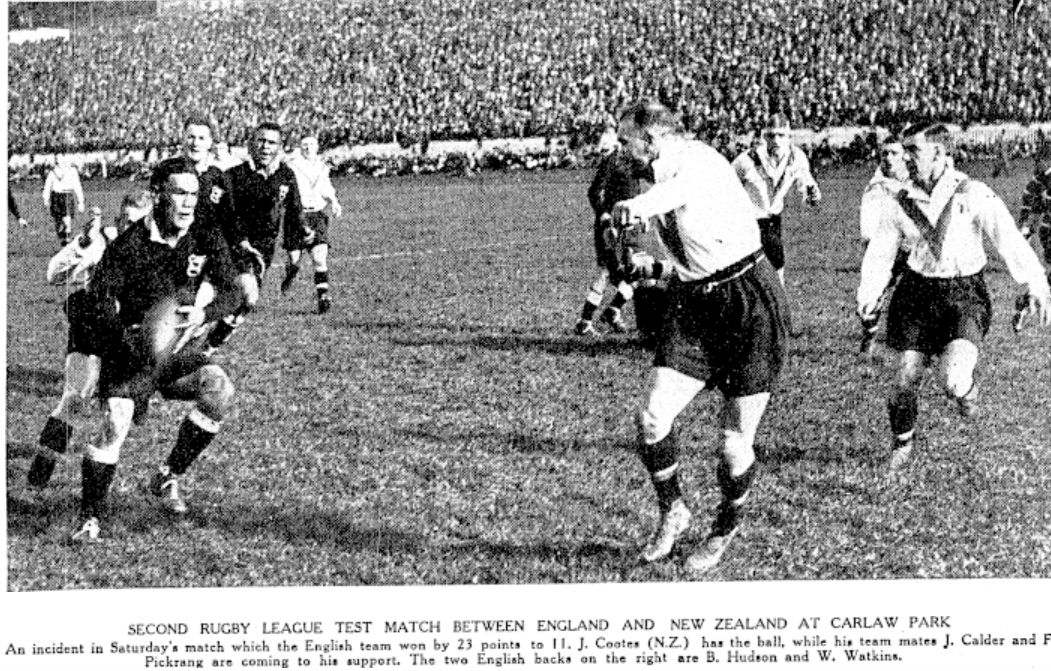

After the test he returned to the Manukau side to finish the season, playing in 5 matches for them. The first was in atrocious weather on August 22 with Manukau winning 24-7 over Marist Old Boys. He then made the unusual appearance at five eighth in a 26–6 win over Newton Rangers. He scored a try and was said to have been "outstanding". This win secured Manukau a rather remarkable Fox Memorial Shield championship win by winning the first grade championship in their first season in first grade for many years with a team made from many rugby players. The Herald remarked “in Pickrang and Gault, Manukau has two of the best forwards seen in Auckland for some years, and players likely to gain high honours next season. Pickrang has already made a good impression and was the outstanding forward for New Zealand in the matches against England.

Manukau then began their Roope Rooster knockout tournament with a 10-8 win over Ponsonby. It was said he "was the outstanding forward. His tackling was the best seen for some time at Carlaw Park". He missed their 18-8 win over Papakura but returned to the side to play in the final against City Rovers. Manukau won by 23 points to 10 to claim their second piece of silverware for the season. Pickrang “was in every movement, and stood out for great tackling”. Their last game of the season came on October 3 against Richmond Rovers in the Stormont Shield final which was played between the championship winners and Roope Rooster winner (or runner up in the championship). Manukau went down by 30 points to 9. Jack Brodrick and Pickrang “were the best forwards on the ground and did a lot of useful work”.

At the conclusion of the season at the annual Auckland Rugby League trophy night Pickrang was presented with the (Dickson) medal for the most popular senior player.

==== Move to Ponsonby United ====
In April 1937, Pickrang's name appeared in the newspaper to play in Manukau's senior side for their preseason match on April 24 with Newton Rangers however he did not play. He was also named in their side to play North Shore Albions on May 1. He continued to be named in their sides but there was no mention of him in any match reports. Then on June 26 he was named to play for Ponsonby United but all the matches were cancelled due to poor weather. It was reported on June 30 that he had been trying to move to Ponsonby for some time but was “standing down” due to difficulties with the transfer which had been approved by Auckland Rugby League. His debut came against City Rovers on July 3 in a 27–8 win. He played well and was said to be amongst the forwards after team mate Edgar Morgan. On July 16 he was listed amongst the 25 players nominated by Jim Rukutai, Ernie Asher, and Rev. Wiremu Netana Panapa. The following week against Richmond Pickrang was “outstanding” and scored a try after pressuring George Tittleton and gaining possession.

==== New Zealand squad selection ====
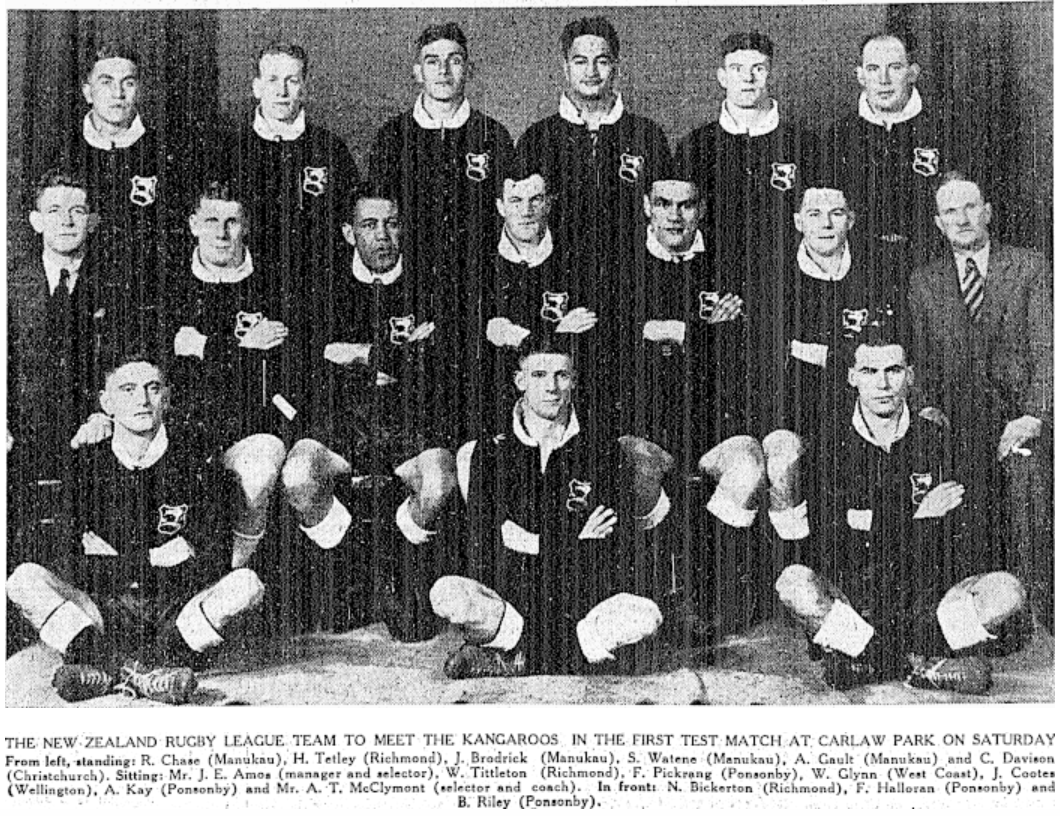

Following an 18-6 loss to his former Manukau side on 24 July Pickrang was named in the New Zealand ‘Possibles’ side to play in a trial match with the Australian side touring later. The trial was played in muddy conditions at Carlaw Park with the Possibles side winning 25 to 11 though Pickrang was not mentioned in any match report.

Following a match for Ponsonby against Mount Albert United on 31 July Pickrang was named in the New Zealand squad to play Australia in the first test. Eight backs and seven forwards were named. In a review of the side in the New Zealand Herald it was said that “Pickrang may be the player left out, seeing he has only taken part in six games this year, and has not yet shown the high class form of last season in the tests with the Englishmen”. The Auckland Star reported that it was “doubtful whether F. Pickrang, whose shoulder has been causing trouble will be available”. It was said that he would “undergo a medical examination” on the afternoon of August 5 which was just 2 days out from the test. The following day it was reported that he was unavailable owing to his injury and his place was taken by Jack McLeod.

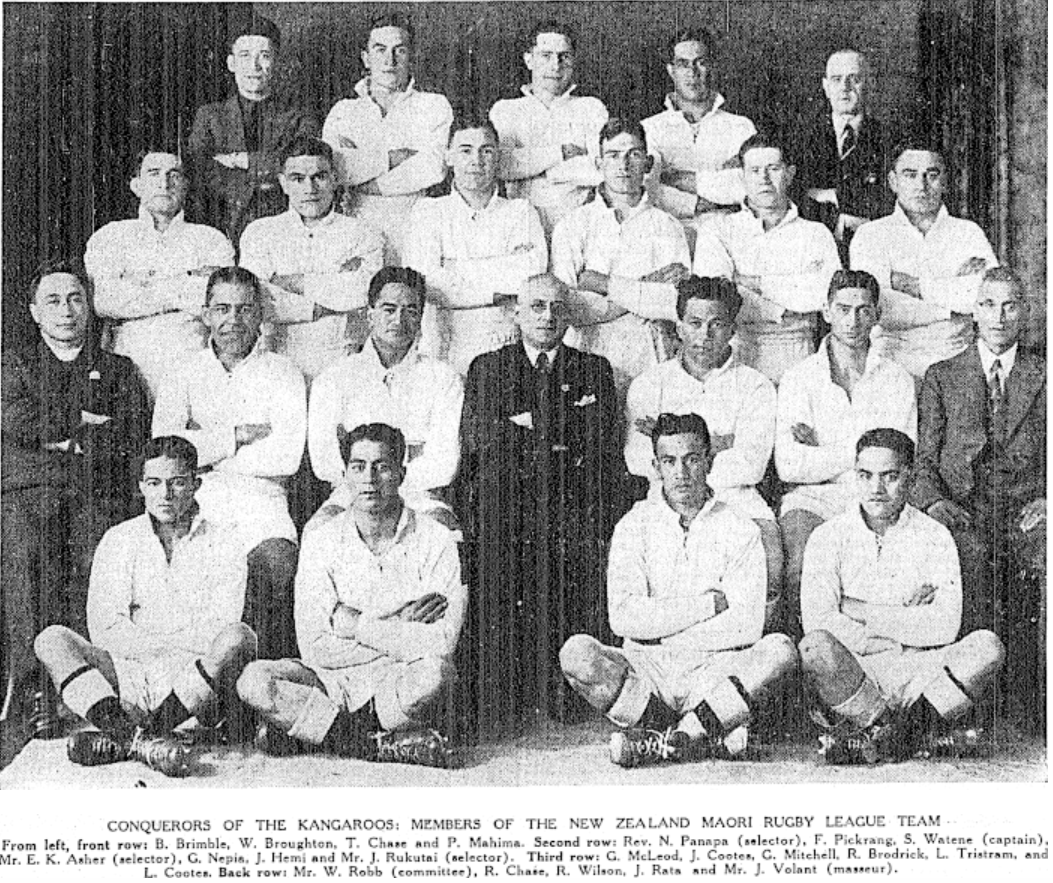

Pickrang was next named to play in the New Zealand Māori squad to take on Australia, and was one of eight forwards named. The Ladies Committee of the Auckland Rugby League held a ball at the Peter Pan venue on the evening of August 11 which the Australian side attended with Pickrang also present. He didn't play in the Māori side and was not to appear in a match again until August 21 for Ponsonby against North Shore which Ponsonby won 23-9. He kicked a rare conversion in a friendly match with Huntly which was played at Swanson on August 28 to go with a try. He played in Ponsonby's 23-21 win over North Shore in the first round of the Roope Rooster, and in their semi final win over Mount Albert he “stood out as the most impressive forward in the game”. He also scored a try in the match which saw a 21-10 score in their favour. They lost the final to Marist Old Boys 25-10 though he was said to have “played a good game”.

Pickrang was named in the New Zealand Māori squad to play Auckland though like all the other representative squads he had been named in he did not ultimately play.

==== Final season in Auckland ====
In April, 1938 it was thought that Pickrang would again be turning out for Auckland as he was discussed in the preseason amongst Ponsonby's prospects. However he didn't ultimately play until their Round 8 match on June 4 against Marist. It was said that he was “always in the picture” in a match they lost 13-7. After a July 2 match against City which Ponsonby lost 5-3 it was said “Pickrang gave a lesson in tactics to his team-mates, keeping the ball at toe in effective loose rushed, but the only time he received full support was the occasion when Ponsonby scored its only try”. He then played against Papakura the following weekend in what was to be his last appearance for Ponsonby. He was missing from the side to play North Shore on July 23 and not mentioned again for the rest of the season.

==== Move to Whangārei ====
It is possible that Pickrang had stopped playing for Ponsonby as he had moved to Northland Region at some point after his last game for them. On April 28 in an advertisement in The Northern Advocate for the Northland competition it was said “See City's recruit, F. Pickrang, N.Z. Rep., in action”. His clearance came through on May 3 to the City club which was based in Whangārei and had won the competition the previous season. He was supposed to make his debut on April 29 against Hikurangi in a preseason match but due to poor weather the match was pushed back to May 6. Hikurangi won at Jubilee Park in Whangarei and the Northern Advocate reported that “Pickerang (sic), well-built breakaway from Manukau and ex-New Zealand representative, was always to the fore, and found a good partner in Len Payne…”. City had been depleted by “influenza and absences from the district” and began the match with just 11 players. He next played for City against Kamo on May 20. He played again on May 27 against Kensington and scored a try which he converted in a 24–0 win at Jubilee Park. His try came after he followed up fast on a kick by Bradley “to fall on the ball as it rolled under the posts”. During the following week in comments about the match it was said “in the pack, Pickrang played his usual tricky game, and it is evident that the side has benefited much already from his coaching”. He was then named in the B Team in a Northland representative trial match to be played the following day (Sunday) at Hikurangi. The match was played to help the selectors choose the Northland team to play Taranaki at Carlaw Park in Auckland. In the trial match he played at loose forward but it was reported that “Len Payne and Pickrang several times came out of the pack to join in with the backs, and Pickrang's methods of fooling the opposition with his side-steps and dummies moved the gallery to mirth”. The score finished 8-all.

His next match was for a combined City-Portland against the Papakura side from Auckland with Pickrang being named to captain the combination. Papakura won the match at Jubilee Park on June 3 by 21 points to 12. The Papakura side featured former All Black Harold Milliken. Pickrang received an ankle injury in the first half which caused a “long stoppage while [he] received attention” and he was “much subdued” for the rest of the match. He was however involved in a try when he “secured to send Vince Payne over” which made the score 16-6 to the visitors. A second trial match was played the following day which Pickrang had initially been named to play in but is unlikely to have given his ankle injury.

==== Northland appearance ====
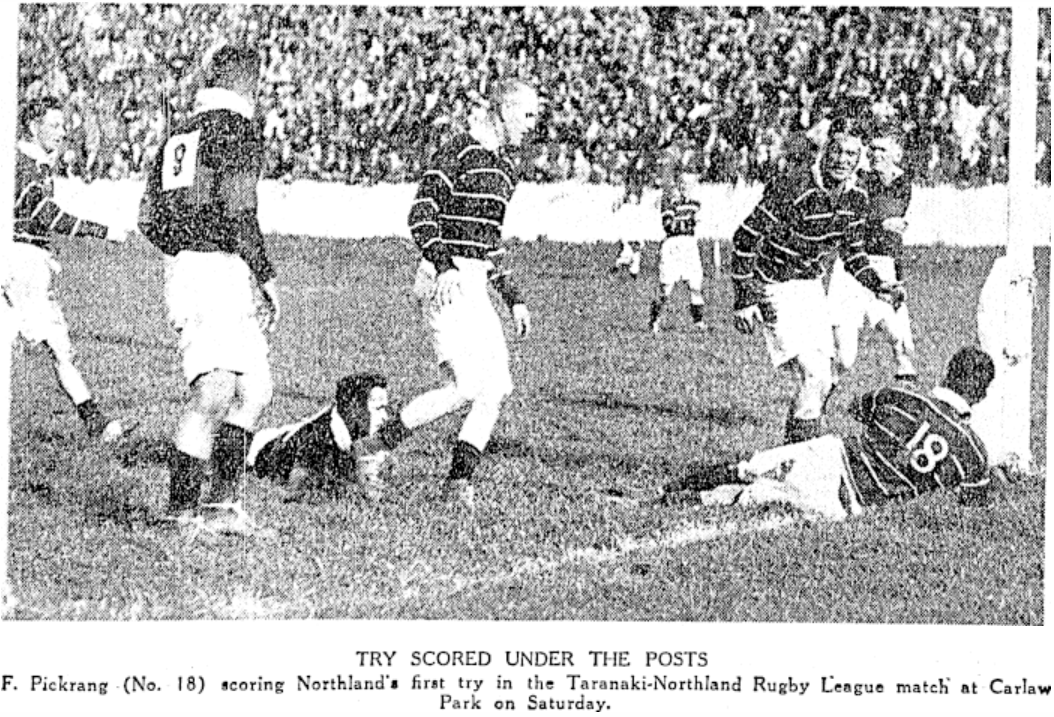

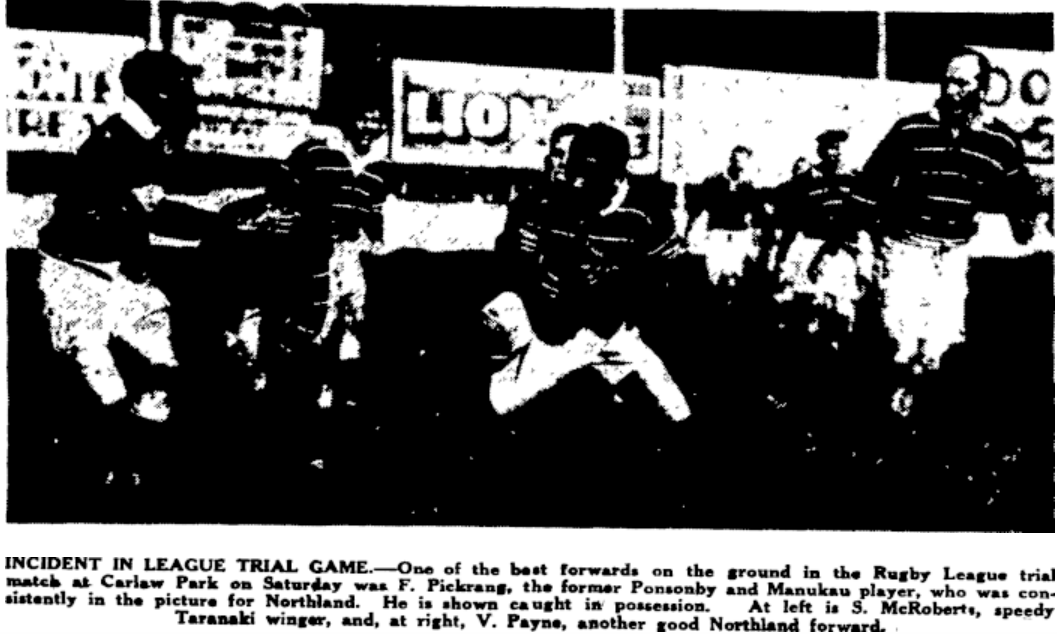
Pickrang with the ball during the game.

Following the trial matches Pickrang was named in the Northland squad to play Taranaki at Carlaw Park. The team travelled to Auckland on the Saturday morning and went down 29 points to 13 with Pickrang scoring a try. The Auckland Star said “F. Pickrang, the former Ponsonby and Manukau forward, was one of the best forwards on the ground, and from first to last he was going great guns for Northland. A photograph of Pickrang's try was published in the New Zealand Herald with him playing on the ball next to the right hand upright at the northern end of Carlaw Park. The Herald also stated he “showed some of his old-time form, and was the outstanding Northland forward”. The Northern Advocate said “he was a “worrier” all the way, in the scoring list, and made openings which only occasionally were profited by”. He then returned to Whangārei and played for City against Portland on July 8. This was to be his last game of rugby league.

== World War 2 enlistment ==
=== 8th Field Company Engineers ===
On May 9 Pickrang's name appeared on a list of men who were moving from Auckland to Trentham on Thursday, May 16 after parading at Drill Hall the evening prior.

=== Central rugby league club, Wellington ===
It was reported that while he was at Trentham he had been granted a conditional transfer to play rugby league in the Wellington competition while in training in the region. The application was made on his behalf by the Central club. He was listed in the Central squad to play Petone on July 20. Petone won the match 18-8 but it is unknown is Pickrang played as there was no match report. He was next listed in the squad for Central's match with Randwick on August 17. Again though, there was very little reporting of matches and it is unknown if he played or not.

=== Enlistment and service details ===
At the time that Pickrang enlisted he was living at Flat 4, 6 Grenside Crescent in central Auckland. His occupation at the time was listed as “bootmaker/civilian”. He was a sapper in the Second New Zealand Expeditionary Force” and embarked on July 1, 1941, after completing his training at Trentham, arriving on September 30. During the war Frank's brother Ansell who had also gone to fight had been wounded whilst serving as a driver in Libya.

Frank returned from the war in early September and returned by train from Wellington to Auckland on Friday, September 7. It was said that he was of Te Kūiti, which is where his wife was living in Waiteti Valley when he enlisted.

Pickrang returned to New Zealand with a very good photographic collection of the war. It is held by the National Library of New Zealand and is "relating to his service with the New Zealand Engineers, Second New Zealand Expeditionary Force (2NZEF) in North Africa, the Middle East and Italy during World War Two".

== Return to rugby ==
=== Pinedale and Putaruru ===
After his return from the war Pickrang rejoined the rugby union code. There was relatively little rugby league played in smaller provincial areas of New Zealand at this time and during the war both the rugby league and rugby union authorities were much more flexible with which code they allowed their registered players to play in. Pickrang was first mentioned as playing in a cricket match for Pinedale against Arapuni in late November, 1945. He took 1 wicket for 38, and also took a catch to go with 5 runs in their first innings 99 run loss. He continued to play for Pinedale cricket side, including in a match in mid December against Putāruru.

His first rugby match was for Pinedale against Tokoroa, now at the age of 31. The match finished 3-3 with Pickrang involved in several moments. He played again on June 1 against Arapuni and scored both their tries in a 6–3 win. The first came after "hard play in a loose scrum saw Pickrang secure the ball to go over", while his second came after "a few minutes forward play gave Pickrang another chance, which resulted in Pinedale's second try". The Putaruru Press reported that "the Pinedale forwards were fortunate in having Pickrang as break-away". Against Ātiamuri on June 15 he scored 3 tries in a 17–0 win. After the game he was chosen in the North side to play the South side in a Putaruru trial at Karl's Paddock. He was then picked in another trial match to play on July 6 at Cambridge at Memorial Park for Putaruru A against Cambridge. The match finished 3-3 with Pickrang involved in a couple of attacking movements which nearly resulted in tries. After a match for Pinedale against Tokoroa on July 7 Pickrang was again chosen to play for Putaruru against Cambridge.

He played again for the Putaruru representative side on July 23 in a match against Cambridge at Glenshea Park in Putaruru. Cambridge won by 9 points to 3 in good weather though rain had fallen the previous night and "a fog kept the grass damp". In the first half after a scrum "Pickrang, who was breaking very fast for Putaruru, secured the ball, sold a perfect dummy, and pierced the defence in characteristic style", then Cambridge made an infringement which saw Balfour kick a penalty to narrow the score to 6-3 in favour of Cambridge. Cambridge kicked a penalty to make the score 9-3 and then Pickrang had to leave the field with an injury. Despite his injury just days later on July 27 he turned out for Pinedale in a match against Huia. Pinedale won the game 15 to 6 with Pickrang scoring a try in each half.

In 1948 he was selected on to the management committee of the United club in Putaruru and as a delegate to the rugby union.

== Personal life and death ==
On May 4, 1937, Frank married Moana Maata Hetet. They had five children, Francis (Frank), Colleene, Noel Ansel Murray, Mary, and Edward. Noel (Butch), who was born on January 21, 1948, played representative rugby for New Zealand Māori at fullback in 1971, 1973, and 1976 in 12 matches scoring 62 points. He also played for Waikato from 1970-72 (after also playing for the Putaruru club), Otago in 1973 and 1975, and the South Island side in 1973. He later went on to coach the Thames Valley side in the Heartland championship.

After returning from the war and moving to the Putāruru area his son (Francis) Edward won a prize at the children's fancy dress ball in Putaruru at the Civic Theatre. His ‘dress’ was as a “Māori Boy” in the 6-10 age group. Frank was working as a driver and living on Buckland Street in Putaruru at the time.

In February, 1947 Pickrang was fined £2, 10s in costs for exceeding the speed limit by the Magistrates Court in Putaruru. He was charged with driving at 47 miles per hour while “driving [a] heavy motor vehicle”. On May 20, 1947, Pickrang was fined £10 by Mr. S. L. Paterson, S.M., at Putaruru “for using explosives to kill trout in the Waihou River” whilst employed as a truck driver. There was a second charge of “taking fish without being the holder of a current license” which he was convicted of and discharged. Herbert Edward Garlick, a sawmill worker was charged with aiding Pickrang in committing the offences and fined 10s. Then in March, 1950 he was charged with a driving offence from April 17, 1949. He “was fined £4 and costs for driving a heavy motor vehicle on the main road, Putaruru, at 45 miles per hour”. It was said to be his “third conviction in 12 months”.

The electoral rolls of 1949 stated that he was still living on Buckland Street with his wife Moana Maata Pickrang, who was registered on the same roll. On September 14, 1950, Frank and his wife Moana had a notice published in the Putaruru Press stating “if a certain person at Wiltsdown does not cease spreading malicious and untrue statements immediately, proceedings will be taken. (Signed) M. & F. Pickrang”. By the 1950s Pickrang was working as a scrap metal dealer in Putāruru and was a declared bankrupt. In 1957 he and Moana were living at 32 Marchant Street in Putāruru and was still working as a driver.

Frank's wife Moana died on February 25, 1958, aged just 42. He moved to live in the Taupō area for a time in the 1960s before moving back to 32 Marchant Street in Putāruru in the 1970s. He was living there in 1972 and still working as a driver, by now aged 57. His son Noel Pickrang was also living in Putāruru also and working as a Bushman. He continued to live on Marchant Street in Putāruru throughout the 1970s though was recorded as working as a labourer by 1978. On the 1981 electoral roll he was retired while one of his sons, Francis (Frank) Edward Pickrang, was working as a quarry manager in the area.

Frank sr. died on May 23, 1998, aged 83. He was buried at the Putaruru New Public Cemetery, Domain Road, in Putaruru.

His eldest son Francis (Frank) Edward Charles Pickrang died in 2018 aged 81 and had a death notice published in the New Zealand Herald. It stated that he was “big brother to Colleene, Noel, Mary and Edward.
