= Angus Gault =

NZ international rugby league player

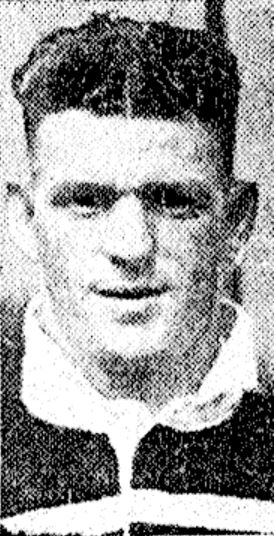

Personal information
- Full name: Angus Tait Gault
- Born: 30 May 1912 Aviemore, Scotland
- Died: 23 September 1983 (aged 71) Auckland, New Zealand

Playing information
- Weight: 12 st 8 lb (80 kg)

Rugby union
- Position: Loose forward
Club
| Years | Team | Pld | T | G | FG | P |
|---|---|---|---|---|---|---|
| 1932–35 | Hangatiki | 40 | 5 | 0 | 0 | 15 |
| 1934 | Druids and Foresters | 1 | 0 | 0 | 0 | 0 |
| | Total | 41 | 5 | 0 | 0 | 15 |
Representative
| Years | Team | Pld | T | G | FG | P |
| 1932–35 | Maniapoto | 6 | 2 | 0 | 0 | 6 |
| 1932 | Country (Maniapoto) | 1 | 0 | 0 | 0 | 0 |

Rugby league
- Position: Prop, Second-row, Wing
Club
| Years | Team | Pld | T | G | FG | P |
|---|---|---|---|---|---|---|
| 1936–39 | Manukau | 64 | 17 | 0 | 0 | 51 |
Representative
| Years | Team | Pld | T | G | FG | P |
| 1936–38 | Auckland | 7 | 1 | 0 | 0 | 3 |
| 1936 | Auckland Trial | 1 | 1 | 0 | 0 | 3 |
| 1937 | New Zealand Trial | 1 | 0 | 0 | 0 | 0 |
| 1937–38 | New Zealand | 4 (2) | 0 | 0 | 0 | 0 |
| 1938 | North Island | 1 | 1 | 0 | 0 | 3 |
| 1939 | Auckland Pākehā | 1 | 0 | 0 | 0 | 0 |
- Source: Papers Past, Rugby League Project, Trove, Ancestry.com As of 13 Dec 2023

Angus Tait Gault (30 May 1912 – November 1983) was a rugby league player. He represented the New Zealand rugby league team in four matches in 1937 and 1938. In the process he became the 251st player to represent New Zealand. He played rugby union in the Waitomo area for Hangatiki, and represented Maniapoto in the early-to-mid-1930s before moving to Auckland and playing rugby league for the Manukau club. He went on to represent Auckland, Auckland Pākehā, the North Island, and ultimately New Zealand.

== Early life ==
Angus Gault was born on 30 May 1912, in Aviemore, Scotland. His parents were William Gault (1871–1958) and Agnes Henderson Tait (1879–1918). He had 6 siblings, William Gault (1905–1977), Robert G Gault (1906–?), Alexander Gault (1910–?), Hugh McCallum Gault (1916–?), Agnes Tait Gault (1918–2011), and Elizabeth Margaret Gault (1918–?). Mother Agnes appears to have died giving birth to twins Agnes and Elizabeth as her date of death was 6 July 1918, the same day the twins were born. The death and births occurred in Aviemore, Inverness-shire, Scotland.

Angus came to New Zealand aged 16 in 1928. He departed Southampton, England on 8 November on board the Tamaroa and was said to be a farmer on his shipping records. His older brother by 7 years, William, also emigrated. The first mention of Angus Gault in any of the New Zealand newspapers was on 29 August 1931, in the Waikato Independent. He attended a fancy dress dance at Karapiro Hall in the Waikato and won the waltz dance along with Miss V. McLeod.

In 1932 he competed in several athletic events in the Waikato and Bay of Plenty region. The first reported one was the Mamaku Sports Club meeting on 20 February. Mamaku is a small village on the Mamaku Plateau in the Bay of Plenty. He entered the 100 yards, 120 yards, and 440 yard races. Then in late March he ran in the 110 yard, 440 yard, 880 yard races at the Te Kuiti Friendly Societies' Sports Club meeting. He finished the summer athletic meetings when he competed in the Otorohanga Sports Club even on Easter Monday when he ran in the 100 yard, 220 yard, and 880 yard races.

== Playing career ==
=== Rugby union in the King Country ===
==== 1932 ====
It is unclear exactly when Angus Gault began playing rugby union for Hangatiki. He was in the side which played against Pio Pio on 7 May 1932. The blue and black of Hangatiki lost 21–0. Then on 14 May on the Te Kūiti Domain in a 8–3 loss to Te Kuiti, Gault played a "good game". Gault played in matches against Mangapehi (21 May), Athletic (28 May), and then Toko on 4 June. His form in the loose forwards caught the eye of the selectors and he was chosen as one of the forward reserves for the Maniapoto representative side. Maniapoto was a sub union of the King Country province. The side was to play Ōtorohanga on 11 June at Ōtorohanga. Gault came on at the half time break to replace Brown, with Maniapoto who were leading 14-0 and went on to win 29–0. He next played in Hangatiki's 23–6 loss to Pio Pio on 18 June before they played Te Kuiti on 25 June. Gault's specific play was mentioned for the first time in the Te Kuiti match which Hangatiki won 6–3, when it was said that "Gault was doing good work in the loose…", "J. Nikora came through, and when he was collared the forwards headed by Gault, carried on the good work, and got almost across the line…". Weather had disrupted the season around this point considerably and Gault did not play again until 9 July when he was chosen for a Country side to play a Town side in the Maniapoto Sub-union. Gault finished the season with a game for Hangatiki against Mangapehi and was not named in their final matches of the season against Athletic and Toko. His brother William was playing during the year for the Otorohanga side in the same region.

==== 1933 ====
The 1933 season began with Gault playing in the opening round match between Hangatiki and Te Kuiti on the newly opened domain ground on 6 May. His following matches were against Pio Pio then Nehe at Rugby Park with Hangatiki winning 8 to 3. He played in matches against Mangapehi on 10 June, and Te Kuiti on 17 June and was then selected in the Maniapoto sub union representative side to start. The match was played on 24 June against Otorohanga for the Carlsen Cup. His 28-year-old brother, William was on the opposition Otorohanga side. Maniapoto who wore green and white could only manage a 6–6 draw against the black and white of Otorohanga which meant that the later side retained the Carlson Cup.

He returned to his Hangatiki side to play against Pio Pio and Nehe on 1 and 8 July respectively. Gault was mentioned in their 6–3 win when "play centred midfield until Gault, Davis and Grey led the blue pack into the yellow territory where a nice kick by the defenders enabled Trench to follow up fast and catch the Blue full-back in possession". Late in the match with the score 3-3 Gault "suffered a temporary injury" but was able to play on and Hangatiki scored to win. The King Country Chronicle said "Gault, Davis, Hare and Wiske were worthy of mention". In Hangatiki's 29 July match against Te Kuiti, lost 31–6, Gault played an outstanding game. He broke through Te Kuiti but was tackled "just in time" by J. Barlow, then he was involved in "a loose dribbling rush" with Irvine. The King Country saying at this point that he "was playing a really great game". Later Hangatiki scored to make it 11–6 with "Gault's work responsible for a score". Following a game with Mangapehi on 5 August Gault was selected in the forwards for Maniapoto to play Tainui on 12 August. The match was played on the coast and was drawn 3-3. Gault was reported to be one of the "most effective forwards" for Maniapoto along with Koroheke, Hare, and Andrews. Two weeks later the same teams met again for the return match at Rugby Park with Gault again selected in the loose forwards. Maniapoto won 27–5 with Gault "doing good work" in the forwards. He was later mentioned for defensive work and then he came close to scoring in the second half. His final game of the season was for Hangatiki against Te Kuiti in the Pukeweka Shield final on 2 September. The match was also being played as a benefit match for P. Davis who had badly fractured his leg playing for Hangatiki earlier in the season and had been in hospital since. Te Kuiti won 17 to 11 with Gault mentioned after coming away with the ball from a lineout after some "hard skirmishing". A while later he and Riddle burst away but it amounted to nothing.

==== 1934 ====
In 1934 Gault was elected on to the Hangatiki club's social committee for their "Waitomo" sector. The club also had a Hangatiki sector. Gault's first match of the season was for Hangatiki against Te Kuiti on 28 April. Hangatiki were well beaten 34-0 although at one stage "Gault made a spectacular burst to be caught just short of the line". He played in games against United on 5 May and Nehe on 12 May. In the latter match he was mentioned as playing well in the forwards though he "missed a fairly easy shot at goal" late in the match in an 11–3 win. There was relatively little coverage of their matches during the season and Gault did not make any representative appearances. He did however play for the Druids and Foresters side against Oddfellows on 15 September in an annual match for the Le Quesnoy Banner. He was out of the forwards for the game with the King Country Chronicle remarking "Gault, trying his hand as a winger, was nothing if not impetuous". He was involved in their final try in an 18–8 win when he charged through before B. Barlow scored.

==== 1935 ====
The 1935 season was to be a busier one for Gault. He played 13 matches for Hangatiki and 2 for Maniapoto. It was to be his final season playing rugby in the King Country. He scored a try in their opening round loss to Te Kuiti on 4 May by 26 points to 6. He was mentioned several times in the newspaper with the Hangatiki forwards "led by Gault and Hislop, kept battling almost to the end". Gault's good work led to a try to Koroheke early in the match, with his own try coming soon after half time when he "battled a way through a melee and claimed a score". The paper also said that Gault was "fit and started off the season with a great burst of energy". He played games against Waitete, Te Awamutu, Pio Pio, and then Otorohanga on 1 June. He scored a try against Otorohanga after a "determined" effort with Hangatiki winning 11–8. It was noted at this point in the season that he was in the representative frame as he had been "playing very well for Hangatiki". Gault scored another try on 22 June in a 6–3 win over Waitete. He and Hislop were predominant in their forward pack. His try came after he "broke through the defence to score well out" and saw them secure the final lead. In an 8–6 loss to Pio Pio on 6 July he nearly scored twice but was denied by the defence each time.

Gault was then named in the Maniapoto side to play Waipā on Thursday, 18 July. Also named in the side was Frank Pickrang who was to join him at Manukau the following season. Before the match he played for Hangatiki in a 12–3 win over Otorohanga and was prominent in some attacking "dribbling rushes". The match against Waipā was for the Peace Cup and was an elimination match at Albert Park, Te Awamutu. Maniapoto won 6 points to 3 with Gault scoring one of their tries. In the first half he "created excitement when he dribbled down the side line, but he was grassed, and half time came with no score". At full time the scores were level 3–3 with ten minutes extra time each was decided upon. Gault scored after "a passing rush almost the full length of the field". The Waipa Post said that "Craig was the best of the visitors, with Gault and Pickrang particularly good in the tight work." After a match for Hangatiki against Te Kuiti he was selected for Maniapoto's match with Kawhia on July 27. He was chosen in the front row along with T. Brown, and T, Peterson. Against Kawhia, Maniapoto won 25-6 at home on Rugby Park in Te Kūiti on July 27, with Gault scoring one of their tries. Then for Maniapoto against Waitanguru on August 3 he played the "game of the day… especially in the first half, he played a tremendously powerful forward game, breaking through the tight, dribbling and handling at the head of every attacking movement". Gault was selected for the Maniapoto side to play their next Peace Cup game against Matamata but he ultimately did not play as he was away from the area at the time of the 17 August game.

Gault finished the season with three matches for Hangatiki. The first was against Waitete on 24 August, before a 16-11 semi-final win over Pio Pio in the Pukeweka Shield. Gault did "splendid work" for Hangatiki and was mentioned several times, and set up their last try after he "ploughed his way through the whole Pio Pio team… before Ted Davis got the ball across". Hangatiki won the final when they defeated Waitanguru 17 to 3. Gault scored with his try coming "from a forward rush", he failed to convert his own try. With the match Gault's career with the side came to an end.

=== Rugby league (Manukau) ===
==== 1936 ====
At the start of the 1936 season Gault moved to Auckland to join the Manukau rugby league club. The side had re-entered the first grade competition for the first time in many years and recruited several good rugby union players from around the North Island including Gault, Frank Pickrang, and Jackie Rata from the King Country and several other players from other regions such as Jack Hemi from the Wairarapa. He was officially registered with Manukau at the 13 May meeting of the Auckland Rugby League though had already played in two matches prior to this as was common in the era with players switching codes being allowed to play for their new clubs as they were not registered with any other rugby league club. His first match came against Devonport United (North Shore Albions) on 2 May on Carlaw Park #2 field with Devonport winning 27–2 against the new Manukau combination. The match was played in a cold wind with heavy rain and occasional hail showers with the New Zealand Herald saying that Gault, along with Jack Whye and Len Kawe "were the best of the forwards" for Manukau.

In round 2 on 9 May tragedy struck the Manukau club with one of their founders, Albert Cowan suffering a fatal heart attack in their dressing room after congratulating the team in the dressing room following their 14–8 over Richmond Rovers. Cowan was buried on 12 May with Gault being one of the pall bearers at his Onehunga funeral, which was the suburb that Manukau were based in at this time. A week later Manukau lost to Ponsonby United 24–18 with Gault and Puti Tipene (Steve) Watene "the best of the forwards". After a 16–11 win over City Rovers Manukau were defeated by Mount Albert United 23–18 on 30 May. The Auckland Star said Frank Pickrang (Gault's Maniapoto teammate) was the best of the Manukau forwards with Gault, Kawe, and Whye "usually in the hunt". The Herald said that Gault, Watene, and Kawe were "prominent".

On 6 June Manukau beat Marist Old Boys 39–18 in a fast game on Carlaw Park #2. He sparked an early try after he "snapped up in the loose" near halfway and fed Pickrang, then after a passing movement Watene scored. The Herald said that Gault was "outstanding" and in addition to the try he was involved with he scored two of his own. Gault was then selected in one of the Auckland representative teams. The Herald wrote that "it is pleasing to note that A. Gault, Manukau, has been given an opportunity in one of the [representative] matches. He is the most-improved forward in Auckland, being fast and a good handler, and work in rucks is of a high standard". The next week in a 15–14 win over Newton Rangers he was "resourceful" in "foiling" the Newton forwards which included Lou Hutt. It was revealed in an advertisement that Albert (Opai) Asher was training the Manukau side for the season. Asher was a former All Black and New Zealand rugby league representative. On 20 June Manukau drew with one of the other leading teams, Devonport 5 points to 5. The Auckland Star wrote that "Gault was in the limelight continually for fine dribbling and tireless energy in chasing the ball".

The representative match that Gault had been selected for was the Auckland team to play Wellington on 23 June which was King's Birthday. He was selected in the second row along with Keane from Marist. On the same day another Auckland side was playing a Māori representative team. The Auckland side that Gault played in beat Wellington 25 to 22 with Gault amongst the best of Auckland's forwards along with Dan Keane, J Peterson, Bill Telford, and Jack Satherley. Gault was also involved in a try when he joined a passing movement and sent Ross Jones over.

On 27 June Manukau lost to Richmond 27–11 with Gault concussed and needing to be taken to Auckland Hospital. The Herald reported that "Angus Tait Gault, aged 23, of 312 Queen Street, Onehunga, groundsman" was "conveyed in a St. John ambulance" to hospital but his condition was not reported as serious. The Queen Street in Onehunga mentioned was later renamed to Onehunga Mall. Prior to leaving the field Gault was playing well and he, Pickrang, Whye, Kawe, and Watene "consistently caught the eye". Following the game he was selected to go into training for the Auckland side to play the touring England side. At the time his weight was stated as "12st 8lb". He then starred for Manukau in a 14–12 win over the leading Ponsonby side in the 10th round of the Fox Memorial championship. The Auckland Star wrote that "the outstanding forward on the field was Gault, who was always following up and lending his weight in the tight stuff".

Gault was chosen for a New Zealand trial match at Carlaw Park which would be a curtain raiser to the North Island v South Island inter-island match on 11 July. He was selected at prop with Flanagan at hooker and Bill Telford in the other propping position. They would play opposite the front row of the 'B Team' consisting of Clark, John Rutherford, and Bill Breed. Gault's A Team lost 16–13 with Gault scoring one of their 3 tries and playing a "good game". The Herald said he was "prominent" and his try came after he supported a break down the sideline by Owen Wilkie. On 18 July in a match against City Rovers which Manukau won 10-6 Gault "played a splendid game for Manukau and was conspicuous for fast following up and hard work in the loose and tight".

Gault was then selected for the Auckland to play England on 25 July at Carlaw Park. He was picked at prop along with Bill Breed, with Jack Satherley at hooker. The Auckland Star said that all the players were deserving of their place and that Gault had been "playing splendid football". In a different article the Star wrote that "Gault… has been playing wonderfully in club games, … [and] will be making his first appearance in really big football and his form will be watched with interest" along with Bill Breed and Frank Pickrang's. The Herald also noted that he had been "playing well throughout the season". Gault would be up against Nat Silcock and Harry Woods in the England front row prop positions. England won the match 22–16 in fairly heavy conditions after rain in front of a 14,000 strong crowd at Carlaw Park. The Herald reported that Breed and Gault were "conspicuous throughout" in the Auckland forward pack. The following week after Manukau beat Mount Albert 11-9 Gault was selected as a forward reserve along with Harold Tetley for the New Zealand team to play England. No replacements were permitted in the test match according to the rules of the time so his training was precautionary in case any forwards were injured in the build up to the test match and ultimately he was not required to play.

Gault scored a try for Manukau on 22 August in round 14 of the championship when they beat Marist 24–7. He was playing in an uncustomary position in the backs. The Auckland Star wrote that he "got through a wealth of good work on the wing". The reason he was playing in the backs was because Manukau had a wealth of riches in the forward positions with Puti Tipene Watene, Peter Mahima, Jack Whye, John Rutherford, Len Kawe, Frank Pickrang, and Jack Brodrick who were all New Zealand or Auckland representatives. Gault then scored two more tries in Manukau's Fox Memorial title winning victory over Newton 26–6. The match was played on the #2 field at Carlaw Park with Mount Albert's loss to Marist at the same time on the #1 field handing Manukau the championship for 1936. Gault was once again playing on the wing and "ran with splendid determination. The fact that Gault was in the backs was merely illustrative of the fact that they could not find a place for him in the forwards, where there was a great quartet in Pickrang, Brodrick, Kawe and Watene…". The Herald wrote that "Gault, on the wing, and Pickrang, at five eighths, played outstanding football. The former scored two good tries", and that "Gault was prominent on the wing, putting in several dashing runs". During the week the Herald said that "in Pickrang and Gault, Manukau has two of the best forwards seen in Auckland for some years, and players likely to gain high honours next season". In round 1 of the Roope Rooster knockout competition Gault scored another try whilst playing on the wing. They beat Ponsonby 10–8 with Jack Hemi at five eighth playing "a rattling good game…and once he made a gem of an opening to send Gault over at the corner". The Herald went on to say "Gault, the big forward, was again called in for service on the wing, and had more that his share of defensive work to do as Ponsonby sensing him as a weakness, swung the play in his direction whenever possible. Though by no means a polished back, Gault, however, performed reasonably well, and let little past him". They also said he did well with limited opportunities with Walter Brimble debuting in rugby league at five eighth in the Manukau side. They then beat Papakura at Prince Edward Park in Papakura in round 2 on 12 September. Gault scored another try and he and Brodrick "were on the attack all the time". The final was played on 26 September at Carlaw Park and saw Manukau win 23 to 10 against City Rovers. Gault had returned to the pack, with the Auckland Star stating "two fine forwards for Manukau were Brodrick and Gault". The Herald said "Kawe and Gault, one of the most promising forwards in the code, also did good work". In a later article the Herald wrote that "Gault is a much improved forward and proved a hard player to bring down. He has only to look for supports when in possession to become a high-class forward". On 3 October Manukau played in the Stormont Shield final which was usually played between the winner of the championship and the winner of the Roope Rooster, however with Manukau winning both trophies Manukau played the runner up for the championship which was Richmond. Richmond won the game comfortably 30 points to 9. In the first half "Gault snapped up the ball and Brimble was over in a flash" to give them their only try.

In late December Gault was mentioned as a cricket player in the Possibles side in an Onehunga Cricket Association match to be played at Waikaraka Park, Onehunga. on 26 December. Gault was playing for the Reid Rubber (green) side and in early December he top scored 35 runs in a loss to Reid Rubber (gold) at Waikaraka Park with his side managing just 75 in total. His name was printed as "G Gault" indicating his first name of Angus had been shortened to "Gus".

==== 1937 ====
The 1937 season saw Gault make his debut in the New Zealand side. He played 19 club matches for Manukau along with 3 games for Auckland, and a New Zealand trial match. At Manukau's annual meeting in late March before 250 members and supporters the success of the club was celebrated along with the individual achievements of several players including Gault's selection as a reserve for the New Zealand side.

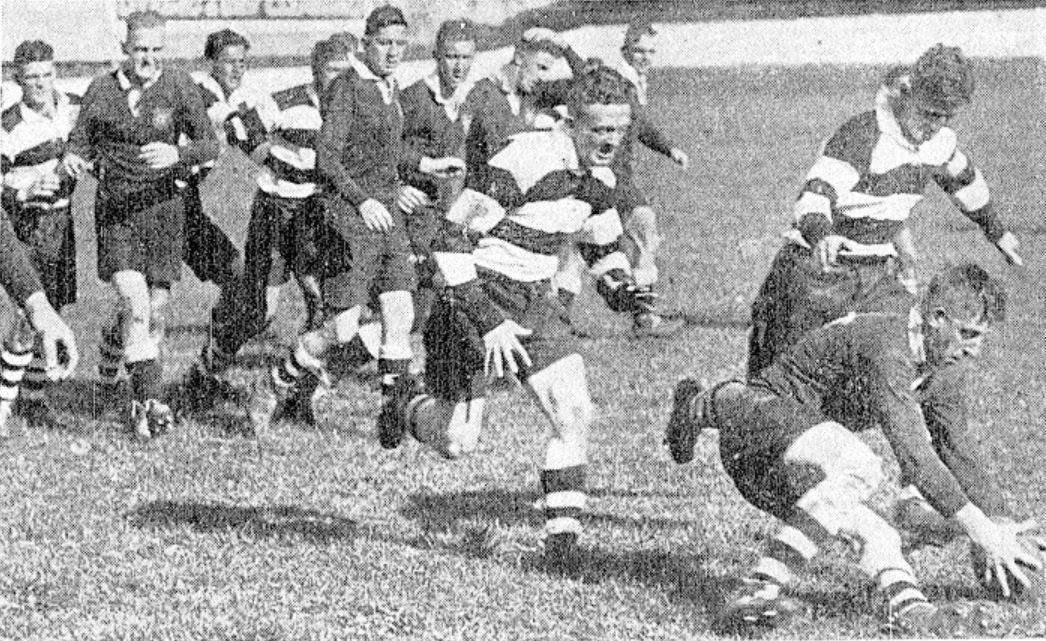
Gault on the extreme left in the black and white jersey of Manukau in their 19–12 win over North Shore on 1 May

In Manukau's first match of the season, a preliminary round match against Richmond on 17 April at Carlaw Park Gault scored a try in a 15–11 loss where he was "in the fore" with Brodrick, Kawe, and Phillips. The Herald wrote during the week that "the Manukau vanguard this season looks a formidable set, and with the experience gained last year Brodrick, Kawe and Gault should develop into outstanding league forwards". Manukau's first Fox Memorial championship match was on 1 May against North Shore. They won 19–12 with Gault "prominent throughout" with some other forwards. "He did blow a try however after he crossed but allowed himself to be pushed over the dead ball line". Following the game he was selected in the Auckland Pākehā side to play Auckland Māori in a midweek match on May 12. He was initially named in the second row with Bill Breed but was moved to prop in a reshuffling of the forwards with Jack Satherley at hooker. There were nine Manukau players in the Māori squad of 17 with Gault propping against teammate Len Kawe, and Minnix. Prior to the match he was "the best forward" in the Manukau side in a 17–10 win over Marist. Gault's Auckland Pākehā side defeated the Māori team by 24 points to 14.

Gault then returned to the Manukau side for a stretch of 4 games. The first was a 7–3 loss to Ponsonby on 15 May where he was the pick of the forwards with Kawe and Rickett. He was one of their best forwards again in a 20–4 loss to Mt Albert the following week. Then in a 13–13 draw with City he worked well with Rickett and Painter and they were "always in the limelight". He was involved in a try in the first half after he combined with the other forwards in a passing movement and the Herald said that he, Watene and Painter "were the best of the forwards". In an 18–11 win over Newton on 5 June Gault was again "prominent".

Gault's continued good form saw him selected at prop in the Auckland team to play Taranaki on 9 June at Carlaw Park. Such was Auckland's strength that they had chosen two sides to play, with another Auckland side playing South Auckland (Waikato) in a 1:30 kickoff with Gault's Auckland side playing at 3:00. Auckland beat Taranaki 27–10 with Gault going over to score only to be called back for a forward pass.

Returning to Manukau he "shone" in a 22–18 loss to Richmond in round 7 of the championship. Jack Brodrick was the best forward and was well supported by Gault and Rickett. Manukau then travelled to Taneatua on 19 June to play a Bay of Plenty side in a "travel round" where six Auckland clubs played matches around the North Island against local opponents. Manukau won 51–33 in a fast and open game. Gault played "splendidly" along with Watene and Brodrick for the visitors.

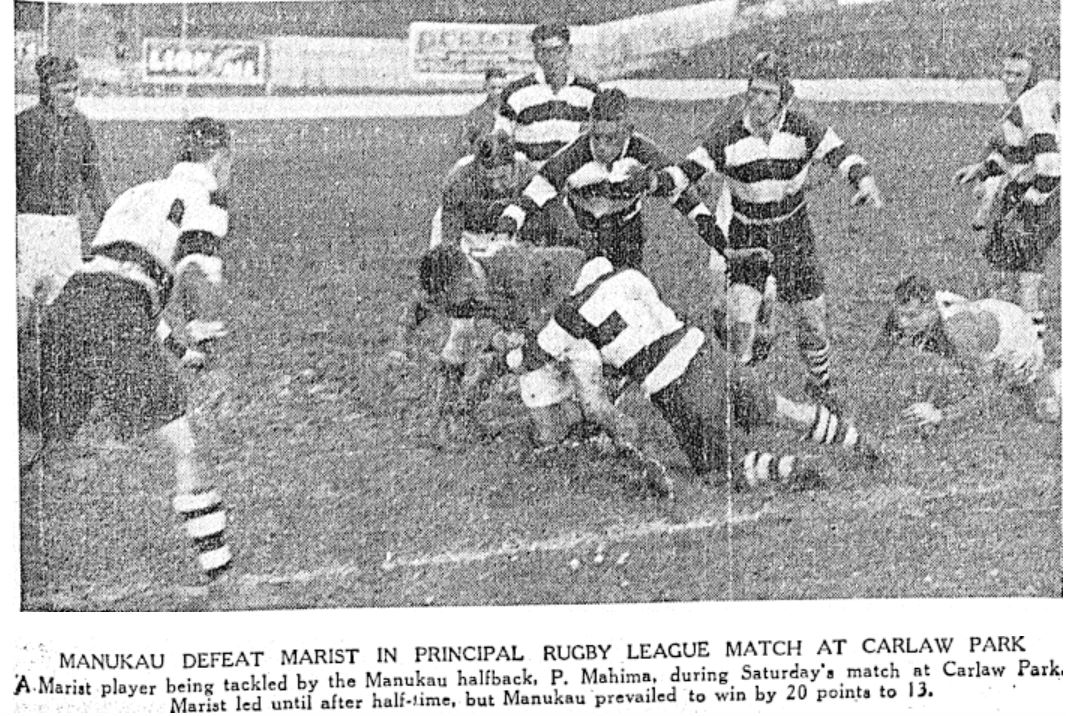
Peter Mahima tackling a Marist player with Gault in the headgear close to the play on 10 July

They returned to Auckland and continued the championship with a 31–11 win over North Shore with new recruits Rangi Chase and Tommy Chase scoring 2 tries each. Gault was one of their forwards who was "usually to the fore". They then beat Marist 20–13 with "the Manukau pack working strenuously throughout, and men who emerged with honours were painter, Kawe, Brodrick and Gault". Gault played another "good game" in a 22–5 win against Newton on 17 July. Then after another win, where Gault scored a try, against Ponsonby which saw Manukau move to second in the championship Gault was said to be "probably the best of the Manukau forwards" by the Auckland Star.

===== New Zealand selection and debut =====
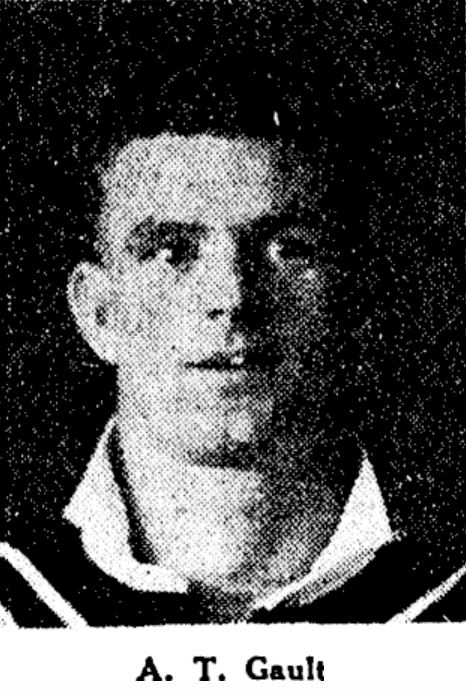

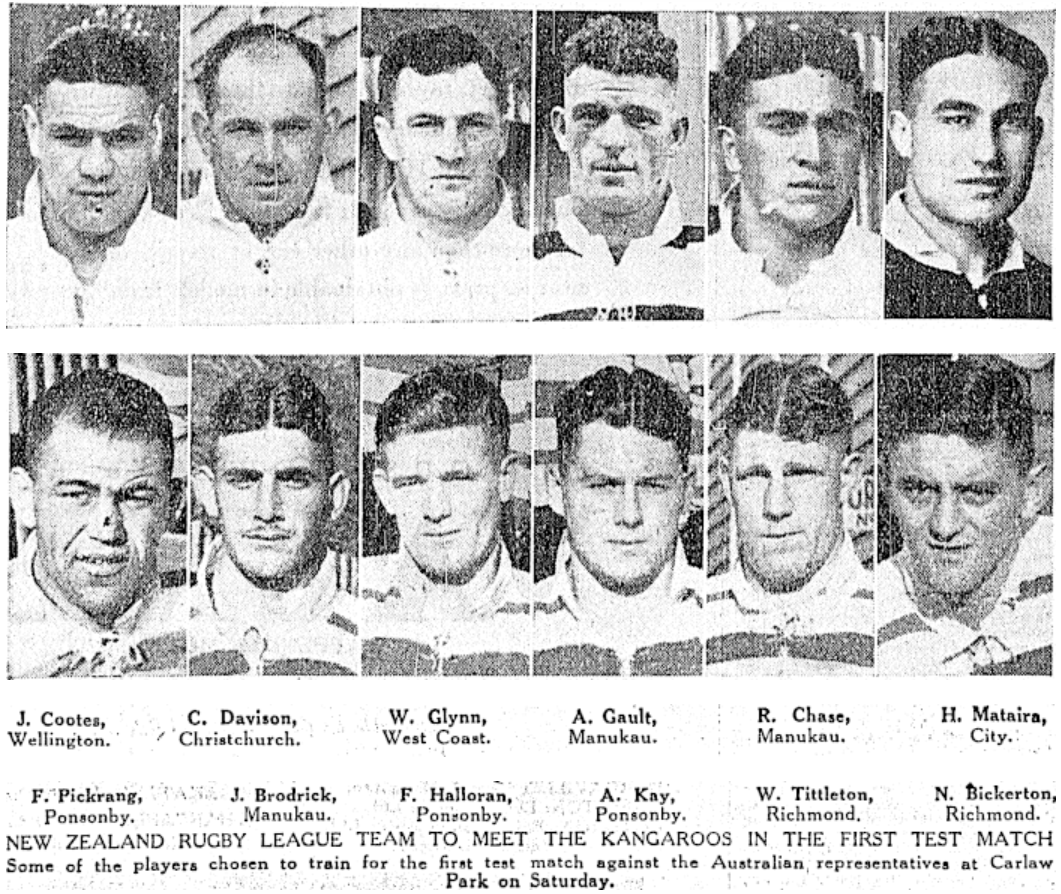
New Zealand profile pictures including Angus Gault for first test v Australia

In late July, Gault was selected for a New Zealand trial in the Possibles side. He was named at prop with Bill Telford, and Bert Leatherbarrow at hooker with Joe Cootes and Bill Breed propping against them. The match was being played to help the New Zealand selectors choose the side for the upcoming visit of Auckland by Australia. The Possibles won 25–11 in "heavy conditions" though there were several injuries and positional changes. Gault reportedly "showed up well," along with several other forwards. The Herald wrote that "Gault made a good impression and has strong claims for a position in the front row". With the trial played midweek Gault returned to his Manukau side and scored a try in an 11–11 draw with Richmond. Jack Hemi had been injured in the trial and they were without a regular goal kicker and missed "several easy kicks". Jack Brodrick was in outstanding form with Gault and Kawe giving him "excellent support". The Herald mentioned him several times in their match report after he nearly scored early, then did cross for a try, and they later commented that he and Brodrick were "outstanding".

Gault was then chosen in New Zealand's 15 man squad to play Australia by selectors Thomas (Scotty) McClymont, Bert Avery, and Jim Amos. The Herald wrote that "the front row will include Cootes, Glynn, and Gault, and the trio should provide strong opposition for the Australians". The Auckland Star opined: "the [New Zealand] forwards have brains and brawn, and players of the type of Glynn, the West Coaster, Gault and Brodrick should be able to keep their opponents moving throughout".

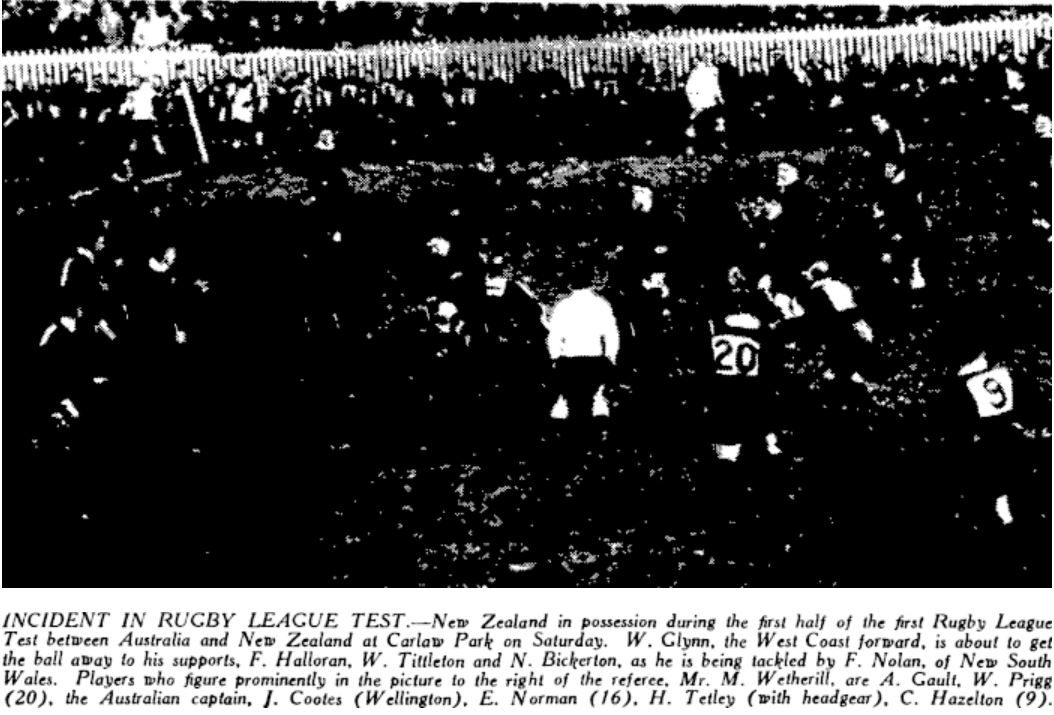
Gault slightly to the right of (referee) Maurice Wetherill in white, in the upper half of the picture

The test was played at Carlaw Park on 7 August and saw Australia win a close match 12–8 before a crowd of 20,000 after the scores were locked at 6–6 at half time. Gault propped against Jim Gibbs and Ray Stehr. The Auckland Star said that "the New Zealand forwards were triers all the way and most marks for constant endeavour would probably go to Gault, Glynn, and Tetley…" The Herald praised Gault's performance, saying "every time Percy Williams set up a passing movement, either Jack McLeod or Gault broke fast from the scrum and checked Ernie Norman, who was often caught in possession". And that "Gault played a splendid game, and his low tackling was an object lesson to others".

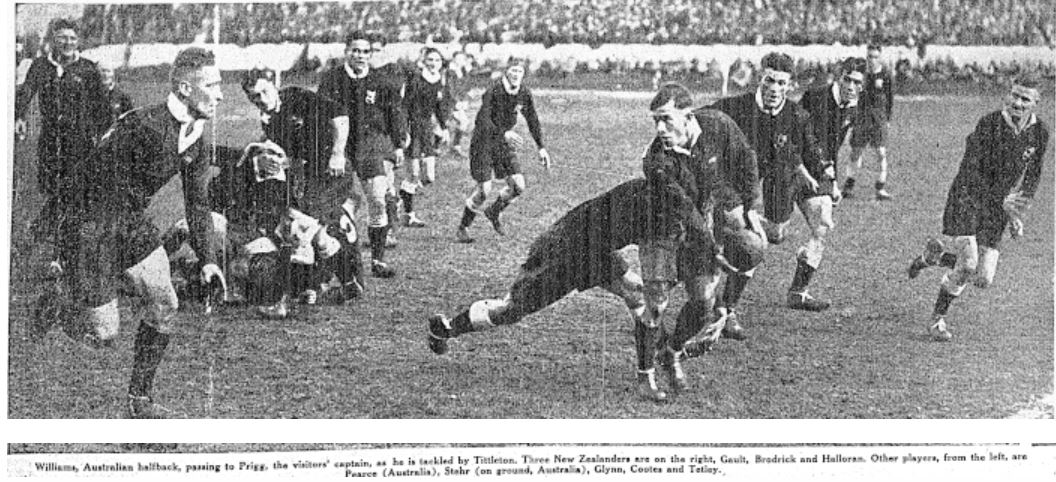

He was unsurprisingly named in the second test squad to train during the week while the Australian side was due to play New Zealand Māori midweek. New Zealand won the second test 16–15, once again at Carlaw Park, on 14 August. Australia was severely handicapped during the match with several injuries and with no replacements allowed in the second half they spent long periods playing with 12 and 11 players, and at one point only had 10 on the field. Brodrick was "the pick of the New Zealand van, but he had good support all the way from Glynn, Gault, and Cootes". The Herald wrote in a later review of the match that "Brodrick, Glynn, and Gault were a trio of determined, hard-working forwards".

===== Manukau and Auckland (1937 conclusion) =====
Gault returned to the Manukau side for the concluding stages of the championship. They lost to Mt Albert 20–19 on 21 August which ended their hopes of the title. Gault scored one of their 3 tries and played a good game being "most prominent" among their forwards along with Painter. They then lost their final round match to City 23–20 on 28 August to finish 4th of 8 teams in the 1937 championship. The Auckland Star said that Gault "played well all the way". Manukau finished the season with a loss to Mt Albert in round 1 of the Roope Rooster competition 35 to 18, before Gault missed their 17–15 win over Newton in round 1 of the Phelan Shield knockout competition. The Star said that "the [Manukau] forwards without Gault, were only a shadow of the club's thirteen fielded earlier in the season". Gault returned for their semi final loss to North Shore 16–10 on 18 September. He was then selected for the final representative match of the season which was for Auckland against New Zealand Māori on 9 October. The Māori side won the match at Carlaw Park easily by 43 points to 21 and had a side which featured several of Gault's Manukau teammates.

==== 1938 ====
===== Manukau, Auckland, North Island, and New Zealand =====
The 1938 season saw Gault play 17 matches for Manukau and also play once more for Auckland, while he made his one and only appearance for the North Island side in their annual inter-island match. He was also chosen to go on the New Zealand tour of Australia.

His first match was for Manukau against Ponsonby in a championship preliminary round game on 2 April which Manukau won 19–11. They were upset 19–8 by Newton in round 1 of the Fox Memorial championship. Gault "showed out among the forwards" for the losers. The following week Manukau beat North Shore 26–21 with "good passing between Brodrick, Gault and Pita Ririnui was a feature of the game". Then against Marist on 23 April in an 18–4 win in the main match at Carlaw Park Gault stood out. The Herald wrote "an outstanding forward game was played by Gault, who was in everything. He is an improved player in all departments". They had a bye before another win against Mt Albert on 7 May by 17 points to 9. Gault was "very prominent in the forwards and was well supported by Brodrick and Ririnui". Their good form continued with an 18–16 win against Richmond on 14 May with the same three Manukau players being "a fine trio" in the victory.

===== Auckland and North Island selection =====
Gault was selected in the Auckland team to play against a "Rest of the North Island" side as a trial match to help select the New Zealand touring side. He was named at prop along with Des Herring, with Jack Satherley at hooker. Auckland thrashed their opponent 67–14 at Carlaw Park on 18 May with Gault scoring 1 of their 14 tries. He was then selected for the North Island team to play South Island on 21 May. The Herald said that in the Auckland match "Gault, in the front row, … played a splendid game and excelled with good handling".

For the North Island, Gault was selected in the second row with Manukau teammate Jack Brodrick. Des Herring and Joe Cootes who had played well in the losing 'Rest of North Island' side were selected at prop. The inter-island match was played at Carlaw Park on 21 May and saw the North Island team run out huge victors by 55 points to 2 with Gault scoring 1 of their 12 tries. He narrowly missed scoring earlier, brought down a foot from the try line by a tackle. He was later involved in a "good passing bout" with Tetley and Herring, and soon after missed another try when Clarry McNeil broke away but threw a forward pass to Gault to blow the try. Then early in the second half Joe Cootes "sent Gault over for a try" before he later took a pass from McNeil which he passed to Herring who scored.

===== New Zealand Tour of Australia =====
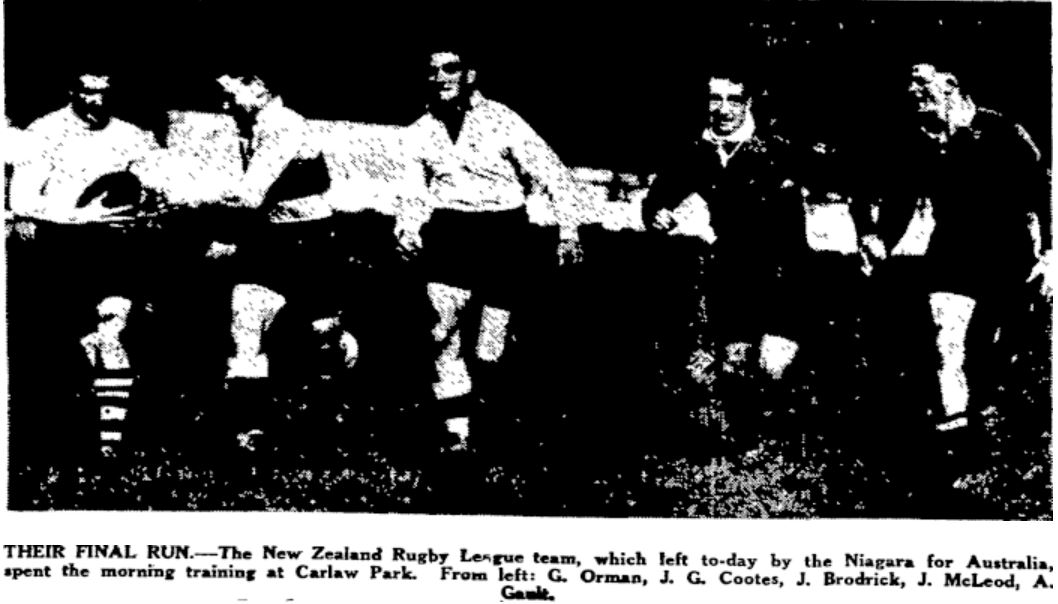
Gault on the right, training at Carlaw Park before the team departed for Australia

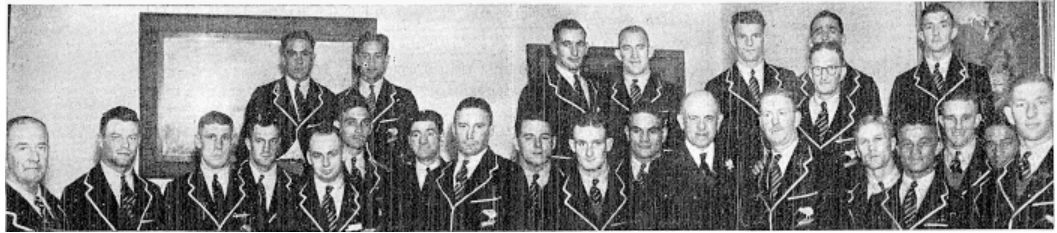
Gault, 10th from the right

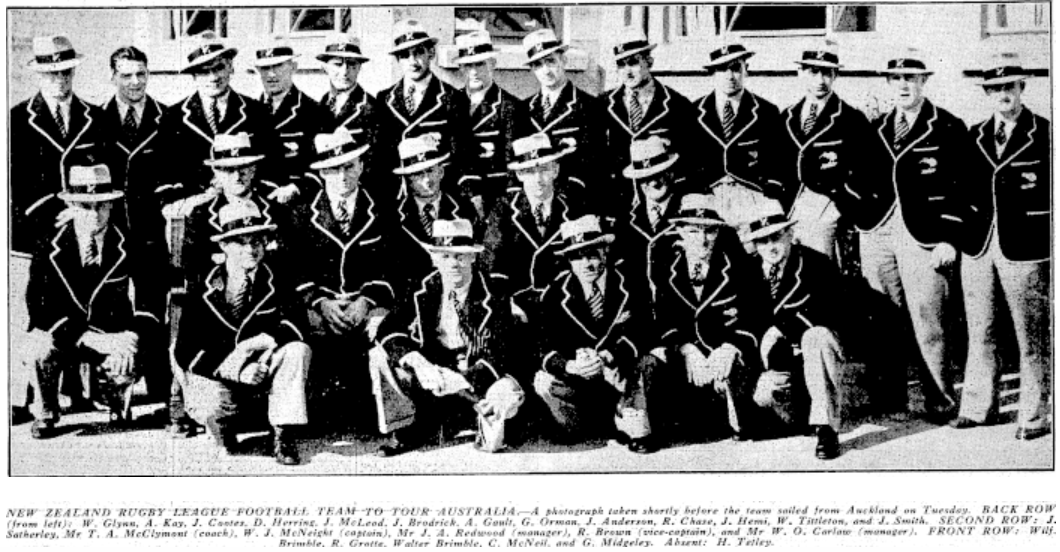
The New Zealand team prior to departure

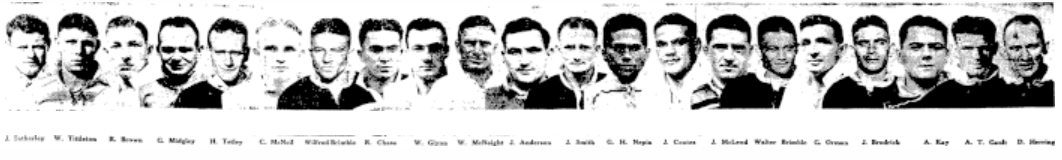
Gault, 2nd from the right

Following the resounding win over the South Island, Gault was selected in the New Zealand team to tour Australia. He was among the 22 players chosen which included 11 forwards. The side was unsurprisingly dominated by Auckland players with 18 in the squad. The Auckland Star wrote "Jack McLeod, Gault, Brodrick, and John Anderson represent the best type of mid row players in the game". The Herald said "Gault is a good all-round forward, particularly in the second row, where his speed is useful".

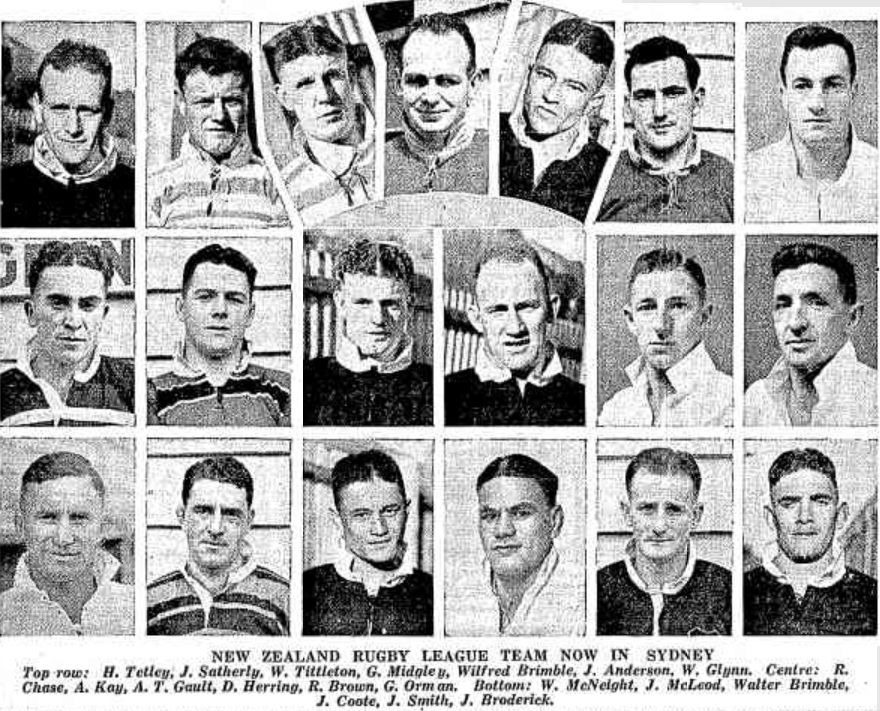

The Herald also published a piece with brief biographical information about each player; of Gault they wrote, "A. Gault (Auckland) is 24 years of age and weighs 13st. 2lb. He played representative football in the King Country and is a greatly improved forward. He has speed and is a good handler".

Before they departed for the tour Gault played one more match for Manukau against City in round 7 of the championship. They won 23 to 19 with Gault scoring yet again. He and Pita Ririnui were the "leaders" in their forwards. The same newspaper later said he "was the pick of the forwards".

On 30 May a ball was held for them at the Peter Pan Cabaret in the evening. Then on 31 May a civic farewell was held for the side with Auckland mayor Sir Ernest Davis leading proceedings at the Auckland Town Hall, preceded by morning tea at George Court's. The side departed on the Canadian-Australasian liner Niagara from Auckland, travelling to Sydney on 1 June.

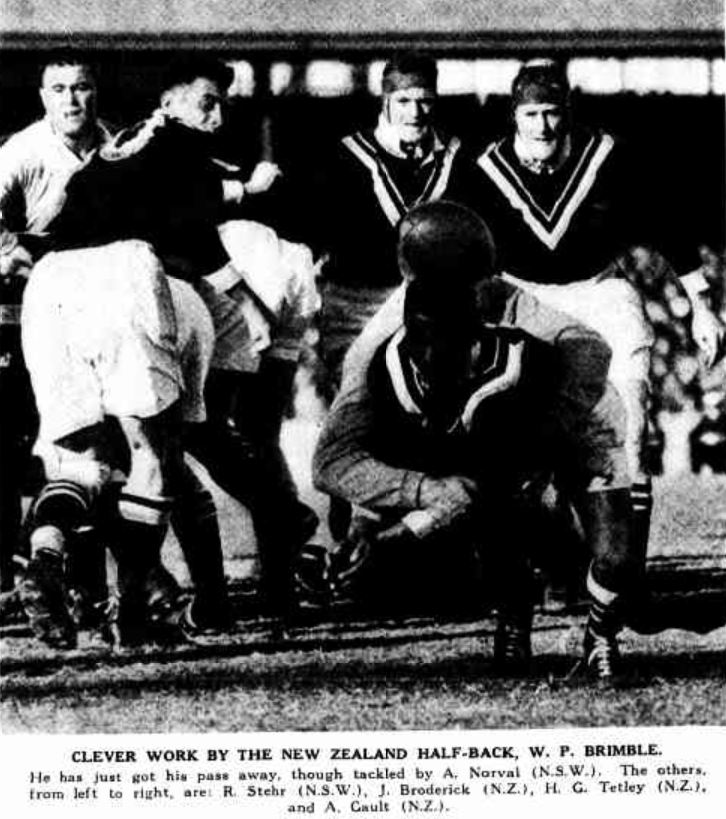
Angus Gault in the middle background with Tetley to the right. The photo caption had the two players incorrectly labelled.

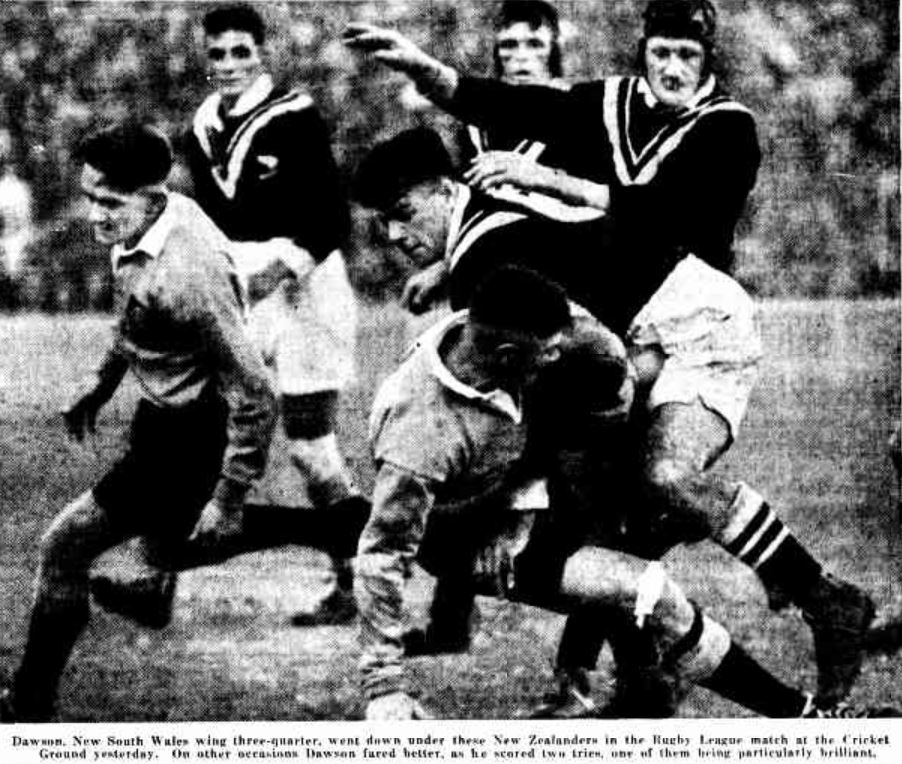
Gault in the background (head showing), behind Harold Tetley's outstretched arm in the match against NSW at the SCG

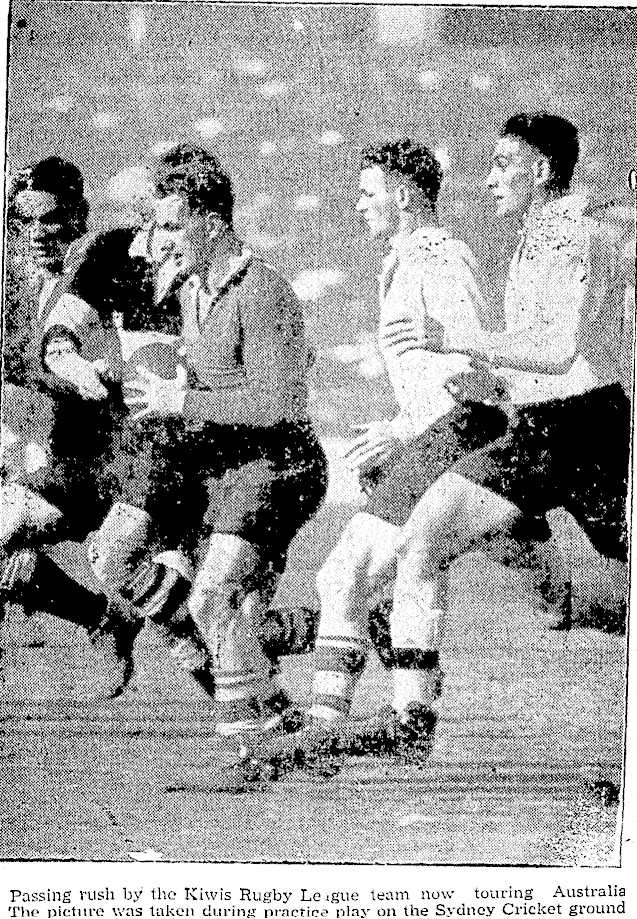
Gault second from the right at training at the SCG.

Gault was selected to play in the second row with Brodrick in the first tour match against New South Wales on 11 June at the Sydney Cricket Ground. Before a crowd of 28,303 New South Wales beat New Zealand 25–12 after leading 8–3 at halftime. During the second half Arthur Kay was injured meaning New Zealand played with 12 and fell away. The New Zealand forwards were said to have "played splendidly", particularly Brodrick, with Gault and Herring "also conspicuous". The Truth newspaper in Sydney said "Gault, McNeight, Satherley, and Herring were like tigers in close, while Tetley was everywhere". The Sydney Morning Herald said the same players played "with considerable dash". The Referee publication wrote "Brodrick second row, Gault not so tall, but solid and sound, Herring front row, and Tetley, lock, were most dangerous among a good, lively set of New Zealand scrummagers".

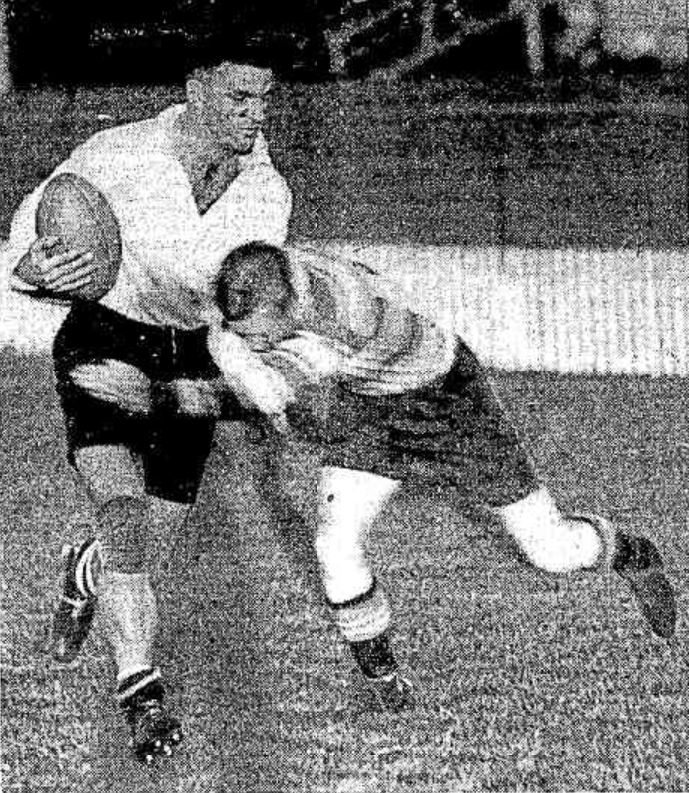
Gault carrying the ball at training in Sydney with Robert Grotte attempting to tackle him

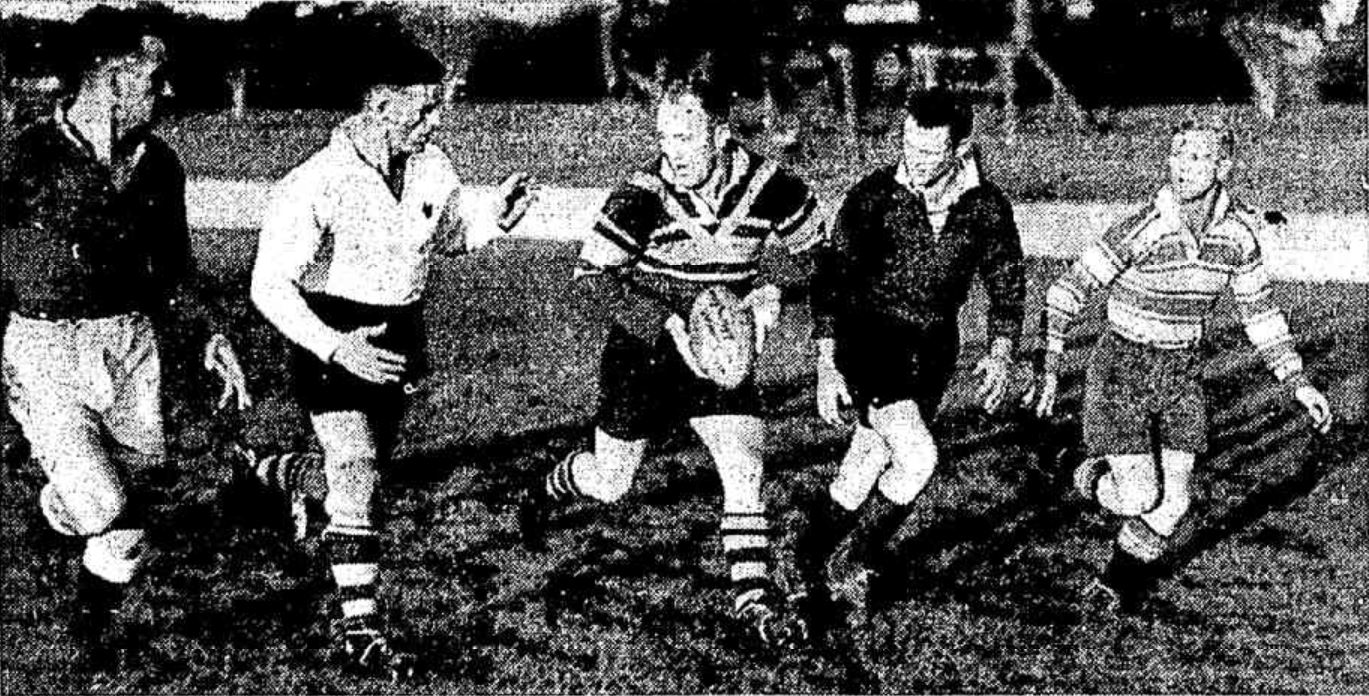
Gault about to receive the ball from Des Herring at training in Sydney

Gault was dropped for the second match against the same opponent with the selectors preferring the "slightly heavier" Jack McLeod in the second row. New Zealand won convincingly by 37 points to 18.

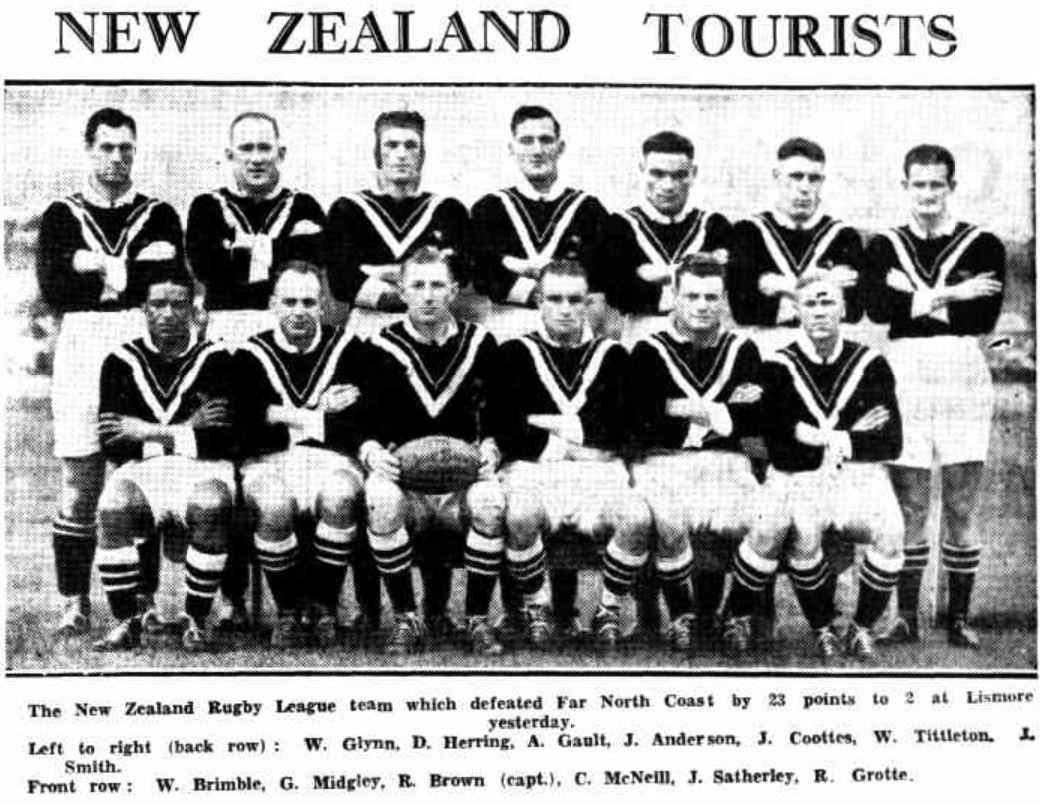

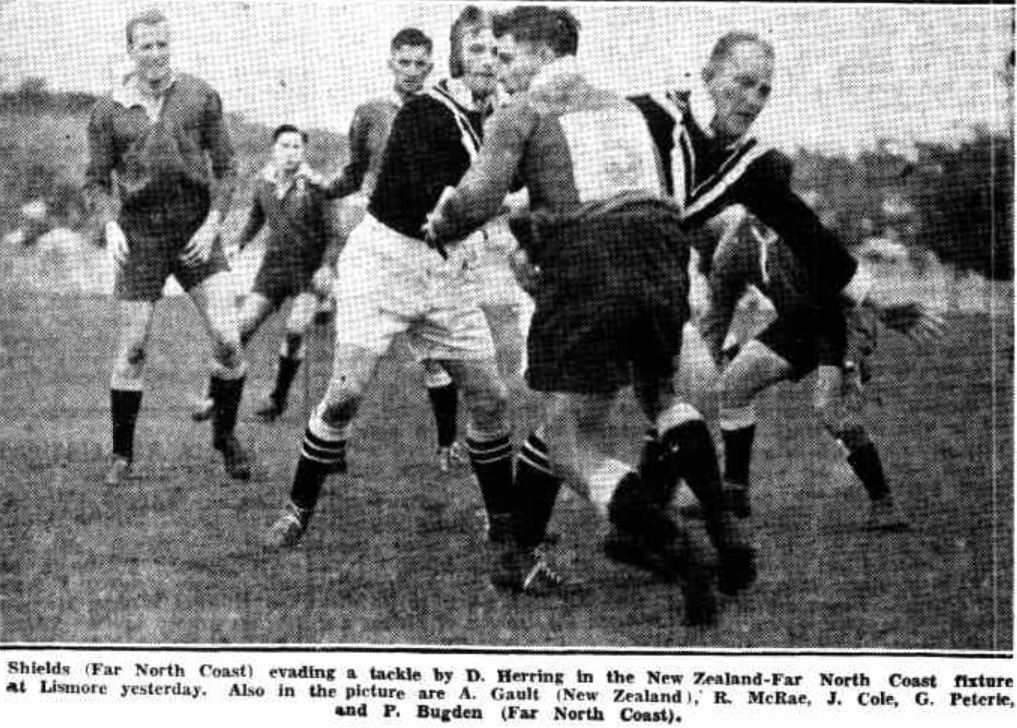
Des Herring tackling W. Shields of North Coast, with Gault in close proximity

He was selected again for the 3rd match of the tour against North Coast at Lismore on 15 June, with New Zealand winning 23–2. Gault was named in an extended 17 player squad with 8 forwards for the next match on the tour against Queensland on 18 June at the Brisbane Cricket Ground (Gabba). On 21 June it was reported that Gault had been injured during scrummaging practice and was taken to hospital where it was found he had a "badly-bruised hip bone". And he would stay in "hospital for observation, and it is extremely unlikely that he will be able to play against Toowoomba on Wednesday". The Brisbane Telegraph published a photograph of Gault being carried from the training field. Unsurprisingly Gault was omitted from the New Zealand team to play Queensland and then Toowoomba. It was further reported that "Gault had been in pain ever since admission to hospital on Monday. An x-ray was taken, but the result will not be known before to-morrow morning. 'the doctors do not think there is anything serious, probably only a bruise', said Mr. Redwood." Gault had been named in the side to play Toowoomba and "was removed by ambulance bearers to the hospital". It was said that "Gault was not indulging in any strenuous movements when he sustained the injury… he emerged from a ruck, and standing upright he felt a terrific pain in his side. Staggering a few yards, he collapsed on the ground and lay there unable to move". After a few days in hospital Gault was able to leave with it revealed that he had torn his hip muscle and was ruled out of the remainder of the tour. Gault arrived back in New Zealand with the rest of the team on 16 July after returning on board the Aorangi. He was named in the reserves for the New Zealand side to play Auckland on 16 July at Carlaw Park as he was likely not fully recovered.

Gault was next named to play in a match for Manukau against City a week later, on 23 July. In a round 16 match against Mt Albert which Manukau won 31–5 on 6 August Gault played a splendid game along with Ririnui, Brodrick, and Whye with Gault scoring one of their tries. He then played in Auckland's final representative match of the season when they came up against Canterbury on 13 August at Carlaw Park. He was selected in the front row with Jack McLeod in the other prop position and Jack Satherley at hooker. Auckland won the game 28–22 against a relatively strong Canterbury side.

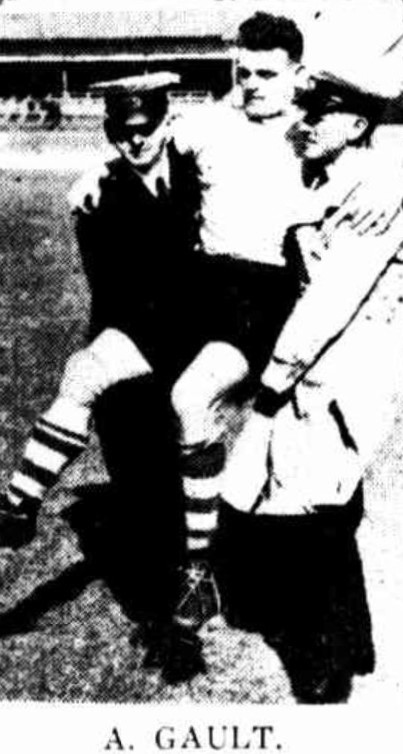
Gault being carried from the training ground with a torn hip muscle

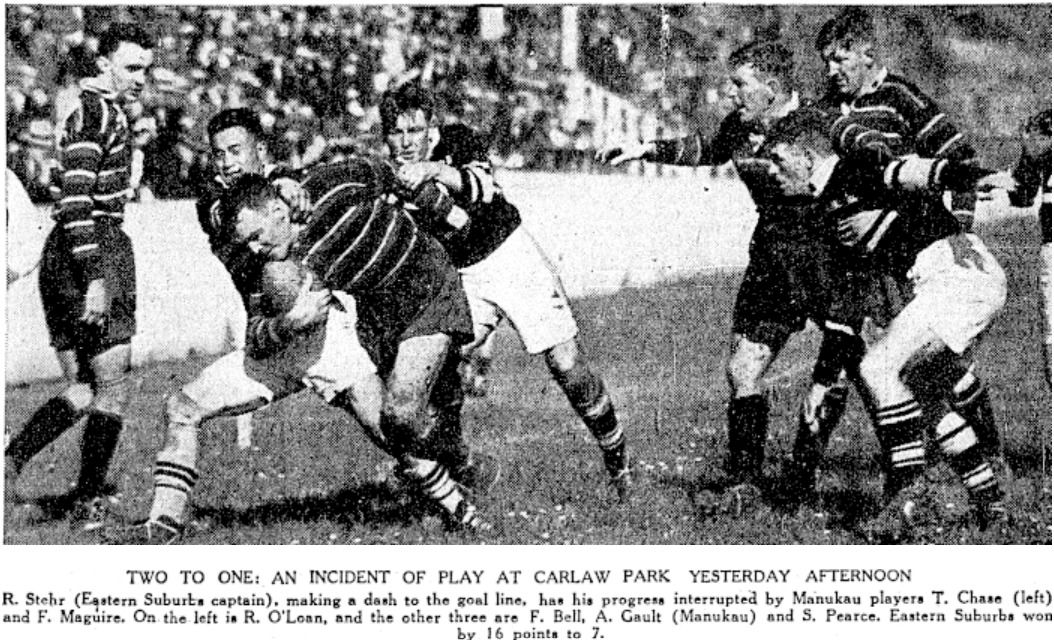

===== Return to Manukau =====
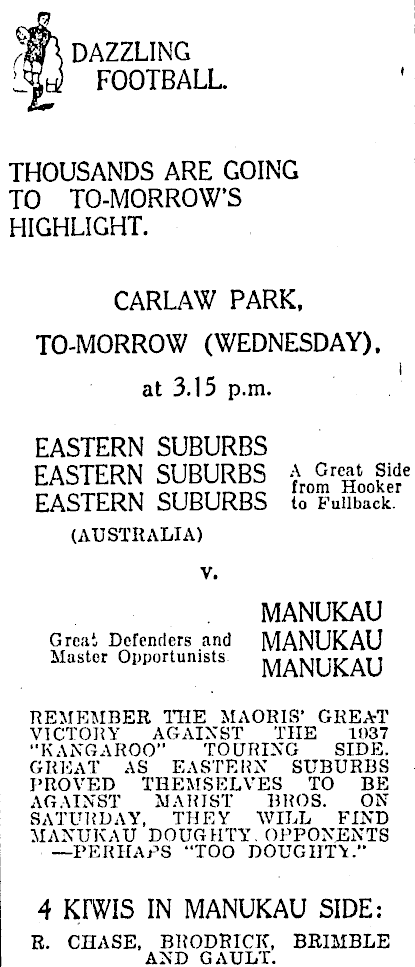
Manukau v Eastern Suburbs in 1938 advertisement

Gault then finished the season with several matches for Manukau. Their final championship match was against Ponsonby and saw them win 26 to 14 with Gault scoring two of their tries, both of which were set up by Rangi Chase. The result meant they leap frogged Manukau on the table and finished in 4th place out of 9. Gault was once again playing on the wing as he has done a handful of times previously in his career. The Herald said that for his first try he "showed a lot of pace on the wing to score a nice try" while his second came after "Chase went through the whole team" before Gault received it to score. They went on to mention that "Gault, the New Zealand forward, was a success on the wing and always hard to stop". The positional move had come after "Manukau were a bit short of playing material and to complete their backs they had to play Gault at wing three-quarter, a position in which the New Zealand forward did quite well". In a round 2 match for the Phelan Shield, Gault "did a lot of good work among the Manukau forwards". Gault, Ririnui, and Maguire, were "the pick of the forwards" for Manukau in their 26-8 Phelan Shield semi final win over Ponsonby on 24 September. Their penultimate game for the season was against the touring Eastern Suburbs side which had finished runner up in the NSW RFL competition. They beat Manukau 16–7 at Carlaw Park on 28 September with Gault and Ririnui said to have played "good games in the forwards" for Manukau. His final game of the season was against Papakura on 1 October in the Phelan Shield final. The match was played as curtain-raiser to the Eastern Suburbs v Richmond game with 11,000 in attendance. Manukau won 18–8 with Gault once again named as one of the pick of the forwards along with Ririnui and Harry Zane-Zaninovich.

==== 1939, final season ====
The 1939 season was to be Gault's last despite being just 27 years of age. He played in 10 of Manukau's games, scoring 2 tries and made one representative appearance for the Auckland Pākehā side which played Auckland Māori before retiring from the game.

He was named in the first Manukau squad of the year to play Ponsonby on 1 April. The season was starting early with a view to have much of the football played before the New Zealand touring team for England was selected. Manukau lost the game 29–22. Gault was named during the week to play a Sydney XIII side which was touring Auckland and included several top players from 6 different Sydney club sides. Gault played "a particularly fine game" along with Ririnui and Brodrick in a 23–10 loss in which George Nēpia made a reappearance for the Manukau side. Gault and Ririnui "headed an attack" which eventually saw T. Whye cross for a try. Later in the match he was in the clear but lacked support which could have seen a try. The New Zealand Herald said during the week that followed that "a number of forwards seen against the visitors played high-class football. Their chances of eventually winning a place in the New Zealand team appear bright. They are M. Devine, J. McLeod, G. Mitchell, P. Ririnui, A. Gault, J. Brodrick, M. Hansen, and W. Cameron… they are all fast and splendid handlers".

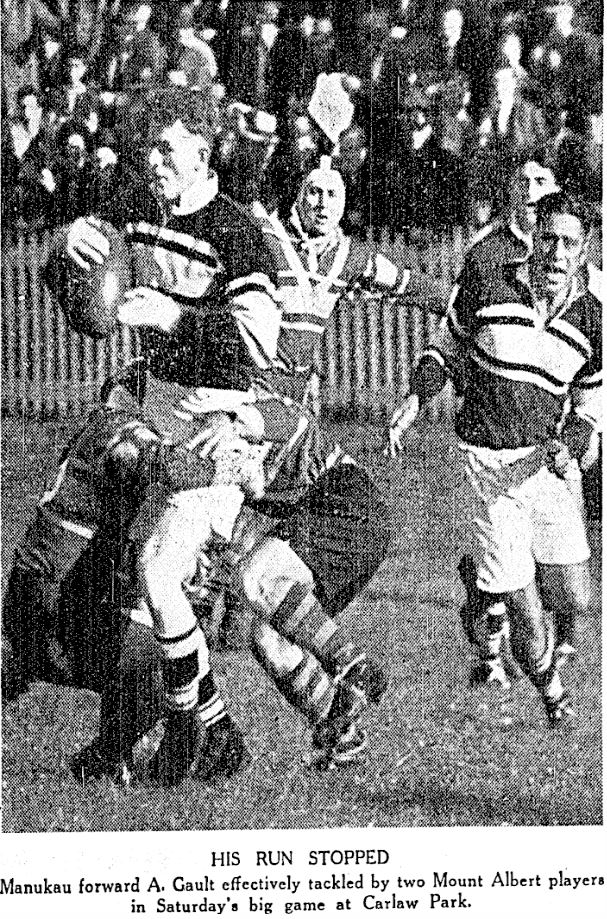

Gault then played in seven consecutive games for Manukau in the Fox Memorial championship. The first was against Papakura on 22 April with Manukau winning 20–0. The Herald said that Gault, Ririnui, and Brodrick "played as well as the three quarters" and were "good in the loose", "playing fine games". In further comments on the Manukau forwards the Herald wrote that "Gault played a sterling game, following up fast and tackling well". He was photographed in the Herald standing in a 2-man tackle in their 38–15 loss to Mt Albert on 6 May. Then in a 15–5 loss to Richmond the following week he scored their only try and "played a dashing game in the forwards". Gault scored again in their round 9 match with Marist on 3 June when they won 26–11. Gault was once again mentioned as one of the best forwards for the winners.

Gault was selected for the Auckland Pākehā team which had begun playing matches a few years prior with the rise of Māori rugby league in the Auckland area. The fixture had become a regular one that had been popular. Gault was named at prop with Richard Shadbolt the other prop and Bert Leatherbarrow at hooker. The Auckland Star said in comments on various players form that "Gault, of Manukau, has consistently maintained a high standard". The Auckland Māori (Tāmaki) side won 19–15 at Carlaw Park on 5 June. Afterwards the Herald wrote that "Ririnui, Mataira, and Gault" had strong claims for selection in the full Auckland representative side in the front row. They mentioned that Gault "is a good battling type of forward".

Somewhat surprisingly Gault was about to play his last known game of rugby league. He played a good game for Manukau against Ponsonby on 10 June which Manukau won 10–6. The Auckland Star wrote "for the winners men who were never far away from where the play was thickest were Gault, Ririnui, and Marsh…" The Herald said that he played a good game along with Ririnui and Waka McLeod. The following week Manukau had a bye in the championship and played a game against Huntly at Waikaraka Park in Onehunga, Manukau's home area however Gault was absent along with other Manukau stars, Jack Hemi, and Jack Brodrick.

It is unknown if he had any further involvement in rugby league or rugby union from this point on. He enlisted in the war in the early 1940s when he would have been around 30 years of age.

== Personal life ==
On 8 June a personal notice appeared in the King Country Chronicle stating "the engagement is announced of Edna May, only daughter of Mr. and Mrs. J. McKenzie, of Whanganui, late of Te Kuiti, to Angus Tait, fourth son of Mr. and the late Mrs. W. Gault, of Scotland".

The electoral roll in 1938 stated that Gault worked at Waitomo Hostel near the Waitomo Caves and was an employee of the government. It was a position he had held since at least 1935 as it was the same in those electoral roll records also. As he was playing rugby league in Auckland in the 1938 season it is likely that he had been returning to the King Country in the of season. The same roll showed that his brother William was still living in the area and farming. The 1938 Onehunga Supplementary Roll recorded Gault as working as a labourer and living at 5 Cameron Street in Onehunga which would have been his occupation and address during the rugby league season. Three years later he was still living on Cameron Street in Onehunga and working as a labourer.

=== War effort ===
In April 1941 Gault's name was drawn in the second ballot for overseas service after he had previously volunteered. he was recorded as living at 55 Onslow Avenue, Epsom at the time. In the New Zealand Gazette of Tuesday, 4 March 1941, the names of all those who had volunteered was listed, with Gault's occupation listed as "slaughterman". The 25 June 1942 New Zealand Gazette stated that Gault was going to be "2nd Lieutenant (temp.)" dated 12 May 1942 along with three other men in the N.Z. Artillery. His Cenotaph record at the Auckland Museum states his service number as WWII 39652 and that he was in the Army branch of the Armed Forces. His address before enlistment was given as 127 The Drive, Epsom, Auckland, while on his embarkation his wife, Rona, was living at 7 Mariri Rd., Onehunga. His other records show that Gault was in the New Zealand Artillery, 215 Composite Anti-Aircraft Battery in the N Force. The N Force was a small New Zealand Army unit of infantry and artillery that garrisoned Norfolk Island between October 1942 and February 1944. The 215th Composite Anti-Aircraft Batter that Gault was a part of were armed with four 3.7-inch anti-aircraft and eight 40-millimetre guns. After returning from the war effort Gault was awarded the War Medal 1939–1945, and the New Zealand War Service Medal.

=== Marriage and working life ===
Gault married Rona Hurst Aspden on 28 December 1940. They had three children, Peter, Gary, and Janice.

After returning from war Gault applied for a Continuous Good Service Licence in late June, 1945. Such a license was to allow the recipient to transport goods in a truck. He was living in Onehunga by this point. By 1946 he still lived in Onehunga but was resident on Mariri Rd, and working as a carrier. He continued to live at the Mariri Rd address and work as a carrier until at least the early 1960s. In 1957 their son Peter Douglas Gault was living with them and working as an electrician according to the 1957 electoral rolls.

By 1966 Gault had moved to Papatoetoe and was living at Edorvale Ave, working as a cartage contractor. It was a profession he stayed in while living in the same area until the 1970s. In the 1970s he moved back to Epsom and was living on Golf Road, working as a contractor in his mid 60s. By 1978 he was listed as being retired but then in 1980 as working back again as a contractor. He would have been aged 68 by this time. The following year in 1981 Gault had moved with Rona back to Onehunga, and lived on Athens Road. It was the same suburb their youngest children, Gary, and Janice were living in.

=== Death ===
Angus Tait Gault died on 23 September 1983, aged 71. His wife Rona died 3 years later in 1986 aged 71.
