= Gallaher Shield =

- Current season or competition: 2026 Gallaher Shield
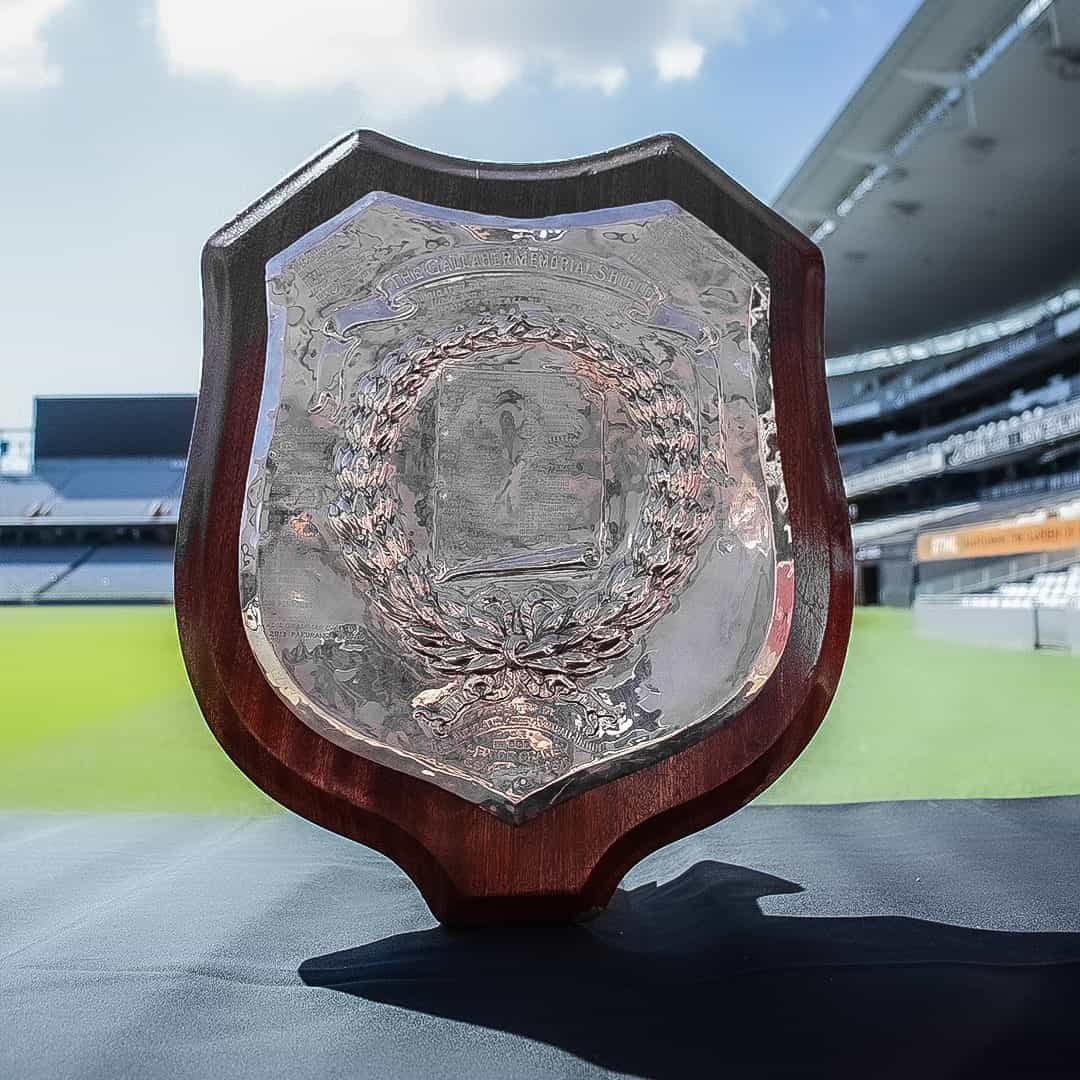
- Sport: Rugby union
- Inaugural season: 1922
- Number of teams: 10
- Country: New Zealand (NZR)
- Holders: University Vipers (2026, 20th title)
- Most titles: Ponsonby (37 titles)
- Website: Auckland Rugby

The Gallaher Shield is awarded to the winner of the Auckland Rugby Union premier men's competition, and was first awarded in 1922. The shield is named in honour of Dave Gallaher, an early stalwart of Ponsonby, Auckland and New Zealand rugby. Ponsonby RFC are by far the most successful club in Auckland history, with 37 shield wins and 48 championships in total.

== Current clubs ==
As of the 2026 season.

Team	Location	Home ground
Auckland University	St Johns, Auckland	Colin Maiden Park
College Rifles	Remuera, Auckland	College Rifles Park
Eden	Sandringham, Auckland	Gribblehirst Park
Grammar TEC	Ōrākei, Auckland	Ōrākei Domain
Manukau Rovers	Māngere, Auckland	Williams Park
Marist	Panmure, Auckland	Mount Wellington War Memorial Park
Pakuranga United	Pakuranga, Auckland	Bell Park
Ponsonby	Western Springs, Auckland	Western Springs Stadium
Suburbs	New Lynn, Auckland	Shadbolt Park
Waitemata	Henderson, Auckland	Waitemata Park

== List of winners ==
The winners of the Auckland premier senior competition are listed below—including the winners for those years prior to the introduction of the Gallaher Shield in 1922:

Year	Winner(s)
1883	Ponsonby (1)
1884	Ponsonby (2)
1885	Ponsonby (3)
1886	Grafton (1)
1887	Ponsonby (4)
1888	Grafton (2)
1889	Gordon (1)
1890	Ponsonby (5)
1891	Parnell (1), Ponsonby (6)
1892	Parnell (2)
1893	Parnell (3)
1894	Parnell (4)
1895	Grafton (3)
1896	City (1), Newton (1), Parnell (5)
1897	Ponsonby (7)
1898	Newton (2)
1899	North Shore (1)
1900	City (2)
1901	Grafton (4)
1902	City (3)
1903	City (4)
1904	Newton (3)
1905	City (5)
1906	City (6)
1907	City (7)
1908	Ponsonby (8)
1909	Ponsonby (9)
1910	Ponsonby (10)
1911	City (8)
1912	Marist (1)
1913	Ponsonby (11)
1914	University (1)
1915	Marist (2)
1916	University (2)
1917	Railway (1)
1918	University (3)
1919	College Rifles (1)
1920	Grammar (1)
1921	Grafton (5)
1922	Grammar (2)
1923	Marist (3)
1924	Ponsonby (12)
1925	Ponsonby (13)
1926	Ponsonby (14)
1927	Ponsonby (15)
1928	University (4)
1929	Ponsonby (16)
1930	Ponsonby (17)
1931	Grammar (3)
1932	Grammar (4)
1933	Marist (4), Ponsonby (18), University (5)
1934	Grafton (6)
1935	Technical (1)
1936	Ponsonby (19)
1937	Ponsonby (20)
1938	Ponsonby (21)
1939	Marist (5)
1940	Takapuna (1)
1941	Papakura Army (1)
1942	Motor Transport Pool (M.T.P.) (1)
1943	Garrison (1)
1944	University (6)
1945	Whenuapai (1)
1946	Grafton (7)
1947	Marist (6)
1948	Ponsonby (22)
1949	University (7)
1950	Marist (7)
1951	Grammar (5)
1952	University (8)
1953	Grammar (6)
1954	Ponsonby (23)
1955	University (9)
1956	Otahuhu (1), University (10)
1957	University (11)
1958	Waitemata (1)
1959	Otahuhu (2)
1960	Otahuhu (3)
1961	Otahuhu (4)
1962	Waitemata (2)
1963	Otahuhu (5)
1964	College Rifles (2)
1965	Otahuhu (6)
1966	University (12)
1967	Grammar (7)
1968	Manukau (1)
1969	Otahuhu (7)
1970	Grammar (8)
1971	University (13)
1972	Grammar (9)
1973	Manukau (2)
1974	University (14)
1975	Waitemata (3)
1976	Ponsonby (24)
1977	Suburbs (1)
1978	Ponsonby (25)
1979	Ponsonby (26)
1980	Takapuna (2)
1981	Ponsonby (27)
1982	Otahuhu (8)
1983	Ponsonby (28)
1984	University (15)
1985	Ponsonby (29)
1986	Ponsonby (30)
1987	University (16)
1988	Ponsonby (31)
1989	Marist (8)
1990	Ponsonby (32)
1991	Marist (9)
1992	Suburbs (2)
1993	Ponsonby (33)
1994	Marist (10)
1995	Ponsonby (34)
1996	Marist (11)
1997	University (17)
1998	Teachers Eastern (1)
1999	Teachers Eastern (2)
2000	Otahuhu (9)
2001	Ponsonby (35)
2002	Ponsonby (36)
2003	Waitemata (4)
2004	Ponsonby (37)
2005	Ponsonby (38)
2006	Ponsonby (39)
2007	Ponsonby (40)
2008	Ponsonby (41)
2009	Ponsonby (42)
2010	Ponsonby (43)
2011	Ponsonby (44)
2012	Grammar Carlton (1)
2013	Pakuranga United (1)
2014	University (18)
2015	Grammar TEC (1)
2016	Suburbs (3)
2017	University (19)
2018	Ponsonby (45)
2019	Ponsonby (46)
2020	Season abandoned due to COVID-19
2021	Eden (1)
2022	Manukau (3)
2023	Manukau (4)
2024	Ponsonby (47)
2025	Ponsonby (48)
2026	University (20)

== Championships by club ==
=== 1883–1921 ===
Rank	Club	Championships	Most recent
1	Ponsonby	11	1913
2	City	8	1911
3=	Grafton	5	1921
3=	Parnell	5	1896
5=	Newton	3	1904
5=	University	3	1918
7	Marist	2	1915
8=	College Rifles	1	1919
8=	Gordon	1	1889
8=	Grammar	1	1920
8=	North Shore	1	1899
8=	Railway	1	1917

=== Gallaher Shield era (1922–present) ===
Rank	Club	Championships	Most recent
1	Ponsonby	37	2025
2	University	17	2026
3=	Marist	9	1996
3=	Otahuhu	9	2000
5	Grammar	8	1972
6=	Waitemata	4	2003
6=	Manukau	4	2023
7=	Suburbs	3	2016
9=	Grafton	2	1946
9=	Grammar Carlton/TEC	2	2015
9=	Takapuna	2	1980
9=	Teachers Eastern	2	1999
13=	College Rifles	1	1964
13=	Eden	1	2021
13=	Garrison	1	1943
13=	M.T.P. (Motor Transport Pool)	1	1942
13=	Pakuranga United	1	2013
13=	Papakura Army	1	1941
13=	Technical	1	1935
13=	Whenuapai	1	1945

=== 1883–present ===
Rank	Club	Championships	Most recent
1	Ponsonby	48	2025
2	University	20	2026
3	Marist	11	1996
4=	Grammar	9	1972
4=	Otahuhu	9	2000
6	City	8	1911
7	Grafton	7	1946
8	Parnell	5	1896
9=	Waitemata	4	2003
9=	Manukau	4	2023
10=	Suburbs	3	2016
10=	Newton	3	1904
13=	College Rifles	2	1964
13=	Takapuna	2	1980
13=	Teachers Eastern	2	1999
16=	Eden	1	2021
16=	Garrison	1	1943
16=	Gordon	1	1889
16=	Grammar Carlton	1	2012
16=	Grammar TEC	1	2015
16=	M.T.P. (Motor Transport Pool)	1	1942
16=	North Shore	1	1899
16=	Papakura Army	1	1941
16=	Pakuranga United	1	2013
16=	Railway	1	1917
16=	Technical	1	1935
16=	Whenuapai	1	1945
