= Eden RFC =

Rugby union club in Sandringham, Auckland, New Zealand

Coordinates: 36.8805104°S 174.7380870°E

(New Zealand) Eden Rugby Club
- Union: Auckland Rugby Union
- Founded: 1922
- Location: Sandringham, Auckland
- Ground: Gribblehirst Park
- President: Phil Hall
- League: Auckland Premier

Official website
- www.eden.rugby

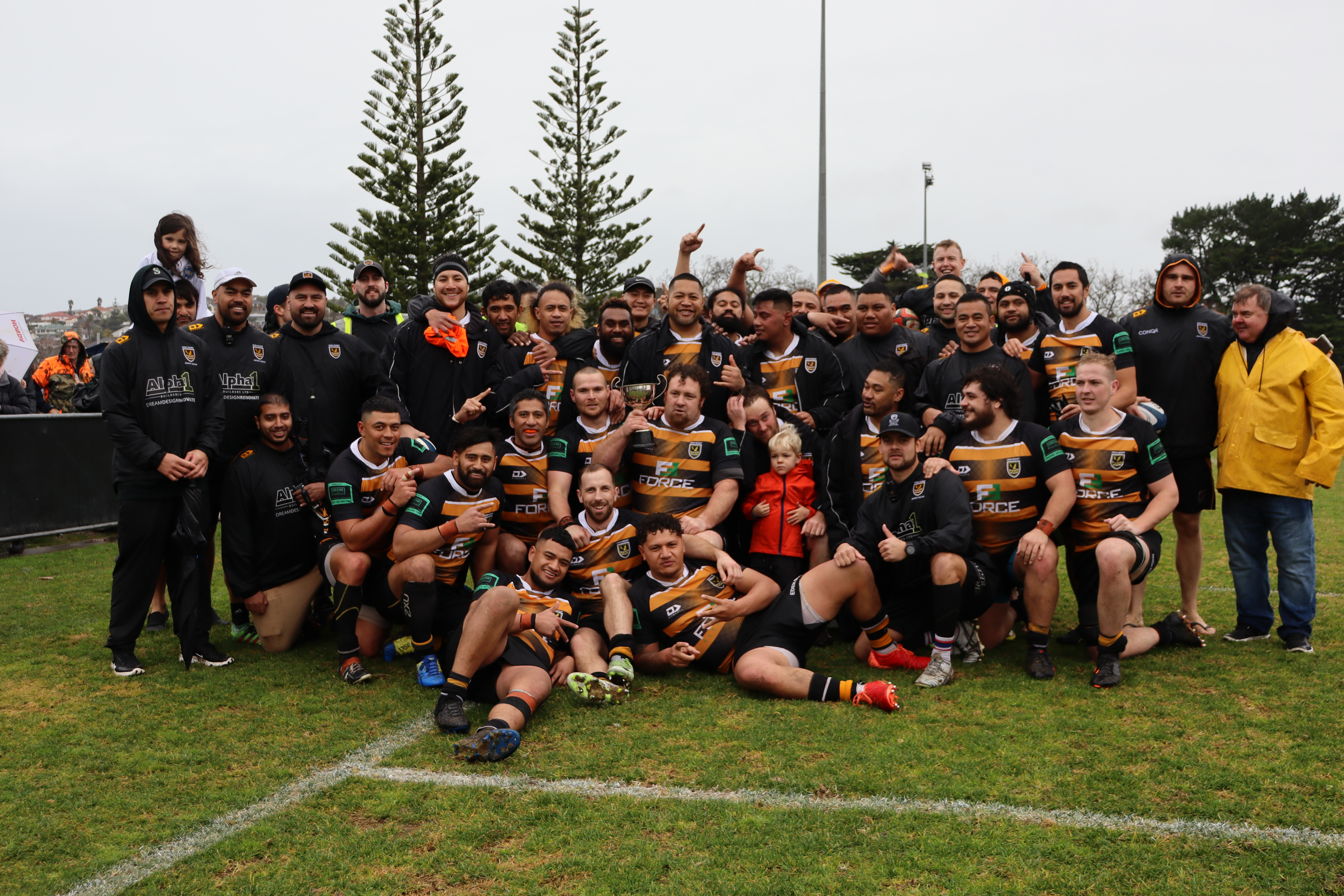
Eden Rugby Premier Development, the "Honeybadgers," pose after beating Pakuranga United in the 2021 George Nicholson Trophy Final 20 - 8.

Eden Rugby Club (formally known as Eden Rugby Football Club) is a rugby union club based in Auckland, New Zealand. The club was established in 1922 and is affiliated with the Auckland Rugby Football Union.

== History ==
Eden was formed in 1922, and in 1930 moved to Gribblehirst Park, where the club has been based since. Eden are the closest club in Auckland to Eden Park, with the club having attempted to build their clubrooms at the ground in the 1920s. Eden won the Gallaher Shield in 2021, beating Grammar TEC 19-10. Six All Blacks – Angus Ta'avao, Bruce McLeod, Frank McMullen, Ron Urlich, Ron Dobson and Hud Rickit – have played for the club, though not at the time of their international selection.

== Current status ==
Today, Eden fields a range of teams at senior and junior level, and also operate a Men's and Women's touch rugby competition during the summer months.

== Internationally Capped Players ==
Name	Country Represented	Years active
Angus Ta'avao	New Zealand	2018-present
Bruce McLeod	New Zealand	1964-70
Frank McMullen	New Zealand	1957-60
Ron Urlich	New Zealand	1970-73
Ron Dobson	New Zealand	1949
Hud Rickit	New Zealand	1981
Sione Tuipulotu	Tonga	2021-present
