= 2019 New Zealand Radio Awards =

- Awarded for: Excellence in radio broadcasting
- Country: New Zealand
- Presented by: Radio Broadcasters Association
- Website: radioawards.co.nz

The 2019 New Zealand Radio Awards were the awards for excellence in the New Zealand radio industry during 2018. It was the 42nd New Zealand Radio Awards, recognising staff, volunteers and contractors in both commercial and non-commercial broadcasting.

== Winners and nominees ==
This is a list of nominees, with winners in bold.

=== Associated Craft Award ===
**Associated Craft Award**

**Alison Watt – The Radio Bureau – The Radio Bureau**

- MediaWorks Trade Marketing Team – Cathy Fali, Jess Knox, Alex Jolly, Tom Groenewegen, Brittany Pannett, Kat Blackburn – MediaWorks
- MediaWorks Operations Team – Nikki Flint, Aileen Lau, Abby Lawrence, Amber Howard, Caitlin Coffey, Finlay Robertson, Jessie Matheson, Kiriana Jones, Anna Bennington, Jess Smith, Jaron Jack, Lauren Potter, Penny Quirk – MediaWorks

=== Best Community Campaign ===
**Best Community Campaign**

**5 Marathons in 5 Days – Dena Roberts, Dominic Harvey, Tom McKenzie, Bex Dewhurst, Ryan Rathbone, Lucy Carthew, Lucy Hills, Clinton Randell, Megan Annear, Ricky Bannister – The Edge Network**

- Petition for Pride – Mel Toomey, Casey Sullivan, Daniel Mac – The Edge Wellington
- Jingle Bail – Leanne Hutchinson, Jason Gunn, Jay-Jay Feeney, Todd Fisher, Matt Anderson – More FM Network

=== Best Content ===
**Best Content Director** **Ryan Rathbone – The Edge Network**: Ross Flahive – ZM Network; Christian Boston – More FM Network	**Best Creative Feature** **Whostalk ZB – Phil Guyan, Josh Couch, Grace Bucknell, Phil Yule, Mike Hosking, Daryl Habraken – Newstalk ZB Network / CBA**: Tarore – John Cowan, Josh Couch, Rangi Kipa, Phil Yule – Newstalk ZB Network / CBA; The Rock Drive with Thane and Dunc – Jeremy Pickford, Duncan Heyde, Thane Kirby, Jack Honeybone, Roisin Kelly – The Rock Network
**Best Podcast** **Gone Fishing – Adam Dudding, Amy Maas, Tim Watkin, Justin Gregory, Rangi Powick, Jason Dorday – RNZ National**: Black Sheep – William Ray, Tim Watkin – RNZ National; BANG! – Melody Thomas, Tim Watkin – RNZ National	**Best Show Producer – Music Show** **Jeremy Pickford – The Rock Drive with Thane and Dunc – The Rock Network**: Alexandra Mullin – The Edge Breakfast with Dom, Meg and Randell – The Edge Network; Ryan Maguire – The Morning Rumble – The Rock Network
**Best Show Producer – Talk Show** **Helen McCarthy – Marcus Lush Nights – Newstalk ZB Network**: Martin Gibson – Morning Report – RNZ National; Carolyn Leaney – The Leighton Smith Show – Newstalk ZB Network	**Best Video** **Deadpool Marathon – Jono, Ben & Sharyn – Jono Pryor, Ben Boyce, Dan Webby, Sharyn Casey, Browynn Baker, Andy Robinson, Jamie Linehan – The Edge Network**: This Is New Zealand – Aaron Ly, Tegan Yorwarth, Tammy Davis, Michael Baker, Willy McAlister, Kara Joy-Rickard, Shawn Cleaver, Leigh Dolbear – George FM Network; Make It Clink – Aaron Ly, Jim Cawthorn, Joe Baxendale, Stacey Wouters, Duncan Heyde, Storm MacDonald, David Smith, Joe Baxendale – The Rock Network

=== Best New Broadcaster ===
**Best New Broadcaster – Journalist** **Logan Church – RNZ National**: Rachel Das – Newstalk ZB Canterbury; Henry Rounce – Newshub Radio Network	**Best New Broadcaster – Off-Air** **Tom Harper – Social Content Coordinator – Hauraki Network**: Sarah Mount – Digital Content Producer – ZM Network; Finlay Robertson – Radio Group Specialist – Edge, Edge TV and Mai – The Edge and Mai Networks
**Best New Broadcaster – On-Air** **Anna Henvest – ZM News / Announcer – ZM Network**: Sinead Howard – George FM Night Host – George FM Network; Brook Ruscoe – Mai Nights – Mai FM Network	

=== Best News & Sport ===
**Best News or Sports Journalist** **Barry Soper – Newstalk ZB Network**: Indira Stewart – RNZ National; Phil Pennington – RNZ National	**Best News Story – Team Coverage** **Checkpoint – Dodgy EQC Repairs – Pip Keane, Bridget Burke – RNZ National** **Jami-Lee Ross Saga – Newstalk ZB News Team – Newstalk ZB Network**: Cyclone Gita – Newstalk ZB News Team – Newstalk ZB Network
**Best Newsreader** **Raylene Ramsay – Newstalk ZB Network**: Nicola Wright – RNZ National; Niva Retimanu – Newstalk ZB Network	**Best Sports Reader, Presenter or Commentator** **D'Arcy Waldegrave & Goran Paladin – D'Arcy and Goran – Radio Sport Network**: Mike Lane, Jeremy Wells, Matt Heath, Leigh Hart, Jason Hoyte, Paul Ford, James McOnie, Lee Baker, Joseph Durie, Alex Hanger, Tom Harper – The ACC Commentary Team – The ACC Network; Nigel Yalden – Radio Sport – Radio Sport Network
**Best Sports Story – Team Coverage** **2018 Gold Coast Commonwealth Games – Radio Sport and NZME Engineering Team – Radio Sport Network**: The Warriors and Shaun Johnson – Radio Sport Team – Radio Sport Network; The ACC Coverage of the Pink Ball Test – Mike Lane, Jeremy Wells, Matt Heath, Paul Ford, James McOnie, Leigh Hart, Jason Hoyte, Lee Baker, Joseph Durie, Alex Hanger, Tom Harper – The ACC Network	

=== Best On Air ===
**Best Music Breakfast Show – Network** **ZM's Fletch, Vaughan & Megan – Carl Fletcher, Vaughan Smith, Megan Papas, Caitlin Marett, James Johnston, Anna Henvest – ZM Network**: The Breakfast Club – Simon Barnett, Gary McCormick, Jason Mac, Lana Searle, Christopher Bond, Samantha Baxter, Chris Goodyear – More FM Network; The Edge Breakfast with Dom, Meg and Randell – Dom Harvey, Meg Annear, Clinton Randell, Tom McKenzie, Alexandra Mullin, Chang Hung, Ryan Rathbone, Lucy Carthew – The Edge Network	**Best Music Breakfast Show – Non-Network** **Callum & P – Callum Procter, Patrina Roche – The Hits Southland**: MORE FM Manawatu Breakfast – Mike West, Gareth Pringle, Kearsley Cranston – More FM Manawatu; More FM Breakfast with John, Flash & Toast – John Markby, Angela 'Flash' Gordon, Tauha 'Toast' TeKani, Bryn Ingham – More FM Northland
**Best Music Host or Team – Non-Surveyed Market** **More FM Rodney Breakfast with Brent and Jacque – Brent Burridge, Jacque Tucker – More FM Rodney**: More FM Breakfast with Andrew Leiataua – Andrew Leiataua – 93.6 More FM Taupo; Bevan for Breakfast – Bevan Chapman – More FM Gisborne & Wairoa	**Best Music Non-Breakfast Host – Network** **Robert Scott – The Breeze Network Drive Show – The Breeze Network**: Estelle Clifford – Nights with Estelle Clifford – The Hits Network; Jen Bainbridge – The Rock Workday – The Rock Network
**Best Music Non-Breakfast Host – Non-Network** **Dave Nicholas – Days with Dave Nicholas – The Hits Auckland** **Will Johnston – Days with Will Johnston – The Hits Tauranga**: Emma Helleur – Days with Emma Helleur – The Hits Taranaki	**Best Music Non-Breakfast Team – Network** **Jono, Ben and Sharyn – Jono Pryor, Ben Boyce, Sharyn Casey, Dan Webby, Ryan Rathbone, Carl Thompson, Hamish Phipps – The Edge Network**: ZM's Bree & Clint – Bree Tomasel, Clint Roberts, Ben McDowell, Ellie Harwood – ZM Network; Jase & Jay-Jay – Jay-Jay Feeny, Jason Gunn, Todd Fisher, Lana Searle – More FM Network
**Best Talk Presenter – Breakfast or Drive** **Mike Hosking – The Mike Hosking Breakfast – Newstalk ZB Network**: Larry Williams – Larry Williams Drive – Newstalk ZB Network; Guyon Espiner & Susie Ferguson – Morning Report – RNZ National	**Best Talk Presenter – Other** **Marcus Lush – Marcus Lush Nights – Newstalk ZB Network**: Leighton Smith – The Leighton Smith Show – Newstalk ZB Network; Kim Hill – Saturday Morning – RNZ National

=== Best Programmes ===
**Best Access Radio Spoken/Informational Programme** **Pandemic – Margaret Crawford, Michael Wilson – Arrow FM**: Simon Frost – Hardman & Kickboxer Discloses Emotional Crisis – Sheldon Brown – Planet FM 104.6; Air Abilities Hour – Jo Casey, Rawdon Wallace, Emily Hickman, Alex Lang, Nathan Lang, Amber Ranson, Celine Jenkins, Emma Ashworth, Tasha Eyles, Olivia Ralph, Hayden Wright, Ryan Thomas – Plains FM	**Best Access Radio Music Programme** Due to insufficient entries, this category was not awarded this year
**Best Children's Programme** **The Crazy Kiwi Christmas Kids Show – Phil Guyan, Bjorn Brickell, Dayna Vawdrey, Levi Guyan, Daryl Habraken, Phil Yule – Christian Broadcasting Assoc & NZME**: That's The Story – Ronnie Mackie, Zoe Nash, John Martin, Josie Ryan, Kate Carey, Alex Bain, Cameron Nash, Rachael Joel, Mark Perry, Chris Nicoll, pupils of Gladstone Primary School & Kōwhai Intermediate – Radio Rhema; Suzy & Friends – Suzy Cato, Trevor Plant, Katie Brunn, Phil Yule – Treehut Limited	**Best Daily or Weekly Feature – Factual** **Insight – Philippa Tolley – RNZ National**: Mediawatch – Colin Peacock, Jeremy Rose – RNZ National; Our Changing World – Alison Ballance – RNZ National
**Best Documentary or Factual Talk Feature** **Insight – Imprisoned by Meth – Teresa Cowie – RNZ National**: Beyond Kate – Sonia Sly, Tim Watkin, Justin Gregory, Marc Chesterman, William Saunders, Jason McClelland, Phil Benge – RNZ National; Insight – Malaysian Plastics Dumping Ground – Nita Blake-Persen – RNZ National	**Best Music Feature or Recorded Live Music Event** **The Rock 1500 – Brad King, Reagan White, Jacqueline Williams, Stacey Wouters, Joe Baxendale, Storm Macdonald, MediaWorks Digital Team – The Rock Network**: Music Alive: Neil Finn and the Auckland Philharmonia – Adrian Hollay, Paddy Hill – RNZ Concert; Jon Toogood's Planet of Sound – Jon Toogood, Greg Prebble – Hauraki Network

=== Best Promotion ===
**Best Client Promotion/Activation – Network** **ACC – Mammoth Steady The Ship – Alternative Commentary Team – Hauraki Network**: Matt & Jerry's Excellent IPL Adventure – Hauraki Network Team – Hauraki Network; Singapore Boarding Call – Hauraki Network Team – Hauraki Network	**Best Client Promotion/Activation – Single Market** **Fletch, Vaughan & Megan's Car Raffle – Ruby Bain, Mary Outram, Jimmy Farrant, Caitlin Marett, Anna Henvest, James Johnston, Carl Fletcher, Vaughan Smith, Megan Papas, Jordyn Mihell – ZM Christchurch**: Wild Engagement Wellington Zoo – James Pugsley, Anna Strachan, Nikita McGoram, Hayley Bath – The Hits Wellington; Sky City Go For Gold – Carlyn Reed – Mai FM Auckland
**Best Digital and Social Content** **The Edge Digital – Ricky Bannister, Lucy Carthew, Michael Baker, Chanel Potaka, Samuel Fullick, Amber Khoo, Mita Henare – The Edge Network**: The Rock – Roisin Kelly, Jack Honeybone, Chanel Potaka, Michael Baker, Amber Khoo, Mita Henare, Aaron Ly, Megan Vasey, Jerome Sears, Samuel Fullick – The Rock Network; #Rock1500 – Samuel Fullick, Michael Baker, Roisin Kelly, Jack Honeybone, Chanel Potaka, Aaron Ly, Megan Vasey, Amber Khoo, Mita Henare – The Rock Network	**Best Marketing Campaign** **The Edge Safe House – The Edge Network Staff – The Edge Network** **Friday Jams LIVE – Jacqui Robins, Emily Hancox, Ross Flahive, Dannii Gardiner, Ashleigh Van Graan – ZM Network**: Flochella – Jacqui Robins, Ross Flahive, Dannii Gardiner, Ashleigh Van Graan – ZM Network
**Best Network Station Promotion** **ZM's Secret Sound – ZM Network Team – ZM Network**: The Bisexualor – Bree Tomasel, Clint Roberts, Ben McDowell, Ellie Harwood, Jordyn Mihell – ZM Network; Jingle Bail – Leanne Hutchinson, Jason Gunn, Jay-Jay Feeney, Todd Fisher, Matt Anderson – More FM Network	**Best Single Market Station Promotion** **The Breeze Royal Corgi Classic – Will Maisey, Emily Reid, Grace Rhynd – The Breeze Auckland**: Six60 Dunedin – Emma Walsh, Callum Procter, Patrina Roche – The Hits Dunedin; Renew Your Vows – Emily Reid, Robert Rakete, Jeanette Thomas, Robert Scott, Tania Burgess – The Breeze Auckland

=== Best Radio Creative ===
**Best Creative Commercial – Single or Campaign** **NDC – Concentrate – Alastair Barran, Chris Hurring – The Edge Northland**: iHeart Audiences Defined – Glenn Dwight – Hauraki Network; Four Seasons Commercial Cleaning – Vacuum – Shara Benitez, Sam Dunlop-Doyle – Newstalk ZB, ZM Timaru; NDC – Winter Campaign – Alastair Barran, Chris Hurring – More FM Northland; NDC – Bad News Travels Fast – Alastair Barran, Chris Hurring – Mai FM Northland	**Best Voice Talent** **Paul Corbett – MediaWorks Network**: Ronnie Mackie – NZME & Rhema Media; Hannah Venneman – MediaWorks Network
**Most Effective Commercial – Single or Campaign** **Red Cross Ready – Liam Kilmister, Reilly Borg – MediaWorks Network**: Sleep Drops – Invest In The Dream – Paul Corbett, Kirsten Taylor – MediaWorks Network; Spookers – Halloween – Alastair Barran, Chris Hurring – The Edge Auckland	

=== Best Technical Production ===
**Best Commercial Production** **NDC – Ice – Chris Hurring, Alastair Barran – Mai FM Northland**: NDC – Distraction – Chris Hurring, Alastair Barran – Mai FM Northland; NDC – The Fog – Chris Hurring, Alastair Barran – Mai FM Northland	**Best Station Imaging** **Alistair Cockburn – ZM Network**: Grant Brodie – The Edge Auckland; Dean Young – The Sound Network
**Best Station Trailer** **ZM's Friday Jams Live – Alistair Cockburn – ZM Network**: ZM's Secret Sound – Alistair Cockburn – ZM Network; Fletch, Vaughan & Megan's Long Weekend Group Toot – Alistair Cockburn – ZM Network	

=== Sales Team of the Year ===
**Sales Team of the Year**

**The Radio Bureau – Peter Richardson, Jane Hitchfield, Karen McPherson, Fraser McGregor, Jennifer Came, Missy Dare, Michael Matthews, Kenneth D'Souza, Thomas Raybould, Dusan Matic, Ally Watt, Hannah Bourke, Liam Edkins, Ellen-Marie Atkinson – The Radio Bureau National**

- MediaWorks Otago – Janine Tindall-Morice, Ben Patston, Sonya Fraser, Dan Murphy, Anna Esquilant, Priscilla Dixon, Sally Richards, James Morris, Alice Wisker – MediaWorks Otago
- MediaWorks Whanganui – Christina Emery, Sue Fothergill, Rahul Gujral – MediaWorks Whanganui
- MediaWorks Network Agency – Donna Gurney, Gerhard Simanke, Matt Tattle, Philippa Stiebel, Paul Glaister, Rob Dickey, Mike Berry, Maggie Campbell, Georgia Ramage, Nicole Jones, Scott Bibby, Jude Taylor – MediaWorks Network Agency

=== Station of the Year ===
**Station of the Year – Network** **ZM – Ross Flahive – ZM Network**: The Edge – Ryan Rathbone – The Edge Network; RNZ National – David Allan – RNZ National	**Station of the Year – Non-Surveyed Market** **Sun FM – Jarrod Dodd – Sun FM**: Radio 1XX – Glenn Smith – Radio 1XX; 93.6 More FM – Irene Nottage – 93.6 More FM
**Station of the Year – Surveyed Market** **More FM Manawatu – Willie Furnell – More FM Manawatu**: More FM Canterbury – Jason Mac – More FM Canterbury; Breeze Wellington – Hale Speedy – Breeze Wellington	

=== 'The Blackie Award' ===
'**The Blackie Award'**

**Fletch, Vaughan & Megan's Final Conversion – Carl Fletcher, Vaughan Smith, Megan Papas, Caitlin Marett, James Johnston, Anna Henvest – ZM Network**

**Deadpool Marathon – Jono Pryor, Ben Boyce, Sharyn Casey, Dan Webby – The Edge Network**

- Operation Rog Rage – Roger Farrelly, Andrew Mulligan, Bryce Casey, Ryan Maguire, John Day – The Rock Network

=== The Johnny Douglas Award ===
**The Johnny Douglas Award**

**Tupou Sopoaga – The Pulse**

- Samuel Robinson – The Pulse
- Mathew Widdows – Static FM

=== Outstanding Contribution to Radio ===
**Outstanding Contribution to Radio**

**Simon Barnett**

=== Services to Broadcasting ===
**Services to Broadcasting**

**Brian Pauling**

**Darryl Paton**

**Larry Williams**

=== Special Recognition Award ===
**Special Recognition Award**

**Dominic Harvey**

=== 50 Years' Service to NZ Radio Industry ===
**50 Years' Service to NZ Radio Industry**

**Geoff Anderson, Peak FM**

**Gavin McGinley, Radio New Zealand**
