= Gribblehirst Park =

Park in Auckland, New Zealand

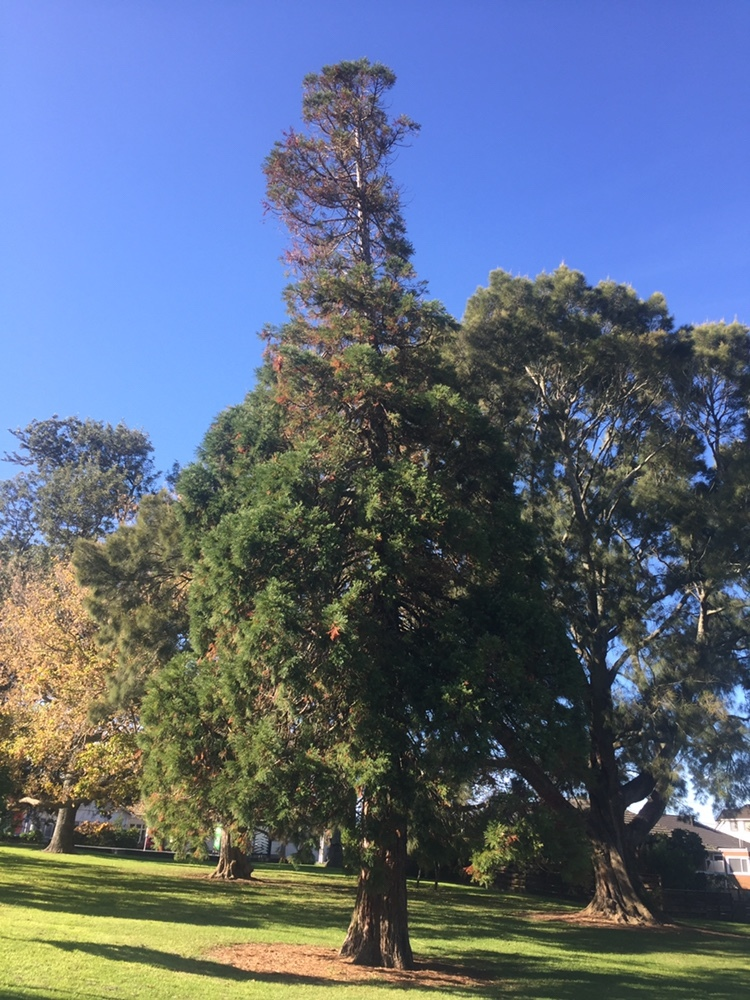
- A Sequoiadendron giganteum in Gribblehirst Park
- Interactive map of Gribblehirst Park
- Type: Public park
- Location: Auckland, New Zealand
- Coordinates: 36.880445°S 174.7379291°E
- Area: 5.9 hectares (15 acres)
- Operator: Auckland Council
- Status: Open year round

Gribblehirst Park is a park in central Auckland, New Zealand, close to the suburbs of Sandringham and Morningside. Originally the park was known as Cabbage Tree Swamp.

== Description ==
Gribblehirst Park is a 5.9-hectare park in Sandringham. The park has a mix of playgrounds, sports fields, a half-basketball court, and forested areas. It is accessible by Sandringham Road, Aroha Avenue, and Kenneth Avenue, and is bisected by a pathway named Cabbage Tree Swamp Drive. The park contains a large rose garden near Aroha Avenue and a small section of remnant lava rock forest.

The park is home to Gribblehirst Community Hub, a community centre for the area, the Auckland Central Community Shed, the former site of the Edendale Bowling Club and Eden RFC, a rugby union club.

== History ==
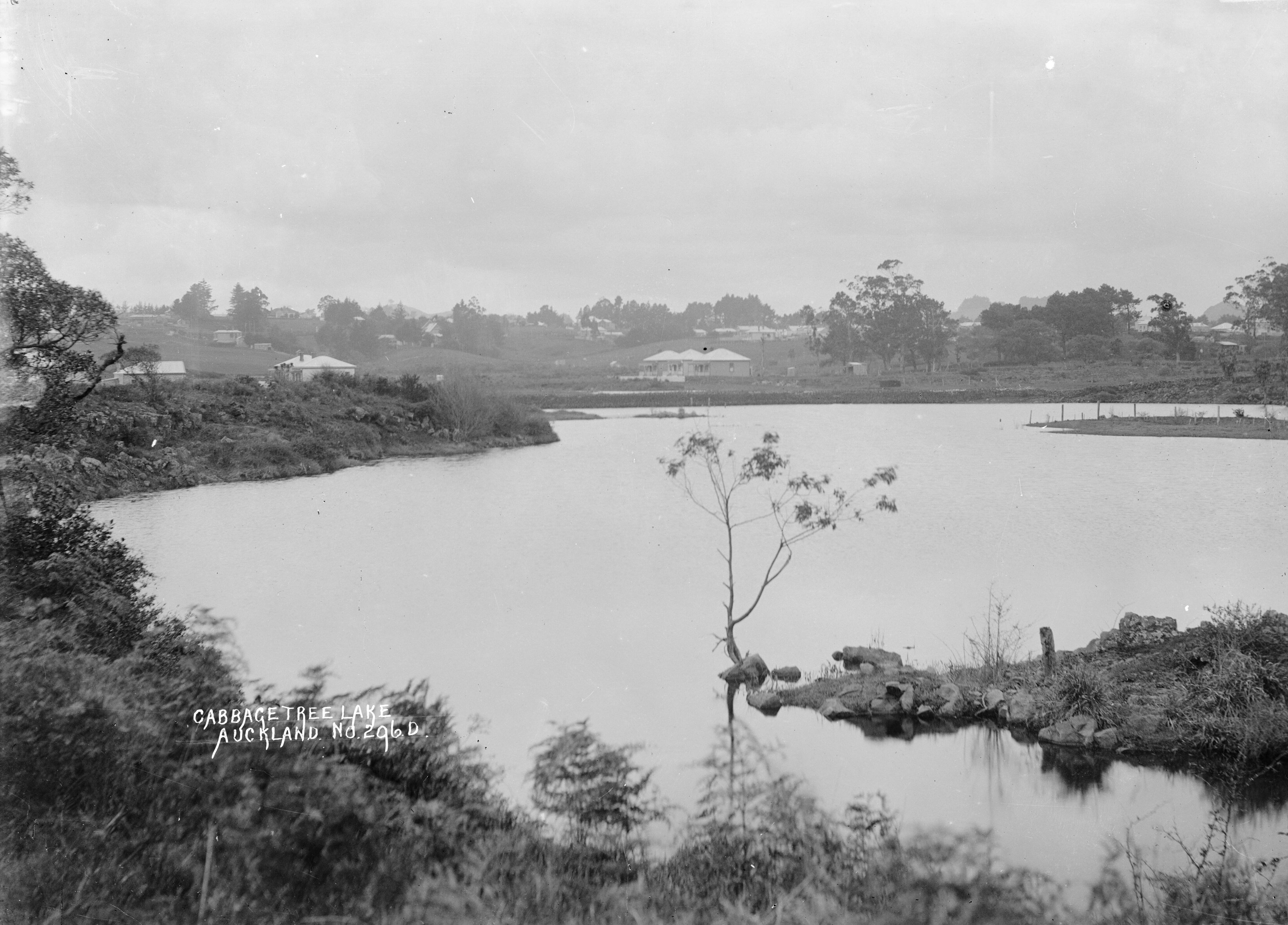
Cabbage Tree Swamp in the early 1900s

The area was originally swampland and known to Tāmaki Māori as Ngā Anawai, referring to the water-filled lava-flow caves that formed in the area. The lava caves were created by Maungawhau / Mount Eden and Mount Albert over 30,000 years ago. Tāmaki Māori used the swamp to collect food and materials. The area was known to early European residents as Cabbage Tree Swamp, due to the number of tī kōuka (cabbage trees) that lined the swampland.

The Sandringham area was used primarily for dairy farming during the early colonial era. Sandringham, especially the area near Cabbage Tree Swamp, was known to regularly flood. A stone bridge named Gribble's Bridge was constructed near the modern-day park, for traffic to safely bypass areas that regularly flooded. In 1880, the New Zealand native weevil Peristoreus viridipennis was first described in the swamp.

The Auckland City Council acquired fourteen acres of Cabbage Tree Swamp in 1927, donated by the families of early Auckland residents S. L. Hirst and James Gribble. After the swamp was drained and the ground levelled, Gribblehirst Park opened on 28 March 1931. The park quickly became a venue used regularly by Kowhai Junior High School, the Auckland Rugby Football Union, Eden RFC, and Mt. Albert Amateur Athletic Club. In 1931, a playground was established at the park, and in 1937 two cricket wickets were formed. In 1938, the Edendale Bowling Club began leasing land at the park.

In 1942 during World War II, a station to clean residents in the event of a gas attack was constructed. This building was later converted into a sports pavilion.

The playground was upgraded in 1974, and again between 1998 and 2007, when a flying fox was added to the park.

Since 2016 the bowling club building has been leased by The Auckland Central Shed (a branch of Menzshed NZ) downstairs, and the Gribblehirst Community Hub upstairs, who also hold the lease to the greens.
