= Sandringham, New Zealand =

Sandringham
- Suburb
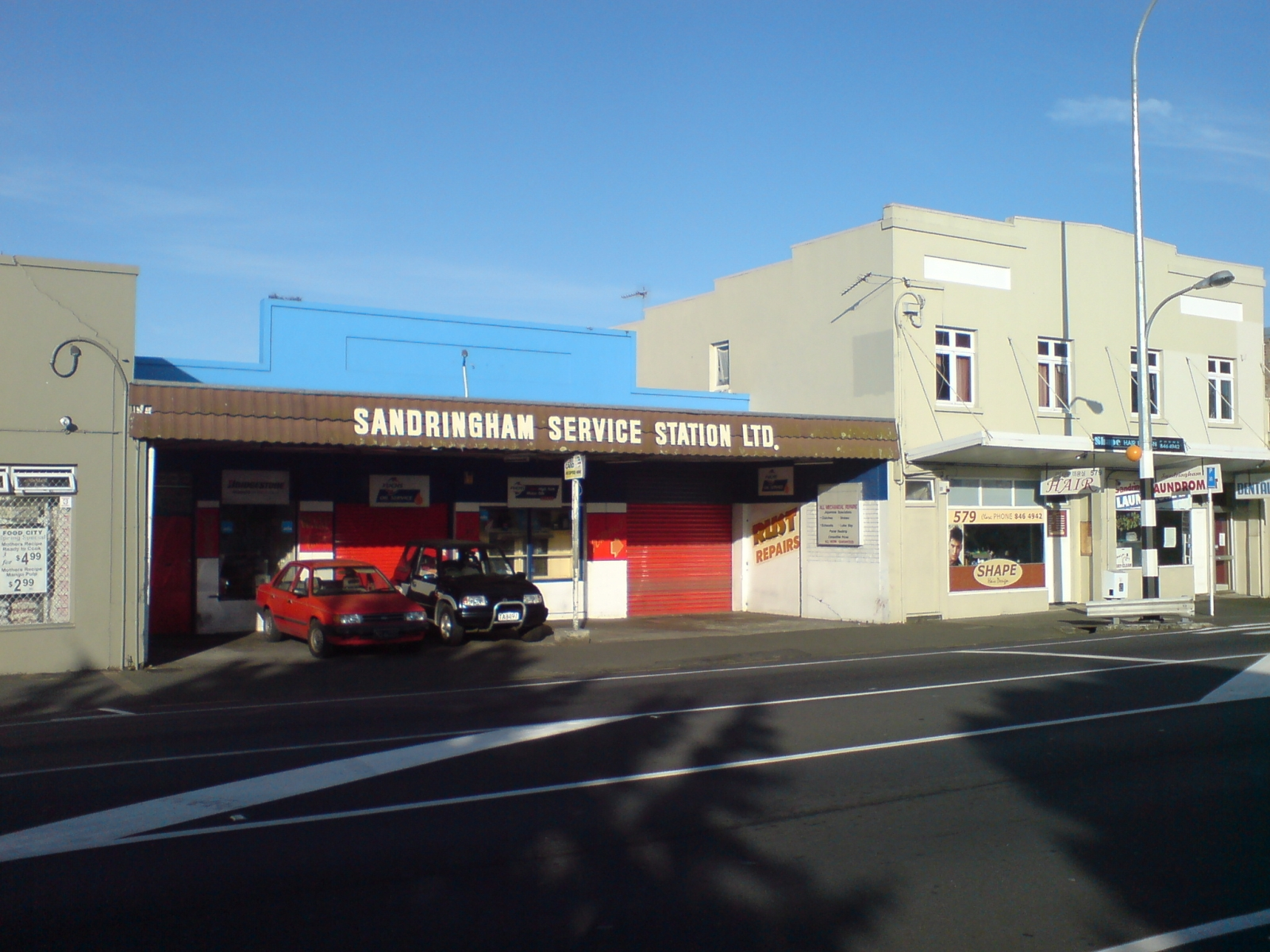
- Part of the Sandringham village area
- Interactive map of Sandringham
- Coordinates: 36.89268°S 174.73653°E
- Country: New Zealand
- City: Auckland
- Local authority: Auckland Council
- Electoral ward: Albert-Eden-Puketāpapa ward
- Local board: Albert-Eden Local Board

Area
  - Land: 252 ha (620 acres)

Population (June 2025)
  - Total: 12,500
  - Density: 4,960/km^{2} (12,800/sq mi)

Morningside; St Lukes	Mount Eden	Mount Eden
Mount Albert	Sandringham	Balmoral
Owairaka	Wesley	Mount Roskill

Sandringham (Māori: Hanaringihama) is a suburb of Auckland, New Zealand. It is a multi-ethnic suburb with a population of over 12,000.

Sandringham Village is a walk of a few hundred metres south along Sandringham Rd from the Outer Link bus route, and has a strong South Asian influence in restaurants and small supermarkets, Halal butchers and Bollywood movies. Nearby are Mt Eden, Kingsland, and Chinese-influenced Balmoral. The village has a post office, pharmacy, medical and legal practices, a real estate agency and a community centre.

The village architecture is art deco influenced, and most has survived, except the original village cinema. The surrounding streets are wooden villas and bungalows from the 1920s and 1930s.

The volcanic cone of Owairaka (Mt Albert) forms Sandringham’s view to the west, and the Roy Clements Treeway on Meola Creek leads from nearby Ferguson Avenue to Rocket Park and the Mt Albert Community Centre.

Sandringham was named after the country house of Edward, Prince of Wales in Norfolk, England, still used by the present royal family.

The main road is Sandringham Road which runs more or less north-south. At the northern end, Kingsland is located near the Eden Park stadium. Sandringham Village is located at the southern end of Sandringham Road just before it connects with Mount Albert Road. The top New Zealand football club Central United play at the Kiwitea Street Stadium in Sandringham. SPiCE (Sandringham Project in Community Empowerment) is an active community-led development organisation set up by local residents in 2013 that runs activities, events and projects in and around Sandringham. The local secondary schools are Mount Albert Grammar School, Marist College and St Peter's College.

== History ==
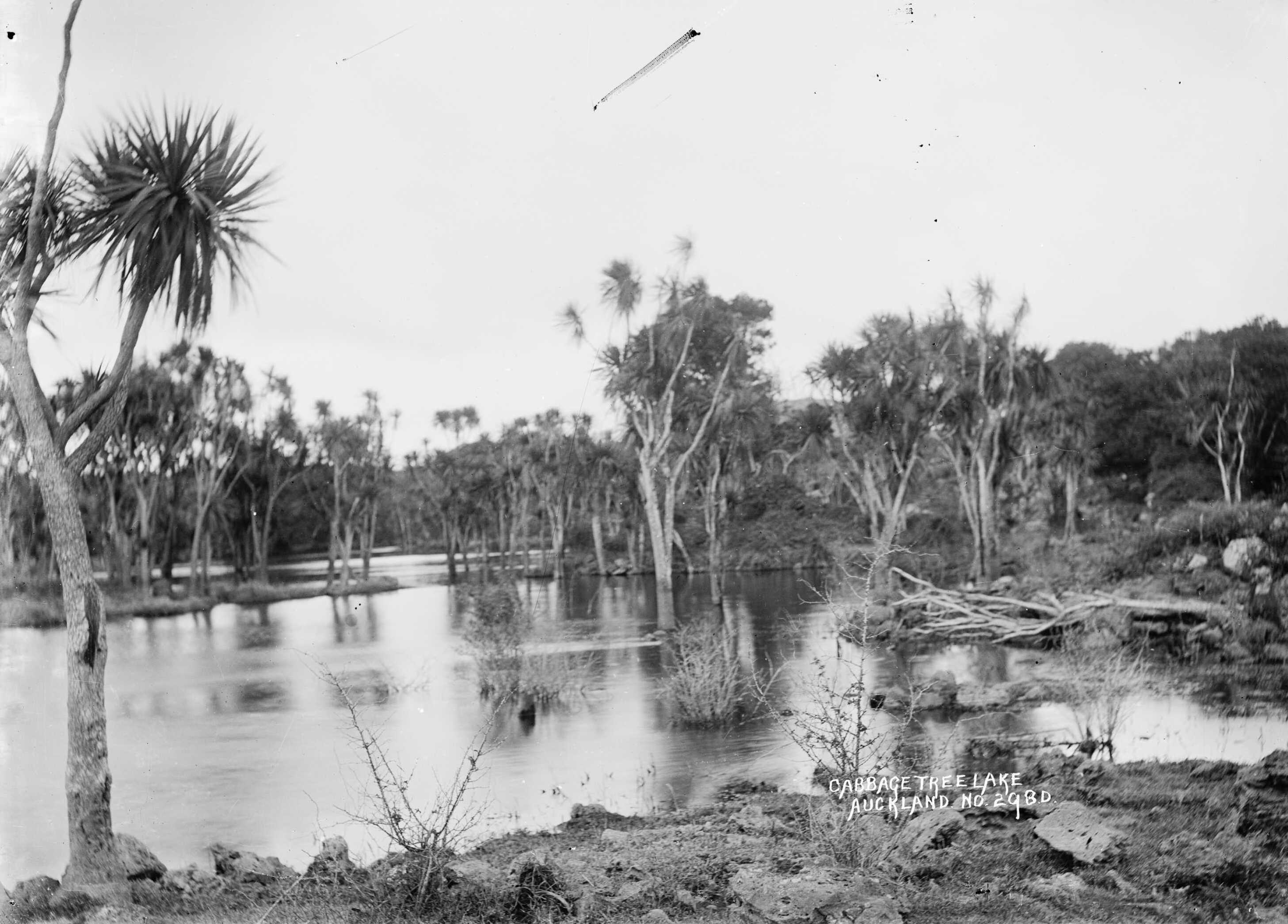
Cabbage Tree Swamp, modern-day Gribblehirst Park, circa 1910

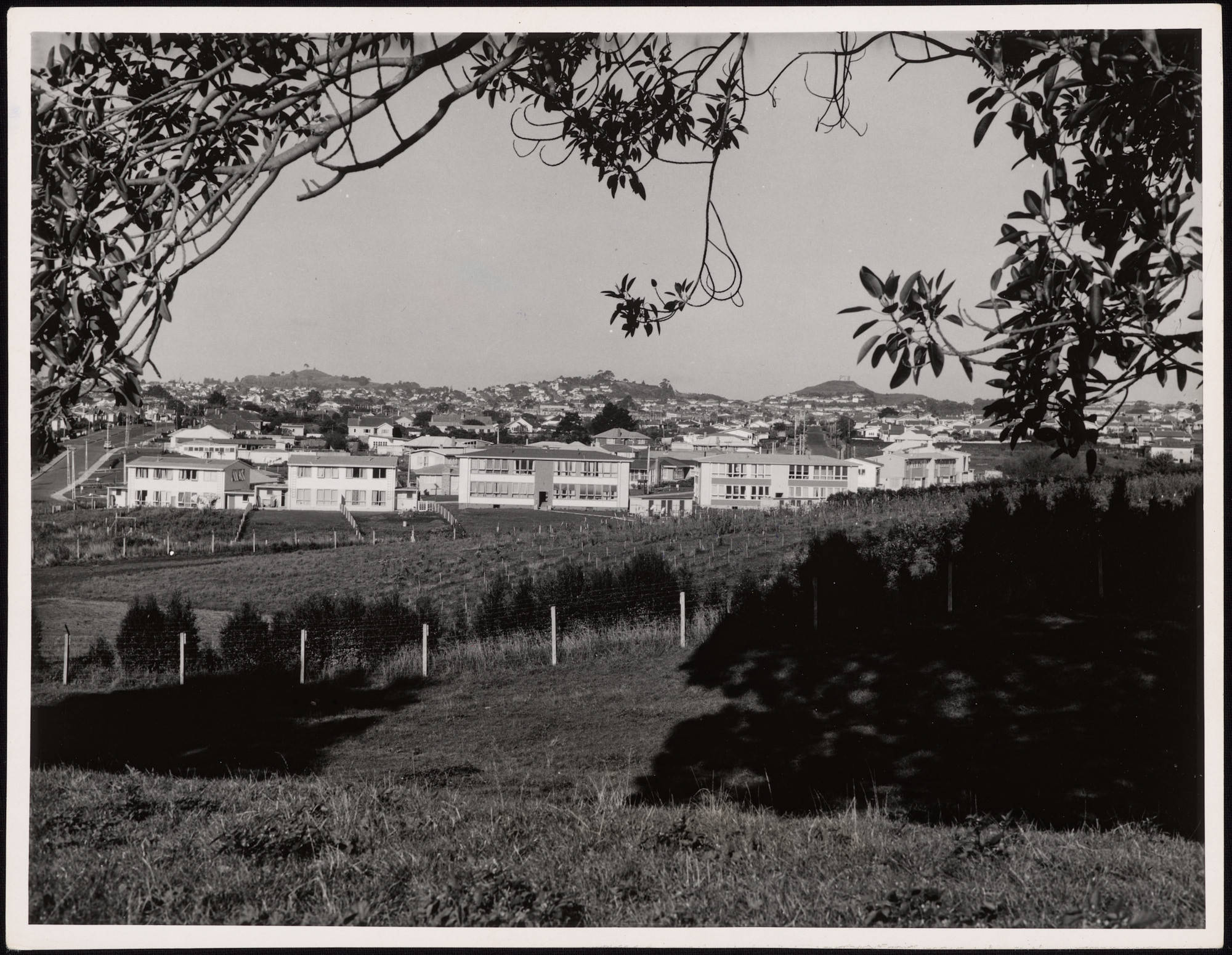
Suburban duplex flats on Haverstock Road, Sandringham, in 1960

The broader area was originally swampland, and known to Tāmaki Māori as Ngā Anawai, referring to the water-filled lava-flow caves that formed in the area. The lava caves were created by Maungawhau / Mount Eden and Mount Albert over 30,000 years ago. The area, especially the northern section near Gribblehirst Park was known to early European residents as Cabbage Tree Swamp, due to the number of tī kōuka (cabbage trees) that lined the swampland.

On 29 June 1841, the Sandringham area was sold to the Crown by Ngāti Whātua, as a part of a 12,000 acre section. The Sandringham suburb began as a small farming settlement known as Cabbage Tree Swamp, named for the prevalence of cordyline australis and the area's predisposition to flooding. The first European settlers in the area were mainly engaged in dairy farming or market gardening. By 1862, there were sixteen properties along what was then Cabbage Tree Swamp Road. In 1877, Cabbage Tree Swamp residents successfully lobbied to have the road's name changed to Kingsland Road. The road and suburb were renamed again as Edendale in 1916.

During the early 20th century, the suburb of Edendale began to develop along the "dog-leg" of Edendale Road (the former name for Sandringham Road). Growth in the area lagged behind many other close-by suburbs, due to major issues with flooding. Eden Park and Gribblehirst Park became lakes during heavy winter rain, as did the reserve land east of the Sandringham shops. In 1917, the Edendale Ratepayers Progressive Association was formed, and petitioned the New Zealand Government for extra rates to help address flooding. After a heavy storm in 1919, locals recalled boating through the streets and floodwaters "flowing through the bay windows" of one low-lying house. There was no water supply in the district by 1900 and by 1924 the area was still without gas or electricity.

The suburb flourished in the 1920s, and in November 1929 the area changed its name to Sandringham. Substantial development only came around 1925 with the construction of the tramline, resulting in the core of what is now Sandringham Village being built. Rows of evenly spaced streets spread on each side of Sandringham Road and were lined with wooden California-style bungalows. Large parts of the area remained undeveloped however, and services such as telephone, electricity and gas were only provided at a minimum level. Over the following decades more retail buildings were constructed in Sandringham Village. Around 1927, the Mayfair Cinema was built, an elegant building in the Neo-Greek style; it was demolished in the early 1990s. The Sandringham Service Station, still operating in 2011, was first erected by Sydney Waring in 1929.

As part of the Eden electorate, Sandringham became a no-licence area from 1909 until 2000, meaning that alcohol could not be sold. As a result, there were no public houses in Sandringham until the opening of Prague Bar 2011 (now closed) which was followed by the opening of Lord Kitchener Pub in 2016 . Earlier plans to build a tavern at 597 Sandringham Road were successfully opposed by residents in 2001.

After the Second World War, what little remained of the farmland was developed as state housing. Sandringham Village is a virtually intact example of an interwar suburban shopping precinct. The shopping village prospered in the 1950s and 1960s, however was much smaller than commercial streets in neighbouring suburbs such as Mount Albert and Kingsland.

During the 1980s and 1990s, Sandringham became a hub for ethnic communities in Auckland, after gentrification in the inner suburbs close to the Auckland city centre became unaffordable. After the 1987 Fijian coups d'état, a substantial Indo-Fijian community developed in Sandringham. The first Indian restaurant, Stan's Halal Hotpot was opened in 2001 followed by Satya's in 2006. An increasing number of South Asian restaurants have opened in Sandringham village which has led to it often being referred to as Auckland's "Little India".

== Demographics ==
Sandringham covers 2.52 km^{2} (0.97 sq mi) and had an estimated population of 12,500 as of June 2025, with a population density of 4,960 people per km^{2}.

Historical population
Year	Pop.	±% p.a.
2006	10,911	—
2013	11,244	+0.43%
2018	12,060	+1.41%
2023	11,514	−0.92%

Sandringham had a population of 11,514 in the 2023 New Zealand census, a decrease of 546 people (−4.5%) since the 2018 census, and an increase of 270 people (2.4%) since the 2013 census. There were 5,664 males, 5,754 females and 99 people of other genders in 3,984 dwellings. 6.3% of people identified as LGBTIQ+. The median age was 34.9 years (compared with 38.1 years nationally). There were 2,004 people (17.4%) aged under 15 years, 2,661 (23.1%) aged 15 to 29, 5,745 (49.9%) aged 30 to 64, and 1,104 (9.6%) aged 65 or older.

People could identify as more than one ethnicity. The results were 53.5% European (Pākehā); 8.1% Māori; 11.1% Pasifika; 36.5% Asian; 3.1% Middle Eastern, Latin American and African New Zealanders (MELAA); and 1.3% other, which includes people giving their ethnicity as "New Zealander". English was spoken by 93.0%, Māori language by 1.7%, Samoan by 2.5%, and other languages by 31.3%. No language could be spoken by 1.9% (e.g. too young to talk). New Zealand Sign Language was known by 0.3%. The percentage of people born overseas was 43.1, compared with 28.8% nationally.

Religious affiliations were 25.1% Christian, 11.3% Hindu, 3.4% Islam, 0.3% Māori religious beliefs, 1.8% Buddhist, 0.4% New Age, 0.2% Jewish, and 2.1% other religions. People who answered that they had no religion were 50.5%, and 5.1% of people did not answer the census question.

Of those at least 15 years old, 4,242 (44.6%) people had a bachelor's or higher degree, 3,339 (35.1%) had a post-high school certificate or diploma, and 1,932 (20.3%) people exclusively held high school qualifications. The median income was $50,300, compared with $41,500 nationally. 1,743 people (18.3%) earned over $100,000 compared to 12.1% nationally. The employment status of those at least 15 was that 5,517 (58.0%) people were employed full-time, 1,215 (12.8%) were part-time, and 279 (2.9%) were unemployed.

Individual statistical areas
Name	Area (km^{2})	Population	Density (per km^{2})	Dwellings	Median age	Median income
Sandringham North	0.86	3,693	4,294	1,299	35.1 years	$54,500
Sandringham Central	0.47	2,271	4,832	783	33.9 years	$43,700
Sandringham West	0.48	2,382	4,963	783	34.5 years	$54,100
Sandringham East	0.72	3,171	4,404	1,122	35.7 years	$45,900
New Zealand					38.1 years	$41,500

== Education ==
Edendale School is a coeducational contributing primary school (years 1-6) with a roll of 490 as of March 2026. Other local schools include Good Shepherd, Balmoral School and Maungawhau Primary. Te Kura Kaupapa Maori o Nga Maungarongo, where the New Zealand School curriculum is taught in the Maori language, is on Haverstock Road. Local intermediates include Balmoral School, Kōwhai Intermediate School and Wesley Intermediate. The local secondary schools are Mount Albert Grammar School, Marist College and St Peter's College.

== Landmarks ==
- Waring Shops - This block of narrow shops was constructed in 1923 and takes its name from the local grocer at the time. The shop has maintained its look, with the same white painted exterior it has always had. It is now a T-shirt shop and electrician's office.
- Sandringham Community Centre - the community centre is an important gathering place, with an expanding range of classes and bookings for personal and community events. Two community playgroups meet in facilities behind the community centre : a Muslim group Tuesdays and Thursday mornings, and the general community group Monday, Wednesday and Friday mornings.

== Sports ==
Sandringham is home to Eden Rugby Football Club and the Mt Albert Ramblers softball club. Edendale Reserve has a playing field for amateur sport.

=== Association football ===
Sandringham is home to the New Zealand association football club Central United who compete in the Lotto Sport Italia NRFL Premier.

== Transportation ==
Public transportation extended from the city centre to the surrounding areas in the late 1870s, with horse-drawn buses being the first mode of regular public transportation. At the beginning of the 20th century, trams began connecting areas such as Mt Eden, Balmoral, Kingsland, and Mt Albert with the city, which enabled the suburban development of those areas. The Auckland trams ran for the last time in the 1950s.

Sandringham is well served by south-bound buses, and is only 7 km from the Auckland CBD. The centre of all the shopping and business activities in Sandringham village is along Sandringham Road, roughly between Halesowen Avenue and Lambeth Road. By vehicle Sandringham can be accessed from the Northwestern Motorway (SH16) via St Lukes Road.

== Local Government ==
In October 1866, the Mt Albert District Highway Board, the first local government in the area, was formed to administer New North Road and the surrounding areas. In 1911, the board became the Mount Albert Borough, who elected a mayor. In 1978, Mount Albert became a city, and in 1989 it was absorbed into Auckland City. In November 2010, all cities and districts of the Auckland Region were amalgamated into a single body, governed by the Auckland Council.

Sandringham falls within the Mt Albert constituency for the national Parliament. In terms of local government, Sandringham is a part of the Albert-Eden local board area. The residents of Albert-Eden elect a local board, and two councillors from the Albert-Eden-Puketāpapa ward to sit on the Auckland Council.

== Climate ==
Climate data for Sandringham (Ōwairaka, 1991–2020 normals, extremes 1949–2008)
Month	Jan	Feb	Mar	Apr	May	Jun	Jul	Aug	Sep	Oct	Nov	Dec	Year
Record high °C (°F)	28.7 (83.7)	30.5 (86.9)	28.7 (83.7)	26.7 (80.1)	24.4 (75.9)	21.1 (70.0)	20.0 (68.0)	20.0 (68.0)	21.5 (70.7)	23.5 (74.3)	25.3 (77.5)	27.8 (82.0)	30.5 (86.9)
Mean daily maximum °C (°F)	23.5 (74.3)	24.0 (75.2)	22.7 (72.9)	20.4 (68.7)	18.0 (64.4)	15.7 (60.3)	14.9 (58.8)	15.4 (59.7)	16.7 (62.1)	17.9 (64.2)	19.6 (67.3)	21.8 (71.2)	19.2 (66.6)
Daily mean °C (°F)	19.4 (66.9)	20.0 (68.0)	18.6 (65.5)	16.4 (61.5)	14.3 (57.7)	12.1 (53.8)	11.1 (52.0)	11.6 (52.9)	12.8 (55.0)	14.3 (57.7)	15.8 (60.4)	18.0 (64.4)	15.4 (59.7)
Mean daily minimum °C (°F)	15.4 (59.7)	16.0 (60.8)	14.5 (58.1)	12.4 (54.3)	10.6 (51.1)	8.4 (47.1)	7.2 (45.0)	7.7 (45.9)	9.0 (48.2)	10.6 (51.1)	12.0 (53.6)	14.3 (57.7)	11.5 (52.7)
Record low °C (°F)	6.8 (44.2)	6.9 (44.4)	2.0 (35.6)	2.1 (35.8)	0.0 (32.0)	−2.5 (27.5)	−2.3 (27.9)	−1.3 (29.7)	0.2 (32.4)	2.2 (36.0)	4.1 (39.4)	5.2 (41.4)	−2.5 (27.5)
Average rainfall mm (inches)	73.7 (2.90)	65.6 (2.58)	90.5 (3.56)	101.8 (4.01)	108.5 (4.27)	124.1 (4.89)	146.8 (5.78)	116.0 (4.57)	103.0 (4.06)	100.8 (3.97)	89.8 (3.54)	92.6 (3.65)	1,213.2 (47.78)
Source: NIWA (rainfall 1981–2010)

== See also ==
- Bharatiya Mandir Hindu Temple

== Bibliography ==
- Dunsford, Deborah (2016). Mt Albert Then and Now: a History of Mt Albert, Morningside, Kingsland, St Lukes, Sandringham and Owairaka. Auckland: Mount Albert Historical Society. ISBN 978-0-473-36016-0. OCLC 964695277. Wikidata Q117189974.
