= Pakuranga United Rugby Club =

Coordinates: 36.908895081°S 174.901843538°E

(New Zealand) Pakuranga United Rugby Club
- Union: Auckland Rugby Football Union
- Founded: 1965
- Location: Pakuranga, Auckland
- Ground: Lloyd Elsmore Park
- President: Mike Biddick
- Captain: Brent Soper
- League: Auckland Premier

Official website
- www.purc.co.nz

Pakuranga United Rugby Club is a rugby union club based in Auckland, New Zealand. The club is affiliated with the Auckland Rugby Football Union.

== History ==
The club was initially established in 1920 as Howick, however, between 1934 and 1945 the club virtually ceased to exist. In 1945 the club was reformed, initially participating in a local competition administered by the Howick District Rugby Football Union, a sub-union of the Auckland Rugby Football Union. In 1956, the club left the Howick sub-union and was admitted as a senior club by the Auckland Rugby Football Union. In 1965 the club was renamed Pakuranga United.

== Present Day ==
Today, Pakuranga fields a range of teams at senior and junior level. The club has had success at senior level in recent years, including winning the Auckland Sevens in 2010 and the Waka Nathan Challenge Cup in 2011. In 2013, the club won its maiden Gallaher Shield title, defeating University in the final. In addition to the primary sport of rugby union, the club is also active in the sports of rugby sevens, touch rugby, netball, Australian Rules, American football and badminton.
