= Morningside, Auckland =

Morningside
- Suburb
- Morningside shops, as seen from the corner of New North Road and Morningside Drive.
- Interactive map of Morningside
- Coordinates: 36.878830°S 174.732731°E
- Country: New Zealand
- City: Auckland
- Local authority: Auckland Council
- Electoral ward: Albert-Eden-Puketāpapa ward
- Local board: Albert-Eden Local Board

Area
  - Land: 109 ha (270 acres)

Population (June 2025)
  - Total: 3,830
  - Density: 3,510/km^{2} (9,100/sq mi)
- Train stations: Morningside railway station

Point Chevalier	Western Springs	Grey Lynn
Mount Albert	Morningside	Kingsland
Mount Albert	St Lukes	Mount Eden

Morningside is a suburb of Auckland, New Zealand. It lies four kilometres south-west of the city centre, close to Eden Park and Western Springs Reserve.

== Geography ==
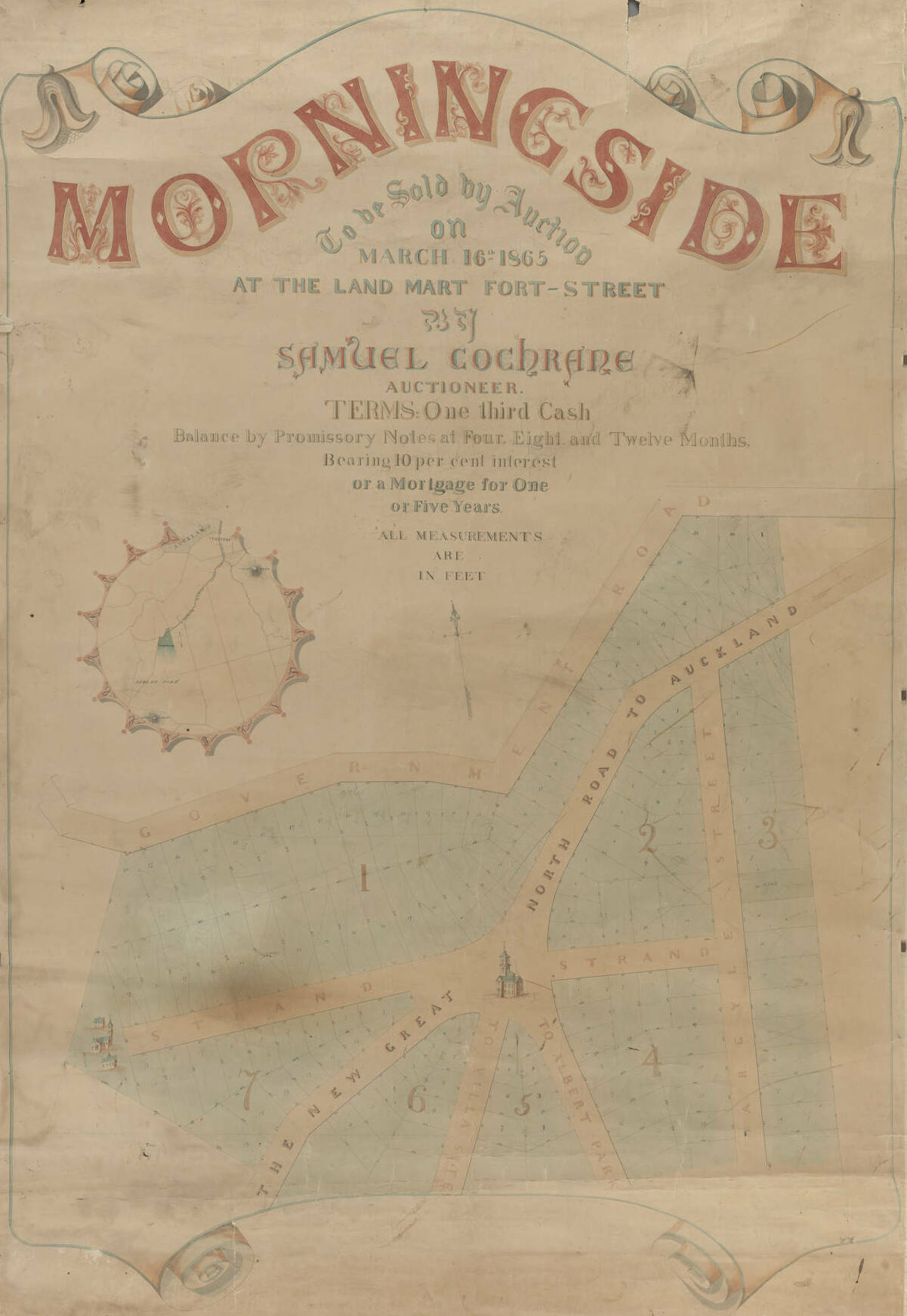
Original 1865 plan for Morningside, including the central church

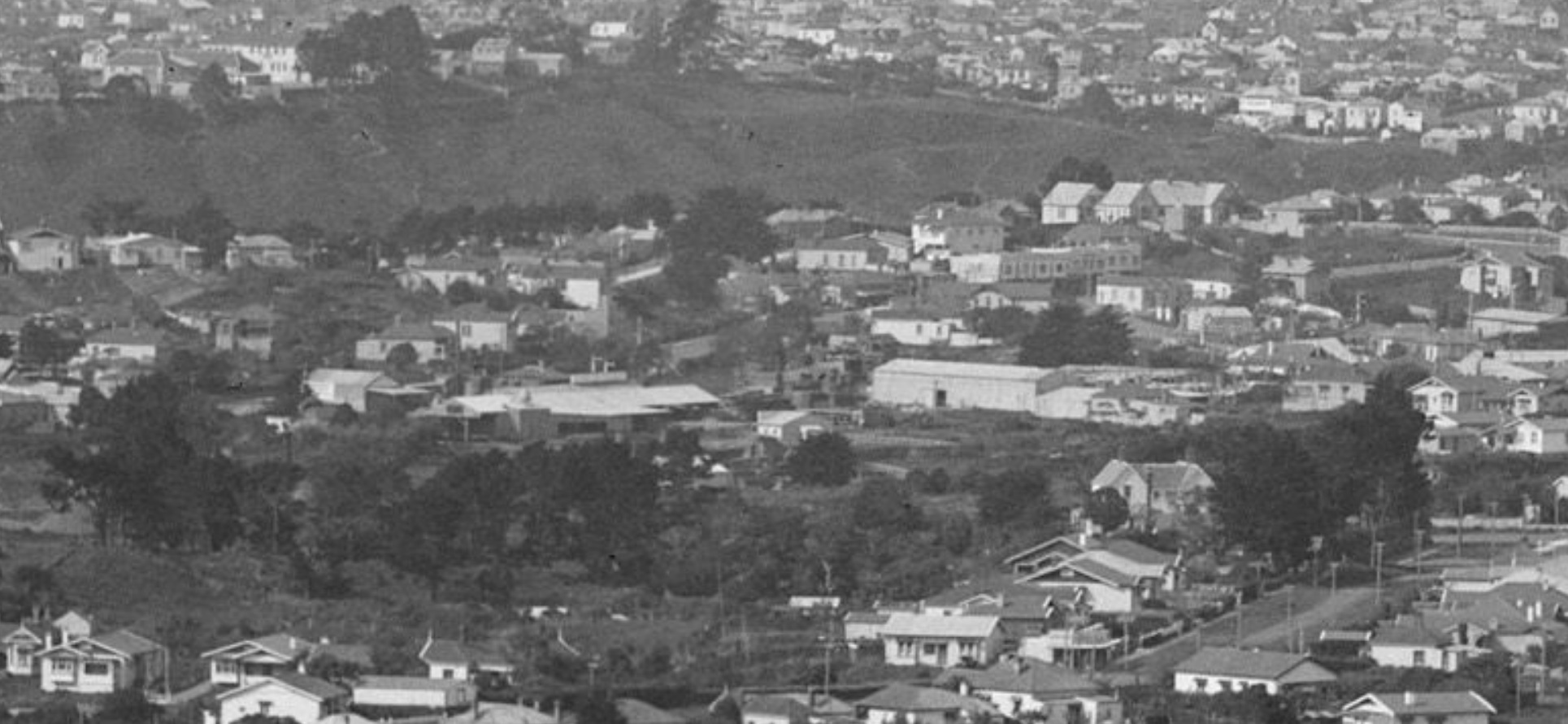
Morningside seen from Ōwairaka / Mount Albert in 1926

Morningside is a suburb on the western Auckland isthmus, located south of the Northwestern Motorway. It is bisected by New North Road and the Western Line. Morningside lies between the suburbs of Grey Lynn, Kingsland, Sandringham, St Lukes, Mount Albert and Point Chevalier.

== History ==
The broader area was originally swampland, and known to Tāmaki Māori as Ngā Anawai, referring to the water-filled lava-flow caves that formed in the area. The lava caves were created by Maungawhau / Mount Eden and Mount Albert over 30,000 years ago.

On 29 June 1841, the Mount Albert area was sold to the Crown by Ngāti Whātua, as a part of a 12,000 acre section. The terrain of the area was rough, meaning the area saw slower development compared to other parts of the Auckland isthmus. In the 1860s, New North Road was established as road access for the area and as an alternative to the Great North Road to the north. Allan Kerr Taylor, a major landowner in the Mount Albert area, auctioned off a section of his land in March 1865 to create a subdivision along the road. Kerr Taylor named the new village Morningside, referencing Morningside in Edinburgh, Scotland, which is the location of the Royal Edinburgh Hospital.Kerr Taylor's original plan for the village included a church to be built on an island in the middle of New North Road.

Morningside railway station opened in March 1880, connecting Morningside to Auckland city by rail. Morningside saw slower growth compared to Kingsland, located closer to the city. In March 1910, the Shawville housing estate in Morningside was sold off.

Morningside grew as a community after the tramline extended to the suburb along New North Road in 1912.

The suburb is centred on the Morningside shops which are located on the New North Road, near the Morningside railway station. One of Morningside's largest buildings is the 1920s brick building which formerly housed the Mount Albert Borough Council until Mt Albert was amalgamated with Auckland City in the late 1980s.

Morningside was the setting of the animated TV show Bro'Town, and also the album title and hometown of Fazerdaze.

== Demographics ==
Morningside covers 1.09 km^{2} (0.42 sq mi) and had an estimated population of 3,830 as of June 2025, with a population density of 3,514 people per km^{2}.

Historical population
Year	Pop.	±% p.a.
2006	3,606	—
2013	3,825	+0.85%
2018	3,981	+0.80%
2023	3,609	−1.94%

Morningside had a population of 3,609 in the 2023 New Zealand census, a decrease of 372 people (−9.3%) since the 2018 census, and a decrease of 216 people (−5.6%) since the 2013 census. There were 1,842 males, 1,743 females and 24 people of other genders in 1,302 dwellings. 8.7% of people identified as LGBTIQ+. The median age was 34.6 years (compared with 38.1 years nationally). There were 456 people (12.6%) aged under 15 years, 924 (25.6%) aged 15 to 29, 1,935 (53.6%) aged 30 to 64, and 291 (8.1%) aged 65 or older.

People could identify as more than one ethnicity. The results were 69.7% European (Pākehā); 10.1% Māori; 11.1% Pasifika; 20.6% Asian; 3.2% Middle Eastern, Latin American and African New Zealanders (MELAA); and 2.2% other, which includes people giving their ethnicity as "New Zealander". English was spoken by 95.6%, Māori language by 2.9%, Samoan by 2.9%, and other languages by 21.4%. No language could be spoken by 2.0% (e.g. too young to talk). New Zealand Sign Language was known by 0.6%. The percentage of people born overseas was 36.0, compared with 28.8% nationally.

Religious affiliations were 23.8% Christian, 4.2% Hindu, 1.7% Islam, 0.3% Māori religious beliefs, 1.7% Buddhist, 0.7% New Age, 0.1% Jewish, and 2.3% other religions. People who answered that they had no religion were 59.9%, and 5.2% of people did not answer the census question.

Of those at least 15 years old, 1,428 (45.3%) people had a bachelor's or higher degree, 1,257 (39.9%) had a post-high school certificate or diploma, and 468 (14.8%) people exclusively held high school qualifications. The median income was $56,100, compared with $41,500 nationally. 657 people (20.8%) earned over $100,000 compared to 12.1% nationally. The employment status of those at least 15 was that 2,013 (63.8%) people were employed full-time, 408 (12.9%) were part-time, and 114 (3.6%) were unemployed.

== Amenities and attractions ==
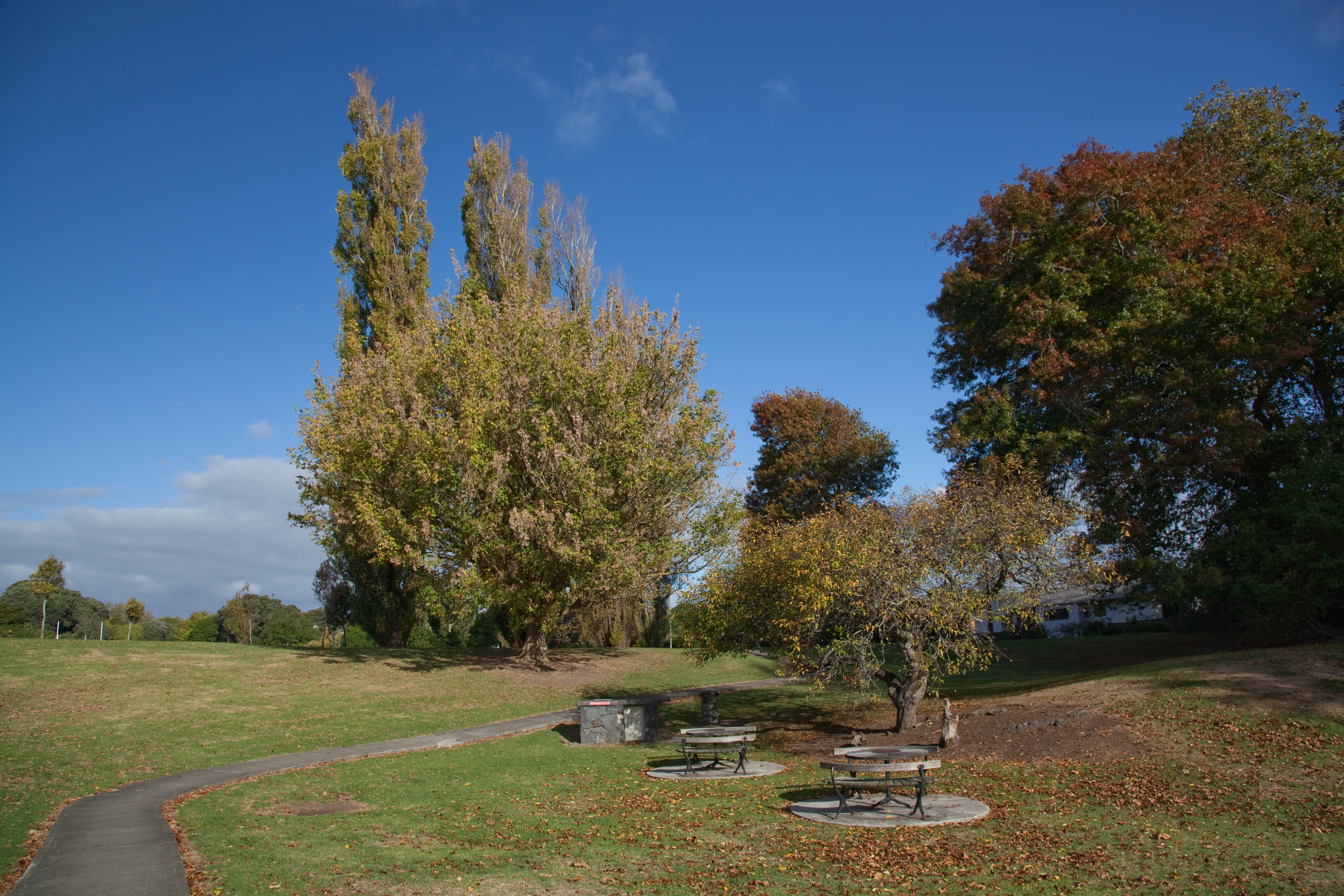
Fowlds Park

- The former Mount Albert Borough Council building
- Fowlds Park, a public park home to the Mount Albert Lions rugby league team and the Auckland Irish Club
- Morningside Church of Christ, which opened as the Wm. Moor Memorial Hall in 1911
- Morningside village, including the Morningside Precinct, a gastronomy hub and venue
- School Reserve, a park and former site of the Mount Albert Primary School from 1871 to 1940.

== Education ==
Mount Albert School is a contributing primary school (years 1–6) with rolls of 513. The local state intermediate school is Kōwhai Intermediate School, while the local secondary schools include Mount Albert Grammar School and Marist College.

== Local government ==
In October 1866, the Mt Albert District Highway Board, the first local government in the area, was formed to administer New North Road and the surrounding areas. In 1911, the board became the Mount Albert Borough, who elected a mayor. In 1978, Mount Albert became a city, and in 1989 it was absorbed into Auckland City. In November 2010, all cities and districts of the Auckland Region were amalgamated into a single body, governed by the Auckland Council.

Morningside is a part of the Albert-Eden local board area. The residents of Albert-Eden elect a local board, and two councillors from the Albert-Eden-Puketāpapa ward to sit on the Auckland Council.

== Bibliography ==
- Dunsford, Deborah (2016). Mt Albert Then and Now: a History of Mt Albert, Morningside, Kingsland, St Lukes, Sandringham and Owairaka. Auckland: Mount Albert Historical Society. ISBN 978-0-473-36016-0. OCLC 964695277. Wikidata Q117189974.
- The Heart of Colonial Auckland 1865-1910, Terence Hodgson. Random Century 1992.
