= Ponsonby RFC =

NZ rugby union club, based in Auckland

Coordinates: 36°51′54″S 174°43′33″E

(New Zealand) Ponsonby District Rugby Football Club
- Union: Auckland Rugby Football Union
- Founded: 1874; 151 years ago
- Location: Ponsonby, Auckland
- Ground: Western Springs Stadium
- Chairman: Chris Clews
- President: John Tetini
- Director of Rugby: Peter Leulusoo
- League: Auckland Premier

Official website
- www.ponsonbyrugby.co.nz

Ponsonby District Rugby Football Club is a rugby union club based in Auckland, New Zealand. The club was established in 1874 and is affiliated with the Auckland Rugby Football Union. Ponsonby is the oldest extant member of the Auckland union, and the second oldest club in the Auckland region, after North Shore, who are now affiliated with the North Harbour Rugby Union.

The men's premier team have won the Auckland Premier competition a record 45 times, including 33 times since the introduction of the Gallaher Shield, itself named after Ponsonby stalwart Dave Gallaher. Ponsonby have dominated the Auckland competition in recent years, having been champions on eight consecutive occasions between 2004 and 2011. The club has produced numerous All Blacks, the most recent being Rieko Ioane.

== Honours ==
Auckland Championship/Gallaher Shield (46): 1883, 1884, 1885, 1887, 1890, 1891†, 1897, 1908, 1909, 1910, 1913, 1924, 1925, 1926, 1927, 1929, 1930, 1933‡, 1936, 1937, 1938, 1948, 1954, 1976, 1978, 1979, 1981, 1983, 1985, 1986, 1988, 1990, 1993, 1995, 2001, 2002, 2004, 2005, 2006, 2007, 2008, 2009, 2010, 2011, 2018, 2019, 2024, 2025

- Notes: † – Shared with Parnell.
- Notes: ‡ – Shared with Marist and University.

== See also ==
- Category:Ponsonby RFC players
