= Bharatiya Mandir Hindu Temple =

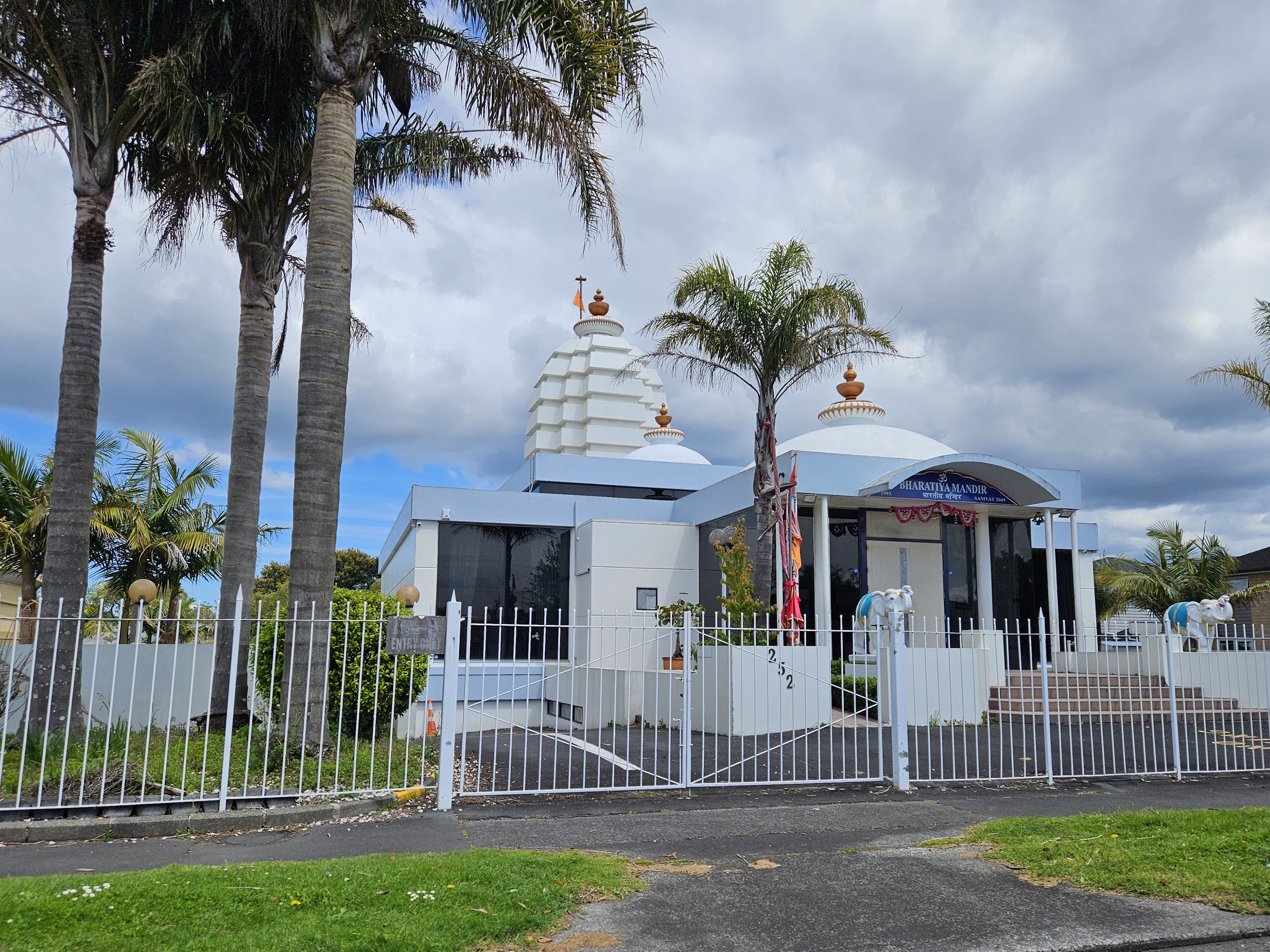

Religion
- Affiliation: Hinduism

Location
- Country: New Zealand
- Interactive map of Bharatiya Mandir Hindu Temple
- Coordinates: 36.8862°S 174.7415°E

Architecture
- Completed: June 1993

Website
- https://bharatiyamandir.org.nz/

Bharatiya Mandir is a Hindu temple in the Auckland suburb of Sandringham. It is the oldest and first purpose-built temple in New Zealand and officially opened in June 1993.

Bharatiya Mandir is a significant cultural landscape for Auckland's Hindu community and Hindu Indian diaspora. It is a site which hosts religious festivities such as Diwali.

== History ==
In 1986, now philanthropist and member of the New Zealand Order of Merit, Roshanlal Nauhria and a group of Hindu New Zealanders made plans to build a Hindu temple to accommodate for Auckland's growing Hindu population. On 29 October 1988, the temple site was blessed by Sant Shri Morari Bapu, during a visit to New Zealand from India. On 1 September 1991 a land purification ceremony (Bhoomi Puja) was carried out by Acharya Shri Vasantbhau Kantilal Shukla and was witnessed by around 600 devotees. With donations from around 51 families, the foundational bricks of the temple were laid. This followed with a foundation ceremony (Shila Ropan). A time capsule was also established and put in place on 20 September 1991.

The first group of trustees of the Bharatiya Mandir were, Shri Shivlal Master, Dr. Chunibhai Madhav, Roshanlal Nauhria, Thakor Parbhu, Kantilal Bhikha, Dr. Rajinder Agnihotri, Dr. Kantilal N. Patel, Mohanbhai Daya, Narendra Masters and Navin Chandra Patel. Committee members were chosen to travel to India, along with architect Peter Tibbitts (from Stiffe Hooker and Associates), to study other mandir temples and select Murti and other authentic Hindu religious objects for use at Bharatiya Mandir.

== Current ==
In November 2016 Bharatiya Mandir purchased the neighbouring Balmoral Community Centre which hosts local community groups and events. The temple is located in the suburb of Sandringham, known for its South Asian influence and dubbed 'Little India' due to its extensive range of South Asian shops and eateries.

The Bharatiya Mandir now organises events for the community of devotees such as youth groups, education classes library services, music classes, yoga classes, various language classes, traditional dance classes and a women's group. Festivals are celebrated such as Lohri Celebrations, Makarsankranti, Vasant Panchami/ Saraswati Puja, Maha Shivratri, Holika Dahan, Holi, Chaitra Navaratri/Ugadi Celebrations, Ram Navmi, Hanuman Jayanti, Guru Purnima, Raksha Bandhan, Krishna Janmashtami, Ganesha Chaturthi, Ganesha Visarjan, Sharadiya Navaratri, Maha Navmi, Sharad Purnima, Dussehra, Karwa Chauth, Dhan Teras, Narak Chaturdashi, Lakshmi Puja/Diwali, Govardhan Puja, Bhai Dooj and Geeta Jayanti.

In 2023 the temple celebrated its 30 year jubilee.
