= Bruce McLeod (rugby union) =

Rugby player (1940–1996)

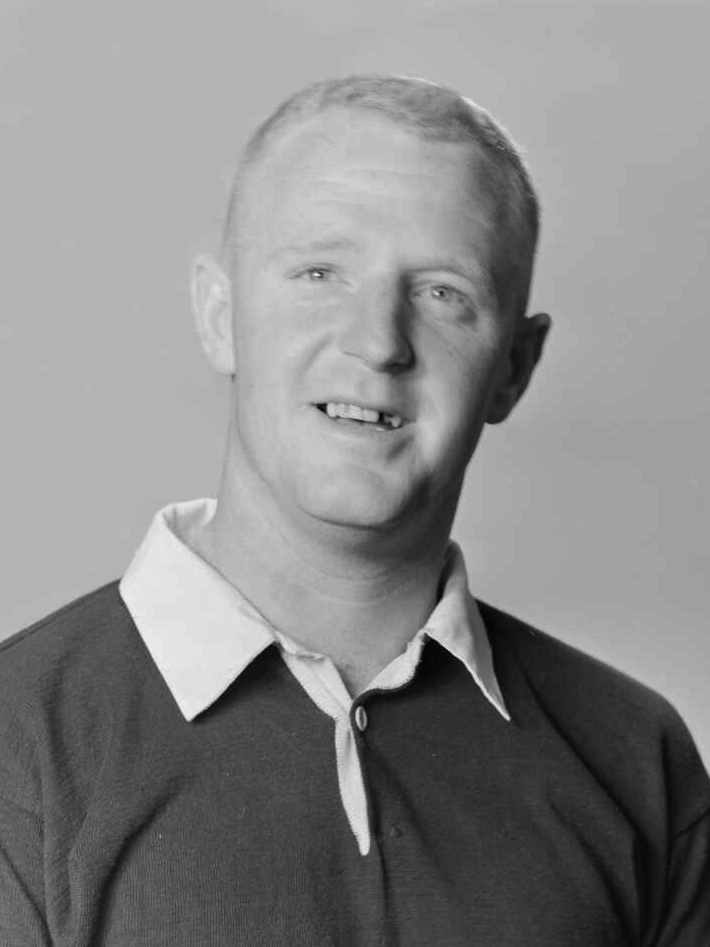
- McLeod in 1963
- Born: Bruce Edward McLeod; 30 January 1940 Auckland, New Zealand
- Died: 1 May 1996 (aged 56) Foxton Beach, New Zealand
- Height: 1.80 m (5 ft 11 in)
- Weight: 91 kg (201 lb)
- School: Otahuhu College

Rugby union career
- Position: Hooker
Amateur team(s)
Years	Team	Apps	(Points)
- Manurewa Rugby Club
Provincial / State sides
Years	Team	Apps	(Points)
1962–70	Counties		
1971	Hawke's Bay		
International career
Years	Team	Apps	(Points)
1964–70	New Zealand	24	(12)

Bruce Edward McLeod (30 January 1940 – 1 May 1996) was a New Zealand rugby union player. A hooker, McLeod represented Counties at a provincial level, and was a member of the New Zealand national side, the All Blacks, from 1964 to 1970. He played 46 matches for the All Blacks including 24 internationals.
