= Marist Brothers Old Boys RFC =

New Zealand rugby union club

Coordinates: 36.89636766°S 174.868111°E

(New Zealand) Marist Brothers Old Boys Rugby Football Club
- Union: Auckland Rugby Union
- Nickname: Mighty Marist
- Founded: 1908
- Location: Panmure, Auckland
- Ground: Mount Wellington War Memorial Reserve
- President: Kevin Nepia
- League: Auckland Premier

Official website
- www.aucklandmarist.co.nz/marist-brothers

Marist Brothers Old Boys Rugby Football Club is a rugby union club based in Auckland, New Zealand. The club was established in 1908 and is affiliated with the Auckland Rugby Football Union and New Zealand Marist Rugby Federation. Along with clubs like Grammar and University, Sacred Heart Old Boys, the predecessor of Marist, participated in an "Old Boys" competition until 1908, when the Auckland RFU scrapped the "district" scheme which had been in place from 1891. Consequently, Marist was formed, first fielding a premier team in 1910. The club have gone on to become one of the most successful clubs in Auckland, winning the Auckland competition on 11 occasions. Marist have produced numerous Auckland and New Zealand representatives, the latter including Sir John Kirwan, Robin Brooke, Zinzan Brooke, and more recently Isaia Toeava and Francis Saili.

== Honours ==
Auckland Club Championship (11): 1912, 1915, 1923, 1933*, 1939, 1947, 1950, 1989, 1991, 1994, 1996

- *Shared with Ponsonby and University
