= Grammar Carlton RFC =

(New Zealand) Grammar Carlton Rugby Football Club
- Union: Auckland Rugby Football Union
- Nickname(s): GC
- Founded: 1996; 29 years ago
- Location: Epsom, Auckland
- Ground(s): Cornwall Park
- League(s): Auckland Premier

Official website
- www.grammarcarlton.co.nz/grammar-carlton-rugby-football-club/

Grammar Carlton Rugby Football Club was a rugby union club based in Auckland, New Zealand. The club was established in 1996 as a merger between the Grammar Old Boys and Carlton clubs. The club was affiliated with the Auckland Rugby Football Union. In 2013, Grammar Carlton merged with Teachers Eastern to form Grammar TEC.

== History ==
Grammar Carlton was formed in 1996, as a merger between Grammar Old Boys (established in 1914) and Carlton (established in 1982, as a merger between Cornwall and Grafton, who were themselves established in 1922 and 1874, respectively). The club are based at Cornwall Park, which was the home of Carlton prior to the 1996, and Cornwall prior to 1982. The premier team won its first and only Gallaher Shield in 2012, defeating Marist in the final by 30 - 9.
