= Ronald Dobson (rugby union) =

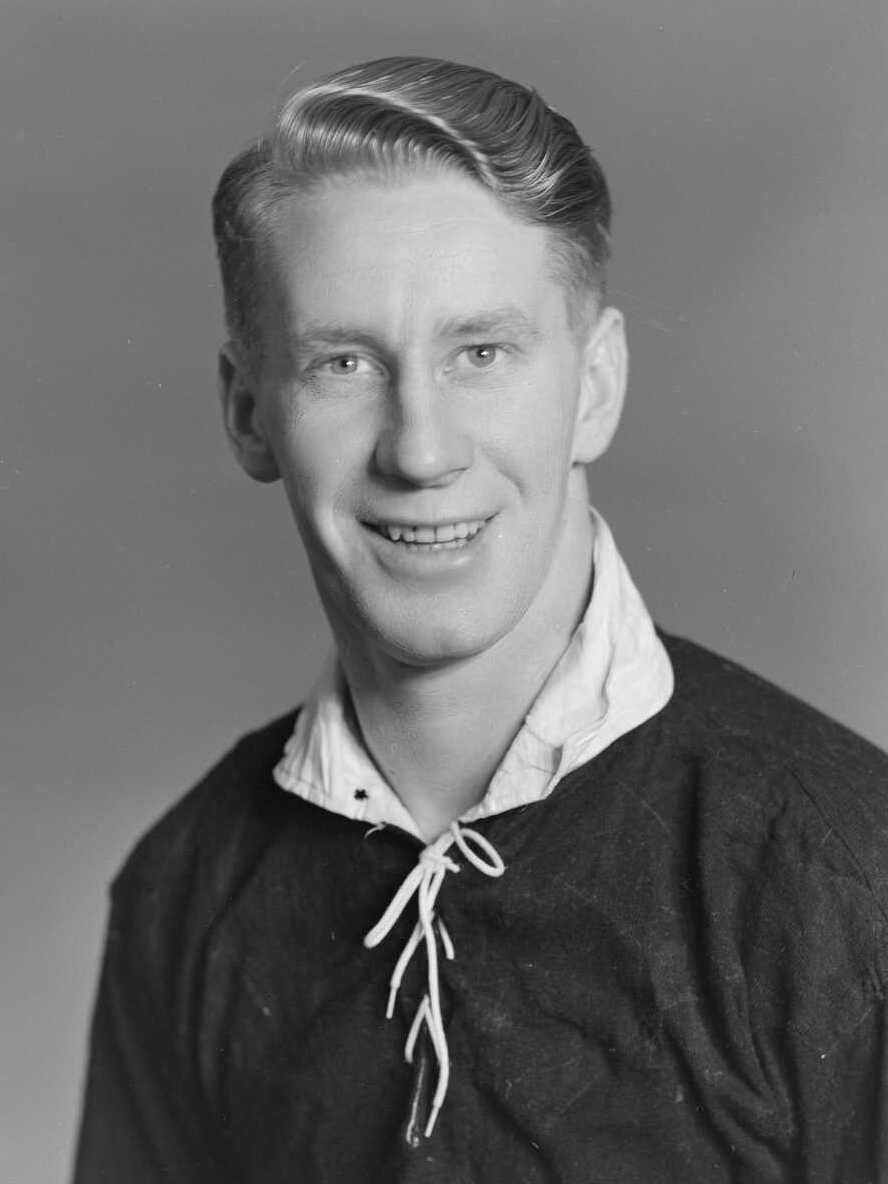
- Dobson in 1949
- Born: Ronald Leslie Dobson; 26 March 1923 Auckland, New Zealand
- Died: 26 October 1994 (aged 71) Auckland, New Zealand
- Height: 1.80 m (5 ft 11 in)
- Weight: 74 kg (163 lb)

Rugby union career
- Position: Second five-eighth
Provincial / State sides
Years	Team	Apps	(Points)
1946–49	Auckland	28	
International career
Years	Team	Apps	(Points)
1949	New Zealand	1	(0)

Ronald Leslie Dobson (26 March 1923 – 26 October 1994) was a New Zealand rugby union player. A second five-eighth, Dobson represented Auckland at a provincial level. He played one match for the New Zealand national side, the All Blacks, a test against the touring Australian team in 1949.

Dobson served as a gunner with the New Zealand Artillery, 2nd NZEF, during World War II, embarking for Britain in early 1944. Following the end of the war, he played for the New Zealand Army rugby team, known as the "Kiwis", appearing in 18 matches and scoring eight tries.
