= Kingsland, New Zealand =

Kingsland
- Suburb
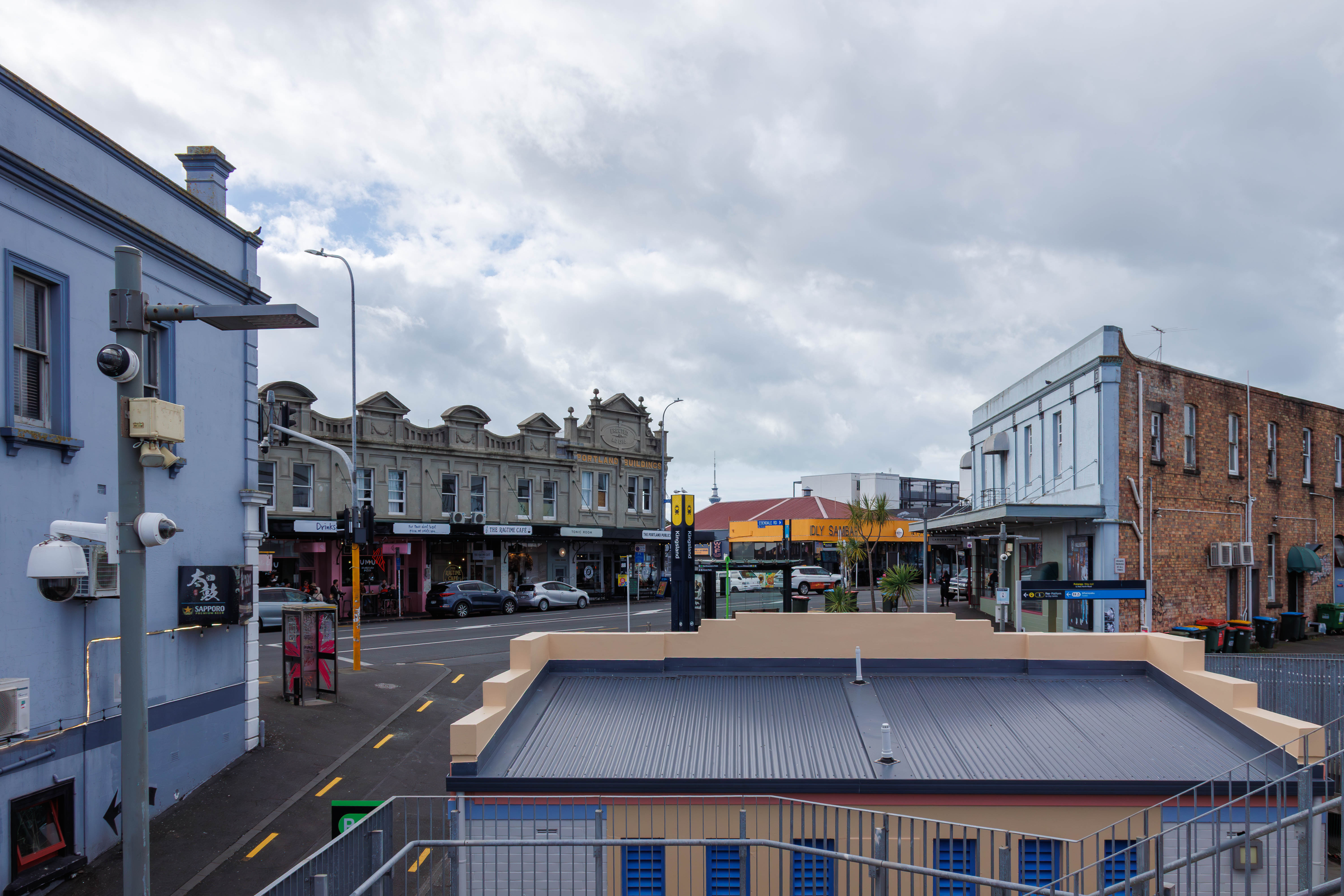
- Interactive map of Kingsland
- Coordinates: 36.872°S 174.745°E
- Country: New Zealand
- City: Auckland
- Local authority: Auckland Council
- Electoral ward: Albert-Eden-Puketāpapa ward
- Local board: Albert-Eden Local Board
- Established: 1880s

Area
  - Land: 77 ha (190 acres)

Population (June 2025)
  - Total: 3,290
  - Density: 4,300/km^{2} (11,000/sq mi)
- Train stations: Kingsland railway station

Grey Lynn	Grey Lynn	Eden Terrace
Morningside	Kingsland	Eden Terrace
Morningside	Mount Eden	Mount Eden

Kingsland is an inner-city suburb of Auckland, the largest and most populous urban area in New Zealand. Kingsland is under the local governance of the Auckland Council. It is the home of Eden Park, New Zealand's largest stadium, which hosted the finals for the 2011 Rugby World Cup. Kingsland has a village centre that contains a series of shops, restaurants, pubs and monthly markets.

Kingsland was established in the 1880s with the sale of allotments; the buildings predominantly date from the Edwardian and the interwar periods.New North Road is the main thoroughfare in Kingsland, running northeast–southwest from the Auckland Central Business District (CBD), with the suburb running along the ridge line. Kingsland's main street is located on New North Road next to the Kingsland railway station and directly across from Eden Park.

== History ==
Plan of Kingsland, New North Road, for sale by auction on Monday 30 March 1885

Kingsland cricket ground in flood in 1907 (present-day location of Eden Park)

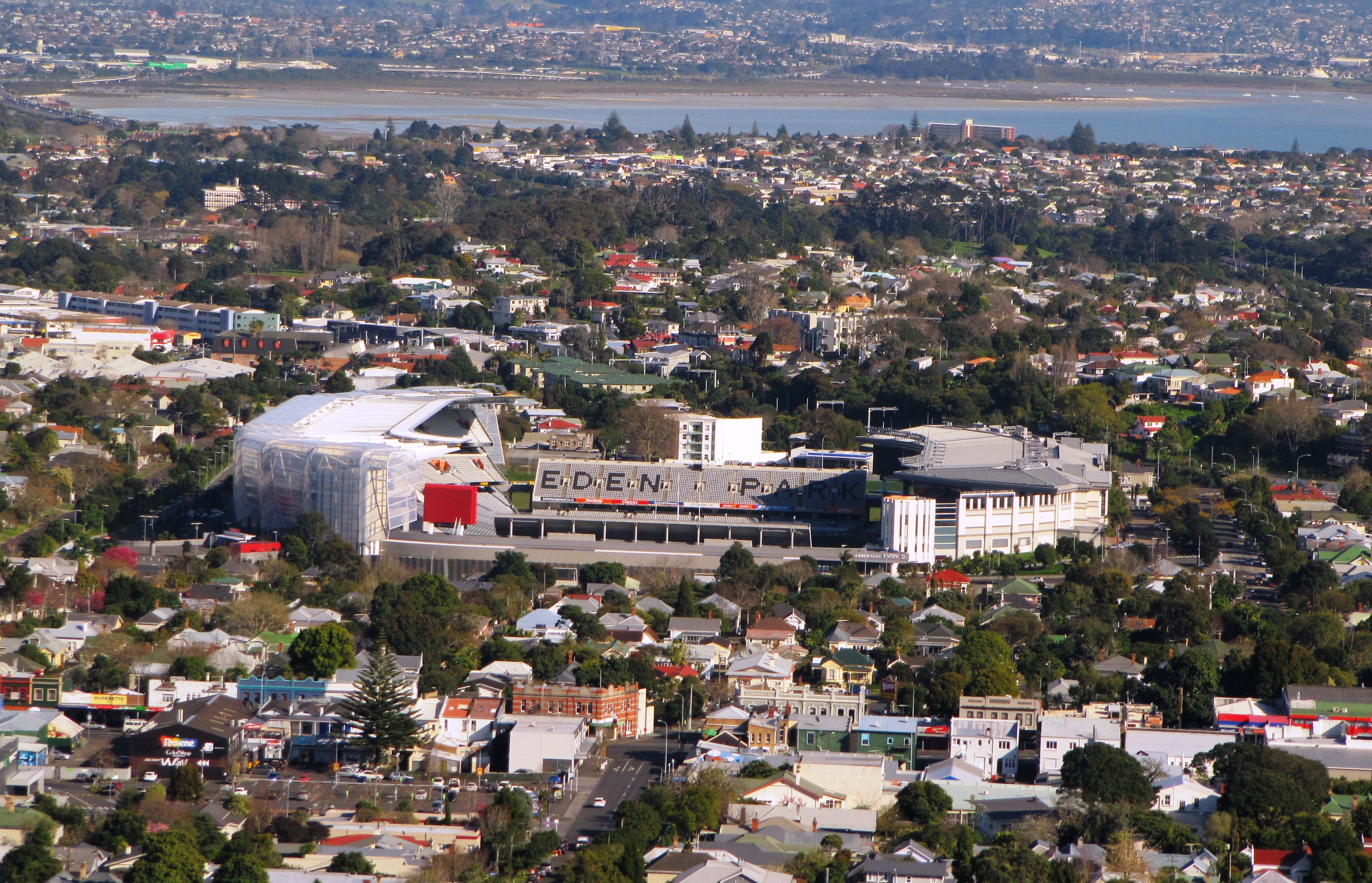
Eden Park Stadium as seen from the summit of Mount Eden.

=== Prehistory ===
Much of the Kingsland area was originally swampland, and known to Tāmaki Māori as Ngā Anawai, referring to the water-filled lava-flow caves that formed in the area. The lava caves were created by Maungawhau / Mount Eden and Mount Albert over 30,000 years ago.

=== 19th century ===
The origins of Kingsland are linked to the European settlement of Auckland. In 1835, Thomas Mitchell, a Sydney trader, purchased land from Āpihai Te Kawau, rangatira (chief) of the local Māori tribe, Ngāti Whātua, for £160, in a transaction which the Lands Claim Commission later disallowed. In 1841, Te Kawau gifted 3,000 acres (1,200 ha) to the colonial government and Auckland began to take shape as a city. Land continued to be bought and sold, and in 1852 John McElwain purchased 55 acres (22 ha) for the purpose of farming and received the adjoining 60 acres (24 ha) from his brother George in what is present-day Kingsland. Cabbage Tree Swamp Road was one of the original streets in the area, but the settlers of Mt Albert, Morningside and Kingsland appealed for a change of name, and it became Kingsland Road in 1877.

The terrain of the area was rough, meaning the area saw slower development compared to other parts of the Auckland isthmus. In the 1860s, New North Road was established as road access for the area and as an alternative to the Great North Road to the north. In October 1866, the Mt Albert District Highway Board, the first local government in the area, was formed to administer New North Road and surrounding areas. A tollbooth in modern-day Kingsland was established on the corner of New North Road and Cabbage Tree Swamp Road (modern-day Sandringham Road), which operated from 1875 until 1888.

Kingsland railway station opened on 29 March 1880, spurring suburban growth in the area. The city of Auckland experienced significant growth in population in the latter 19th century, putting pressure on the areas closest to the city. That population growth combined with the establishment of rail and bus connections into the city by the early 1880s created excellent conditions for John McElwain to subdivide his farm. In 1882, 227 allotments were laid out. Kingsland Avenue — along with First, Second, Third and Fourth Avenues — provided road access to the properties. Prices for sections in the subdivision ranged from £28 to £100. In addition to McElwain's Kingsland Estate, other suburban housing estates developed in the Kingsland area, including the Randersvyl Estate and Roganville.

=== 20th century ===
A second wave of growth occurred in the early 1900s, then the Auckland tramline reached Kingsland in 1903. The community was centred around Arthur W. Page's general store on New North Road, which was soon joined by multiple new shops. New housing estates including Hirstleigh, Leith Hall and Melvia subdivided more land around Kingsland into suburban homes, and by the 1910s ingsland had developed into a working class commuter suburb of Auckland.

A. W. Page and his brother, builder Charles H. Page, extended his store in 1913 and 1914, and constructed the Portland Building. A new post office was built in Kingsland in 1912, joined by St George's Anglican Church in 1913 and a cinema, the Theatre Royal, in 1915. Eden Park became a major sporting venue for cricket and rugby in the 1910s and 1920s, but was plagued by regular drainage issues.

In 1938, 84 residents of Kingsland launched an unsuccessful petition to change the suburb's name to Beverly Hills, citing the poor reputation of the name Kingsland.

The Kingsland commercial village flourished in the 1950s and 1960s, and by the 1970s the suburb had becoming a centre for Urban Māori and Pasifika communities, due to the gentrification of the inner city suburbs close to the Auckland city centre. During this period, Kingsland became one of the densest populated suburbs in Auckland, known for overcrowded houses in disrepair. The Northwestern Motorway was cut through in the 1970s, severing the cross streets that linked Kingsland to Surrey Crescent and Arch Hill, leaving Bond St as the sole direct connection to these suburbs. In 1997, Kog Transmissions, a large recording studio and independent label for New Zealand musicians, was established in the suburb. Musicians including Concord Dawn, P-Money and Pitch Black recorded material here, until the studio moved to a new premises in 2010.

=== 21st century ===
Kingsland underwent major urban revitalisation in the early 2000s and again in the early 2010s, when Eden Park and the Kingsland railway station were upgraded for the 2011 Rugby World Cup.

== Demographics ==
The statistical area of Kingsland, which includes part of Eden Terrace, covers 0.77 km^{2} (0.30 sq mi) and had an estimated population of 3,290 as of June 2025, with a population density of 4,273 people per km^{2}.

Historical population
Year	Pop.	±% p.a.
2006	2,967	—
2013	3,216	+1.16%
2018	3,372	+0.95%
2023	3,162	−1.28%

Kingsland had a population of 3,162 in the 2023 New Zealand census, a decrease of 210 people (−6.2%) since the 2018 census, and a decrease of 54 people (−1.7%) since the 2013 census. There were 1,524 males, 1,596 females and 42 people of other genders in 1,182 dwellings. 12.0% of people identified as LGBTIQ+. The median age was 32.8 years (compared with 38.1 years nationally). There were 381 people (12.0%) aged under 15 years, 960 (30.4%) aged 15 to 29, 1,638 (51.8%) aged 30 to 64, and 186 (5.9%) aged 65 or older.

People could identify as more than one ethnicity. The results were 77.1% European (Pākehā); 12.8% Māori; 12.4% Pasifika; 11.6% Asian; 3.2% Middle Eastern, Latin American and African New Zealanders (MELAA); and 1.1% other, which includes people giving their ethnicity as "New Zealander". English was spoken by 96.7%, Māori language by 3.2%, Samoan by 2.2%, and other languages by 16.8%. No language could be spoken by 2.0% (e.g. too young to talk). New Zealand Sign Language was known by 0.4%. The percentage of people born overseas was 29.4, compared with 28.8% nationally.

Religious affiliations were 20.5% Christian, 1.6% Hindu, 1.0% Islam, 0.3% Māori religious beliefs, 1.2% Buddhist, 0.7% New Age, 0.2% Jewish, and 2.4% other religions. People who answered that they had no religion were 66.6%, and 5.5% of people did not answer the census question.

Of those at least 15 years old, 1,416 (50.9%) people had a bachelor's or higher degree, 1,029 (37.0%) had a post-high school certificate or diploma, and 336 (12.1%) people exclusively held high school qualifications. The median income was $60,400, compared with $41,500 nationally. 696 people (25.0%) earned over $100,000 compared to 12.1% nationally. The employment status of those at least 15 was that 1,872 (67.3%) people were employed full-time, 360 (12.9%) were part-time, and 93 (3.3%) were unemployed.

== Politics ==
In October 1866, the Mt Albert District Highway Board, the first local government in the area, was formed to administer New North Road and the surrounding areas. In 1911, the board became the Mount Albert Borough, who elected a mayor. In 1978, Mount Albert became a city, and in 1989 it was absorbed into Auckland City. In November 2010, all cities and districts of the Auckland Region were amalgamated into a single body, governed by the Auckland Council.

Kingsland is a part of the Albert-Eden local board area. The residents of Albert-Eden elect a local board, and two councillors from the Albert-Eden-Puketāpapa ward to sit on the Auckland Council.

== Landmarks and features ==
=== Eden Park ===
Eden Park is New Zealand's largest stadium with a capacity of 50,000 seats. Every year it hosts almost half a million local and international sports fans and patrons who attend matches and functions at the park.

The park underwent a $240 million, three-year redevelopment prior to the 2011 Rugby World Cup. Including a temporary expansion to 60,000 seats and the addition of four giant Māori carvings at each of the four main public entrances. The carvings represent Tāne-mahuta, the spirit of the forest; Rongo, the god of peace; Tūmatauenga, the god of war; and Tāwhirimātea, the god of wind. The carvings were designed by Ngāti Whātua carver, Arekatera Maihi.

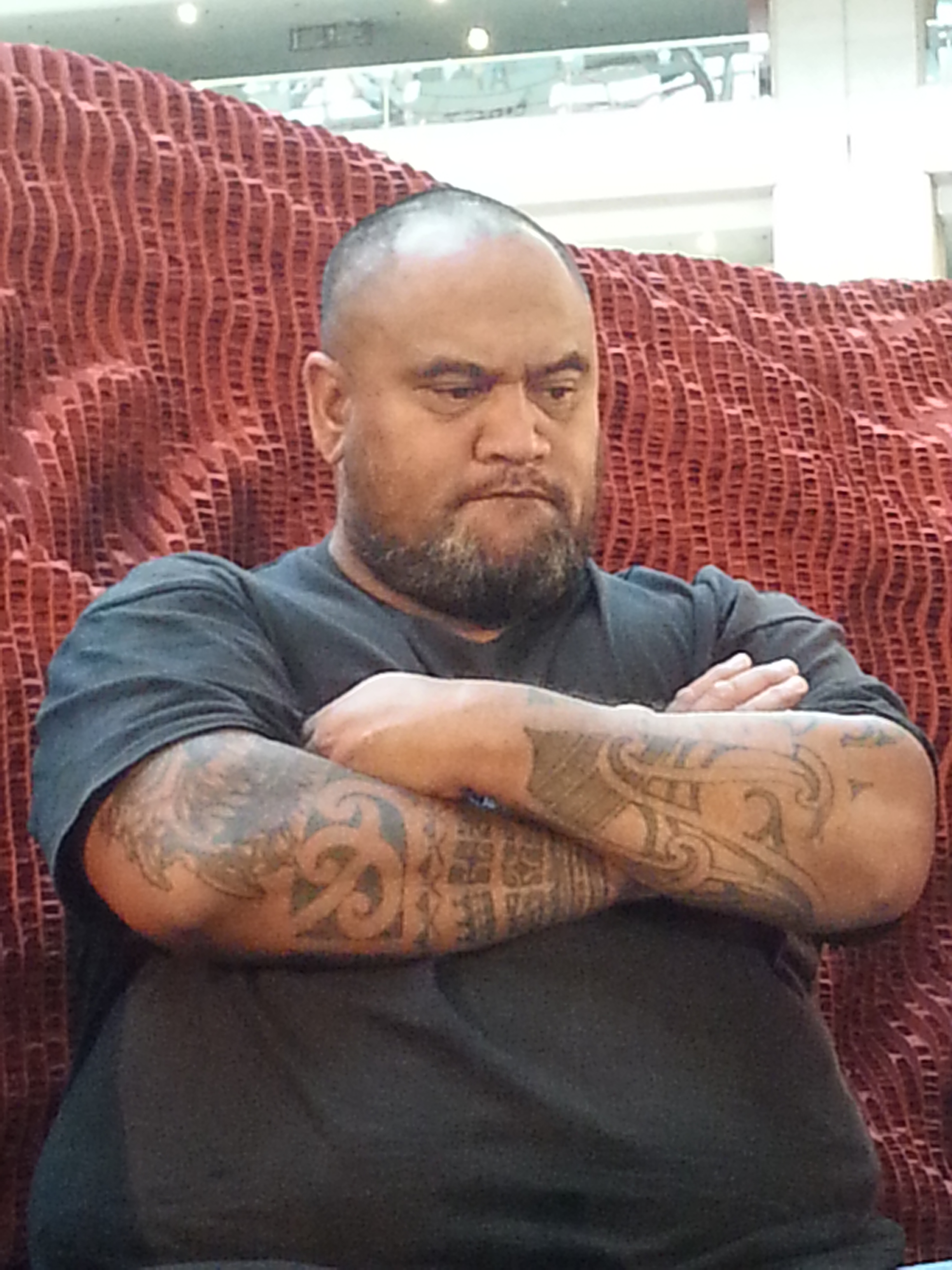
Arekatera Maihi at Taipei Book Exhibit, Feb 2015

Eden Park was located at the low point of Cabbage Tree Swamp, with the road running on a causeway across it. Eden Park has been used as a sports ground since 1900, and by 1914 the ground was drained and turned into two ovals for cricket. Eden Park has been the home of Auckland Cricket since 1910 and Auckland Rugby since 1925. Its 100-year history boasts some of New Zealand's proudest sporting moments, including the 1950 Empire Games, the inaugural 1987 Rugby World Cup, and the 1992 Cricket World Cup. Since the early 1900s it has hosted major rugby and cricket matches, and is now a regular host of the Bledisloe Cup, ITM Cup, and the Super Rugby games. Most recently, Eden Park hosted the finals for the 2011 Rugby World Cup and it has been named the co-host for 2015 Cricket World Cup.

=== Notable buildings ===
Many of Kingsland's older buildings have survived by adapting to contemporary uses.

- Shooters Bar (330 New North Road) — The original building was built in the 1910-1920's area, as two independent buildings which later were joined. Over the course of its usage it has been an established shoe shop, an office building and a function venue. It is located in prime position located next to the old kiwi bacon factory, today Fairfax media. The buildings, in most recent years has been home to one of Auckland's more unique function venues and has had major modifications including a large deck with a retractable roof. The heritage and significance of the building has been maintained and renovated alike, though through the years it has survived by adapting to multiple usages, with an attempt being made, fortunately, to maintain the historical significance of the building and keep its presence today.
- Trinity Methodist Church & Jubilee Hall (400 New North Road) — The existing timber church was built in 1897 and the Jubilee Hall replaced an old timber church on the Sunday School site in 1909. The church has memorial windows commemorating local men who died in the First and Second World Wars.
- Windsor Dairy Buildings (434–442 New North Road) — Built as two separate buildings between 1900 and 1910, a unifying facade was applied in 1940.
- Public Amenity Building (448 New North Road) — Built in 1928 the Kingsland public toilets are a fine example of Art Deco style. The public toilets and a pedestrian overbridge were constructed after several fatalities at the station.
- Pages Buildings and Grain Store (460–470 New North Road) — The first Pages Stores were built in the late 1880s. Handy to the rail and later a major tram stop, these businesses provided goods, grain and fodder to local farmers. The Grain Store buildings date from 1900 to 1914.
- Kingsland Post Office (478 New North Road) — Described as a typical government architect suburban Post Office type, this 1911 building blends Edwardian Classical Revival style and Arts and Crafts elements and was designed by architect John Campbell. The Post Office remained in use until 1989.
- Theatre Royal (486 New North Road) — Built in 1915, the Theatre Royal was one of a number of new suburban theatres built around Auckland at a similar time to serve the entertainment needs of the fast-growing area around Kingsland. It closed as a cinema in 1978 and was refurbished in 1996 for its present use as a retail establishment.
- Kingsland Fire Station (516 New North Road) — Now privately owned, the Fire Station was built in 1933 in a Georgian Revival style, replacing an original timber station with a watch tower built in 1906. The building was later repurposed for residential purpose and renovated for season 8 of The Block NZ.
- Mrs R Scott, Draper (477 New North Road) — Built in the early 1890s, the building was occupied by Mrs Rachael Scott, a draper, from around 1901 up until 1925–26. In 1970, the Kingsland Drapery Ltd was still operating from the building. By 1985 was being used a food business and it is now a restaurant- Canton Café.
- Portland Buildings (463–475 New North Road) — The Portland Buildings were constructed in 1914 on an empty site defining the corner of Central Road. Built for Arthur Page, it is named after the ship that brought the Page family to New Zealand.

=== Street art ===
- NETCH Street Art — Located on the corner New North Rd and Morningside Drive, it was created by the artists Stray, Vent, Askew, Shake, Misery and Berst over a period of three weeks in September 2009.
- Kingsland Light Show — Every Thursday night during the Rugby World Cup 2011, the old, distinctive Post Office in Kingsland came to life an hour after sunset with a building projection light show of Kiwiana images and scenes from Kingsland's past and present.

== Local culture ==
=== Events and markets ===
- Vintage and Craft Markets — Kingsland is the host to several popular craft and vintage markets that occur on a monthly basis.
- Kingsland Festival — This annual autumn festival is organised by the Kingsland Business Society and the neighbourhood of Kingsland. The festival involves a kids' zone, a craft market, street performers, and nightly entertainment.

=== Local personalities ===
Herbs — a Pacific reggae band that formed in 1979 and produced a stream of reggae hits and 10 top-20 hits in the early 1990s. Herbs call Ponsonby their home, but their base of operations was set in Kingsland.

John McElwain — Kingsland's first land developer, was born in County Louth, Ireland in 1821 and died in Auckland at the age of 95 in 1916. Impatient to see the hill-climb to his property reduced in grade, he subdivided in 1882. Later work by the Highway Board improved New North Road by cutting down three feet from McElwain's Hill between Kingsland and Morningside.

== Transportation ==
Public transportation extended from the inner city to the surrounding areas in the late 1870s and early 1880s with horse-drawn buses being the first mode of regular public transportation in the late 1870s. In 1880, the long-awaited railway came, connecting Newmarket with Helensville with stops in Mt Eden, Kingsland, Morningside and Mt Albert. At the beginning of the 20th century, trams began connecting Mt Eden, Balmoral, Kingsland and Mt Albert with the city. The trams ran for the last time in the 1950s.

Kingsland is well-served by trains and buses, and is only 5 km from Auckland's CBD. The train station is right in the heart of Kingsland village, and trains run regularly into the city and the western suburbs beyond.

The centre of the shopping and business activities in Kingsland is New North Road. By vehicle Kingsland can be accessed from the North Western Motorway (SH16) by taking the St Lukes off-ramp or from the CBD via Bond Street and Great North Road.

== Education ==
Kōwhai Intermediate School is a coeducational intermediate (years 7–8) school with a roll of 553 as of July 2026. The local secondary schools are Mount Albert Grammar School, Marist College and St Peter's College.

== Bibliography ==
- Dunsford, Deborah (2016). Mt Albert Then and Now: a History of Mt Albert, Morningside, Kingsland, St Lukes, Sandringham and Owairaka. Auckland: Mount Albert Historical Society. ISBN 978-0-473-36016-0. OCLC 964695277. Wikidata Q117189974.
