= Frank McMullen =

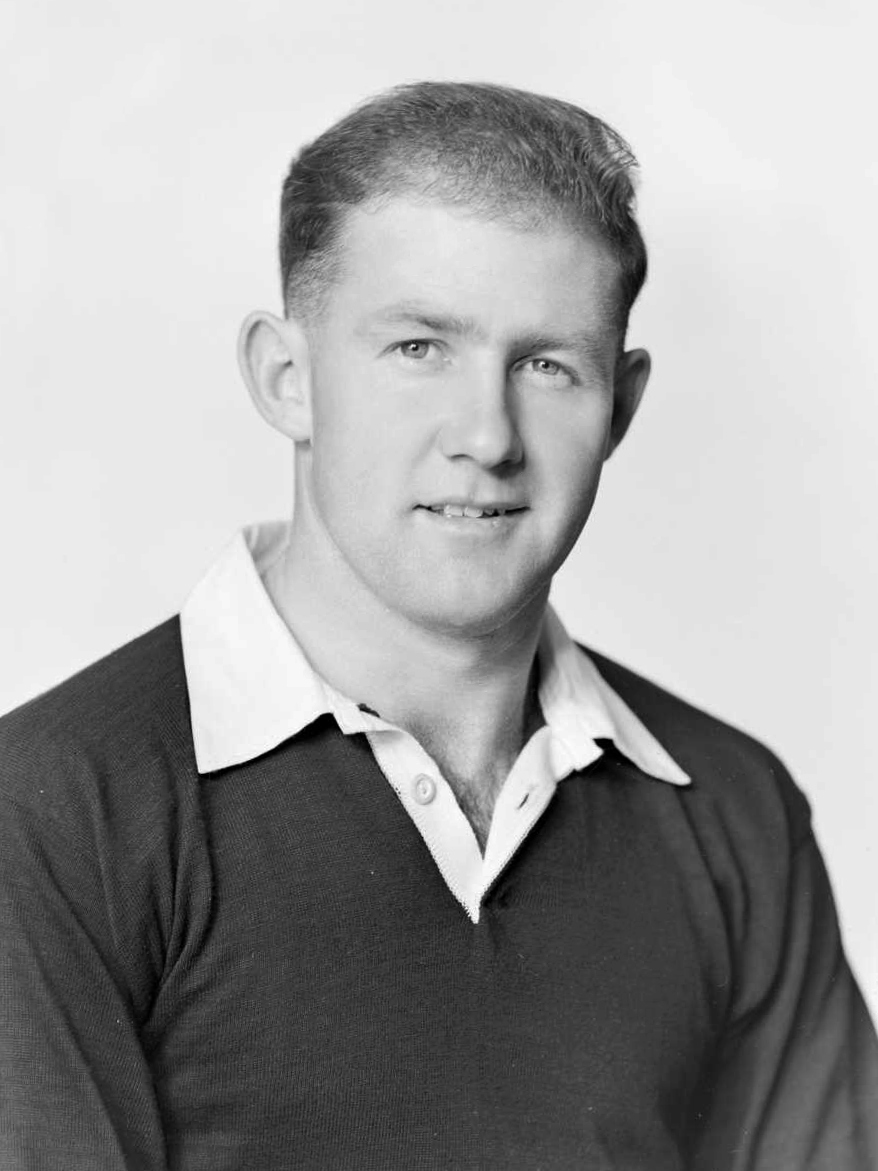
- McMullen in 1956
- Born: Raymond Frank McMullen; 18 January 1933 Auckland, New Zealand
- Died: 21 May 2004 (aged 71) Whangaparaoa, New Zealand
- Height: 1.75 m (5 ft 9 in)
- Weight: 79 kg (174 lb)
- School: Seddon Memorial Technical College

Rugby union career
- Position: Centre, wing
Provincial / State sides
Years	Team	Apps	(Points)
1953–60	Auckland		
International career
Years	Team	Apps	(Points)
1957–60	New Zealand	11	(12)

Raymond Frank McMullen (18 January 1933 – 21 May 2004) was a New Zealand rugby union player and referee. A centre and wing three-quarter, McMullen represented Auckland at a provincial level, and was a member of the New Zealand national side, the All Blacks, from 1957 to 1960. He played 29 matches for the All Blacks including 11 internationals. After retiring as a player in 1960, McMullen became a rugby union referee, reaching international level. His appointments included controlling the 1973 test between the All Blacks and the touring English team.
