= Kōwhai Intermediate School =

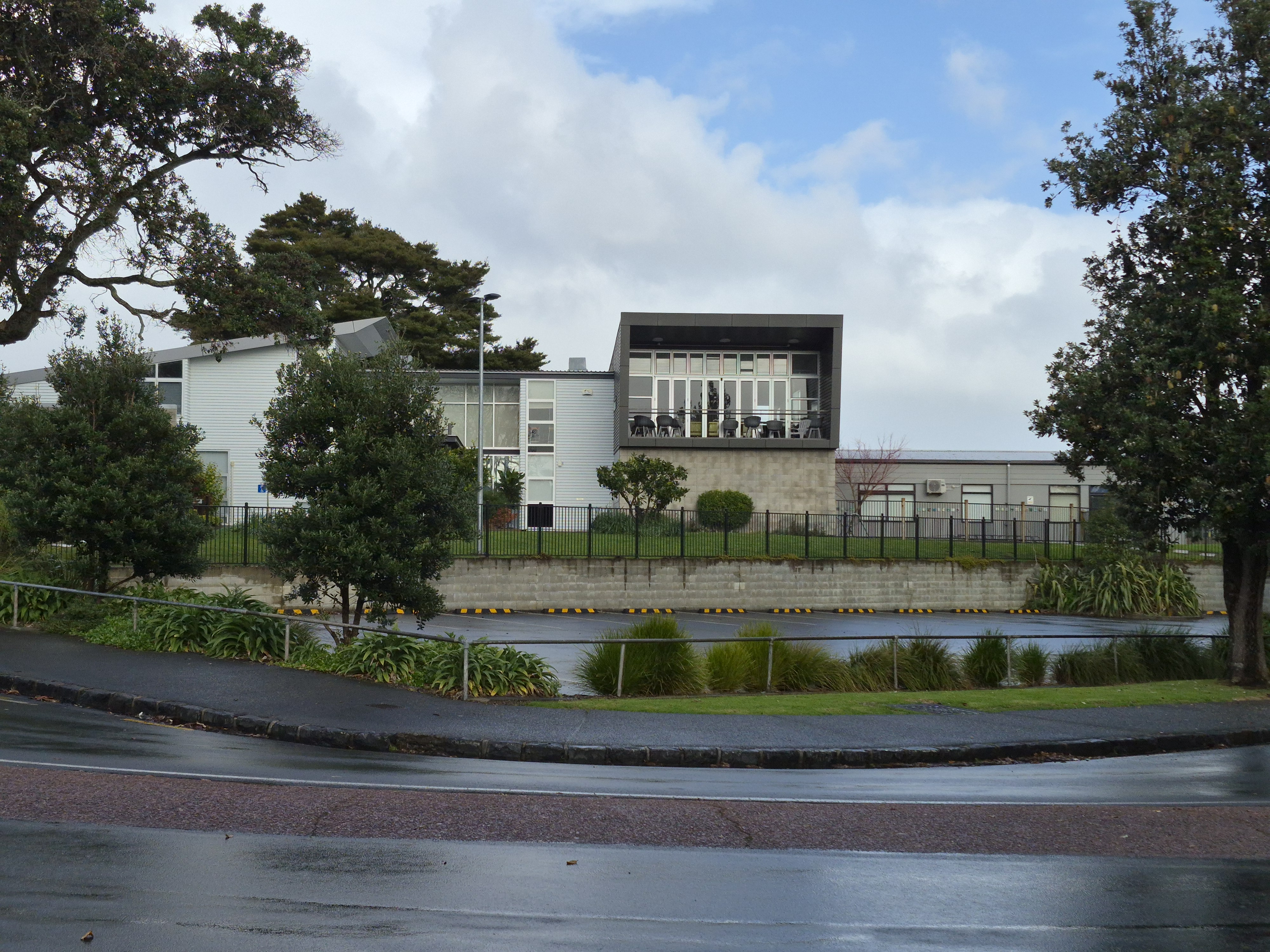

Location
- 26 Onslow Road; Kingsland; Auckland 1024; 36.872187°S 174.748562°E

Information
- Type: State, Co-educational, Intermediate Years 7-8
- Established: 1922
- Ministry of Education Institution no.: 1337
- Principal: Johanna Wrack
- Enrolment: 553 (July 2026)
- Website: www.kowhai.school.nz

Kōwhai Intermediate School is a state co-educational intermediate school located in the suburb of Kingsland in Auckland, New Zealand. The school opened in October 1922, and was the first intermediate school in New Zealand.

== History ==
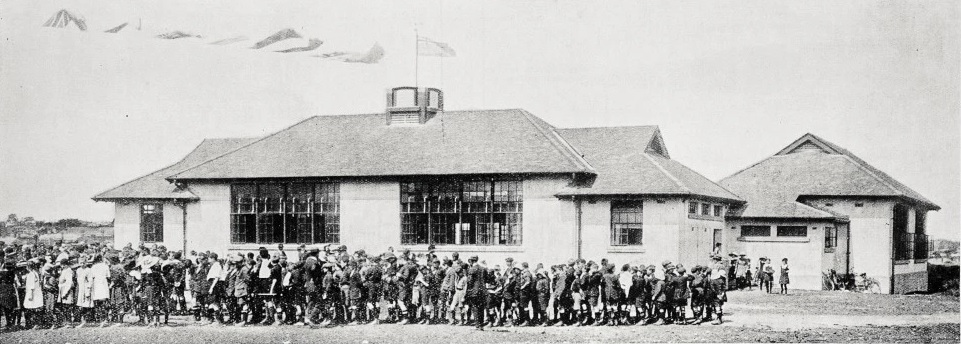
The opening day of Kowhai Junior High School

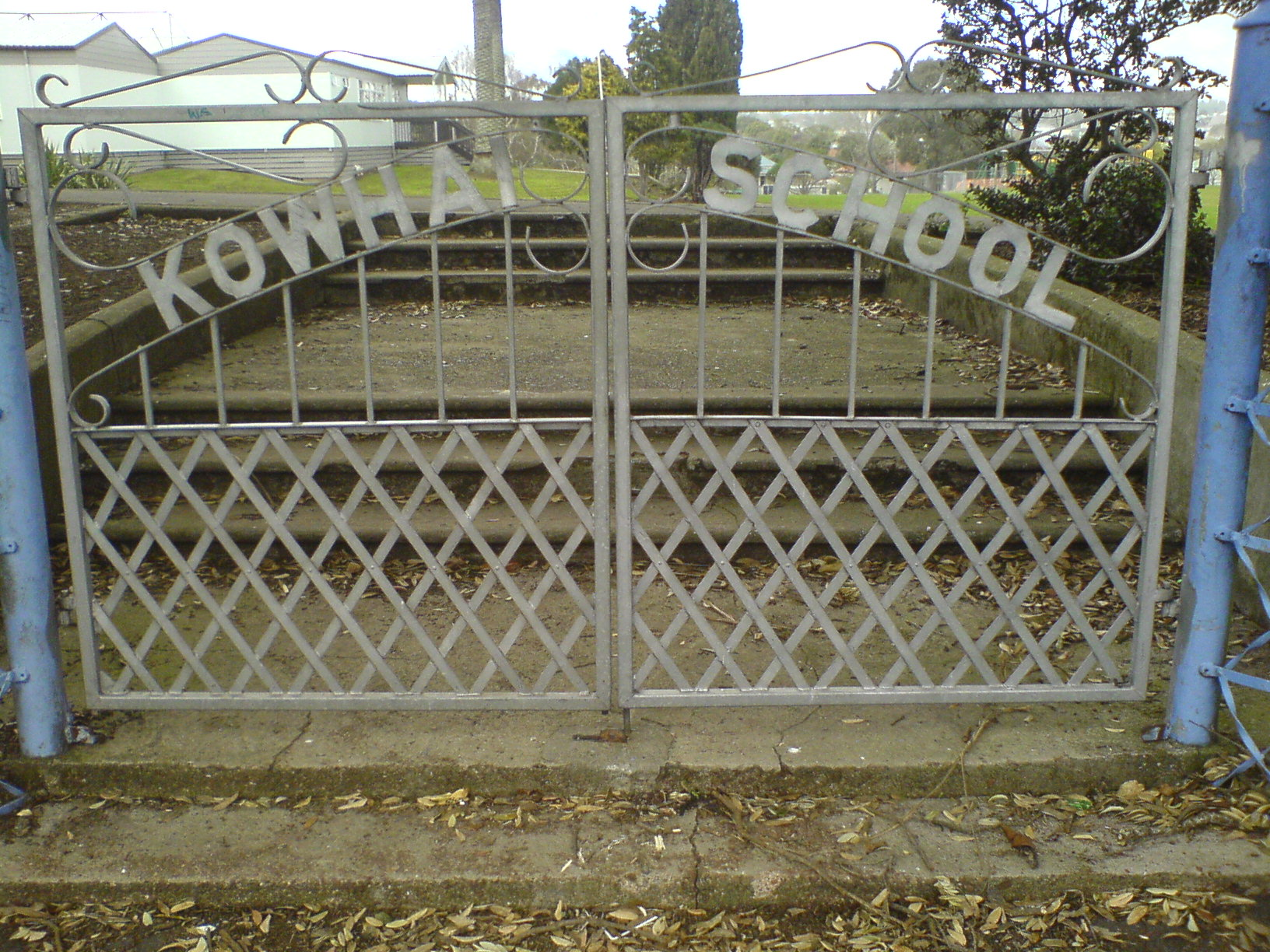
School gates

During the early 20th century, the borough of Mount Albert was one of the fastest growing areas of Auckland. Overcrowding at Edendale School was so great that by 1918, older students at the school were moved to a temporary satellite school in St Alban's Parish Hall.

In 1920, the New Zealand Government purchased a property on Kowhai Street in Kingsland to alleviate these issues. While Kingsland residents expected the government to establish a primary school on the site, the Department of Education decided to experiment with the facility, establishing the first intermediate school in the country. Intermediate schools were established as education specialists during the 1920s had begun to recognise early adolescence as a key time during development, and that this period of life needed special treatment in education.

The school opened on 1 October 1922, under the name Kowhai Junior High School. 670 students arrived on the first day, even though only 600 places were available at the school.

A new administration block and library were constructed for the school in 2004. In 2006, the school opened a Samoan language bilingual unit, Gafoa le Ata.

In 2018, Kōwhai Intermediate banned students' use of social media while being students of the school.

== Notable alumni ==
- Bob Harvey, mayor of Waitakere City
- Laulu Fetauimalemau Mataʻafa, Samoan politician and the first Samoan high commissioner to New Zealand
- Robert Muldoon, Prime Minister of New Zealand
- Nesian Mystik, hip-hop group
- Tigilau Ness, activist and reggae musician
