= Dominion Road =

Arterial road in central Auckland, New Zealand

Coordinates: 36.8968°S 174.7443°E

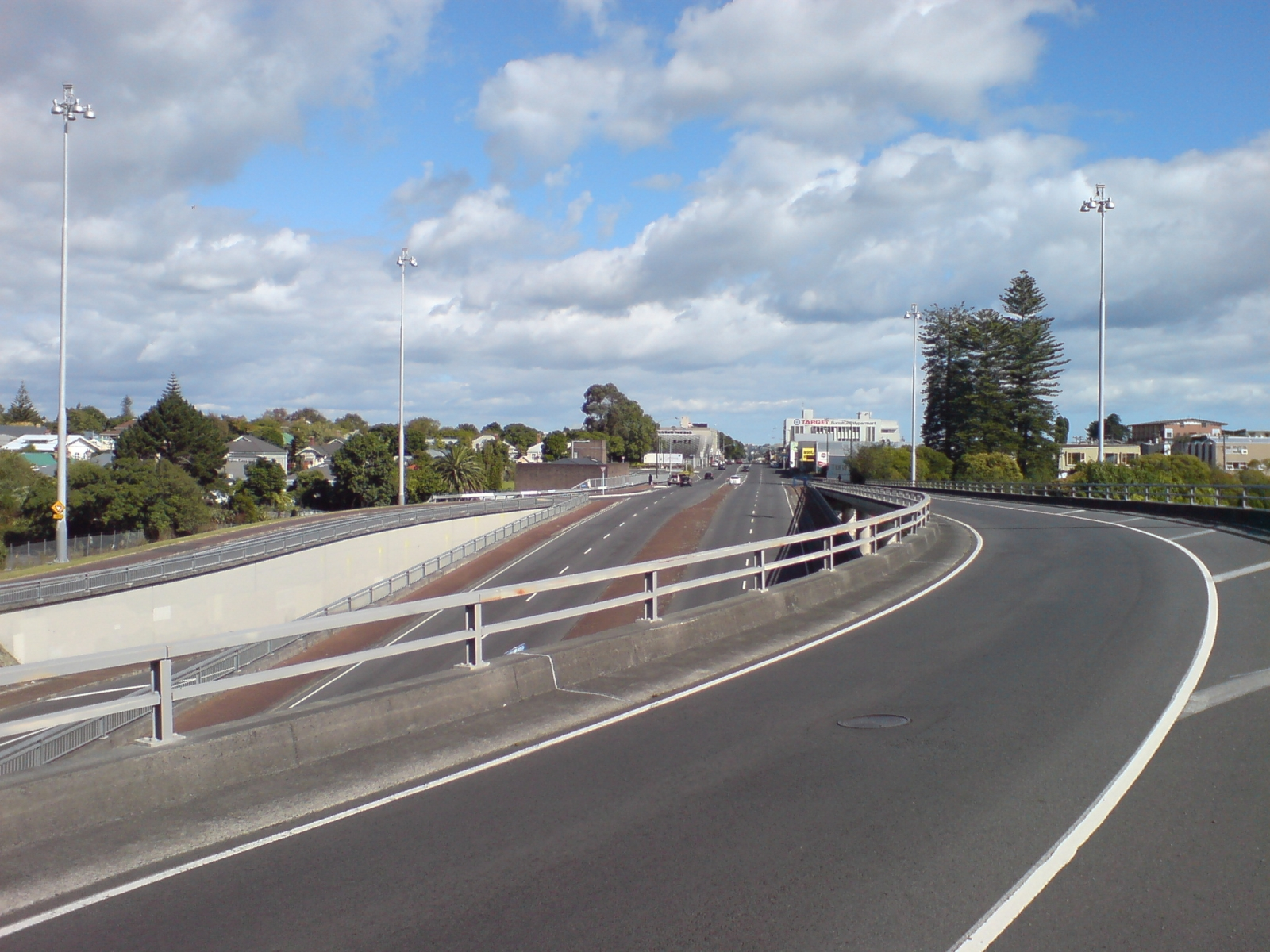
- The southern end of Ian McKinnon Drive, where it becomes Dominion Road
- Length: 7.3 km (4.5 mi)
- Location: Auckland, New Zealand
- Postal code: 1024 (north of Balmoral Road); 1041 (south of Balmoral Road)
- North end: Ian McKinnon Drive, New North Road
- Major junctions: SH 20 Southwestern Motorway
- South end: Hillsborough Road

Dominion Road is an arterial road in Auckland, New Zealand, running north–south across most of the Auckland isthmus. It is a major public transport route that carries 50,000 bus passengers each week.

The road, which passes through mostly suburban areas (and several town centres), has a mix of shops.

Many Asian restaurants line the road between Valley Road and Kensington Avenue. A "Dumplings on Dominion" Festival was held in 2020 to celebrate one aspect of Chinese cuisine, with 37 businesses taking part. A sculpture of noodles being pulled by chopsticks from underground was exhibited in two places on Dominion Road between 2015 and 2021.

== Route ==
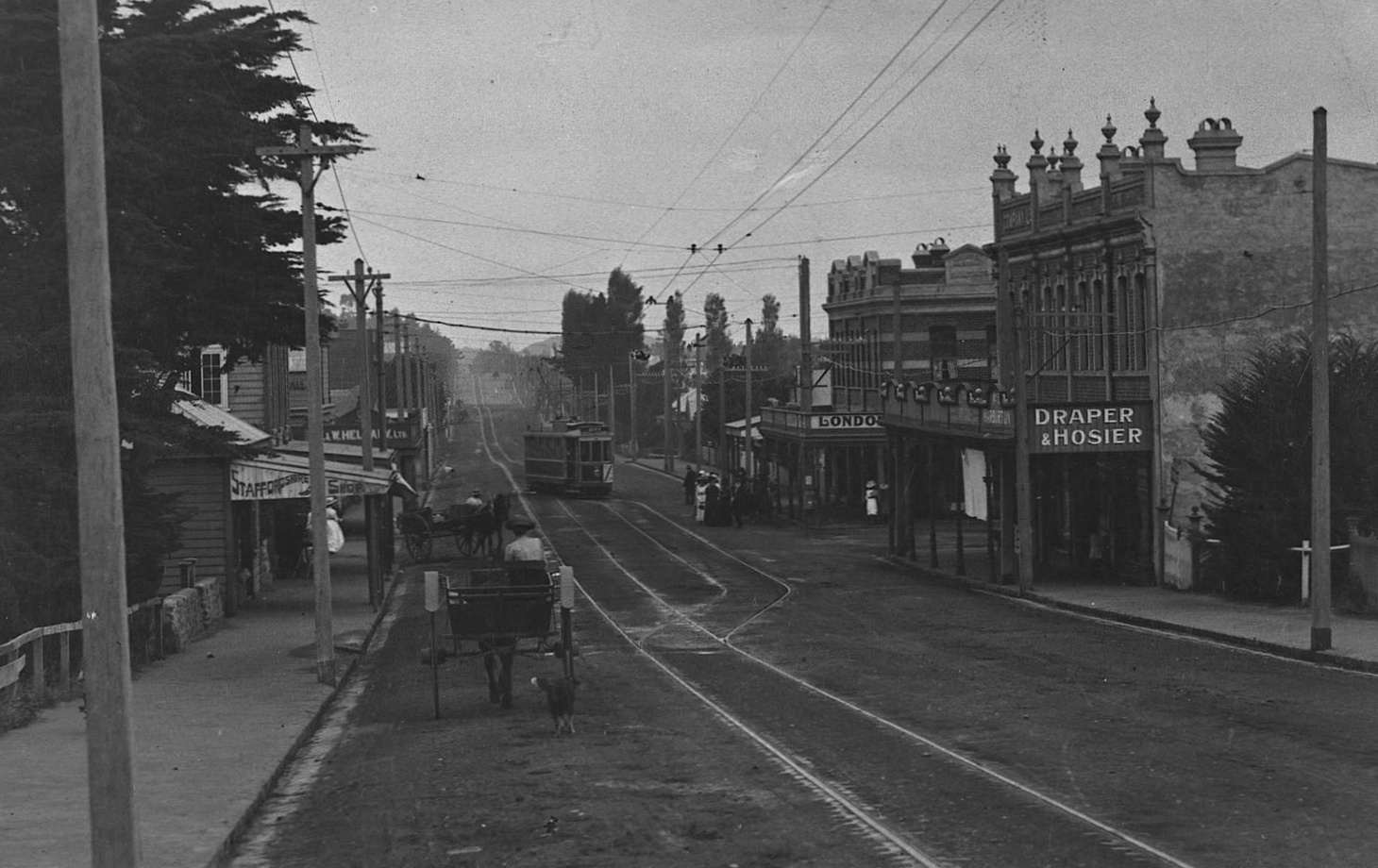
Dominion Road in the 1900s, showing its origins as a typical "tram era" street.

The road is the longest stretch of straight road on the Auckland isthmus, stretching from the northern part of Mount Eden to the Manukau Harbour.

== History ==
The road was created in the late 1840s by Cornish settler John Walters, who made the path to better connect his farm (at modern-day Bellevue Road) to Eden Terrace in the north. The road was developed in the 1860s, and for much of its early life was known as Mt Roskill Road. The road's name was changed in 1907, to celebrate the proclamation of New Zealand becoming a Dominion. In the 1910s, the road stopped at Landscape Road (then known as Boundary Road), as further to the south, a series of small hills known to early Aucklanders as the Kopjes hindered travel.

The road was extended to the south in the 1920s, and in 1929 the road to the south which met Hillsborough Road, Arkell Road, was renamed as Dominion Road Extension.

Around the late 1920s more than 15,000 people used the road for either travel or commerce.

=== 1960s motorway proposal ===
Dominion Road was proposed as a new motorway route south from the CBD in the 1960s. In the early 1960s, a flyover was constructed at the intersection of Dominion Road and New North Road, removing many houses and commercial buildings. With the exception of the interchange, this proposal never came to pass. In 2014 a proposal was made to demolish the interchange.

=== 2010s public transport upgrade proposal ===
In late 2010, a proposed Council upgrade to the road, which was to focus on improving public transport and cycling links (via 24/7 bus lanes and cycle lanes), created substantial public debate. Conflicting views existed on whether the necessary removal of parking (a good part of which was to be reinstated in side roads as extra angle parking) would significantly harm the road, reducing amenity for locals, and endangering the street's shops. Further heavily criticised was the concurrent proposal by the Citizens & Ratepayers-dominated Council to remove the bus lanes and replace them with transit lanes allowing cars.

The proposed upgrade was eventually tabled to be revisited only after the elections creating the first unified Auckland Council. The new Council decided in 2011 to proceed with a less extensive plan that would provide only some extensions and upgrades of bus lanes and cycling facilities, and would retain parking in the bus lanes outside of peak hours, a move that was applauded by some local business owners. Road widening designations, and previous Council land purchases worth about $20 million, that would have allowed for the more extensive works will partially be lifted / sold around 2012, as soon as the extent of the new scheme is known.

=== Rapid transit plans ===
In January 2015 Auckland Transport initiated a study of building new rapid transit routes to replace buses on some of its most heavily used bus routes. Dominion Road was one of the six rapid transit routes being studied that had originally been routes on Auckland's old tram network.

== Mutton Birds song ==
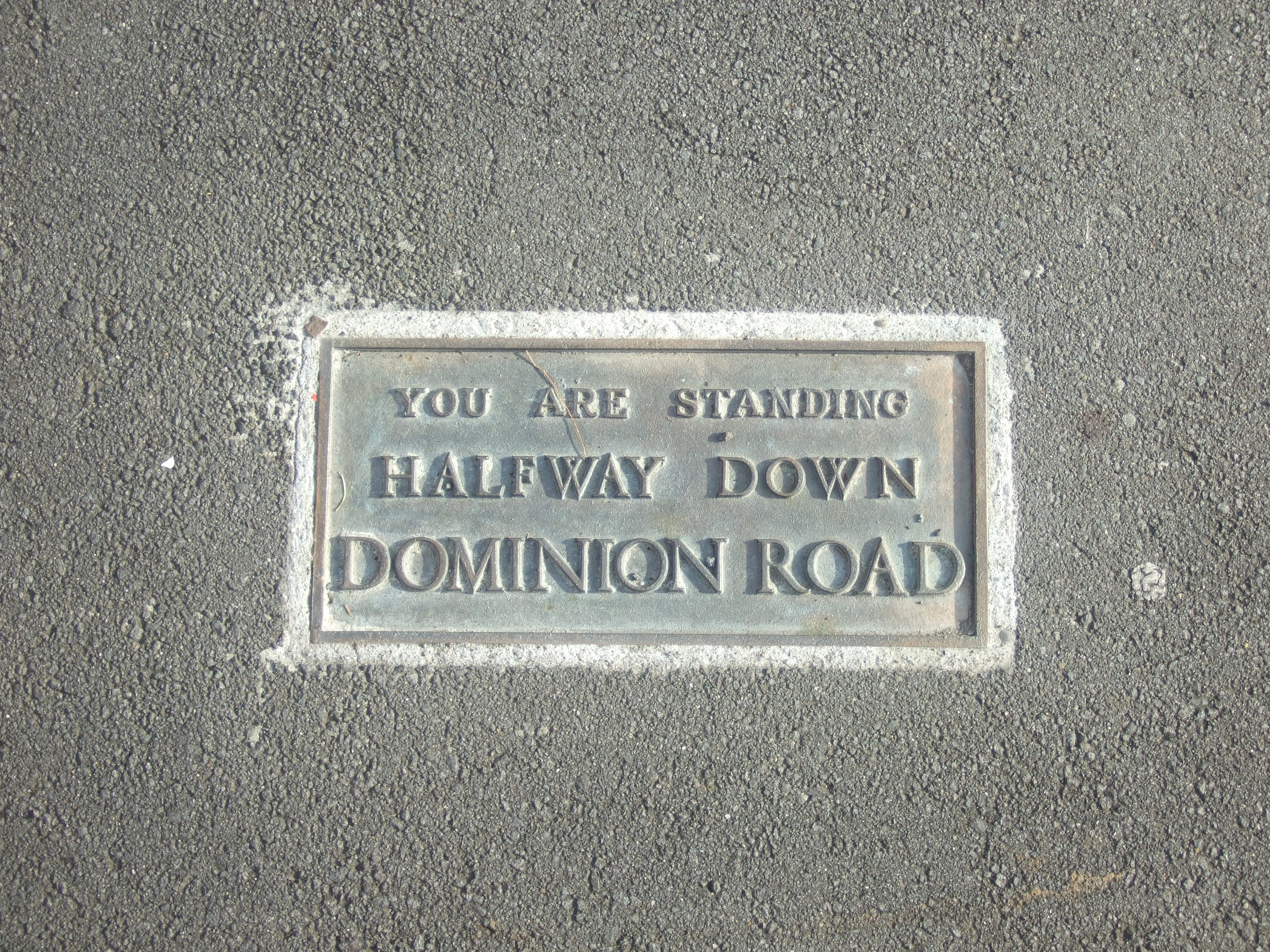
Unofficial Plaque marking halfway point along Dominion Road

Dominion Road was mentioned in a 1992 song by The Mutton Birds.

The song's music video suggests that halfway down Dominion Road is the intersection of Peary Road and Dominion Road, and much of the video's footage shows the area between the road's Balmoral shops and Mt. Roskill shops. In 2013 a brass plaque was placed in the footpath by an anonymous artist to mark the halfway point along the road.

== Major intersections ==
Local Board	Suburb	km	jct	Destinations	Notes
Waitemata	Eden Terrace	0.0		Ian McKinnon Drive	Dominion Road begins
Waitemata	Eden Terrace	0.2		New North Road (east)	Northbound exit and southbound entrance only
Albert–Eden	Mount Eden	0.5		View Road	
Albert–Eden	Mount Eden	0.5		George Street	
Albert–Eden	Mount Eden	0.9		Valley Road; Walters Road	
Albert–Eden	Mount Eden	2.2		Balmoral Road (east) – Remuera; Balmoral Road (west) – Western Springs	
Albert–Eden	Mount Eden	3.2		Landscape Road	
Puketapapa	Mount Roskill	3.2		Landscape Road	
Puketapapa	Mount Roskill	4.2		Mount Albert Road (east) – Three Kings, Royal Oak; Mount Albert Road (west) – Mount Albert	
Puketapapa	Mount Roskill	4.8		Denbigh Avenue	
Puketapapa	Mount Roskill	4.9		SH 20 south (Southwestern Motorway) – Manukau, Airport	
Puketapapa	Mount Roskill	5.0		SH 20 north (Southwestern Motorway) – Waitākere, Auckland	
Puketapapa	Mount Roskill	6.0		Richardson Road (east) – Hillsborough; Richardson Road (west) – New Lynn	
Puketapapa	Mount Roskill	7.3		Hillsborough Road (east) – Hillsborough; Hillsborough Road (west) – Lynfield, Blockhouse Bay	Dominion Road ends
