= Ferndale, New Zealand =

Ferndale, New Zealand may refer to:

- Ferndale House, a historic home in Mount Albert, Auckland
- Ferndale, Taranaki, a suburb of New Plymouth
- A fictitious suburb of Auckland in which the television programme Shortland Street takes place.
