= Allendale Girls' Home =

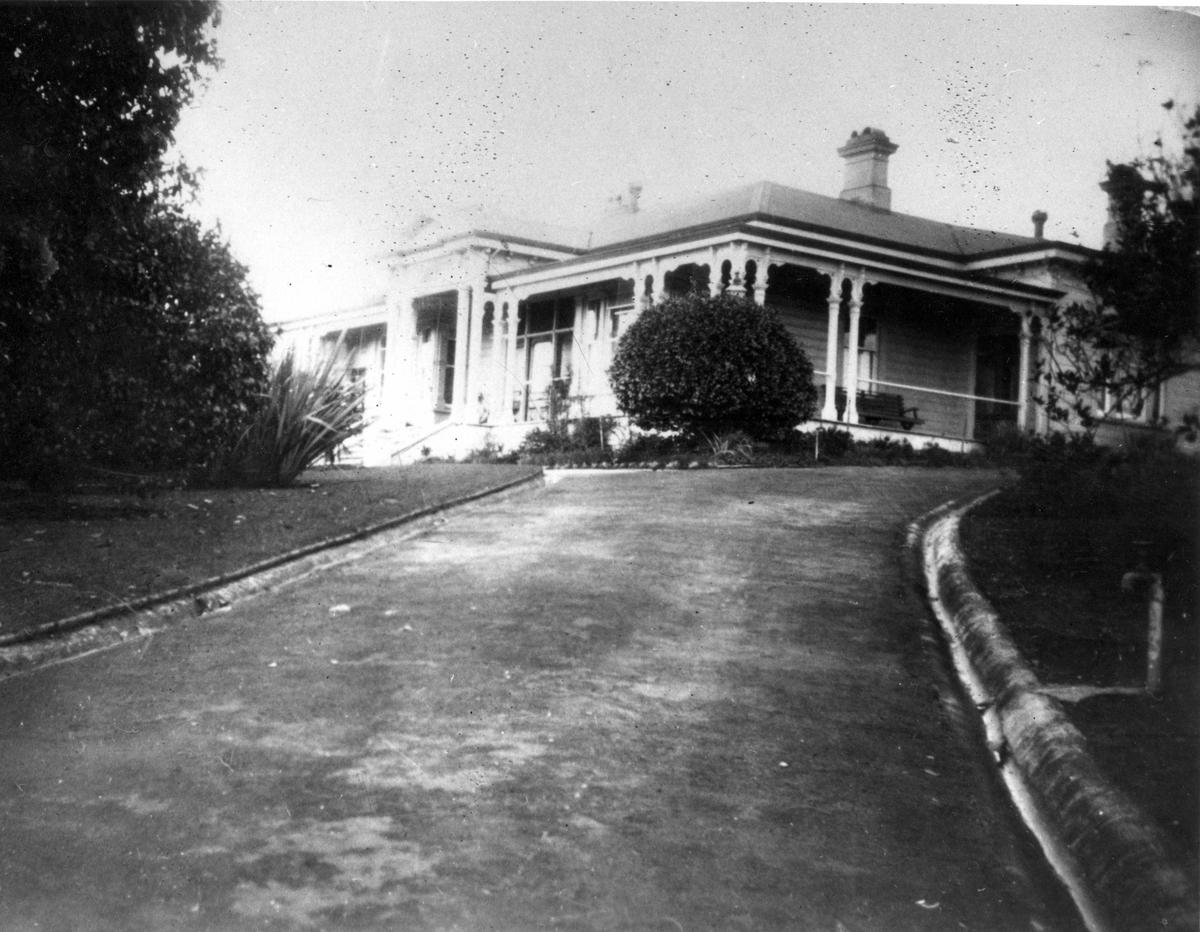
- Tyntesfield circa 1900

Location
- 44 Allendale Road; Mount Albert; Auckland

Information
- Former names: Tyntesfield
- Opened: 1961
- Closed: 1989
- Oversight: Department of Social Welfare
- Gender: Female
- Age range: 11 -17
- Classrooms: 2

Allendale Girls' Home (also known as Auckland Girls' Home or Allendale Road Girl's Home) was a state care residential facility in the suburb of Mount Albert, Auckland, New Zealand.

== History ==
Edward Allen purchased 99 acres of Mount Albert land upon his arrival to New Zealand in 1861, and built his home Allendale, which Allendale Road was named after. Allen sold the land to William Winstone in 1882.

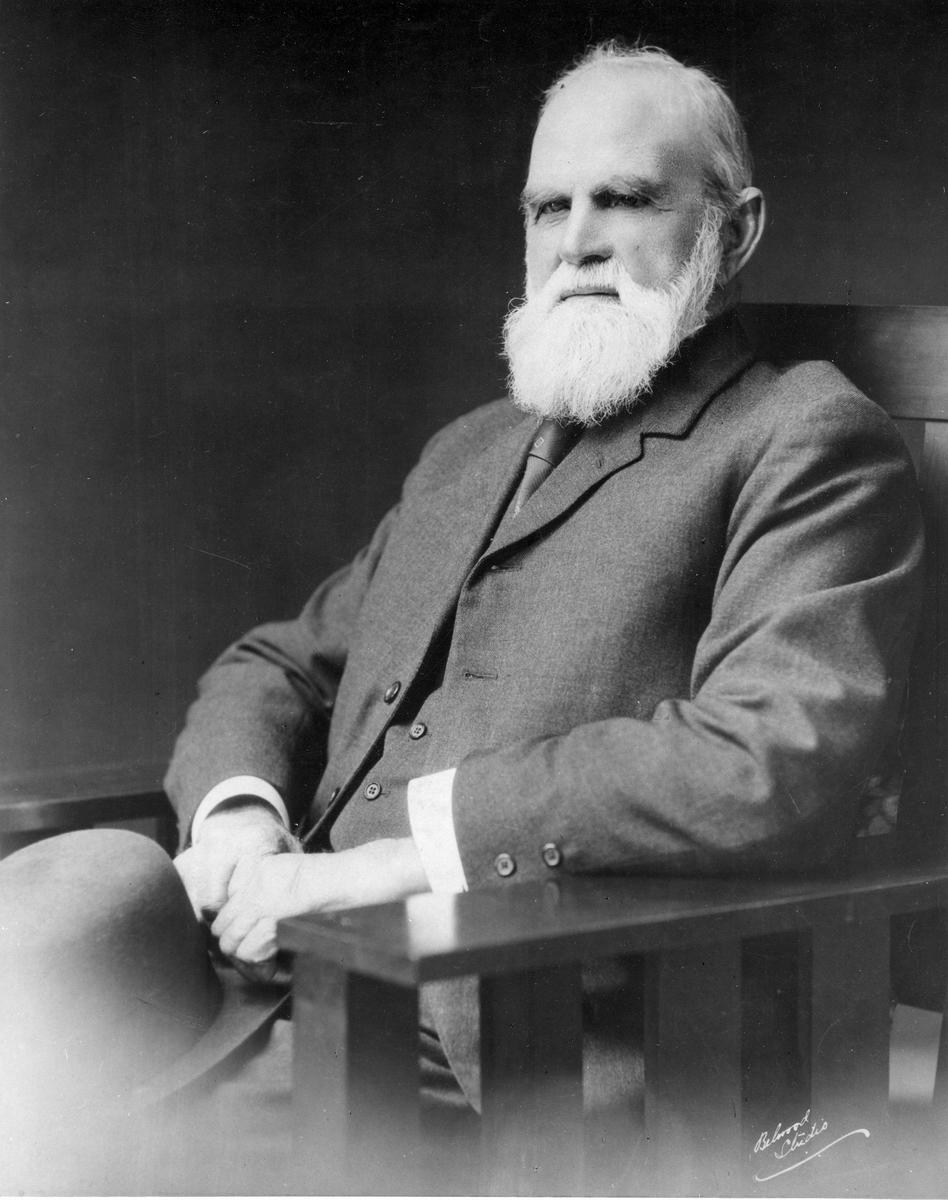
William Winstone in later life

=== Tyntesfield ===
Early Auckland businessman William Winstone built Tyntesfield near his old house Failand (also known as 'Winstone House' or 'Belmont', located on Stillwell Road, Mount Albert), which he had transported from its original position on Symonds Street. Tyntesfield would be William Winstone and his wife Ellen's final home, with Ellen dying there in 1904, and William following in 1924. In 1925, Winstone's Mount Albert estate was sold off in twenty-nine sections. The Tyntesfield parcel was purchased by Mr. George Guy for £410.

=== Y.M.C.A. Boys Hostel ===
Tyntesfield and its grounds became a boys' hostel for wards of the state considered to be "deserving a secondary education". This was not solely a state-run initiative, and was a collaborative effort between the Costley trustees, Y.M.C.A and the Child Welfare Department. The scheme began in 1923 in Mount Eden, and moved to Mount Roskill in 1925, but by 1928 the facilities were too small so a new location was needed. They housed cohorts of ten to fifteen boys and prepared them for future employment based on their skills and interests by securing them a secondary education, an opportunity not otherwise available to them. Some graduates of the hostel succeeded, gaining apprenticeship positions with printers, chemists, architects and engineers, and others continued to further study or were able to find solid employment. Tyntesfield was purchased in 1928 for its size and proximity to Mount Albert Grammar School for the boys to attend. The hostel was opened in 1929 by Harry Atmore, Minister of Education, ready to house fifteen boys in the charge of Mr. Drew (director), Mrs. Robson (matron) and Miss Robson. By September, the matron and assistant were replaced by Mrs. I. J. Paddock and Ms. J. McKay. The house required renovations, and funds were raised in aid of this during its first year, including a garden party organised by the Y.M.C.A. ladies auxiliary on the house's grounds to conjure support.

== Allendale Girls' Home ==
Between the 1950s and 1980s, the New Zealand government removed over 100,000 children from situations of neglect and abuse into state care institutions. Allendale Girls' Home was started in 1961 on the Tyntesfield property by the Department of Social Welfare, following the trend of the increasing number of state wards and care facilities in New Zealand after World War II.

Allendale was a short to mid-term facility, originally holding girls for 6 to 8 weeks at a time, though the average stay increased between 1966 and 1980 from 3 to 6–9 months. It housed girls aged 11–14, though this varied as in 1979 the range was recorded as being 14 to 17. The population was mostly made up of state wards, and girls taken in by police as runaways or engaged in sex work around the wharf at the waterfront. In 1966, between 20 and 25% of girls admitted had sexually transmitted infections, and before 1978, every child was forced to undergo an invasive medical examination for VD upon admittance.

Some Allendale girls attended local schools, but most were occupied with repetitive and limited domestic chores and household duties. By the late 1960s, the need for an internal school was acknowledged. Education at Allendale was limited and inconsistent even with the addition of schooling facilities, with high staff turnover and teachers not turning up to work.

In the mid-1970s, the principal of the Home noted that 50% of the girls leaving Allendale to foster placements were readmitted, and attributed this to poor placement and inadequate follow-up by the State. Other outcomes upon release included returning home or being relocated to other institutions, such as Kingsley or Farnham House.

=== Facilities ===
Allendale Girls' Home consisted of Tyntesfield, its grounds, and a staff house. The Tyntesfield house was described by its later owners as well-built, functional and beautiful with kauri floorboards, wide corridors and heritage features. The Home could hold 25 girls, with 3 additional secure rooms apart from the main accommodation.

Like other short-term state care institutions, overcrowding proved an issue at Allendale from the mid-1960s due to increasing numbers of children entering state care. In 1966, a visiting reporter noted that 32 girls were living in accommodations for 15, with many sleeping on mattresses on the floor.

Allendale's three secure rooms had steel doors with an observation panel, and were made of concrete. They could function as solitary confinement for 'temporarily intractable' girls, or those at risk of running away. The use of secure rooms was standard in state care institutions at the time, with 90% of the 4161 children in state custody in 1986 having experienced them. Time inside ranged from hours to weeks or months. The department dictated secure rooms to be used for especially difficult or uncontrollable behaviour, but staff often employed them for relatively minor offences including stealing a fork, talking back or running away. They were also used as overflow rooms when overcrowding occurred. In 1965, Allendale defended its secure room practices of solitary confinement for days at a time, confiscation of pyjamas and enforcing periods of silence as "deliberately and soundly based." Reading was also banned in the secure rooms at Allendale. The Department of Social Welfare's inspection of the facility found the secure rooms "dreary and cheerless", with buckets for toilets and no heating. One Allendale survivor described being aged twelve and heavily pregnant when she was locked in a secure room for two weeks as punishment for absconding. There was a toilet bucket, and a single blanket with a hard mattress to sleep on.

A two-roomed school, swimming pool and softball facilities were added by the department after the advice of a critical 1982 report on the institution, in an effort to make the facilities more reformative and attractive for its inhabitants. A ministerial inquiry in the early 1980s also noted the Allendale property would be better as a "gentleman's residence" rather than an institution for 23 young girls.

=== Escapes ===
Absconding was a regular occurrence throughout Allendale's lifespan. On average around 150 girls ran away per year. Articles on some Allendale escapes featured in New Zealand newspapers, such as an instance of nine girls absconding in June 1963. By late 1963, night staff were employed to mitigate the phenomenon, but made little difference. In 1964, two men were charged for harbouring two absconding Allendale girls aged 13 and 14, who stayed at their house in Herne Bay between the 16th and 24 November that year. A neighbour living next to Allendale in 1975 recalled girls running away from the property in stashed street clothes on bicycles to go to the waterfront, before seeing them later returned to the institution by police. In a single incident in 1978, the entire population of 30 girls residing at Allendale absconded at once. Dr Niva Thakurdas, an Auckland gynaecologist who worked at Allendale in the 1970s and 1980s, considered the escapes a product of boredom rather than mistreatment.

=== Demographics ===
Racial discrimination in the welfare system led to higher amounts of Māori and Pasifika children entering state care, dominating residential institution demographics by the 1970s. Allendale's population was disproportionately made up of Māori and Pasifika girls, and between February and April 1975, 61% of admissions were of Māori descent, and 8% were of Pasifika descent. This trend continued into Allendale's final decade, with racial overrepresentation recorded in 1981 and 1983.

=== Abuse in Care ===
Allendale Girls' Home was one of many state care institutions that the Department of Social Welfare largely left to its own devices, without frequent internal reports or external monitoring. Allendale was one of several Auckland institutions alleged to be in breach of the 1977 Human Rights Commission Act in terms of its practices and procedures in relation to the State's duty of care to children under its wardship, particularly regarding the compulsory medical examinations and reliance on secure rooms. An Allendale survivor recalled the roughness of an internal examination performed on her as a child entering Allendale, causing permanent internal damage and lifelong fear in medical settings. Though VD checks were not compulsory after 1978, refusal to comply resulted in threats of removal of home leave, privileges, or time in a secure room until a discussion with the doctor could be had.

While an 1983 investigation into the alleged Human Rights Act breaches in Auckland state care institutions found Allendale to be less problematic than others, such as the Bollard Girls' Home, the 2024 Royal Commission of Inquiry into Historical Abuse in State Care and in the Care of Faith-based Institutions found instances of abuse and neglect. In the final report of the Royal Commission of Inquiry into Abuse in Care, Allendale was described as a "soul destroying place" that broke people's spirits. A survivor recounted her experience of the Home in the 1970s, of a girl crying in the corner while staff ignored it, not seeming to "care at all". One ex-Allendale woman who visited the relocated Tyntesfield house in the 2000s recalled being taken outside, whipped and locked up as a child, noting “it wasn’t an evil place, but bad things happened there.”

=== Closure ===
By 1970 the inadequate conditions and facilities had taken their toll not only on the girls but Allendale's employees, and many staff resigned in protest. The closure of the home was proposed to the Department of Social Welfare the same year, but this was "rejected on the grounds that it would embarrass the government, and closure would likely be opposed by the State Services Commission." By the late 1970s, the behaviour of admissions was noted to be markedly worse, girls increasingly "disturbed and confrontational", and in 1979 Allendale was described to be in a "near riot" situation.

Allendale Girls' Home was shut down in May 1989 following the Labour government's programme of deinstitutionalisation in favour of community-based care schemes. Social welfare institutions across New Zealand closed, including Allendale. Members of the Mount Albert Council objected to the closure, with deputy Mayor Alice Wylie stating her concern they were sending girls back into harmful situations.

The site's pool was filled in, softball facilities removed, and in 1990 the land was sold by the State. The Tyntesfield house was shifted from its original location and Winstone's land was sold to a developer for $640,000 in 1996, who then subdivided the property into eight sections. Each sold for around $300,000. Tyntesfield was purchased in 2002 and restored by John and Christine Hames.

== Legacy ==
Though Allendale Girls' Home no longer exists, the now privately owned Tyntesfield house and its grounds remain tied to the history of abuse in care in New Zealand. Many children who passed through Allendale continued to suffer its impacts in later life in various forms, including addiction. In 2024 the New Zealand Government issued a formal apology to survivors for the "abuse... suffered while in state care, churches and other faith-based places" following the conclusion of the Royal Commission of Inquiry into Abuse in Care.
