= Auckland Institute of Studies =

Private university in Auckland, New Zealand

Coordinates: 36°52′24.86″S 174°43′15.21″E

- Former name: AIS St Helens
- Type: Private
- Established: 8 March 1990
- Academic affiliation: CRIE
- Chairman: Allen Hsieh
- President: Dr Lehan J. Stemmet
- CEO: Richard Smith
- Location: Auckland, New Zealand
- Campus: Multiple
- Colours: Red and white
- Website: www.ais.ac.nz

Auckland Institute of Studies (AIS) (formerly AIS St Helens; Māori: Te Whare Wānanga ki Hato Herena) is the leading privately owned tertiary institute in Auckland, New Zealand.

== History ==
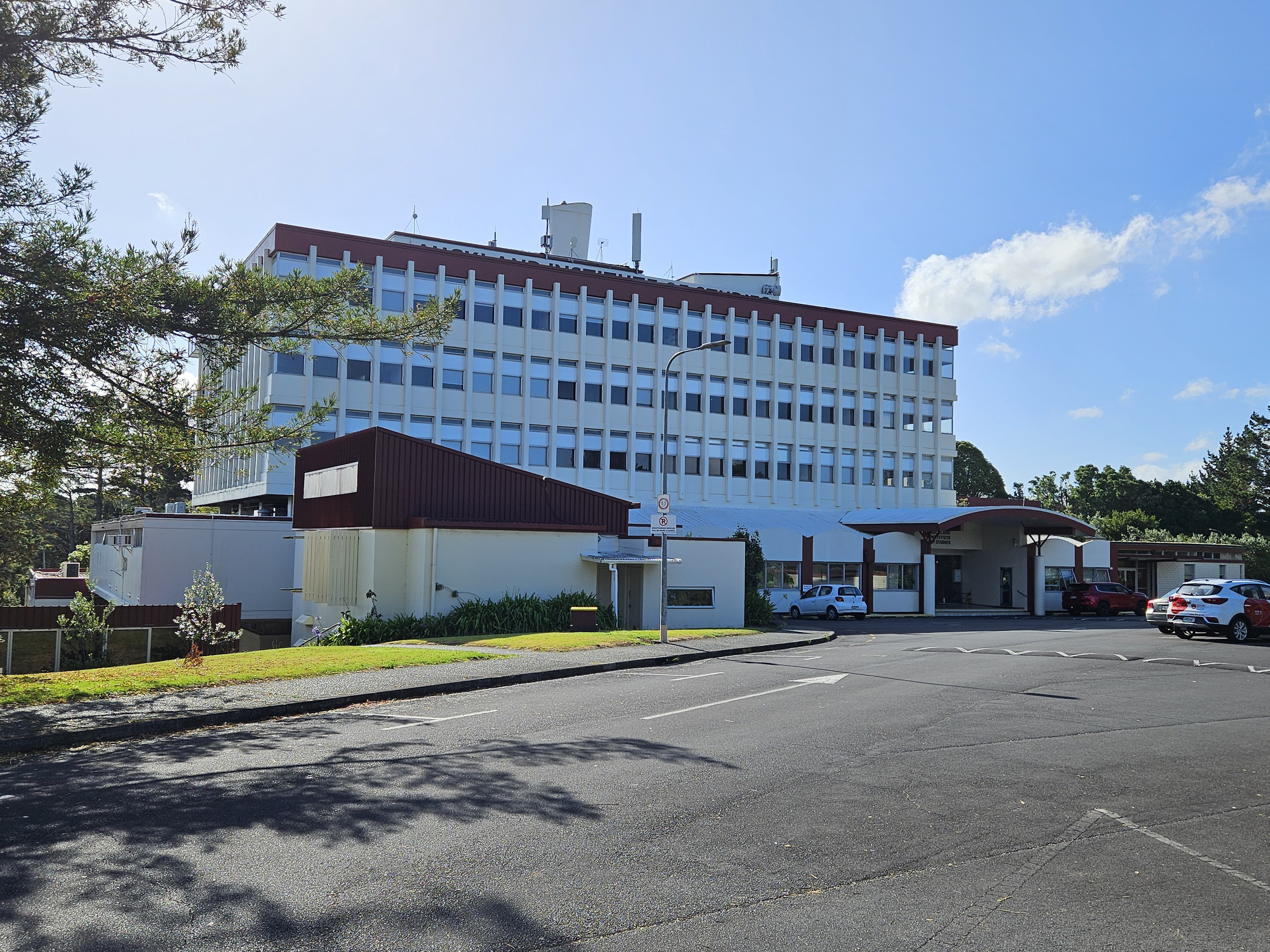
Auckland Institute of Studies St Helens Campus

AIS was established in 1990, in Auckland's Downtown shopping centre. It moved into the former St Helens Maternity Hospital in Mt Albert, Auckland in 1993, after converting it into a tertiary residential campus.

The institute now has two campuses in Mt Albert: St Helens Campus, located at 28a Linwood Ave and Asquith Campus, located at 120 Asquith Ave.

AIS offers bachelor and masters level degree programmes in business, information technology, tourism management, and hospitality management. The institute's own English Language Centre offers a range of English language courses including English teacher training (CertTESOL).

The institute is closely affiliated with the Centre for Research in International Education (CRIE).

== Courses ==
=== Study areas ===
- Accounting and Finance
- Business administration
- Computer Networks
- E-Business
- English Language
- Hospitality Management
- Information Systems
- Information Technology
- International Business
- International Trade
- Management and Marketing
- Operations and Logistics
- Software Development
- Teacher Training
- Tourism Management

=== Qualifications ===
- 2 masters degrees
- 7 postgraduate and graduate diplomas and certificates
- 4 bachelors degree programmes
- 7 diploma and certificate programmes

== Educational and Industry Links ==
AIS has strategic alliances and articulation agreements (see MOU) with the following education institutions in New Zealand and overseas:

=== New Zealand ===
- Auckland University of Technology
- Ignite Colleges
- Intern NZ and Intern OZ
- Kalandra Education Group
- Languages International
- Mount Albert Grammar School
- Mt Maunganui Language School
- New Zealand Institute of Education
- St Peter's College
- Unitec Institute of Technology
- Worldwide School of English

=== International ===
- Changwon Moonsung University, Korea
- Chihlee Institute of Technology, Taiwan
- Chinese Service Centre for Scholarly Exchange, China
- Chung Yuan Christian University, Taiwan
- Confederation of Tourism and Hospitality, United Kingdom
- Huangang Normal University, China
- Informatics Education, Singapore
- International Institute of Management Sciences, India
- International Management Institute Switzerland Ltd
- Manav Rachna International Institute of Research and Studies, India
- Scottish Qualification Authority, United Kingdom
- Shih Chien University, Taiwan
- Silicon Lake Vocational and Technology College, China
- Telfort Education Group, China
- Tianjin Normal University Jingu College, China
- Tonga Institute of Higher Education, Tonga
- Tupou Tertiary Institute, Tonga
- Universiti Teknologi Mara, Malaysia
- Xuzhou University of Technology, China

=== Industry Links ===
The institute has strong links within the hospitality industry which facilitates internship and job placement opportunities for hospitality students.

== Internships ==
AIS offers internship opportunities in various industries to graduates and current students via a specialist organisation Intern NZ . Internship placements are coordinated via the institute's Student Careers Centre (SCC).
