= Mount Albert, New Zealand =

Mount Albert
- Suburb
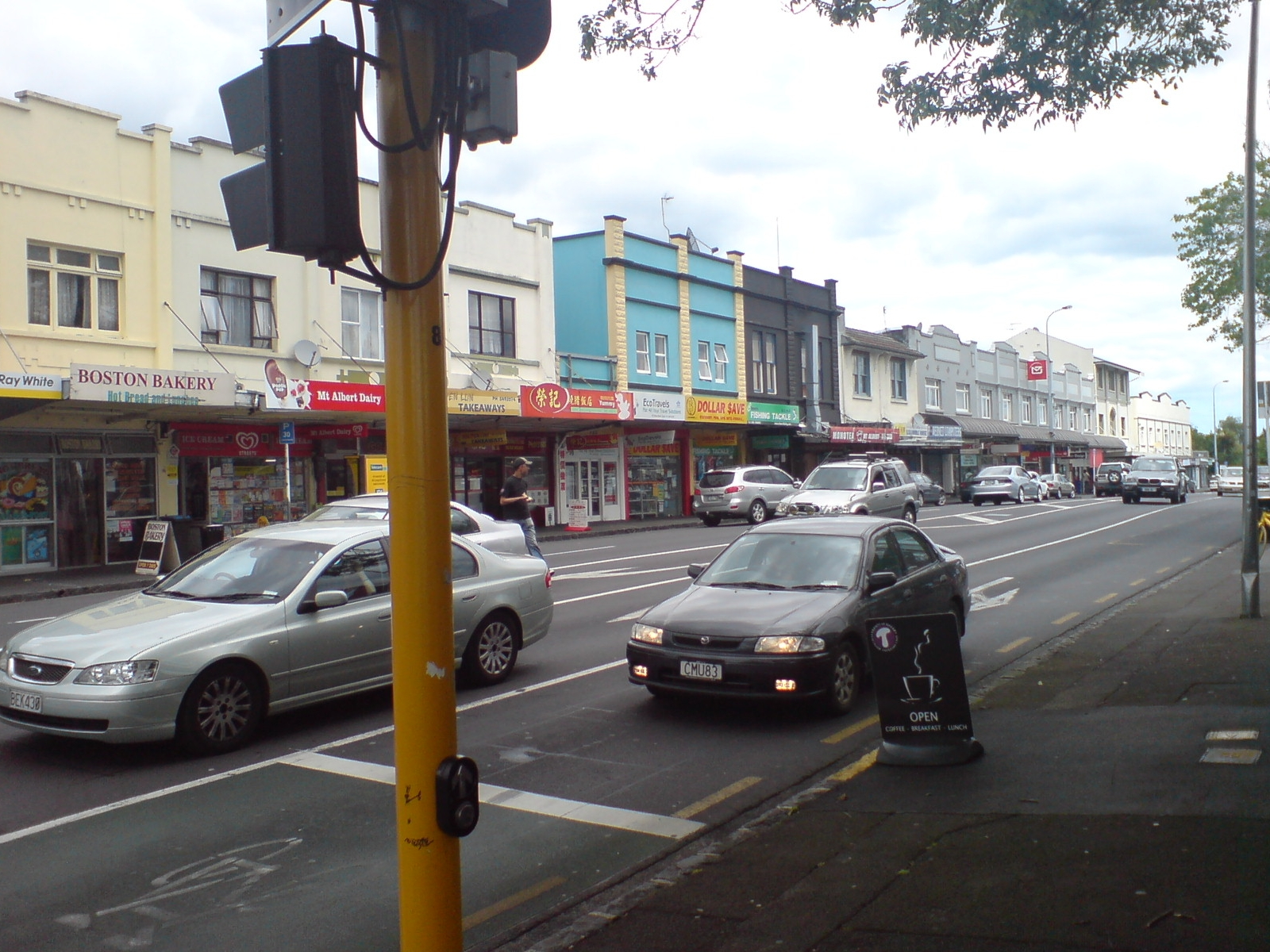
- The town centre, dominated by New North Road
- Interactive map of Mount Albert
- Coordinates: 36.884°S 174.716°E
- Country: New Zealand
- City: Auckland
- Local authority: Auckland Council
- Electoral ward: Albert-Eden-Puketāpapa ward
- Local board: Albert-Eden Local Board

Area
  - Land: 504 ha (1,250 acres)

Population (June 2025)
  - Total: 13,520
  - Density: 2,680/km^{2} (6,950/sq mi)
- Train stations: Baldwin Avenue railway station Mount Albert railway station

Point Chevalier	Western Springs	Morningside
Waterview	Mount Albert	St Lukes
Avondale	Ōwairaka	Sandringham

Mount Albert (Māori: Ōwairaka) (Note: While Ōwairaka is a name that could refer to the mountain, Ōwairaka / Mount Albert, or the suburb to the south, Ōwairaka, the names Ōwairaka or Ōwairaka Mount Albert are also used to refer to the Mount Albert suburb.) is an inner suburb of Auckland, New Zealand, which is centred on Ōwairaka / Mount Albert, a local volcanic peak which dominates the landscape. By 1911, growth in the area had increased to the point where Mount Albert was declared an independent borough, which was later absorbed into Auckland. The suburb is located 7 kilometres (4.3 mi) to the southwest of the Auckland City Centre.

== Geography ==
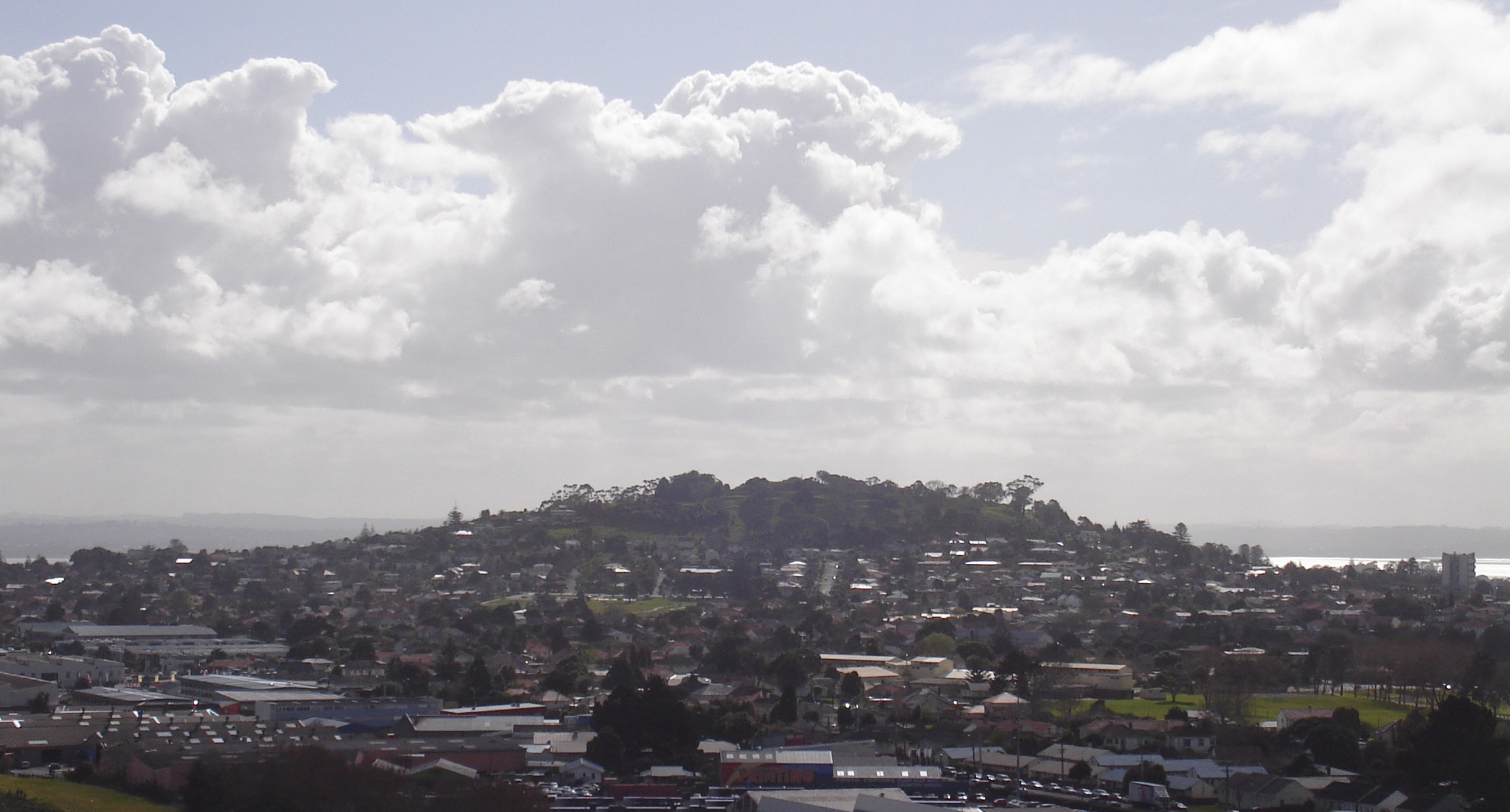
Ōwairaka / Mount Albert surrounded by the suburb in 2009

The suburb is centred around Ōwairaka / Mount Albert, a volcano which erupted an estimated 120,000 years ago. Ōwairaka / Mount Albert is one of the older volcanoes in the Auckland volcanic field, and the westernmost volcanic feature. Approximately 28,000 years ago, Te Kōpuke / Mount Saint John erupted, causing a lava flow in northern Mount Albert, which flowed into the Waitematā Harbour and created the Meola Reef.

Oakley Creek is a major stream on the Auckland isthmus, which forms the western border of the suburb.

== History ==
=== Early history ===
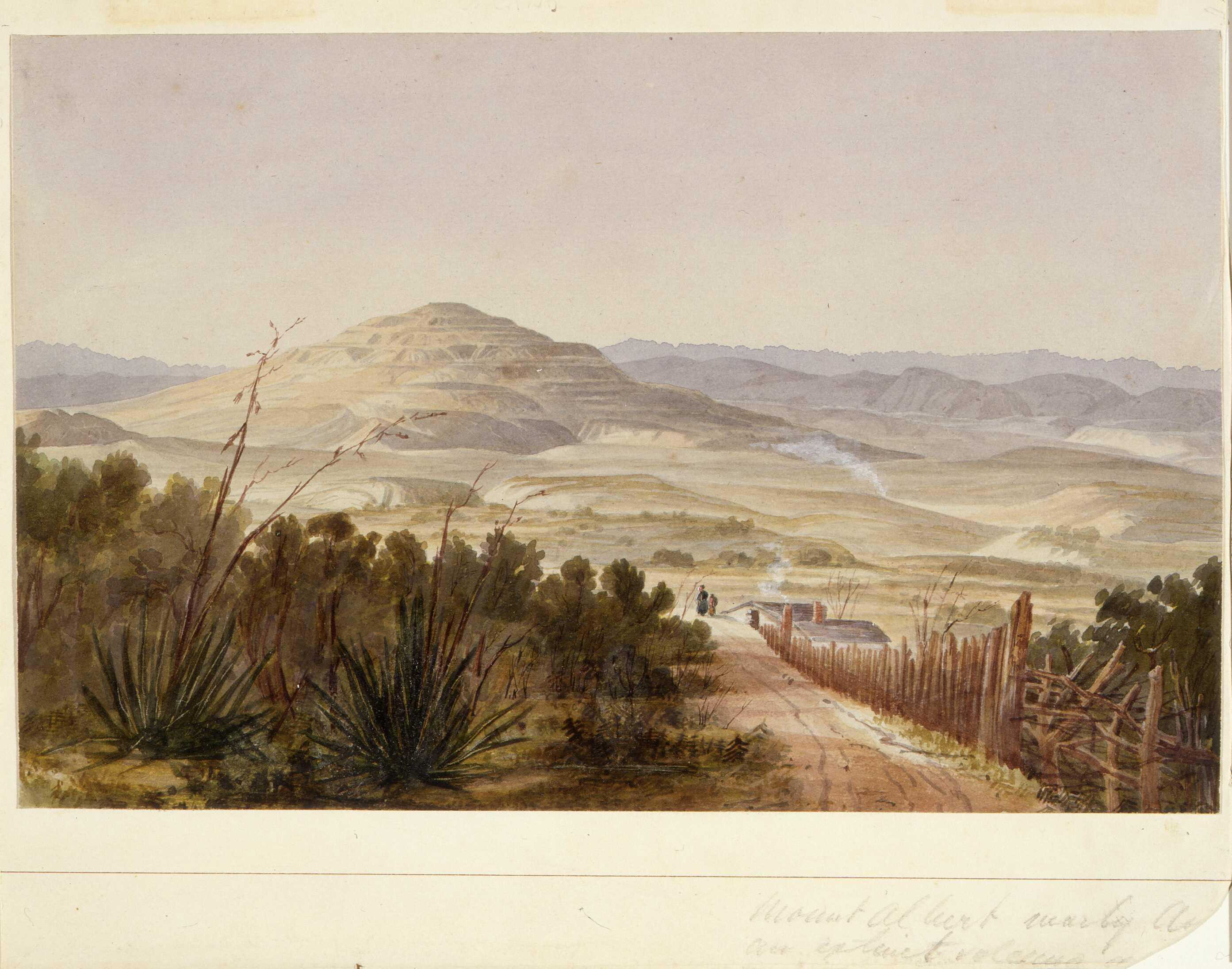
Ōwairaka / Mount Albert in an 1845 watercolour by John Guise Mitford

One of the earliest names Tāmaki Māori gave to the volcano was Te Puke o Ruarangi (The Hill of Ruarangi). A traditional story involves Ruarangi, a chief of the supernatural Patupaiarehe people, escaping a siege on the volcano through lava tunnels. Other early names include Te Ahi-kā-a-Rakataura or Te Ahi-kā-roa-a-Raka, means 'the long burning fires of Rakataura', referring to its continuous occupation by the Tainui explorer Rakataura. The name Ōwairaka refers to Wairaka, an early Māori ancestor, who was the daughter of Toroa, the captain of the Mātaatua voyaging waka. Wairaka fled to Auckland to escape an unwanted marriage, and established her people on the volcano.

During the early 18th century, the Auckland isthmus was heavily populated by the Waiohua confederation of tribes. Ōwairaka / Mount Albert was the western-most hill-top pā of Waiohua and had extensive terraces and cultivations, although not as many as Maungakiekie or Maungawhau to the east. After a conflict between Waiohua and Ngāti Whātua in the mid-18th century, the area became part of the rohe of Ngāti Whātua. Ngāti Whātua had a much smaller population than the Waiohua, and seaside areas were preferred places to live. Because of this, much of the area fell into disuse. Oakley Creek has been traditionally used by Tāmaki Māori as a source for crayfish, eels and weka. Harakeke (New Zealand flax) and raupō, which grew along the banks of the creek, were harvested here to create Māori traditional textiles.

In 1820, English priest Samuel Marsden visited the area, and climbed to the peak of Ōwairaka / Mount Albert with the paramount chief of Ngāti Whātua, Apihai Te Kawau. The mountain was named during the early colonial era after Prince Albert, husband to Queen Victoria.

=== European settlement ===
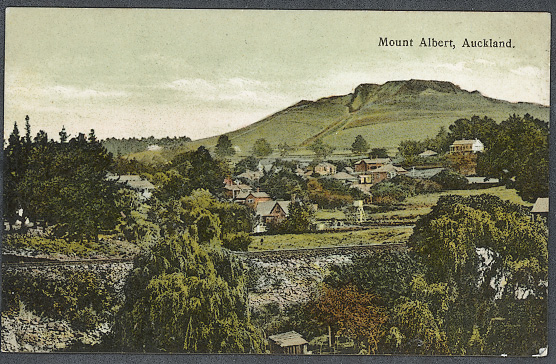
Ōwairaka / Mount Albert in a postcard, from around 1910.

On 29 June 1841, Mount Albert was sold to the Crown by Ngāti Whātua, as a part of a 12,000 acre section. The terrain of the area was rough, meaning the area saw slower development compared to other parts of the Auckland isthmus. In the 1860s, New North Road was established as road access for the area and as an alternative to the Great North Road to the north. Mount Albert area became an area of large estates for wealthy landowners, due to its proximity to Auckland township. Large houses including Alberton and Ferndale House were constructed for the families of the area.

In 1866, the Mt Albert Methodist Church was constructed. Later that year in October 1866, the Mt Albert District Highway Board, the first local government in the area, was formed to administer New North Road and surrounding areas. Tensions existed among the ratepayers of the area, primarily between the "mountain" area ratepayers and the city-side ratepayers in Eden Terrace, who believes that they were paying too high rates for a road that did not lead to any specific location. By June 1875, Eden Terrace had split from the Mt Albert District Highway Board. The first school in the area, Mt Albert School, was established in 1870 on land gifted by John McElwain, at School Road in Morningside.

Early society in Mount Albert centred around the Anglican Church, and figures such as pioneer Allan Kerr Taylor and his wife Sophia Taylor. The Kerr Taylor family renovated their home in the early 1870s, transforming Alberton into an elaborate Anglo-Indian-inspired mansion, that hosted many formal events in the area.

Mount Albert railway station opened in March 1880, connecting Morningside to Auckland city by rail, and spurring suburban growth. In the 10 years after 1881, the population of Mount Albert doubled to 1,400 people. During the latter 19th century, a quarry was established on Ōwairaka / Mount Albert, with a rail spur connecting the quarry to the North Auckland Line. Local residents had become concerned for the mountain, and petitioned the government to stop the quarry in 1895 and 1915. The Railways department chief engineer dismissed the residents' concerns. By 1905, the summit of the mountain became public land, and the quarry was eventually closed in 1928.

=== Suburban development ===
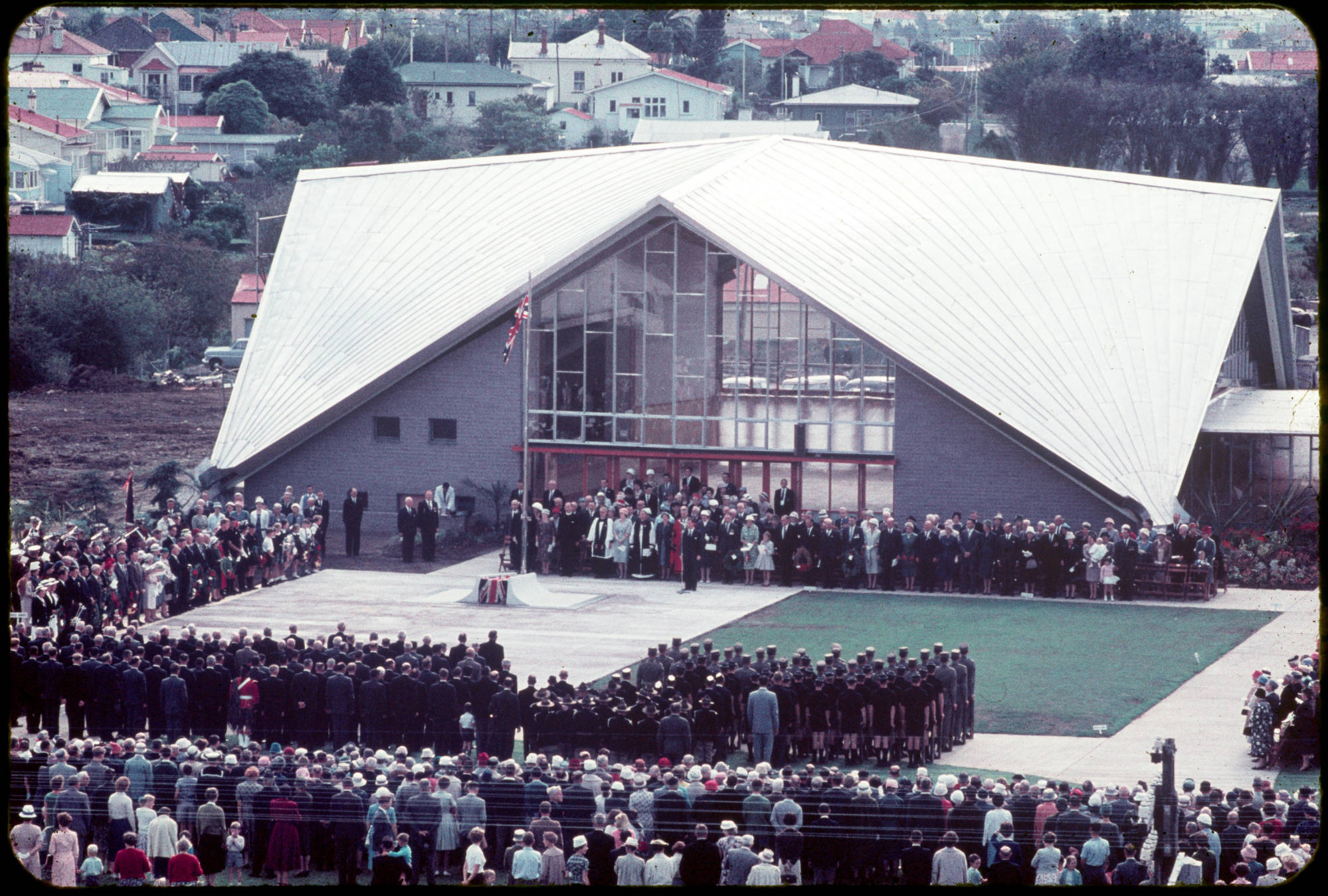
ANZAC Day services at the newly constructed Mount Albert War Memorial in 1961

By the 1910s, Mount Albert had become one of the fastest growing suburbs of Auckland. The district attracted many families from outside the Anglican community, notably many successful businessmen, who wanted to establish large family homes while still able to commute to Auckland. By 1911, the population of the area had grown to 6,666, and in 1912 the King George V Hall opened, becoming a social hub for Mount Albert. The area was still significantly more rural compared to Kingsland in the north-east, home to many dairy and poultry farms. In 1915, the Auckland tramline reached the suburb, creating suburban growth and leading to the development of the Mount Albert commercial shopping area, originally known as Ohlsen's Corner. As the Mount Albert shops developed, the area gained the name the Terminus, as at the time it was the final stop on the tramline along New North Road.

Growth in the area led to the creation of the Mount Albert Borough on 1 April 1911. The borough took our significant loans, in order to invest in the water supply for the area. Between 1901 and 1931, the population of the area surged from 2,035 to 20,600, making Mount Albert the largest borough in New Zealand. After World War II, a major housing shortage in New Zealand led to the construction of many state housing areas, including the Stewart Estate in Mount Albert.

The Mount Albert shops flourished in the 1950s and 1960s. During the 1960s, Mount Albert had a significantly older population than the surrounding areas of Auckland. In April 1961, the Mount Albert War Memorial Hall, a large modernist community centre, was constructed. Urban Māori and Pasifika communities grew in the area from the 1950s onwards, and increased in the 1970s due to the gentrification of the inner city suburbs close to the Auckland city centre. The Mount Albert shopping village began to go into a decline in the 1970s, after the establishment of the St Lukes Shopping Centre to the north.

By the 1990s, Mount Albert has developed into a multicultural centre in Auckland, with a growth in Indian, Sri Lankan and Chinese communities, in part caused by two tertiary institutes in the area: Unitec Institute of Technology and the Auckland Institute of Studies.

== Demographics ==
Mount Albert covers 5.04 km^{2} (1.95 sq mi) and had an estimated population of 13,520 as of June 2025, with a population density of 2,683 people per km^{2}.

Historical population
Year	Pop.	±% p.a.
2006	12,036	—
2013	12,228	+0.23%
2018	12,813	+0.94%
2023	12,666	−0.23%

Mount Albert had a population of 12,666 in the 2023 New Zealand census, a decrease of 147 people (−1.1%) since the 2018 census, and an increase of 438 people (3.6%) since the 2013 census. There were 6,255 males, 6,333 females and 78 people of other genders in 4,254 dwellings. 5.6% of people identified as LGBTIQ+. There were 2,373 people (18.7%) aged under 15 years, 2,790 (22.0%) aged 15 to 29, 6,078 (48.0%) aged 30 to 64, and 1,440 (11.4%) aged 65 or older.

People could identify as more than one ethnicity. The results were 63.5% European (Pākehā); 10.8% Māori; 10.1% Pasifika; 26.4% Asian; 3.7% Middle Eastern, Latin American and African New Zealanders (MELAA); and 1.7% other, which includes people giving their ethnicity as "New Zealander". English was spoken by 93.8%, Māori language by 2.2%, Samoan by 2.3%, and other languages by 24.5%. No language could be spoken by 2.0% (e.g. too young to talk). New Zealand Sign Language was known by 0.5%. The percentage of people born overseas was 35.0, compared with 28.8% nationally.

Religious affiliations were 29.9% Christian, 3.4% Hindu, 2.8% Islam, 0.5% Māori religious beliefs, 1.7% Buddhist, 0.4% New Age, 0.2% Jewish, and 1.5% other religions. People who answered that they had no religion were 54.3%, and 5.6% of people did not answer the census question.

Of those at least 15 years old, 4,545 (44.2%) people had a bachelor's or higher degree, 3,810 (37.0%) had a post-high school certificate or diploma, and 1,956 (19.0%) people exclusively held high school qualifications. 2,043 people (19.8%) earned over $100,000 compared to 12.1% nationally. The employment status of those at least 15 was that 5,562 (54.0%) people were employed full-time, 1,512 (14.7%) were part-time, and 324 (3.1%) were unemployed.

Individual statistical areas
Name	Area (km^{2})	Population	Density (per km^{2})	Dwellings	Median age	Median income
Mount Albert West	1.39	2,649	1,906	849	35.1 years	$44,300
Mount Albert North	1.51	4,143	2,774	1,437	35.1 years	$47,800
Mount Albert Central	1.31	3,564	2,721	1,188	37.7 years	$52,200
Mount Albert South	0.83	2,310	2,783	780	38.4 years	$48,700
New Zealand					38.1 years	$41,500

== Government ==
In October 1866, the Mt Albert District Highway Board, the first local government in the area, was formed to administer New North Road and the surrounding areas. In 1911, the board became the Mount Albert Borough, which elected a mayor. In 1978, Mount Albert became a city, and in 1989 it was absorbed into Auckland City. In November 2010, all cities and districts of the Auckland Region were amalgamated into a single body, governed by the Auckland Council.

Mount Albert is a part of the Albert-Eden local board area. The residents of Albert-Eden elect a local board, and two councillors from the Albert-Eden-Puketāpapa ward to sit on the Auckland Council.

Mount Albert has been part of the Mount Albert electorate since 1946, except for the 1996–99 term, when it was the Owairaka electorate. The electorate has been held by Helen White of the Labour Party since 14 October 2023.

=== Mayors (1911–1978, Mount Albert Borough Council) ===
- Michael John Coyle, 1911–1914
- Murdoch McLean, 1914–1917
- Thomas Benjamin Clay, 1917–1921
- Alfred Ferdinand Bennett, 1921–1923
- Leonard Edgar Rhodes, 1923–1931
- Wilfred Fosberry Stilwell, 1931–1933
- Raymond Ferner, 1933–1936
- Henry Albert Anderson, 1936–1959
- Francis Gordon Turner, 1959–1968
- Frank Ryan, 1968–1978

=== Mayors (1978–1989, Mount Albert City Council) ===
- Frank Ryan, 1978–1989

== Notable buildings and landmarks ==
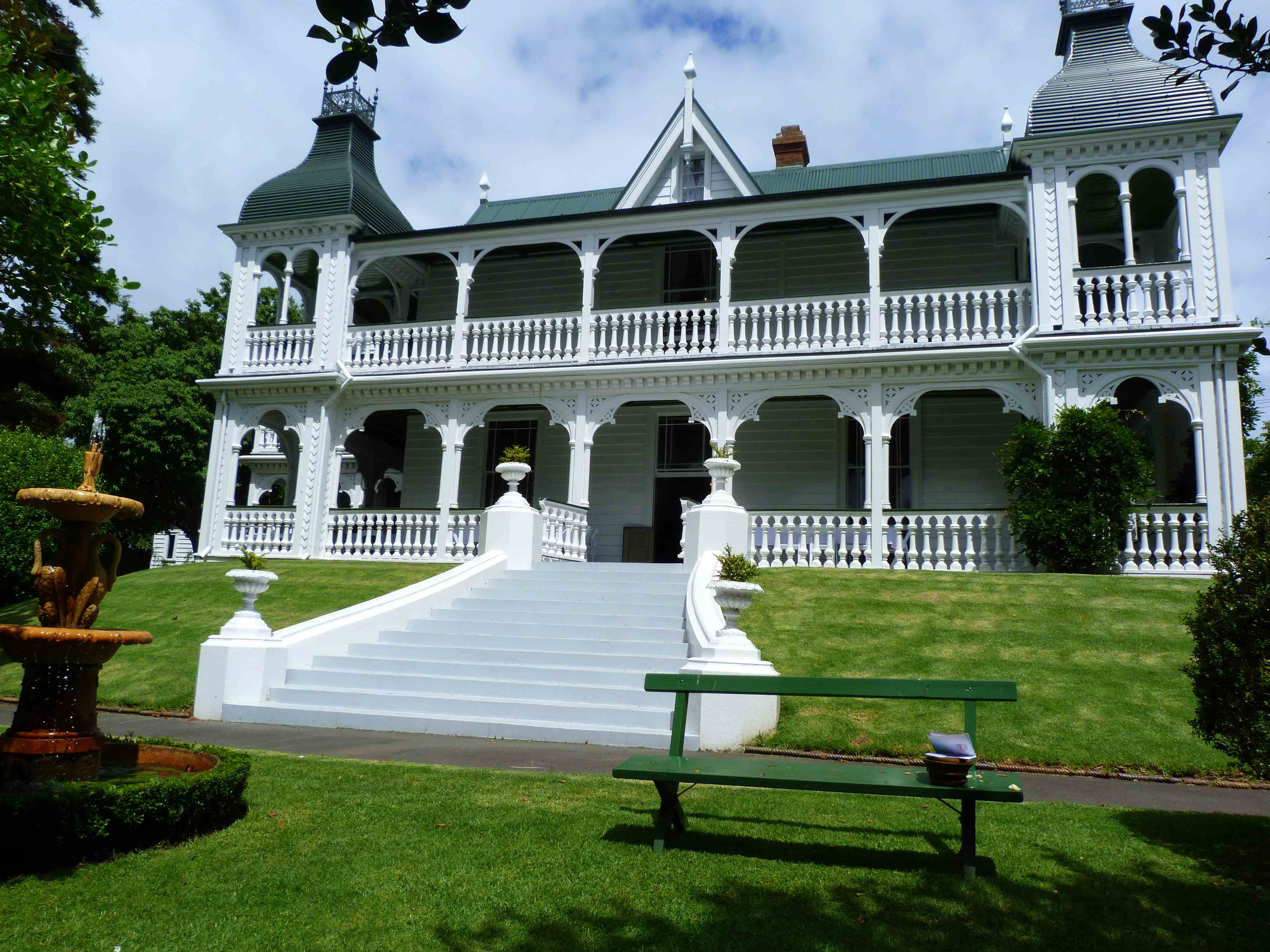
Alberton in Mount Albert

- Mt. Albert War Memorial Hall. 773 New North Road. Large modernist single span shell auditorium. Built in 1960 by the citizens of the borough of Mt. Albert in memory of those who gave their lives in the service of their country. On 24 September 1989 the last civic function of the City of Mt. Albert was held which marked the final act of 122 years of autonomous local government in Mt. Albert.
- Mount Albert Baptist Church. 732 New North Rd. Modernist church from the 1950s.
- St Mary's Catholic Church. 10 Kitenui Ave. Roman Catholic Church attendant on the adjoining churches.
- Marist School. Alberton Avenue. Roman Catholic School.
- Marist College. 31 Alberton Ave. Roman Catholic Secondary School.
- Ferndale House. 830 New North Road. A wooden Carpenter Gothic house near the main shopping area. This was built by Jonathon Tonson Garlick as a four-room cottage in 1865 and extended in 1881. His widow sold it to Mount Albert Borough Council in the 1940s. The family firm 'Tonson Garlick' manufactured furniture. The property is distinguished by several enormous Norfolk pine trees planted in the 1860s. The house is now a community venue.
- Mt Albert Methodist Church. 831 New North Road. Across the road from Ferndale is the wooden Gothic Mt Albert Methodist Church. The land for this building was donated by local resident Mr Stone.
- Mr Stone's House. 4 Alexis Avenue. Large masonry house in the Italianate style.
- Former Post Office. 911 New North Road. 1970s brick building with distinctive cylinder turrets.
- Mount Albert Railway Station. Opened in 1880, significantly upgraded 2013–16.
- Former Deluxe Cinema. 960 New North Road. 1920s building.
- Mt. Albert Presbyterian Church. 14 Mt. Albert Road.
- Alberton. 100 Mt. Albert Road. A large wooden house with distinctive turrets, was built as the residence of Allan Kerr Taylor. This two-storied wooden house has wrap-round verandahs and turrets in the Anglo-Indian style. Originally this property commanded a view towards Auckland across a thousand-acre (4 km^{2}) farm. The house was later bequeathed to the New Zealand Historic Places Trust in 1972. Claims of paranormal activity have been reported at the well-known homestead.
- Crown Research Institute. 120 Mt. Albert Rd. The main building is a modernist highrise block from the 1960s. (Former DSIR – Department of Scientific and Industrial Research)
- Mount Albert School. Primary School on Taylor's Road. School built in its current location in 1940 on the site of Wilson's Quarry.
- Mount Albert Grammar School. Alberton Avenue. Main building from the 1920s was designed by Walter Arthur Cumming this school is unusual for an urban facility as it has an agricultural department - this is the last open ground left from the Alberton Farmlands.
- Winstone House. 29 Summit Drive. Late 19th century Italianate style house located on the slopes of Mt. Albert. Built for George Winstone in Upper Symonds Street and relocated here around 1910. Winstone founded the well known Transport firm.
- Allendale Girls' Home, a state-run residential facility on Allendale Road, which operated from 1961 to 1989.
- Caughey House. 15 McLean Street. Distinctive house with turret. Moving to Mt. Albert in 1888, Andrew Caughey (of Smith & Caughey's Department Store) built this two storied wooden house on 4-acres of Edward Allen's land. Architect Arthur White designed a 16-room house where Caughey, his wife and seven children lived until 1923. The property is now run as part of the private school, Hebron Christian College
- Former St Helens Hospital. 28a Linwood Ave. Officially opened on 15 February 1968. One of a number of St Helens Hospitals built around New Zealand since 1905 and named by Prime Minister Rt Hon Richard J Seddon after the town of St Helens in Merseyside, England, near which he was born. The hospital closed on 12 June 1990 following a formal closing ceremony. The property was purchased by Auckland Institute of Studies in 1992, refurbished and reopened the following year as the institute's St Helens Campus.

=== Notable residents ===
Rugby player Sonny Bill Williams and actress Lucy Lawless both grew up in Mount Albert. Former Prime Minister Helen Clark, famous acoustician Sir Harold Marshall and the former TVNZ's Breakfast presenter Petra Bagust are current residents of the area.

New Zealand athlete, Sir Peter Snell (triple Olympic gold medalist and world mile record holder and NZ's athlete of the 20th century), was educated in and a long-time resident of Mt. Albert as was Bryan Williams, an All Black great and president of the NZRFU.

=== Education ===
Mount Albert Grammar School is a high school (years 9–13) with a roll of 3,625. Opened in 1922, it was a single-sex boys' school until 2000, when it became co-educational.

Marist College is a Catholic state-integrated girls' college (years 7–13) with a roll of 766. The college was founded in 1928, and originally called Marist Sisters College, changing its name to Marist College in 2000. Marist School is a Catholic contributing primary (years 1-6) school on the same site as Marist College. It has a roll of 267.

Mount Albert School and Gladstone Primary School are contributing primary schools (years 1-6) with rolls of 513 and 794, respectively. Te Kura Kaupapa Māori O Nga Maungarongo is a full primary school (years 1–8) with a roll of 65. It is a Māori language-immersion school.

All these schools apart from Marist College are coeducational. Rolls are as of July 2026.

Tertiary education providers in the area include Auckland Institute of Studies and Unitec.

=== Sport ===
==== Association football ====
Mount Albert is the home of association football club Metro F.C., who compete in the Lotto Sport Italia NRFL Premier, and Mount Albert-Ponsonby, who compete in the Lotto Sport Italia NRFL Division 2.

==== Rugby league ====
Mount Albert is home to both the Marist Saints and the Mount Albert Lions, who split from Marist in 1927. Both clubs compete in the Auckland Rugby League's top division, the Fox Memorial.

== Climate ==
Climate data for Mount Albert (Ōwairaka, 1991–2020 normals, extremes 1949–2008)
Month	Jan	Feb	Mar	Apr	May	Jun	Jul	Aug	Sep	Oct	Nov	Dec	Year
Record high °C (°F)	28.7 (83.7)	30.5 (86.9)	28.7 (83.7)	26.7 (80.1)	24.4 (75.9)	21.1 (70.0)	20.0 (68.0)	20.0 (68.0)	21.5 (70.7)	23.5 (74.3)	25.3 (77.5)	27.8 (82.0)	30.5 (86.9)
Mean daily maximum °C (°F)	23.5 (74.3)	24.0 (75.2)	22.7 (72.9)	20.4 (68.7)	18.0 (64.4)	15.7 (60.3)	14.9 (58.8)	15.4 (59.7)	16.7 (62.1)	17.9 (64.2)	19.6 (67.3)	21.8 (71.2)	19.2 (66.6)
Daily mean °C (°F)	19.4 (66.9)	20.0 (68.0)	18.6 (65.5)	16.4 (61.5)	14.3 (57.7)	12.1 (53.8)	11.1 (52.0)	11.6 (52.9)	12.8 (55.0)	14.3 (57.7)	15.8 (60.4)	18.0 (64.4)	15.4 (59.7)
Mean daily minimum °C (°F)	15.4 (59.7)	16.0 (60.8)	14.5 (58.1)	12.4 (54.3)	10.6 (51.1)	8.4 (47.1)	7.2 (45.0)	7.7 (45.9)	9.0 (48.2)	10.6 (51.1)	12.0 (53.6)	14.3 (57.7)	11.5 (52.7)
Record low °C (°F)	6.8 (44.2)	6.9 (44.4)	2.0 (35.6)	2.1 (35.8)	0.0 (32.0)	−2.5 (27.5)	−2.3 (27.9)	−1.3 (29.7)	0.2 (32.4)	2.2 (36.0)	4.1 (39.4)	5.2 (41.4)	−2.5 (27.5)
Average rainfall mm (inches)	73.7 (2.90)	65.6 (2.58)	90.5 (3.56)	101.8 (4.01)	108.5 (4.27)	124.1 (4.89)	146.8 (5.78)	116.0 (4.57)	103.0 (4.06)	100.8 (3.97)	89.8 (3.54)	92.6 (3.65)	1,213.2 (47.78)
Source: NIWA (rainfall 1981–2010)

== Transport ==
Mount Albert is well served by trains and buses, and is only 7 km from Auckland's CBD. The railway station is centrally located, near the intersection of New North Road and Mt. Albert/Carrington Road. Mount Albert Railway Station is a part of the East West Line; trains run regularly between Swanson, Manukau and the City Centre.

The centre of all the shopping and business activities in the suburb of Mt. Albert is New North Road, roughly between Richardson Road and Lloyd Avenue.

== Bibliography ==
- Dunsford, Deborah (2016). Mt Albert Then and Now: a History of Mt Albert, Morningside, Kingsland, St Lukes, Sandringham and Owairaka. Auckland: Mount Albert Historical Society. ISBN 978-0-473-36016-0. OCLC 964695277. Wikidata Q117189974.
- Reidy, Jade (2013). Not Just Passing Through: the Making of Mt Roskill (2nd ed.). Auckland: Puketāpapa Local Board. ISBN 978-1-927216-97-2. OCLC 889931177. Wikidata Q116775081.
