= New North Road, New Zealand =

Street in Auckland, New Zealand

New North Road
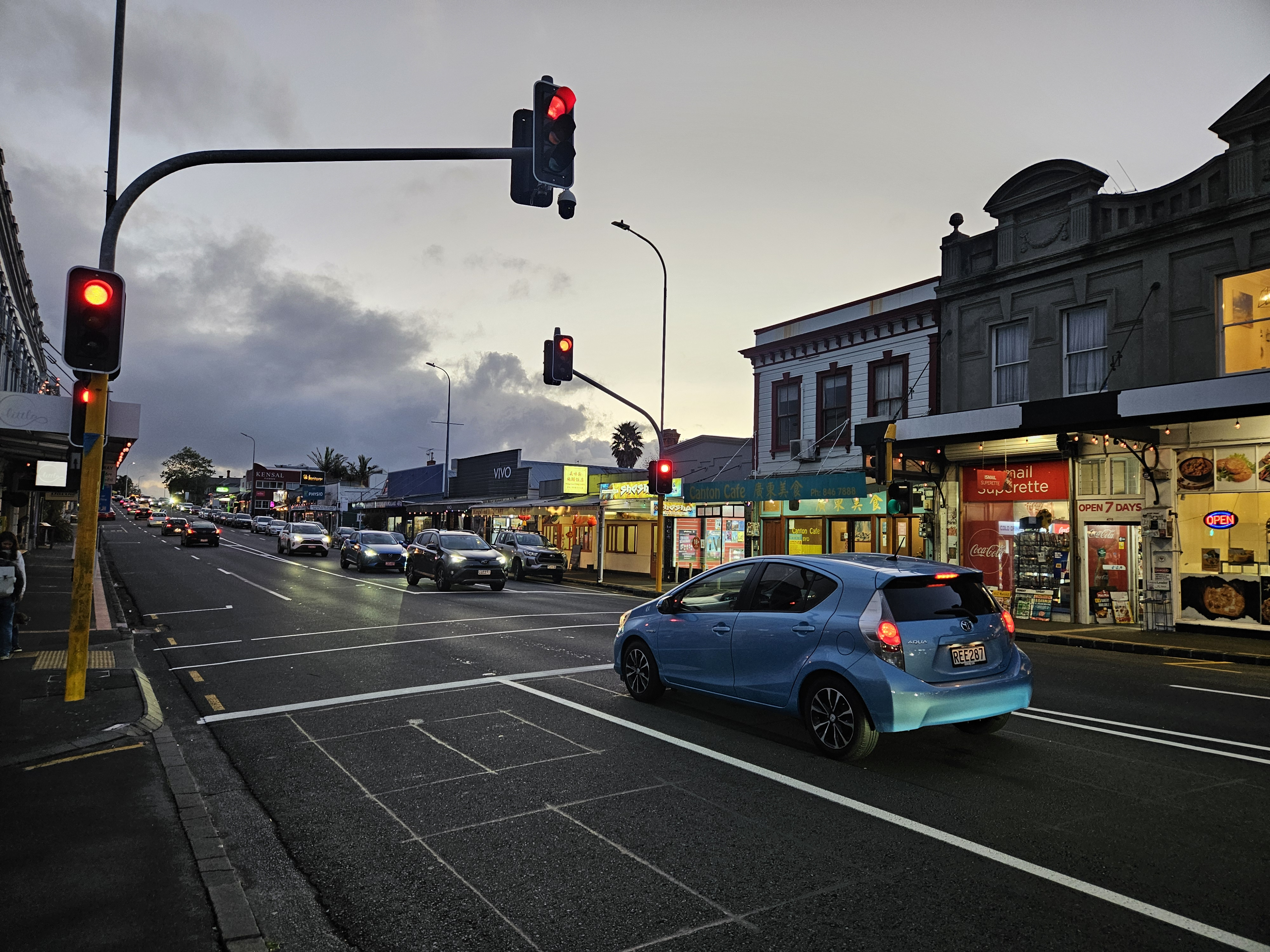
- New North Road at Kingsland
- Location: Eden Terrace, Kingsland, Morningside, Mount Albert, Avondale
- Coordinates: 36.8657°S 174.7695°E
- West end: Blockhouse Bay Road; St Jude Street
- East end: Symonds Street; Mount Eden Road

New North Road is a street in the central and western Auckland isthmus, New Zealand, connecting Upper Symonds Street in Eden Terrace to Avondale. The road runs parallel to Great North Road, located to the north, and crosses Dominion Road, the Western Line at Morningside and runs above the Waterview Tunnel section of the Southwestern Motorway at Mount Albert.

== History ==
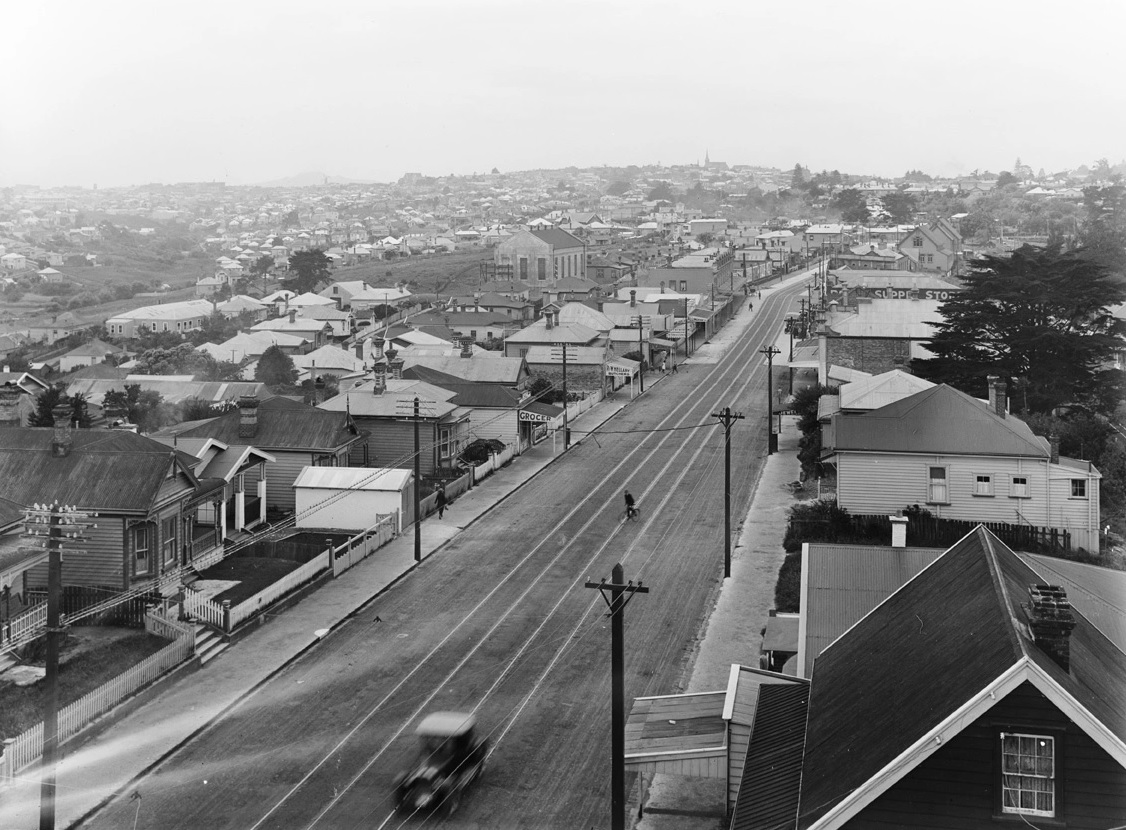
New North Road in 1923, seen from Mount Albert fire bell looking towards Kingsland

The New North Road area has been settled by Tāmaki Māori since the archaic period of Māori history. Traditional stories involve many of the lava caves located around the former swampland of Kingsland, known as Ngā Anawai, and the lava caves of Ōwairaka / Mount Albert. During the early 18th century, the Auckland isthmus was heavily populated by the Waiohua confederation of tribes. Ōwairaka / Mount Albert was the western-most hill-top pā of Waiohua and had extensive terraces and cultivations, although not as many as Maungakiekie or Maungawhau to the east. After a conflict between Waiohua and Ngāti Whātua in the mid-18th century, the New North Road area became part of the rohe of Ngāti Whātua. As Ngāti Whātua had a much smaller population than the Waiohua and preferred to live near the coast, much of the inland area fell into disuse. On 29 June 1841, the Mount Albert area was sold to the Crown by Ngāti Whātua, as a part of a 12,000 acre section. The terrain of the area was rough, meaning the area saw slower development compared to other parts of the Auckland isthmus.

The modern road began life as a rough track in the 1850s, known as the Whau Road. In December 1853, a survey was commissioned to build the route, however by January 1854 the proposed route was scrapped, due to opponents of the scheme highlighting that the allocated funds for the programme could only be spent on road construction, when land also needed to be purchased from early Mount Albert landowners Allan Kerr Taylor and George Bray. By 1855, Auckland settlers petitioned the Auckland Provincial Council for funding, as many properties had no road access, limiting growth in the area.

In May 1864, a meeting was held at Whau School (modern Avondale Primary School) to discuss the creation of a new Great North Road (then the major route west from Auckland township), to address the issues caused by a lack of roading. By September 1864, the treasurer of the Auckland Province announced that the Whau Road Extension was surveyed, and due for construction. In 1865, allotments for the new village of Morningside were sold.

In October 1866, the Mt Albert District Highway Board was formed, to collect rates to administer and develop New North Road. Tensions formed between two groups of ratepayers in the highway district: the city-side ratepayers at Eden Terrace, and the mountain-side ratepayers in the rural west, with the former believing that they paid too high rates for a road that "led nowhere". In June 1875, the Eden Terrace Highway Board was formed, splitting the city-side area of the road from the rural.

The New North Road corridor grew as a suburban area between the 1900s and the 1930s, due to the Auckland tramlines. The tramline opened at Kingsland in 1903, followed by Morningside in 1912, Mount Albert in 1915 and eventually Owairaka in 1936.

In the 1950s, New North Road north-east of Kingsland was transformed into an industrial and commercial area. During this period, Dominion Road was proposed as a site for a new motorway. While the motorway never progressed, a large flyover interchange was constructed at the intersection of Dominion Road and New North Road in the early 1960s, which removed extensive areas of housing and commercial buildings.

== Notable locations ==
- The Sri Radha Krishna Mandir Temple and the adjacent Mahatma Gandhi Centre in Eden Terrace, major centres for the Indian and Hindu communities of Auckland.
- Kingsland town centre, including the Kingsland railway station
- Morningside town centre, including the Morningside railway station
- St Luke's Church, a historic Anglican church
- Mount Albert War Memorial Reserve, which includes Rocket Park and the Mount Albert War Memorial Hall
- Alice Wylie Reserve
- Ferndale House, a historic residence and community centre in Mount Albert
- Mount Albert town centre, including the Mount Albert railway station

== Gallery ==
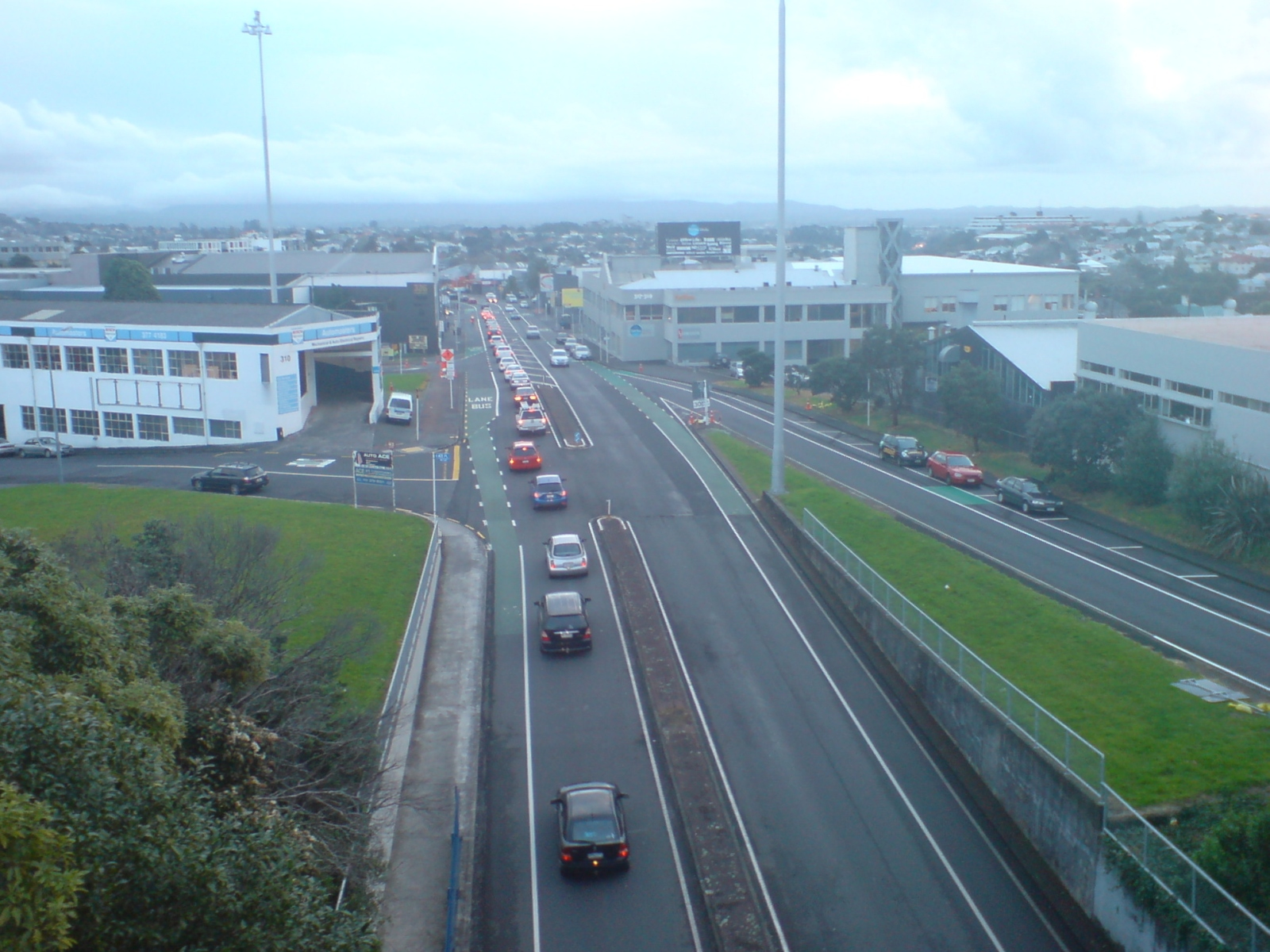
Intersection of New North Road and Dominion Road, looking west

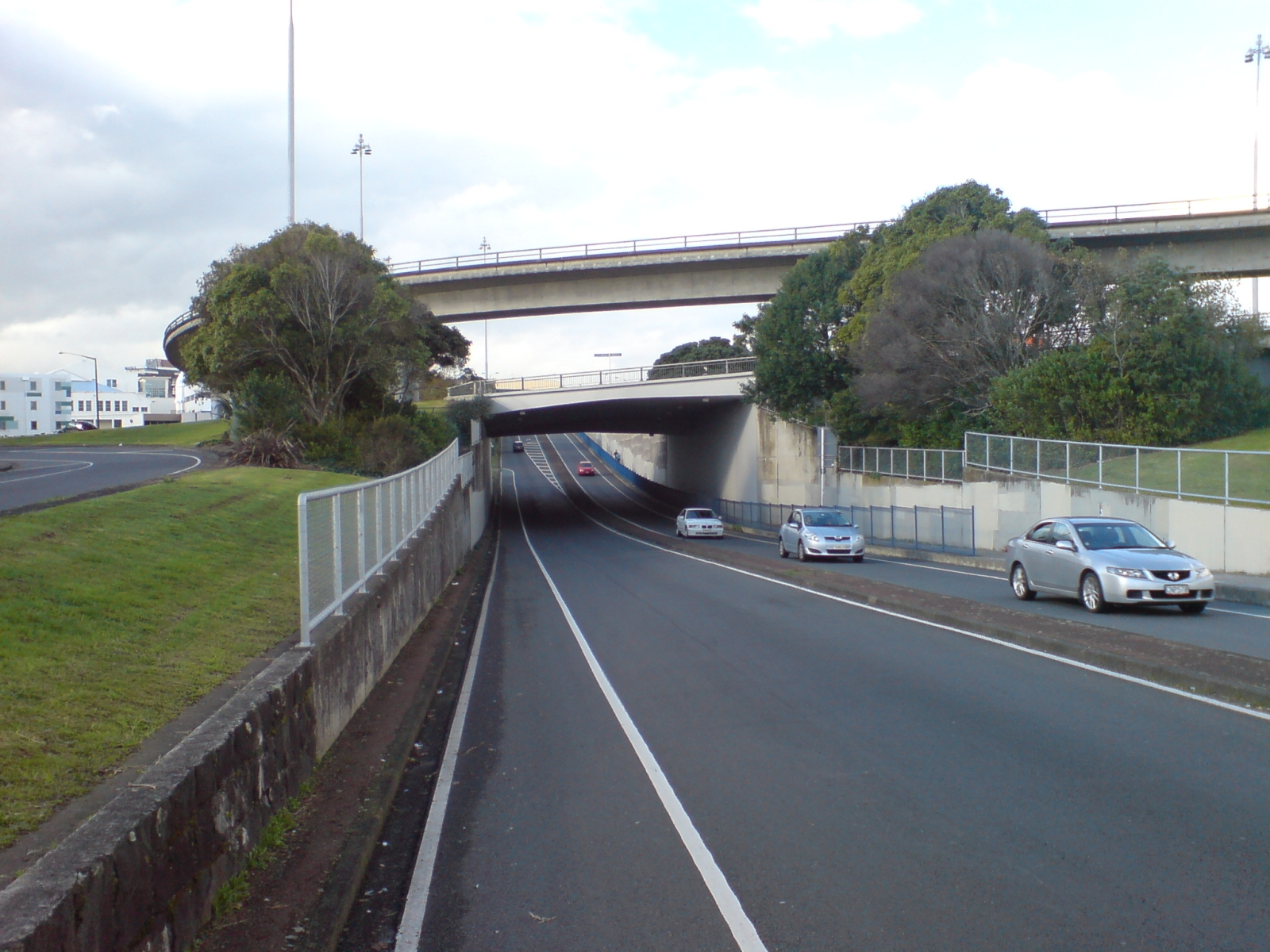
The New North Road underpass, underneath Dominion Road

Morningside town centre

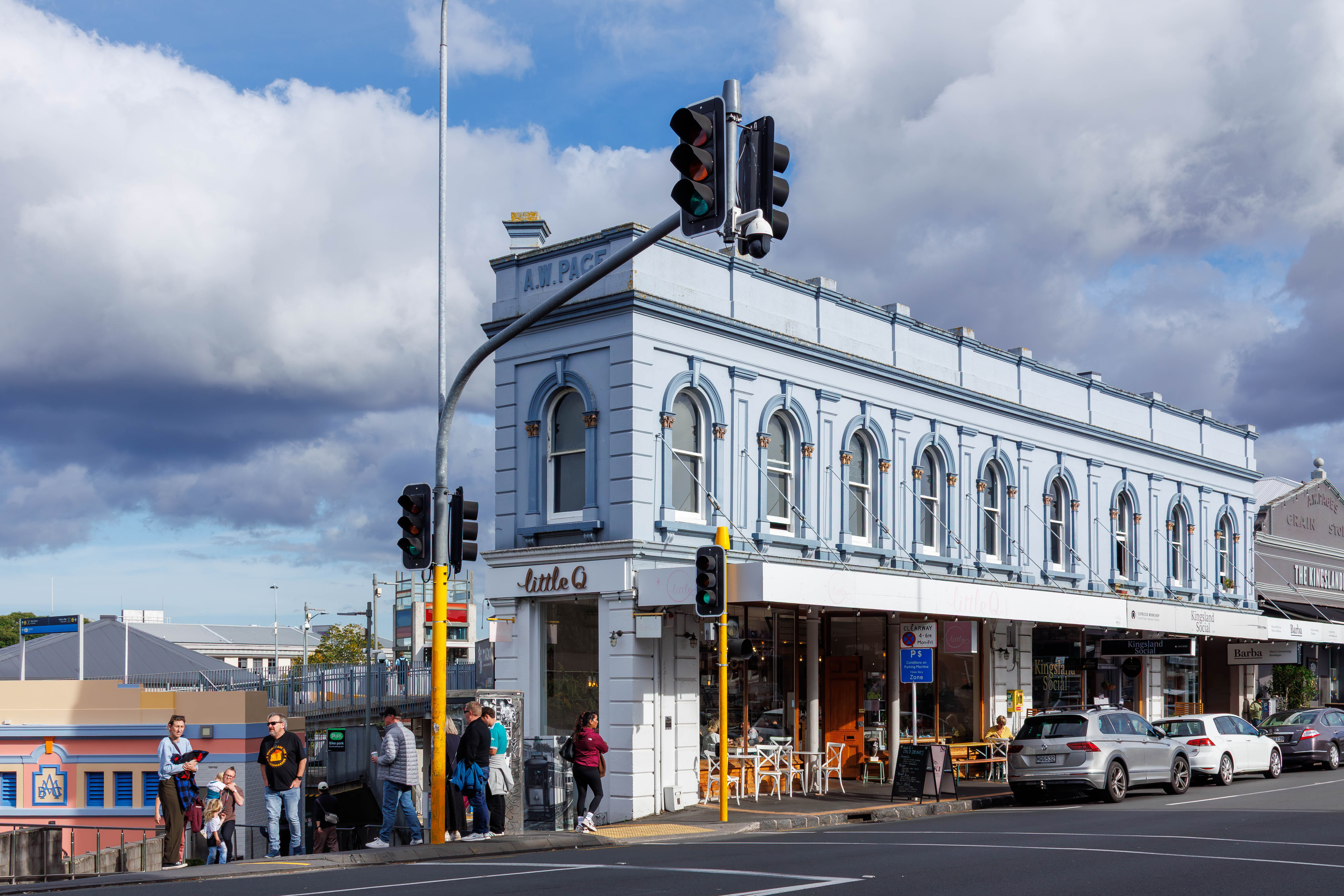
The A. W. Page building in Kingsland

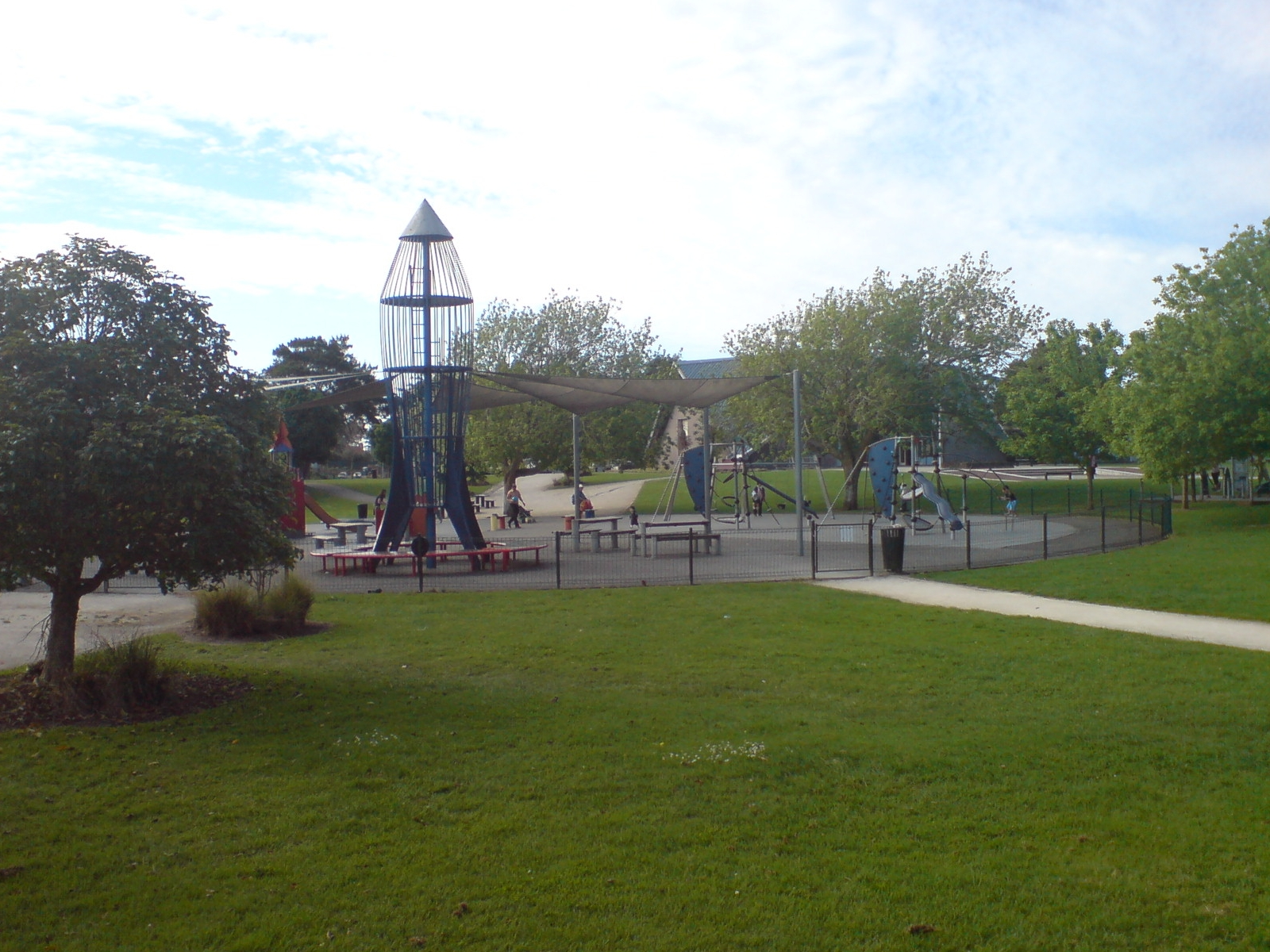
Rocket Park

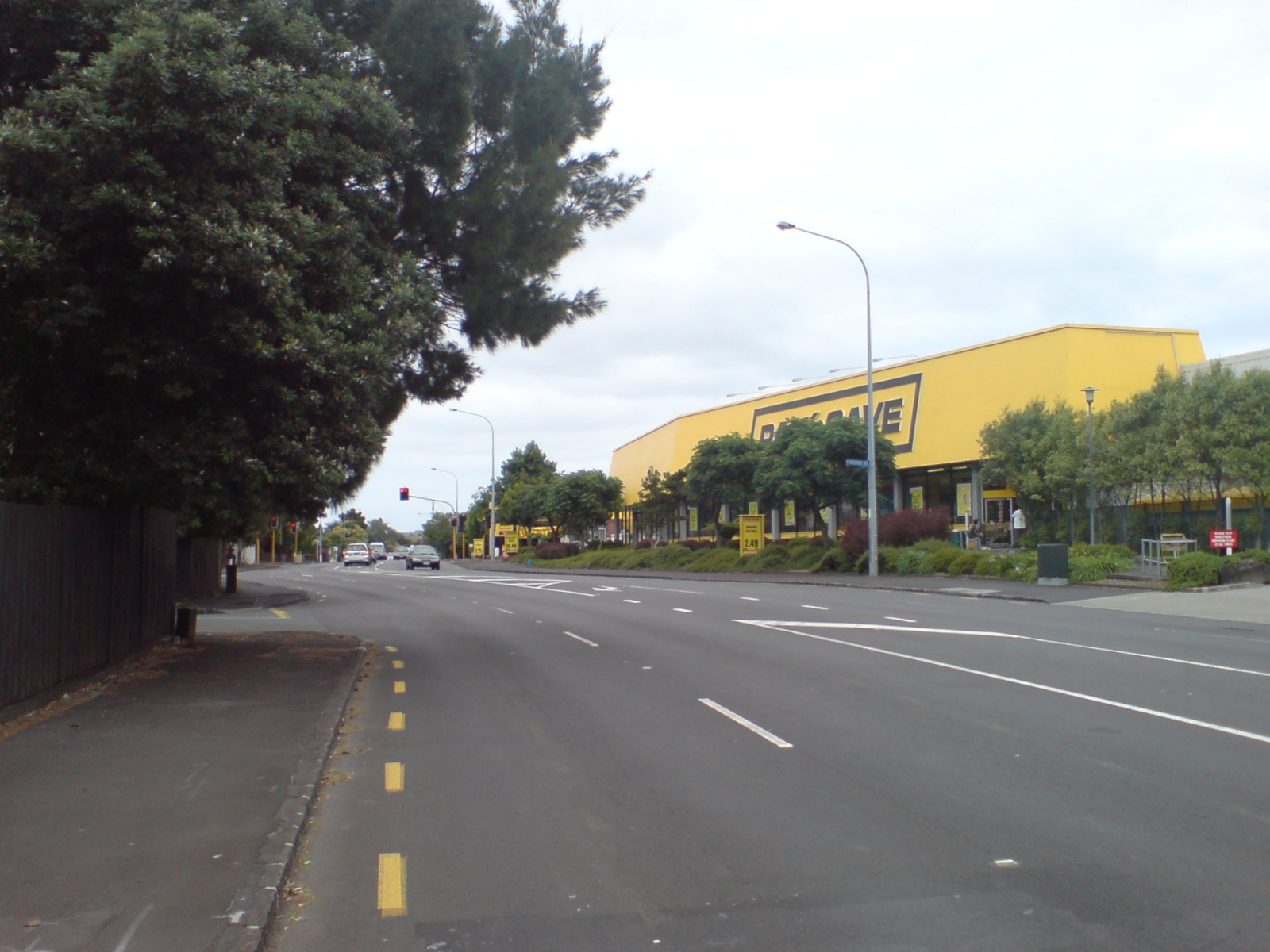
Pak'nSave Mount Albert

== Bibliography ==
- Dunsford, Deborah (2016). Mt Albert Then and Now: a History of Mt Albert, Morningside, Kingsland, St Lukes, Sandringham and Owairaka. Auckland: Mount Albert Historical Society. ISBN 978-0-473-36016-0. OCLC 964695277. Wikidata Q117189974.
