= Mount Albert School =

Coordinates: 36.878°S 174.731°E

Mount Albert Primary School

Location
- 6 Sainsbury Road; Mount Albert; Auckland, 1025

Information
- Type: State co-educational primary (Year 1-6)
- Motto: Honour before all
- Established: 1870
- Ministry of Education Institution no.: 1381
- Principal: Marian Caulfield
- Enrolment: 513
- Socio-economic decile: 6
- Website: mtalbertprimary.school.nz

Mount Albert Primary School is a primary school in the suburb of Mount Albert, Auckland, New Zealand that caters for boys and girls from Year 1 to Year 6. it currently has a roll of 513 and its current principal is Marian Caulfield. The school is often referred to by students and parents simply as MAPS.

== School history ==
The original school was built in 1870 on one acre of farmland donated by Mr McElwain to the Auckland Education Board. The first school building was built by local residents using their own money. The school went through several expansions on the original site at 13 School Road, Kingsland, New Zealand, before the school was moved to its current site on Sainsbury Road in 1940. The original school building still stands but is in a state of disrepair. A new school building was opened in June 2015 by Education Minister Hekia Parata.

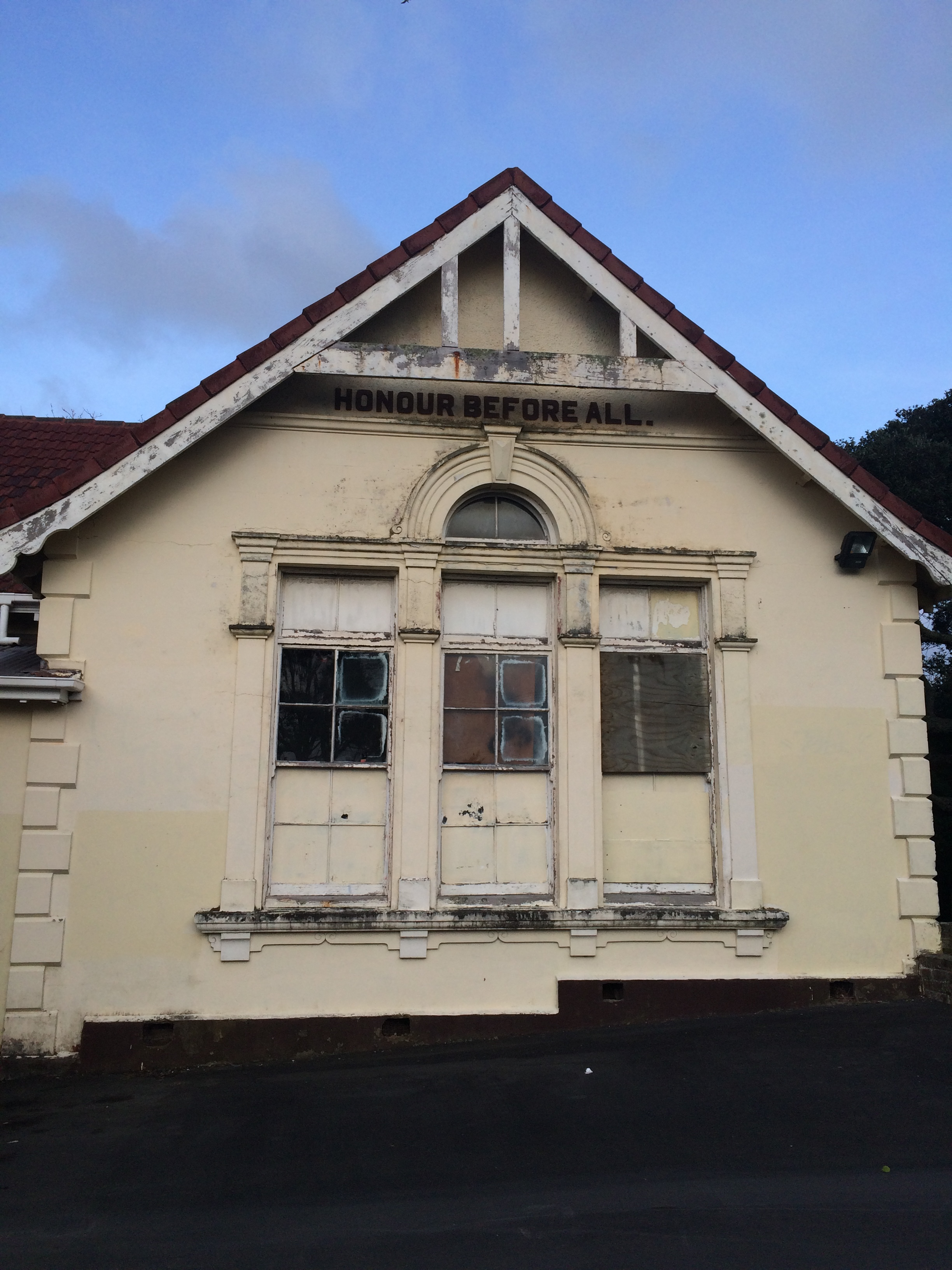
The old Mount Albert Primary School building, on School Road, Kingsland, Auckland

== Mt Albert School principals ==
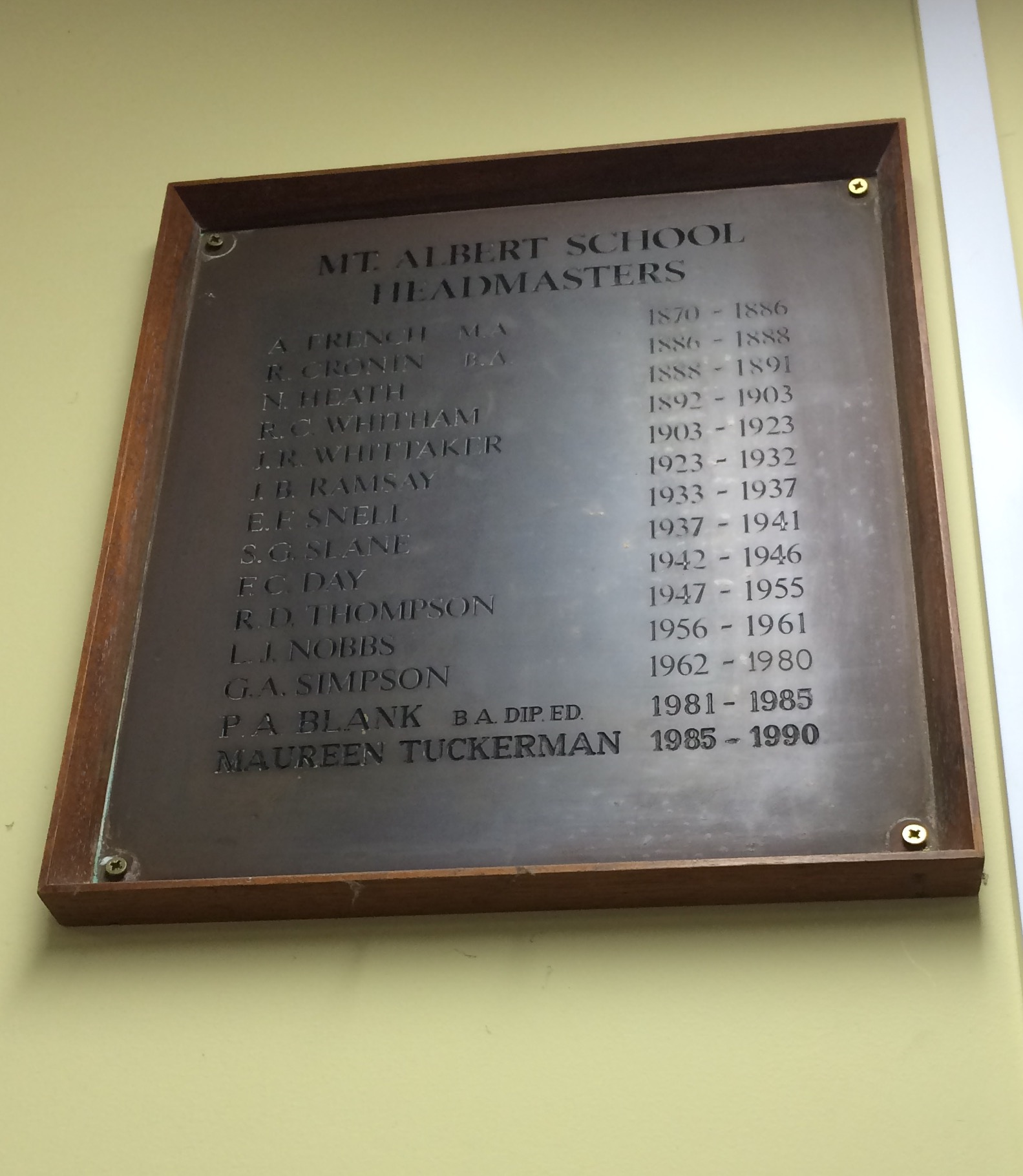
Plaque in Mt Albert School office

Nane	From	To
A French M.A	1870	1886
R. Cronin B.A	1886	1888
N. Heath	1888	1891
F.C Whitham	1892	1903
J.R Whittaker	1903	1923
J.B Ramsay	1923	1932
E.F Snell	1933	1937
S.G Slane	1937	1941
F.C Day	1942	1946
R.D Thompson	1947	1955
L.J Nobbs	1956	1961
G.A Simpson	1962	1980
P.A Blank B.A. DIP. ED.	1981	1985
Maureen Tuckerman	1985	1990
Enosa Auva'a	1991	2017
Marian Caulfield	2017	

== Notable students ==
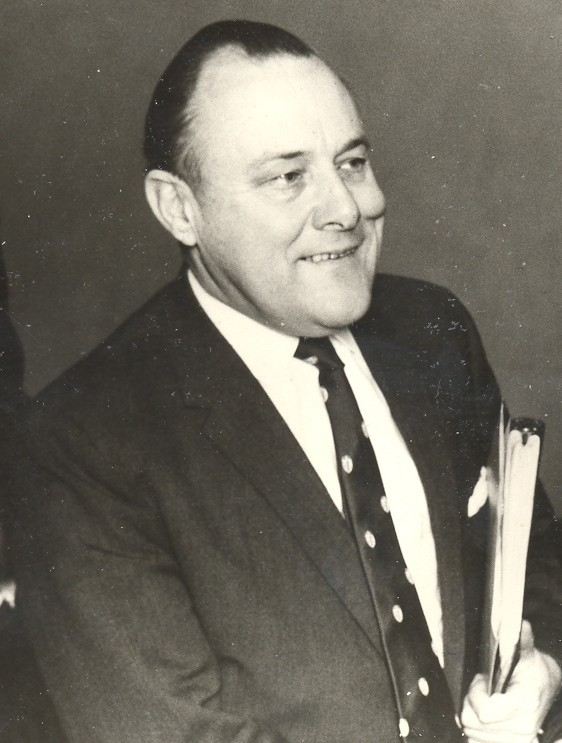
Robert Muldoon, 26 June 1969

- Robert Muldoon - New Zealand Prime Minister, 1975-1984
