= Ferndale House =

Historic house in Auckland, New Zealand

General information
- Location: 830 New North Road and Alexis Avenue, Mt Albert, Auckland, New Zealand
- Coordinates: 36°52′57″S 174°43′10″E
- Opened: 1865

Heritage New Zealand – Category 2
- Designated: 4 April 1983
- Reference no.: 676

Ferndale House is a 19th-century house in Mount Albert, Auckland, New Zealand, which is listed by Heritage New Zealand as a Category II structure. The house was built in the 1860s for the Garlick family, major figures in the Methodist community in Mount Albert, later becoming a hub for the Plunket Society in the 1940s and a community centre.

== History ==
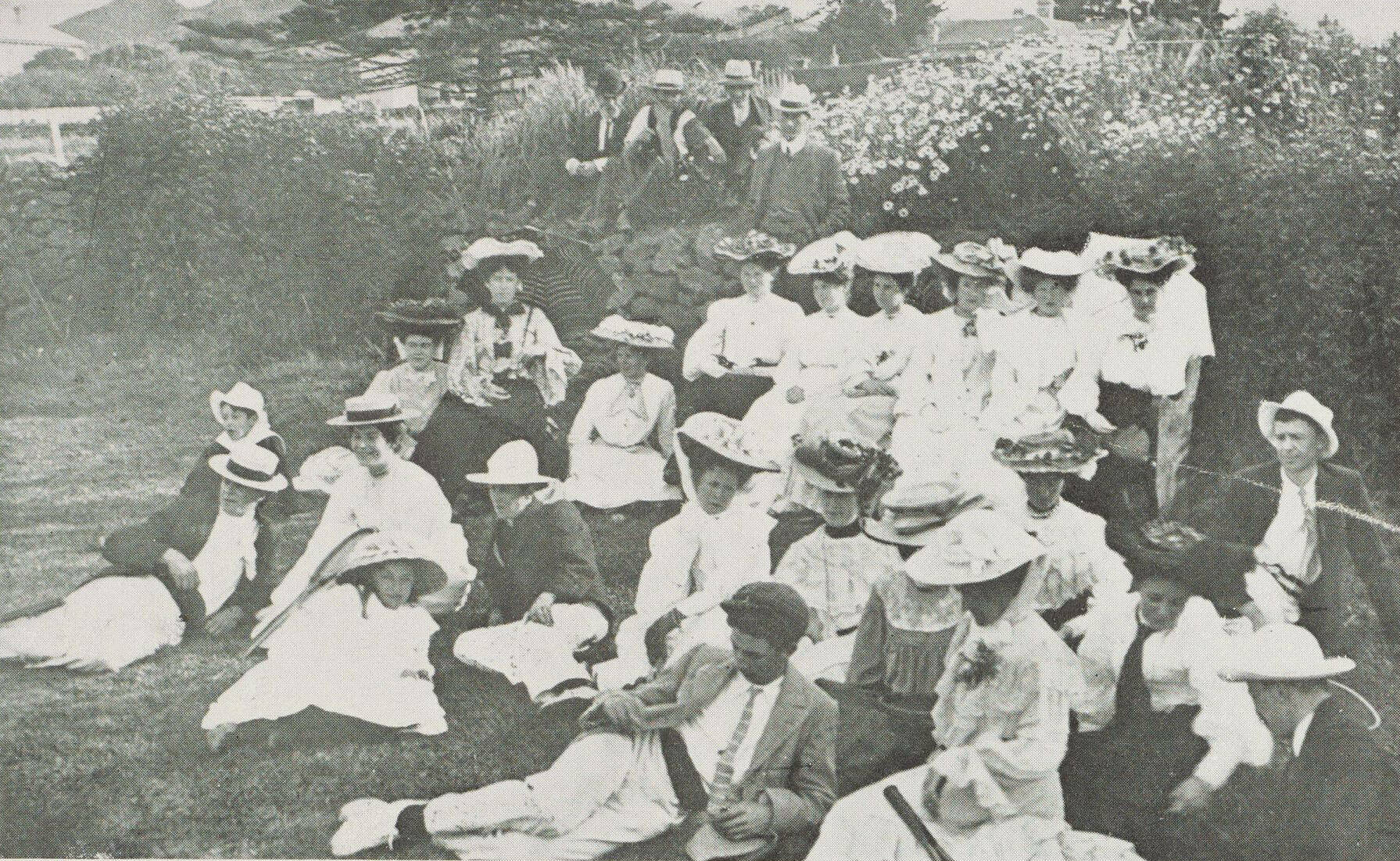
A group of women playing lawn bowls at Ferndale in 1905

The land where the house lies was bought by pioneer Robert Hunt in 1845. In 1865, Anne Garlick and her husband, Jonathan Tonson Garlick wed and purchased land on Hunt's former section along New North Road, together having five children. Their home was a small cottage on the site, which they called Fern Villa. The Garlicks were central figures in the Methodist community of Mount Albert, regularly hosting major social events in their home. In 1870, the house was greatly enlarged, and by 1881 the family had decided to rename their home Ferndale.

The Garlick family allowed many local clubs and institutions to operate from their home. In November 1894, the Mt Albert Lawn Tennis Club formed at Ferndale, followed by a bowling club in 1897, and during the Great Depression and World War II, the Ferndale Women's Club regularly hosted social events at Ferndale. In 1947, Anne Garlick died, after which the Plunket Society and local play centre groups lobbied the Mount Albert Borough Council to purchase the house, so that it would continue to be used as a community space. The council agreed, and the Ferndale House was opened on 17 September 1947.

The house was restored in the 1980s, during which Plunket and the kindergarten were rehoused. The house was formally reopened on 22 June 1985. The Auckland Council operates the house as a community venue, and Ferndale Kindergarten operates from the grounds of the Ferndale House.

== Bibliography ==
- Dunsford, Deborah (2016). Mt Albert Then and Now: a History of Mt Albert, Morningside, Kingsland, St Lukes, Sandringham and Owairaka. Auckland: Mount Albert Historical Society. ISBN 978-0-473-36016-0. OCLC 964695277. Wikidata Q117189974.
