= Eden Terrace =

- Suburb
- Galbraith's Alehouse
- Interactive map of Eden Terrace
- Coordinates: 36°52′02″S 174°45′31″E
- Country: New Zealand
- City: Auckland
- Local authority: Auckland Council
- Electoral ward: Albert-Eden-Puketāpapa ward
- Local board: Waitematā Local Board
- Established: 1860s

Area
  - Land: 59 ha (150 acres)

Population (June 2025)
  - Total: 3,440
  - Density: 5,800/km^{2} (15,000/sq mi)

Grey Lynn	Auckland CBD	Grafton
Arch Hill	Eden Terrace	Newmarket
Kingsland	Mount Eden, Eden Valley

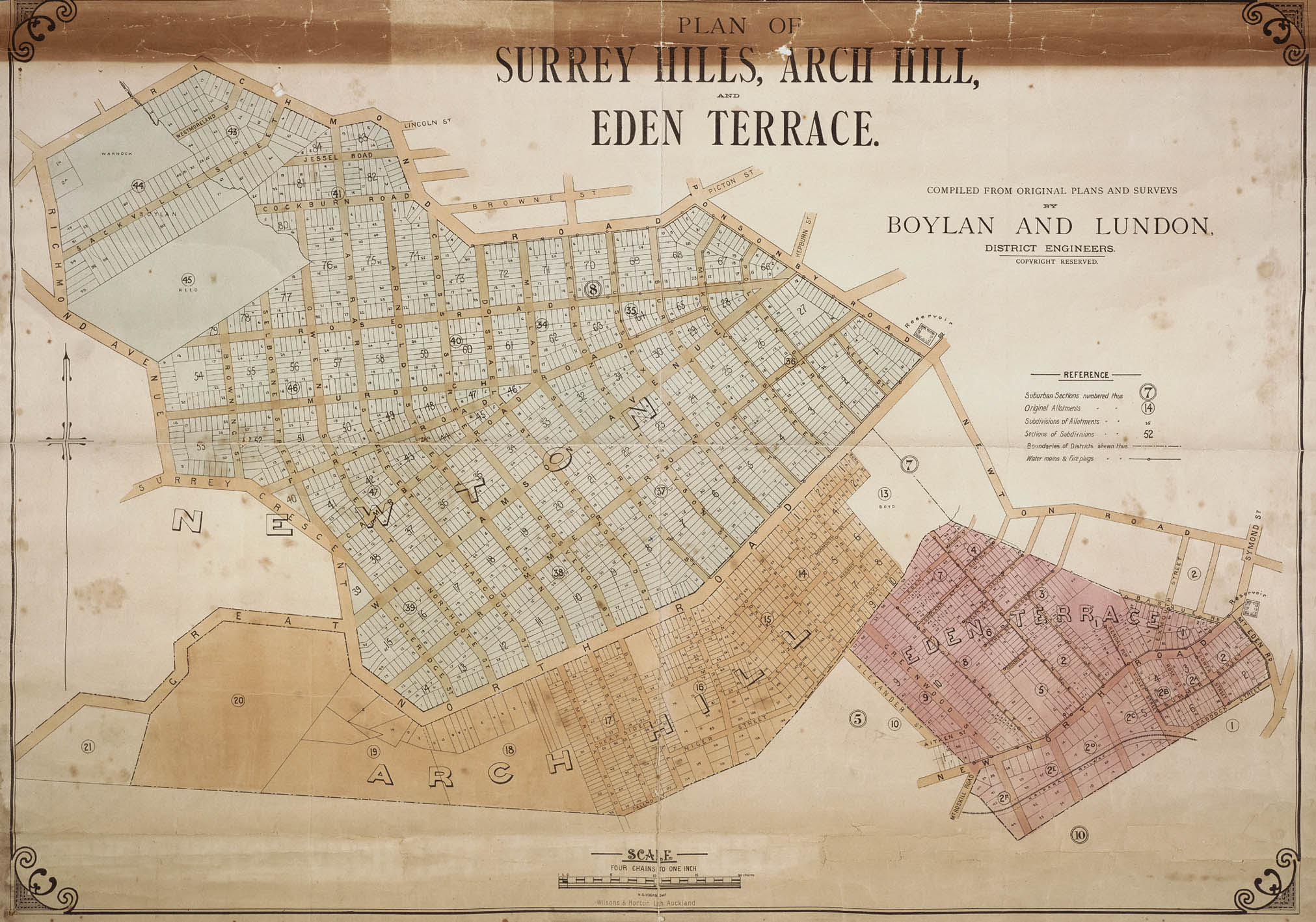
Plan of Surrey Hills, Arch Hill and Eden Terrace, circa 1880s

Looking east from Arch Hill towards Eden Terrace, circa 1860–1880

Eden Terrace is an inner city suburb of Auckland, located 2 km south of the Auckland CBD, in the North Island of New Zealand. Eden Terrace is one of Auckland's oldest suburbs, and also one of the smallest.

Eden Terrace is under the governance of the Auckland Council.

== History ==
David Burn (c.1799 – 1875) was the first landowner in Eden Terrace to start subdividing farmland up for residential development. In 1863, he became the first editor of The New Zealand Herald (then called the Herald). He was also a playwright, journalist, and author of the first Australian drama to be performed on stage, The Bushrangers.

Scottish-born Burn immigrated to Auckland in 1847 and in 1849 bought land at the top of Symonds Street from William Smellie Graham, who in turn had bought the land from the Crown in December 1848. Burn built his house, Cotele, on this property. The house was located at the intersection of Symonds Street, Mount Eden Road and New North Road, enjoying views north to the harbour and west to the Waitakeres. He later moved to Emily Place and leased Cotele to various tenants.

In 1861 then again in 1863, Burn subdivided the land around Cotele into hundreds of small building allotments and sold them off at a considerable profit. New roads appeared as the land was subdivided; Burn was always "warmly attached to the navy and nautical matters" which could explain his choice of road names: Basque; Dundonald; and Exmouth – all associated with famous sea battles.

David Burn died in 1875, "in comfortable circumstances" thanks to selling the Cotele allotments at such high prices.

In 1875 the Eden Terrace Road District was formed from the Mount Albert Highway District. In 1915 Eden Terrace was annexed by the City of Auckland.

The early Victorian house built by Burn, Cotele, was replaced around the year 1900 by a two storied Edwardian Arts & Crafts house. In the 1930s one storied shops were built on the frontyard of the house. The wooden house was just visible above the shops from Symonds Street until it burnt down in 1995. In the 2000s the site was completely cleared of buildings. It was proposed that this was to be the entry to the new Underground Railway Station but in 2014 it was announced that the Newton Station was to be dropped from the Central Rail Link (CRL).

== Demographics ==
The statistical unit of Eden Terrace, which also covers Newton, but does not cover the area west of Dominion Road, covers 0.59 km^{2} (0.23 sq mi) and had an estimated population of 3,440 as of June 2025, with a population density of 5,831 people per km^{2}.

Historical population
Year	Pop.	±% p.a.
2006	2,898	—
2013	2,799	−0.50%
2018	3,036	+1.64%
2023	3,186	+0.97%
The 2006 population is for a larger area of 0.84 km^{2}. Source:

Eden Terrace had a population of 3,186 in the 2023 New Zealand census, an increase of 150 people (4.9%) since the 2018 census, and an increase of 387 people (13.8%) since the 2013 census. There were 1,680 males, 1,455 females and 48 people of other genders in 1,614 dwellings. 14.0% of people identified as LGBTIQ+. The median age was 33.0 years (compared with 38.1 years nationally). There were 171 people (5.4%) aged under 15 years, 1,038 (32.6%) aged 15 to 29, 1,842 (57.8%) aged 30 to 64, and 135 (4.2%) aged 65 or older.

People could identify as more than one ethnicity. The results were 57.0% European (Pākehā); 8.9% Māori; 4.9% Pasifika; 34.0% Asian; 6.8% Middle Eastern, Latin American and African New Zealanders (MELAA); and 2.0% other, which includes people giving their ethnicity as "New Zealander". English was spoken by 95.6%, Māori language by 2.3%, Samoan by 0.7%, and other languages by 36.3%. No language could be spoken by 1.3% (e.g. too young to talk). New Zealand Sign Language was known by 0.3%. The percentage of people born overseas was 51.7, compared with 28.8% nationally.

Religious affiliations were 22.8% Christian, 5.6% Hindu, 2.7% Islam, 0.5% Māori religious beliefs, 2.1% Buddhist, 0.8% New Age, 0.5% Jewish, and 2.2% other religions. People who answered that they had no religion were 58.7%, and 4.2% of people did not answer the census question.

Of those at least 15 years old, 1,638 (54.3%) people had a bachelor's or higher degree, 969 (32.1%) had a post-high school certificate or diploma, and 402 (13.3%) people exclusively held high school qualifications. The median income was $62,000, compared with $41,500 nationally. 663 people (22.0%) earned over $100,000 compared to 12.1% nationally. The employment status of those at least 15 was that 2,124 (70.4%) people were employed full-time, 333 (11.0%) were part-time, and 87 (2.9%) were unemployed.

== Buildings of interest ==
- Orange Coronation Ballroom. Architect: Arthur Sinclair O'Connor. Located at the top of Newton Road, the Orange is an interesting minor gem of interwar stripped classicism. The Orange was built in 1923 by the Auckland Orange Hall Society, a branch of Irish Protestants in Auckland. Dances and public entertainment were held there up until 1987. Dame Kiri te Kanawa performed there, early in her career. Its sprung dance floor is still reputed to be one of the best in Auckland.
- Edinburgh Castle Hotel. Corner of Symonds Street and Newton Road. Built in 1865, it is an example of one of the simpler versions of the Italianate style. Surface plaster hides its original wooden construction. An Auckland Trotting Association was formed at a meeting held in the Edinburgh Castle on 21 May 1890. This club changed their name to the Onslow Trotting Club a little later, part of the origins of the Auckland Trotting Club and their racing today at Alexandra Park. In 2026 musician Neil Finn bought the hotel with the intention of creating a wellness retreat.
- Pierce Bldgs – corner of Symonds Street and Khyber Pass Road. Brick group of retail shops from around 1912 built for Eleanor Piece, the widow of Mr George Patrick Pierce who had died in 1891. George Pierce had been a church warden for the nearby Church of the Holy Sepulchre. Mrs Pierce died in 1912. The family sold the property in 1944 to Grace Brothers Ltd, a Furnishing Company.
- Former Post Office building. An Art Deco structure from the 1930s.
- Former Eden Vine Hotel. Corner of Mt Eden Road, New North Road and Upper Symonds Street. The Eden Vine Hotel was built for William Galbraith in 1868. It lost its licence in 1905 and closed. For most of the 20th century this was occupied by an Undertakers Firm.
- Former Grafton Public Library – 2 Mt Eden Road. neoclassical building from 1917 by Edward Bartley. This was the first branch of the Auckland Public Library System - it was closed in the early 1990s and has subsequently become a Pub called Galbraith's.
- Pumping Station – 4 Mt Eden Road. 1950s modernist building by Tibor Donner. Donner's first substantial design for the Auckland City Council was this reinforced concrete pumping station designed to draw water from the Hūnua main supply to the Mt. Eden reservoir. Completed early in 1948, the building's incised v-cut painted plaster finish exhibits the architect's characteristic precise and deliberate detailing. These concerns are further revealed in the tapering exterior hoods (now sawn off), sills, doorways, windows, stairways, glazed internal screens, handrails and built-in ply furniture. With this utilitarian structure, Donner was free to develop a functional modern solution that may not have been acceptable in other civic locations. It remains his most purely unaffected modernist work.
- Mount Eden Baptist Church – 8 Mount Eden Road. Wooden Gothic Church from the early 20th century.
- ABA Stadium – 1 Ngahura Street. Boxing stadium that launched careers of Shane Cameron, Soulan Pownceby and Junior Fa.
- TV3/Former Newshub building - 3 Flower St.

== See also ==
- Basque Park
