= Saint Lucas =

Saint Lucas may refer to:

== Individuals ==
- Saint Lucas del Espiritu Santos, a Dominican Catholic priest martyred in 1633
- Saint Lucius of Caesarea, one of the Martyrs of Caesarea also known as both Lucas and Luke
- Saint Luke the Evangelist, one of the purported canonical Gospel authors often known as Lucas

== Locations ==
- São Lucas (district of São Paulo), a Brazilian town district often known as "Saint Lucas"
- St. Lucas, Iowa, an American city

== See also ==
- Lucas (disambiguation)
- Saint Lucius (disambiguation)
- Saint Luke (disambiguation)
- San Lucas (disambiguation)
- St. Luke's (disambiguation)
