= San Luca (disambiguation) =

San Luca is a comune in the Province of Reggio Calabria, Italy.

San Luca may also refer to:

- San Luca, Genoa, a church in Genoa, Italy
- San Luca, Venice, a church in Venice, Italy
- San Luca feud, a conflict between two clans of the 'Ndrangheta
- Accademia di San Luca, an academy of artists in Rome, Italy
- "San Luca" (song), a 2024 song by Cesare Cremonini and Luca Carboni

== See also ==
- Luca (disambiguation)
- San Lucas (disambiguation)
- Saint Luke (disambiguation)
- St. Luke's (disambiguation)
