= Saint Luke (disambiguation) =

Saint Luke or Luke the Evangelist, one of the Four Evangelists.

Saint Luke may also refer to:

== Art ==
- Saint Luke (Giambologna), a c. 1600 bronze statue of Luke the Evangelist by Giambologna
- Saint Luke (El Greco), a c. 1610 painting by an artist known as El Greco
- St Luke (Hals), a 1625 painting by Frans Hals
- St. Luke (Notre Dame sculpture), a 1957 sculpture by Ivan Meštrović

== Places ==
- Saint Luke, Virginia, an unincorporated community in Shenandoah County, in the U.S. state of Virginia
- St. Luke's Hospital (disambiguation)
- Saint Luke Institute, Silver Spring, Maryland, US
- Saint Luke Parish, Dominica, an administrative parish
- Saint Luke's Tower, a skyscraper located in Chūō, Tokyo, Japan

== Other uses ==
- Gospel of Luke, tells of the origins, birth, ministry, death, resurrection, and ascension of Jesus Christ
- Guild of Saint Luke, the painters' and artists' guild in medieval Europe
- Order of Saint Luke, a religious order begun within the Methodist Church in the United States

== See also ==
- Saint-Luc (disambiguation)
- Saint Lucas (disambiguation)
- St. Luke's (disambiguation)
- San Luca (disambiguation)
- San Lucas (disambiguation)
