= Dartmouth High School (Massachusetts) =

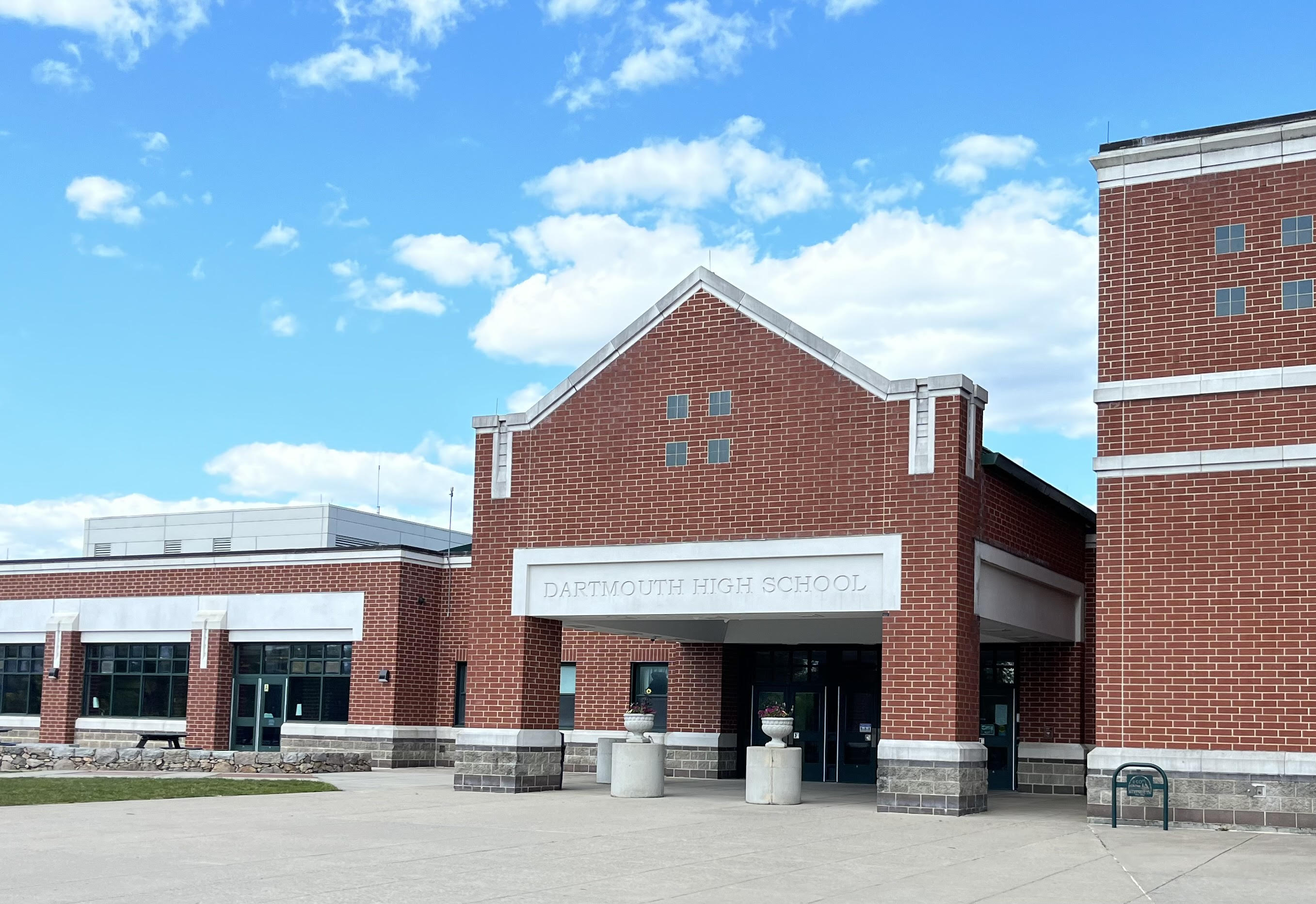

Location
- 555 Bakerville Road; Dartmouth, Massachusetts 02748; United States; 41°35′39.32″N 70°58′39.80″W

Information
- Type: Public; High School; Open enrollment
- Motto: "One Dartmouth"
- Established: 1902
- Status: Open
- School district: Dartmouth Public School District
- Superintendent: June Saba-Maguire
- Principal: Ryan Shea
- Faculty: 77.31 (on FTE basis)
- Grades: 9–12
- Age range: 14–20
- Enrollment: 871 (2025-26)
- Student to teacher ratio: 12.28
- Language: English
- Schedule: https://www.dartmouth.school//cms/lib/MA02213179/Centricity/Domain/486/2018-2019%20%20Lunch%20Schedule.pdf
- Colours: Green & White
- Song: "Glory to Dartmouth"
- Athletics: MIAA – Division 2
- Athletics conference: Pioneer Athletic Conference
- Nickname: Indians
- Rival: Fairhaven, Bishop Stang, New Bedford
- Newspaper: The Spectrum
- Yearbook: The Pathfinder
- Communities served: Town of Dartmouth
- Feeder schools: Dartmouth Middle School
- Website: dhs.dartmouth.school

Dartmouth High School is a four-year public high school serving grades 9 to 12, located in the southern half of Dartmouth, Massachusetts, United States.

As of the 2022–23 school year, the school had an enrollment of 979 students and 76.6 classroom teachers (on an FTE basis), for a student-teacher ratio of 13.5 to 1.

== History ==
=== Origins ===
The school began in 1902 on Russell's Mills Road in what is now the Salt-Marsh Pottery. By the 1930s the school had moved to a building on Slocum Road (referred to as the Elmer Poole School), which is now used as the town hall. In 1955 a new school was built next door, on the corner of Hawthorne Street, with the building being expanded twice, in 1965 and 1981. In 2003, the school was moved to its new location at the end of Bakerville Road, at the junction of Russells Mills Road, on the former farmland of the King family, with the former high school now being used as the middle school.

=== Crime ===
In 1993 during a social studies class, a student was stabbed to death by classmates who barged into the classroom armed with baseball bats, Billy clubs, and knives. Three students aged 15 and 16 were charged with first-degree murder of Jason Robinson.

In 2025 a student attempted to stab another student using a pen with a screwdriver on the end. The student was charged with assault with intent to murder, assault with a dangerous weapon, assault and battery, and assault with intent to cause serious bodily harm. No one was hurt during this incident.

=== Logo ===
For much of its early history, Dartmouth High School (DHS) had several assorted designs associated with its mascot of an Indian. In 1973, Clyde Andrews, a member of the DHS class of 1974 and a member of regional Wampanoag Tribe of Gay Head (Aquinnah) redesigned and formalized the logo to its current design. This was to more accurately reflect the eastern woodland Indians that had roots in the region of Old Dartmouth. This design was quickly adopted to represent not just the school, but Dartmouth as a whole.

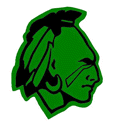
Current logo used by Dartmouth High School

The use of high school Native American mascots has been a topic of nationwide debate, leading to regional controversy over the school's logo in early 2022. With increasing contention, the question of whether to keep the Indian or replace it with a more appropriate alternative emerged. Those in support of the logo argued that the logo was more than a simple design, but an icon. It was pointed out that no iconography of the Indian was placed to where it could be stepped on and thus demeaned, along with the fact that when it was worn by sports players and members of the community alike, they "were elevated to a higher standard, to lose with grace and win with dignity." Those against the logo believed that the image's use as a sports icon had negatively affected the people of the Wampanoag tribe, and downplayed the current and former challenges Indigenous peoples had and continued to face. The issue was to be settled in early April 2022, where a vote would be held among the community to decide the fate of the Logo. With a split of 4,048 to 969, one of the largest voter turnouts in the history of the town, the community overwhelmingly advocated to keep the logo. This was later commemorated on April 25 at the annual school committee meeting.

== Music Department ==
The music department includes the marching band, concert band, and jazz band, as well as the orchestra, chamber orchestra, chorus, and a cappella group Harmonix. It also includes the Winter color guard program and the Winter percussion program. All of which are finically aided through the Dartmouth School Music Association, or DSMA, through its providing of vital funds, scholarships, and support insuring the continued survival and growth of all of these programs.

=== Marching Band ===
Year	Theme	Repertoire	NESBA Score	USSBA / USBands Score	NESBA Placement	USSBA / USBands Placement
2008	Winter Solstice	Windsprints by Richard Saucedo and October by Eric Whitacre.	98.9	98.275	1st	1st
2009	Gift of Music	Appalachian Spring by Aaron Copland	96.70	97.813	2nd	1st
2010	Ritual	160 BPM from the film Angels & Demons / The Witch and the Saint by Steven Reineke	97.60	98.550	1st	1st
2011	Twisted	Asphalt Cocktail by John Mackey / Noisy Wheels of Joy by Eric Whitacre / Arabesque by Samuel R. Hazo	98.40	98.225	1st	1st
2012	Blown Away	Urban Dances Suite: I. Ben misurato by Zdeněk Mácal / Windrider by B.J. Brooks / Velocity by Larry Neeck	96.7	96.538	1st	2nd
2013	Paris	An American in Paris by George Gershwin / Blue Shades by Frank Ticheli / Transition and Ballad / Bonaparte by Otto M. Schwarz	N/A	96.6	N/A	1st
2014	Voodoo	Strange Humors by John Mackey / Shadow Rituals by Michael Markowski / Chant Rituals by Elliot Del Borgo	99.1	97.863	1st	2nd
2015	Into the Hive	The Wasps by Ralph Vaughan Williams / Flight of the Bumblebee by Nikolai Rimsky- Korsakov	98.0	97.125	1st	2nd
2016	Into the Light of Spring	Snow Caps by Richard Saucedo / Remedy by Adele / Into the Light by Jay Bocook	98.9	97.063	1st	1st
2017	Farewell My Lovely	Harlem Nocturne by Earle Hagen and Dick Rogers / 221b Baker Street by Patrick Gowers / Marlowe's Theme from the film Farewell My Lovely / Ignition by Todd Stalter	99.1	98.350	1st	1st
2018	The Rainforest	Dance of the New World by Dana Wilson / Fly to Paradise by Eric Whitacre / Whirlybird by Todd Stalter	99.6	98.075	1st	1st
2019	The Witching Hour	The Witch and the Saint by Steven Reineke / Pampeana No. 3, Op. 24 by Alberto Ginastera	98.5	98.575	1st	1st
2020	Marching Band / Percussion; Birdland / Behind the Mask	Marching Band / Birdland by Weather Report; Percussion / Compositions from The Mask of Zorro	N/A	Marching Band / 94.8; Percussion / 98.5	N/A	1st^{†}
2021	Thorns and Petals	Scheherazade (Rimsky-Korsakov) by Rimsky-Korsakov / Kiss from a Rose by Seal (musician) / El Tango de Roxanne from Moulin Rouge!	99.2	98.0	1st	1st
2022	Forgotten	The Ecstasy of Gold by Ennio Morricone / The Magnificent Seven - Main Theme by Elmer Bernstein / Sonoran Desert Holiday by Ron Nelson / Danzon No. 2 by Arturo Márquez	99.2	97.7	1st	1st
2023	Stencils at an Alleyway	Pictures at an Exhibition by Modest Mussorgsky	N/A	98.05	N/A	1st
2024	Celestial	Claire de Lune by Claude Debussy / Moonlight Sonata by Ludwig van Beethoven	N/A	97.65	N/A	1st
2025	Beacons	Hoist the Colours from Pirates of the Caribbean: At World's End / The Wreck of the Edmund Fitzgerald by Gordon Lightfoot	N/A	94.5	N/A	3rd
2026	Caged	Feeling Good by Michael Bublé / To Die For by Hans Zimmer from The Lion King / Bluebird by Sara Bareilles / Break Free by Ariana Grande	N/A		N/A	

- ^{†} = These scores are from the USBands Virtual Grand Finale.

The band previously competed in the highest division of the NESBA marching band circuit, earning class championships in 1996, 1998, 1999, 2001, 2003, 2004, 2007, 2008, 2010, 2011, 2014, 2015, 2016, 2017, 2018, 2019, 2021, and 2022, their final year competing at circuit championships. Additionally, they have many other titles in NESBA since NESBA's founding in the early 1980s, where the marching band holds the highest score in NESBA history, 99.6, received in 2018 with the field show entitled "The Rainforest”. They also held the previous records of 99.1 scored in both 2014 and 2017.

In 2003, the band began attending USBands (formerly USSBA) championships after previous infrequent appearances at local USBands events during the 1990s. The band won its first USBands championship during their first appearance in 2003, followed by additional championship wins in 2004, 2007, 2008, 2009, 2010, 2011, 2013, 2016, 2017, 2018, 2019, 2021, 2022, 2023, and 2024, achieving an unprecedented streak of eight consecutive USBands championships between 2016-2024 while remaining undefeated in all competitions they entered in the Northeast during this time (including NESBA, USBands, and Bands of America events). While formerly awarding only class championships, USBands began awarding overall "National" championship titles (irrespective of class) beginning with the 2008 season, of which Dartmouth has been named the overall champion in almost all of their championship seasons. The USBands National Championships were held in Annapolis, Maryland (2008–2011) and are now held in East Rutherford, New Jersey (2012–present). Dartmouth is the record holder for the highest score in USBands history, achieving a 98.575 for their 2019 show (tied with the scoring record previously set in 2008 by Nazareth Area HS, PA).

The band also began competing in the Bands of America circuit in 2022 by winning in their first appearance at the New Jersey Regional Championship with an 83.600. In 2023, they returned to the Bands of America New Jersey Regional, successfully defending their title and scoring the two highest scores ever achieved by a New England band in Bands of America Regional competition, first scoring an 88.35 in preliminary competition and an 86.65 in finals competition (net of penalty). Later that year, they made their first trip to the Bands of America Grand National Championships, located in Indianapolis, IN. While there, they advanced to the semifinals round after placing 20th (4th in Class 2A) in the preliminary round. In semifinals, they finished in 28th place with a score of 81.275, 0.025 away from receiving a medal in Class 2A.

Dartmouth is only the fourth band from Massachusetts to compete in Bands of America events. They were the second Massachusetts band (now three) to make finals at a Bands of America regional event, the second Massachusetts band to win a Bands of America regional, and the third band to do so from New England, undefeated in their only two regional competition appearances. They are one of only two bands from Massachusetts to attend the Bands of America Grand Nationals, with both participants advancing to the semifinals round in their appearances.

The Band also holds many titles at MICCA and formerly in "MAA-EMBA", the Eastern Marching Band Association (1996-1999 class champions). The group has also performed at the 1996 Tournament of Roses Parade, as well as several other festivals and Magic Music Days at the Walt Disney World Resort. The band and percussion performed their own shows virtually in 2020 during the Coronavirus pandemic.

=== Winter Percussion ===
Year	Theme	Placement	Score
1998	Scenes from Gotham City	1st	98.350
1999	Scenes from West Side Story	1st	97.250
2000	Dances of the New World	2nd	96.100
2001	Passion, Grace & Fire	3rd	94.850
2002	For the Boys: A Tribute to the USO	3rd	92.600
2003	Wild Life	1st^{†}	96.8^{†}
2004	Young Guns Head West	3rd	93.100
2005	Duality	3rd	92.600
2006	What It Means To Be Human	2nd	94.000
2007	The Turning Point	2nd	94.800
2008	Mightier Than The Sword: Modern Day Gladiators	1st	96.750
2009	The Garden	1st	97.988
2010	Conviction	3rd	95.500
2011	The Siren's Song	2nd	95.813
2012	Evolved	2nd	96.825
2013	Stealing Fire	4th	94.288
2014	Let Them Eat Cake: Marie Antionette's Scandalous Life	1st	98.238
2015	Speakeasy	3rd	95.588
2016	Revolution	5th	93.863
2017	Emotional Roller Coaster	5th	94.600
2018	Out of the Box	2nd	97.188
2019	All In - A Dance With Addiction	4th	94.888
2020	The Web	N/A^{‡}	N/A^{‡}
2021	The Web 2.0	N/A	N/A
2022	The Curse of Medusa	3rd	97.525
2023	The Raven: From the Desk of Edgar Allan Poe	6th	94.688
2024	Gallery X: Where Art Comes to Life	4th	95.700
2025	Tom's Diner	9th	90.400
2026	Tolled by the Bells	6th	94.688

- ^{†} = The group did not attend WGI World Championships and only attended NESBA Finals.
- ^{‡} = The group did not attend WGI World Championships or NESBA Finals.

The Dartmouth High Winter Percussion performs in Winter Guard International where they consistently placed in the top 3 from 1998 to 2013. Today, they compete in Scholastic World Class at Winter Guard International championships held in Dayton, Ohio. The group won WGI Percussion Scholastic World Championships in 1998, 1999, 2008, 2009, and 2014, with 2nd-place finishes in 2000, 2006, 2007, 2011, 2012, and 2018 and 3rd-place finishes in 2001, 2002, 2004, 2005, 2010, 2015, and 2022. In Winter Guard International world class competitions, they have consistently won fan favorite. They have also held the record for the highest scoring group in the Percussion Scholastic World division for 15+ years. The group did not attend NESBA Finals or WGI World Championships in 2020 because of the global COVID-19 pandemic. The group was able to perform in virtual WGI competitions in 2021, however.

=== Winter Guard ===
Year	Theme	Class	Placement	Score
2014	On the Other Side	Scholastic A	12th	86.730
2015	Stand Up	Scholastic A	N/A	N/A
2016	#Gossip	Scholastic A	13th	87.930
2017	Bioluminescence	Scholastic A	2nd	96.915
2018	Lilith of Eden	Scholastic Open	13th	86.0
2019	Granted	Scholastic Open	12th	86.6
2020	Jazz'D	Scholastic Open	N/A^{†}	N/A^{†}
2021	Tourada A Corda	Scholastic Open	N/A	N/A
2022	Jagged Little Tour	Scholastic Open	24th	79.8
2023	Beethoven's 10th	Scholastic Open	25th	81.9

- ^{†} = The group did not attend WGI Championships or NESBA Finals.

The DHS Winter Guard competed in the Scholastic A Class of WGI where they made WGI Finals three times – in 2014, 2016, and 2017. After their 2nd-place finish in 2017 the group moved into the Scholastic Open Class where they received 13th place in their debut season in the division in 2018. The Winter Guard has been awarded the "Fan Favorite" award in 2016, 2017, and 2019. The Winter Guard did not attend NESBA Finals or WGI Championships in 2020 because of the global pandemic.

=== Winter Winds ===
Year	Theme	Class	Placement	Score
2022	Mechanized	Scholastic A	2nd	89.775
2023	Fiber	Scholastic Open	3rd	91.850

The DHS Indoor winds program was established in 2021-2022 under the direction of Ian Flint and Michael Rayner. The winds made WGI finals and placed 2nd during their first year despite facing early complications and a complete show redesign due to copyright issues.

=== Orchestra ===
The high school's orchestra has also traveled to many places national as well as international places such as Ireland, the Azores, Canada, Austria and Germany, and New York. They traveled to Ireland again in April 2014, which included playing for the mayor, and getting critiqued by music professors there. On December 16, 2016, the high school performed a tribute concert to the Trans-Siberian Orchestra, featuring both students and guest musicians on electric violin, cello, guitar, along with a drummer and a keyboardist., and hosted another Trans-Siberian Orchestra tribute concert at the Zeiterion Performing Arts Center in New Bedford the next year. The orchestra also traveled to Scotland in July 2018.

== Athletics ==
=== Football accomplishments ===
- State Champions – 1983, 1984, 2014, 2015
- State Finalists – 1977, 1982, 1991, 1995, 2007
- League Champions – 1977, 1982, 1983, 1984, 1991, 1995, 2006, 2007, 2008, 2016

== Notable alumni ==
- Norm deSilva - basketball coach
- Jordan Todman – former NFL running back for the San Diego Chargers, Minnesota Vikings, Jacksonville Jaguars, Carolina Panthers, Pittsburgh Steelers, Indianapolis Colts, New York Jets, and Houston Texans, played running back for University of Connecticut
- Arthur Lynch – former NFL tight end for the Miami Dolphins, New York Jets, Denver Broncos, and Atlanta Falcons, played tight end for the University of Georgia
- Brian Rose – former MLB player for the Boston Red Sox, Colorado Rockies, New York Mets, and Tampa Bay Rays
- Pete Souza – former Chief Official White House Photographer (2009-2017)
- Huda Kattan – makeup artist and business owner
- Lewis Millett – United States Medal of Honor recipient
