= St Luke's =

St. Luke's may refer to:

== Places ==
- St Luke's, London, a district of London, UK
- St Luke's, Old Street, church of the above parish
- St Luke's Campus, part of the University of Exeter, Exeter, Devon, England
- St Luke's railway station, Southport, Merseyside, UK
- St Lukes, New Zealand, a suburb of Auckland, New Zealand
- Westfield St Lukes, a shopping mall in Auckland, New Zealand

== Others ==
- St. Luke's University Health Network, a hospital/health network in Bethlehem, Pennsylvania, USA
- Saint Luke's Health System, a health care system and affiliated hospitals around Kansas City, Missouri, USA
- Saint Luke's Home for Destitute and Aged Women, in Middletown, Connecticut, USA
- St Luke's F.C., a football club in Northern Ireland, United Kingdom
- St Luke's F.C. (England), a defunct football club in England, United Kingdom

== See also ==
- St. Luke's Church (disambiguation)
- St Luke's Hospital (disambiguation)
- St. Luke's School (disambiguation)
- St Luke's University (disambiguation)
- Saint Luke (disambiguation)
- Saint-Luc (disambiguation)
