= St. Luke's Hospital =

St. Luke's Hospital may refer to:

== Australia ==
- St Lukes Private Hospital, Launceston, Tasmania
- St Luke's Private Hospital, Potts Point, Sydney, New South Wales

== Canada ==
- Hôpital Saint-Luc, Montreal, Quebec

== China ==
- Shanghai Chest Hospital, formerly St. Luke's Hospital

== Ireland ==
- St. Luke's Hospital, Clonmel
- St. Luke's General Hospital, Kilkenny
- St. Luke's Hospital, Rathgar, Dublin

== Japan ==
- St. Luke's International Hospital

== Malta ==
- St. Luke's Hospital, Malta

== Philippines ==
- St. Luke's Medical Center
  - St. Luke's Medical Center – Global City
  - St. Luke's Medical Center – Quezon City

== Singapore ==
- St Luke's Hospital, Singapore

== United Kingdom ==
- St Luke's Hospital, Bradford
- St Luke's Hospital, Guildford
- St Luke's Hospital, Huddersfield
- St Luke's Hospital, Middlesbrough
- St Luke's Hospital, Rugby, open from 1948 to 1993
- St Luke's Hospital for the Clergy, London
- St Luke's Hospital for Lunatics, London, open from 1751 to 1916

== United States ==
- Aurora St. Luke's Medical Center, part of the Aurora Health Care hospital system, Milwaukee, Wisconsin
- Avera St. Luke's Hospital, Aberdeen, South Dakota
- Faxton St. Luke's Healthcare, Utica, New York
- St. Luke's Hospital (San Francisco, California)
- St Luke Medical Center (Pasadena, California) (Closed in 2002)
- Old St. Luke's Hospital, a former hospital building in Jacksonville, Florida, listed on the National Register of Historic Places
  - St. Luke's Hospital (Jacksonville, Florida), now known as St. Vincent's Medical Center Southside
- St. Luke's Boise Medical Center, Idaho
- St. Luke's Hospital (Chicago, Illinois), listed on the National Register of Historic Places in Illinois
- St. Luke's Hospital (Cedar Rapids, Iowa)
- St. Luke's Hospital (Davenport, Iowa), listed on the National Register of Historic Places listings in Iowa
- St. Luke's Regional Medical Center (Sioux City, Iowa)
- St. Luke's Hospital, Middleborough, Massachusetts
- St. Luke's Hospital (New Bedford, Massachusetts)
- St. Luke's Hospital (Chesterfield, Missouri)
- Saint Luke's Hospital of Kansas City, Missouri
- St. Luke's–Roosevelt Hospital Center, Manhattan, New York City (now Mount Sinai Morningside)
- St. Luke's Hospital (Cleveland, Ohio), listed on the National Register of Historic Places listings in Ohio
- St. Luke's Hospital (Maumee, Ohio)
- St. Luke's University Health Network, including St. Luke's Hospital in Bethlehem, Pennsylvania
- St. Luke's Episcopal Hospital, Houston, Texas
- St. Luke's Rehabilitation Institute, formerly St. Luke's Hospital, Spokane, Washington

== See also ==
- Saint Luke (disambiguation)
- St. Luke's (disambiguation)
