= Arthur Lynch (American football) =

American football player (born 1990)

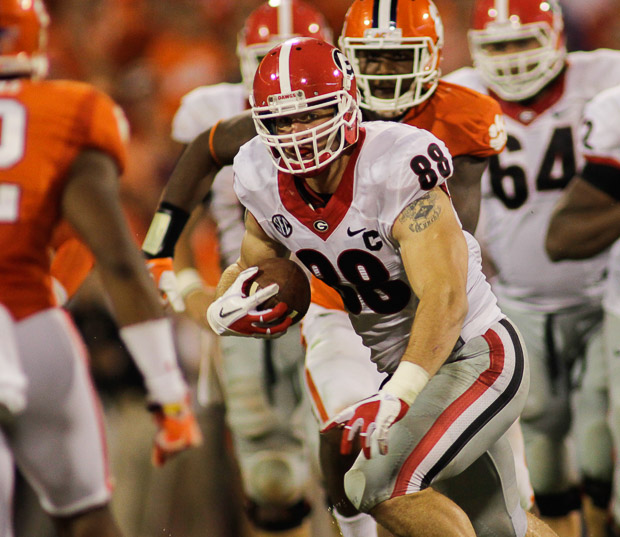
- Lynch with the Georgia Bulldogs vs. Clemson Tigers in 2013

No. 88, 83
- Position: Tight end

Personal information
- Born: June 17, 1990 (age 36); Fall River, Massachusetts, U.S.
- Listed height: 6 ft 5 in (1.96 m)
- Listed weight: 255 lb (116 kg)

Career information
- High school: Dartmouth (Dartmouth, Massachusetts)
- College: Georgia
- NFL draft: 2014: 5th round, 155th overall pick

Career history
- Miami Dolphins (2014); New York Jets (2015)*; Denver Broncos (2015)*; Atlanta Falcons (2016)*
- * Offseason or practice squad member only

Awards and highlights
- First-team All–SEC (2013); Third-team All–SEC (2012)
- Stats at Pro Football Reference

Arthur Lynch (born June 17, 1990) is an American former football tight end. He was selected by the Miami Dolphins in the fifth round of the 2014 NFL draft. He played college football for the Georgia Bulldogs.

== Early life ==
Lynch attended Dartmouth High School in Dartmouth, Massachusetts, where his grandfather had previously been a coach for 36 years and had a 202–79–9 record. In his junior season, he primarily served as a blocker for Jordan Todman, who would later become an All-American at the University of Connecticut and an NFL running back. During that season, he had 10 receptions for 160 yards and two touchdowns, as well as 63 tackles and four sacks. Dartmouth finished the regular season as champions of the Old Colony League with an 11–1 record. In the State Semifinal, they defeated Brockton High School with a score of 40–7, and lost in overtime in the Division-I Super Bowl against Everett High School.

During the 2008 season, Lynch was one of captains, all of whom continued their football careers at the collegiate level. In his senior year, Lynch continued to excel both on offense and defense. He made 16 receptions for 249 yards and scored three touchdowns. Defensively, he produced 55 tackles, 11.0 tackles for loss, 4.5 sacks, 9 hurries, and 3 forced fumbles. Dartmouth finished the regular season as undefeated champions of the Old Colony League. In the Division-I State Semifinal, they lost 20–13 to Brockton High School. Lynch was named to the Massachusetts High School Football Coaches Association All-State Super 26 team and received recognition as a Boston Globe and Boston Herald All-Scholastic. He served as team captain and was honored by having his No. 88 jersey retired, which is now on display in the Dartmouth High School Field House named after his grandfather. Additionally, he played varsity basketball under the guidance of Steve Gaspar, the winningest basketball coach in the school's history. Notably, he also held the position of Class President.

As a recruit, Lynch was highly regarded, receiving a four-star rating from Rivals.com. He was recognized as the top recruit in Massachusetts, the second-best tight end prospect nationally, and ranked 121st overall in the country by Rivals. In the spring of 2008, he committed to playing for Jeff Jagodzinski and the Boston College Eagles, which was not only his choice but also the alma mater of both his mother and sister. However, he later reopened his recruitment that summer, and proceeded to visit various universities including Florida, Georgia, NC State, North Carolina, Virginia, and Maryland. Prior to his senior season, Lynch verbally committed to playing for Mark Richt at the University of Georgia, a team that began the college football season ranked #1 in the country. On National Signing Day, which took place on February 4, 2009, he signed his National Letter of Intent to join the Georgia Bulldogs. The signing helped contribute to the Bulldogs #4 overall class ranking in the country according to Scout.com.

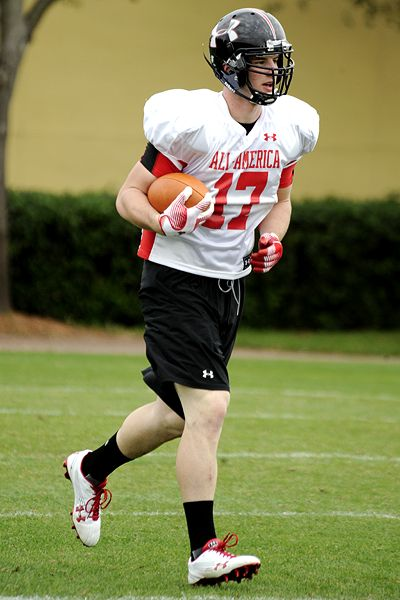
Lynch at the Under Armour All-American game

Lynch's achievements also earned him recognition, as he was named to the PrepStar All-America Team, SuperPrep All-American and All-New England Teams. He was also selected as one of the 100 high school player to participate in the 2009 Under Armour All-America Game. Notably, he became the first and only football player from Dartmouth High School to be selected for an All-America game and the first player from Massachusetts to participate in the Under Armour Game.

College recruiting
Name	Hometown	School	Height	Weight	40^{‡}	Commit date
Arthur Lynch; TE	Dartmouth, Massachusetts	Dartmouth High School	6 ft 5 in (1.96 m)	240 lb (110 kg)	4.7	Aug 12, 2008
Arthur Lynch; TE	Recruit ratings: Scout: Rivals: 247Sports:					
Overall recruit ranking: 247Sports: 141, 2 (TE), 1 (MA)
‡ Refers to 40-yard dash; Note: In many cases, Scout, Rivals, 247Sports, On3, and ESPN may conflict in their listings of height, weight and 40 time.; In these cases, the average was taken. ESPN grades are on a 100-point scale.; Sources: "2009 Team Ranking". Rivals.com.

== College career ==
During his collegiate years from 2009 to 2013, Lynch enrolled at the University of Georgia (UGA). Throughout his time at UGA, he was coached by tight ends coach John Lilly, offensive coordinator Mike Bobo, and head coach Mark Richt.

=== 2009 ===
Lynch decided to forego a redshirt and appeared in 11 games as a true freshman. He played with fellow freshman Orson Charles, who would later receive Freshman All-America Honors. Lynch made his collegiate debut on September 5, 2009, in 24–10 loss to Oklahoma State at Boone Pickens Stadium. He secured his first reception on November 7, 2009, against Tennessee Tech, finishing the game with 2 catches for 17 yards. In recognition of his academic achievements, Lynch was named to the Athletic Director's Honor Roll for the Summer and Fall Semesters, and he also earned Dean's List recognition during the Summer Semester.

=== 2010 ===
During his sophomore year, the coaching staff decided to redshirt Lynch, which allowed him to extend his eligibility and further develop his skills. Additionally, he received recognition for his academic achievements by being named to the Southeastern Conference (SEC) Academic Honor Roll.

=== 2011 ===
In his redshirt sophomore year, Lynch served as a backup to Orson Charles and played in 13 games.

=== 2012 ===
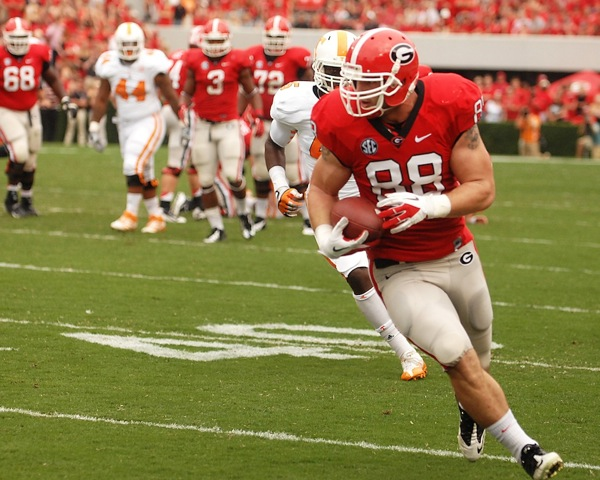
Arthur Lynch running after the catch vs. the University of Tennessee during the 2012 season.

After the 2011 season, Orson Charles, the All-American tight end, decided to enter the NFL draft, creating an opportunity for Lynch to step into the starting. Leading up to the 2012 season, Lynch had primarily been utilized as a blocking tight end. However, as the season progressed, he showcased his abilities as a reliable pass catcher. Throughout the 2012 season, Lynch played in 14 games, starting in 13 of them. He recorded 24 receptions for 431 yards and 3 touchdowns.

On September 15, 2012, Lynch caught his first collegiate touchdown against the Florida Atlantic Owls. He finished the game with 3 catches for 73 yards and a touchdown in 56–20 win. The Bulldogs finished the 2012 regular season ranked #3 in the country. During the last drive of the 2012 SEC Championship Game against the #2 ranked Alabama Crimson Tide, Lynch caught a 26-yard pass from his college roommate Aaron Murray and advanced the ball to the 8-yard line before being tackled by Vinnie Sunseri. The Bulldogs were unable to score a touchdown, and lost the game 32–28. Georgia beat #16 Nebraska 45–31 in the 2013 Capital One Bowl, in which Lynch caught 3 passes for 37 yards and a touchdown.

After the 2012 season, Lynch received recognition for his performance. He was named to Phil Steele's 2012 All-SEC 3rd Team and also received the Team's Most Improved Player award at the end of the year GALA. Georgia finished the season ranked #4 and #5 by the Coaches' and AP Poll, respectively.

=== 2013 ===
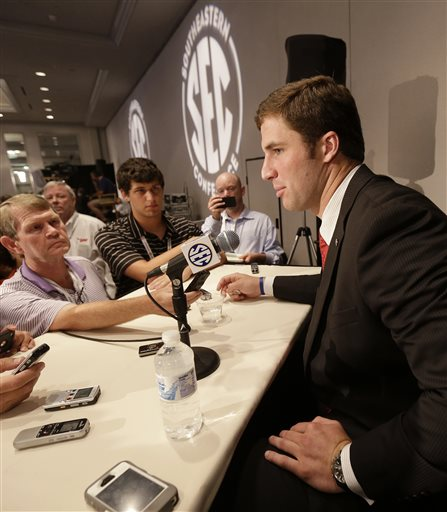
Lynch answering questions at the 2013 SEC Media Days

Prior to the 2013 season, Lynch received recognition by being named to several Preseason All-America and All-SEC Teams, including selections by Phil Steele, SB Nation, Athlon Sports, Sporting News, and others. He was also included in the Mackey Award Pre-Season Watch-List, which recognizes the nation's top tight end at the end of each college football season. Lynch, along with his roommate Murray and Garrison Smith, represented the University of Georgia football team at the 2013 SEC Media Days, where Lynch was named to the Pre-Season Media Days All-SEC Team. Georgia began the season ranked #5 in both the preseason Coaches' and AP Poll.

Georgia opened the season vs. their rival, #8 ranked Clemson Tigers, in Memorial Stadium, also known as 'Death Valley.' The game was picked for ESPN College Football GameDay game-of-the-week and was hosted by the show's signature crew which at the time included Chris Fowler, Lee Corso, Kirk Herbstreit, Desmond Howard, and former Georgia Football player, David Pollack. Georgia would lose the game 38-35 and Lynch would have 1 catch for 18 yards.

In the following week, Georgia faced off against the #6 ranked South Carolina Gamecocks, a game that showcased the talents of future No. 1 overall pick Jadeveon Clowney. Georgia emerged victorious with a 41–30 win, and Lynch recorded 3 catches for 26 yards and a touchdown.

On September 29, 2013, Georgia hosted #6 ranked LSU Tigers in another highly anticipated matchup, featuring former Georgia Quarterback and Athens, Georgia native Zach Mettenberger. ESPN's College GameDay crew returned for the second time that season to cover the game. The game revolved around the performances of Murray and Mettenberger, who were recruited to Georgia and were once roommates. Both quarterbacks delivered impressive performances, culminating in a thrilling 44–41 victory for Georgia, as their defense halted a Mettenberger-led-fourth-quarter comeback. Murray threw for 298 yards and 4 touchdowns, while Lynch contributed with 3 catches for 40 yards.

On Saturday, November 2, 2012, Lynch sustained an injury when tackled by Florida linebacker Antonio Morrison, resulting in a lacerated kidney and several bruised ribs. Despite passing blood in his urine Lynch finished the game. He sat out the subsequent game against Appalachian State due to his kidney laceration, marking the only game he missed due to injury throughout his collegiate career. In total, Lynch appeared and started in 12 games, recording 30 passes for 459 yards and leading all receivers with 5 touchdowns.

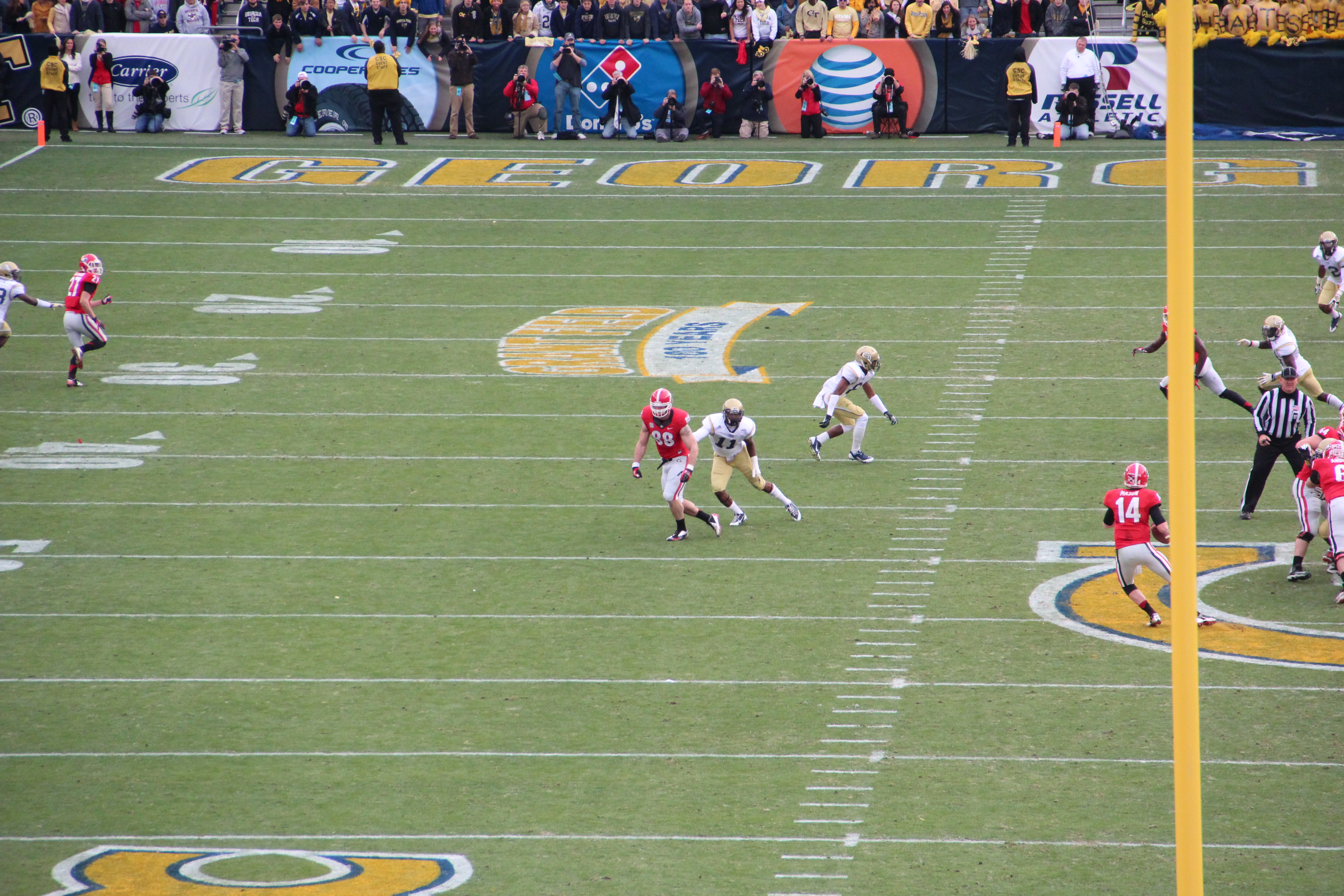
Photo from the 2013 Georgia Tech Yellow Jackets football team, all taken at Bobby Dodd Stadium.

The Bulldogs finished the regular season 8-4 and ranked No. 23 in the AP Poll. They earned a New Year's Six Bowl berth and accepted an invitation to play Nebraska in the TaxSlayer Gator Bowl. In his final collegiate game, Lynch had one of his best statistical performances of his career, catching 6 passes for 69 yards. However, he dropped a crucial pass that ended Georgia's potential game-winning drive in the fourth quarter. Georgia lost the game 24-19 and finished the season unranked.

Following the season, Lynch was named to the Associated Press, SEC Coaches, and Sporting News All-SEC 1st Team. He also received a Sports Illustrated All-America Honorable Mention. Lynch was voted Offensive Team Captain by his teammates and finished his career with 56 receptions for 907 yards and eight touchdowns.

=== College statistics ===
Season	Team	Conf	Class	Pos	GP	Rec	Yds	Avg	TD
2009	Georgia	SEC	FR	TE	13	2	17	8.5	0
2011	Georgia	SEC	RS-SO	TE	13	0	0	0	0
2012	Georgia	SEC	RS-JR	TE	14	24	431	18.0	3
2013	Georgia	SEC	RS-SR	TE	13	30	459	15.3	5
Career					53	56	907	16.2	8

== Professional career ==
=== Pre-draft ===
After completing his college career, Lynch prepared for the NFL Combine by training at IMG Academy alongside other NFL prospects such as Teddy Bridgewater, CJ Mosley, and Ryan Shazier. He received an invitation to the Reese's Senior Bowl, a prestigious all-star game held annually in Mobile, Alabama, featuring the top NFL draft prospects who have finished their college eligibility.

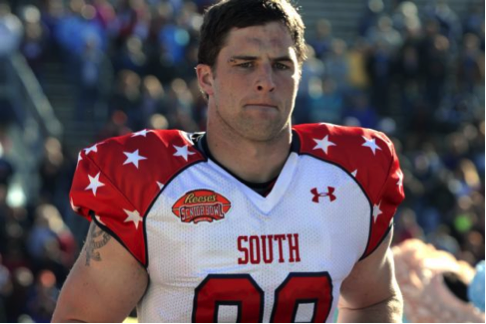
Lynch at the Senior Bowl in Mobile, AL.

Lynch attended the NFL Scouting Combine in Indianapolis, where he participated in various field drills, psychological evaluations, and medical tests. He ranked Top-10 among tight ends in multiple categories, including the second-highest number of bench press repetitions of 225 lbs. with 28, trailing only Joe Jon Duncan, of Dixie State.

Leading up to the draft, Lynch was highly regarded by analysts and considered one of the top tight end prospects in the 2014 draft class. Greg Cosell, Senior Producer of NFL Films, compared him to the accomplished Pittsburgh Steelers tight end Heath Miller. Various outlets, including Bleacher Report, projected Lynch as a potential Day 3 selection in the draft.

During the pre-draft process, Lynch extended his support for Michael Sam, a defensive end from the Missouri Tigers and fellow NFL draft prospect. Sam made history as the first openly gay player in the NFL. In an interview for the Macon Telegraph with Georgia beat writer Seth Emerson, Lynch expressed admiration for Sam, saying, "Man to man, I think it takes a certain amount of courage and inner strength to do that [come out]." He offered further support for Sam calling his announcement "a really big step" for the gay community.

Pre-Draft Measurable's
Height	Weight	Arm Length	Handspan	40-yard dash	10-yard split	20-yard shuttle	Three-cone drill	Vertical Jump	Broad jump	Bench Press
6 ft 4 5/8 in	258 lb	32 1/2 in	10 1/8 in	4.82 s	1.67 s	4.35 s	7.38 s	29.5 in	9 ft 8 in (115 in)	28
All values from NFL Combine

=== Miami Dolphins ===
In the 2014 NFL draft, Lynch was chosen in fifth round as the 155th overall pick by the Miami Dolphins. He signed his rookie contract on May 22, 2014. Shortly after the draft, Lynch suffered a non-contact injury during the team's voluntary workout, which led to him being placed on injured reserve on August 26, 2014, due to a partial fracture of the L4/L5 Lumbar Spine.

During his time with the Dolphins, Lynch was coached by Dan Campbell, who is currently the head coach of the Detroit Lions.

Lynch was one of two rookies selected to participate in the NFL Business Management & Entrepreneurial Program (BM&E) offered through the Wharton School of the University of Pennsylvania.

On August 17, 2015, he was waived by the Dolphins following the first pre-season game of the 2015 season.

=== New York Jets ===
Lynch was claimed off waivers by the New York Jets on August 19, 2015. On September 5, 2015, he was waived.

=== Denver Broncos ===
On September 7, 2015, Lynch signed a contract with the Denver Broncos as a member of their practice squad. On December 1, 2015, he was released.

=== Atlanta Falcons ===
On July 27, 2016, Lynch was signed by the Atlanta Falcons. On August 27, 2016, Lynch was waived by the Falcons.

=== Retirement ===
In October 2016, Lynch underwent a discectomy procedure to remove a portion of an intervertebral disc. Complications arose when fluid started leaking from the surgical wound shortly after the surgery. As a result, he was rushed to St. Luke's Hospital in New Bedford, Massachusetts, where emergency surgery was performed to remove the infected tissue. The severity of the infection required Lynch to stay in the hospital for 6 days. To address the lingering Strep Virus infection, a peripherally inserted central catheter (PICC) line was attached through his armpit prior to his discharge. Following a six-month period of antibiotics and rehabilitation, Lynch made the decision to retire from football.

== Personal life ==
Lynch was originally named Arthur Charles Fontaine II, named after his great-grandfather on his father's side. After his father left the family when he was 14 years old, Lynch began using the name Lynch-Fontaine, and legally changed his name to Arthur Charles Lynch on his 18th birthday. He was raised by his mother, and is the youngest of four children and the only boy. Two of his sisters competed in track and field at the collegiate level.

In 2018, Lynch was accepted into the United States Army Officer Candidate School. He had previously been medically rejected from the US Army and US Marine Corps, and received letters of support from Senator Elizabeth Warren and Congressman Bill Keating. He completed training and commissioned in 2019, and chose to branch infantry.

In 2021, he participated in the New York City Marathon, representing the charitable organization Haymakers for Hope an organization dedicated to fighting cancer.

In March 2022, Lynch was charged with two counts of felony sexual battery in Tennessee. The charges were subsequently reduced and dismissed in their entirety following a deferred prosecution agreement. Lynch's record was fully expunged, restoring him to the legal status he held prior to the charges.

Following his military service, Lynch enrolled in the Samuel Curtis Johnson Graduate School of Management at Cornell University, pursuing a Master of Business Administration degree. During his studies, Lynch completed an investment banking internship in the MBA Summer Associate Generalist program at Jefferies.
