= Arthur Lynch =

Arthur Lynch may refer to:

- Arthur Lynch (American football) (born 1990), American football player
- Arthur Lynch (politician) (1861–1934), Irish-Australian physician, soldier and nationalist MP
- Arthur Lynch (mayor) (died 1507), mayor of Galway 1507
- Arthur Lynch fitz Andrew (died 1540), mayor of Galway 1539–40
- Arthur Lynch, character in Person of Interest (TV series)
