= Tobey Homestead =

Historic house in Massachusetts, United States

- U.S. National Register of Historic Places
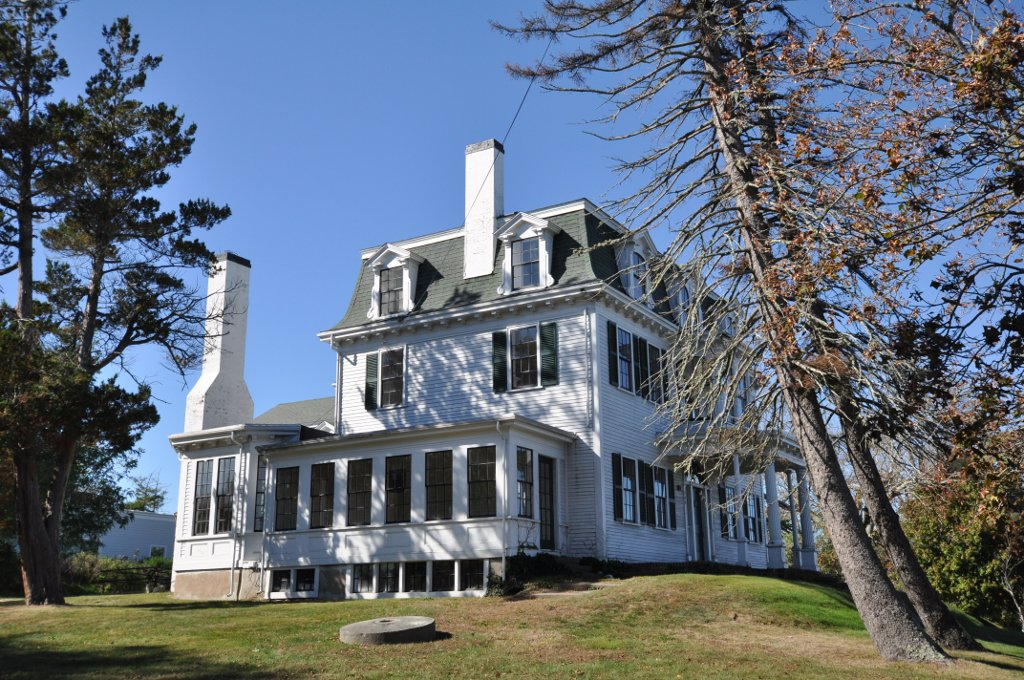

- Location within Massachusetts Location within the United States
- Location: Wareham, Massachusetts
- Coordinates: 41°45′24″N 70°42′51″W
- Built: 1825
- Architectural style: Second Empire, Federal
- NRHP reference No.: 86001219
- Added to NRHP: June 5, 1986

The Tobey Homestead was a historic farmhouse located at the crossroads of Main Street and Sandwich Road in Wareham, Massachusetts.

== Description and history ==
The 2 1/2-story wood-frame house, which occupied a prominent site in the town center in front of Tobey Hospital, was built c. 1825 and extensively remodeled c. 1870. The house followed a basic Federal-style plan, five bays wide and two deep. The 1870 alterations included adding the mansard roof with gable dormers, giving it a characteristic Second Empire appearance. A rear ell and left-side sun porch also date to this period. The Tobeys were a prominent local family who owned a local iron foundry and other businesses. The property was given to the town by bequest in 1938, for use as a hospital.

The house was listed on the National Register of Historic Places on June 5, 1986.

On August 26, 2019, Tobey Homestead was demolished to make way for an expansion of the Tobey Hospital Emergency Department.

== See also ==
- National Register of Historic Places listings in Plymouth County, Massachusetts
