= Saint-Luc =

Saint-Luc or Saint Luke may refer to:

== People ==
- Saint Luke or Luke the Evangelist, one of the Four Evangelists. The Early Church Fathers ascribed to him authorship of both the Gospel of Luke and the Acts of the Apostles. Patron saint of artists, physicians, bachelors, surgeons, students and butchers; his feast day is 18 October

== Places ==
- Saint-Luc, Quebec, Canada, a former town, now part of Saint-Jean-sur-Richelieu
- Côte Saint-Luc, a city on the island of Montreal in Quebec, Canada
- Saint Luke Parish, Dominica, an administrative parish
- Saint-Luc, Eure, France, a village
- Saint-Luc, Switzerland, a municipality

== Others ==
- AS Saint-Luc, a football team in the Democratic Republic of Congo
- Cliniques Universitaires Saint-Luc, a hospital in Brussels, Belgium
- Groupe de Saint-Luc, a Swiss Catholic art movement (1919–1945)
- Institut Saint-Luc, a Belgian art school

== See also ==
- Guild of Saint Luke, the painters' and artists' guild in medieval Europe
- Saint-Luc-de-Bellechasse, Quebec, a municipality
- Saint-Luc-de-Vincennes, Quebec, a municipality
- Saint Lucas (disambiguation)
- St. Luke's (disambiguation)
- San Luca, an Italian village
- San Lucas (disambiguation)
- Luc (disambiguation)
