= The New York Pops =

Pops orchestra in New York City

- Orchestra
- The New York Pops at Carnegie Hall
- Founded: 1983
- Principal conductor: Steven Reineke
- Website: www.newyorkpops.org

The New York Pops is the largest independent pops orchestra in the United States, and the only professional symphonic orchestra in New York City specializing in popular music. Led by Music Director Steven Reineke, the orchestra performs an annual subscription series and birthday gala at Carnegie Hall. The New York Pops annual birthday gala is celebrated each spring, raising funds for the orchestra and its PopsEd programs.

Past media projects include the Macy’s 4th of July Fireworks Spectacular on NBC Television, a nationally syndicated radio series and performances on PBS. The orchestra’s discography includes recordings of popular standards, theater and film scores, and music for the holidays.

The New York Pops was founded by Skitch Henderson in 1983.

== History ==
In 1990, the New York Pops and the University Christian Church Chancel Choir of Fort Worth, TX performed the world premiere of the piece, "Gloria" by Randol Alan Bass.
