= Saint Lucius =

Saint Lucius is the name of:

- Pope Lucius I (died 254), pope from June 25, 253 to March 4, 254
- Lucius (died 259), one of the Martyrs of Carthage under Valerian
- Saint Lucius of Chur, first bishop of Chur (feast on Dec 2)
- Saint Lucius of Cyrene, one of the founders of the Christian Church in Antioch of Syria (feast on May 6)
- Lucius of Britain, semi-legendary king of Britain
- Ptolemaeus and Lucius (died 165), Christian martyrs
- Quintian, Lucius and Julian (died 430), African martyrs
- Saint Nohra (or Nuhra), also known as St. Lucius, a Maronite saint
- Bishop Lucius of Caesarea, one of the Martyrs of Caesarea (also known as Luke and Lucas)
