= St. Luke's School =

St. Luke's School or St. Luke School may refer to:

- St. Luke's School (Manhattan), Greenwich Village, New York, United States
- St. Luke's School (Connecticut), New Canaan, Connecticut, United States
- St Luke's Church of England School, Exeter, Devon, England
- St Luke's High School, Barrhead, Glasgow, Scotland
- St Luke's Primary School (C of E), Crosby, near Liverpool, England
- St Luke's Grammar School, Sydney, Australia
- St Luke's Anglican School, Queensland, Australia
- St Luke's School, in Portsmouth, England
- St. Luke School (Georgia), in Columbus, Georgia, United States
- St. Luke Elementary School, Ontario, Canada
- St. Luke School, one of the Greater Saskatoon Catholic Schools
