= St Lukes, New Zealand =

St Lukes
- Suburb
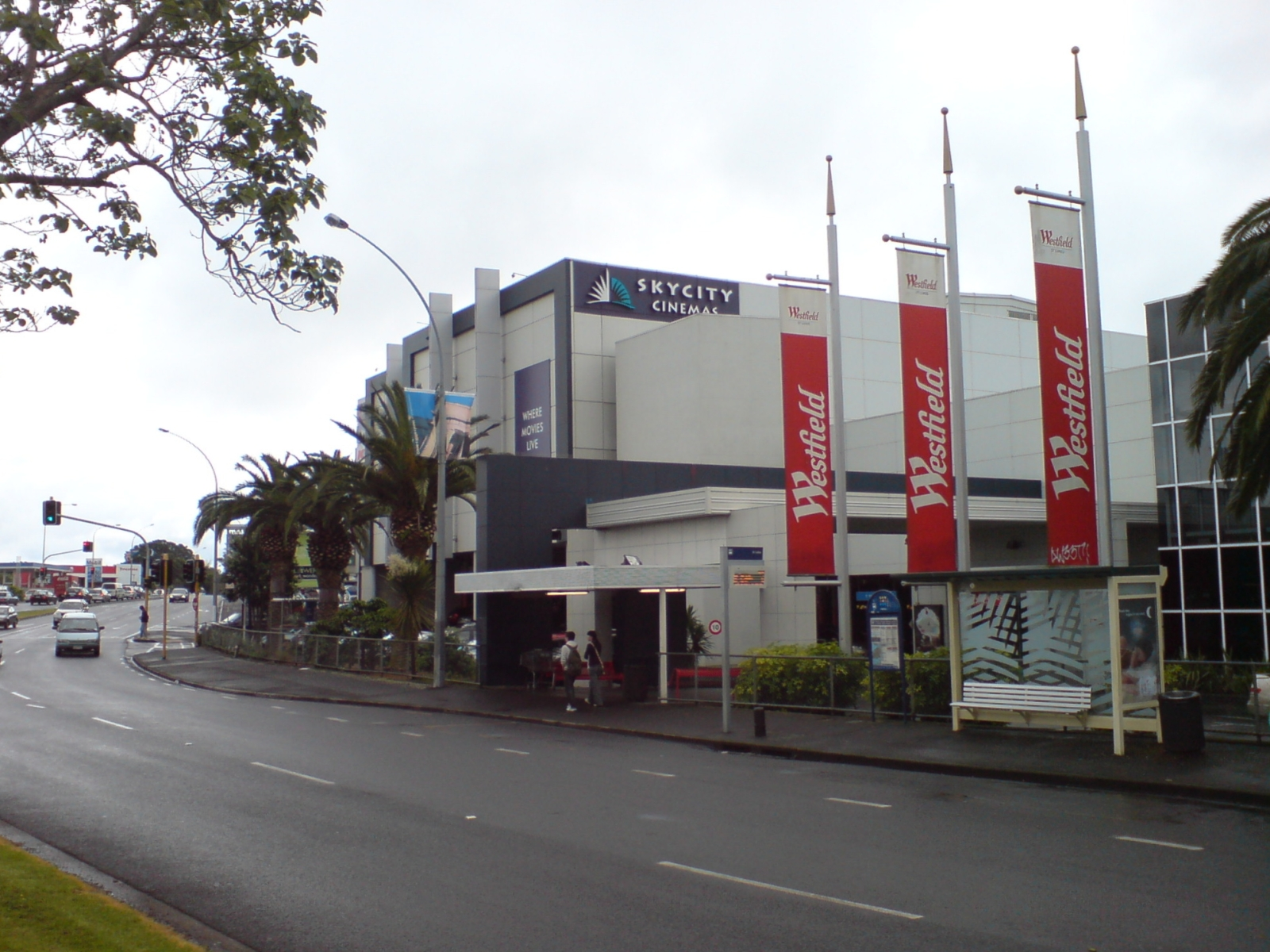
- Westfield St Lukes
- Interactive map of St Lukes
- Coordinates: 36°52′59″S 174°43′53″E
- Country: New Zealand
- City: Auckland
- Local authority: Auckland Council
- Electoral ward: Albert-Eden-Puketāpapa ward
- Local board: Albert-Eden Local Board

Area
  - Land: 46 ha (110 acres)

Population (June 2025)
  - Total: 2,190
  - Density: 4,800/km^{2} (12,000/sq mi)

Mount Albert	Morningside	Sandringham
Mount Albert	St Lukes	Sandringham
Mount Albert	Owairaka	Sandringham

St Lukes is a suburb of New Zealand's largest city, Auckland. It is under the local governance of the Auckland Council. After Westfield St Lukes opened in 1972, the area developed into a major commercial area of the Auckland isthmus.

== Geography ==
St Lukes is a small suburb on the Auckland isthmus, located between New North Road and Sandringham Road in the vicinity of Saint Lukes Road.

== History ==
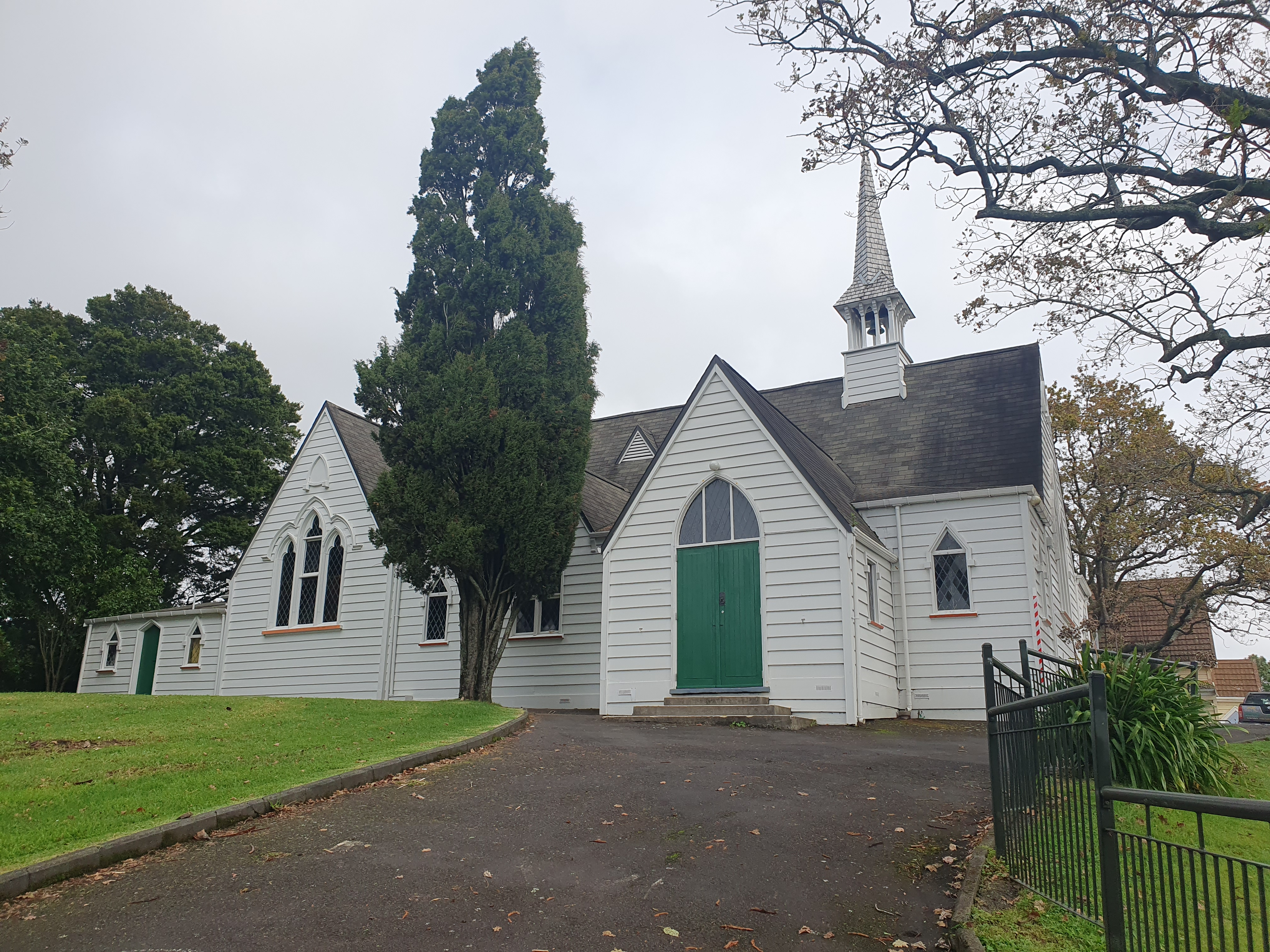
St Luke's Church on New North Road

The broader area was originally swampland, and known to Tāmaki Māori as Ngā Anawai, referring to the water-filled lava-flow caves that formed in the area. The lava caves were created by Maungawhau / Mount Eden and Mount Albert over 30,000 years ago. The area, especially the north-east along Sandringham Road at Gribblehirst Park was known to early European residents as Cabbage Tree Swamp, due to the number of tī kōuka (cabbage trees) that lined the swampland.

On 29 June 1841, the Mount Albert area was sold to the Crown by Ngāti Whātua, as a part of a 12,000 acre section. The terrain of the area was rough, meaning the area saw slower development compared to other parts of the Auckland isthmus. In the 1860s, New North Road was established as road access for the area and as an alternative to the Great North Road to the north. In 1864, reverend Alexander French purchased allotment 161 and established a farm in the modern St Lukes area. Allan Kerr Taylor, a major landowner in the Mount Albert area, gifted land along New North Road to the Anglican Church. The name Church of St. Luke was chosen during a community meeting in July 1872, and the church opened in November 1872.

In 1962, the Wagener subdivision, an industrial area of Auckland, was constructed on Saint Lukes Road.

In 1971, the St Lukes Shopping Centre was opened by Prime Minister Keith Holyoake, as the second modern shopping centre in Auckland after LynnMall. The centre was funded by the Mount Albert Borough Council, and was later extended in the early 2000s.

From 2003 to 2011, a large apartment complex called St Lukes Garden was built in the area. Many of the buildings in the complex had issues with leaking, which led to one of the largest court cases dealing with leaky buildings in New Zealand. In 2018, Chemist Warehouse set up their first store in New Zealand in St Lukes.

== Demographics ==
St Lukes covers 0.46 km^{2} (0.18 sq mi) and had an estimated population of 2,190 as of June 2025, with a population density of 4,761 people per km^{2}.

Historical population
Year	Pop.	±% p.a.
2006	1,653	—
2013	2,256	+4.54%
2018	2,391	+1.17%
2023	1,977	−3.73%

St Lukes had a population of 1,977 in the 2023 New Zealand census, a decrease of 414 people (−17.3%) since the 2018 census, and a decrease of 279 people (−12.4%) since the 2013 census. There were 969 males, 984 females and 24 people of other genders in 717 dwellings. 6.4% of people identified as LGBTIQ+. The median age was 32.9 years (compared with 38.1 years nationally). There were 318 people (16.1%) aged under 15 years, 537 (27.2%) aged 15 to 29, 939 (47.5%) aged 30 to 64, and 180 (9.1%) aged 65 or older.

People could identify as more than one ethnicity. The results were 41.7% European (Pākehā); 8.3% Māori; 9.9% Pasifika; 48.1% Asian; 4.6% Middle Eastern, Latin American and African New Zealanders (MELAA); and 1.2% other, which includes people giving their ethnicity as "New Zealander". English was spoken by 90.7%, Māori language by 2.0%, Samoan by 1.7%, and other languages by 40.8%. No language could be spoken by 2.4% (e.g. too young to talk). New Zealand Sign Language was known by 0.9%. The percentage of people born overseas was 54.3, compared with 28.8% nationally.

Religious affiliations were 26.4% Christian, 11.8% Hindu, 4.1% Islam, 0.3% Māori religious beliefs, 3.0% Buddhist, 0.5% New Age, 0.2% Jewish, and 2.0% other religions. People who answered that they had no religion were 47.2%, and 4.9% of people did not answer the census question.

Of those at least 15 years old, 729 (43.9%) people had a bachelor's or higher degree, 597 (36.0%) had a post-high school certificate or diploma, and 327 (19.7%) people exclusively held high school qualifications. The median income was $48,300, compared with $41,500 nationally. 216 people (13.0%) earned over $100,000 compared to 12.1% nationally. The employment status of those at least 15 was that 927 (55.9%) people were employed full-time, 213 (12.8%) were part-time, and 81 (4.9%) were unemployed.

== Amenities ==
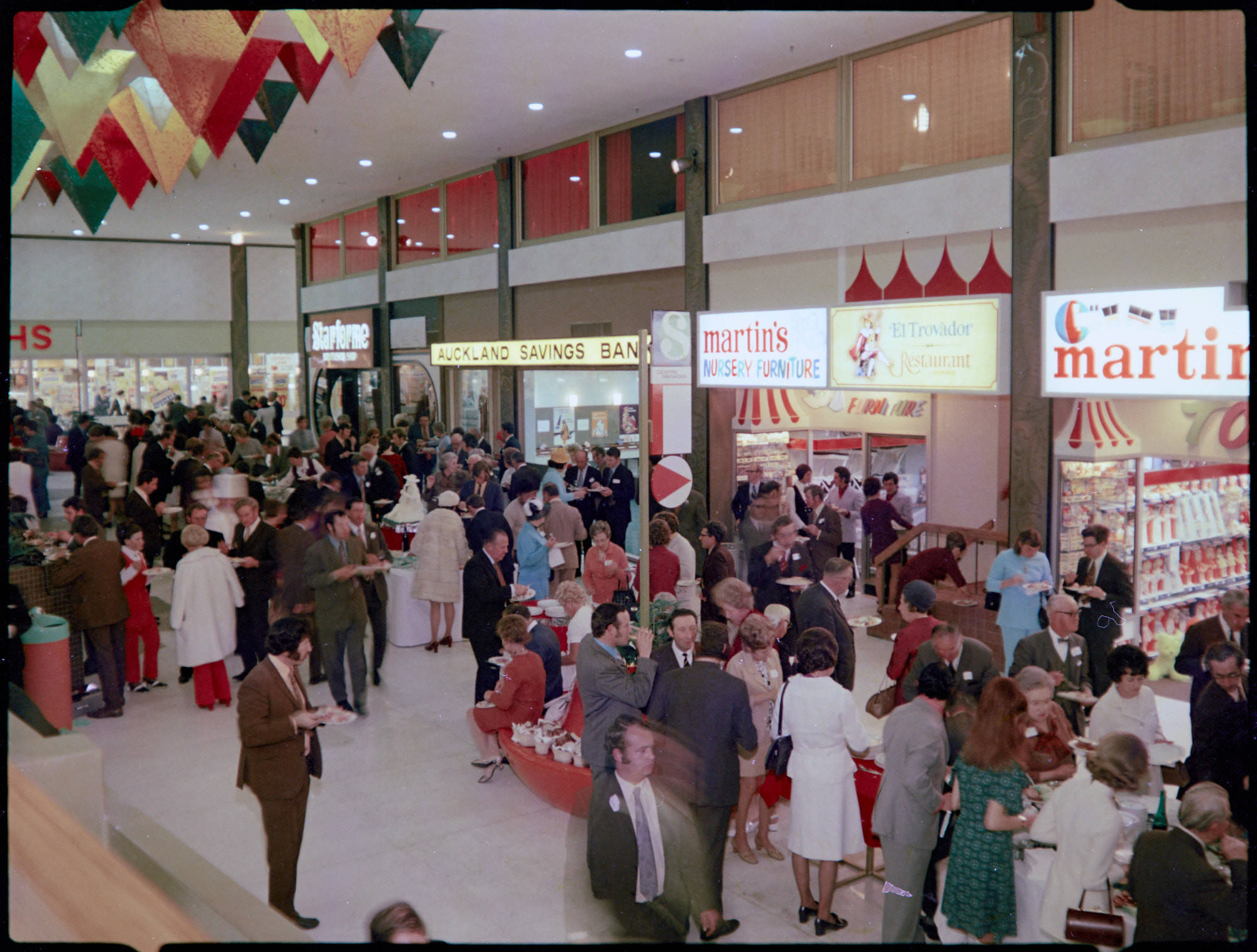
Opening of the St Lukes Shopping Centre in 1971

- Mt Albert Library
- St Luke's Plunket Family Centre
- The Roy Clements Treeway Path, a nature reserve bordering the Meola Creek
- Warren Freer Park, which includes a public playground and is the home of the Ramblers Softball Club
- Westfield St Lukes, a shopping centre in central Auckland

== Education ==
Mount Albert School and Edendale Primary School are contributing primary schools (years 1–6) with rolls of 494 and 490, respectively. Te Kura Kaupapa Māori O Nga Maungarongo is a full primary school (years 1–8) with a roll of 68. It is a Māori language-immersion school. The local state intermediate schools are Kōwhai Intermediate School and Balmoral while the local secondary school is Mount Albert Grammar School.

== Transportation ==
Saint Lukes Road is the major arterial road in the area, which runs between Great North Road, and the Northwestern Motorway, New North Road and Sandringham Road. At this point, the road becomes known as Balmoral Road as it continues through Balmoral, and after crossing St Andrews Road is known as Greenlane.

St Lukes can be reached by public transport by using the OuterLink buses.

== Local government ==
In October 1866, the Mt Albert District Highway Board, the first local government in the area, was formed to administer New North Road and the surrounding areas. In 1911, the board became the Mount Albert Borough, who elected a mayor. In 1978, Mount Albert became a city, and in 1989 it was absorbed into Auckland City. In November 2010, all cities and districts of the Auckland Region were amalgamated into a single body, governed by the Auckland Council.

St Lukes is a part of the Albert-Eden local board area. The residents of Albert-Eden elect a local board, and two councillors from the Albert-Eden-Puketāpapa ward to sit on the Auckland Council.

== Bibliography ==
- Dunsford, Deborah (2016). Mt Albert Then and Now: a History of Mt Albert, Morningside, Kingsland, St Lukes, Sandringham and Owairaka. Auckland: Mount Albert Historical Society. ISBN 978-0-473-36016-0. OCLC 964695277. Wikidata Q117189974.
