= Jordan Todman =

American football player (born 1990)

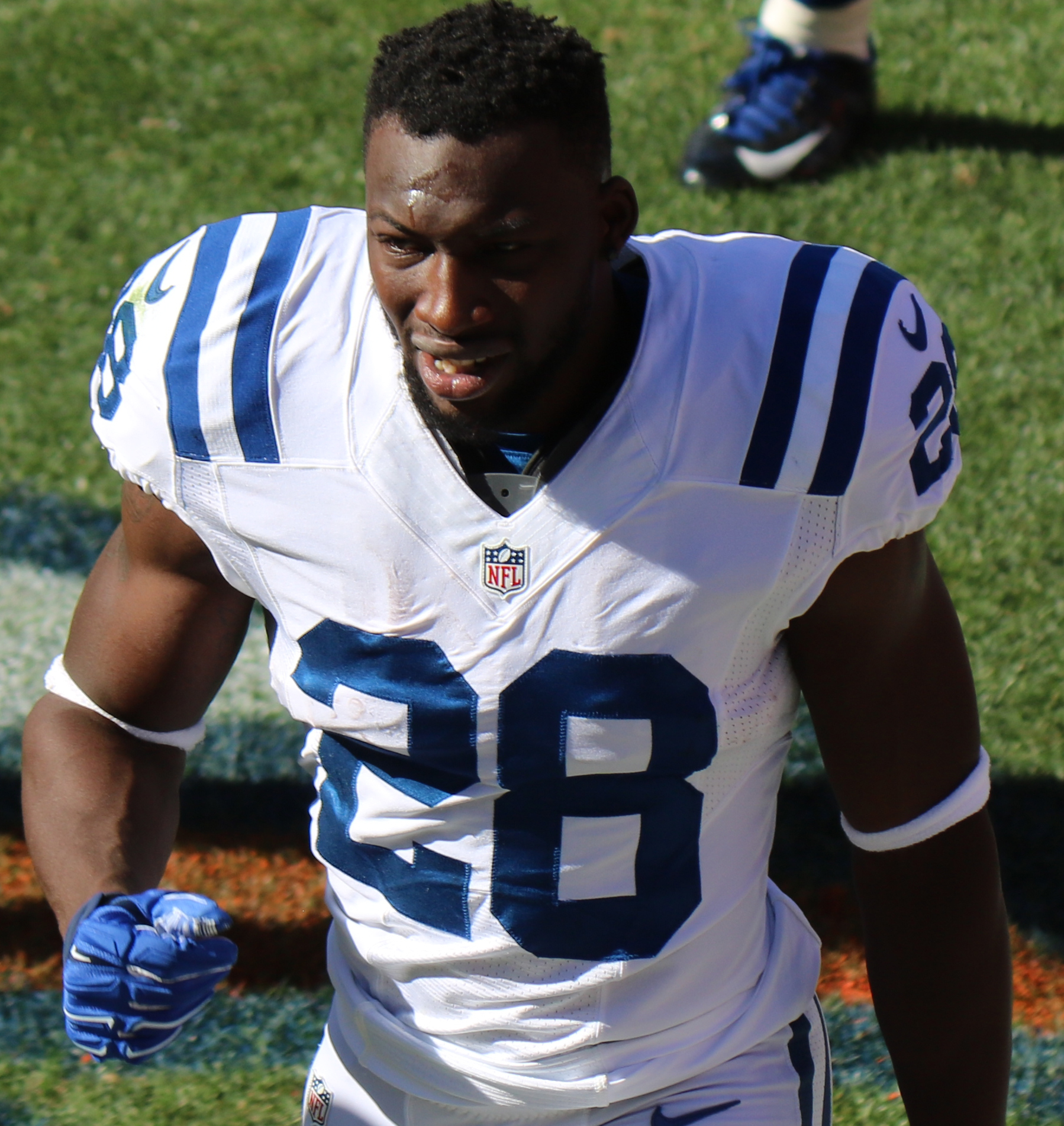
- Todman with the Indianapolis Colts in 2016

No. 30, 28, 22
- Position: Running back

Personal information
- Born: February 24, 1990 (age 36); New Bedford, Massachusetts, U.S.
- Listed height: 5 ft 9 in (1.75 m)
- Listed weight: 200 lb (91 kg)

Career information
- High school: Dartmouth (Dartmouth, Massachusetts)
- College: Connecticut (2008–2010)
- NFL draft: 2011: 6th round, 183rd overall pick

Career history
- San Diego Chargers (2011); Minnesota Vikings (2011–2012); Jacksonville Jaguars (2012–2014); Carolina Panthers (2015)*; Pittsburgh Steelers (2015); Indianapolis Colts (2016); New York Jets (2017)*; Houston Texans (2017)
- * Offseason or practice squad member only

Awards and highlights
- First-team All-American (2010); Big East Offensive Player of the Year (2010); First-team All–Big East (2010); Second-team All–Big East (2009)

Career NFL statistics
- Rushing yards: 531
- Rushing average: 4.3
- Receptions: 40
- Receiving yards: 314
- Return yards: 2,346
- Total touchdowns: 6
- Stats at Pro Football Reference

Jordan Alexander Todman (born February 24, 1990) is an American former professional football player who was a running back in the National Football League (NFL). He played college football for the Connecticut Huskies, earning first-team All-American honors in 2010. Todman was selected by the San Diego Chargers in the sixth round of the 2011 NFL draft. He was also a member of the Minnesota Vikings, Jacksonville Jaguars, Carolina Panthers, Pittsburgh Steelers, Indianapolis Colts, New York Jets, and Houston Texans.

== Early life ==
Todman attended Dartmouth High School in Massachusetts, where he played football, basketball and ran track. He graduated in 2008. In his senior season in 2007, Todman led Dartmouth to a 11–2 record, their only losses coming to a lucky Foxboro High School squad and in the Division 1 State Championship game, where they lost 34–28 in double overtime to perennial power Everett. Including Todman, the 2007 Dartmouth football team had 4 players who received Division 1 scholarships; Todman earned All-State honors twice, and was named the Boston Globe Player of the Year during his senior season.

In track & field, Todman was a state qualifier in the 100-meters. At the 2007 Eastern MA Div 2 Champs, he took gold in the 100-meter dash event, recording a personal-best time of 10.92 seconds. He also competed in jumps.

Though Todman finished his high school career as the second-leading rusher in Massachusetts state history (behind only Cedric Washington of Holyoke), many recruiting sites and college coaches thought he would be best suited to play defense. Despite late interest from Penn State and Boston College, only Connecticut, Purdue and Northeastern offered scholarships. On December 16, 2007, after finishing an official visit to Boston College, Todman committed to play running back for Connecticut.

== College career ==
Todman missed the first two games of his freshman season with a shoulder injury, and made his debut with 81 yards rushing and a touchdown in a UConn victory over Virginia. He would spend the rest of the year as the backup to All-American running back, Donald Brown, and would finish the year with 296 rushing yards and three touchdowns.

After Brown left for the NFL, Todman was promoted to starting running back for his sophomore season. Before the season began, he was named to the Doak Walker Award watch list. Despite splitting carries with Andre Dixon, Todman lead the Huskies with 1,188 rushing yards. He gained over 100 yards in a game five times, including running for 162 yards with 4 touchdowns in a 47–45 loss to Cincinnati. In addition to his running back duties, Todman was also the primary kick returner. In the Huskies victory over Notre Dame, he returned a kickoff 96 yards for a touchdown. After the season, he was named second-team All-Big East.
With Dixon's graduation at the end of the 2009 season, Todman entered his junior season as the team's primary running back. Just as the previous year, he was once again named to the Doak Walker Award watch list. During the regular season, Todman ran for over 100 yards in 9 of the 11 games he played (he missed the Huskies game against Buffalo with an elbow injury). He set a career-high when he ran for 222 yards during a nationally televised game on ESPN against Pittsburgh, on the same day it was announced that he was not named a semi-finalist for the Doak Walker Award. At the end of the regular season, he had 1,574 rushing yards on 302 carriers and 14 rushing touchdowns. Connecticut finished in a three-way tie for the Big East Conference with West Virginia and Pittsburgh, but Connecticut won the tie-breakers and played the Oklahoma Sooners in the 2011 Fiesta Bowl. After the season, Todman was the unanimous selection as Big East Conference's Offensive Player of the Year.

After the Fiesta Bowl, Todman announced that he would forgo his senior season and enter the NFL draft

=== College statistics ===
Year	Team	Att	Yards	Average	TDs	Receptions	Yards	TDs
2008	Connecticut	47	296	6.3	3	2	4	0
2009	Connecticut	235	1,188	5.1	14	21	185	0
2010	Connecticut	334	1,695	5.1	14	19	94	0
Totals		616	3,179	5.2	31	42	283	0

== Professional career ==
Pre-draft measurables
Height	Weight	Arm length	Hand span	Wingspan	40-yard dash	10-yard split	20-yard split	20-yard shuttle	Three-cone drill	Vertical jump	Broad jump	Bench press
5 ft 8 7/8 in (1.75 m)	203 lb (92 kg)	32 in (0.81 m)	9 3/8 in (0.24 m)	6 ft 2 7/8 in (1.90 m)	4.50 s	1.55 s	2.63 s	4.18 s	7.24 s	38.0 in (0.97 m)	10 ft 6 in (3.20 m)	25 reps
All values from NFL Combine

=== San Diego Chargers ===
Todman was selected in the sixth round with the 183rd pick in the 2011 NFL draft by the San Diego Chargers. He was waived on October 22 and re-signed to the practice squad.

=== Minnesota Vikings ===
Todman was signed off the Chargers practice squad by the Minnesota Vikings on December 28, 2011. During the 2012 preseason, Todman had a 76-yard touchdown run against the Houston Texans, but on August 31, 2012, Todman was released by the Vikings and subsequently added to the practice squad the next day.

=== Jacksonville Jaguars ===
Todman was signed off the Vikings practice squad by the Jacksonville Jaguars on November 27, 2012. Todman would spend the rest of the season, as well as the 2013 and 2014 seasons with the Jaguars. He scored his first career touchdown on September 22, 2013, against the Seattle Seahawks. Perhaps the most memorable play for Todman in 2013 was a 21-yard touchdown pass from wide receiver Ace Sanders against the Houston Texans, the first career receiving touchdown for Todman. In 2014, Todman again scored a receiving touchdown on a trick play from a wide receiver; once again the opponent was the Texans. However, this time the 23 yard score was thrown by Cecil Shorts, who joined the Texans the following year. As of the 2018 off-season, these are the only touchdown receptions caught by Todman, with neither pass coming from a quarterback. Despite playing in every game in 2014 for the Jaguars, including a 62-yard touchdown run to defeat the Tennessee Titans in Week 16, Todman was not brought back to the Jaguars.

=== Carolina Panthers ===
On March 30, 2015, Todman was signed to a one-year deal by the Carolina Panthers. Despite leading the Panthers in rushing yards during the preseason, he was released on September 5, 2015.

=== Pittsburgh Steelers ===
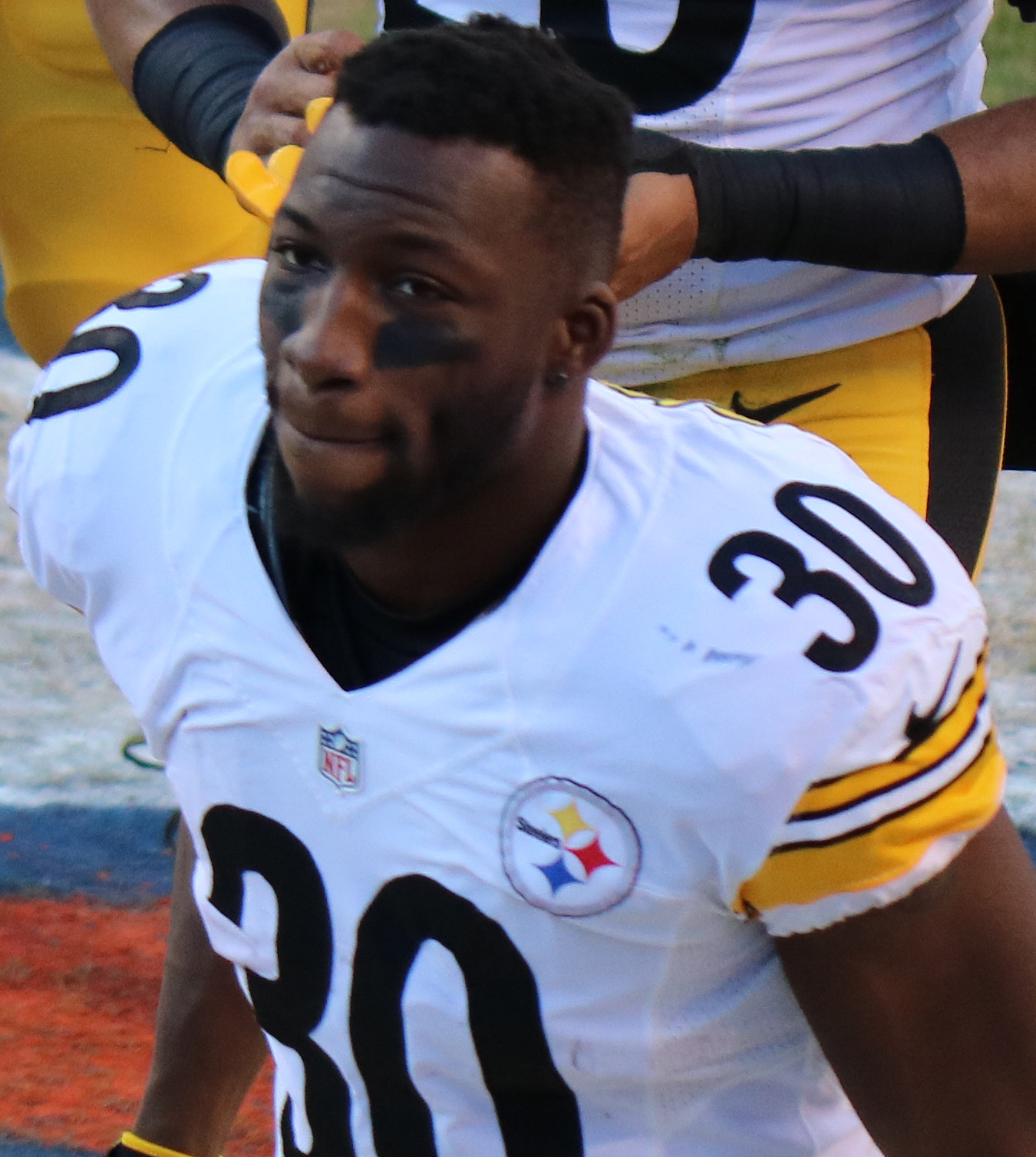
Todman with the Pittsburgh Steelers in Jan. 2016

On September 6, 2015, Todman was signed by the Pittsburgh Steelers, against whom he had rushed for a 49-yard touchdown as a Panther during the final week of the preseason. Todman had 4 rushes all season for 22 yards, but played mostly on special teams, and was inactive for several games late in the regular season. On January 9, 2016, Todman, playing in his first postseason game, carried the ball 11 times for 65 yards while starter Le'Veon Bell and main backup DeAngelo Williams were injured. Along with Fitzgerald Toussaint and Martavis Bryant who took a reverse for 44 yards, the Steelers amassed 172 rushing yards in the 2016 Wild Card game versus the Cincinnati Bengals which resulted in an 18–16 victory for the Pittsburgh Steelers.

=== Indianapolis Colts ===
On March 18, 2016, Todman was signed to the Indianapolis Colts. During the preseason, Todman made several explosive plays on offense (a 42-yard catch and run touchdown, and a 24-yard run) and special teams (a blocked punt recovery for a touchdown). Todman made the 53 player regular season roster and contributed as a core special teams player, until injuries to returner Quan Bray caused Todman's promotion to kick returner. In a Week 9 win over the Green Bay Packers, Todman took the opening kick and scored the first kickoff return touchdown for the Colts since Deji Karim did so in the 2012 season. In addition to this, Todman returned a second kick for 61 yards, setting up an Adam Vinatieri field goal. For his performance in Week 9, he was named the Special Teams Player of the Week on November 9. Todman finished the 2016 season with 9 rushing attempts for 59 yards, averaging 6.6 yards per carry, the highest rate among Colts running backs. Todman also had the highest average return for kickoff returns among the Colts returners, with a 29.9 yard average (16 returns for 478 yards). He played in all 16 games for the Colts.

=== New York Jets ===
On June 13, 2017, Todman signed with the New York Jets. He was released on August 23, 2017.

=== Houston Texans ===
On August 25, 2017, Todman signed with the Houston Texans. Todman played in 14 games, exclusively on special teams where he made several tackles and returned 4 kicks for 84 yards. It was the first season since his rookie year in which Todman had no touches on offense.

== Retirement ==
Todman needed a year and a half to recover from a separated shoulder, suffered on Christmas Day of 2017 while a member of the Texans. During the process, Todman decided to leave football behind. In 2019, Todman served as an assistant coach for the 2019 Jacksonville Dolphins football season, the final in the history of the program prior to being shut down.
