= Steven Reineke =

- Born: September 14, 1970 (age 56); Tipp City, Ohio, U.S.
- Occupations: Conductor and Composer
- Instruments: trumpet, piano
- Years active: 1995–present

Steven Reineke (born September 14, 1970) is a conductor, composer, and arranger from Cincinnati, Ohio. He is the music director of The New York Pops. He currently resides in New York City.

== Biography ==
Reineke was born in 1970 in Tipp City, Ohio and developed an interest in his musical talents at an early age on the trumpet. At age fifteen, he taught himself how to play the piano. He continued his trumpet studies at Miami University in Oxford, Ohio, receiving two Bachelor of Music degrees with honors in both trumpet performance and music composition.

== Career ==
Reineke has established himself as one of North America's leading conductors of popular music. Reineke is the music director of The New York Pops at Carnegie Hall, Principal Pops Conductor of the National Symphony Orchestra at the John F. Kennedy Center for the Performing Arts, Principal Pops Conductor of the Houston Symphony and Toronto Symphony Orchestra. He previously held the posts of Principal Pops Conductor of the Long Beach and Modesto Symphony Orchestras and associate conductor of the Cincinnati Pops Orchestra.

Reineke is a frequent guest conductor with The Philadelphia Orchestra and has been on the podium with the Boston Pops, The Cleveland Orchestra and the Chicago Symphony Orchestra at Ravinia. His extensive North American conducting appearances include San Francisco, Seattle, Edmonton, Pittsburgh, Vancouver, Ottawa (National Arts Centre), Detroit, Milwaukee and Calgary.

On stage, Reineke has created programs and collaborated with a range of leading artists from the world's Hip Hop, Broadway, television and rock including: Common, Kendrick Lamar, Nas, Sutton Foster, Megan Hilty, Cheyenne Jackson, Wayne Brady, Peter Frampton and Ben Folds, amongst others. In 2017 he was featured on National Public Radio's "All Things Considered" leading the National Symphony Orchestra - in a first for the show's 45-year history - performing live music excerpts in between news segments. In 2018 Reineke led the National Symphony Orchestra with hip hop legend Nas performing his seminal album "Illmatic" on PBS's Great Performances.

As the creator of more than one hundred orchestral arrangements for the Cincinnati Pops Orchestra, Reineke's work has been performed worldwide, and can be heard on numerous Cincinnati Pops Orchestra recordings on the Telarc label. His symphonic works Celebration Fanfare, Legend of Sleepy Hollow and Casey at the Bat are performed frequently in North America, including performances by the New York Philharmonic and Los Angeles Philharmonic. His Sun Valley Festival Fanfare was used to commemorate the Sun Valley Summer Symphony's pavilion, and his Festival Te Deum and Swan's Island Sojourn were debuted by the Cincinnati Symphony and Cincinnati Pops Orchestras. His numerous wind ensemble compositions are published by the C.L. Barnhouse Company and are performed by concert bands worldwide.

A native of Ohio, Reineke is a graduate of Miami University of Ohio, where he earned bachelor of music degrees with honors in both trumpet performance and music composition. He currently resides in New York City with his husband Eric Gabbard.

== Compositions ==
Title	Published	Grade	Length	Description
Celebration Fanfare	2008	Advanced	4:33	
Defying Gravity	2004	3.5	5:12	Depicts adventures in the sky above the clouds and fighting their way through a turbulent storm.
Fate of the Gods	2001	4	8:22	Based on the tales from the Nordic mythology.
Goddess of Fire	2006	4.5	9:59	Sets place in Hawaii and depicts a powerful woman Pele, the Goddess of the volcanoes.
Heaven's Light	2004	3.5	3:55	Creates a signal of light of heaven through melodies from the clarinets and flutes. Commissioned for the Evans High School Band in remembrance of band member Holly Spivey.
Hopetown Holiday	1998	3.5	5:24	An exhilarating piece revolving around the journey to the Indicas Reef.
In the Temple of Zion	1997	3.5	5:44	Sets place in Utah with a theme of the Zion National Park.
Into the Raging River	1999	4	7:30	Shows adventures of the white-colored river on a water-rafting trip.
Main Street Celebration	2002	3.5	5:30	Following the tour through the town on the Main Street.
Merry Christmas, Everyone!	2007	3.5	5:19	Contains a medley of classic Christmas songs.
Pilatus: Mountain of Dragons	2002	4.5	10:06	Depicts travelers climbing up the mountain of Pilatus in Switzerland, in hopes to search for dragons.
Portrait of Freedom	2002	4	6:29	
Rise of the Firebird	2001	4	2:33	Energetic fanfare representing the firebird.
River of Life	1995	4	4:48	Creates a melody that sounds like a flow of a relaxing river.
Sedona	2000	3.5	5:36	
Swans Island Sojourn	1996	3.5	6:02	
Symphony No. 1: New Day Rising Mvt. I: City of Gold	2007	5	8:28	Introduces the city of San Francisco and what the city will look like in the 20th century.
Symphony No. 1: New Day Rising Mvt. II: Nocturne	2007	5	6:37	Tells us of the city that sleeps at the night of April 17, 1906 before the imminent earthquake on the next day.
Symphony No. 1: New Day Rising Mvt. III: And the Earth Trembled	2007	5	9:32	Shows the climax of the city during the 1906 San Francisco earthquake at 5:12 A.M. on April 18, 1906.
Symphony No. 1: New Day Rising Mvt. IV: New Day Rising	2007	5	7:13	Depicts the rebuilding of the shattered remains of the city and a day of new hope in the future.
Towards a New Horizon	2007	3.5	6:08	Commissioned by the town of Shoreview, Minnesota, to celebrate their 50th anniversary.
Where Eagles Soar	2003	3.5	4:10	Depicts the freedom of the soaring eagle.
The Witch and the Saint	2004	5	10:22	Conveys the story of the lives of the twin sisters Helena and Sibylla in Germany in 1588.
