= The Witch and the Saint =

Symphonic band piece

The Witch and the Saint by Steven Reineke is a one movement symphonic band piece describing the lives of Helena and Sibylla, fictional twin sisters born in Germany at the end of the 16th century. The story behind the piece is based on the book Die Hexe und die Heilige by Ulrike Schweikert. It is a tone poem written for the Ellwangen Youth Wind Orchestra in Germany. It has five distinct musical sections and was published in 2005.

== Music and story ==
The piece opens with a thundering timpani pickup, beginning the first section. A Gregorian chant type motif follows quietly and builds throughout the brass instrument section, with the euphoniums and French horns playing the melody. This motif is supported by the asymmetrical meter. As the first section progresses, the middle brass and woodwind instruments pick up the melody. The high woodwinds continue the melody, which builds the piece up to the oboe solo. The solo is soft and airy, which contrasts with the very beginning of the piece. The melody of this oboe solo is recurrent and returns three more times in the entire piece. The eight-bar solo ends with the return of the ominous feel before the entire band is made to crescendo enormously. This section describes the birth of twins Helena and Sibylla, and how they learned of their gift to see into the future.

The second section of the song develops Sibylla's theme. In the story of the piece, Sibylla was considered a witch and was feared by the townspeople. In this section, the piece speeds up dramatically and is in 5/4 time. The primary melody is initially established by the low woodwind and brass sections. The flutes and clarinets play this melody afterward. As the section progresses, more instruments begin playing the melody, which builds the texture that is growing uneasy. The climax of the section is very Medieval sounding, and most of the band unites to play the same melody. This is followed by a transition section that follows a Gregorian chant style, similar to the first section.

At the beginning of the third section, there is a key change. This section develops Helena's theme. Helena was sent to a convent when she was young, and her gift of second sight made her gain value as a saint. Helena's theme is the same melody as the oboe solo in the first section. Helena's theme is much more peaceful than Sibylla's, establishing the different ways society perceived each of the twins. At the end of this section, the key changes to what it was at the beginning of the piece.

The fourth section speeds up drastically, and has a mixed meter. This section represents the struggles that both of the sisters experienced in their lives. Sibylla is imprisoned for being a witch, which is symbolized through the middle and high wind sections picking a note, and the uneven meter. The piece drastically cuts itself off, marking the beginning of the final section.

The final section begins with the final use of Helena's theme. This time, it is heroic, and very full of hope. In the story, Helena has returned from the convent in order to save her sister, Sibylla. However, Helena fails, leading to both sisters being captured. The sisters fear being burnt at the stake, so the saint, Helena, drinks some poison. Sibylla manages to escape, and rides sorrowfully off into the distance.

== Reception ==
Plainly, this piece has gained much popularity by conductors, performers, and audiences. Performers find the piece very satisfying as each instrument is given independence. Instruments such as the tenor saxophone, bass clarinet, euphonium and the French horn have numerous solos, so the audience's attention is dispersed evenly across the band. Many different sections have their own part in the melody including the saxophone, the clarinet, and the percussion section. Conductors favor this piece due to challenging chords, strange time signatures, but most importantly, the independence of instruments normally overshadowed.

== Instrumentation ==
Woodwinds
Piccolo, Flutes 1 & 2, Oboe, Bassoon, B♭ Clarinets 1, 2 & 3, B♭ Bass Clarinet, E♭ Alto Saxophones 1 & 2, B♭ Tenor Saxophone, E♭ Baritone Saxophone
Brass
B♭ Trumpets 1, 2 & 3, French horns 1 & 2, Trombones 1, 2 & 3, Euphonium, Tuba
Strings
String Bass (optional)
Percussion
Mallet percussion & tambourine, Timpani, Cymbals & triangle, Snare Drum & Bass Drum, auxiliary percussion
