= Westfield St Lukes =

Coordinates: 36.883139°S 174.733332°E

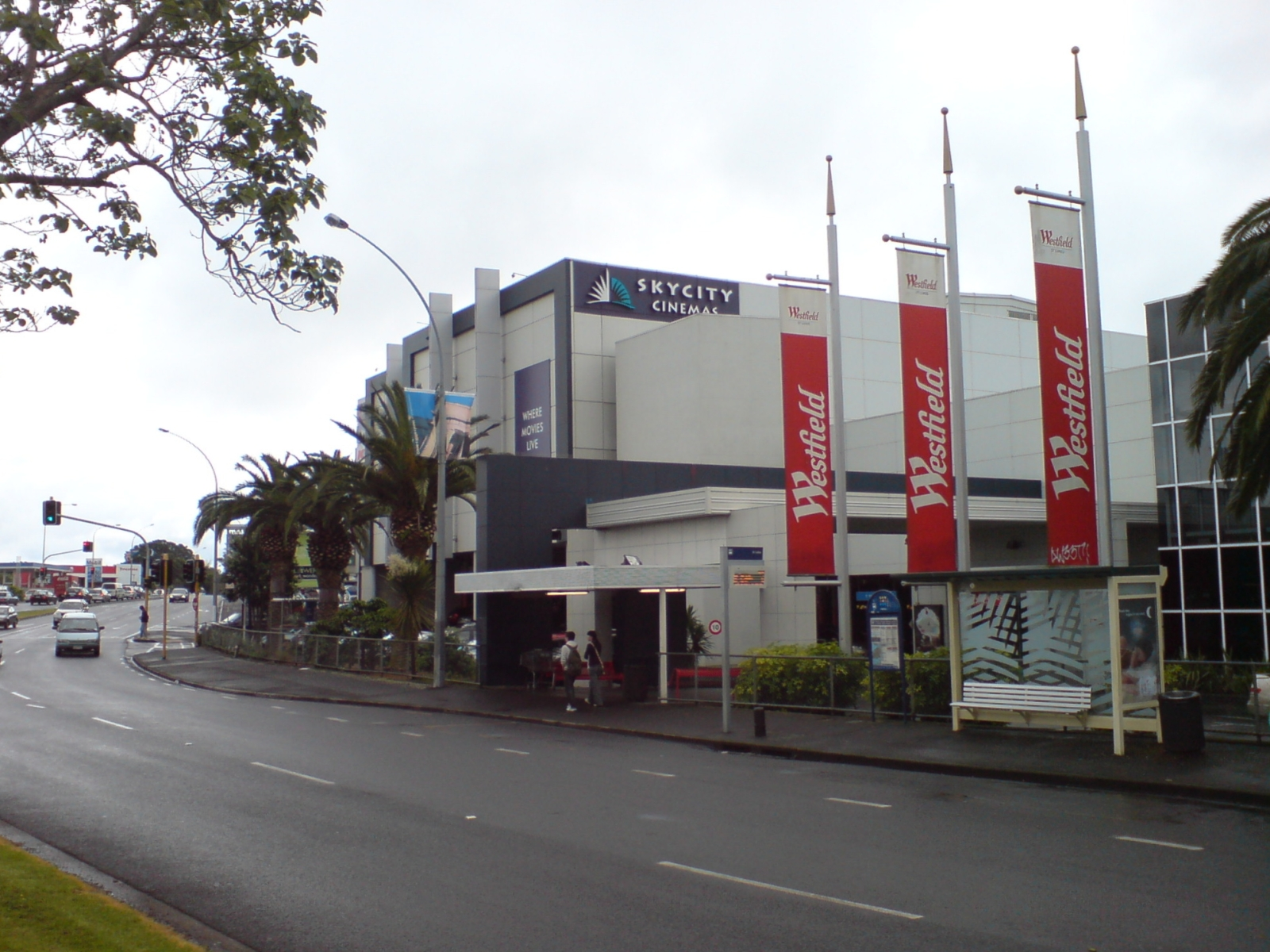
- Looking from the southeast
- Location: Mount Albert, Auckland, New Zealand
- Address: St. Lukes Road
- Opened: September 22, 1971; 55 years ago
- Developer: Westfield Group
- Owner: Scentre Group
- Num. of stores: 167
- Num. of anchor tenants: 4
- Floor area: 43,000 m^{2} (460,000 sq ft)
- Floors: 2
- Parking: 2,000+
- Website: Westfield St. Lukes

Westfield St Lukes, one of the big three shopping centres in the western suburbs of Auckland, New Zealand, stands on St Lukes Road in the suburb of St Lukes, Mount Albert. It receives about 6 million shopper visits annually. With 43,000 m^{2} gross floor area (2002 data), it features a Farmers, Kmart, Woolworths, an Event Cinemas 8 screen cinema complex and over 160 shops.

The centre opened on 22 September 1971 and is one of the oldest in New Zealand. About 100,000 people visited it on opening day. Westfield invested around NZ$55 million in the early 2000s to extend and renovate the centre.

In a 2008 rating of New Zealand shopping centres by a retail expert group, Westfield St Lukes received three and a half stars, just under the maximum rating of four stars, based on the criteria of amount of shopping area, economic performance, amenity and appeal as well as future growth prospects.

Annual sales for the full year 2018 were $363.1 million.

== Transport ==
Westfield St Lukes has various bus connections to different parts of the Central Auckland area, notably the OuterLink, 64 and 65 buses which stop outside the mall on St Lukes Road. The 20, 22N and 22R buses also service the mall, with stops on Morningside Drive. The nearest train station is at Morningside.

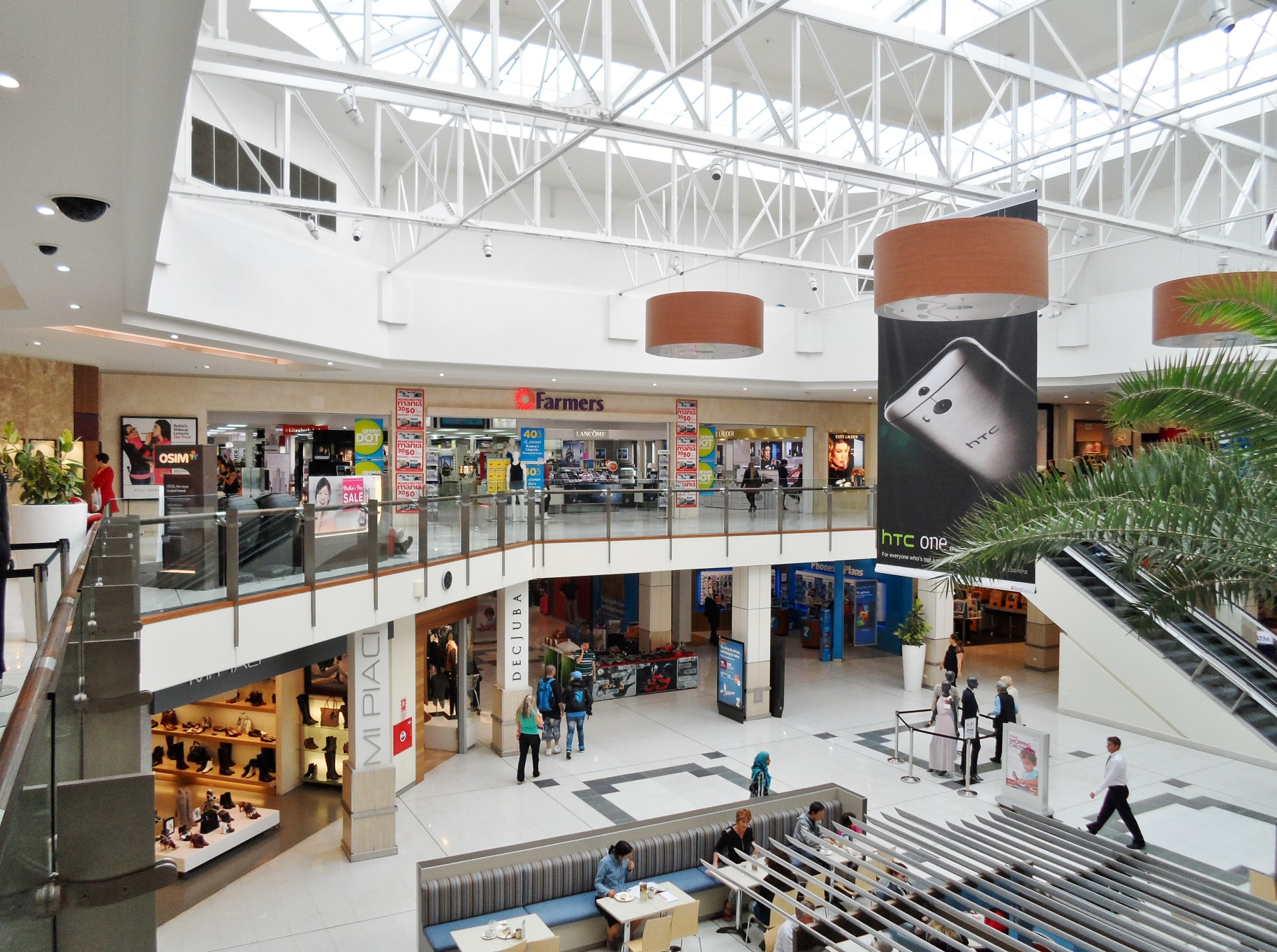
Interior, showing anchor tenant Farmers and other shops

The mall carpark has 2,018 spaces.

== Expansion plans ==
In 2009, Westfield applied for a change to the District Plan which would allow the shopping centre to be extended to 92,500m^{2}, with up to 77,500m^{2} of shops and cafes as well as 15,000m^{2} of office space and up to six storeys of building – which would make the centre larger than any other shopping centre in New Zealand. Westfield already owned much of the properties in the north of the site, where it wanted to expand, but some neighbours and groups announced they would fight the mall expansion, primarily because of the extra traffic effects.

== See also ==
- List of shopping centres in New Zealand
