= St. Luke Elementary School =

Catholic primary school in Waterloo, Canada

Coordinates: 43.5094°N 80.5045°W

St. Luke Catholic Elementary School

Location
- 550 Chesapeake Drive; Waterloo, Ontario; Canada

Information
- Motto: "Rooted in the Love of Christ"
- Religious affiliation: Roman Catholic
- Established: 2001
- School board: Waterloo Catholic District School Board
- Grades: Junior Kindergarten (JK) - Eighth grade
- Language: English, French
- Colours: Navy Blue, Gray, and White
- Team name: Lightning
- Website: www.wcdsb.ca/st-luke-catholic-elementary-school/

== Overview ==
St. Luke Elementary School is a Catholic primary school in the Eastbridge neighbourhood of Waterloo, Ontario, Canada. The school is located at 550 Chesapeake Drive and instructs students from Junior Kindergarten (JK) to the Eighth grade.

== History ==
St. Luke opened in 2001 due to a growth in the region, as a part of the Waterloo Catholic District School Board. It is one of the feeder schools for St. David Catholic Secondary School, although students may choose to enroll in other secondary schools. It was originally designed for 400 students, but the plan was extended to accommodate 550 students. However there were some delays during construction due to strikes from Waterloo North Hydro.

== Religious Influence ==
The school is named after Luke the Evangelist, the patron saint of artists, physicians, surgeons, students and butchers, and the author of the Gospel according to Luke. The school's motto is: "Rooted in the Love of Christ", which reflects its Christian values. The local Parish for the school is St. Agnes Parish, which supports the school's Sacramental programs.

== Childcare ==
While not affiliated with St. Luke School, RisingOaks Early Learning provides childcare from 6:30 a.m. - 6:00 p.m. and from ages 18 months to 12 years old.

== Sports ==
The school's sports teams are known as the "St. Luke Lightning".
