= St Luke's University =

St Luke's University may refer to:

- St. Luke's International University, formerly St. Luke's College of Nursing, a private university in Tokyo, Japan
- St. Luke's College of Nursing, Trinity University of Asia, in the Philippines
- St Luke's Campus of the University of Exeter, England
- St. Luke's University, a fictional university in Bristol, England, depicted in the British science fiction TV series Doctor Who

== See also ==
- St. Luke's University Health Network, group of hospitals in Pennsylvania, United States
