= Southcoast Health System =

Southcoast Health is an affiliation of three partner hospitals located in the southeastern portion of Massachusetts. The organization was founded in June 1996. The three partner hospitals had been in talks for a merger since late 1995 after pressure from healthcare organizations in the Providence and Boston areas. As of December 2021, SouthCoast Health employs over 7500 employees across the entire system.

== Partner Hospitals ==
Southcoast Health Hospitals

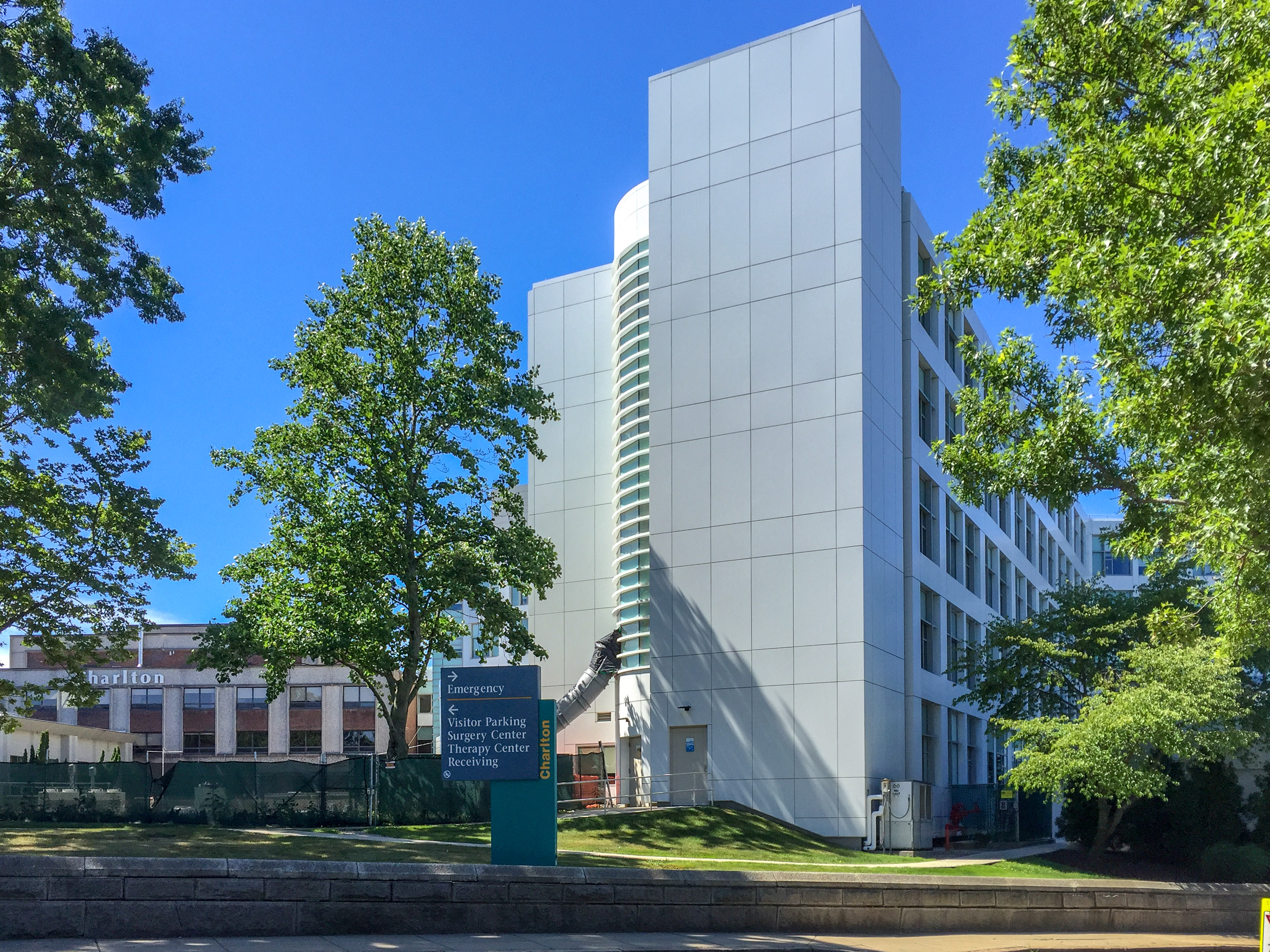
Charlton Hospital

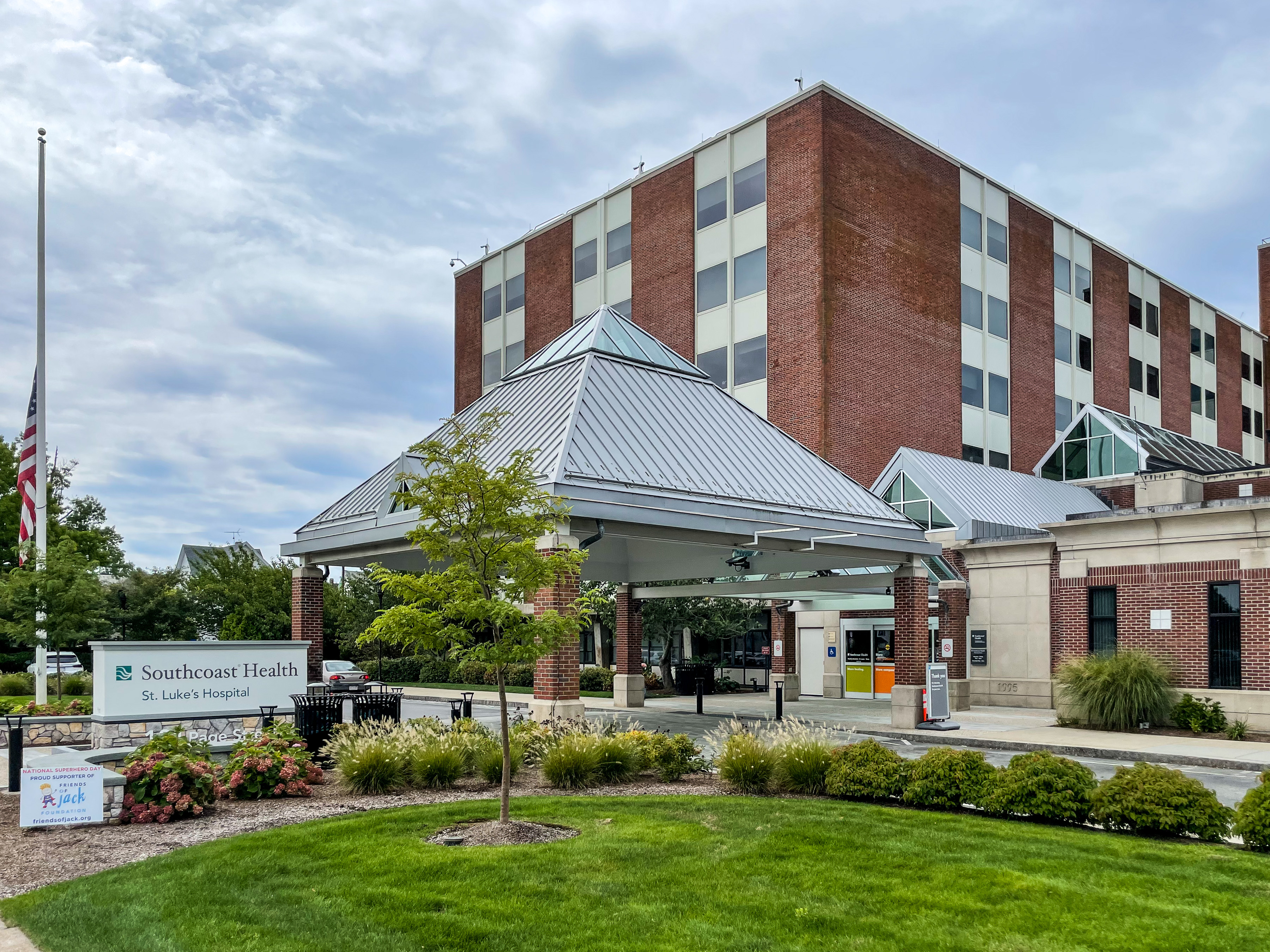
St. Luke's Hospital

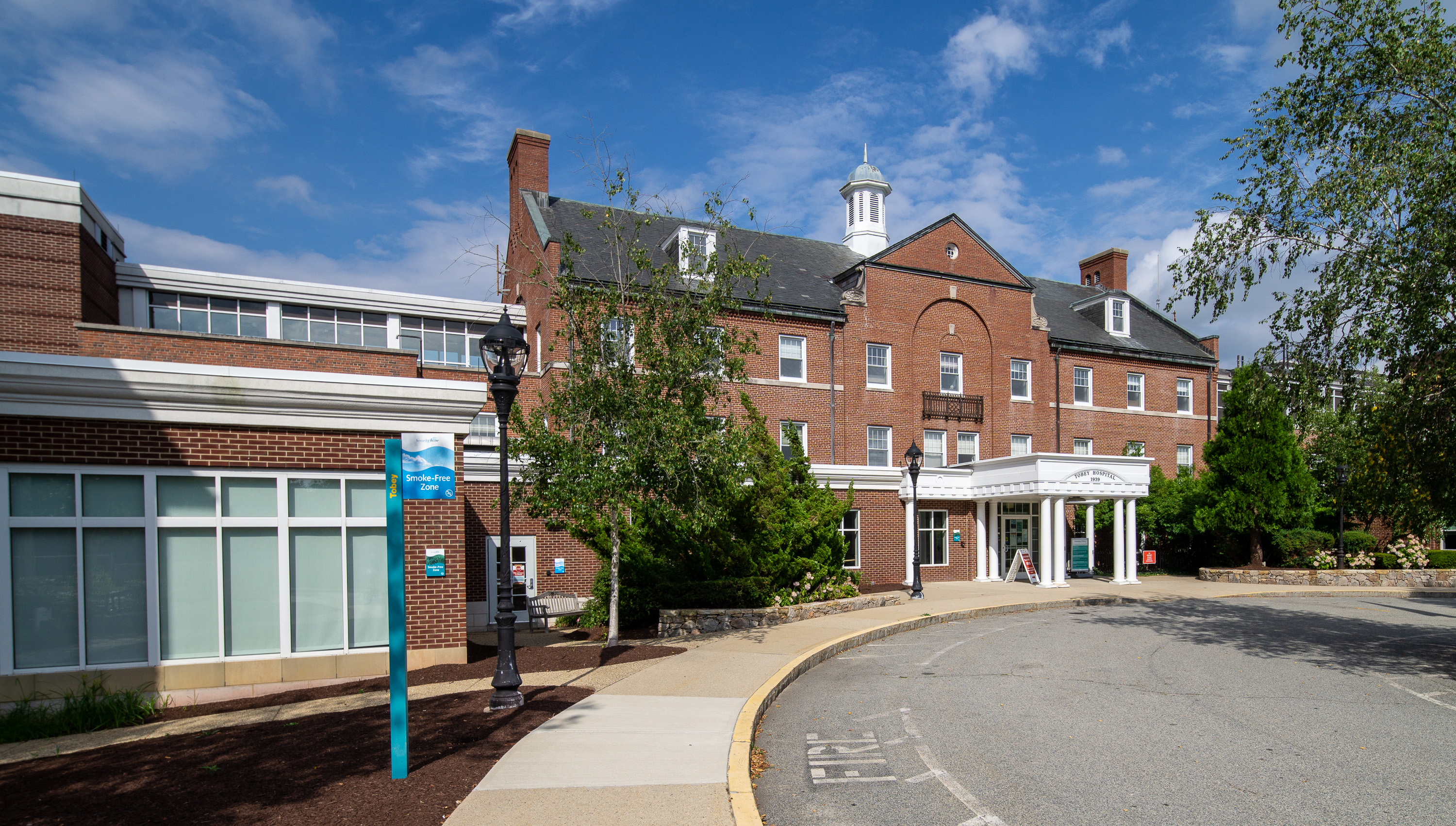
Tobey Hospital

=== Charlton Memorial Hospital ===
Charlton Memorial Hospital in Fall River has provided continuous service to the community since 1885. The hospital is located in Fall River, Massachusetts in Bristol County and treats all members and non-members of the surrounding area. Charlton Memorial Hospital provides healthcare services including a cancer center, ambulatory center, cardiovascular health services, surgical and rehabilitative care. In July 2021, the hospital unveiled a brand-new cardiovascular care center, complete with renovations and new medical technology.

=== St. Luke's Hospital ===
St. Luke's Hospital in New Bedford was founded in 1884 through the principal efforts of Anna M. Lumbard, a local philanthropist. Southcoast Health has expanded its affiliation with Boston Children's Hospital to include the Level II nurseries at Charlton Memorial Hospital in Fall River and St. Luke's Hospital in New Bedford Massachusetts.

=== Tobey Hospital ===
Tobey Hospital in Wareham was founded in 1938. The hospital is named after Alice Tobey Jones, from whose estate funds to develop the hospital originated. Tobey Hospital has provided continuous service to the community since 1940. In August 2014, Southcoast Health opened a new Urgent Care building in the surrounding communities of Wareham near Tobey Hospital and Southcoast Health at Rosebrook. On August 26, 2019, the nearby Tobey Homestead was demolished to make way for the expansion of the Tobey Hospital Emergency Department.
