= Martyrs of Caesarea =

The Catholic Church recognizes the individuals of Lucius, Absalom, and Lorgius as Saints due to their recorded suffering and death in Caesarea, a location within Cappadocia. St. Lucius (perhaps alternately Lucas or Luke) is thought to have been a bishop of Spanish heritage. Unfortunately, little is known about these Christian martyrs, with even their names being uncertain, although they are commemorated during the holy calendar day of March 2.

This Lucius is also not to be confused with the multiple other individuals of the same name, such as Lucius of Cyrene. As well, this Lorgius is also known as Largus and this Absalom as Absalon, Absolom, and Absolucius. Details about when they died is unknown. However, the three appear in the Martyrology of Usuard, meaning that accounts of them existed at least before or during the Usuard's time in the 9th century.

"At Caesarea, in Cappadocia, the holy martyrs Lucius the Bishop, Absolom, Lorgius" is a part of the William Blackwood & Sons published English language version of the Roman Breviary, the liturgical book of the rites of the Catholic Church containing hymns, readings, notations, and other religious material.

None of them are to be confused or connected with the unrelated 3rd-century figure Mammes of Caesarea and 4th-century figure Dorothea of Caesarea, besides them all being martyred in the same general area.

The historical region in which they died in Central Anatolia is now a part of modern Turkey. That city of Caesarea (called Caesarea Mazaca) is not to be confused with the traditional Jewish town of the same name, which is in modern Israel, or other locations of related names.

== Absalon of Caesarea ==
Absalon of Caesarea

Saint
- Died: c. 100 AD; Caesarea
- Venerated in: Christian church
- Feast: March 2

Absalon of Caesarea is a Christian saint and martyr who lived in the first century AD.

He is reported as having been martyred at Caesarea, with his companions Bishop Lucius and Lorgius. Their names are uncertain, Lucius is sometimes written as Lucas, Lorgius turned to be Largus, and Absalon as Absolucius. But one thing is known for sure they all lived in Cappadocia in the first century. His feast day is celebrated on March 2.

== Lorgius ==
Lorgius

Saint
- Died: c. 100 AD; Caesarea
- Venerated in: Christian church
- Feast: March 2

Lorgius (in Italian and Spanish: Lorgio) was martyred at Caesarea Mazaca, Cappadocia. Lorgius is also known as "Largus."

== See also ==
- List of Christian martyrs
- List of Saints
