= St. Luke's Hospital (New Bedford, Massachusetts) =

Coordinates: 41.6265°N 70.9380°W

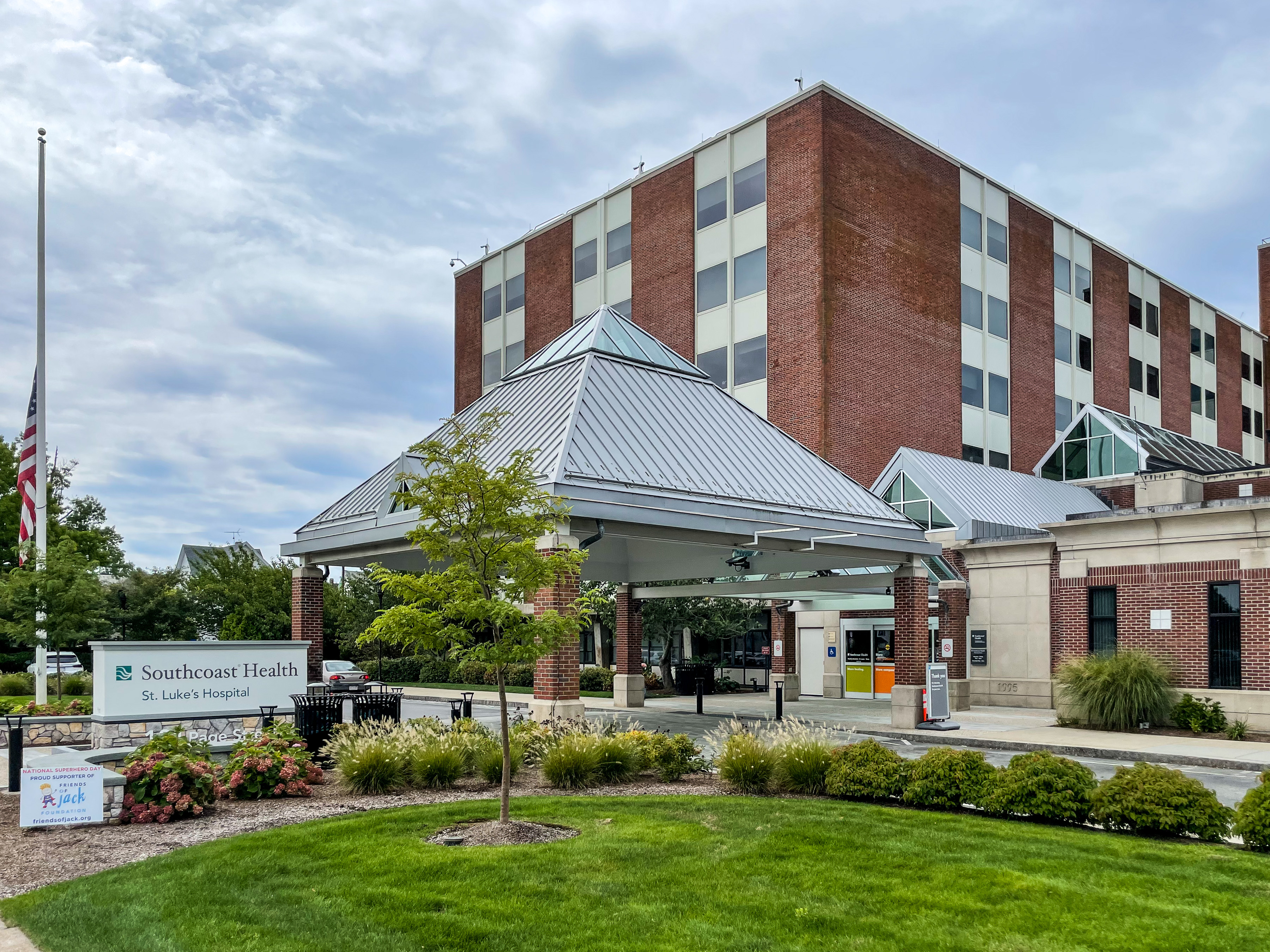

Geography
- Location: New Bedford, Massachusetts, United States

Services
- Emergency department: Level II Trauma Center
- Beds: 360

Helipads
- Helipad: FAA LID: 5MA6
Number	Length		Surface
Number	ft	m	Surface
H1	60	18	Concrete, rooftop

Links
- Website: https://www.southcoast.org/
- Lists: Hospitals in Massachusetts

St. Luke's Hospital is a Massachusetts hospital located at 101 Page Street in New Bedford, Massachusetts.

== History ==
The hospital was founded in 1884 by the Protestant Episcopal church with significant financial contributions from Horatio Hathaway, a church leader and one of the founders of Berkshire Hathaway.

In 1996, St. Luke's merged with Charlton Memorial in Fall River and Tobey Hospital in Wareham to form the Southcoast Health System.

In 2006, St. Luke's began constructing a new Emergency Department, which includes nineteen new private treatment bays. In 2008, the In-House Patient Pharmacy Department installed a drug dispensing system throughout the floors called Pyxis Connect. Operations continued in 2009 with upgrades to the OR rooms and Endoscopy Departments, which received new machines in each room.

== Services ==
St. Luke's has 293 beds in service and offers in-patient medical and surgical services, including neurosurgery, cardiology, pediatric care, orthopedics, and general surgery.
