= San Lucas =

San Lucas (the Spanish-language name of St. Luke) is sometimes used as a toponym:

Belize
- San Lucas, Belize, a village in Toledo District, Belize

Colombia
- Serrania of San Lucas (mountains)

Costa Rica
- San Lucas Island

Guatemala
- San Lucas Sacatepéquez (Sacatepéquez department)
- San Lucas Tolimán (Sololá department)

Honduras
- San Lucas, El Paraíso

Mexico
- San Lucas, Chiapas
- San Lucas, Michoacán
- San Lucas Tecopilco, Tlaxcala
- San Lucas Quiavini, Oaxaca
- San Lucas Zoquiapam, Oaxaca
- Cabo San Lucas, Baja California Sur

Nicaragua
- San Lucas, Madriz

United States
- San Lucas, California
  - San Lucas AVA, California wine region in Monterey County
