= Spark Arena =

Multipurpose arena in New Zealand

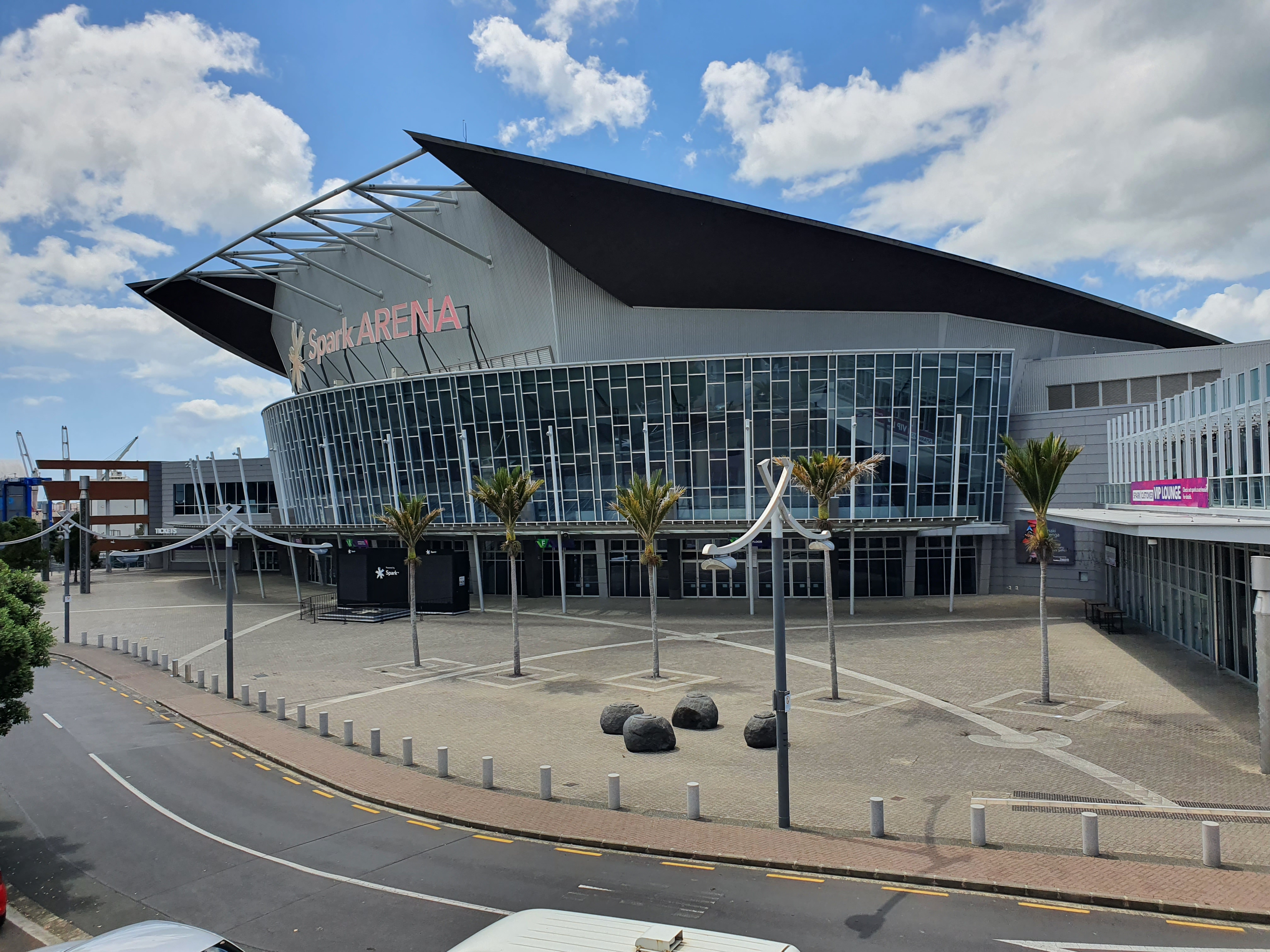
- Interactive map of Spark Arena
- Former names: Auckland City Arena (planning/construction); Vector Arena (2007–17)
- Address: 42-80 Mahuhu Cres; Parnell, Auckland 1010; New Zealand
- Location: Quay Park, Auckland CBD
- Coordinates: 36.8471738°S 174.7769451°E
- Owner: Live Nation Entertainment
- Operator: Quay Park Arena Management
- Capacity: 13,280; 9,740 (basketball)
- Record attendance: 12,798 (October 26, 2026; Zara Larsson)

Construction
- Groundbreaking: 7 June 2004; 22 years ago
- Opened: 24 March 2007; 19 years ago
- Cost: NZ$ 94.8 million
- Architects: Peddle Thorp; Crawford Architects
- Structural engineer: Holmes Consulting Group
- General contractor: Mainzeal
- Main contractors: Dominion Constructors; Ortech Industries

Tenant
- New Zealand Breakers (NBL) (2012–present)

Website
- www.sparkarena.co.nz

Spark Arena (also known as Auckland City Arena, and formerly as Vector Arena) is a multipurpose arena in Auckland, New Zealand. The venue is located at Quay Park, Parnell, very close to Waitematā railway station and The Strand Station. The arena cost approximately $94 million, and of this sum ratepayers contributed $68 million for the facility to be managed by QPAM, the NZ operator, in New Zealand's first big public-private partnership. This runs for 40 years before ownership is transferred to the city.

After delays due to construction-related issues, the arena's first concert was Rock Star Supernova on 24 March 2007.

== Naming rights ==
During planning and construction, the venue was called Auckland City Arena. Vector Limited held the naming rights from the venue's opening in 2007 until April 2017, during which time it was called Vector Arena. On 19 April 2017, Spark New Zealand took over the naming rights, renaming the venue Spark Arena.

== Ownership ==
Quay Park Arena Management Ltd was incorporated in 2002 to construct and operate the stadium, in a deal between the company's owners and the then Auckland City Council. In 2005, the company was renamed QPAM Ltd. QPAM has ultimately been owned by EVENZ Limited since 2012. Shares in EVENZ were purchased by American company Live Nation Entertainment and Australian company MHC Investments after approval by the Overseas Investment Office in August 2016.

== Sports ==
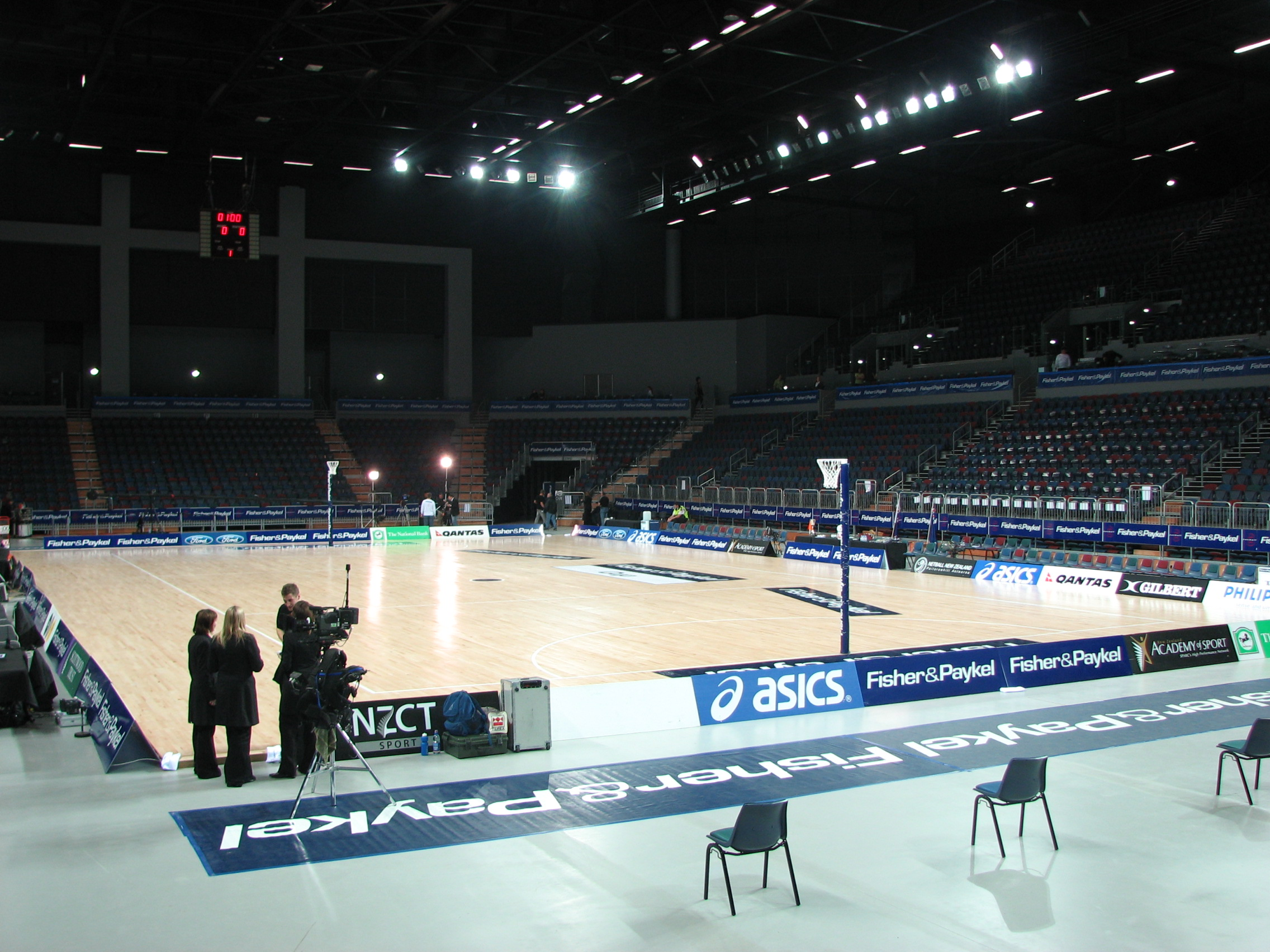
The Arena in a netball setup

Netball

Netball is regularly played at the venue with the New Zealand Silver Ferns playing on several occasions while the ANZ Championship has also used the arena on two occasions since 2010. The arena hosted the 2012-2014 Fast5 Netball World Series.

Professional wrestling

Since 2008 Vector Arena has also been a regular host of World Wrestling Entertainment's tours of New Zealand, with Raw, SmackDown and ECW all performing at the venue.

Ice hockey

In 2011 some 10,000 fans saw an ice hockey international between Canada and the United States on a $4.2m temporary ice rink.

Basketball

The arena announced that it would host its first National Basketball League game on 28 October 2011 when the defending champion New Zealand Breakers hosted the Sydney Kings in Round 4 of the 2011–12 NBL season. The arena hosted two more Breakers games during the season, against the Townsville Crocodiles in Round 8 (24 November) and the Kings in Round 17 (27 January 2012).

That first NBL game at Vector Arena drew a New Zealand record crowd for a basketball game when 6,900 saw the NZ Breakers defeat the Kings 76-59. This record was again broken in Round 17, when 7,979 saw the Breakers again defeat the Kings 93-64.

On 13 March 2012 New Zealand Breakers General Manager Richard Clarke announced that due to the amount of support for the team, all Breakers finals games would be played at Vector Arena with capacity set at 8,500, subject to demand, with extra seating to be sold if needed. The Breakers finished the 2011-12 season as minor premiers giving them home court advantage in all finals series'. The Breakers qualified for the 2011-12 NBL Grand Final against the Perth Wildcats with games 1 and 3 being played at the arena. Game 1 saw the attendance record for a basketball game in New Zealand broken, with 9,125 seeing the Breakers win 104-98 in overtime. With the Wildcats winning game 2 in Perth 87-86, game 3 was required and the Breakers won their second straight NBL Championship with a 79-73 win in front of another record crowd of 9,285.

Before the 2012-13 NBL season, the Breakers confirmed that they would play five regular season games at Vector Arena. The first game, played in front of 6,625 fans, saw the home side defeat the Adelaide 36ers 73-59 on 12 October. The four other games at the arena during the regular season were on 16 November (Townsville), 13 December (Cairns Taipans), 1 February 2013 (Perth) and 14 March 2013 (Melbourne Tigers).

The Breakers once again broke their attendance record during Game 1 of the 2012-13 NBL Grand Final series against the Perth Wildcats when a capacity 9,330 fans saw the home team defeat the Wildcats 79-67. The team ultimately won their third successive NBL title.

For the 2013–14 NBL season, the Breakers played half of their home games at Vector Arena, totalling seven appearances at the arena. The Breakers game against the Adelaide 36ers on 15 November 2013 saw the home side's first ever loss at the arena, in front of 7,470 fans. The Breakers then lost their second game at the venue when they were defeated 71-62 by the Perth Wildcats on 13 December 2013 in front of 7,597 fans.

BMX

The 32nd BMX World Championships, attracted over two thousand riders from 33 countries, was held in the then Vector Arena over the week of 24–28 July 2013. Construction of the track took six days involving approximately 10,000 pallets and 60 truck and trailer loads of dirt. The confines meant there was insufficient room to build two separate ramps, so a hydraulic movable one was built to allow the ramp to be moved from 5 metre height to 8 metres.

Mixed martial arts

The arena hosted its first UFC for UFC Fight Night: Te Huna vs. Marquardt with over 8000 seats filled in attendance on 28 June 2014, the first UFC event in New Zealand. On 11 June 2017, the arena held UFC Fight Night: Lewis vs. Hunt. On 23 February 2020 it hosted UFC Fight Night: Felder vs. Hooker which featured New Zealand fighter Dan Hooker in the main event, and drew over 10,000 fans.

Boxing

The arena played host to its first boxing event on 10 December 2016: Joseph Parker vs Andy Ruiz for the vacant WBO World Heavyweight Title. This was New Zealand's first male world title and first heavyweight world title fight hosted in New Zealand, and New Zealand's second major world title fight, the first being Kali Reis vs Maricela Cornejo for the vacant WBC World Female Middleweight title on 16 April 2016 at The Trusts Arena.

== Other events ==
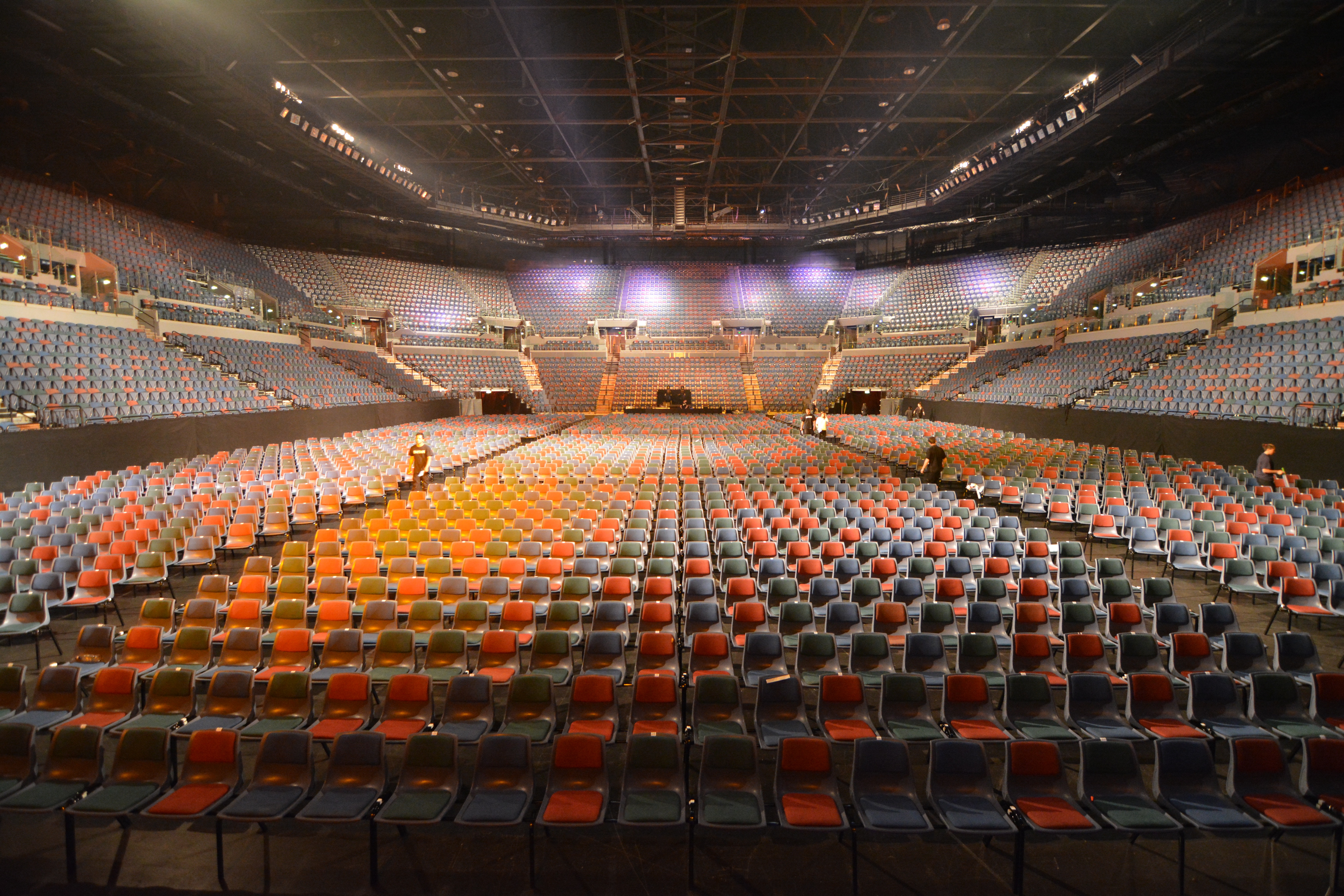
Arena interior in seated mode

Other performers such as comedians Jeff Dunham, Billy Connolly and Russell Brand have performed at the arena. Feld Entertainment's Disney on Ice shows also play here every year in August.

Evangelist Benny Hinn staged his mass gathering at the venue on 9 June 2007.

Mike Tyson was due to bring his Day of Champions tour to the Vector Arena in 2012, but he was not granted a visa to enter the country due to his previous criminal convictions.

The exterior of the building has been used for battle scenes in the Power Rangers series.

In mid-August 2021, Spark Arena hosted retail company Mitre 10's 2021 Awards ceremony which was attended by a thousand people including TVNZ broadcaster Hilary Barry. On 20 August, a bar worker tested positive for COVID-19. Consequently, participants were ordered to isolate at home.

== Attendance Records ==
On 26 October 2026, Zara Larsson's Midnight Sun Tour broke Spark Arena's attendance record for an overall single event, with 12,798 tickets sold. P!NK on the Beautiful Trauma World Tour holds the record for most attendance on a residency with 73,087 total attendees across 6 shows. Bruno Mars holds the attendance record for 4 shows on his 24K Magic World Tour in 2018 with 48,783.

UFC holds the record for largest attendance for a sporting event, with the UFC Fight Night: Felder vs. Hooker garnering 10,025 attendees. In 2023, the NBL Grand Final became the most attended basketball game with 9,742 attendees.

== See also ==
- List of indoor arenas in New Zealand
