= Ted Brimble =

New Zealand rugby league player

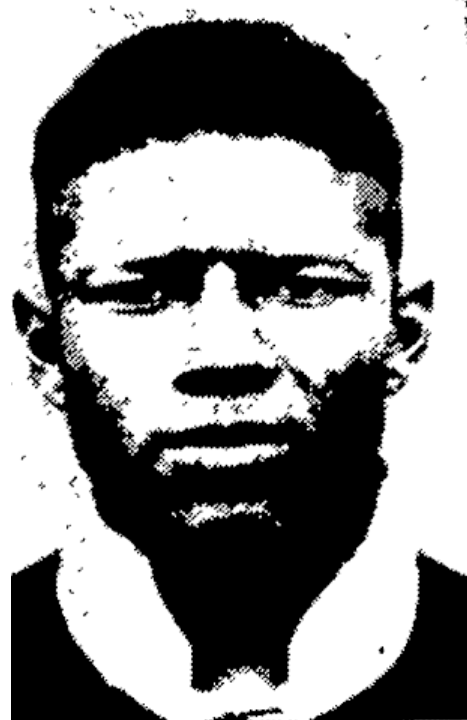

Personal information
- Full name: Edward Pierrepont Brimble
- Born: 27 June 1910 Molteno, Eastern Cape, South Africa
- Died: 27 June 1968 (aged 58) Auckland, New Zealand

Playing information
- Weight: 10 st 7 lb (67 kg)

Rugby union
- Position: Five-Eighth, Centre
Club
Years	Team	Pld	T	G	FG	P
1928–30	Manukau Rovers	24	4	0	2	18

Rugby league
- Position: Stand-off
Club
Years	Team	Pld	T	G	FG	P
1930–1940	Newton Rangers	151	39	5	0	127
1930	NZ Fertiliser (comp.)	5	0	0	0	0
1939	Randwick (Wellington)	1	0	0	0	0
	Total	157	39	5	0	127
Representative
Years	Team	Pld	T	G	FG	P
1932	New Zealand Trials	2	0	0	0	0
1932	New Zealand	1	0	0	0	0
1932–1935	Auckland	8	1	0	0	3
1932	Auckland XIII	1	0	0	0	0
1933–1935	Auckland Trial	2	0	0	0	0
1936–1939	Auckland (Tāmaki) Māori	4	0	0	0	0
1936	Taranaki XIII	1	0	0	0	0
- Relatives: Walter Brimble (brother); Wilfred Brimble (brother)

Edward (Ted) Pierrepont Brimble (27 June 1910 – 27 June 1968) was a rugby league player who represented New Zealand in 1932. He played one test against England. In the process he became the 225th player to represent New Zealand. He also played 5 matches for Auckland from 1932 to 1935 along with four matches for Auckland (Tāmaki) Māori from 1936 to 1939, and a match for Taranaki XIII in 1936. He played rugby league for the Newton Rangers club in Auckland from 1930 to 1940 and for the Manukau Rovers rugby club from 1928 to 1930. In 1940 he enlisted in the Second World War effort and fought in the Mediterranean. His younger brothers Wilfred Brimble and Walter Brimble also played rugby league for New Zealand.

== Early life ==
Brimble was born on 28 June 1910, in Molteno, Eastern Cape, South Africa. His father was Englishman Harold Pierrepont Brimble and his mother was (Jane) Depua Mahadna. She was Bantu and worked as a nurse. Harold was originally working as a railways electrician from Bristol and had moved to South Africa as a 17 year old with friends looking for work. While there he enlisted in the British Army and was badly wounded in the Boer War. Jane was his nurse and she nursed him back to health. They were married soon after and had five sons while living in South Africa before leaving apartheid South Africa on 9 March 1912. Their sons and ages when they departed South Africa were John (6), Cyril (4), Ted (2), and twins Walter and Lionel (4 months old). They originally moved to Australia, but their whites settlement law caused them to move again. They travelled to Sydney before boarding the Makura for Hawaii on 6 May 1912. While living in Honolulu for 2 years they had another son, Wilfred Brimble on 16 November 1913. Both Walter and Wilfred would also go on to represent New Zealand at rugby league.

On 21 April 1915, the family departed Honolulu, Hawaii destined for Auckland on board the S.S Niagara. The family travelled in steerage with Harold occupation stated as a salesman, John and Cyril were "students" and Jane a "housewife". The whole family was listed, with ages in brackets as Harold P. (34), John (9), Cyril (7), Edward (Ted) (5 and a half), Lionel (3), Walter (3), Jane (30), and Wilfred (1). They were all listed as being English as nationality aside from Jane who was listed as "African" and Wilfred whose nationality was American as he had been born in Hawaii. After arriving in Auckland the family settled in Onehunga, a modern-day suburb in central Auckland though at that time was considered more on the southern boundary of urban Auckland. While there a seventh son, Amyas, was born on 4 April 1917. Amyas and Harold both died in the Spanish Flu Epidemic. Harold died on 21 November 1917, aged 37, while Amyas died on 17 May 1920, aged 3.

== Playing career ==
Brimble grew up in the Onehunga area where the Manukau Rugby club was located at that time before it later moved to Māngere. They played most of their matches at present day Waikaraka Park.

His older brothers John Pierrepont Mhlabani Brimble and Cyril Brimble were both accomplished rugby and rugby league players themselves and Ted was to follow them into the Manukau Rovers rugby club.

The very first mention of Brimble in the Auckland newspapers of the time was on July 9, 1923. He kicked a penalty goal for the Manukau Cruising Club's sole rugby league team which was playing in the 6th grade B section. Also in the side was Roy Hardgrave who scored 2 tries in the same game, which they won 18-0 over Richmond Rovers. Neither of them were full members of the side and were actually playing for the Manukau club but were on a bye and were most likely 'ringins'. The team ceased to play later in the season. Then on 28 January 1924 he placed third in the 50 Yard Juvenile race at the Basin Reserve in Onehunga at a celebration to mark the one year anniversary of the Manukau Cruising Club. He finished behind Roy Hardgrave who won and would also represent New Zealand at rugby league in the 1920s.

In late July, Brimble was chosen to attend Eden Park along with 39 other boys on 1 August in order to help the selectors chose an Auckland Primary Schools representative side.

=== Rugby career ===
==== Manukau Rovers rugby ====
In 1925 older brother John was playing for the Manukau Rovers rugby club senior side, with a Brimble listed in the 4th grade team and another in the 5th grade side, most likely Cyril and Ted respectively due to their age difference. That same year John was selected for the Auckland B representative team to play North Waikato in July.

In 1927 Ted won a medal for the most improved third grade player award at the club's annual ball at the Orpheum Hall in Onehunga. The senior award went to Cliff Satherley who would later switch to rugby league as well and also play for New Zealand. Walter Brimble won the same award for the seventh grade side. Then in 1928 he was still playing for their 3rd grade side, along with his brother Cyril. John was still in the senior side, with Walter progressing to the 6th grade with other brothers Wilfred and Lionel in the 7th grade A and 7th grade B teams. John was chosen for the Auckland A side to play Bay of Plenty making him the first of all the brothers to play a full senior representative match, with five of them eventually achieving the same feat.

Ted made his first appearance for the Manukau senior side, which played in the B grade, in a match against Tramways on 18 August. They won a “sparkling game of rugby” by 22 points to 0 on their home ground. Their selection was last minute with only six senior players present they filled the remainder of the positions with their 3rd grade intermediate side which Cyril and Ted were part of. The Auckland team was playing the same day which most likely accounted for some of the absences, notably older brother John who was away in the side. The Auckland Star remarked that Cyril “at centre, played a good game, being ably supported by his brother, “Arab” Brimble, who delighted the crowd with his solo play”. “Arab” must have been an early nickname for Ted (who was more known as Teddy or Ted), perhaps on account of his skin colour.

In 1929 Ted had become a regular in the senior side which was now in the top division, making his first appearance at five eighth in their opening round match against City on 27 April. They won the match 30 to 9 at Onehunga with Brimble kicking a drop goal and John scoring a try. Karl Ifwersen, the former All Black and New Zealand rugby league international was playing for City, now aged 36. Brimble's drop goal came after A. Bryers passed to him and he “side stepped for position, and potted a neat goal”. The following week Manukau beat Marist 8–6 with Brimble dropping another goal midway through the second half to give Manukau the win after they had trailed 6–5. The Sun newspaper said “viewed broadly, it was [Cliff] Satherley's game in the first spell, and T. Brimble's in the second. Brimble was actually Manukau's handiest back. Only 18, he is a five eighth with a wealth of promise”.

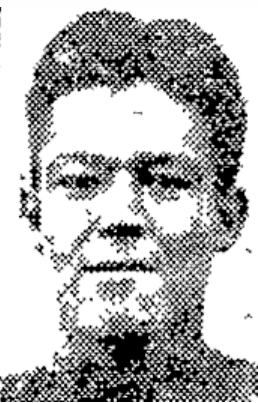
Ted around 1929. The photo was published in the Auckland Star after their 4 May win where he starred.

The Auckland Star commented that “the hero of the match, T. Brimble, first five eight, gave a dashing display for his size, being brilliant on defence and tricky on attack. He fumbled his passes on a few occasions, but made up for this, with a great field goal from an almost impossible position with Marist players all round him. He is very light (9 and a half stone), but is not afraid to go down on the ball in front of a pack of big forwards”. The following week they played at Eden Park against Ponsonby and lost 29–17. The Sun said “Bryers, Manukau's hard-working and enterprising little half, and the nimble Brimble, were effective inside backs, and [Bill] Turei and Linden were both honest workers”. The Star said Brimble “showed up in the early stages for strong running, but later he was regularly pocketed, and his failure to send the ball along smartly often lost chances”.

They played Training College again at Eden Park on 18 May and lost 25 to 11. Ted scored two tries in the loss. At one point he was involved in a Manukau attack “which went from one twenty-five to the other. [Alby] Falwasser, Linden and the Brimble brothers scattered the defence, and Linden was almost over”. His first try came after he supported Falwasser who was tackled two yards from the line and he picked up the ball to score. His second came when he received the ball from a scrum near the line and cut in to score near the posts. He scored again the next week against University in a 9–6 loss at Eden Park, touching down “for a fine try … after some bright passing”. Older brother John scored their other try. In a match with College Rifles a week later at Onehunga which they won it was said that he and Falwasser “were too well watched to be seen to advantage”. They had another win over Technical Old Boys at Onehunga a week later and the Star reported that “Brimble was up to his usual standard as a sound defensive player, being the only Manukau back to tackle his man low”. Then in their next match on 8 June at Onehunga they drew 10–10 with Grammar Old Boys. He gave Manukau the lead in the final quarter after “cutting in and giving Turei a clear run in”. The following week saw John sent off for talking back to the referee in a 6 July loss to Marist and a suspension for a week. There was relatively little mention of Ted over the remainder of the season as Manukau began their Pollard Cup games though the Sun did say that he stood out along with Albon and Satherley in a 22–3 win over North Shore on 3 August. At the club's end of season prize giving it was noted that John had achieved Auckland representative honours while Wilfred and Lionel had been members of the champion sixth grade side.

The 1930 season was to be Ted's last playing rugby union. He began the year playing for Manukau once more but was to only play 6 matches for them from May until early June. On 3 May he went off with an injured ankle in the second half after having been “conspicuous” in the game prior. Earlier in the match he had been involved in attacking play with Jones and after he “carried the ball to Marist's line … he fell heavily against the post”. He had recovered in time to play the next week against City at Onehunga in an 18–0 win. He was “prominent in good runs” along with Thomas. Two weeks later in a loss to Ponsonby at Eden Park the Star remarked that Brimble “was one of the weak links in the Manukau line, and the black rearguard were never really dangerous as a scoring machine”. The next week against Technical Old Boys he “got through a good deal of work” in a 9–6 loss. In his last ever game for Manukau he scored a try in a 17 to 8 win over Grafton.

=== Rugby league ===
==== 1930 switch to Newton Rangers rugby league ====
In mid June Brimble switched codes to rugby league and joined the Newton Rangers side in the Auckland Rugby League senior grade. Newton was a central Auckland suburb slightly to the West of Queen Street stretching from Karangahape Road and upper Symonds Street. It was cut in half by the building of the Central Motorway Junction in 1965–75. His older brother Cyril had been playing for Newton for a year and a half and it was likely this connection that brought him across. His first ever match was against Marist Old Boys on 21 June at Carlaw Park. He played in the five eighths position along with Murray, while Cyril played in the centres. Ted was involved in some early defensive work and then later in the match secured the ball and “paved the way for Ed St George to score under the posts” with Cyril converting. The Sun wrote on 25 June “a notable absentee from Manukau's ranks on Saturday was “Teddy” Brimble, the five eighth, who has forsaken rugby for league. Brimble has joined the Newton league team, and his absence was particularly noticeable on Saturday when Jones had to fill the vacancy. He did not show the same dash in a position to which he is unaccustomed...”. The Auckland Star wrote that Ted, “the nippy Manukau rugby five eighths, made his first appearance in the thirteen-a-side game, and created quite a good impression, for his alertness to dart into openings and speed on the move. He combined well with his brother, C. Brimble, who filled the role of centre with distinction”.

The following week he scored his first points in rugby league with a try in a 22–18 win over Ellerslie at Carlaw Park. His try came in the second half after he supported McLeod and Hill who had broken through. He had earlier missed two conversion attempts and Cyril then failed to convert his try. Claude Dempsey then took over the goal kicking for their remaining tries. The Sun said that Ted, Newton's “latest recruit, is making a difference to the back”. He played in a 5–0 loss to Devonport United and then in a 21–8 loss to City Rovers he scored his second try. It came early in the match to give them the lead when he scored following loose play after New Zealand international Claude Dempsey had kicked ahead, with Cyril missing the conversion. Newton then lost to Kingsland Athletic on 19 July at the Auckland Domain 13 to 5. Ted converted their only try to Ray Middleton who had taken a pass from Ed St George after he beat Claude List. The Auckland Star said “the Brimble brothers played their usual good game…”. They lost again, to Ponsonby by 18 to 7 though Ted performed well. At one point he “flashed away, but with only Wilson to beat lost possession” and in general “did great work on defence”. The New Zealand Herald said that he was the best of the five eighths. Newton then broke their run of losses with an 11–3 win over Richmond Rovers on the Auckland Domain. The Star reported that “the Brimble brothers gave a brilliant display”. They then drew with Marist on Carlaw Park #2 field in the final round of the 1st grade competition 16–16. The Sun wrote that “Ted Brimble was the star of the red and white constellation, and in fact there can hardly have been a better back than he on the field on Saturday. He is a wonderful opportunist, and on many occasions Marists was left lamenting when he intercepted lob passes. He has pace above the ordinary and was thus able to come to the rescue of his side frequently”. The result meant that they finished tied for 5th in the 8 team competition for the 1930 Monteith Shield. There was some confusion in the newspapers with the Herald saying that Cyril scored 2 tries but the Star saying that Ted had scored 1 after he “made a brilliant run from midfield and centred. McLeod missed the ball, but the kicker ran on to retrieve and score wide out”. The Herald in contrast said that he had intercepted a pass and kicked hard down field with McLeod unable to touch down Cyril came through to score. They went on to say that the weakness of Newton in their backs was Cammick and “the result was that much of the responsibility fell on the first five eighths, E. [Ted] Brimble, who played brilliantly and proved himself the big thorn to the greens. He is fast and thrustful”. The Herald in another edition said Brimble “played a brilliant game. His pace paved the way for two of Newton's tries. Brimble is now back to his best form”. Newton's first try came after Ted “made a beautiful opening and passed to C. Brimble, who scored a fine try between the posts”. His last game for Newton in his debut season for them was in their 15–2 loss to Devonport United in the first round of the Roope Rooster knockout competition. Ted played well with the Star saying that he was able to “smash attacks with judgment and to initiate counter-moves which invariably spelt danger”. They also mentioned his lack of support in the backs, writing that they lacked “assertive wingers to follow through the efforts of E. Brimble and the previous two mentioned” [Hill and Dempsey].

Ted wasn't finished for the season however as he had begun playing in the Wednesday league which was made up of 6 teams. He played for the New Zealand Fertilisers company side which he was presumably working for as a labourer (which his electoral roll occupation status indicated). On 3 September against Chess Taxis they won 5–0. He and Butterworth “were prominent inside backs for the “Works”, who pressed hard early in the game”. They then beat Trotting Trainers on 10 September at Carlaw Park by 9 points to 0. He, Muir, and Butterworth “played fine football for the winners, who profited by the mistakes of their opponents”. In total they played 5 matches and finished second behind the Barmen side.

On 25 September it was reported that Cyril had had his transfer to Canterbury Rugby League approved. He had moved to Christchurch and initially at the start of the season began playing in their senior rugby competition for Merivale. He played the season with them and then in 1932 transferred back to rugby league, joining the Addington club. He would go on to represent the Canterbury side and then after moving to Wellington later in the decade represented Wellington also.

==== 1931 Newton ====
In early April, Brimble competed in the Ōtorohanga Sports Club's athletic meeting on Easter Monday. He ran in the 100 yard, 120 yard, and 220 yard races. For Newton in club rugby league he played 15 games and scored 5 tries through the 1931 season. The first grade competition was now competing for the Fox Memorial Shield for the first time which is still competed for to this day. Newton came 5th of the 7 sides with a 2 win, 2 draw, 8 loss record. They struggled on attack, scoring just 83 points in their 12 matches which was the least of all sides. In their opening match against the combined Ellerslie-Ōtāhuhu side at the Ellerslie Reserve they drew 5–5. The following week they were thrashed by Devonport 26–0 at Carlaw Park. The Auckland Star was scathing in its criticism of Brimble saying that Hill “was badly let down by the five-eighths, Brimble never giving a worse exhibition. It was appalling the way he fumbled and dropped passed. His surprising mistakes threw the backs out of gear”. They lost further matches to Richmond 6–3, and Ponsonby 20–8 before a three try performance from Brimble in another loss, this time to Marist 18–9 on the number 2 field at Carlaw Park. The Star was that his three tries were “well deserved”. Newton were playing with a young side in the 1931 season. His first try came after Francis passed to him and he scored near the corner. His second came in the second half after Marist had been on attack but “Brimble changed the situation by outpacing the opposition to score”, then his third was scored late in the match after taking a pass from Beattie. The Newton season took a slight improvement with a 0–0 draw over City Rovers and then a 14–3 win over the Ellerslie-Ōtāhuhu side at the Auckland Domain. They lost to Devonport 20–5 and then Marist 17–9 on rounds 9 and 10 respectively. Both sides would finish champions and runners up. Brimble scored a try in the loss to Marist. He had missed a conversion in the first half but secured 3 points with a try following some attacking back play. It was said that he was “sound on both defence and attack” along with Ray Middleton, Ed St George, and A. Pope. In a 12–7 loss to Ponsonby at Stafford Park in Northcote on Auckland's North Shore he played his “usual sure game for Newton”. The following week they lost to Richmond 8–0 at Carlaw Park with Brimble said to be “the pick of the backs” along with Hill. Their final regular season match of the year saw Newton secure a rare win, 23–10 over City Rovers. City were weakened with 5 regular players absent but Newton beat them easily enough with Brimble “prominent” in their performance. Newton played against Hamilton twice, on August 9 and August 22. The first match was at Hinemoa Park in Hamilton and saw Newton win 28–6 with Brimble scoring a try. Their season ended 3 weeks later when they were thrashed by Devonport in the first round of the Roope Rooster knockout competition.

==== 1932 New Zealand selection v England ====
The 1932 season was a remarkable one for Ted Brimble, gaining selection for New Zealand to play a test match against the touring England. He had had an impressive season for Newton, scoring 6 tries in 10 matches for them. They finished last of the 6 sides but had been competitive in almost all their matches with their biggest loss by only 7 points with several just 1 or 2 points.

In Newton's opening round match against City on 30 April, Brimble scored a try in an 18–5 win at the Auckland Domain. The 2 rounds later he scored a try in an 8–8 draw against Devonport at Carlaw Park. He was said to be “as usual, always a thorn in the side of the opposition”. His try came after Allen St George “initiated a clever movement and sent Brimble over for a try under the posts” which Claude Dempsey converted. He was involved in several other attacking movements in the second half but they were unable to score the winning try. Then in a 15–13 win over Richmond he “gave a mercurial and incisive display, and with good support right through, the Newton backs worked like a machine”. The Herald wrote that “brilliant play by Brimble was a feature of the game between Newton and Richmond. His keen anticipation, sure handling and crisp passing delighted the spectators, while he used his speed with great effect. The five-eighths inspired several fine movements among the backs, and paved the way for Newton's victory. Such a brilliant display of back play has not been witnessed on the number two ground this season”. He was involved in an attacking movement which led to an early Newton penalty goal, then he secured the ball and outran the opposition to score. At the start of the second half he “made a sparkling run and sent a long pass to [Ray] Middleton who scrambled over wide out”. Then a while later he punted high, chased and put pressure on Richmond enabling Arnold Porteous to score from the “ensuing melee”. In a 13–10 loss to Marist on 4 June he was said to have been “the best of their inside backs, taking all sorts of passes and handling the ball on unselfishly”. He scored another try in the match with the Herald saying “Brimble, first five-eighths, played a fine all-round game, his try being a clever effort. A tendency to run across the field was his only fault”. Then a week later in a 13–13 draw with City, Brimble “maintained his form of the previous Saturday, and his incisive dash and sharp penetration on attack made the Newton back line a force to be reckoned with”. Against Ponsonby in round 7, in a 7–5 loss he “made a brilliant run through the Ponsonby team and was only stopped ten yards from the line” with Charles Allen scoring shortly afterwards. A minute later he beat Frank Delgrosso but Ponsonby narrowly escaped. Newton then lost 18–17 to Devonport who were the competition leaders and on the verge of sealing the 1932 championship. Brimble “showed head work and resource to make countless openings in attack, and R. Pope teamed in well beside him”. Brimble added to his try tally for the season scoring his fifth. In round 9 Newton lost to Richmond 13–6. The match was notable for the debut in rugby league of Bert Cooke, the famous All Black rugby union player. Brimble opened the scoring for Newton after crossing for a try from a “scramble”, giving them a 3–2 lead. The Herald wrote that Pope and Brimble “were associated in some clever passing which delighted the spectators”. Newton's final match in the Fox Memorial competition did not come until 13 August. It had been scheduled for 9 July but due to heavy rain it was postponed. With the England team touring and the need for an Auckland side to be selected to play against them the final round was delayed several weekends.

On 16 July an Auckland XIII side played South Auckland (Waikato) at Carlaw Park. On the same day a trial match was played between Possible and Probable sides with Brimble being selected for the Possibles team. He was chosen in the five eighths alongside O’Donnell of Devonport with Wilf Hassan inside them at halfback. He was opposed by current and future New Zealand internationals Stan Prentice and Dick Smith. Bert Cooke had been chosen ahead of Brimble for the Auckland side with the Auckland Star writing “it is open to question whether Cooke (Richmond) should have been given preference over Brimble (Newton)… Brimble is remarkably speedy off the mark, having developed into a class player this season”. Brimble's side lost 26–12. He was involved in a try to Hobbs after making a “nice run before passing” to the try scorer. He later made another “nice run” but held on instead of passing to Allan Seagar who “could have scored”.

Brimble missed North Island selection to play in the inter-island match with Thomas McClymont . The Herald wrote “the inclusion of Prentice will come as a surprise to followers of the code, as the Richmond five-eighths has not shown good club form this season. He was overshadowed on Saturday by Brimble in the trial match”. Ted was however selected for the Possibles in another trial match which was played on 23 July as curtain-raiser to the inter-island match at Carlaw Park. He was playing in the five eighths positions alongside Harry Johns of Richmond. Johns would die tragically 10 weeks later on 4 October after having been knocked out the night before in a boxing match at the Auckland Town Hall. Opposite the pair were O’Donnell and Smith. Before a crowd of 15,000 the Possibles side won a high scoring game by 37 to 16 with Brimble scoring one of their seven tries. It came after he outpaced Claude Dempsey “to score a nice try”. Newton then completed their delayed match against Marist which was lost 10–6 at Ellerslie Reserve on 13 August. Newton ended up finishing equal last of the 6 sides with Richmond despite their for and against record being 104–108 which showed how competitive they had been. The Star said “Brimble was the best back on the ground. His proclivity for finding gaps, his elusiveness and speed, were a pleasure, whilst his defence was notable”.

===== New Zealand 1932 selection =====
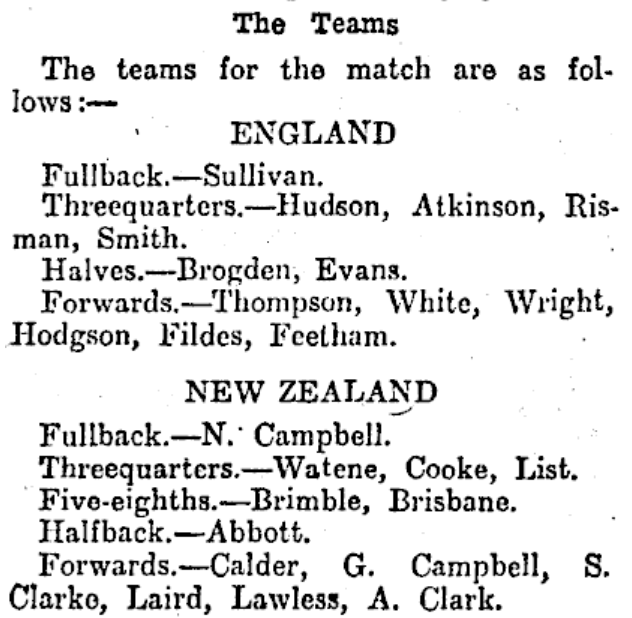

The touring England had won the first two test matches with New Zealand by 19 to 14 on 6 August and 25–14 on 13 August. Brimble was then chosen for New Zealand to play in the third test at Carlaw Park. The Auckland Star wrote “the inclusion of Brimble in the first berth will be hailed with satisfaction. There are many good judges who consider that the clever little Newtonian has been mistakenly overlooked for big games. He should link up well with the scrum half, Abbott”. He was at five eighth alongside veteran Hec Brisbane with Abbott at halfback. Opposite them were Stan Brogden and Bryn Evans for England. Brimble was replacing Wilf Hassan and The Herald said “a promising young player, Brimble has shown good form throughout the season in club football”. The match was played before a crowd of around 13,000 at Carlaw Park and saw England win 20–18 with a last minute try. New Zealand kicked a penalty after 2 minutes to take a 2–0 lead, then less than 2 minutes later “from play in England's twenty-five, Brimble secured and sent to Cooke, who made a fine opening before giving Brisbane a clear run in”. With New Zealand leading 5–0 “Brisbane, List, Brimble and Campbell … featured in some great tackling”. Later in the half with the score tied 8–8 Cooke had mishandled the ball but “instead of being given the benefit of the advantage rule, New Zealand, for whom Brimble had touched down near the posts, were brought back for a scrum”. At one point in the first half Brimble nearly let in a try after being fooled by a dummy from Bryn Evans but England failed to score. Then with England leading 12–8 “the crowd cheered themselves hoarse when a long kick by Brisbane bounced awkwardly for Sullivan. Cooke, Brimble and Watene were following up and Cooke gathered the ball and had a clear run in”.

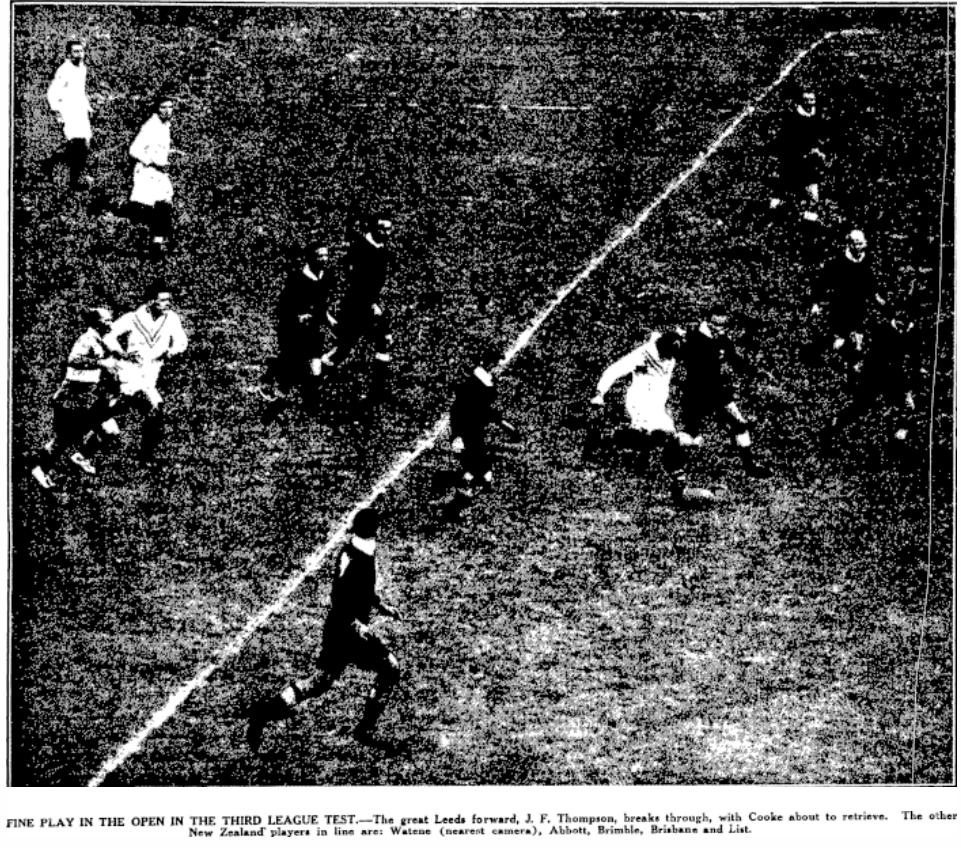

Late in the match with New Zealand leading 18–17 “Brimble made a mistake in attempting to beat Stan Brogden instead of passing” after attempting to cut through from a scrum in the English half. As a result, Gus Risman flashed in, secured the ball “and started a passing bout”, the Auckland Star said that Brogden knocked the ball on but it was missed by the referee and after the ball reached Artie Atkinson he cut through, drawing and passing to Barney Hudson who scored the match winning try in the corner.

Following the test Brimble was selected for Auckland to play South Auckland (Waikato) in Huntly on 2 October alongside George Mills of Ponsonby in the five eighths positions with Kenneth Peckham and Edwin Abbott opposite them in the South Auckland side. Auckland won the match 35–8 before 700 spectators to win the Sunshine Cup charity match. His final game of the season came for an Auckland XIII against Marist Old Boys as a charity match to raise money for Trevor Hanlon to assist him and his family to return from England where he had been playing but had fallen on hard times. The Marist side won 27–16. Brimble played well combining “cleverly” with Crook. Brimble and Prentice “were a lively pair at five eighths”. Around the same time the Manukau rugby league club had reformed at Onehunga with Ted's younger brother Lionel on the committee. Ted's other younger brother Walter would go on to represent their senior side later in the decade and gain New Zealand selection from there.

==== 1933 Newton and Auckland ====
Brimble once again turned out for Newton in a similar back-line to the previous year. In their opening game he scored a try in a 25–11 win over Richmond at Carlaw Park. He “linked up in dashing style with [Arnold] Porteous, who was in great fettle”. The Herald wrote that “Porteous, Brimble and [Laurie] Barchard were the outstanding backs. Brimble was particularly good, making frequent openings which led to tries”. Brimble then starred in a 16–12 win over City.

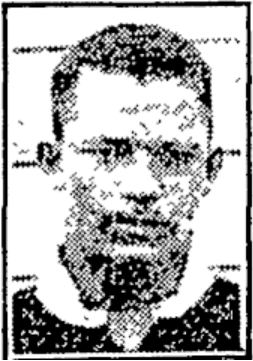
Photograph in the Auckland Star on 8 May after his magnificent performance.

The Auckland Star said “Brimble, the Newton five-eighths covered himself with glory. This young back was the outstanding player on the park on the day. He ran, handled and defended with real brilliance and has obviously profited by his brief international experience last season. His speed off the mark and guile made him a perfect pivot for the four three-quarter line…”. The Herald said he “was the outstanding back for Newton. He was in every movement and always dangerous on attack”. Ted scored again in their third victory, on 13 May against Devonport by 11 points to 8. He impressed the journalists once more with the Star writer saying “Brimble again shone. His play in the last stages was a revelation, and the winning try seemed but a just reward”. The Herald said they had “more thrust” in their back movements and better passing and “this in a large measure can be accounted for by Brimble's quickness off the mark which gave his outside men a chance to get on the move”. He, “after settling down, was in fine form, and his try was a brilliant solo effort in which he beat several defenders”. Newton suffered their first loss in round 4 to Marist by 11 points to 6. Marist moved Hec Brisbane to five eighth and he “bottled up Brimble effectively”, despite this he was still “the best back”. He saved a try in the first half from a kick ahead and then towards the end he scored “after a melee near the posts” though his conversion attempt hit the crossbar. Newton lost to Ponsonby 28–17 and then Richmond 18–10. Ted was “unable to make his usual piercing runs, but his defence and anticipation were superb”.

Brimble's form had been good enough to gain selection for Auckland for their match again Taranaki who were playing in Auckland for the first time in 19 years. He was paired with Dick Smith in the five eighths positions with Wilf Hassan captaining the side at halfback. J. Arnold and F. McLaggan were the Taranaki five eighths. Auckland won 32–20 at Carlaw Park before 10,000 spectators. The Star wrote that “Brimble and Smith were both snappy, particularly Brimble, who was always in attacking movements”. The Herald said Brimble was “disappointing at first five-eighths and repeatedly dropped his passes” after being bustled by the Taranaki forwards.

He returned to the Newton side on 17 June to play City. They were thrashed 35–13 with Brimble injured during the match. His injury came early in the second half when he collided with his teammate Cameron. Cameron left the field meaning they had to play with twelve men, while “Brimble was palpably lame”. In the first half he had stood out but “was only a passenger over the concluding stages owing to a severe kick on the knee”. He had scored a first half try after he “made a beautiful opening and easily beat the City backs to score a fine try”. Both Brimble and Cameron missed Newton's next match which was a loss to Devonport. He returned the following week in a 24–8 loss to Marist in which he and Arnold Porteous “impressed”. It was reported after the game however that Brimble “is not showing the form of last season”. He got the better of Hec Brisbane early in the match after gathering the ball and beating him before passing to Pope who scored. Newton then beat Ponsonby 27–15 to finish the Fox Memorial competition in 4th place of the 6 sides and he was said to be in “good form” along with Porteous, scoring a try and kicking a rare conversion.

Ted was then selected for a trial match to play a curtain raiser to Auckland v South Auckland on 15 July for the B Team. They lost the match 16–9 though there was no mention of him in any match reports and the teams seemed jumbled from how they were initially listed. Following a match for Newton against Richmond on 29 July he was selected in the Auckland squad to travel to New Plymouth in Taranaki to play the local side. The match was not well covered and he was not mentioned in any of the match reports with Auckland winning 25–17 before a crowd of 2,000 at Western Park in New Plymouth.

After returning to Auckland, Brimble played 5 more matches for Newton in a Challenge Round competition which involved all teams playing each other once more. Newton won the competition winning all 5 of their matches. He was “prominent” in their first win over Marist by 13 points to 11. The Herald said in their 14–5 win over Devonport the following week that he had shown “improved form”. He was possibly injured around this time as there was no further mention of him in the season and he did not play in Newton's match with the touring St. George side from New South Wales on 11 October. He had been named to play in all 3 challenge cup matches but with his position being a prominent one it is possible he was absent.

==== 1934 broken collarbone and comeback ====
In Newton's 1934 opening game on 28 April Brimble was described as “erratic at times” with his five eighth partner, Roy Bright. They were both “weak in handling” in the 18–7 loss to Richmond. The following week they beat City 32–3. Brimble “who has years of play ahead of him, was really brilliant and undoubtedly he is striking the form which distinguished his promise of three years ago”. On 12 May the new grandstand was opened at Carlaw Park with 17,000 in attendance. Newton beat Devonport in the early game by 18 points to 8 with Brimble and halfback Arnold Porteous doing “useful work on attack”. Against Ponsonby, Newton lost 8–5 with Porteous going off injured with “neither Brimble nor Crook” able to “satisfactorily fill the gap”. Though he along with Crook and Pope “were alert and clever” and his try was “a good effort”. Ted scored again in a 22–13 win over Marist. He was said to be “magnificent at five-eighth”. Claude Dempsey played an outstanding game at full back with Brimble “the best of the other backs”. Newton lost a match that was described as “the most varied and stirring club match seen for many a day” to Richmond by 3 points to 2. Brimble was “always in the picture” and was “now in top form”. During the first half McNeil and Ted Mincham both left the field for Richmond with injuries and then Ray Lawless for Richmond and Reuban Kelsall for Newton were both ordered off for fighting. Mortimer Stephens, who had played professionally for St Helens and Brimble were said to be the best of the Newton backs. Stephens son Owen Stephens went on the represent both New Zealand (1968) and Australia (1973–74) at rugby union and the Parramatta rugby league team in 1975 and 1977, along with Wakefield Trinity in 1975.

Brimble himself must have been injured late in the game because an advertisement in the Auckland Star in late July said that he had received £10 from an insurance scheme for breaking his collarbone playing rugby league. He missed Newton's matches against City, Devonport, and Ponsonby, before returning to play against Marist on 7 July. Newton won 9 to 8 with New Zealand international Roy Hardgrave playing on the wing for Newton. Hardgrave had just returned from playing for St Helens for 5 seasons, rejoining the Newton club with which he had played for from 1924 to 1929. Brimble “was at his top form, revealing that the rest following his recent injury has done him good. His brilliant and elusive running and fine supporting play was only curbed when the Marist hooker Steven began to get ball from the scrums”. In an 11–7 win over Richmond he played “a good all-round game” but apparently kicked too much as did his opposite, Stan Prentice. Newton then beat City 17–5 and “Brimble again revealed exhilarating brilliance, and his pace, thrustfulness and well timed passes meant much to the nimble Schlesinger”, a recent recruit from the Point Chevalier club. He was “in his best form at first five-eighths, and did a great deal of clever work both on attack and defence”. The Herald wrote that “he frequently made gaps in the defence on Saturday by nippy and penetrating runs. He quickly seized his chance when he slipped over for a nice try”. He missed their next match with Devonport after suffering from influenza.

Ted recovered in time to be selected for Auckland to play against Northland at Carlaw Park on 11 August. He was playing alongside Brian Riley from Ponsonby with Vincent Axmann of the City club at halfback. Auckland won the match 19–12. Brimble was involved in Riley's opening try after they had found themselves down on the scoreboard. The Auckland Star said “Brimble did some clever things, but was not assisted much by the extremely low and wide passes handed out from the scrum base by Axmann”. The Herald commented that Arthur Kay and Brimble “justified the confidence of the selectors”, with Brimble having a “busy day watching [Ted] Meyer” the Northland five eighth, who had previously represented New Zealand, who played brilliantly.

Brimble then finished the season playing several games for Newton. They were knocked out of the Roope Rooster in the first round by City on 18 August 14 points to 9. He was “prominent for good play” along with Brady. This placed Newton in the Phelan Shield competition which was being played for the first ever time in this 1934. It was essentially a consolation knockout competition. Newton went on to win it in its inaugural season. They beat Mount Albert 7–3, Devonport 11–8, and Ponsonby in the final on 8 September by 18 points to 10. In the final he, along with Cameron were “the star pair” and he crossed for one of their four tries. The win meant that Newton had qualified to play in the Stormont Shield (champion of champions) final against Richmond who had won both the championship and the Roope Rooster competition.

Brimble was chosen in the reserves to play for Auckland against South Auckland on 15 September but was not required to play. Then in September–October the New South Wales champions, Western Suburbs club from Sydney travelled to Auckland to play 5 club matches. The second of these was against Newton on 26 September at Carlaw Park. The match was drawn 10–10. Brimble played well with Cameron, and the pair “harassed their opponents by their pace off the mark” though “their collaborative work on attack… was less impressive”. Newton played their last match of the season in the Stormont Shield final on 13 October. Richmond won easily by 21 points to 5 with Brimble scoring Newton's only try. The try came after Trevor Hall “made a wonderful run to the corner, and from the ensuing scrummage, Brimble barged over in a tackle”. The conversion narrowed the score to 10–5 in Richmond's favour. Richmond however went on to win comfortably. The Auckland Star said that “Brimble and Cameron were a nippy five-eighths pair. Brimble played his best club game to date, but marred some efforts by poor handling”.

==== Brother joins Brimble at Newton and Auckland southern tour ====
At the conclusion of the 1934 season it was reported that Wilfred Brimble had been granted a transfer from Manukau third intermediate to the Newton seniors. The Herald reported in late April that “the Brimble brothers have shown promising form” in the preseason. They were both named to play in Newton's first match against Richmond on 27 April with Wilfred at halfback. Newton lost 27–15 to the reigning champions with Wilfred said to have given “as clever display as seen on the park for many a day”. While Ted “did some clever things at first five eighth, but his defence was sometimes at fault”. It was also said that “the Brimble brothers were in fine form and repeatedly cut the defence to ribbons. [Wilfred] B.(Bunny) Brimble, the halfback, gave a splendid display. His clean passing and clever running were features of his play. [Ted] E. Brimble five-eighths, proved dangerous on attack”. The following week Newton had a bye with the addition of the Mount Albert United side in the senior grade making seven teams. Newton played a curtain-raiser against the Huntly club from the Waikato at Carlaw Park. Newton won 13–9 with Wilfred converting two tries. On 11 May in a 22–22 draw with Mount Albert, Ted scored a try and was “perhaps the best back”.

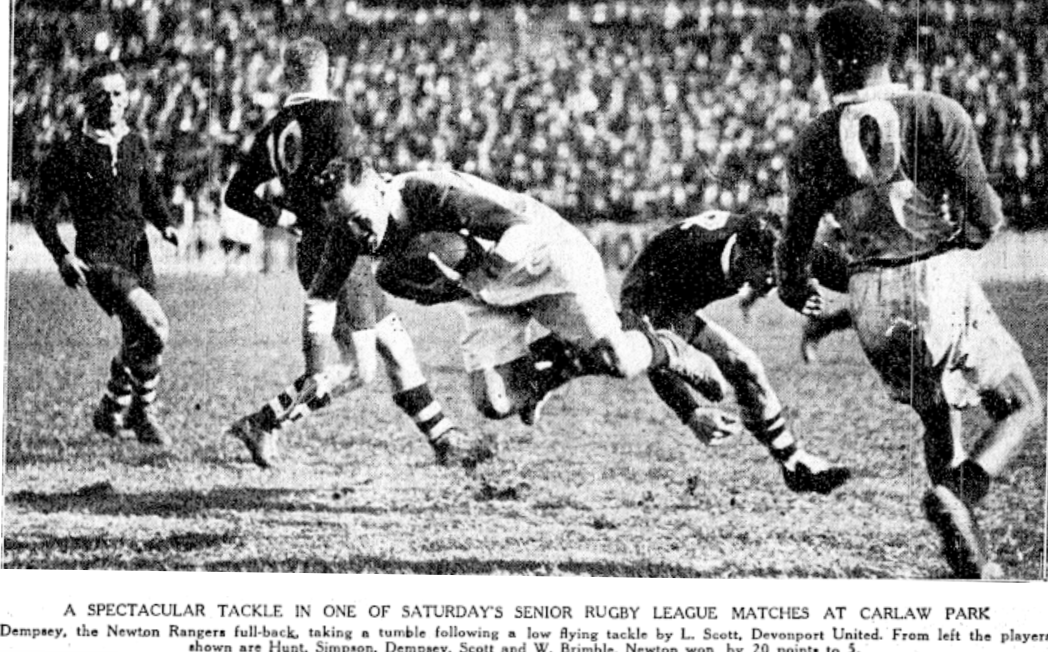
Wilfred in the '0' jersey with Claude Dempsey being tackled. The three of them were the mainstays of the Newton back line for much of the 1930s.

Newton outplayed Devonport in round 4, winning 20–5. Wilfred, “behind the Newton scrum, again revealed himself a brilliant half, … his partnership with [Ted] was good to watch, and the five eighth crowned his performance with a try full of merit”. His try came in the second half “when he cut in and left the opposition standing”. Ted scored another try on 1 June against Marist, while Wilfred scored himself and kicked 3 goals. The two of them “constituted the mainspring of attack”. Newton were said to have “owed a lot of its success to the combination of the brothers, Ted at first five-eighths also playing a fine game. The quickness off the mark and accurate handling and passing of the two brothers gave Marist a hard time, and the defence eventually crumpled badly”. During the week the Herald wrote that “the fine combination between him [Wilfred] and his brother [Ted], at first five eighths, was an outstanding feature of the game. Quick off the mark, with always an eye to an opening, the pair set an example which could well be followed by other inside backs in Auckland.

In round 7, Newton defeated City 15–5, with reports noting that “the try scored by Wilfred Brimble was the gem of the match. Six players handled the ball in a fast-length run, and when the defense challenged Ted, his younger brother raced in to complete a difficult pass. The crowd responded with prolonged applause.” Ted's good form continued in a 15–6 loss to Richmond in round 8 where he was “the most brilliant five-eighths out”. He was prominent again on attack against Mount Albert but Newton suffered a low scoring defeat, 3 points to 0. In round 12 on 13 July against Ponsonby, Newton won 14–13 with a try set up by Ted on full time. He gave Maurice Quirke the final pass for him to score and “played with resource throughout, being on hand when his side needed to be extricated from a tight corner, and always looking for the opening that would bring points. He was perhaps the best back on the ground”. He and Wilfred were “the outstanding players… [with Ted making] several nice openings, which gave the three quarters plenty of opportunities”. The match was the first ever played in Glen Eden, West Auckland at the Glen Eden Recreation round, home of the Glenora Bears rugby league club. Ted scored another try in a 10–7 loss to City but was said to have “spoilt a lot of fine work by selfishness”. The Herald however said that Ted was “easily the best back, and he made several brilliant openings at five-eighths. His try was a fine effort”. In their round 14 match they beat Marist 7–5 to finish 4th in the championship. He “worked well” with Claude Dempsey in the win, “handling the greasy ball in great style”.

Ted was then named in the Auckland B side to play South Auckland on 3 August at Carlaw Park. He however ultimately played in the Auckland A side which played Taranaki on the same day in the 3pm kick off. Auckland won the match 37 to 14 though it was said that Ted did not team up well in the five-eighths position with Arthur Kay. Kay played as an individual and scored three solo tries. Ted meanwhile played his “best football in the second half”. Ted was then picked in an Auckland A trial team to play on 17 August to help the selectors find the team to play the touring Australian side. Wilfred was selected in the Auckland B trial team. Ted was teamed with Eric Fletcher in the five eighths positions. Ted's A team won 22–19 with Wilfred scoring one of the B Team's tries.

The following week Ted played for Newton in their round 1 Roope Rooster win over Ōtāhuhu Rovers which they won 27–8. Ted “was the star of Newton, being brilliant in all stages of play” and he scored three of their tries to take his season tally to 7 meaning he finished tied for 7th place in the Auckland club try scoring list. The Herald said he “was easily the best Newton back, and he made some nice openings”.

Ted was then chosen in the Auckland side for their 3 match Southern Tour. This meant he missed Newton's Roope Rooster final against Richmond which Newton won 10–8. Both teams were below strength due to having players away for the tour. He played in the first tour match against Wellington on 7 September at Newtown Park in Wellington before a crowd of 3,000. Auckland won a high scoring game 39 to 27 with Brimble scoring one of Auckland's 9 tries. His try came early in the second half to give Auckland a 21–7 lead. The Evening Post said he “was a hard man to stop once in possession” and he and Kay “were responsible for many fine penetrative movements”. Ted played in the next match against West Coast in Greymouth on 11 September at Victoria Park. Auckland won easily by 32 points to 14 before 2,000 spectators. Brimble was involved in several attacking movement but well into the first half he injured his leg and had to go off. Claude Dempsey came on into a reshuffled back-line. Ted was named in the squad to play Canterbury in their next match but was omitted from the final side which had Brian Riley and Arthur Kay as the other five eighth options. During the first half both Jim Laird and Cliff Hall went off injured and Dan Keane and Brimble came on to replace them respectively. Brimble went to five eighth with Brian Riley moved to the wing. He was involved in three attacking movements soon after going on and after the ball flew along the back-line chain he sent Riley in for a try to make the score 23–5 after Cliff Satherley converted. Brimble was hurt again soon after but managed to return to play. Auckland finished the match with a 26–13 win at Monica Park in Christchurch before 3,000 spectators.

After Auckland returned from the tour they played a match against the touring Australian team and also an Auckland Province side played the tourists. Brimble was not selected for either match and was possibly still suffering from his injuries from the two tour matches.

==== Auckland Māori and Taranaki XIII selection ====
The 1936 season saw Ted play 13 matches for Newton. He also played for an Auckland Māori side despite not being of Māori heritage, and for the Taranaki side in a match against the touring England team as one of three Auckland backs brought in to strengthen the side along with Bill Glover and Thomas Trevarthan.

Prior to the start of the 1936 club season, which was beginning earlier than usual due to the touring of the England team later in the year a preview was written of the sides. Of Newton it was said that "Dempsey is doing well and the nippy combination of Young, the Brimble brothers, Frederick Sissons (a brilliant junior), H. Brady and Schlesinger will be in evidence again". Newton would struggle somewhat however and only win 2 of their 13 games, finishing last of seven. They opened with losses to Mount Albert and Marist before a 20–16 win over City Rovers on 16 May. Ted and Young found the Mount Albert defence difficult to break through in their opening round loss. However he played very well against Marist, being “the star of the match”. Newton had lost the match 11–0 but Ted was “outstanding on attack, and made several fine openings which went begging owing to lack of support”. His first try of the season was in their win over City. During the match “he showed up with speed and elusiveness in the Newton five-eighth line”. He “played a splendid game at five eighths and often cut the defence to ribbons. He ran straight once a gap was noticed and this gave the three-quarters room to work”. They then beat Devonport 23 to 5. Ted and Wilfred both attacked well in combination and “had a lot to do with Newton's success”. Ted “stood out prominently on attack and made several beautiful openings. His passing was always well timed and there was an entire absence of selfishness which on occasions has marred his play”. In a 19–14 loss to Richmond Ted and Wilfred “combined well, a feature being their accurate passing and handling. The former was always able to have speed on when accepting a transfer and he made some good openings from which tries should have been scored”. He played well again against Ponsonby along with his brother in a 22–10 loss.

Ted was then selected in the Auckland Māori side to play Auckland Pākēha on 23 June. Ted was not Māori but with a Bantu mother he was obviously considered 'non white' enough to qualify for that side. He had also grown up in the Onehunga area which was populated by many Māori from the Onehunga and nearby Māngere areas with many playing both rugby and rugby league for Manukau Rovers rugby, Manukau rugby league, and Māngere United rugby league in the area. His brother Wilfred was also selected in the squad but did not play. The Auckland Māori side, also named Tāmaki, won by 30 points to 21 at Carlaw Park. It was the first time the two sides had ever met. Brimble and Mahima at halfback were both “prominent in fine play”. When the score was 12–8 in their favour Steve Watene finished “off a brilliant opening by Brimble with a try by the posts”. Watene would later go on to become a prominent politician, entering New Zealand Parliament as a Labour Party member. His grandson is Dallin Watene-Zelezniak. Ted had missed two matches for Newton prior to the representative match but returned for their game against Marist on 27 June. They lost 14–12 but his reappearance in combination with Wilfred “gave their backs a touch of distinction”. They both “had splendid games”. They again paired well in a loss to City on 4 July, doing “a lot of good work, especially in the second half” when they “were effective on attack”.

Following a match with Richmond, Brimble was then selected to play for Taranaki in their match with England on 4 August at Pukekura Park in New Plymouth. Taranaki were a relatively weak side in the back line and so Brimble, fullback Bill Glover, and Thomas Trevarthan were brought into the side to strengthen it. The Taranaki side were well beaten 35 points to 4 but “Brimble gave a remarkable exhibition as first five-eighths” before a crowd of 3,000. Interestingly at the end of the England tour some of the English players “freely discussed the New Zealand part of the tour” and said that “Haslam was the best three quarter and Brimble the best five eighth” yet neither of them was selected in any of the tests.

He finished his season playing in Newton's final round match against Manukau on 29 August, and then a first round Roope Rooster loss to City by 17 points to 15. Ted kicked 1 conversion and 2 penalty goals. It was said that he and Wilfred “never let up”. In the same round their brother Walter switched codes and debuted for the Manukau rugby league senior side. Ted was associated with good play with Fredrick Sissons, and at full time the scores were tied 15–15 necessitating extra time needing to be played. Craddock Dufty a massive New Zealand rugby league personality of the era kicked a penalty in extra time to win the match for City. He missed Newton's final match of the season which was against Marist.

==== 1937 Newton and missed representative selection ====
The Auckland Star reported on 16 April that Ted was in hospital though they did not say the reason. He missed their 2 preseason games and their first 3 Fox Memorial matches before making his season debut in round 4 against City on 22 May. Newton lost 14–0, with he and Wilfred “prominent for some nice work on attack”. They lost again 14–9 to Richmond at Fowlds Park in Morningside, Mount Albert, though they were “well served by Wilfred and Ted” who “excelled on attack”. All the Brimble brothers played each other for the first time when Newton met Manukau on 5 June at Carlaw Park number 2 field. Manukau won the match 18–11. Ted and Wilfred made a “nice movement” with Young, and Frederick Sissons just missed a try. Walter's form had been good enough to gain selection for Auckland against South Auckland on 9 June. On 31 July in a round 12 match Newton had a rare win, beating North Shore 24–15. Ted scored 2 tries in the victory and “added finish to the attacking movements, and showed his dash of two seasons ago”. On 21 August in a round 13 match Newton beat City 34–19. New Zealand forward Bill McNeight had joined the Newton side. Ted and Hill “teamed well at five-eighths”. The Herald said “the rear division was well served by the Brimble brothers, who gave one of the best exhibitions seen at Carlaw Park this season. The pair were associated in almost every try, and their penetration was a thorn in the side of the opposition”. They “frequently cut the defence to ribbons with a variety of speedy attacks”. In their last round robin game they lost to Richmond 30–9 with Ted and Wilfred being “a lively pair of backs near the scrum”. Ted's last game of the season came in a Roope Rooster round 1 loss to Marist on 4 September. In late September Ted, Wilfred and Walter were all named in the New Zealand Māori squad to play against Auckland on 9 October at Carlaw Park. The match was listed as the Auckland Māori side but in reality was the same as the New Zealand Māori side which beat the touring Australia side earlier. Ultimately only Wilfred of the three brothers played in the match.

==== Newton's improvement and Auckland Māori appearances ====
In a preseason match with City on 2 April which Newton lost 20–16 the Brimble brothers “paired well in the inside backs”. The 1938 Fox Memorial competition started a week later. Newton improved significantly from their previous two years, winning 10 of their 16 matches to finish third. They lost their second match to Mount Albert, with Ted scoring a try. They “owed much to the Brimble brotherhood… [with] Ted linking well at first five eighth”. In a round 4 match, which Newton won 28–11 at Carlaw Park, Wilfred played brilliantly at half back and Ted “at five eighths, gave his brother excellent support, and his speed often cut out the City five-eighths”. The Auckland Star said that the pair “is showing the best combined play close to the scrum in Auckland”. Wilfred was in spectacular form and said to be the best halfback in Auckland. He was later selected for the New Zealand touring side to Australia along with their other younger brother Walter. In a 34–17 win over Papakura in round 5 Ted scored two tries. The Star said that “brilliant penetrative work by the two Brimbles was a big factor in the clear victory”. Ted “made many nice runs, and his two tries were splendid efforts”. Later in the week the Star wrote that “the real strength of Newton lies in their back play, and particularly the fine understanding that there is between Wilfred Brimble behind the scrum, and his brother, Ted at five eighth. Between them they show both sharpness and penetration, with the result that the men outside them get chances in attack which are up to now denied backs in some of the other teams”. In a 10–9 loss to Ponsonby on 14 May “the brothers E. and W. Brimble were a fine combination, and a clever connecting link with the scrum, the passing of E. Brimble being particularly neat and accurate”. Ted missed selection for the Auckland team to play the Rest of North Island team on 18 May. Both his brothers did however make the side. Walter was picked in the five-eighths position alongside Wally Tittleton. They both played well in a 67–14 thrashing of the Rest of North Island side and were then selected for the North Island side to play the South Island three days later on 21 May. The North Island team won 55–2 and unsurprisingly both of them were then selected for the New Zealand touring side.

Ted was selected for the Auckland Māori team to play the Auckland Pākēha side on 6 June. Before the match Ted played in a game for Newton against North Shore which they won 11–10. He played well and “was the best of the Newton backs and made several nice openings”. The Auckland Star suggested that on the performance of Ted in the Māori v Pākēha match that “his play was a feature of the game, and there are many good judges who considered that he should have had a place in the New Zealand team”. Auckland Māori won the match 26–21 though Ted was forced from the field late in the first half with an injury to his leg and was replaced by Mihaka Panapa.

Brimble then returned to the Newton side for a 6–2 loss to Marist and then a 5–2 loss to Manukau in round 10. Ted was said to be “outstanding, and made good openings on attack”. They lost again to Mount Albert the following week by 18 to 13. Brimble made “a fine opening and short punted for Taylor to race over” and “was the best of the Newton backs and made clever openings when an opportunity offered. In an easy 16–2 win over Richmond, Brimble scored a try. He was said to be “very nippy on attack, and left the defence standing when he cut through to open the score. He was more closely watched in the second half, but combined well with Fredrick Sissons and Hill in the inside positions”. The “good combination by Brimble and Sissons was a feature of the game. The pair sent out well-directed passes and used their speed once an opening presented itself. The honours of the game go to Brimble, whose first try, after an elusive run, gave the team more confidence and surprised the Richmond backs”. He scored another try in a 13–9 win over City at Carlaw Park. In the 12 July edition of the Auckland Star they published a portrait photograph of Ted and wrote a piece on his non selection in the Auckland team to play the returning New Zealand side which had played 9 matches in Australia. Wilfred had played in 6 of them and Walter in 7. The article said “one is tempted to wonder and regret the non-inclusion of E. Brimble in the Auckland backs, for his penetrative play this season has been on a very high plane. He got a try on Saturday that was the outcome of a remarkable double wide swerve. Had the selectors been standing where the writer was, right at the corner flag, as Brimble cut through, they would have appreciated the way that his opponents were caught on the wrong foot and baffled. Brimble has been paid the compliment of being chosen as a reserve”.

On 23 July Newton travelled to Christchurch to play the Canterbury team but Ted did not travel with the side which drew 16–16. Newton then beat Ponsonby 7–3 and Papakura 13–8 in round 16 at Ellerslie Reserve. Ted “was mainly responsible for winning the game. He showed a lot of speed and went through some very narrow openings”. In round 17 Newton defeated North Shore 13–10 to remain in the hunt for the first grade championship. In the first half Ted was involved in some attacking play with his brother and he put D. McKenzie over “for the best try of the game”. The “Brimble brothers were easily the best of the backs and were associated in some clever play round the scrum”. New Zealand international Jack Smith “found the Brimble brothers too fast once the pair settled down”. On 17 August Newton played Canterbury at Carlaw Park in a return match and won 22–12. Wilfred “played a splendid game at half back and received excellent support from E. Brimble, whose speed was most effective on attack”. Three days later Newton played their final round match against the leading side, Marist. If they had won there would have been a three-way tie for first necessitating some kind of playoff however Marist won 10–7 to claim the title by two points from Mount Albert in second and Newton who dropped back to third. Ted had a disappointing game and “mishandled on several occasions and this hampered Sissons, his partner”. The “Brimble brothers did not combine effectively. W. Brimble got the ball away sharply, but things then often went wrong, and in flashes only was E. Brimble the sharp penetrative player whom Newton rely upon to give their attack plenty of thrust”. It was possibly his final match of the season as he did not play in their round 1 Roope Rooster loss to City. He was listed to play in their match with Ponsonby for the Phelan Shield but was not mentioned in the match report in a game they lost 20–15 to finish their season.

==== 1939–40 final seasons with Newton ====
The 1939 season was a busy one for Ted in the Newton side. He played in 18 matches though surprisingly failed to score a single try for the first time in his career. They were again competitive in the Fox Memorial competition, finishing third with a 9 win, 1 draw, 6 loss record. He didn't play in their season opening game against Marist on 1 April but appeared in their round 2 loss to Mount Albert on 15 April. They began with 4 losses which made the rest of their season more impressive. The first mention of him was in their loss to Ponsonby on 22 April where he “played a good game at five-eighths”. The brothers “teamed well inside” in their loss to City.

After 2 more matches for Newton, Ted and Wilfred were both selected for Auckland Māori to play South Auckland at Davies Park in Huntly on 28 May. The Auckland Māori side lost the match but no score was ever reported. The day prior he had played well for Newton in their win over Manukau. The Herald noted that “splendid individual efforts by the Brimble brothers were a feature of the game”. They combined in “brilliant runs” which “resulted in Sander scoring, to place the result beyond doubt” and Ted “at five-eighths, showed some of his best form”. Ted was also chosen to play in the Auckland Māori team to play Auckland Pākēha on 5 June at Carlaw Park but it appears that he did not play with Jackie Rata and Bruce Donaldson chosen in the five eighths on the day. He was also selected to play for the Auckland Māori team again for another match at Huntly against South Auckland in mid June.

On 19 June Newton beat Mount Albert 21–7 in round 11. Bert Leatherbarrow, the Mount Albert hooker was not available so Newton won a lot of ball from the scrums and “the Brimble brothers made every use of this advantage and their speed usually resulted in giving the three quarters plenty of room to move”. Wilfred passed magnificently from the scrum and Ted “was also in good form at five-eighths and used his speed to combat the solid play of Banham. In a win over Ponsonby on 24 June the Star wrote that “as usual the Brimble brothers were always in the limelight with Wilfred at halfback sending out long, accurate passes, and E. Brimble at second five-eighth using every opportunity that came his way and giving plenty of openings for his three quarters”. With “perfect understanding by the Brimble brothers [being] a feature of the inside back play”. In a rare recent loss to City in the Newton backs handled well, “especially E. Brimble and Sanders”. Newton then went several matches unbeaten to close out the first grade competition with ted in consistently good form. In the final round they neat Manukau 15–2 on 19 August with the brothers “pairing well” with Ted marking his brother Walter in the Manukau side at five eighth. Ted and Wilfred “stood out as the best players on the ground, smart, well directed passes being a feature of their play”. Ted played in 3 further matches for Newton as they were first eliminated from the Roope Rooster in round 1 by Mt Albert, and then in the Phelan Shield by City after a win over Ponsonby in round 1.

He had travelled down to Wellington as part of his enlistment training in September, 1939 and played a match for Randwick against Addington on September 29.

The 1940 season was to be his last as he enlisted in the war effort midway through the season. Ted missed both of Newton's preseason games but debuted in their opening Fox Memorial game against Marist on 20 April which they won 13–10. They won again the following week 11–6 over Richmond with Ted using “the short kick judiciously, placing the ball to the most advantage”. Then in a 4 May, 20–0 win over Ponsonby the Auckland Star wrote “the mainspring of productive team result emanated from Teddy Brimble, that delightful five-eighth, whom many patrons of the game regretted did not earn recognition for the 1938 New Zealand tour of Australia. Mackenzie, Richards and Sanders reacted to his clever tactics”. They beat Papakura easily 28–5 in round 4 with Ted playing “a heady game and did some good tackling”. Ted and Wilfred's brother Walter then joined the Newton side and the three of them played against Mount Albert on 25 May. Newton won 8 to 6 with Walter being “versatile behind the scrum, varying his attack nicely in at attempt to find weakness in the opposing defence. He combined splendidly with Wilfred and Ted, the trio making many determined efforts to break through with straight running”.

It was reported in the Auckland Star on 8 June that Ted had enlisted in the Second New Zealand Expeditionary Force for the World War 2 effort. In the meantime he continued to play for Newton however in matches against North Shore, Manukau, City, Marist, and Richmond on 13 July. In the match against Richmond and his brothers “were the best of the Newton backs”.

== War effort ==
After enlisting in the war effort in early June Ted went to camp at Papakura as part of the Infantry Reinforcements in mid September. He departed for the war sometime during 1941. At the time of his enlistment his address was said to be 61A Wellesley Street West in Auckland city. He was a private in the 29th (Mixed) Battalion in the Second New Zealand Expeditionary Force, Third Echelon. His occupation at the time was stated as a machinist. He was later attached to the B Force, 8th Brigade, New Zealand 3rd Division. His brothers Cyril, John, Wilfred, and Lionel all fought in the war also. Walter was also drafted but contested having to go to war. Cyril had moved back to Auckland in 1941 and played a few games for Newton before departing for the war himself. The Auckland Star wrote in April 1941 that “Newton without a Brimble, would not appeal to followers of the red and whites, “Bunny” Brimble [Wilfred's nickname] went into camp at Trentham with representative fullback Claude Dempsey, and both will be missing. However Cyril, the elder of the Brimble brothers, a former Merivale (Christchurch) rugby player, and later of Central league, will fill one of the five eighth positions. In August 1941 the result of a New Zealand army rugby team in Suva was reported with a Brimble scoring a try. It is unclear which of the brothers this could have been. They won the match 32 to 9 against a “representative European team”.

On 18 July 1942, it was reported in the New Zealand newspapers that Ted had been wounded in action. The details were not stated and he was part of a list of war casualties that merely showed their names and next of kin which for Ted was his mother, “Mrs J. [Jane] Brimble, Onehunga (mother)”. In August 1942 it was reported that Lionel was missing in the war effort, though he later returned to New Zealand. His next of kin was also listed as their mother Jane, residing in Onehunga. In October 1944 it was reported in the newspapers that Cyril had been wounded. His next of kin was his wife, Mrs. V. W. Brimble of Nelson. In November 1944 it was reported that there had been inter-unit rugby trials involving the Auckland Battalion with Ted one of the players listed as having scored in the matches.

Then in April 1945 it was reported that a large contingent of men had returned from “the Mediterranean theatre of war” with Ted's name amongst them. He still had the rank of private.

== Personal life and death ==
Ted married Pansy Marguerite Milne Postlewaight in Auckland on 26 October 1929. The marriage notice which was published in the Auckland Star said “Brimble-Postlewaight – On October 26, 1929, by Adjutant Goffin, Edward Pierpont, third son of Mr. and Mrs. H. Brimble, of Onehunga, to Pansy Marguerite, third daughter of Mr. and Mrs. J. Postlewaight, of 112, Wellesley Street, Auckland”. They were both aged around 20 at the time of their marriage. Pansy's mother was Christina Postlewaight (née Milne). Christina was of European and Māori heritage with a European father and Māori mother.

On 6 February 1940, it was reported in the New Zealand Herald that Pansy, who was then aged 31, had been “sentenced by Mr. Justice Callan in the Supreme Court… on an admitted charge of wilfully making a false declaration under the Marriage Act”. The counsel said “that the offence was most stupid, and showed a lack of responsibility on the part of the accused, who had never been in trouble before”. The judge said Pansy had “passed herself off as a spinster” when “in fact she was only a deserted wife”, “she was prepared to deceive another man, and almost succeeded in deceiving the registrar”. She was admitted probation for two years and ordered to pay £5 in costs towards the prosecution. They had been living apart since 1937. When Ted went enlisted in 1940 his address was listed as 61A Wellesley Street West and his next of kin (Pansy) was listed as 112 Wellesley Street West which was the same address as her parents from 11 years earlier when they had married. Ten years earlier, aged 21 in 1930 Pansy had been caught stealing a pair of stockings from a Karangahape Road shop in September. She pleaded guilty after placing the stockings in her bag and running from the store. When asked of her circumstances by judge, Mr. F.K. Hunt, SM., at the Police Court, Chief Detective Hammond said “she is married and her husband is working. She herself works in a factory and earns £2 10/ weekly”. When asked what she wanted to steal for she gave no answer. The magistrate imposed a fine of £5, or one month's imprisonment, and ordered her to make restitution of 6/11”. On 1 September 1941, Pansy was granted an undefended divorce from Ted. The Auckland Star piece on it said “Pansy Marguerite Milne Brimble (Mr. Schramm [her lawyer]) was granted a decree nisi of divorce from Edward Pierpont Brimble by Mr. Justice Fair in the Supreme Court to-day. Petitioner gave evidence that about seven years after their marriage she had words with her husband about his friendship with another woman. She said he had to choose between them and he said he would stick to the other one, and agreed it was best that he and petitioner should part. That was in 1937, and she had not since lived with him, but had got a magisterial maintenance order”.

Ted remarried later to Margaret Thelma Laura Aitkin. She had been born in Foxton in the Manawatū-Whanganui region of the North Island in October 1917.

In 1931 electoral rolls it shows that Ted was living with Pansy at 110 Wellesley Street West and he was a labourer. He lived there throughout the 1930s and was still resident there with the same occupation 10 years later in 1941. Following his return from the war the 1946 electoral records showed Ted was living at 21 Devon Street and was working as a labourer. From at least 1949 until 1954 he was residing at 25 Upper Queen Street and still working as a labourer. By 1957 he was living at 167 Nelson Street and had driver listed as his occupation. In the 1960s he had moved to 31 Bond Street and was again working as a driver.

In 1947, on Monday 28 April, Ted's brother Cyril was killed in a fall from a motor lorry. He was aged 48 at the time and died in Hutt Hospital. He had been living on Churton Crescent in Taita. He had been “found unconscious at the corner of Oxford Terrace, Lower Hutt, at 6.30pm on Saturday. He was on his way home, riding alone on the tray of a truck when he apparently fell as the vehicle was rounding a corner. The driver was unaware of the mishap. Brimble was a former Canterbury representative rugby league player, and also played for the Newton club, Auckland. He was married with one child”.

Ted Brimble died on 27 June 1968. He was cremated at Purewa Cemetery in Auckland.
