= Waitakere City Rugby Club =

Rugby Club in Auckland, New Zealand

- Union: Auckland Rugby Union
- Founded: 1962; 64 years ago
- Location: Henderson, Auckland
- Ground: The Trusts Arena (Capacity: 3,000)
- President: Don Urquhart
- Captain: Shaun Russell
- League: Auckland Premier
Team kit

Official website
- www.waitakererugby.co.nz

Waitakere City Rugby Club is a rugby union club based in Henderson, Auckland, at The Douglas Track & Field of Trusts Arena. Established in 1962, it was originally known as the Te Atatū Rugby Club before adopting its current name in 1998. The club is affiliated with the Auckland Rugby Union.

== History ==
The Waitakere City Rugby Club, originally founded in 1962 as the Te Atatū Rugby Club, was established following an initiative by the Auckland Rugby Union to promote rugby in the Te Atatū area. The club began with three junior teams at Te Atatū Park and, by 1967, became affiliated with the Auckland Rugby Union. In 1971, a senior team was introduced, and Te Atatū South Park became the primary venue.

In 1998, the club rebranded as Waitakere City Rugby Football & Sports Club Inc. to reflect its broader regional identity. This coincided with a partnership with the Waitakere City Athletic Club, forming the Waitakere City Rugby & Athletic Trust in 2002. In 2004, the club sold its Te Atatū property and relocated to The Trusts Arena in Henderson. In 2023, the club moved its headquarters to the arena's grandstand building.

2005 Gallaher Shield Final and All Black Influence

One of the most significant moments in Waitakere City Rugby Club's history came in 2005, when the club reached the Gallaher Shield grand final for the first time. The team was captained by former All Black halfback Ofisa Tonu'u, who had won the Shield with Ponsonby the previous season, and featured fellow former All Black Eroni Clarke, who had represented New Zealand in 22 matches.

Waitakere's rise was meteoric. Just a year earlier, they had been competing in Premier Two, ranked outside Auckland's top 10 clubs. Tonu'u not only captained the side but also served as backs coach alongside head coach Pati Maligi, helping steer the team through a remarkable turnaround season.

Despite losing the final to Ponsonby at Eden Park, the campaign marked a historic high point for the West Auckland club. Clarke scored the opening try of the final and was widely credited with being a key influence throughout the season. His time at Waitakere came at the tail end of a decorated career that included over 150 matches for Auckland and 50 for the Blues. He retired the following year after suffering a neck injury while playing for Waitakere against Roskill Districts RFC.

== Recent Seasons ==
On the field, Waitakere has been capable of upsets against more favoured sides. In 2017, they defeated traditional heavyweights Manukau Rovers in a surprise victory that was noted by Auckland Rugby Union as one of the standout results of the season.

In recent years, Waitakere Rugby Club has received growing media attention for its competitive efforts in Auckland's premier club rugby competitions. In a 2022 feature by the New Zealand Herald, the club was profiled ahead of a pivotal match against Manukau Rovers after a heavy defeat to Grammar Tec, highlighting their push for redemption and growth following seasons of struggle in the Gallaher Shield competition. The article emphasized the club's commitment to rebuilding its squad and culture, as well as its deep roots in the West Auckland community, noting their strong home-ground support and emphasis on developing local talent.

In 2024, the Auckland Rugby Union implemented a major restructure of its senior men's competitions, streamlining the Gallaher Shield to a 10-team Division 1 format. As part of the changes, Waitakere City Rugby Club, along with several others, was reassigned to Division 2. The decision marked a significant shift in the club's competitive status, as it ended a long-standing presence in Auckland's top flight.

== Notable players ==
Waitakere City Rugby Club has been home to several players who have gone on to achieve success at the highest levels of New Zealand rugby. Notable alumni include All Blacks such as Malcom Dick, Michael Jones, Eroni Clarke, Caleb Clarke, Ofisa Tonu'u, and Kees Meeuws, the latter being inducted into the club's Hall of Fame. Black Ferns player Te Kura Ngata-Aerengamate started playing rugby at the age of five in Waitakere. Former Blues, Chiefs and Samoa representative Leo Lafaiali'i played for the club during the 2000 season. Abraham Papali'i, a former NRL player for the Sydney Roosters, played for Waitakere City Rugby Club in 2019 during his transition to rugby union before being contracted by the Bay of Plenty Steamers.
