= List of indoor arenas in New Zealand =

The following is a list of indoor arenas in New Zealand. Most of the arenas in this list have multiple uses such as individual sports, team sports as well as cultural events and political events. The arenas in the table are ranked by capacity; the arenas with the highest capacities are listed first.

== Current arenas ==
#	Image	Arena	Capacity	City	Home team(s)	Opened/Renovated
1		Spark Arena	12,000	Auckland	New Zealand Breakers	2007
2		Wolfbrook Arena	9,000	Christchurch	Mainland Tactix	1998
3		Globox Arena	6,000	Hamilton	Waikato Bay of Plenty Magic	2011
4		TSB Arena	6,000	Wellington	Richter City Roller Derby; Wellington Saints; Central Pulse	1995–2005
5		Fly Palmy Arena	5,000	Palmerston North	Manawatu Jets	2004
6		The Trusts Arena	4,901	Auckland	Northern Mystics; Waitakere City	2004
7		Trustpower Arena	4,600	Mount Maunganui		2011
8		TSB Stadium	4,500	New Plymouth	Taranaki Airs	1992
9		Eventfinda Stadium	4,179	Auckland	Auckland Tuatara	1992
10		Stadium Southland	4,019	Invercargill	Southern Steel; Southland Sharks	2000
11		Energy Events Centre	3,500	Rotorua	Waikato Bay of Plenty Magic	2007
12		Te Rauparaha Arena	3,000	Porirua	Central Pulse	2008
13		Edgar Centre	2,880	Dunedin	Otago Nuggets	1995–2005
14		Queen Elizabeth Youth Centre	2,580	Tauranga		2006
15		Pettigrew Green Arena	2,500	Napier	Hawke's Bay Hawks	2003
16		Franklin Pool and Leisure Centre	1,100	Pukekohe	Franklin Bulls	2021

== See also ==
- List of indoor arenas
- List of stadiums in New Zealand
