= Jack Dunn (rugby union) =

- Full name: John Markham Dunn
- Born: 17 November 1918 Otahuhu, New Zealand
- Died: 4 June 2003 (aged 84) Papakura, New Zealand
- Height: 183 cm (6 ft 0 in)
- Weight: 89 kg (196 lb)
- School: Ararimu School

Rugby union career
- Position: Wing
International career
Years	Team	Apps	(Points)
1946	New Zealand	1	(0)

John Markham Dunn (17 November 1918 — 4 June 2003) was a New Zealand rugby union international.

Raised in Auckland, Dunn attended Ararimu School and played his rugby for various South Auckland clubs, including the Manukau Rovers. He made his Auckland representative debut in 1943.

Dunn, a sizable wing three-quarter, was capped once by the All Blacks, against the Wallabies at Carisbrook in the 1st Test of the 1946 home Bledisloe Cup series. He got outplayed by his opposite winger Charlie Eastes in an All Blacks loss and was replaced by Eric Boggs in the team for Eden Park.

== See also ==
- List of New Zealand national rugby union players
