= List of stadiums in New Zealand =

The following is a list of stadiums in New Zealand, ordered by capacity.

Stadiums with a capacity of 10,000 or larger are included. It can be difficult to determine the exact capacity of a stadium as many have different capacities for different kinds of events (for example, concerts and sporting events) and they may be able to temporarily expand their capacity on special occasions.

An asterisk indicates that tenants only use the venue for some of the matches.

== Current stadiums ==
#	Image	Stadium	Capacity	City	Home team(s)
1		Eden Park	50,000	Auckland	Cricket: Auckland Cricket Team; Rugby league: New Zealand Warriors, NRL Auckland Nines; Rugby union: Blues, Auckland rugby union team
2		Wellington Regional Stadium	34,500	Wellington	Rugby union: Hurricanes, Wellington Lions; Football: Wellington Phoenix FC, New Zealand national football team*
3		Forsyth Barr Stadium	30,748	Dunedin	Football: Otago United, Southern United FC; Rugby union: Otago, Highlanders
4		Te Kaha	30,000 (with temporary stands)	Christchurch	Rugby union: Crusaders, Canterbury
5		Mount Smart Stadium	27,000 (with temporary stands)	Auckland	Rugby league: New Zealand Warriors; Football: Auckland FC
6		Rotorua International Stadium	26,000	Rotorua	Rugby union: Bay of Plenty, Chiefs
7		Waikato Stadium	25,000	Hamilton	Rugby union: Waikato Rugby Union, Chiefs, Rugby sevens: New Zealand national rugby sevens team
8		Stadium Taranaki	25,000	New Plymouth	Cricket: Central Districts cricket team; Football: Team Taranaki; Rugby league: Taranaki rugby league team; Rugby union: Chiefs, Hurricanes, Taranaki Rugby Football Union
9		McLean Park	23,700	Napier	Cricket: Central Districts Stags; Rugby union: Hurricanes, Hawke's Bay Rugby Union
10		Cooks Gardens	20,700	Whanganui	Rugby union: Whanganui Rugby Football Union; Athletics; Cycling
11		Owen Delany Park	20,000	Taupō	Cricket: Northern Districts men's cricket team; Rugby union: King Country Rugby Football Union
12		Mercury Baypark Stadium	19,800	Tauranga	Motorsport: Bay of Plenty Speedway Association
13		Queenstown Events Centre	19,000	Queenstown	Cricket: Otago Volts; Football: Otago United; Rugby union: Otago Rugby Football Union, Highlanders
14		Northland Events Centre	18,500	Whangārei	Cricket: Northern Districts men's cricket team; Rugby union: Northland Rugby Union, Highlanders
15		Rugby League Park	18,000	Christchurch	Rugby league: Canterbury rugby league team, South Island; Rugby union: Crusaders
16		Trafalgar Park	18,000	Nelson	Football: Tasman United; Rugby union: Tasman Rugby Union
17		Rugby Park Stadium	17,000	Invercargill	Rugby union: Rugby Southland
18		Arena Manawatu	15,000	Palmerston North	Football: Wellington Phoenix FC; Motorsport: Robertson Prestige International Speedway; Rugby league: Manawatu rugby league team; Rugby union: Hurricanes Manawatu Turbos
19		North Harbour Stadium	14,000	Auckland	Football: New Zealand national football team; Rugby union: North Harbour Rugby Union, Moana Pasifika
20		Bay Oval	12,000	Tauranga	
21		Navigation Homes Stadium	12,000	Pukekohe	Rugby union: Counties Manukau
22		Fraser Park	12,000	Timaru	Rugby union: South Canterbury
23		Basin Reserve	11,600	Wellington	Cricket: Wellington Firebirds, New Zealand national cricket team
24		Seddon Park	10,500	Hamilton	Cricket: New Zealand national cricket team

== See also ==
- List of Oceanian stadiums by capacity
- List of indoor arenas in New Zealand
- Lists of stadiums
