= The Trusts Arena =

Indoor arena located in Henderson, Auckland, New Zealand

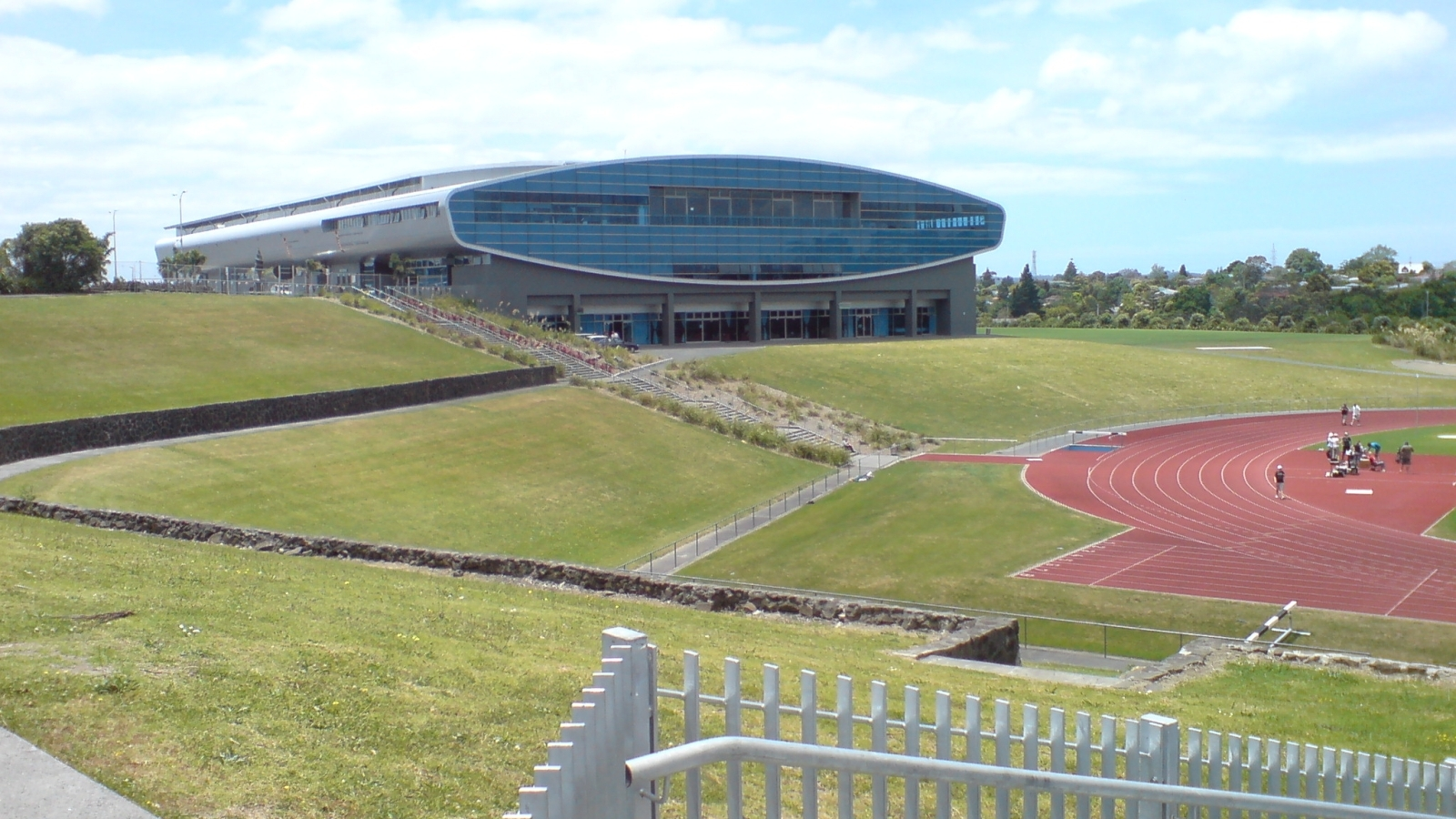
- Interactive map of The Trusts Arena
- Location: 65–67 Central Park Drive, Henderson, New Zealand
- Coordinates: 36°51′36″S 174°38′10.32″E
- Owner: Waitakere City Stadium Trust
- Capacity: 4,901

Construction
- Opened: 11 September 2004
- Cost: $26 million NZD
- Architects: Warren and Mahoney

Tenants
- Northern Mystics (ANZ Championship) (2008–present); Waitakere City Athletics Club (1984–present); Waitakere City Rugby Club (Gallaher Shield) (2004–present); Waitakere United (NZFC) (2004–2021); Auckland Stars (NZNBL) (2005–2009); Netball World Championship (2007); Badminton World Junior Championship (2007); Waitakere Rangers (BCC) (2006–2007); Auckland Diamonds (NBC) (2004–2007); New Zealand Breakers (ANBL) (2004–2006; 2021); Super City Rangers (NZNBL) (2013–2018)

The Trusts Arena is an indoor arena located in Henderson, Auckland, New Zealand. It is a multi-purpose stadium that primarily holds sports events and music concerts. The arena was opened by then prime minister of New Zealand Helen Clark on 11 September 2004. It holds 4,901 people. Adjacent to the stadium is an outdoor athletics facility known as the Douglas Track and Field, which has a capacity of 3,000 people.

The sporting complex has been the home of many sporting teams, with the current arena tenant being the Northern Mystics of the ANZ Championship. Clubs based at the adjacent Douglas Track and Field include Waitakere City Athletics Club, Waitakere City Rugby Club, and Waitakere United of the New Zealand Football Championship.

== Douglas Track and Field ==
The outdoor stadium attached to the Trusts Arena is known as the Douglas Track and Field. The facility currently caters for athletics, rugby and association football. Waitakere City Athletic Club, Waitakere City Rugby Club and Waitakere United are based at the stadium. The stadium is used as the training ground for the All Blacks when preparing for matches in Auckland. The stadium was home to the now-defunct rugby league team Waitakere Rangers of the Bartercard Cup competition, and has also served as a training ground for the New Zealand Warriors of the NRL. The stadium also hosted the 2010 Australasian Gaelic Games.

== Notable performances ==
- Heavy metal band Slipknot play their first New Zealand show, with their All Hope Is Gone World Tour on 22 October 2008.
- Grammy Nominated and American Idol runner up Adam Lambert play his first New Zealand show, with his Glam Nation Tour on 17 October 2010.
- Glam rock singer Alice Cooper played a show with his No More Mr. Nice Guy Tour on 22 September 2011, then returned as part of his Spend the Night with Alice Cooper Tour on 27 October 2017.
- Boy band One Direction played their first headlining tour in New Zealand, with their Up All Night Tour on 21 April 2012 respectively.
- Take That played their first shows in New Zealand, in Auckland and Wellington, with their Wonderland Live tour arriving here on 22 November 2017.
- The Prodigy played their last gig on 5 February 2019 with frontman Keith Flint before his death on 4 March 2019.
- Joker Xue, a Chinese singer-songwriter, played his first New Zealand show, headlining the arena as part of his Skyscraper World Tour on 4 April 2019.
- Post Malone, American hip-hop artist, played his first New Zealand show on 15 January 2018. The show was moved to Trusts Arena from a smaller venue as tickets initially sold out in minutes.
- Fall Out Boy, an American tock band, played a concert here on 7 March 2018.
- Limp Bizkit, an American nu metal/rap metal/rap rock band also played here on 17 March 2018.

== Boxing ==
The Trusts Arena has hosted over more than a dozen of notable boxing events from various promotions, including Duco Events and Super 8. This venue has been so popular for boxing promoters that it has earned the title of New Zealand's Home of Boxing and New Zealand's Boxing Arena. The arena has its own boxing gym, called Arena Boxing.

=== Notable fights ===
- 16 April 2016: Kali Reis vs. Maricela Cornejo for the vacant WBC world female middleweight title. Also featured on the card were Melissa St. Vil vs Baby Nansen and Ronica Jeffrey vs Gentiane Lupi, both for WBC silver titles in their respective weight divisions. This was the first time in history that one of the four major boxing sanctioning bodies held a world title fight in New Zealand.
- 15 October 2015: Joseph Parker fought and defeated Kali Meehan for the WBO Oriental & African heavyweight title, vacant WBA Oceania & PABA heavyweight title and vacant WBC Eurasia Pacific Boxing Council heavyweight & OPBF heavyweight title.
- 16 October 2014: Joseph Parker defeated Sherman Williams while retaining the WBA – PABA and WBO Oriental heavyweight titles.
- 4 June 2014: Kali Meehan won the first Super 8 Tournament. This heavyweight tournament involved highly credentialed boxers like Michael Sprott, Hasim Rahman, Alonzo Butler, Lawrence Tauasa and Martin Rogan.
- 14 December 2013: Brian Minto Defeated Shane Cameron for the Vacant WBO Oriental heavyweight title.
- 13 June 2013: Joseph Parker Defeated Frans Botha. On the same night Arlene Blencowe defeated Daniella Smith for the Vacant WIBA and WBF women's world titles.
- 31 March 2010: David Tua defeated Friday Ahunanya while retaining the WBO Asia Pacific & Oriental heavyweight titles.

== See also ==
- List of indoor arenas in New Zealand
