= Manukau Rovers RFC =

NZ rugby union club, based in Auckland

Coordinates: 36.9682014°S 174.7917150°E

(New Zealand) Manukau Rovers Rugby Football Club
- Union: Auckland Rugby Football Union
- Founded: 1885; 141 years ago
- Location: Māngere, Auckland
- Ground: Williams Park
- President: Jonathan Tukerangi
- League: Auckland Premier

Official website
- www.facebook.com/ManukauRovers/

Manukau Rovers Rugby Football Club is a rugby union club based in Auckland, New Zealand. The club was established in 1885 and is affiliated with the Auckland Rugby Football Union. In 1912, the club seceded to rugby league, although after a few years returned to rugby union. Since 1972, the club have been based at Williams Park in Māngere, fielding numerous senior and junior teams, catering to both men and women.

== Honours ==
Manukau have won the Gallaher Shield on four occasions, in 1968, 1973 and 2022 also again in 2023

== All Blacks ==
The club have produced five All Blacks, the most recent of these being Frank Bunce. Others include Mack Herewini, Barry Thomas, Jack Dunn and Cyril Pepper.
