= 1944 Auckland Rugby League season =

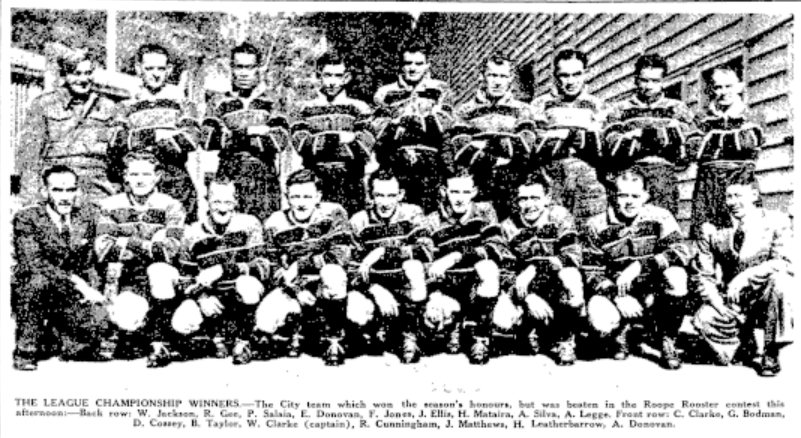
City Rovers, Fox Memorial champions of 1944

The 1944 Auckland Rugby League season was its 36th. The Auckland Rugby League allowed the Point Chevalier club to enter the first grade competition which meant that it was an even ten teams. There was no reserve grade competition as the war affected adult playing numbers once more. Several former senior players were killed along with others who had played or been involved in Auckland rugby league.

The City Rovers won the Fox Memorial first grade championship for the 8th time in their history, however it was their first championship for 19 years after last winning it in 1925. Their titles prior to 1944 were in 1910, 1911, 1916, 1921, 1922, 1923, and 1925. City also won the Rukutai Shield for being in the lead at the conclusion of the first round of the championship. Their season was nearly derailed when they protested the suspension of Eugene Donovan who was sent off in a match against Richmond for back chatting referee George Kelly. City refused to play their round 12 and round 13 matches and lost by default as a result. The league informed them that they were disqualified from the championship and would be awarded no further competition points regardless of their results according to rules laid out in their constitution regarding successive unfulfilled fixtures. They had a change of mind however and allowed them to compete for the championship. City won their last 5 matches to force a playoff for the championship with Mount Albert United who were level with them on 26 competition points. City won the match 17 to 7 to claim the title.

Ponsonby United won the Roope Rooster knockout trophy for the 6th time when they beat North Shore Albions in the final 19–13 on October 14. Both teams had had disappointing Fox Memorial seasons but Ponsonby had steadily improved in the second half of the competition, particularly after their coach, Arthur Kay came out of retirement to take the playing field. City won their third trophy of the season when they defeated Ponsonby 15–11 in the Stormont Shield champion of champions match on October 21 to conclude the season. The Phelan Shield was not competed for owing to the length of the season.

Once again the representative season was relatively short, in part due to the length of the club season, but also because there were restrictions on war time travel, especially by rail. Teams needed to be given government permits to travel and the West Coast was unable to obtain one of these for an intended visit to Carlaw Park, and Wellington had the same issue. Auckland beat South Auckland (Waikato) 36 to 5 at Carlaw Park, however a weakened Auckland side with 4 clubs playing in Roope Rooster matches in the same day lost the return match in Huntly 12–10. Auckland Māori defeated Auckland Pākehā 18 to 13 in what had become an annual fixture at Carlaw Park on September 9. The North Island – South Island fixture was played for the first time since 1939 season before a crowd of 16,000 with the North Island winning 43 to 15 with 10 of the 13 North Island players from Auckland.

Preceded by 1943	36th Auckland Rugby League season 1944	Succeeded by 1945

== Annual General Meeting ==
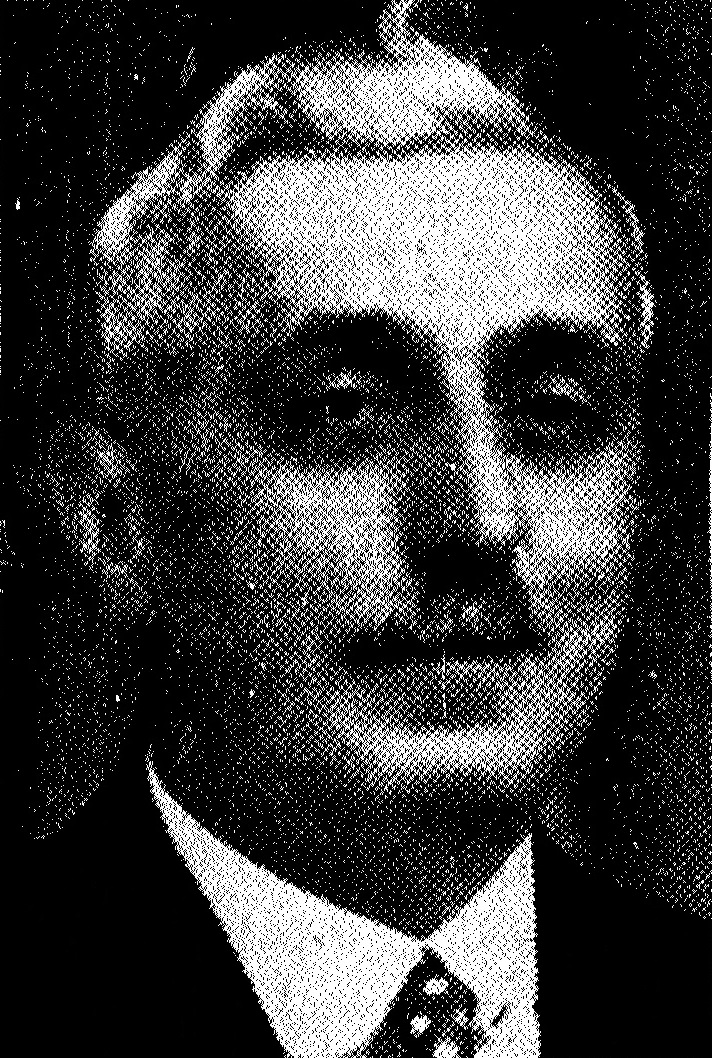
Joe Sayegh

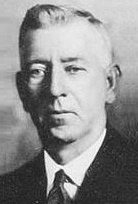
Ted Phelan

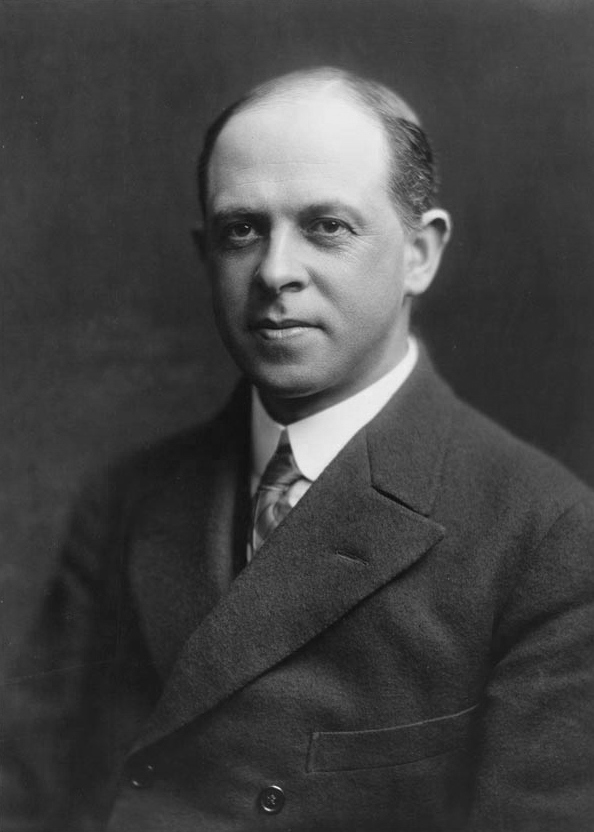
Sir Ernest Davis

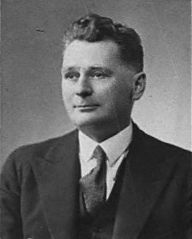
Bill Schramm

Prior to the annual meeting the 34th annual report was released. It stated that "from a financial point of view the league is making steady progress. The total assets are £10,785, from which must be deducted liabilities amounting to £1,519. Assets show and increase of £42, and liabilities a decrease of £416. The surplus for the season was £223". There had been an increase of £4320 in revenue due to better attendance at matches at Carlaw Park, and also through hiring the park out during the off-season to sports such as baseball. They had collected gate receipts of £3,972 from club games and the three representative matches "which compared very favourably with the best seasons".

The annual meeting was held on Tuesday, March 28 in the League Rooms on Courthouse Lane at 7:30 pm. At the meeting chairman Mr. J.W. Watson said "we are providing football for 1300 players every Saturday". He went on to say that the schoolboys' organisation had a very successful season with 30 teams in the competition. The organisation had "done splendid work for the boys. They had decided to set up a board of control to govern schoolboy football, which would be similar to the junior board of control". He went on to say that "there were 10 junior teams, with about 600 players. He urged the senior clubs to take a greater interest in the juniors. In the senior grade they had nine teams, with about 150 players. The large number of players in the game showed... how wide flung the activities of the Rugby League were". He also paid tribute to the work of the referees and believed that "after the war there would be a great swing to sport of all kinds. At present there were just enough playing grounds, and he considered the local bodies should provide more grounds for the future". Mr. Dickson made reference to the illness of the president and former chairman Mr. G. Grey Campbell, "and a unanimous vote of sympathy was passed, with wishes for a speedy recovery".

The following officers were elected: Patron, Mr. J.B. Donald; vice patron, Mr. J.F.W. Dickson; president Mr. George Grey Campbell; vice presidents, Sir Ernest Davis, Messrs J. Donald, C. Drysdale, H. Grange, R.J. Laird, W.J. Lovett, MP Frederick William (Bill) Schramm, W. Wallace, J.L. Coakley, T.G. Symonds, G.T. Wright, R.H. Wood, H. Walmsley, Joe Sayegh, Richard (Dick) H. Benson, Allan J Moody, H.W. Gray, B Brigham, N. Kyle, L.H. Heard, F.J. Osborne, J.R. Simpson, R. Newport, Joseph Patrick Moodabe; trustees Messrs J.W. Watson, Edward John (Ted) Phelan, A. Stormont; chairman Mr. J.W. Watson; deputy-chairman, Mr. Edward John Phelan; auditors, Messrs Garrard and Bennett; honorary solicitor, Mr. H.M. Rogerson; delegate to New Zealand Rugby League, Mr. R. Doble; club delegates to board of control Messrs Jim Clark, T. Davis, W.J. Probert and D. Wilkie; honorary secretary Mr. Ivan Culpan; honorary treasurer Mr. R. Doble. In October Mr. T. Davis resigned from his position on the board of control. Mr. F.T. McAneny was appointed in his position for the remainder of the season.

== Senior competition ==
Ten teams were nominated for the senior Fox Memorial championship: Manukau, Richmond, Ponsonby, Newton, Marist, City, North Shore, Otahuhu, Mt Albert, and Point Chevalier. All of these teams had taken part in the previous season with the exception of Point Chevalier who had applied to join. The Auckland Rugby League at their board of control meeting on March 28 decided to ask the club to send two officials to the next board meeting to give information as to the playing strength of the team. The application of Point Chevalier was accepted to participate in the preliminary round which would begin on April 15. They were to play the curtain raiser to the principal match on the main field at Carlaw Park against Otahuhu. As there would now be 5 senior matches per round one would need to be played away from Carlaw Park each week and in the first round of preliminary games the Richmond match with Marist was scheduled for Grey Lynn Park.

At the May 10 meeting of the board of control it was recommended by the Senior Club Officers Association that during the 1944 season senior clubs should be allowed to play first juniors (second grade players) as seniors and vice versa without the requirement for them to be regraded. The recommendation was accepted. At the May 24 meeting it was suggested by the Referees Association that teams in the early games at Carlaw Park remain on the field at halftime and not retire to the dressing rooms. The reason was that the games were late to kick off in the second half. The request was declined with Mr. R. Doble stating that this procedure had been attempted years ago and was not a success then. It was decided to enforce the rule about getting players out in time.

With there being ten teams and five matches in each round it meant that one match would have to be played away from Carlaw Park each weekend. The grounds used were Devonport Domain (5), Grey Lynn Park (4), Walker Park in Point Chevalier (4), Fowlds Park in Morningside (3), Sturges Park in Otahuhu (1), Ellerslie Domain (1), and Onehunga School (1).

At the June 21 meeting of the board it was suggested that the second round of the competition be split into two as some teams were well out of contention already, Pt Chevalier had 1 win and 7 losses while Newton had lost all 8 of their matches. Mr. R. Doble said "that a keen second round was assured, but there were some teams hopelessly out of the competition". Mr. J. Clark suggested that the senior officers' association should be consulted before any change was made and it was decided to defer any decision until after the final matches in the first round were played.

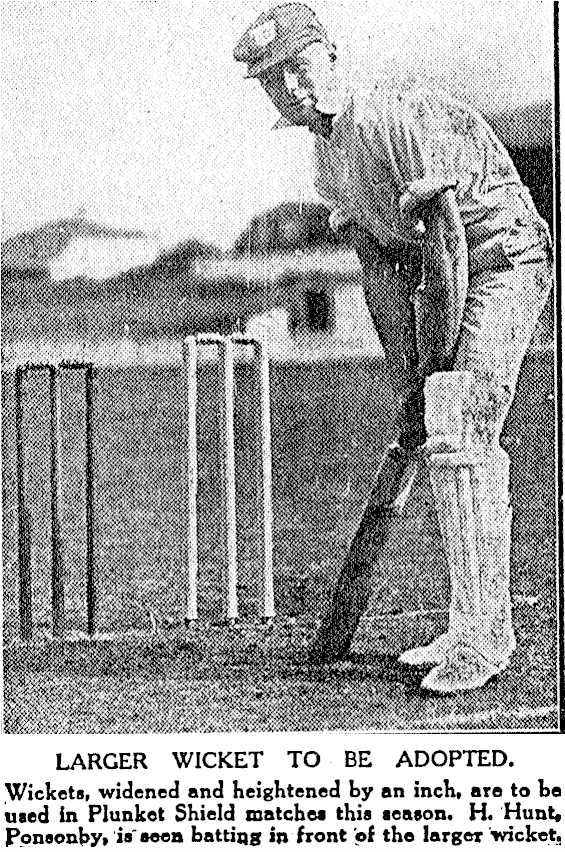

Horace Hunt, the North Shore captain was awarded a gold medal donated by Mr. J.F.W. Dickson for the most sportsmanlike players. Hunt had been connected to the North Shore club since 1926 when he was in his teens. He captained the North Shore reserve grade side when they won the inaugural reserve grade championship in 1931. He began playing in their senior side in 1932 when they won the championship. He had retired in 1939 and played a season of soccer before returning to the North Shore league side which had been depleted by the war effort. When Verdun Scott left for the war in 1941 Hunt took over the captaincy and North Shore won the championship for the 6th time. He also played cricket for the R.V. club in the city and Suburban senior competition and had represented Auckland in the Plunket Shield as wicket keeper four times in 1930 and 1931.

At the board of control meeting on October 11 a letter "was received from the Point Chevalier club in reference to an increase in the transfer club fee from £2 to £10. It was decided that the time was not opportune to amend the existing regulations".

== Protest defaults of City Rovers ==
In their round 12 win over Richmond the City side had Eugene Donovan ordered off the field for insulting the referee. Eugene was the brother of fellow City player Alan Donovan and senior referee Jack Donovan. They had a fourth brother who was killed in the war. The Auckland Rugby League decided to force Donovan to apologise to the referee to avoid suspension and after he failed to do this he was unable to play. The City club decided to default their match against Manukau despite efforts still being made at 2 pm on match day to solve the issue. They were due to play the feature game on the number 1 field at 3:10 pm. The City club supplied the Auckland Star with the following statement "in the game between Richmond and City, played at Carlaw Park on Saturday, July 8, Eugene Donovan, of city, was ordered off for alleged back-answering to the referee, Mr. George Kelly, ten minutes after the commencement of the game. The City five-eight, Pouvi Salaia, had just scored a try, and Donovan was retiring back to the halfway line, along with Bert Leatherbarrow, when he passed a remark to his team mate. ‘If City's tries are not clear cut this chap won't allow them'. "The referee overheard the remark, and said ‘any more of that and you will go off'. Donovan replied that he was talking to his team mate, and the referee said that he did not care who he was talking to. "Donovan then replied that he would talk to his team mate anytime he wanted to. The referee then ordered him off". These remarks can be corroborated by other City players. After the match the referee and Donovan were ordered to appear before the judicial committee or the control board, when conflicting evidence of the two men concerned was given, at the conclusion of which Donovan was ordered to apologise. This he refused to do as he claimed that he had told the truth and to apologise would be a confession of guilt. He then left the room. "Questioned by the City club officials, E. Donovan declared that he had told the truth and that he would rather hang up his boots than apologise for an offence he had not committed. A special meeting of the senior team and club officials was called before the game (Manukau and City last Saturday). It was unanimously resolved that the club endorse the attitude of E. Donovan". It was also noted later that referee George Kelly had not asked for an apology. City then defaulted for a second consecutive Saturday when they refused to play their match against Marist on July 22 at Carlaw Park. Following round 13 the suspension of Donovan was lifted however as the City club had defaulted on two successive Saturdays, under the league constitution were disqualified from the championship. The controversy rolled on however as the city club found out after Watson's statement after their meeting to the press that they would receive no competition points for any of their remaining matches. And they also disagreed with the implication that Donovan had apologised to the referee. "This is contrary to fact and cannot be substantiated". It was then announced on August 12 that City would in fact be allowed to accrue competition points over the remainder of the season.

== Fostering of junior grades ==
In October at the board of control meeting various speakers strongly urged the need to stimulate junior football in Auckland. Chairman Watson said "clubs which do not make an effort to foster junior football are doomed to extinction". He went on to add that "the real work of the league clubs was to foster juniors, and pointed to clubs like Richmond. Otahuhu, and Mount Albert, now strong numerically and financially. The Point Chevalier Club was coming to the front through its encouragement of junior football". The chairman of the Schoolboys' Control Board, Mr. Maurice Wetherill said that "the board had functioned well, and its members were keen to help school league football. It was felt that they did not get the publicity that they should. They were up against stronger opposition than any other branch of the league code. An effort to interest headmasters of schools had, up to a point, been successful. At the Mount Albert school the code had received splendid support, and there they had had use of what was regarded as the best all-weather ground in Auckland". Mr. H. Howe, the deputy-chairman of the Junior Control Board, said "they had had the best season for years, and in the third and fourth grades there had been brilliant football. If the senior teams gave more attention to the juniors there would be no necessity to look for players from the rugby union. Ivan Sumich was an example of a young player who had risen from the league juniors". Mr. L. Rout, secretary of the Schoolboys' control Board said there was a wonderful opportunity for league football in New Zealand... in Auckland they had gone a log way with schoolboy football, but they would have to go further. He hoped to see the code taken up by all the schools, and would like to see it carried into the secondary schools. The success of Sumich had been mentioned, but there were dozens of others, and one could point to Ron McGregor, of the Richmond club. Fifty percent of the senior players came from the schoolboy ranks.

== Carlaw Park ==
During the annual meeting in March, chairman Watson said that "during the off-season the management committee and trustees had decided to make improvement to Carlaw Park and, once building restrictions were eased, it was proposed to cover, in portions, the terraces on the main ground. The erection of specially-designed gates at the entrance to the park in the form of a war memorial was also intended". At the June 7 board meeting it was decided to provide a permanent place in the grandstand for any disabled soldiers. At the July 5 meeting chairman Watson said that "despite bad weather there has been a considerable increase in the gate takings at Carlaw Park this season", and added that it had been the biggest revenue for the past four seasons.

== Availability of grounds ==
At the board of control meeting on May 17 the issue of ground availability was raised. Chairman Watson said "that for years the increasing shortage of playing grounds in the different suburbs had been pointed out, and the difficulty was being faced by all codes". He went on to refer to "the number of playing grounds lost through being taken over by the Armed Forces".

== All Golds Old Boys Association Sunday matches ==
During the season the All Golds Old Boys Association organised matches on Sundays at Walker Park in Point Chevalier. They had initially established themselves as the New Zealand Rugby League Old Boys Association before changing their name due to not having any official affiliation with New Zealand Rugby League. The matches attracted very large crowds ranging from 2 to 4,000 and featured players who had played on Saturday or rugby players which caused considerable concern for Auckland Rugby which sought to ban any of their registered players for taking part. Auckland Council had given permission for the matches and provided extra tramcars to meet the demand. On the morning of July 14 Auckland Rugby League chairman Watson released a statement saying "the organisation carrying on Sunday football at Walker Park is not connected with the Auckland Rugby League". And continued "it should be understood that the league is not in favour of organised Sunday football and considers that the competition at present being played on Sundays is not in the best interests of the game. We feel that there is room in Auckland for only one competition, and that should be the one conducted by the official body". The Auckland Council then prohibited the playing of football at Walker Park, Point Chevalier on Sundays after passing a resolution on July 14. Protests had been received from two churches (Point Chevalier Presbyterian Church and Point Chevalier Baptist Church) and five residents in the vicinity of the park. The Auckland Transport Board had also asked the council for their attitude on the games. Their regular services had become so overcrowded taking spectators to the matches that ordinary passengers were unable to ride. The council decided to inform the New Zealand All Golds Old Boys Association Social Club that "the holding of organised football on Walker Park on Sundays constituted an entertainment for which the consent of the council was required under section 313 of the Municipal Corporations Act.

== Representative team ==
At the May 17 board of control meeting the appointments were made for the three Auckland selectors for the representative season. They were Robert Doble, Jim Clark, and Jack Kirwan. It was originally intended to play a match against South Auckland (Waikato) in early June however advice was received from Huntly that the government had asked the miners to work on Monday, June 5 which was King's Birthday, and it "was considered the match should be postponed until a later date". Auckland received requests for matches at Carlaw Park by South Auckland, West Coast, and Wellington. However Auckland had difficulty in scheduling the matches due to war time travel restrictions with permission needing to be obtained from the government. In late June the league received advice that railway travel permits were not going to be granted for the West Coast team. The West Coast union decided to apply for permission again at a later date.

Jim Clark was appointed the manager of the side prior to their first match with South Auckland.

== Obituaries ==
=== Donald McFarlane McKenzie ===
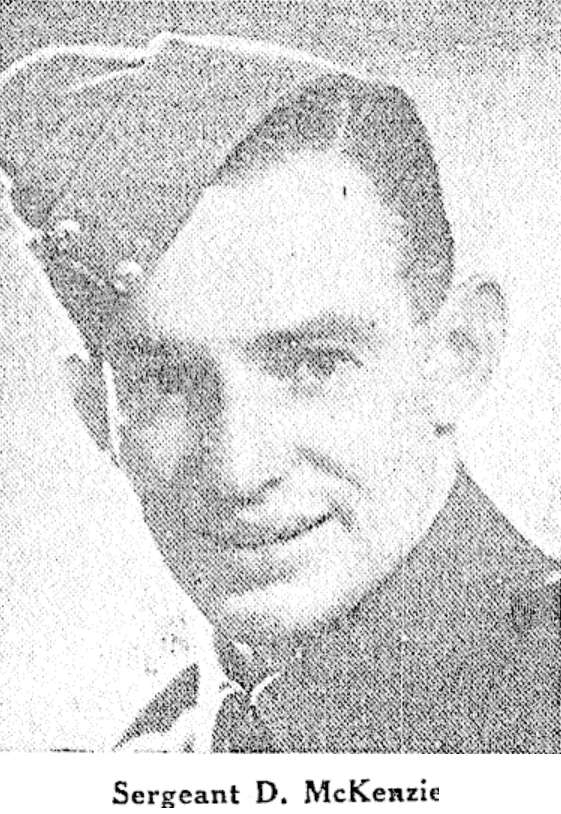

On 24 February it was reported that Sergeant Donald McFarlane McKenzie "has now been reported lost at sea". McKenzie had been on an enemy ship (Nino Bixio) in the Mediterranean when it was torpedoed on August 17, 1942, while it was transporting prisoners to Italy from North Africa. He had entered the army in October 1940 and departed New Zealand in September 1941 as part of an early reinforcement draft, seeing service in the desert campaigns. McKenzie has been educated at Te Puke High School before later moving to Auckland where he played for the Newton Rangers first grade side. From 1938 to 1939 McKenzie scored 7 tries in 16 first grade matches. He was aged 26 at the time of his death and survived by his wife Elsie Edith McKenzie, and his parents James and Mary McKenzie. McKenzie is memorialised at the Alamein Memorial in the El Alamein War Cemetery in Egypt, on the Roll of Honour at Greyfriars Presbyterian Church on Mt Eden Road, Auckland, and at the Auckland War Memorial Museum, WW2 Hall of Memories.

=== William Henry Inglis ===
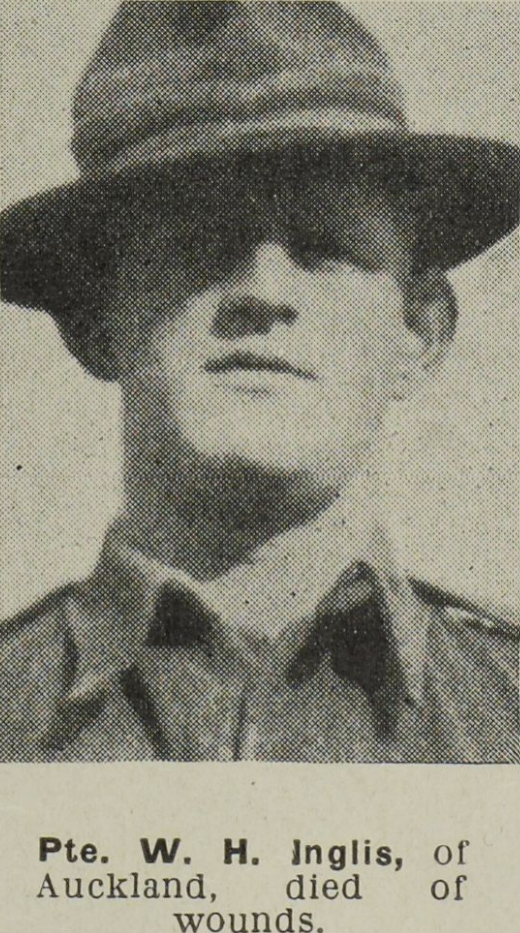
William Henry Inglis

On March 17, 1944, William Henry Inglis died in Italy from wounds sustained in WW2 aged 21 year 10 months. He played at least 14 senior games for Manukau in 1942 and 1943 scoring three tries. Inglis had debuted on the wing on August 22 in a match against Ponsonby. He was part of the New Zealand Infantry Brigade in the Second New Zealand Expeditionary Force. Inglis was posthumously awarded the War Medal 1939-1945 and the New Zealand War Service Medal. He was single and lived with his father and mother (William Henry Inglis senior and Matilda Inglis) in Sandringham at the time of his enlistment and worked as a factory hand. He was buried in Cassino War Cemetery, Italy. Inglis is memorialised at the Auckland War Memorial Museum in the World War 2 Hall of Memories.

=== Rauaroa Tangaroapeau (Bill) Turei ===
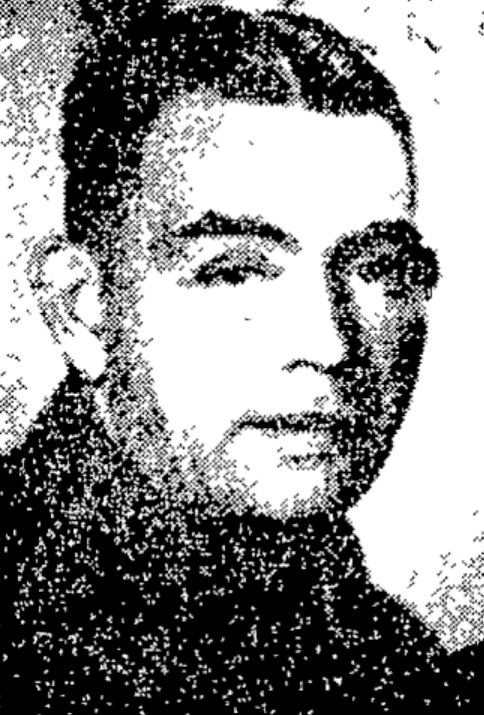
Rauaroa Tangaroapeau (Bill) Turei

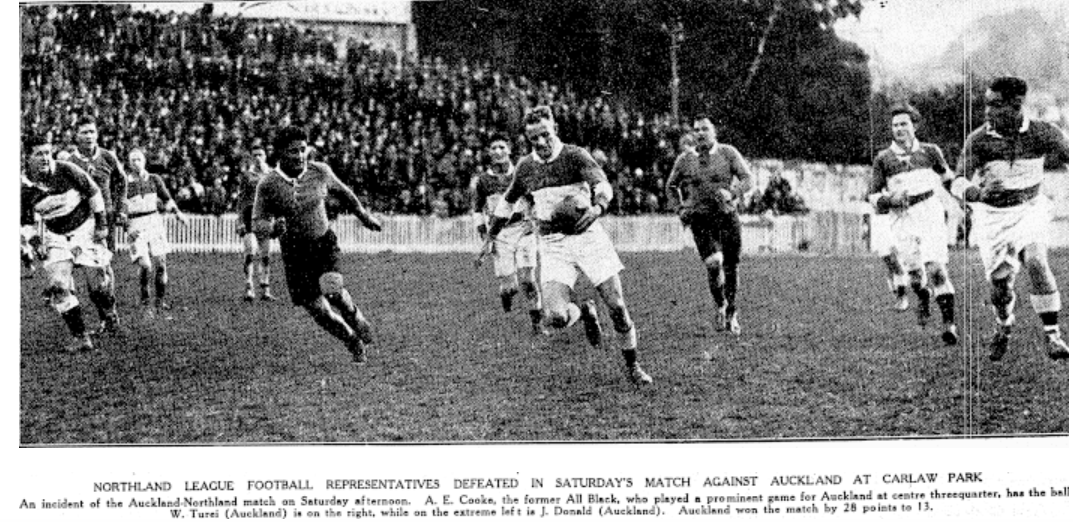
Turei in support of Bert Cooke in the Auckland match with Northland at Carlaw Park.

Rauaroa Tangaroapeau Turei, better known as Bill Turei was a winger and full back who played for City Rovers from 1932 to 1935. He died of natural causes on April 15, 1944, while in Italy. He was a staff sergeant in the 2nd Māori Battalion and had enlisted in 1941 and went overseas with a reinforcement draft in May, 1943. Turei was educated at Auckland Boys Grammar and Te Aute College. In 1933 he represented Auckland in 4 matches, scoring 5 tries and kicking a conversion. In his debut match against Taranaki on June 10, 1933, he scored 3 tries in a 32–20 win at Carlaw Park. He played against South Auckland on July 15, before scoring 2 tries and kicking a conversion in a match with Taranaki at Western Park in New Plymouth. His final match was against North Auckland on August 12 where he played in the centres alongside Bert Cooke. For City he scored 24 tries, and kicked 12 goals for 96 points. He was the equal leading try scorer in the 1933 season and second in 1934. He was 37 at the time of his death and buried at the Salerno War Cemetery in Italy. At the time of his enlistment he had been living in Ponsonby in Auckland. Turei was survived by his wife, Maud Kathleen Turei.

=== William Edward Leo (Billy) Dervan ===
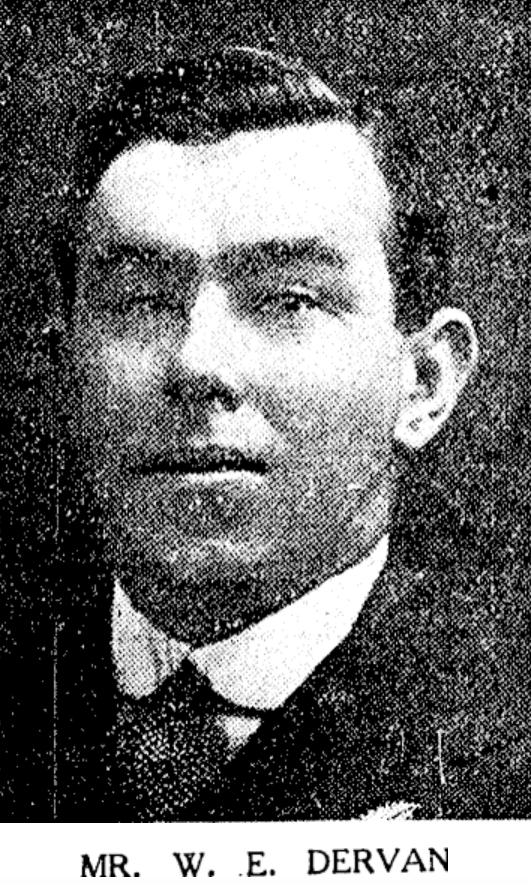

On April 18 William Edward Leo (Billy) Dervan died at the age of 60 at his residence at 4 St. Stephen's Avenue, Parnell. He was Kiwi #72, representing New Zealand 4 times on their 1912 tour of Australia. Dervan was educated at the Marist Brothers' School in Pitt Street. He originally played rugby for Marist Brothers' Old Boys Club, then the City club before switching to rugby league in 1912 where he played in the forwards. He played 4 matches for Newton Rangers in the same season, scoring 5 tries and kicking 4 goals. He retired at the end of the season but served on the Newton committee in 1913. He was heavily involved in boxing and was the official announcer for the Auckland Boxing Association for over 20 years, and took an interest in several other sports such as swimming, wrestling, and cricket. Dervan also volunteered at the New Zealand Institute for the Blind where he "read to the inmates [and] kept them fully acquainted with topics of the day".

=== (George) G. Grey Campbell ===
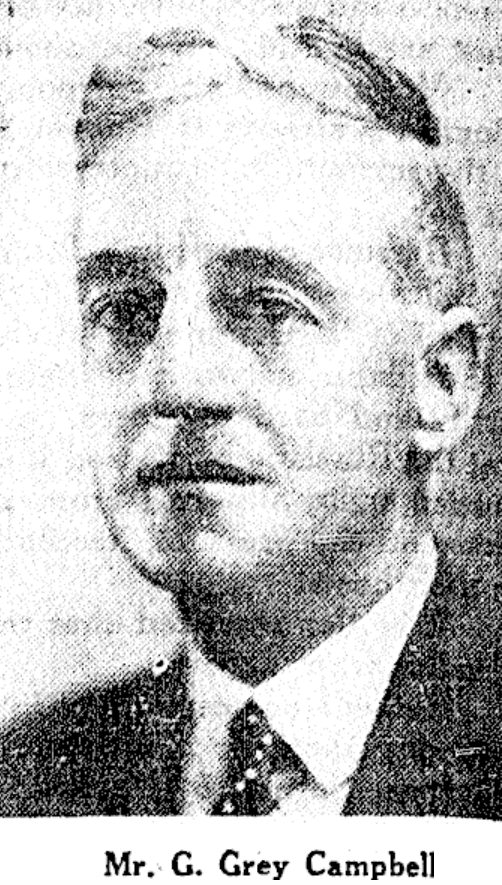

On April 23 Mr. (George) G. Grey Campbell died at Green Lane Hospital after a three-month battle with illness aged 57. Campbell had been chairman of Auckland Rugby League from 1933 to 1942 and was president for the past two. He was born in Ponsonby on October 7, 1886, and was educated at Ponsonby and Parnell schools. After the First World War he entered a partnership with Mr. J. Victor Macky and established the accounting firm Macky and Campbell. Campbell became a member of the New Zealand Society of Accountants and was a past-president of the Public Accountant's Association. Campbell held several other prominent positions during his working life, and in 1929 was elected to the Auckland City Council, topping the poll for the 1931 elections. Some of the positions he held included being a board member of the Auckland Transport Board, the Auckland Urban Land Sales Committee, and the Auckland University College Council where he represented the government for 8 years. Campbell was responsible after the outbreak of the war for organising many concert parties to military camps around Auckland through the Auckland Community Singing Committee. He also served on the Massey Agricultural College Council. At the time of his death he was also the vice-president of the Ponsonby Bowling Club. He was living at 38 Croydon Road, Mount Eden and was survived by his wife Elsie Ada and two daughters, Gwenyth and Elizabeth. His funeral was at the Beresford Street Congregational Church, where he was the superintendent of the Sunday school for many years, on April 25 at 2 pm. He was buried at Hillsborough Cemetery, Auckland.

=== Trevor Clifford Hosken ===
Trevor Clifford Hosken of Wiri, Manurewa was killed in action on April 22, 1944, in Iceland, Atlantic Ocean aged 23. His rank was Warrant Officer, in the Royal New Zealand Air Force, 1407 Meteorological Flight, RAF. He trained at the RCAF, 2 Wireless School in Calgary, Alberta, Canada and the RCAF, 3 Bombing and Gunnery School, MacDonald, Manitoba. He was educated at the Point Chevalier and Manurewa schools. Hosken played 36 seniors games for Papakura from 1939 to 1941 scoring 10 tries and kicking a conversion. He had debuted at the young age of 18. He joined the R.N.Z.A.F in January 1941 and left for Canada in September of the same year. Hosken was survived by his parents as their only son, Joseph Thomas Hosken, and Gladys Florence Louise Hosken (née Wilson) of Auckland. Hosken was buried at Reykjavik (Fossvogur) Cemetery, Iceland. He is memorialised at the Auckland War Memorial Museum, WW2 Hall of Memories.

=== Thomas Edwin Avery ===
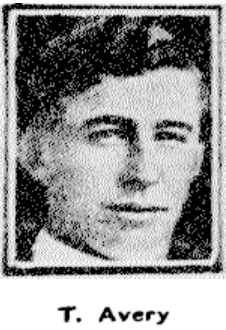
Tom Avery

Thomas Edwin Avery died on June 13 aged 60. Avery was born on July 11, 1883. He had played for the City Rovers club 36 times from 1910 to 1914 scoring 2 tries. He also made 4 appearances for Auckland from 1910 to 1913. His debut appearance was against Whanganui on September 22 in a 15–14 win at Cooks Garden, while he also played in Auckland's 24–13 win over Nelson at Trafalgar Park in Nelson. He played again against the Combined Goldfields and Thames side in Thames on May 18, 1912, before his final representative match was in an exhibition match for Auckland against the North Shore side on August 16, 1913, at Pukekohe. After retirement he spent time on the City Rovers committee and later became a referee. In 1919 the Maritime Club which he had joined post war as a player nominated him to receive the New Zealand Rugby League's medallion of life membership which was approved. He played 11 senior games for them in the 1918-19 seasons. The Auckland Rugby League paid their respects to him at their board meeting on June 14 and sent a letter of condolence to his family.

== Fox Memorial Shield (senior grade championship) ==
=== Preliminary rounds ===
==== Round 1 ====
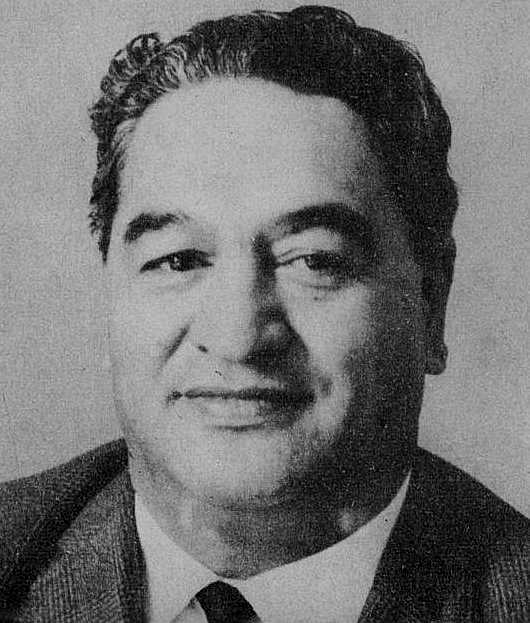
Puti Tipene Watene, Newton coach

Newton Rangers were being coached by Puti Tipene Watene. Moana Herewini was the coach of the Point Chevalier side. They had a good win over Otahuhu 15-11 with tries being scored by D Walker, Kirby, Len Davies, and Pope with Davies converting 2 and Pope 1. There was some controversy as W.L. Werohia played for Manukau despite having signed on from the South Auckland league with the Newton club. He appeared before the board of control midweek stating that he had thought that his uncle Pita Ririnui would be playing with Newton and later found out that he would play with Manukau, and he wished to now play there instead. He was later given permission to play for Manukau. He scored 4 tries in their win with lock George Shilton scoring 2. Tommy Chase converted 5 and added a penalty goal. For Newton, T Kani scored a try on the wing and T Shaw kicked four goals from full back. There was no individual scoring reported from the match at Grey Lynn Park between Richmond and Marist.

15 April	Point Chevalier	15-11	Otahuhu	Carlaw Park 1
1:30	Try: D Walker, Kirby, Len Davies, Pope; Con: Len Davies 2, Pope		Try: Ray Halsey, J Speedy, Roberts; Con: Colin Riley	Referee: S Pearson

15 April	Ponsonby	13-10	Mount Albert	Carlaw Park 1
3:00	Try: Darcy Bailey, C "Dooley" Moore, Clement; Con: James Morrell 2		Try: Les Clement, Moore; Con: Basil Cranch 2	Referee: H Tate

15 April	City	10-3	North Shore	Carlaw Park 2
1:30	Try: Jimmy Matthews, George Bodman; Pen: Ellis 2		Try: Hiscock	Referee: George Kelly

15 April	Manukau	31-11	Newton	Carlaw Park 2
3:00	Try: W.L. Werohia 4, George Shilton 2, Wiremu Te Tai, Ralph Martin, Aubrey Thompson; Con: Tommy Chase 5 Pen: Tommy Chase		Try: T Kani; Pen: T Shaw 4	Referee: Stuart Billman

15 April	Richmond	21-10	Marist	Grey Lynn Park
3:00				Referee: R Rowland

==== Round 2 ====
Robert Grotte the City back.

Before the matches at Carlaw Park the teams stood in silence to remember former Kiwi and Newton Rangers player Billy Dervan who had died. The "principal match" was between Ponsonby and Richmond, with the former side winning 13-8 after the scores were tied at 5-5 at half time. Roy Nurse played on the wing for Ponsonby and played well, as did Des Williams at halfback as did Bob Grotte who scored 2 tries. In the Ponsonby forwards Dick Hull, Raymond Lohenet, and O Hadley "were prominent". The newly introduced side, Point Chevalier put in a surprisingly strong effort against Mount Albert United, only losing 21-18. As a result it was decided by Auckland Rugby League to include them in the championship competition. For Point Chevalier tries were scored by Kirby, Harris, and Humphries (2), while Humphries also converted a try, with Rich also converting two. For Mount Albert 6 different players scored tries with Ivan Sumich gaining 1 of them and converting 2. The experienced half Les Clement was one of their scorers.

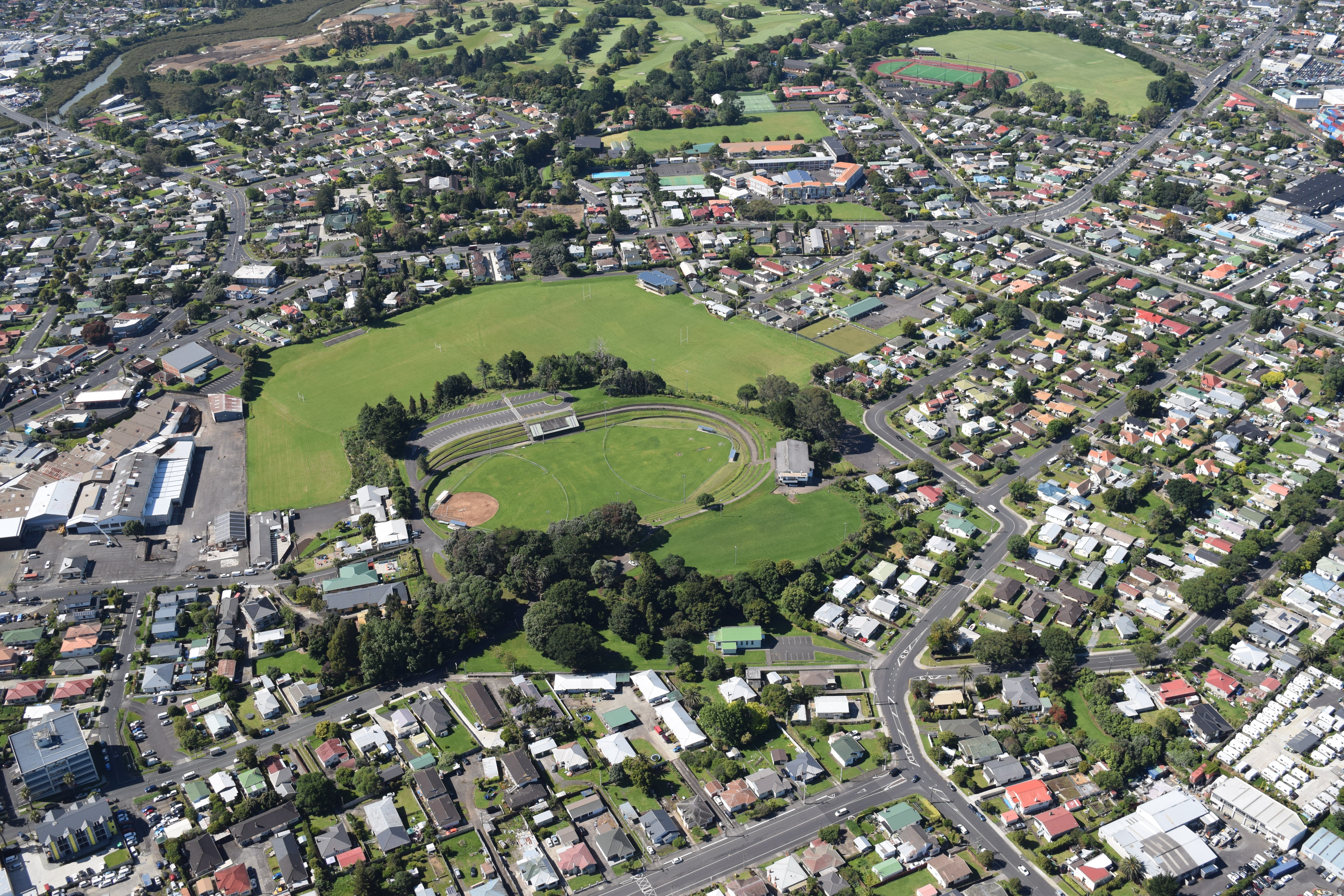
Sturges Park in Otahuhu.

The match between Otahuhu and Manukau was played at Sturges Park in Otahuhu and saw a surprising 22-10 win to the home side against a strong Manukau team. For Otahuhu, back, Cliff Wellm scored 4 tries while Colin Riley converted 3 of them and added 2 penalties. For Manukau, loose forward George Shilton scored both of their tries which were converted by the veteran representative player Tommy Chase.

22 April	Mount Albert	21-18	Point Chevalier	Carlaw Park 1
1:30	Try: A Jones, McKinnon, H.R. Gee, Laurent, Ivan Sumich, Les Clement; Con: Ivan Sumich 2		Try: Humphries 2, Kirby, Harris; Con: Humphries, Rich 2	Referee: Pat Meehan

22 April	Ponsonby	13-8 (5-5)	Richmond	Carlaw Park 1
3:00	Try: Robert Grotte 2, James Brassey; Con: Boyd, James Morrell		Try: Bernard Lowther 2 Con: Jack Magill	Referee: R Rowlands

22 April	North Shore	8-7	Newton	Carlaw Park 2
1:30	Try: Humphries, Taylor; Con: J McArthur		Try: H Brady; Pen: T Shaw 2	Referee: H Payne

22 April	City	20-5	Marist	Carlaw Park 2
3:00	Try: Miller, Fred James, George Bodman, James Matthews; Con: Warwick Clarke 2 Pen: Warwick Clarke 2		Try: Shepherd; Pen: Morrie Brockliss	Referee: A Pope

22 April	Otahuhu	22-10	Manukau	Sturges Park, Otahuhu
3:00	Try: Cliff Wellm 4 Con: Colin Riley 3 Pen: Colin Riley 2		Try: George Shilton 2 Con: Tommy Chase 2	Referee: George Kelly

=== Fox Memorial standings ===
Team	Pld	W	D	L	F	A	Pts
City Rovers	19	14	0	5	237	139	28
Mount Albert United	19	11	4	4	190	158	26
Manukau	18	11	2	5	194	119	24
Marist Old Boys	18	10	2	6	204	114	22
Ponsonby United	18	10	2	6	158	155	22
Richmond Rovers	18	10	0	8	242	153	20
Otahuhu Rovers	18	10	0	8	222	159	20
North Shore Albions	18	5	2	11	158	207	12
Point Chevalier	17	2	0	15	148	329	4
Newton Rangers	17	1	0	16	78	298	2

=== Fox Memorial results ===
==== Round 1 ====
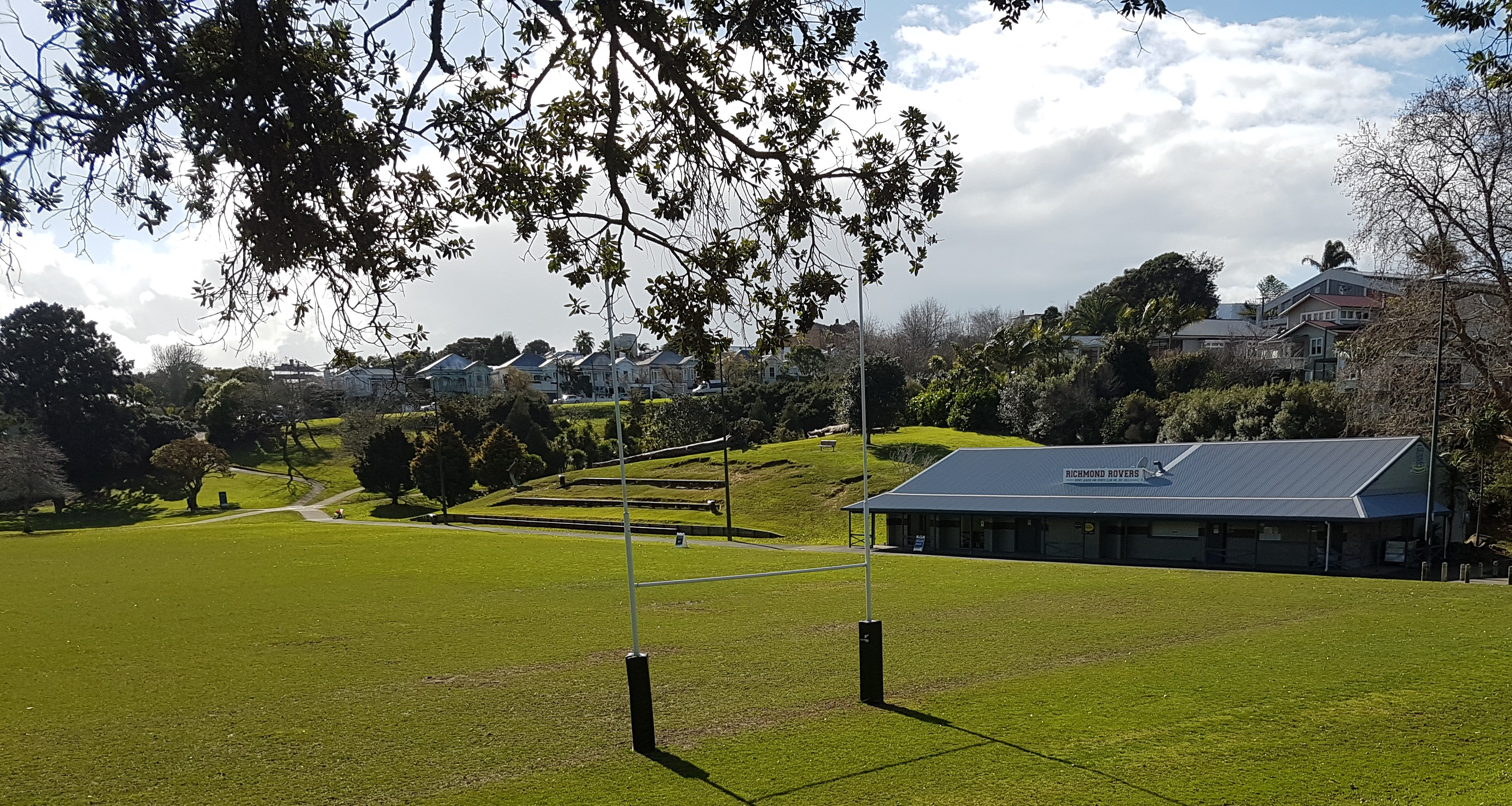
Grey Lynn Park, where the Marist - Newton match was played.

Prior to the commencement of the main matches at Carlaw Park all 4 teams lined up and stood in silence for one minute after Mr. J.W. Watson "referred feelingly to the recent death of Mr. George Grey Campbell", the former chairman and president of Auckland Rugby League who had died recently. Point Chevalier played in their first ever match in the first grade championship and were easily defeated by Richmond 45–14. Richmond were able to field their very strong back line from the previous season. C. Williams gave "good scrum service" while McDonald and Harkins showed a sharp combined thrust in the five eighth line, and Ron McGregor in the centre displaying great pace and ability to make the play for his wings, Kinney and Lowther, a speedy and resourceful pair". The first try scorer for Point Chevalier was Croad while Dormer kicked their first points with a penalty and he ended with 8 points from 4 successful kicks. For Richmond, Bernard Lowther scored 3 tries as did forward Leo Davis. The games were played in heavy rain which made the ground heavy. Don McLeod was carried off the field near the end of the match with a knee injury. Owen Hughes played for Otahuhu as player/coach in the hooker position after transferring from City. He "with clever hooking, got Otahuhu a good share of the ball from set scrums, a success that was assisted by the right kind of weight support from the other Otahuhu forwards when it was needed which included Norm Johnson. In the five eighths for Otahuhu were Colin Riley and Cliff Wellm who "showed dash, and their speed from set scrums paved the way for two fine tries". R. Keat at centre "created a good impression" and Ray Halsey "ran with determination, but did not get many real scoring chances". The "5th" game was played between Marist and Newton at Grey Lynn Park and saw Marist win 30-5. Iain Te Weti on the wing for Marist scored 2 tries as did Ivan Simpson "on a muddy ground". Dave McWilliams in the five eighths with White and Hughes outside him played well. Other players to score for Marist were Gerry Hughes and Lindsay Simons, with Morrie Brockliss converting 3 and Dave McWilliams 2 to go with a penalty. Don McLeod took "the eye" for the Marist side but had to be carried off the field with a knee injury. Both fullbacks gave "a sound display of line kicking, and the more experienced T. Shaw playing a cool game. Shaw had moved to Auckland the previous season after representing South Auckland (Waikato). In the Otahuhu v Ponsinby game the former side paired Colin Riley and Cliff Wellm in the five eighths and they were "conspicuous in their speed and dash". In the centre "R. Keat" showed great skill at working in a narrow compass...".

29 April	Richmond	45-14	Point Chevalier	Carlaw Park 1
1:30	Try: Bernard Lowther 3, Leo Davis 3, Harkins, Dowling, R Seymour, Potter, William Kinney; Con: R Seymour, J McDonald 3, Jack Magill; Pen: J McDonald		Try: E Croad, Moffett; Con: Wilfred Dormer; Pen: Wilfred Dormer 3	Referee: George Kelly

29 April	Otahuhu	21-6	Ponsonby	Carlaw Park 1
3:00	Try: Cliff Wellm, Sanderson, Norm Johnson, R Keat, Ray Halsey; Con: Colin Riley 2, C Allen		Try: Hermes Hadley, Raymond Lohenet	Referee: Stuart Billman

29 April	North Shore	18-7	Manukau	Carlaw Park 2
1:30	Try: Bruce Graham 2, Hiscocks, McNeil; Con: J McArthur 2, Jack Laing		Try: Tom Butler; Con: Tommy Chase; Pen: Tommy Chase	Referee: Emmet Pope

29 April	City	9-5	Mount Albert	Carlaw Park 2
3:00	Try: Fred James; Pen: Warwick Clarke 3		Try: Moore; Pen: Basil Cranch	Referee: Jack Hawkes

29 April	Marist	30-5	Newton	Grey Lynn Park
3:00	Try: Iain Te Weri 2, Ivan Simpson 2, Gerry Hughes, Lindsay Simons; Con: Morrie Brockliss 3, Dave McWilliams 2 Pen: Dave McWilliams		Try: Hugh Brady; Pen: T Shaw	Referee: H Tate

==== Round 2 ====
North Shore were playing their 400th first grade match when they took on Ponsonby at the Devonport Domain though it is unlikely they were aware of this fact. They became the fourth club to achieve this feat behind fellow foundation clubs City Rovers, Ponsonby, and Newton. After they lost to Ponsonby 8-0 their all-time record to this point was played 400, won 206, drawn 26, lost 168. Future New Zealand international, Bruce Graham stood out for North Shore while Dick Hull and MacDonald did the same for Ponsonby and Travers Hardwick, another future New Zealand international scored his first ever try. In the backs Gamble and Cave "did good work for North Shore, while in the Ponsonby backs Des Williams "was prominent" as were Roy Nurse and J Rapana. Jimmy Matthews returned from the Middle East where he had been serving in the armed forces and played for City having previously played for Marist from 1938 to 1940. He scored a "spectacular try" in their win over Richmond. Bert Leatherbarrow was also now playing for City after transferring from Mount Albert near the conclusion of the 1943 season. City fielded a strong pack which also included international front rower Hawea Mataira and the experienced Wirepa Jackson, George Bodman, Eugene Donovan, and Fred James who was "a tall and speedy player who does valuable work in the loose". Future All Black, Johnny Simpson scored a hat trick of tries in Marist's 51-10 win over Point Chevalier. His brother, Ivan had scored for Marist the previous week and added another try in the win over Point Chevalier. Arthur Shepherd scored twice as did Gordon Crocker, while five eighths Dave McWilliams also scored two tries and added 5 conversions. Otahuhu had a narrow 3-0 win over Manukau with John Speedy, their halfback scoring the only points of the match following a 60 yard run "amid great excitement". Otahuhu were advantaged by having the experienced Owen Hughes at hooker securing a lot of the ball for them. He had played over a decade for City seniors from 1933 to 1943 and was now the player coach of the Otahuhu side.

6 May	Otahuhu	3-0	Manukau	Carlaw Park 1
1:30	Try: John Speedy			Referee: Stuart Billman

6 May	City	9-7 (2-2)	Richmond	Carlaw Park 1
3:00	Try: Jimmy Matthews; Con: Warwick Clarke; Pen: Alan Donovan 2		Try: C.W. Williams; Con: J McDonald; Pen: Jack Magill	Referee: George Kelly

6 May	Marist	51-10	Point Chevalier	Carlaw Park 2
1:30	Try: Johnny Simpson 3, Dave McWilliams 2, Gordon Crocker 2, Arthur Shepherd 2, Don McLeod, Morrie Brockliss, Ashley Best, Ivan Simpson; Con: Dave McWilliams 5, Ashley Best		Try: Humphries, D Walker; Con: Humphries; Pen: Wilfred Dormer	Referee: Emmet Pope

6 May	Mount Albert	10-8	Newton	Carlaw Park 2
3:00	Try: Jack Zane-Zaninovich 2 Con: Basil Cranch; Pen: Basil Cranch		Try: Hugh Brady, T Shaw; Con: T Shaw	Referee: H Tate

6 May	North Shore	0-8	Ponsonby	Devonport Domain
3:00			Try: Dick Hull, Travers Hardwick; Pen: R Fielder	Referee: Jack Hawkes

==== Round 3 ====
Oswald Lawrence Martin, aged 29 broke his leg while playing for Manukau against City at Carlaw Park in the main match. He was taken to Auckland Hospital as was Allan Thomas Vost, aged 23 who was concussed in the match at Walker Park between North Shore and Point Chevalier. Vost was playing for the North Shore side. Both were reported to be in "satisfactory" condition the following day. In Manukau's narrow 12-11 win over City M. Thompson scored 2 tries, while Tom Butler and Joe Murray scored one each. Murray's try was described as "brilliant" as he started and completed a fast movement which was "a feature of the first spell". They were unsuccessful with all their goal attempts. City scored three tries to Pouvi Salaia, Alan Donovan, and Eugene Donovan with Donovan adding a penalty. The City backs were criticised by the New Zealand Herald writer for standing "too deeply", "and their cover defence was too slow to check the Manukau inside backs". In an interesting resolution the Werohia transfer saw him move from Newton to Manukau, while Steve Watene went from Manukau to Newton. Watene was said to want to fill the role of player-coach for Newton, while Werohia wished to join his uncle Pita Ririnui at Manukau. The later was said to come from the Ngaruawahia District and was 19 years of age. He "showed... he is a dashing type of wing three-quarter, with a big turn of speed and a baffling swerve". In the same match Warwick Clarke, and Ralph Martin, the respective City and Manukau fullbacks were both seen in action and were regarded and the best fullbacks in Auckland. They "had every opportunity to show skill in positional play, and resort to the running game as chances came to get their backs into position. Both full-backs gave a clever exhibition of league tactical play". Manukau had also been strengthened by the inclusion of Charlie Morris at five eighth and Kenneth Finlayson at hooker. Finlayson "remedied a weakness evident in the Manukau team at the start of the season. His clean hooking got Manukau the ball from set scrums on occasions which really counted, despite the fact that his opposite was Bert Leatherbarrow, the New Zealand representative player". Early in the second half Manukau seemed to have City beaten but City rallied and excellent play by Hawea Mataira and Wiremu Jackson helped them fight back with a try to Eugene Donovan 3 minutes before the end getting them to within a point. Unfortunately for them Warwick Clarke missed the conversion and Manukau won. For Manukay Tom Butler "proved he is still the best winger in the code". While George Shilton, Pita Ririnui, and Wiremu Te Tai "were prominent among the forwards". The game between Richmond and Ponsonby which was won by Richmond 18-8 was said to be closer than the score suggested. It was an "open" game, with the Ponsonby backs at times gaining an advantage over the generally faster Richmond forwards. Most of Richmond's 4 tries came from the play of their talented centre three-quarter Ron McGregor. His "speed often opened up the necessary gap". The Richmond halfback, McDonald kicked 3 conversions from 4 attempts. For Ponsonby, D. Manley on the wing and Bagley at centre "were the most impressive" with Manley outpacing "several Richmond backs to score the best try of the game" while Bagely "did good work all round". For Otahuhu in their 31-7 win against Newton their five eighth, Colin Riley kicked 5 conversions from their 7 tries. At Walker Park in Point Chevalier the visiting North Shore side won 27 to 16. For the home team Dormer scored a try and kicked 5 goals to secure 13 of their 16 points, while for North Shore Jack Laing cored a try, a conversion, and a penalty, J. McArthur kicked 4 conversions and Cave scored twice. Laig "was responsible for some successful individualistic efforts", with "the whole Shore backline a delight to watch". Their veteran forward, Horace Hunt also scored a try. Hunt had debuted for North Shore 14 seasons earlier in 1931 and had also represented Auckland in cricket as a wicket keeper.

13 May	Manukau	12-11 (9-2)	City	Carlaw Park 1
3:00	Try: M Thompson 2, Tom Butler, Joe Murray		Try: Pouvi (Robert) Salaia, Alan Donovan, Eugene Donovan; Pen: Alan Donovan	Referee: Stuart Billman

13 May	Marist	9-9	Mount Albert	Carlaw Park 1
1:40	Try: Skinner; Pen: Morrie Brockliss 3		Try: Moore; Con: Basil Cranch; Pen: Basil Cranch	Referee: H Tate

13 May	Richmond	18-8	Ponsonby	Carlaw Park 2
3:00	Try: Frank Hilton, R Seymour, Bernard Lowther, Leo Davis; Con: J McDonald 3		Try: D Manley, Roy Nurse; Pen: James Morrell	Referee: Jack Hawkes

13 May	Otahuhu	31-7	Newton	Carlaw Park 2
1:30	Try: Jim Fogarty 2, Cliff Wellm 2, Peter McManus, Norm Johnson, Ray Halsey; Con: Colin Riley 5		Try: Owen Elliott; Pen: T Shaw 2	Referee: Emmett Pope

13 May	Point Chevalier	16-27	North Shore	Walker Park
3:00	Try: Andrews, Wilfred Dormer; Con: Wilfred Dormer; Pen: Wilfred Dormer 4		Try: Cave 2, Jack Laing 2, Horace Hunt; Con: Jack Laing, J McArthur 4 Pen: Jack Laing	Referee: George Kelly

==== Round 4 ====
In the early match on the number 1 field at Carlaw Park North Shore came back to beat Otahuhu 11-8 after trailing 5-8 at halftime. Shore fielded a heavy pack which included a lot of experience with Horace Hunt, Jock Rutherford, Thomas Field, Bruce Graham, and Mercer. Their advantage was particularly gained through Rutherford's hooking and Graham being able to keep up with the play in the loose. J Speedy at halfback for Otahuhu "opened his play with celerity" but his inside backs did not play well and the talented and experienced Ray Halsey on the wing received few opportunities. Manukau fielded Wiremu Te Tai, one of their outstanding forwards who was in his 5th season with the club in the centre three-quarter position. He weighed in at 14 stone but was said to have played a "serviceable game". For Ponsonby their only points came from a penalty to Rapana. D Manley, Edwin Kay, and William Benzie played in the halves with Benzie showing "the brilliance of youth" with his straight running. The match between Mount Albert and Point Chevalier was played on Mount Alberts home ground of Fowlds Park in Morningside. When they scored their last points of the match they passed the 2,000 point mark in the first grade competition. They became the 8th club to achieve the feat. The Mount Albert hooker Thomassen was outstanding with his hooking and his loose play. On the wing, the prolific scorer Basil Cranch kicked three goals but "lacked dash in positional play". At fullback Cyril Wiberg "was unimpressive at full back ... hos opposite number Rich, confirmed the earlier good impression he had made".City beat Marist 21 to 8 with winger B. Taylor scoring 3 tries. Fullback Warwick Clarke converted 3 of their 5 tries. The other 2 were scored by Pouvi Salaia and Fred James. For Marist their best back was Te Wiri who "made three fine dashes from half way". In Newton's loss to Richmond they fielded Hutchinson as pivot, formerly of City. In the inside positions Niwa and Kerr were "outstanding". Richmond was without Ron McGregor but Whittaker on the wing "impressed with speed and determination".

20 May	North Shore	11-8 (5-8)	Otahuhu	Carlaw Park 1
1:45	Try: Bruce Graham 2, J Greenwood; Con: J McArthur		Try: Ray Halsey, Jim Fogarty; Con: Colin Riley	Attendance: 7,500; Referee: Emmett Pope

20 May	Manukau	4-2	Ponsonby	Carlaw Park 1
3:00	Pen: Tom Butler 2		Pen: J Rapana	Attendance: 7,500; Referee: George Kelly

20 May	Richmond	12-5	Newton	Carlaw Park 2
1:45	Try: Potter, Whittaker; Con: McDonald, Jack Magill; Pen: Jack Magill		Try: Owen Elliott; Con: Roy Niwa	Attendance: 7,500; Referee: H Tate

20 May	City	21-13	Marist	Carlaw Park 2
3:00	Try: B Taylor 3, Pouvi (Robert) Salaia, Fred James; Con: Warwick Clarke 3		Try: W Rangi, Don McLeod, White; Con: Morrie Brockliss; Pen: Morrie Brockliss	Attendance: 7,500; Referee: Jack Hawkes

20 May	Mount Albert	18-16	Point Chevalier	Fowlds Park, Morningside
3:00	Try: Les Clement 2, Herbert Zane-Zaninovich, Moore; Con: Basil Cranch 2 Pen: Basil Cranch		Try: Humphries, Barnes; Con: Len Davies; Pen: Len Davies 2, Dormer 2	Referee: Stuart Billman

==== Round 5 ====
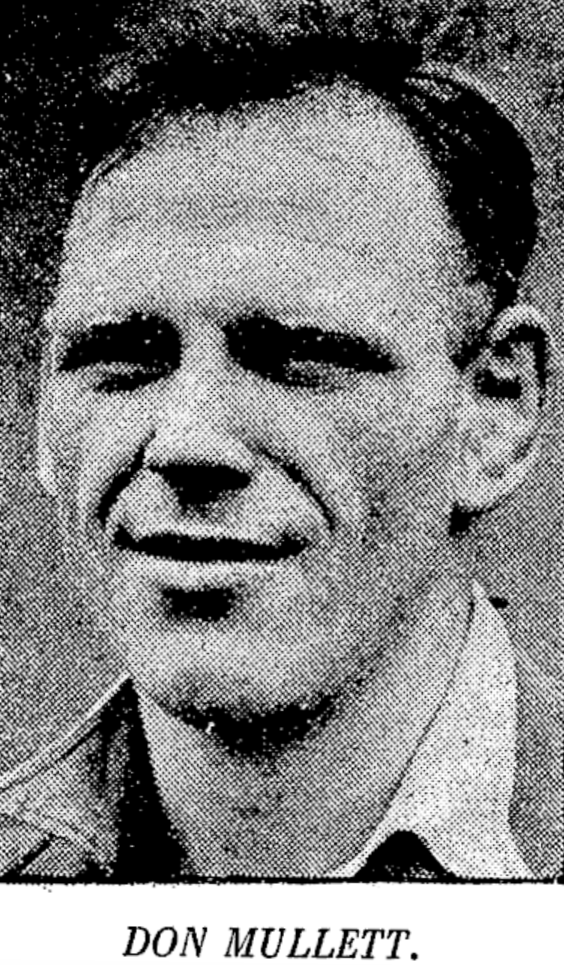
Don Mullett, the New Zealand Heavy Weight boxing champion who debuted for Ponsonby.

In the principal match Manukau beat Richmond on a heavy ground and for a time in heavy rain. Wiremu Te Tai, the 14 stone Manukau forward "was untroubled by a slippery ball, and the fact that the ground, in places was a quagmire". Rogers played well in their forwards also, while Aubrey Thompson and M. Thompson "showed up in the loose play, but the heavy weight Pita Ririnui found the going too much of a problem". In the Manukau backs Joe Murray and Jack Major showed "great defence". For Richmond, R. Seymour "played a great game, and made commendable efforts to open up the game for the Richmond backs" from the loose forward position. He was well supported by fellow forwards N. Dowling, T. Kipa, Frank Hilton, and Te Whanga, while Leo Davis was "outstanding". The two fullbacks, Ralph Martin (Manukau), and Jack Magill (Richmond) "were faultless in their fielding, and resolute in their defence". North Shore and Mount Albert drew 2-2 with Jack Laing and Jack Zane-Zaninovich kicking penalty goals for the respective teams. The teams were "well served by their half-backs, J. McArthur for North Shore and Les Clement for Mount Albert, yet, when the halfbacks did send the ball away the inside backs found safe handling of the ball almost impossible and the three-quarters had to fend for themselves". Near the end of the game the five eighths for Mount Albert, Jones, "made a couple of splendid efforts to cut a way through the North Shore inside backs. In one effort he made a great opening before sending on to Jack Zane-Zaninovich. The latter did his part well by drawing the Shore fullback, but Basil Cranch, with the way wide open, dropped the ball when the pass was given, and the last scoring chance that Mount Albert had" was lost.James (Jimmy) Chalmers, the former Marist senior player was in attendance at Carlaw Park. He had fought in the war and had a leg amputated as a result of injuries he received. He "was given a fine welcome by the patrons". Don Mullett, the New Zealand Heavyweight boxing champion made his first appearance for the Ponsonby side and caused quite a bit of interest. Marist lost to Otahuhu 8-6 with R.G. Kidd debuting for Marist in the forwards. He was a 16 stone forward who could goal kick and kicked "one nice penalty and when in condition promises to strengthen the forwards". In the three-quarters for Ponsonby, William Benzie and Darcy Bailey "did good service". While in the Point Chevalier forwards Pope "played a splendid game in the Point forwards". City were the only team to score in double digits in an easy 24-3 win over Newton at a heavy Grey Lynn Park field. Newton were missing two of their best players in T. Shaw (fullback), and N. McKay. The forward packs were similarly matched but the speed of the City backs was the difference. For City, Robert Salaia in the three-quarters and Warwick Clarke at fullback were "outstanding". Salaia "made the openings for at least three of City's half dozen tries, and Clarke played a great game, his run through the Newton team to score being the highlight of the match".

27 May	Manukau	2-0	Richmond	Carlaw Park 1
3:00	Pen: Tom Butler			Referee: Stuart Billman

27 May	North Shore	2-2	Mount Albert	Carlaw Park 1
1:45	Pen: Jack Laing		Pen: Jack Zane-Zaninovich	Referee: Jack Donovan

27 May	Otahuhu	8-6	Marist	Carlaw Park 2
3:00	Try: R Keat, J Speedy; Pen: Colin Riley		Pen: Morrie Brockliss 2, R.G. Kidd	Referee: George Kelly

27 May	Ponsonby	8-7	Point Chevalier	Carlaw Park 2
1:45	Try: William Benzie, Hermes Hadley; Pen: Darcy Bailey		Try: Pope; Con: Alfred Dormer; Pen: Alfred Dormer	Referee: H Tate

27 May	City	24-3	Newton	Grey Lynn Park
3:00	Try: Turnbell 2, Bert Leatherbarrow, Jimmy Matthews, Warwick Clarke, Ellis; Con: Alan Donovan 3		Try: Winiard	Referee: E Pope

==== Round 6 ====
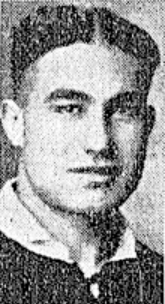
Hawea Mataira was still in outstanding form for City despite being in the later stages of his career.

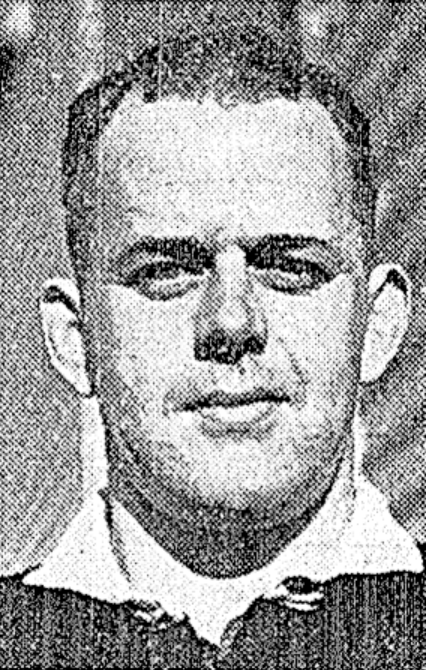
Bert Leatherbarrow was still in good hooking form for City in his 14th season of seniors. he had debuted for North Shore in 1931 and also played for Ponsonby and Mt Albert prior to joining City in 1943.

The round 6 matches were played in rain on heavy fields. In the early game on Carlaw Park #1 Marist beat Richmond by 2 points to 0. The only points came from the boot of Morrie Brockliss for Marist. They kicked poorly, missing several penalty kicks from close to the posts and could have won by more. Brockliss was not in good form and after missed attempts they tried three other kickers without success. Brockliss also "gave a good exhibition of positional play". For Richmond their fullback, Jack Magill "was also at his best" though was injured in the second half and went off before later being able to come back on. In the main match of the day two of the best sets of forwards in the competition met with City beating North Shore 15 to 11. City were led by veteran international forward Hawea Mataira who was still regarded as "one of the great forwards of the game". Both teams had very good specialist hookers, Bert Leatherbarrow for City was now in his 14th season of senior grade rugby league and had represented New Zealand on their aborted 1939 tour of England while playing 10 games for Auckland from 1932 to 1941. For North Shore, Jock (John) Rutherford was their hooker and in his 5th season with them. In the North Shore pack, Horace Hunt, Tom Field, and Bruce Graham were "tireless workers to the end of a hard game" and Jack Laing and Humphries "performed well". Towards the end Rutherford scored a try between the posts to make the score 12-11 to City, but City finished strongly and B Taylor scored from a passing bout. Pouvi (Robert) Salaia, centre three-quarter was "the pick of the City backs". Turnbill played well at five eighths, and Alan Donovan at halfback "controlled the play well". In the City forward Wirepa Jackson, Eugene Donovan, and George Bodman showed "excellent play in the loose". Otahuhu had an easy win over Point Chevalier by 29 points to 3. Their forwards gave "easily the best display of team work seen this season" according to the Auckland Star. Mick Johnson scored three of their tries and "was in every movement", while fellow forward Jim Fogarty "played a fine game in the loose and was always up with passing bouts", and hooker Owen Hughes "was prominent in the loose". Barnes scored the only points for Point Chevalier. Manukau thrashed Newton 34-0 with M Thompson, the Manukau loose forward scoring a remarkable 5 tries, while his fellow loose forward Wiremu Te Tai crossed for 2 himself. The team handled the ball "very cleanly and there was an entire absence of kicking when a pass was wanted". Rogers, who usually played in the forwards was moved to centre three-quarter for the second time this season where he "played a clever game ... and was the outstanding back". Ray Martin the brother of Ralph Martin, their star fullback debuted and did well at five eighths. At the Devonport Domain, Mount Albert had a close 5-2 win over Ponsonby. Ponsonby were missing back, Darcy Bailey, and forward Dick Hull who were both likely to be out for weeks with injuries but still managed to dominate the second half and were considered unlucky to lose. Travers Hardwick "was prominent among those present for Ponsonby. Their third grade recruit, William Benzie played a "good game", and Des Williams at half back and Roy Nurse on the wing showed "more dash than their opposites. For Mount Albert, McKinnon "was prominent in the forwards" and Jones "was one of the most impressive backs". Near the end of the game "it appeared that obstruction prevented a certain try for Ponsonby".

3 June	Marist	2-0	Richmond	Carlaw Park 1
1:45	Pen: Morrie Brockliss			Referee: P Bailey

3 June	City	15-11	North Shore	Carlaw Park 1
3:10	Try: James Matthews, Pouvi (Robert) Salaia, B Taylor; Con: Alan Donovan 2 Pen: Alan Donovan		Try: Bruce Graham, Jack Laing, John Rutherford; Con: J McArthur	Referee: H Tate

3 June	Otahuhu	29-3	Point Chevalier	Carlaw Park 2
1:45	Try: Mick Johnson 3, Ray Halsey 2, K Simons, J Speedy; Con: Colin Riley 3 Pen: Colin Riley		Try: Barnes	Referee: Jack Donovan

3 June	Manukau	34-0	Newton	Carlaw Park 2
3:10	Try: M Thompson 5, Wiremu Te Tai 2, W.L. Werohia, Tom Butler, George Shilton; Con: Tom Butler 2			Referee: Jack Hawkes

3 June	Mount Albert	5-2	Ponsonby	Devonport Domain
3:00	Try: McKinnon; Con: Basil Cranch		Pen: Roy Nurse	Referee: Stuart Billman

==== Round 7 ====
Once again the matches were played on heavy grounds. In the early game on the #1 field at Carlaw Park Mount Albert beat Otahuhu 13-10 after leading 13-2 at halftime. The teams were well matched in the forwards but the Mount Albert backs "were superior". John Speedy "gave splendid scrum service for Otahuhu, that was in keeping with his reputation of being one of the best halves in the code" but Cliff Wellm in the five eighths "was uncertain at handling the ball" and they missed Keat at centre so Ray Halsey and K Simons on the wings "were starved for opportunities". The Mount Albert five eights, Ivan Sumich and A. Jones "worked smoothly, and Basil Cranch played an outstanding game in the three quarter line". In the main game Marist and Manukau drew 5-5. Marist had led 5-0 through a penalty to Morrie Brockliss and a try to H. Te Wiri who "raced through to score", but Tom Butler scored a late try which he converted from the sideline to share the match. it was brilliant play from Joe Murray, Rogers, and M Thompson which led to the try. Earlier they should have scored when "Butler beat the defence, but Werohia dropped Rogers pass". Marist could have won the match but missed four penalty attempts at goal including one which hit the post. The Marist forwards "held their own against the Manukau six, and the five eighths, [Jimmy] White, and [Gerry] Hughes, with unwavering defence, cramped the attacking play of the Manukau inside backs" though the New Zealand Herald criticised them for their attack saying they "passed across-field instead of varying their attacks". The outstanding Marist forward was said to be veteran Lindsay Simons who "occasionally also played the extra back game". On the #2 field in the late match Richmond beat North Shore 28-10 though the match was said to be closer than the score suggested. Richmond were praised by the Auckland Star for "a high class display of the passing game" in scoring 8 tries. North Shore were unfortunate in losing Cave to injury after he had earlier scored a try. Richmond's halfback, C.W. Williams was the best back on the ground and his "variety of methods from the scrum base paved the way for tries. His judicious use of the stab kick placed the fast Richmond backs quickly on attack". Ron McGregor at centre "made nice openings, and gave [Bernard] Lowther one really good try". The North Shore forwards "more than held their own against the Richmond set, and in the loose [Horace] Hunt, [Bruce] Graham, and [Tom] Field worked hard to avert defeat". Of their backs Jack Laing was the pick, "doing excellent work both on attack and in defence". The 5th match of the round was played at Walker Park, the home ground of Point Chevalier. They were defeated by City 18 points to 10 but made a close thing of it and led 10-5 at halftime. The played was described as "rather ragged" early in the match. Point Chevaliers forwards Wells, and Cecil Blincoe were said to be responsible for their halftime lead. In their backs A.W. Pope "was the hardest worker on the field". For City, Alan Donovan was heavily involved in their back play, while Hawea Mataira "was to the front in the forward attacks". Point Chevalier crossed the City try line twice in the second half but both tries were disallowed through forward passes. City's win and Otahuhu's loss meant that City took the lead in the championship.

10 June	Mount Albert	13-10 (13-2)	Otahuhu	Carlaw Park 1
1:45	Try: Ivan Sumich, Jack Zane-Zaninovich, Basil Cranch; Con: Basil Cranch		Try: Ray Halsey, A Thompson; Con: Colin Riley; Pen: Colin Riley	Referee: George Kelly

10 June	Ponsonby	13-2	Newton	Carlaw Park 2
1:45	Try: William Thomas, D Manley, Roy Nurse; Con: J Rapana; Pen: J Rapana		Pen: Roy Niwa	Referee: Jack Hawkes

10 June	Manukau	5-5 (0-2)	Marist	Carlaw Park 1
3:10	Try: Tom Butler; Con: Tom Butler		Try: H Te Weri; Pen: Morrie Brockliss	Referee: Jack Donovan

10 June	Richmond	28-10	North Shore	Carlaw Park 2
3:10	Try: J McDonald, Frank Hilton, Bernard Lowther, Bradley, Leo Davis, Jack Magill, Potter, Ron McGregor; Con: J McDonald 2		Try: Cave, J McArthur; Con: Jack Laing 2	Referee: Emmet Pope

10 June	Point Chevalier	10-18 (10-5)	City	Walker Park
3:10	Try: Humphries 2 Con: Alfred Dormer; Pen: Alfred Dormer		Try: Eugene Donovan, Fred James, Alan Donovan, B Taylor; Con: Alan Donovan; Pen: Alan Donovan, Warwick Clarke	Referee: H Tate

==== Round 8 ====
In the early match on the #1 field at Carlaw Park Manukau beat Mount Albert 10-2 after trailing 0-2 at half time. Manukau were said to have shown "some good flashes of concerted effort in the second half, and got two converted tries". One of them came when "the Mount Albert defence was completely broken and the Manukau fullback Ralph Martin, joined in a passing movement which carried play to the right wing when the attack was reversed, Martin took a pass well, made ground, and sent the ball on. It went from hand to hand until Murray ran in to score between the posts". Butler was named as the "outstanding back" for Manukau, while Joe Murray and Ralph Martin "stood out for excellent defence". Point Chevalier recorded their first ever win in the Fox Memorial first grade competition when they defeated Newton 9–7 on Carlaw Park #2 field in the early kickoff. Owen Elliott of Newton had to leave the field in the first half with an ankle injury. Richmond played in their 300th first grade match against Otahuhu though it is unlikely they were aware of this fact. Following their win they had an all-time record of 300 played, 143 wins, 10 draws, and 147 losses. The only try in the match came when Ron McGregor at centre "intercepted a pass and made a clean break through. Coming to Mullins the Otahuhu fullback, he feinted to take the inside track, and then with a change of pace went outside. Once clear, McGregor ran to score as he liked. Despite being beaten by McGregor, Mullins "played a splendid game at full back for Otahuhu" and Jack Magill the Richmond fullback "also giving a clever display". Peter McManus was injured for Otahuhu early in the second half forcing them to play a player short thereafter. Point Chevalier recorded their first ever championship win against Newton by 9 points to 7. Their forward, Croad scored a try and "played a fine game in the loose" with Cecil Blincoe also being noticed for "following the ball in keen anticipation" during the game. and Alfred Dormer kicked 3 penalties. Newton were unlucky in losing Owen Elliott early in the first half to injury after he had kicked "a fine penalty goal" and then lost Maurice Quirke, their hooker. Other forwards in the Newton side who were prominent were Gallagher and Te Haara. Godfrey Sorby scored their only try with Elliot kicking a penalty and R. Duncan also kicking a penalty. The match between Marist and North Shore was played at the Ellerslie Domain. The Ellerslie League Football Club was given permission by the Ellerslie Domain Board to "demand a fee for admission to the domain, not in any case to exceed 6d per person". In the late match on the number 2 field 2 players who stood out were Hawea Mataira and Wirepa Jackson. the Auckland Star wrote that that are "perhaps the best forwards in this position seen for some years, and their form against Ponsonby on Saturday was good. Both were outstanding in the loose, and used their weight in support of the hooker. Leatherbarrow. Both Jackson and Mataira have strong claims for selection in the rep team to oppose West Coast on July 15". In their back line Alan Donovan "playing better at halfback than at five eighth, has given a greatly improved rear-division better opportunities. [Polouvi] Salaia, at centre, showed better anticipation against Ponsonby, giving the wings chances on attack". In a refereeing milestone, George Kelly refereed in approximately his 100th match involving first grade sides becoming the 4th referee to achieve this feat after Les Bull, Percy Rogers, and Stuart Billman.

17 June	Manukau	10-2 (0-2)	Mount Albert	Carlaw Park 1
1:45	Try: Joe Murray, Tom Butler; Con: Joe Murray, Tom Butler		Pen: Basil Cranch	Referee: Jack Donovan

17 June	Richmond	9-0 (7-0)	Otahuhu	Carlaw Park 1
3:10	Try: Ron McGregor; Con: J McDonald; Pen: J McDonald, C.W. Williams			Referee: George Kelly

17 June	Point Chevalier	9-7	Newton	Carlaw Park 2
1:45	Try: Croad; Pen: Alfred Dormer 3		Try: Godfrey Sorby; Pen: Owen Elliott, R Duncan	Referee: H Payne

17 June	City	24-6	Ponsonby	Carlaw Park 2
3:10	Try: Wirepa Jackson 2, Jimmy Matthews, Turnbill, Alan Donovan, Bert Leatherbarrow; Con: Alan Donovan 2 Pen: Alan Donovan		Try: Darcy Bailey 2	Referee: H Tate

17 June	Marist	8-0	North Shore	Ellerslie Domain
3:10	Try: Lindsay Simons, Maurice Costello; Con: Morrie Brockliss			Referee: Stuart Billman

==== Round 9 ====
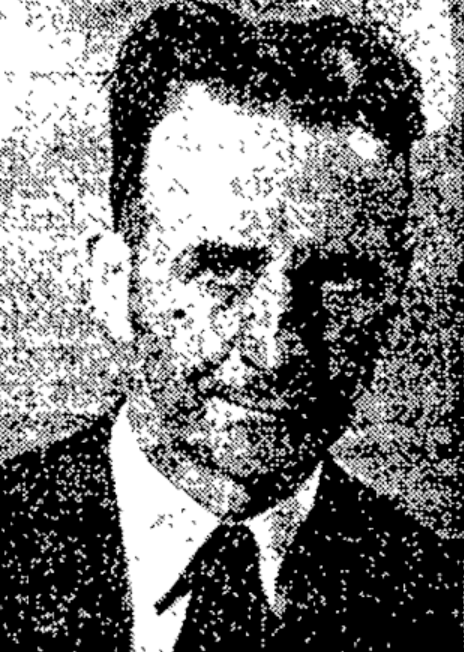
Referee, Stuart Billman

Stuart Billman refereed his 135th match involving first grade sides in Auckland club football which was more than any other referee had done when he officiated in the Otahuhu v City match. He had been a referee for 19 years and in the senior grade for 10. At the end of the season the Auckland Star wrote an article on Billman after he had been elected honorary secretary of the Auckland Centre of the New Zealand Amateur Athletic Association. Otahuhu caused a shock when they defeated the leaders City 15–10 in the main match on the number 1 field at Carlaw Park. Their forwards gave a "splendid exhibition of enduring play... and their mobility, speed and keen defensive work more than countered the work of the formidable City six in tight play". The most prominent amongst them were brothers Ivan Johnson, Mick Johnson, and Norm Johnson. With the star being Mick who "showed the right sort of determined finish by crossing the City try line on two occasions to score". They rearranged their backs for the match with Ray Halsey playing at centre instead of his usual wing position and he played "with distinction" and Colin Riley had moved from fullback to the five eighths and "doing well". Fogarty also moved from the forwards to backs for Otahuhu. Halfway through the first half J Speedy, the Otahuhu half back placed a cross kick to K Simons on the wing who scored. For City Pouvi Salaia and Jimmy Matthews were their best backs while Hawea Mataira and Fred James "were prominent among the forwards". In the earlier kickoff Mount Albert beat Richmond 13 to 6 with Ivan Sumich and Jones in the Mount Albert five eighths showing "smooth work and good understanding... they handled safely in attack, and in defence stopped the Richmond inside backs from breaking through". North Shore scored 7 tries in an easy 23-8 win over Newton. Bruch Graham scored 2, while B Taylor, Cave, R Humphries, Hiscocks, and J McArthur all crossed for one each, with Jack Laing kicking their only goal. In the late game on the #2 field Ponsonby beat Marist 11-8. The field was a "sea of mud". Usual Ponsonby forward, W. Briggs played at halfback and "gave the backs plenty of chances on attack". In the other direction, their back, Darcy Bailey was now playing loose forward and he "was always up with the play and showing more than average ability to handle. He is fast ad can beat the defence with a nice side-step. The fact that Bailey can play a good game at centre gives him strong claims for Auckland representative honours". In the Ponsonby forwards "Don Mullett played easily his best game since joining up with Ponsonby. Against Marist he was noticed leading the pack on numerous occasions and often on hand to take a pass from the backs". The last game was between Manukau and Point Chevalier at Grey Lynn Park. Manukau won 8 to 3 with tries to Joe Murray and A Rogers, with one converted by Tom Butler. Point Chevalier's only points came from a try to Humphries. Point Chevalier led 3-0 until the 50 minute mark on a muddy ground. The Manukau fullback Ralph Martin "played an outstanding game coming up on several occasions to combine with Rogers, Butlar and Werohia, the ball being thrown about sometimes in dry-weather style. Finlayson and Ewe were among the forwards who worked hard. For Point Chevalier, Rich "was reliable at fullback".

24 June	Mount Albert	13-6	Richmond	Carlaw Park 1
1:45	Try: Jack Zane-Zaninovich, Basil Cranch, Les Clement; Pen: Basil Cranch 2		Try: Ron McGregor, Aubrey Thompson	Referee: Jack Hawkes

24 June	Otahuhu	15-10 (7-5)	City	Carlaw Park 1
3:00	Try: Mick Johnson 2, K Simons; Con: Colin Riley 2 Pen: Colin Riley		Try: Fred James, Pouvi (Robert) Salaia; Con: Alan Donovan 2	Referee: Stuart Billman

24 June	North Shore	23-8	Newton	Carlaw Park 2
1:45	Try: Bruce Graham 2, B Taylor, Cave, J McArthur, R Humphries, Hiscocks; Con: Jack Laing		Try: Roy Niwa, Thomas Kerr; Con: Owen Elliott	Referee: Jack Donovan

24 June	Ponsonby	11-8	Marist	Carlaw Park 2
3:00	Try: James Brassey 2, Rex Nurse; Pen: Roy Nurse		Try: Don McLeod, White; Pen: Morrie Brockliss	Referee: H Tate

24 June	Manukau	8-3 (0-3)	Point Chevalier	Grey Lynn Park
3:00	Try: Rogers, Joe Murray; Con: Tom Butler		Try: Humphries	Referee: Emmet Pope

==== Round 10 ====
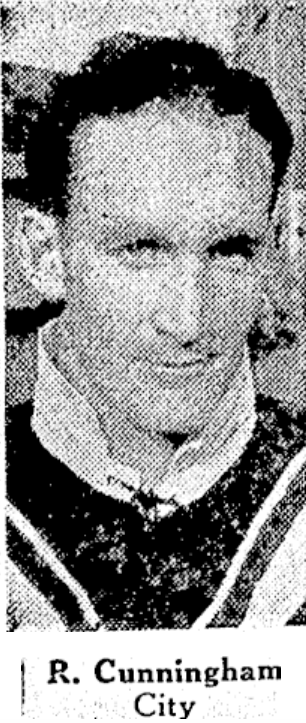
Rex Cunningham who debuted for City.

The second round of games were started once more on heavy grounds. Flags were flown at half mast at Carlaw Park after the death in a mining accident in Huntly of New Zealand international George Beadle. The early match at Carlaw Park saw Ponsonby score a first half try to winger James Brassey which turned out to be the only points of the match. Both forward packs played well with Ponsonby having "an outstanding trio in [Darcy] Bailey, [Dick] Hull, and [Don Mullett], the latter showing great speed in heavy going, and in loose play giving and exhibition of clever dribbling play". Travers Hardwick and Hermes Hadley also played "fine football". In the main match City defeated Mount Albert 8 points to 4 after leading 8-2 at the break. The respective fullbacks, Warwick Clarke (City), and Herbert Zane-Zaninovich (Mount Albert) were criticised for "indulging in too much kicking". Pouvi Salaia, the City centre was "the outstanding back" and his "hard straight running stamped him and the best centre-three quarter in the code". At half back, Alan Donovan "gave the five eighths plenty of chances but the best use of them was not made by Cossey and [Cunningham". The Cunningham named was Rex Cunningham who was most likely on debut after transferring from Pt Chevalier just over a week earlier. He went on to be selected for New Zealand and played for them 21 times including 4 tests. In the City forwards Hawea Mataira, Bert Leatherbarrow, and Ellis were their best. Mount Albert missed several shots at goal with Basil Cranch having an "off-day" and half back Les Clement also having a turn but only managed one success with "a number of shots from a handy range going astray". City scored the "best constructive try of the day [when] W. Cossey, the five eighth broke through a gap, and [Fred] James, a forward, with perfect backing up, was beside Cossey to take a pass and run in unopposed to score". On the #2 field Point Chevalier had an upset 6-3 win over Richmond, their first over that opponent in their history. The win "was hailed with enthusiasm" at the ground. The Point Chevalier forwards were credited with the win and "upset the usually smart Richmond backs". The usual fullback for Point Chevalier, Rich, played at five eighth and "excelled", standing out "as the best back on the ground. He made several clever openings and on one occasion went clean through the defence. He drop-kicked a goal from 40 yards out - a fine effort". At halfback, Alfred Dormer "worked the scrum well, and his short punt was ideal tactics on the day" while in the forwards Francis Goffin, Croad, Wells, and Barnes "were impressive in the loose". The match at a suburban ground was played at Devonport Domain between the home team, North Shore and Manukau. The match was close until halftime when Manukau only led 5-0 but they ran away with it in the second half winning 30-5. North Shore lost Hiscock to a facial injury during the first half and early in the second half Pritchard went off injured leaving them with 12 players and later finishing with just 10. In the second half Manukau played "football that delighted the crowd, the Manukau backs, with the Martin brothers [Ralph and Rex] and [Joe] Murray the most sound, piled up the points, and their final total of 30 would have been even greater had [Tom] Butler been in kicking form". For North Shore their forwards "toiled hard", especially Tom Field, Bruce Graham, and R Taylor.

1 July	Ponsonby	3-0 (3-0)	Otahuhu	Carlaw Park 1
1:45	Try: James Brassey			Referee: Emmet Pope

1 July	City	8-4 (8-2)	Mount Albert	Carlaw Park 1
3:00	Try: Jimmy Matthews, Fred James; Con: Alan Donovan		Pen: Les Clement, Basil Cranch	Referee: Jack Hawkes

1 July	Point Chevalier	6-3	Richmond	Carlaw Park 2
1:45	Pen: Alfred Dormer 2 Drop: Rich		Try: Bernard Lowther	Referee: C Knox

1 July	Marist	11-4	Newton	Carlaw Park 2
3:00	Try: Jimmy White 2, Don McLeod; Con: Morrie Brockliss		Pen: Roy Niwa 2	Referee: Stuart Billman

1 July	North Shore	5-30 (0-5)	Manukau	Devonport Domain
3:00	Try: Thomas Field; Con: Jack Laing		Try: E Opai 2, Joe Murray 2, Pita Ririnui, Ralph Martin, Jack Major, Reg Martin; Con: Ralph Martin, Reg Martin, Tom Butler	Referee: George Kelly

==== Round 11 ====
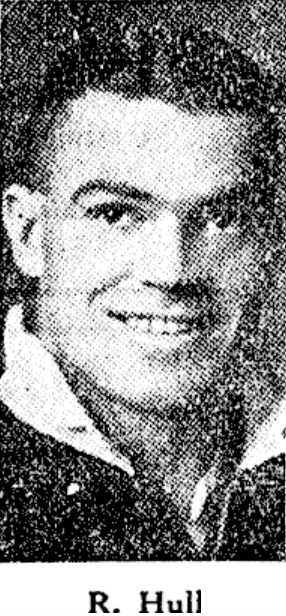
Dick Hull, the Ponsonby forward who was in great form.

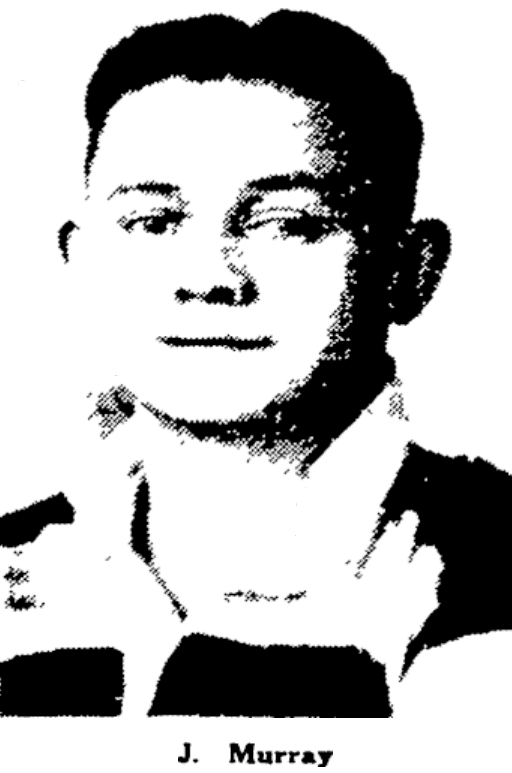
Joe Murray, the Manukau five eighths scored a brilliant try them which ultimately won the game against Otahuhu.

Former New Zealand international Arthur Kay came out of retirement to re-join his Ponsonby side. He kicked a conversion in their 11–4 win over North Shore and showed "good pivotal play" in the five eighths. In the Ponsonby forwards Darcy Bailey, Dick Hull, and Don Mullett "were outstanding". In the North Shore backs J. McArthur, Cave, and Jack Laing "gave convincing displays". N. Finlayson was ordered off for Manukau in their match with Otahuhu but they still won 5–4. Eugene Donovan the City loose forward was ordered off just 10 minutes into the game in their 13–12 loss to Richmond. He had made remarks to the referee, George Kelly. There were rumours in the following Saturday's newspapers that they may not take the field in protest at the send off and they ultimately turned out to be true. Otahuhu's point came from two penalty goals from Hugh Brady, the veteran player who had spent a decade with Newton. In the main match Manukau was considered lucky to beat Otahuhu 5 points to 4. Manukau's points came from a "brilliant effort by [Joe] Murray at five eighths" which was converted by Tom Butler. At the end of the game Jimmy Mullins had a penalty shot at goal for Otahuhu to win the game but "the ball went just wide of the posts". In the second half they had had several penalty kicks "at fairly close range" but chose to put up "up-and-under" kicks instead. Their forwards were also dominating and they went over the line in the second half with Mills appearing to touch down but the try was not awarded. J Speedy at halfback "varied his play well to enable the backs to keep up incessant attacks". City were upset by Richmond 13 points to 12. For Richmond Bradley, and Colin Cowley who had transferred from Mount Albert where he had played since 1939, "did everything right, and there was a lot of in the effective attacks. Cowley had played 55 games, scored 23 tries, and kicked 2 conversions and a penalty for Mount Albert in senior games in that time. Ron McGregor at centre also played a better game. Among the Richmond forwards Seymour and [Frank] Hilton were outstanding, the former was especially good". For City, two of their representative forwards in Hawea Mataira, and Wirepa Jackson did not play, and Jimmy Matthews was out injured. In their backs Pouvi Salaia at centre "gave a polished display, while [Fred] James stood out as the best forward". At Walker Park, Point Chevalier again played well but were unable to cross the Marist line despite coming close several times. The Marist forwards had to "work hard to hole Wells, [Cecil] Blincoe, Barnes, and Croad and the rest of the Point Chevalier pack". The Marist backs, Dave McWilliams and M. Costello shone in periods. The most impressive player for Point Chevalier was Doyle on the right wing, with "his hard running, and evasive tactics".

8 July	Ponsonby	11-4	North Shore	Carlaw Park 1
1:45	Try: Des Williams, James Brassey, Don Mullett; Con: Arthur Kay		Pen: Jack Laing 2	Referee: H Payne

8 July	Manukau	5-4 (5-0)	Otahuhu	Carlaw Park 1
3:10	Try: Joe Murray; Con: Tom Butler		Pen: Hugh Brady 2	Referee: Jack Donovan

8 July	Mount Albert	9-5	Newton	Carlaw Park 2
1:45	Try: Basil Cranch 2, A Jones		Try: Owen Elliott; Pen: Roy Niwa	Referee: P Bailey

8 July	Richmond	13-12	City	Carlaw Park 2
3:10	Try: C Williams, Bradley, Colin Cowley; Con: C Williams, Seymour		Try: Pouvi (Robert) Salaia, Alan Donovan; Con: Alan Donovan 2 Pen: Alan Donovan	Referee: G Kelly

8 July	Point Chevalier	0-8	Marist	Walker Park
3:00			Try: D McWilliams, Don McLeod; Con: Morrie Brockliss	Referee: H Tate

==== Round 12 ====
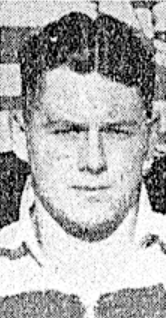
Arthur Kay, who had recently come out of retirement for Ponsonby, kicked 2 goals in their win over Richmond.

City refused to play their match with Manukau in protest at the punishment imposed on Eugene Donovan who had been sent off the week prior. The Auckland Rugby League had said that unless he apologised to the referee (George Kelly) he would remain suspended. As he had not apologised he was unable to play. As a result, the Mount Albert – Marist match which was scheduled for the number 2 field was moved to the main field with a 3:10 kickoff. H Tate refereed his 50th match involving first grade teams becoming the 12th referee to achieve this feat. The fullback play was "of a high order", with Herbert Zane-Zaninovich for Mount Albert and Morrie Brockliss for Marist fielding "cleverly and kicked with good direction and length" on a field described as a "quagmire" with heavy rain falling throughout. Most of the players "were sorely troubled by the difficult conditions" but one player "who showed up in a remarkable way was W. Rangi, the lock for Marist. Les Clement at halfback for Mount Albert made a good play which enabled five eighth Ivan Sumich to score. The try was converted by Basil Cranch and Mount Albert led 5-3 at half time. In the Mount Albert forwards McKinnon, Malam, and Conza "played well". North Shore had a 10-3 win over Point Chevalier with both hookers playing well. The representative hooker, Jock Rutherford "was seen to advantage" for North Shore, winning the ball from the scrums frequently and scoring a good try. His opposite, Francis Goffin scored the only try for Point Chevalier. In the North Shore backs, Gamble at fullback "played a good game... and his fielding under the worst conditions possible, was excellent". At halfback, J. McArthur "was a tower of strength, and varied his play well". Jack Laing and Cave "were also prominent on attack". Laing was the son of former New Zealand representative Bert Laing. Point Chevalier was noted for being a light side and in their backs Rich, Doyle and Davies "were the best", while Barnes, Cecil Blincoe, and E. Croad "did good work amoung the forwards". Ponsonby beat Richmond 7 to 4 with Arthur Kay kicking 2 penalties and Fielder who played well in the loose forwards scoring a try. Travers Hardwick also had a good game in the Ponsonby pack as did Dick Hull and Don Mullett. The suburban game was played at Fowld's Park in Morningside, the home ground of Mount Albert however it was between Otahuhu and Newton with the former winning 14-3. Like Carlaw Park, the ground was "churned up" and the ball was "extremely greasy [which] restricted back play to a considerable extent". Despite this the Otahuhu backs managed "several surprisingly long passing rushes". The highlight of the game was said to be Colin Riley's performance where he kicked 2 penalties and 2 conversions. His "confident, hard, and accurate place kicking is one of his team's greatest assets". At fullback for Newton, McKay was "instrumental in preventing any increase in the score against his side".

15 July	Ponsonby	7-4	Richmond	Carlaw Park 1
1:45	Try: Fielder; Pen: Arthur Kay 2		Pen: J McDonald, R Seymour	Referee: Jack Donovan

15 July	Manukau	WBD-LBD	City	Carlaw Park 1
3:10

15 July	North Shore	10-3	Point Chevalier	Carlaw Park 2
1:45	Try: Bruce Graham, Jock Rutherford; Pen: Jack Laing		Try: Francis Goffin	Referee: H Tate

15 July	Mount Albert	5-3 (5-3)	Marist	Carlaw Park 1
3:10	Try: Ivan Sumich; Con: Basil Cranch		Try: Johnny Simpson	Referee: Stuart Billman

15 July	Otahuhu	14-3	Newton	Fowlds Park, Morningside
3:00	Try: Hugh Brady, Norm Johnson; Con: Colin Riley 2 Pen: Colin Riley 2		Try: James Silva	Referee: Jack Hawkes

==== Round 13 ====
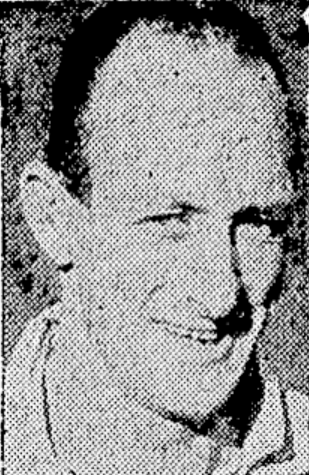
Len Jordan, who had returned from war was instrumental in Ponsonby's come back draw with Manukau.

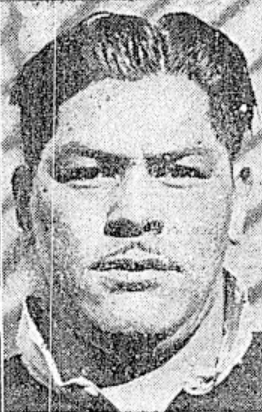
Pita Ririnui played an excellent game in the loose for Manukau.

City once again defaulted their match as Auckland Rugby League still required Eugene Donovan to apologise to the referee and an apology was not forthcoming, City arguing that Donovan's version of events differed from those given by the referee and also that the referee (George Kelly) did not ask for an apology. In the main match Manukau who were leading the league drew 6-6 with Ponsonby. They led 6-0 until near the end when tries to Roy Nurse and Fielder leveled the scored. Manukau scored a try after J Rapana, the Ponsonby fullback was criciticed for kicking too much, with George Shilton, Joe Murray, and Ewe leading a passing rush which saw Reg Martin score giving them a 3-0 halftime lead. They added another try showing "superior speed and good handling" to Tom Butler. Ponsonby fought back however and Arthur Kay and Len Jordan "burst through. The pair handled the ball a second time, and Nurse sent it back to Fielder who scored a great try. Once more Kay and Jordan broke through for Nurse to score. Kay then cut the defence to ribbons in the final moments with Jordan and Nurse racing in support however Kay turned back infield instead of passing and Ralph Martin at fullback saved them. Kay "played a clever pivotal game in the five-eighth line, and the team was strengthened by the reappearance of Len Jordan at centre". He had last played for Ponsonby in 1940 and had gone off to serve in World War 2 in 1941 before recently returning. He would go on to represent New Zealand 7 times from 1946 to 1949 while his son Chris Jordan also played for New Zealand in 1977-78 on 5 occasions. In the loose Ponsonby's standouts were Don Mullett, Darcy Bailey, and Dick Hull. For Manukau their fullback, Ralph Martin "was at his best", while in the forwards George Shilton "played an enterprising game, often coming off the scrum to play the extra back game and assist in launching Manukau attacks" and Ewe and Pita Ririnui "were excellent in the loose". On the #2 field at Carlaw Park, Richmond easily beat Newton 32-0. Colin Cowley and Bernard Lowther both scored 2 tries while Lowther also kicked a conversion. Aubrey Thompson, the Manukau loose forward had transferred to Richmond this season and was playing at five eighths where he had "sharpened up the backs". Cowley and Ron McGregor "combined well, and gave Lowther, on the wing, some good scoring chances". In the Richmond forwards R. Seymour was "outstanding" and scored a "splendid try and added goal points. He was in every attacking movement. Leo Davis played a good game, and was well supported by [Frank] Hilton, and N. Dowling". In the match at Devonport Domain the home side lost 10-3 to Otahuhu. Colin Riley at standoff for Otahuhu kicked a conversion and a penalty. The penalty came from halfway and cleared the cross bar easily. Roy Clark had returned from the war and played at second five eighth for North Shore. His "good all-round play made the Shore backs a more effective attacking force". While Hugh Brady who had recently joined Otahuhu at centre "was impressive", while Hiscocks played a good game on the wing for North Shore.

22 July	Manukau	6-6 (3-0)	Ponsonby	Carlaw Park 1
3:10	Try: Reg Martin, Tom Butler		Try: Fielder, Roy Nurse	Referee: George Kelly

22 July	Mount Albert	18-3	Point Chevalier	Carlaw Park 1
1:45	Try: A Jones 2, Les Clement, Ivan Sumich; Con: Basil Cranch 2 Pen: Basil Cranch		Try: E Croad	Referee: Stuart Billman

22 July	Marist	WBD-LBD	City	Carlaw Park 2
1:45

22 July	Richmond	32-0	Newton	Carlaw Park 2
1:45	Try: Colin Cowley 2, Bernard Lowther 2, Bradley, Frank Hilton, T Kipa, R Seymour; Con: Bernard Lowther, R Seymour, Dowling 2			Referee: E Longville

22 July	North Shore	3-10	Otahuhu	Devonport Domain
3:00	Try: Hiscocks		Try: Ivan Johnson, K Simons; Con: Colin Riley; Pen: Colin Riley	Referee: J O'Shannessey

==== Round 14 ====
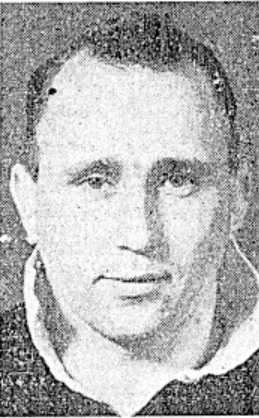
Harold Milliken made his debut for Mount Albert. He was an All Black in 1938 and then represented New Zealand rugby league team in 1939. A former Papakura player he hadn't played since 1940.

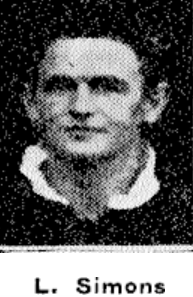
Lindsay Simons, the veteran played had a good game for Marist in the backs. He had first played for North Shore in 1927 and spent time playing in Wellington, and also for the City club in Auckland.

The suspension of Eugene Donovan was lifted by the Auckland Rugby League, but ironically their opponent, Newton, defaulted the match which was due to be played at Walker Park. Newton was still win less to this point in the season. In the early game on the #1 field at Carlaw Park, Otahuhu beat Marist 5-2. There wasn't much between the forwards and both sides tried hard to initiate attacks in the backs. In the second half veteran player Lindsay Simons "gave a good display" for Marist in the backs and Maurice Costello, Gerry Hughes, and Jimmy White also teamed well. The main match was won 15 to 14 by Richmond over Manukau which opened back up the championship race. A large crowd was present and they saw Richmond score within two minutes of the start with Colin Cowley "capping a swift passing movement ". They added another 5 points to take a 10-0 lead before Manukau could respond and make the score 10-3 at halftime. Manukau's side had settled down after the early set back and George Shilton, Pita Ririnui, and Wiremu Te Tai were playing well. For Richmond Ron McGregor "played an outstanding game and had good support from [Bernard] Lowther, Cowley, and [Aubrey] Thompson". McGregor "was easily the best back on the ground and he must have played his way into the representative team". Manukau scored two tries bringing them to within a point but Richmond held them off. North Shore and Mount Albert were said to have played one of the best games seen on the number 2 field this year. The match was drawn 10-10. Harold Milliken, former All Black turned out for the first time for Mount Albert and "was prominent in the loose although not yet in condition. He is a decided acquisition" to their forwards. He had switched codes in 1940 when he joined the Papakura senior side and had been away at war. North Shore won the majority of the ball from the scrums thanks to the hooking of Jock Rutherford who the Auckland Star said was surprisingly omitted from the Auckland team. Jack Zane-Zaninovich "played a splendid game at five-eighth for Mount Albert, and was, perhaps the best back on the ground". A. Jones and Ivan Sumich also played well for Mount Albert, while Roy Clark "played a sterling game for Mount Albert". In the late match on the number 2 ground Ponsonby played an "uneventful game" against Point Chevalier, winning 17 to 13. Former New Zealand representative, John Anderson played in the forwards for Point Chevalier. Ponsonby were said to appear "to hold something in reserve throughout". Point Chevalier were missing their captain, back, Wilfred Dormer who had played for Ponsonby from 1938 to 1943. Their best back on the day was right winger Doyle, who scored one of their tries. Both forwards were evenly matched and Ponsonby winger Roy Nurse was "in form and scored three tries" while J Rapana at full back also played a good game.

29 July	Otahuhu	5-2	Marist	Carlaw Park 1
1:45	Try: H Brady; Pen: Colin Riley		Pen: Morrie Brockliss	Referee: J O'Shannessey

29 July	Richmond	15-14	Manukau	Carlaw Park 1
3:10	Try: Colin Cowley, Bernard Lowther, Seymour; Con: Seymour 3		Try: Joe Murray, George Shilton, Reg Martin, Tom Butler; Con: Tom Butler	Referee: Jack Donovan

29 July	North Shore	10-10	Mount Albert	Carlaw Park 2
1:45	Try: Mercer, Graham; Con: Roy Clark; Pen: Roy Clark		Try: A Jones, Ivan Sumich; Con: Basil Cranch	Referee: Stuart Billman

29 July	Ponsonby	17-13	Point Chevalier	Carlaw Park 2
3:10	Try: Roy Nurse 3, Don Mullett, Len Jordan; Pen: Len Jordan		Try: Doyle, John Anderson, Len Davies; Con: Rich; Pen: Rich	Referee: Jack Hawkes

29 July	City	WBD-LBD	Newton	Walker Park
3:00				Referee: H Tate

==== Round 15 ====
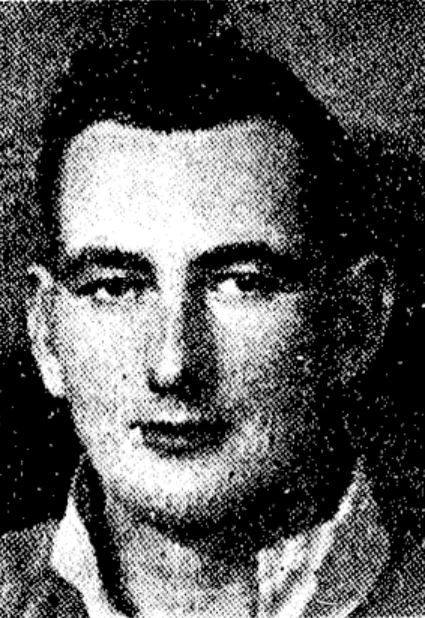
John Anderson, who had recently joined Point Chevalier scored a try. Originally from the West Coast he joined the Marist club in 1936 and played over 100 games for them. He represented New Zealand 5 times on their 1938 tour of Australia.

In the 3:10 game at Carlaw Park number 1 the game between Ponsonby and Mount Albert resulted in a 9-9 draw. Mount Albert only scored one try to Richard Shadbolt who had not played for Mount Albert since 1942, but the kicking of winger, Basil Cranch saw them reach 9 points. Ponsonby on the other hand scored three tries but could not kick any goals missing 3 conversions and 3 penalty attempts all from "reasonably easy positions". Ponsonby was missing 2 of its best forwards in Dick Hull and Darcy Bailey, though Don Mullett was "outstanding" and scored a try following a "clever dribbling effort". And Hermes Hadley also played a "fine game". He scored a try after Mullett and Travers Hardwick led the Ponsonby forwards in an attack. A few minutes later the same forwards were involved in an attack which led to Arthur Kay taking a pass from Fielder and racing over. In the earlier game Marist beat Richmond 11 to 6 with J. Smith scoring 2 tries and Maurice Costello 1. Their defence was said to "probably be the deciding factor". Gerry Hughes, and Costello "featured in some bright movements, and the wing, Smith also showed up with fast running". While in their forwards Ivan Simpson, Don McLeod and Lindsay Simons "were able to find scope for their favourite brand of open play". For Richmond, N. Dowling, Leo Davis, and Frank Hilton "were in the thick of the forward play". City played a well contested game with North Shore and won 15 to 10. Roy Clark "played splendidly" for Shore at five eighth and the Auckland Star wrote that it would be no surprise to see him paired with Joe Murray in a later Auckland side. In the centre position for City, Pouvi Salaia "got through a lot of useful work, and was a thorn in the side of the Shore defence. Salaia does not get a great deal of assistance from the City five-eighths and there is all the more credit due for his ability as an attacking back". There was no individual scoring reported from the match at Fowlds Park in Morningside where Manukau beat Newton 29 to 10.

12 August	Marist	11-6	Richmond	Carlaw Park 1
1:45	Try: J Smith 2, Maurice Costello; Con: Morrie Brockliss		Try: Colin Cowley, Walker	Referee: Jack Donovan

12 August	Mount Albert	9-9 (2-6)	Ponsonby	Carlaw Park 1
3:10	Try: Richard Shadbolt; Con: Basil Cranch; Pen: Basil Cranch 2		Try: Hermes Hadley, Arthur Kay, Don Mullett	Referee: Stuart Billman

12 August	Otahuhu	31-17	Point Chevalier	Carlaw Park 2
1:45	Try: Cliff Wellm 2, K Simons, Sanderson, John Speedy; Con: Colin Riley 5 Pen: Colin Riley 3		Try: John Anderson, Barnes, Len Davies; Con: Len Davies 3 Pen: Len Davies	Referee: P Bailey

12 August	City	15-10	North Shore	Carlaw Park 2
3:10	Try: Alan Donovan, Bert Leatherbarrow, Harold Gee; Con: Alan Donovan 2 Pen: George Bodman		Try: Horace Hunt, Roy Clark; Con: Roy Clark 2	Referee: H Payne

12 August	Manukau	29-10	Newton	Fowlds Park, Morningside
3:00	Try: no scoring reported		Try: no scoring reported	Referee: George Kelly

==== Round 16 ====
Going into this round, with 3 remaining the top of the table was extremely competitive with teams on 22, 20, 20, 20, 18, and 18 competition points. Crucially Manukau, who had been in first place lost to Marist, while near rivals Mount Albert and City both won leveling all 3 teams on 22 points. City had a hard fought win over Point Chevalier who battled hard. City's good forward pack began to show their best form late in the second half. Otahuhu who had been on 20 competition points faltered with a loss also. There was no individual scoring reported in the match at the Devonport Domain between North Shore and Richmond. In Marist's 12-0 win Morrie Brockliss "one of the most improved players of the season, gave a splendid exhibition at fullback... fielding faultlessly, kicking with length and judgment, and putting up a resolute defence". He was also responsible for half their points with a conversion, and 2 penalties. Marist led 9-0 at halftime and the game was said to be beyond doubt by this stage with Manukau failing to score a single point. J Smith who scored 2 tries and Iain Te Weri who played his first game for several weeks and had requested a transfer only a week earlier, "were prominent on attack". At half back Gordon Crocker "got through a lot of useful work, and played his best game this season". In the Marist forwards Don McLeod, Ashley Best, Lindsay Simons, and Skinner "worked hard". The best game of the day at Carlaw Park was said to be the match between Otahuhu and Mount Albert won by the later 15 to 14. Otahuhu scored 4 tries to 3 but could only manage a conversion by Colin Riley while left winger, Basil Cranch was again in kicking form for Mount Albert converting 2 of their 3 tries and adding a penalty. He had also scored 2 of the tries himself for a personal haul of 12 points. A. Jones and Ivan Sumich "figured prominently in the back play, with Herbert Zane-Zaninovich a sound full-back". Jack Speedy the Otahuhu halfback was said to have been "the superior of [Les] Clement, the Mt. Albert and Auckland half, who was penalised on a surprisingly large number of occasions". Newton played on of their better games of the season but still lost to Ponsonby 13 to 3. Their forwards did "good work" and were "heavier all round" than Ponsonby's set. Amongst Newton's best players were W. Briggs at five eighth, and J. Sullivan in the forwards who were both ex Ponsonby players.

19 August	Mount Albert	15-14	Otahuhu	Carlaw Park 1
1:45	Try: Basil Cranch 2, Les Clement; Con: Basil Cranch 2 Pen: Basil Cranch		Try: John Speedy, K Simons, Hugh Brady, Jim Fogarty; Con: Colin Riley	Referee: Jack Hawkes

19 August	Marist	12-0 (9-0)	Manukau	Carlaw Park 1
3:10	Try: Gordon Crocker, J Smith; Con: Morrie Brockliss; Pen: Morrie Brockliss 2			Referee: J O'Shannessey

19 August	City	10-5	Point Chevalier	Carlaw Park 2
1:45	Try: Pouvi (Robert) Salaia, Innes; Con: Alan Donovan; Pen: Alan Donovan		Try: Porteous; Pen: John Anderson	Referee: H Tate

19 August	Ponsonby	13-3	Newton	Carlaw Park 2
3:10	Try: Roy Nurse, James Brassey, Don Mullett; Con: Roy Nurse; Pen: Roy Nurse		Try: Owen Elliott	Referee: George Kelly

19 August	North Shore	5-8	Richmond	Devonport Domain
3:00	Try: no scoring reported		Try: no scoring reported	Referee: Stuart Billman

==== Round 17 ====
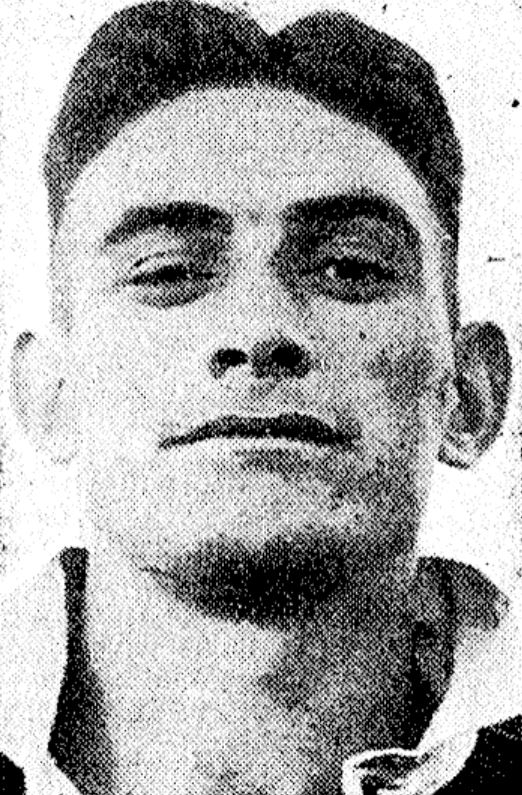
Jack Brodrick made a rare appearance for Manukau. He had retired at the end of 1940 but made the occasional appearance for them in the years since. He played 7 games for New Zealand in 1938 and 1939.

In the early match on the number 1 field Ponsonby beat Marist 20 to 13. Roy Nurse and Len Jordan "were outstanding" and helped their backline penetrate "the Marist defence to give the side a decisive win". Nurse ran in four tries, all of those scored by their backline. In their forwards Darcy Bailey and Dick Hull played well. Marist only managed one try, to one of the Johnson brothers (Johnny or Ivan), while Morrie Brockliss had an impressive day with the boot kicking five penalties. In the Marist forwards the Simpson brothers, Don McLeod and Lindsay Simons "were prominent". Norm Johnson of Otahuhu was ordered off in their match with City which was the feature game of the day. City won 20-10 to keep their championship hopes alive. They led 7-0 at halftime but Otahuhu came back to take the lead. Neither team combined very well and it was individual play which stood out more. Alan Donovan in his seventh season with the City senior side "was in his best form as a goal kicker, and landed four goals". He also showed speed from the base of the scrum at halfback and gave good support to his backs also adding a try. In the City side Warwick Clarke "played a fine game at fullback and [Pouvi] Salaia made a few nice runs". In their forwards Hawea Mataira "stood out prominently, while [Wirepa] Jackson, and Bert Leatherbarrow did good work". For Otahuhu, Cliff Wellm showed "great pace" in scoring two tries. For the first one he "followed through fast, fielded a bouncing ball, and then outpaced everybody". For his second he followed a passing movement "and then took the gap with a lateral run with such a burst of speed that he was untouched by the opposition". During the week the Otahuhu club wrote protesting against the refereeing. The matter was discussed in committee and the chairman reported that the Otahuhu club would be communicated with. It was decided that Norm Johnson, the Otahuhu player who had been sent off, would receive no further punishment. Mount Albert defeated Richmond 26 to 10 on Carlaw Park number 2 with Basil Cranch scoring two tries and kicking four goals. The win was a surprise as Richmond were expected to have a strong side on a dry ground. Les Clement at halfback and Ivan Sumich and A. Jones in the five eighths combined well. Sumich "played easily his best game this season. Jones was also impressive and twice cut the defence to ribbons with clever running and tricky play". In the Mount Albert forwards Richard Shadbolt scored twice and "was in every movement, and played an outstanding game. He followed up fast, and tackled soundly". Harold Milliken "also showed a glimpse of his form of three years ago, and played splendidly. Conza was a tireless worker in the loose". Newton finally recorded their first win of the season when they beat North Shore 8-4. Two of their new players, D. Muru and George A. Woolley were the best of their backs. Muru on the wing "revealed a lot of speed, and a very tricky run". Woolley was said to be "an acquisition as a good goal-kicker". The match between Manukau and Point Chevalier was played at Onehunga Primary School. Manukau won 21- 13 in a game which featured a rare appearance from former New Zealand player Jack Brodrick in 1937 and 1938. Despite only being aged 31 he had largely stopped playing at the end of the 1940 season aged 27. He was said to have been a mainstay of the Manukau pack in the win along with Pita Ririnui himself also a former New Zealand international in 1939. For Point Chevalier John Anderson "was outstanding, mainly for his speed in breaking from the ruck". During the week the league expressed their sympathy to the family of W.J. Gibbons who had died. He had been a former time keeper for games at Carlaw Park.

26 August	Ponsonby	20-13	Marist	Carlaw Park 1
1:45	Try: Roy Nurse 4, Des Williams, Darcy Bailey; Pen: Cocks		Try: Simpson; Pen: Morrie Brockliss 5	Referee: J O'Shannessey

26 August	City	20-10 (7-0)	Otahuhu	Carlaw Park 1
3:10	Try: Jimmy Matthews 2, Hawea Mataira, Alan Donovan; Con: Alan Donovan 2 Pen: Alan Donovan 2		Try: Cliff Wellm 2 Con: Colin Riley 2	Referee: Jack Donovan

26 August	Newton	8-4	North Shore	Carlaw Park 2
1:45	Try: Owen Elliott, B Gallagher; Con: G.A. Woolley		Pen: Horace Hunt 2	Referee: C Knott

26 August	Mount Albert	26-10	Richmond	Carlaw Park 2
3:10	Try: Richard Shadbolt 2, Basil Cranch 2, Les Clement, A Jones; Con: Basil Cranch 3 Pen: Basil Cranch		Try: Potter, Bernard Lowther; Con: Bernard Lowther; Pen: Bernard Lowther	Referee: George Kelly

26 August	Manukau	21-13	Point Chevalier	Onehunga Primary School
3:00	Try: Pokaiwa, George Shilton, E Opai, Joe Murray, Ralph Martin; Con: Tom Butler 3		Try: John Anderson, Francis Goffin, Porteous; Con: John Anderson 2	Referee: H Tate

==== Round 18 ====
With City and Mount Albert both winning and Manukau losing it meant that the two former teams were tied on 26 competition points with Manukau dropping into third. With the round robin completed it meant that City and Mount Albert had to play off for the Fox Memorial title for 1944. Richmond scored their 4,000 first grade point in their 26–9 win over Otahuhu. In the early kickoff on the number 1 field City had a good 14-8 win over Ponsonby who had been the form team in the second round of games. The Auckland Star wrote that it "proved one of the best games seen this season, and the early crowd was treated to some exciting and high-class play". The City five eighths A. Silva and W. Cossey "played easily their best game this season, and the pair combined effectively throughout. Silva was particularly good and had usually played on the wing but was "outstanding" at five eighth. His tackling was sound and he never missed a chance to open up the game for Salaia, the centre. Cossey could not be faulted, and Alan Donovan, at half-back did everything right". It was noted that there was little fault with the way Ponsonby played and they were unlucky to meet City at the top of its form. It was also mentioned that Arthur Kay and Des Williams in the five eighths "could have cut through the defence more often to open up the play for fast three-quarters. Williams tried it twice, and he nearly brought off tries". Darcy Bailey who was usually a loose forward struggled on the wing but still went well as an attacking back, while D Manley at fullback "started off well, but later his tackling was weak and his kicking lacked power". In the later kickoff the match between Manukau and Mount Albert was effectively a semi final to achieve a playoff with City for the Fox Memorial title. Mount Albert won a closely fought game 10 to 7. It was the play of Mount Albert in the second half which won them the game after they had trailed 0-2 at halftime. The refereeing was criticised with "far too many stoppages for minor breaches, and the continual blowing of the whistle slowed the game down". Their advantage was said to have started with Stanley Thomassen at hooker who won a good share of the ball from the scrums. His fellow forwards Richard Shadbolt, Harold Milliken, and Conza "gave splendid support". At halfback for Mount Albert Les Clement "gave a sharp and good scrum service", and scored "a brilliant solo try". While Ivan Sumich and A. Jones in the five eighths teamed well and gave the three-quarters a lot of ball with Moore in the wing playing well. Herbert Zane-Zaninovich at fullback "played a particularly fine game, and compared favourably with [Ralph] Martin, who gave his usual polished display". Joe Murray scored a try for Manukau which was converted by Ralph Martin to make the score 8-7 before a penalty to Basil Cranch sealed Mount Albert's win. There was no mention of any score from the Point Chevalier match against Newton at Walker Park in Point Chevalier. With both teams at the foot of the table it is possible that the match was not played. Referee Jack Hawkes officiated in his 50th match involving first grade sides, becoming the 13th Auckland referee to do so up until this point.

2 September	Mount Albert	10-7 (0-2)	Manukau	Carlaw Park 1
3:10	Try: Harold Milliken, Les Clement; Con: Basil Cranch; Pen: Basil Cranch		Try: Joe Murray; Con: Ralph Martin; Pen: Ralph Martin	Referee: J O'Shannessey

2 September	City	14-8	Ponsonby	Carlaw Park 1
1:45	Try: George Bodman, B Taylor, A Silva, Pouvi (Robert) Salaia; Con: A Silva		Try: Darcy Bailey, Len Jordan; Con: Roy Nurse	Referee: George Kelly

2 September	Marist	12-5	North Shore	Carlaw Park 2
3:10	Try: J Smith 2 Con: Morrie Brockliss; Pen: Morrie Brockliss 2		Try: Bruce Graham; Pen: Horace Hunt	Referee: Jack Hawkes

2 September	Richmond	26-9	Otahuhu	Carlaw Park 2
1:45	Try: Bernard Lowther 3, Dowling, Potter, R Seymour; Con: Bernard Lowther 4		Try: K Simons; Pen: Colin Riley	Referee: P Bailey

2 September	Point Chevalier	?-?	Newton	Walker Park, Point Chevalier
3:00				Referee: Jack Donovan

==== Championship final ====
Following the final round of the championship the league decided to play the final 3 weeks later due to representative fixtures being played prior. This led to a protest letter from the Mount Albert club who felt the gap was too long and that the final should have "priority over other fixtures". Future New Zealand representative Warwick Clarke was ruled out for City due to injury. Arnold Jones, the Mount Albert five eighth was also said to be unavailable due to injury but ultimately did play and scored a try for the losing Mount Albert side. He had proved to be a star recruit from Glenora two season prior and had excelled in the Mount Albert five eighths along with Ivan Sumich during the current season. The game was marked by "keen defence and fiery tackling" early in the match. Les Clement, the Mount Albert halfback opening the scoring with a close range penalty. City then spent time on attack with George Bodman the City lock gathering the ball and crossing by the corner flag to give them a 3-2 lead. Bert Leatherbarrow was winning the ball "cleanly" from the scrums which gave half back Alan Donovan "a wealth of chances to get the City backs going". Donovan then kicked a nice penalty goal to put them 5-2 in front. He continued to send "the ball away with deep, sharp passing" but W. Cossey outside him was uncertain with his handling. Clement put Mount Albert back on attack with a solo effort but it was through a penalty that they got their next points (5-4). They attacked again through nice work by Clement, Sumich, and Moore on the wing but the tackling of both sides was proving successful and Clement missed a close range penalty which meant at halftime the score was still 5-4. After the resumption Clement was involved in a blindside move which took play to the City line with Harold Milliken prominent in leading the Mount Albert forwards "in a resolute way". Both sets of supporters "cheered ... for every yard of progress, but as a spectacle the game did not reach a high plane, and the referee's whistle often halted effort". Mount Albert had several attacking scrums and Clement was getting the ball away to Sumich well but jones "was uncertain in handling, and the ball did not flow in an even way to the Mount Albert three-quarter line". City began to open up their play and A. Silva and Pouvi Salaia were "thrustful and quick to run their wings into position". R. Taylor was sent away and evaded Moore and Herbert Zane-Zaninovich but was caught by the convering defence. City kept up their attacks and Zane-Zaninovich was doing well for Mount Albert to keep them out. From a wide angle Silva kicked a penalty for City, and then shortly after Eugene Donovan made a fast run to get them back into a good position, and Alan Donovan whipped the ball out to the City first five-eighth W. Cossey who beat his marker and scored close to the posts. Silva's conversion gave them a 12-4 lead. Mount Albert's defence was again caught out when Jimmy Matthews got the ball on the wing and was able to circle round behind the posts with Silva's conversion giving them an unassailable 17-4 lead. Mount Albert managed to rally late with "lateral movement and passing" seeing them cross the City 25 and a pass from Clement to Jones saw the latter score by the corner flag to bring the score to 17-7 which it remained.

23 September	City	17-7 (5-4)	Mount Albert	Carlaw Park 1
3:00	Try: George Bodman, Jimmy Matthews; Con: A Silva 2 Pen: A Silva, Alan Donovan		Try: Arnold Jones; Pen: Les Clement 2	Referee: George Kelly

=== Roope Rooster ===
==== Round 1 ====
North Shore scored an upset win over Richmond after trailing 4-8 at halftime. Early in the game Horace Hunt kicked a penalty for North Shore. R. Seymour, Mojnt Albert's loose forward was playing a good game in the loose "broke away and pushing off two tacklers, passed to [Ernie] Pinches, who scored". Bernard Lothwers conversion gave Richmond a 5-2 lead. Richmond continued to attack and Roberston sent the ball on to Ron McGregor "who pierced the defence to cross". The conversion missed but Richmond now held an 8-2 lead as halftime arrived. In the second half Roy Clark, "playing promisingly at five eighth ... passed to send McArthur over between the posts" and with Clark converting they now only trailed by one. Richmond attacked the North Shore line hard but Gamble at fullback for North Shore played a safe game and they held them off. The Shore forwards were "working hard" and from a scrimmage sent the ball to Hunt who passed to winger, R. Taylor who scored. Clark's conversion gave them the 14-8 score which they held. In the other match Newton beat Point Chevlalier 18-5. The game "opened up at a fast pace, and a feature was the rugged play of the Newton forwards. John Anderson the former New Zealand second rower missed three penalty attempts in the first half "by inches". Point Chevalier "had little better of the game, and Walker raced hard for the try line but a good tackle by W. Briggs stopped him".. Godfrey Sorby opened up the scoring with a drop goal and then Briggs and Woolley placed Newton into a scoring position and from a scrum Scarlett passed to Elliott but Wells at fullback saved. Point Chevalier attacked further through Barnes and Walker could not cross and the halftime score was Newton 2 Point Chevalier 0. In the second half Frank Zimmerman who "was fresh from his boxing exploits, raced 30 yards, but hung on a little long to hold up a promising Newton offensive". Newton attacked further and eventually "Scarlett passed to Woolley who made a fine opening, and raced over for a good try" with Sorby converting to give Newton a 7-0 lead. Anderson opened Point Chevaliers scoring with a penalty and after an attacking exchange Woolley scored another try for Newton, and then he scored again from "a fine passing bout". Woolley added a third try and Point Chevalier replied with a try to Humphries on the wing with Sorby converting to finish the scoring.

23 September	North Shore	14-8 (4-8)	Richmond	Carlaw Park 1
1:45	Try: J McArthur, B Taylor; Con: Roy Clark 2 Pen: Roy Clark, Horace Hunt		Try: Ernie Pinches, Ron McGregor; Con: Bernard Lowther	Referee: Stuart Billman

23 September	Newton	18-5 (2-0)	Point Chevalier	Carlaw Park 2
1:45	Try: G.A. Woolley 3, N McKay; Con: Godfrey Sorby 2 Drop: Godfrey Sorby		Try: Humphries; Pen: John Anderson	Referee: Jack Hawkes

==== Round 2 ====
In the principal match at Carlaw Park Ponsonby easily beat City 31 to 17 after leading 16 to 5 at halftime. Warwick Clarke was back at full back for City, though Alan Donovan was missing from the halfback position and was replaced by Cunningham, a player from Northland. In the Ponsonby backs two rugby players were in their side, Gordon Littlejohn at fullback who had come from the Manukau rugby club, and Brian Nordgren on the right wing. Nordgren would prove to be a prolific try scorer for Ponsonby scoring 5 tries in the coming weeks and 23 in 1945 before signing to play for Wigan in England where he would play for ten seasons, scoring 312 tries in 294 games. For Ponsonby Roy Nurse scored two tries and added a conversion, while Arthur Kay at five eighths who played "a fine pivotal game" scored a try and kicked four goals. Len Jordan at centre "was showing cleverness in directing the attack". Loose forwards Travers Hardwick and Dick Hull also crossed for tries. In the City side Hawea Mataira led the forwards well and Taylor showed speed in the backs. In the second half Raymond Lohenet began to win most of the ball from the scrums and Dacre Black at halfback "was sending the ball away with clean, well-directed passing", then from loose play Hardwick gained his try. They now led 31-12 before City got a consolation try to Jimmy Matthews converted by Arthur Silva. On the number 2 field in the late kickoff Newton upset Marist 11 points to 10. They led 11-5 at halftime and despite not scoring another point held on for the victory. Shepherd opened the scoring when the winger "outpaced the Newton backs" following good play from Maurice Costello and J Smith. Marist was unfortunate to lose Costello to an injury soon after. Newton's forwards Sullivan and Te Haara "caught Marist out of position, and Scarlett snapped up to score a really good try" with Godfrey Sorby converting to give them a 5-3 lead. Morrie Brockliss kicked a penalty goal to level the scores. Then just before halftime Scarlett scored for Newton and D. Muru "raced away" to add 3 more points for what ultimately proved to be a decisive try. Early in the second half Brockliss kicked a penalty and then a while later Gordon Crocker "burst through to score a nice try" from a scrum 30 yards out though the conversion missed. Both teams attacked hard at various stages and Smith and White went close to winning the game for Marist but "a popular win was recorded to Newton". In the early kickoff on the number 1 field North Shore defeated Manukau 18 to 8. Manukau began the game a man short and usual star full back Ralph Martin had to play in the five eighths. Tom Butler had moved into the full back position from his normal wing position and he scored the first points through a penalty struck from ten yards inside halfway. North Shore responded through a try to half back J. McArthur after taking a pass from prop Tom Field. Ranginui Ewe scored a "surprise try who fell over the line with a tackler hanging on to him". The teams traded more points before halftime with North Shore leading 8-5. New signing for North Shore, Arthur Reid on the wing was involved in some attacking efforts and early in the second half and was forced out in the corner after an "excellent effort". Roy Clark at five eighth was playing well with his partner J.W. Priest who had just joined the side but Manukau were "defending strongly but showing little combination". Another new player for North Shore, W.J. Walker in the centres made a good run to get them near the try line and then Clark kicked across field for McArthur to score. Soon after Clark "penetrated brilliantly and sent to Bruce Graham who dived across to score". Later in the game Pita Ririnui in the Manukau forwards "carried play to the Shore end, where [Kenneth] Finlayson passed to Werohia, who scored". The game ended soon after. Mount Albert eliminated Otahuhu from the Roope Rooster with a 10-8 win after leading 6-3 at halftime. Mount Albert were missing Harold Milliken and Arnold Jones. Otahuhu gave away several penalties for offide and Herbert Zane-Zaninovich kicked three penalty goals to take a 6-0 lead. Graham Simpson who had played for City previously was in the five eighths was prominent and passed to Colin Riley who went close to scoring. Then good play by Cliff Wellm set up a try for Norm Johnson to make it 6-3 at half time after Mount Albert lost a try when Jack Zane-Zaninovich mishandled from a break by Les Clement and Ivan Sumich. Early in the second half Dick Shadbolt the Mount Albert prop headed a forward attack which led to a penalty goal from Clement. Then Otahuhu drew level after Colin Riley made a "brilliant opening and beat the defence badly, before passing to [Cliff] Wellm, who ran on to score easily the best try of the game". Otahuhu was on top but the Mount Albert defence was "very sound" and the Mount Albert backs kicked instead of passing which lost them chances. Then right on time Herbert Zane-Zaninovich kicked a penalty goal to win the game.

30 September	North Shore	18-8 (8-5)	Manukau	Carlaw Park 1
1:45	Try: J McArthur 2, Hiscock, Bruce Graham; Con: Roy Clark 2 Pen: Roy Clark		Try: Ranginui Ewe, W.L. Werohia; Pen: Tom Butler	Attendance: 9,500; Referee: H Tate

30 September	Ponsonby	31-17 (16-5)	City	Carlaw Park 1
3:00	Try: Dacre Black, Roy Nurse 2, Arthur Kay, Dick Hull, Len Jordan, Travers Hardwick; Con: Roy Nurse, Arthur Kay 3 Pen: Arthur Kay		Try: B Taylor, George Bodman, Jimmy Matthews; Con: Albert Silva 3 Pen: Albert Silva	Referee: J O'Shannessey

30 September	Mount Albert	10-8 (6-3)	Otahuhu	Carlaw Park 2
1:45	Pen: Herbert Zane-Zaninovich 4, Les Clement		Try: Norm Johnson, Cliff Wellm; Con: Colin Riley	Referee: George Kelly

30 September	Newton	11-10 (11-5)	Marist	Carlaw Park 2
3:00	Try: Scarlett 2, D Muru; Con: Godfrey Sorby		Try: Shepherd, Gordon Crocker; Pen: Morrie Brockliss 2	Referee: Jack Hawkes

==== Semi finals ====
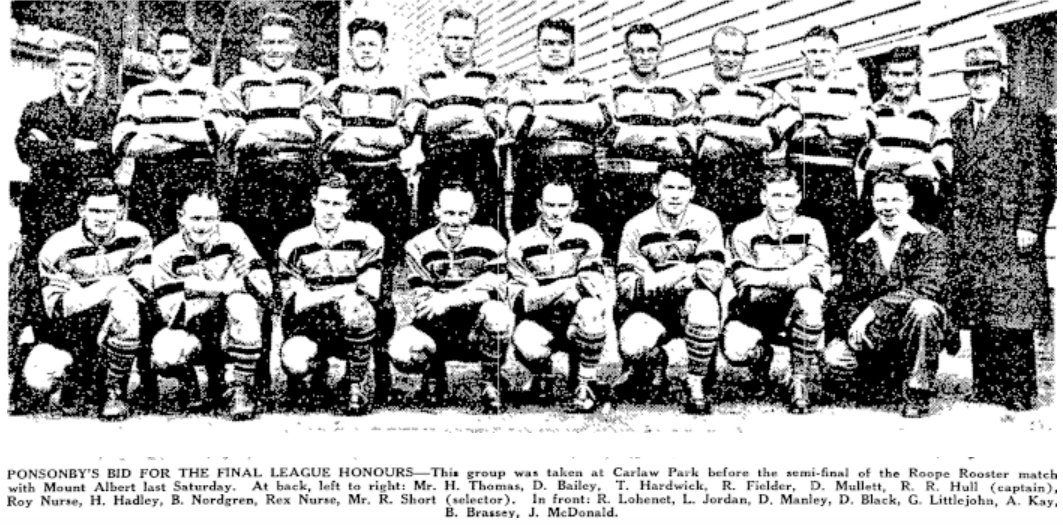
The Ponsonby team outside the railway stand before their match with Mount Albert.

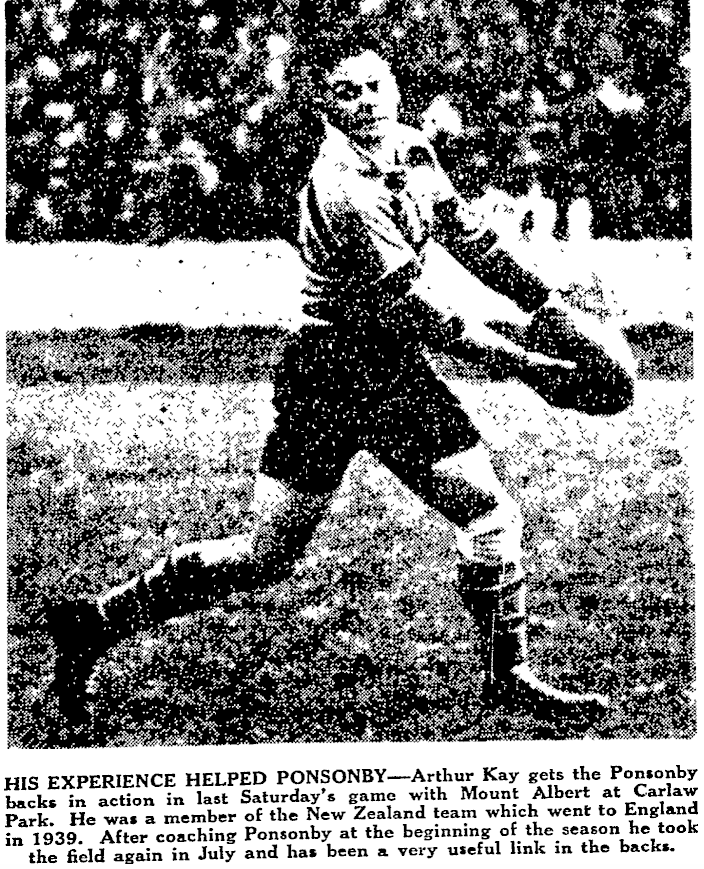
Arthur Kay passing the ball for Ponsonby in their semi-final win.

Late in the match between Mount Albert and Ponsonby Mount Albert's Richard (Dick) Shadbolt was sent off for fighting. It was the fourth time that he had been sent off in senior rugby league. He had been cautioned three times already and had "a final serious talking to" before the final incident. The league decided to "severely warn" him.

In the early game between North Shore and Newton the Devonport based side won 13 to 0. North Shore scored tries to Hiscock, J. McArthur and Taylor with Roy Clark converting a try and kicking a penalty. Their first try came when J. McArthur at halfback for Shore attacked to the right and Clark and Cave came into position for Cave to sell a dummy and send Taylor in for a try. Clark was playing brilliantly in the five eighths line but Newton held out well. Then McArthur ran by himself on the blind side of s scrum to score. Jock Rutherford was winning most of the scrum ball from his opposite Sullivan. Near the end of the game Gamble the North Shore fullback ran upfield and passed to Clark who sent it to the right wing, Hiscock who had too much pace for the Newton pursuit" and scored to finish the scoring. In the main match Ponsonby defeated Mount Albert 17 to 2. Len Jordan scored 2 tries for Ponsonby in the centre position, while Brian Nordgren the new sensation for Ponsonby also scored twice. Their other try scorer was Travers Hardwick while Arthur Kay kicked a conversion. They opened the scoring after a forward attack which Hardwick finished off for Kay to convert. Kay then cut through again and threw a back hand pass for Jordan to "streak over for a classy try". Late in the first half the Ponsonby forwards "with Don Mullett in the van swept over the opposition, and the boxing champion kicked over the line for Brian Nordgren to dive on the ball for a splendid try". Darcy Bailey was injured just before halftime and replaced by Fielder. In the second half Roy Nurse made a "beautiful opening before passing to Jordan who outpaced the opposition to score" with Kay converting. After tempers frayed Richard Shadbolt was sent off. Towards the end of the game Jorand took the ball and passed to Kay, and then Dacre Black made some ground for Fielder, leading to Nordgren scoring to end the game.

7 October	North Shore	13-0 (5-0)	Newton	Carlaw Park 1
1:45	Try: Taylor, J McArthur, Hiscock; Con: Roy Clark; Pen: Roy Clark			Referee: Stuart Billman

7 October	Ponsonby	17-2 (11-2)	Mount Albert	Carlaw Park 1
3:00	Try: Travers Hardwick, Len Jordan 2, Brian Nordgren 2 Con: Arthur Kay		Pen: Herbert Zane-Zaninovich	Referee: Jack Donovan

==== Roope Rooster final ====
Playing for Ponsonby were Darcy Bailey, a former Canterbury rugby representative and J.W. Priest, a former Taranaki rugby representative. For North Shore, Arthur L. Read, a former Poverty Bay rugby player also played. North Shore led 10–3 at halftime before a big comeback by Ponsonby which won the second half 16 to 3 to claim their 6th Roope Rooster title 19 points to 13. The game started "with spectacular football, the Ponsonby backs showing speed, and throwing the ball about with freedom". Raymond Lohenet was winning scrum ball for Ponsonby and Des Black "was quick to open up attack" from halfback. Brian Nordgren on the right wing came in and made an extra back on the other side of the field. Arthur Kay at five eighths "showed skill at making the opening before contacting Len Jordan in the centre. However the North Shore defence was "sound and good" with Roy Clark "going in fast to hold the Ponsonby attack, and Gamble at fullback, disclosing admirable cover defence". The North Shore forwards occasionally "stormed upfield ... and Littljohn, the Ponsonby fullback, won applause for clever clearances". The first try of the game came when J McArthur "cut through the Ponsonby inside backs, drew Littlejohn and passed to send Taylor across to score close to the posts". Later in the first half Lohenet won a scrum and Des Black sent the ball to Manley to Kay to Jordan who crossed wide out. North Shore then replied when Hiscock, the "speedy Shore left wing made a big run" and then worked infield and passed further infield to Taylor who "raced in for his second try" to make the half time score 10-3 in North Shore's favour. After the halftime break Fielder had replaced Darcy Bailey who had been injured in the first half. Then Brian Nordgren made a spectacular run, he "worked quickly through a wide gap before converging defence could trap him, [and] veered out sharply to avoid Gamble, the Shore fullback, and then gave an exhibition of speed to circle and score by the posts. Arthur Kay's conversion narrowed the score to 10-8. The speed of Nordgren and Jordan then gave Ponsonby the lead. Nordgren "raced along the sideline, and then inpassed to Jordan. with full speed on the Ponsonby centre gathered his pass, veered out to score wide amid great enthusiasm on the part of Ponsonby supporters". Ponsonby added to their lead when Arthur Kay "made a good opening with a lateral run, and the ball went via Jordan to Nordgren. The winger broke through a good tackle effort by Clark, and then had a clear field to sail in by the flag". To essentially finish the game Kay made a diagonal run which caught the Shore backs "out of position. He then reverse-passed to send Jordan in for his third try" with Kay's conversion giving them a 19-10 lead. shore played "valiantly" towards the end. The North Shore fullback, Gamble worked his way through the inside backs of Ponsonby but didn't have support. Soon after Arthur Read made "two hard dashes" and got play to the try line where Bruce Graham dived over to finish the scoring. Read was a wrestling champion.

14 October	Ponsonby	19-13 (3-10)	North Shore	Carlaw Park 1
3:00	Try: Len Jordan 3, Brian Nordgren 2 Con: Arthur Kay 2		Try: Taylor 2, Bruce Graham; Con: Roy Clark 2	Referee: Jack Donovan

=== Stormont Shield final ===
City's win was their first ever Stormont Shield title since its inception in 1925. The field was said to be in good order despite some heavy rain prior. The City forwards dominated the early stages with Ponsonby hard on defence. Ponsonby held out and worked to the City end and Arthur Kay opened the scoring with a penalty for Ponsonby. The City forwards went on the attack once more and Eugene Donovan was held up on the try line but got the ball away to lock Harold Gee who "dived over between the posts" with Albert Silva converting. City had an advantage in the scrums which was unsurprising with Hawea Mataira at prop and Bert Leatherbarrow at hooker. City won a penalty and Silva kicked it "from the widest of angles". Cunningham at halfback for City was getting many chances to get the backs going but the City inside backs, W. Cossey and Silva "were not certain in their handling". Ponsonby then made a big raid down the right wing with Kay and Len Jordan joining in "in a spectacular way". Dacre Black and Don Mullet were involved but Mullet dropped a low pass. City were penalised shortly after and Kay's penalty made the score 7-4. Just before halftime Cunningham sent the ball from a City scrum win to Silva who "raced past the Ponsonby inside backs, James was up in time for the pass, and sent the ball on to Harold Gee, who ran in to score by the flag". Halftime came with City leading 10-4. The second half began with the Ponsonby forwards storming to the City end but the City defence held up again. Then City went on the attack and "the outstanding player for City at this stage was the veteran Mataira, who threw out to his backs passes of extraordinary lengths". At one stage he made a 50 yard run "bumping off several tackling attempts". Ponsonby once again attacked strongly but still failed to register their first try and then City worked the ball to the Ponsonby end "when Mataira threw a long pass across, Silva getting the ball andkicking towards the wing. Both Taylor and Cossey raced for possession, and when Manley did not clear Cossey snapped up the ball, circled in and scored behind the posts" with Silva converting to give them a decisive 15-4 lead. Ponsonby attacked hard and a clearing kick found their fullback, Gordon Littlejohn who kicked a drop goal to make it 15-6. The play was still open but Ponsonby was too far behind to really challenge and then forward Don Mullett was injured and left the field. Ponsonby received a penalty and Kay kicked "an up and under" with Brian Nordgren coming in fast to gather the ball and score. Kay's conversion made it 15-11 giving them a faint chance but City was on the attack when the game finished shortly after. In comments about the game the New Zealand Herald wrote "Ponsonby was actually unlucky not to come out a winner... [they] appeared to score a try in the second spell, but the referee ruled that the player in possession, Travers Hardwick, lost the ball. On other occasions dropped passes [by Mullet], and then later after a brilliant opening by Kay, Fielder dropped the final pass two yards from the line cost tries. They also commented on the "excellence" of City's tackling and that Silva and Pouvi (Robert) Salaia "were outstanding with hard, low tackling". The standout players for City were Mataira "who was in every attack, being outstanding. Gee was not far behind, while James and Donovan played well. Cunningham, the substitute halfback, played an excellent game. being responsible for two tries". Warwick Clarke at fullback had an off day with his fielding "uncertain".

21 October	City	15-11 (10-4)	Ponsonby	Carlaw Park 1
3:00	Try: Harold Gee 2, W Cossey; Con: Albert Silva 2 Pen: Albert Silva		Try: Brian Nordgren; Con: Arthur Kay; Pen: Arthur Kay 2 Drop: Gordon Littlejohn	Referee: George Kelly

=== Top try scorers and point scorers ===
The try and point scoring lists were compiled from Fox Memorial, Roope Rooster, Phelan Shield, and Stormont Shield matches. Roy Nurse (Ponsonby) and Bernard Lowther (Richmond) were the leading try scorers with 15 tries. Nurse went on to represent New Zealand after the war while Lowther's son Bernie Lowther did the same in 1970. Bruce Graham (North Shore) scoring 12, as did Cliff Wellm (Otahuhu). Graham would also go on to represent New Zealand post-war. Basil Cranch (Mt Albert) finished with the most points once again with 92. Colin Riley of Otahuhu scored 80 and was also awarded a medal for being a top goal kicker. Prolific scorer Alan Donovan finished third with 76. There were however 2 matches that received no reported individual scoring. They were the match between Richmond and North Shore, won by Richmond 8-5 and Manukau's 29–10 win over Newton.

Top try scorers
Rk	Player	Team	Games	Tries
1	Roy Nurse	Ponsonby	21	15
2	Bernard Lowther	Richmond	20	15
3	Cliff Wellm	Otahuhu	10	12
4=	Bruce Graham	North Shore	21	11
4=	Jimmy Matthews	City	16	11
6=	Les Clement	Mount Albert	23	9
6=	Joe Murray	Manukau	15	9
8=	Basil Cranch	Mount Albert	20	8
8=	Ray Halsey	Otahuhu	22	8

Top point scorers
Rk	Player	Team	G	T	C	P	DG	Pts
1	Basil Cranch	Mount Albert	20	8	21	13	0	92
2	Colin Riley	Otahuhu	20	0	30	14	0	88
3	Alan Donovan	City	16	6	18	11	0	76
4	Morrie Brockliss	Marist	19	1	10	22	0	67
5	Bernard Lowther	Richmond	20	15	7	1	0	61
6	Roy Nurse	Ponsonby	21	15	3	1	0	53
7	Tom Butler	Manukau	18	7	11	4	0	51
8	Wilfred Dormer	Point Chevalier	12	1	4	17	0	45
9	J McArthur	North Shore	24	6	9	0	0	36
10	Cliff Wellm	Otahuhu	10	12	0	0	0	36

== Lower grades ==
There was no reserve grade competition run in 1944 as the senior clubs did not have the strength to field such sides. Despite no coverage of lower grade competitions the Ellerslie United club advertised the opponents and venue of their lower grade sides throughout the season and so the following lists of teams in those particular grades have been compiled. On October 21 Newton beat Point Chevalier 28–8 to win the third grade knockout competition. On the same day the Point Chevalier senior schoolboy side won the seven-a-side knockout competition which was at Carlaw Park. They were awarded a Bantam Rooster which had been taxidermied and was donated by C.P. Moore. It was mounted on a stand holding wooden footballs and the idea for it had come from the Roope Rooster competition. Eight teams were involved with the players weighing less than 5st 7lb. The fourth grade knockout final was won by Otahuhu when they defeated Ellerslie 15–8.

=== Senior B ===
Unknown if there was a senior B grade.

=== Second grade ===
Unknown if there was a second grade.

=== Third grade ===
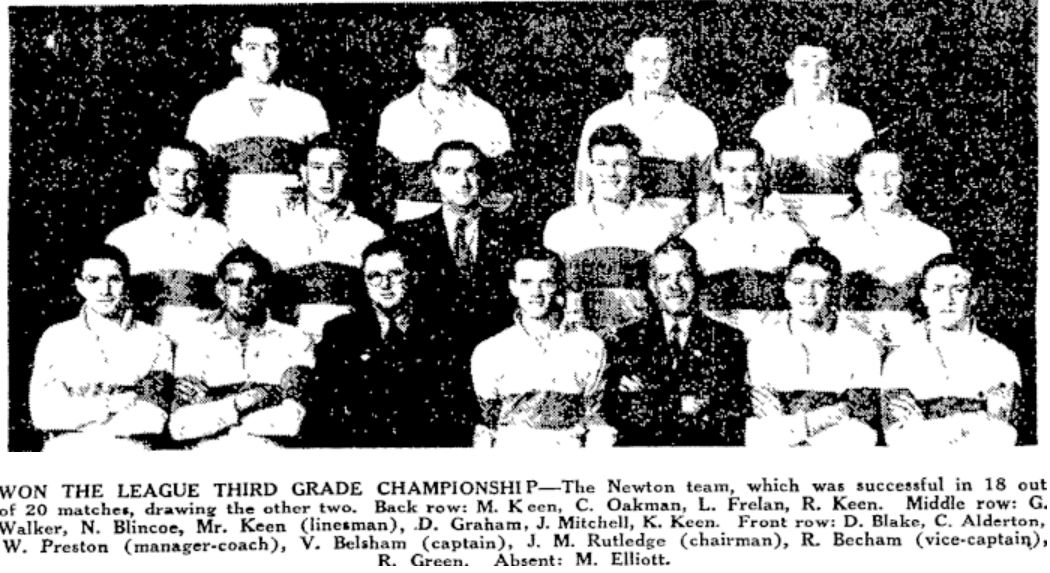
The Newton Rangers 3rd Grade champions.

Won by Newton Rangers. Newton also won the knockout final when they beat Point Chevalier 26 to 8 in the final on October 21. Other competing teams included: Ellerslie, Glenora, Green Lane, Mount Albert, Otahuhu, Point Chevalier, Richmond, City, and Ponsonby.

=== Fourth grade ===
Won by Ōtāhuhu Rovers. They also won the knockout competition when they beat Ellerslie 15-8 in the final on October 14. Other competing teams were: City, Ellerslie, Green Lane, Mount Albert, Newton, Point Chevalier, and Papakura

=== Fifth grade ===
Won by Mount Albert United A.

=== Sixth grade ===
Won by Point Chevalier and Richmond Rovers. Other competing teams included: Ellerslie, Newton, and Green Lane.

=== Seventh grade ===
Won by Marist Old Boys. Green Lane also competed in the competition.

=== Schoolboys ===
==== Seniors ====
Ellerslie, Green Lane, Mt Albert, Marist, Northcote, Otahuhu, and Richmond

==== Intermediate ====
Ellerslie, Green Lane, Marist, Mount Albert, Northcote

==== Junior ====
Ellerslie, Green Lane, Mount Albert, Otahuhu, Richmond

==== Seven-A-Side ====
Point Chevalier won the knockout competition and won a Bantam Rooster Trophy in the process.

== Representative season ==
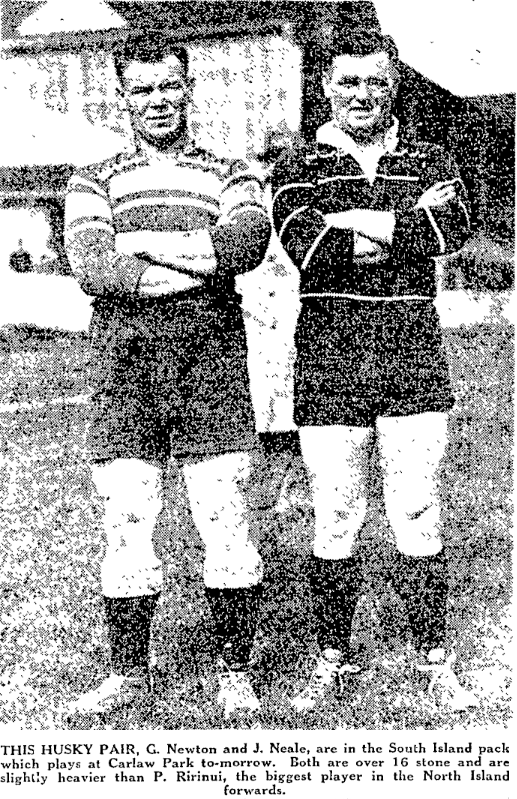

Auckland played 2 matches against South Auckland. Ralph Martin (Manukau), Ron McGregor (Richmond), F James (City), and Don McLeod (Marist) were the only players to play in both matches. It was planned during the season to play the West Coast and Wellington representative sides but they were unable to gather permits to travel on the railways in war time conditions. Auckland Pākehā and Auckland Māori played each other once again in a fixture that had become regular since 1936 when larger numbers of Māori players began playing in Auckland, thanks in particular to the Manukau club which recruited many Māori players from out of Auckland. Auckland Māori won which meant they had now won 6 of the matches, with Auckland Pākehā winning 4, and 2 draws. The other representative fixture played in Auckland was the North Island v South Island match which had not been played since 1939 due to the outbreak of war and difficulty of travel. Ten of the 13 North Island players were from Auckland.

=== Representative matches ===
==== Auckland v South Auckland (Waikato) ====
5 August	Auckland	36-5	South Auckland (Waikato)	Carlaw Park 1
3:00	Try: Pouvi (Robert) Salaia, Ron McGregor, Roy Nurse, Joe Murray 2, Ivan Sumich 2, John Rutherford, Dick Hull, W Rogers; Con: Ralph Martin 3		Try: Owen Brooks; Con: Owen Brooks	Referee: G Kelly

==== Auckland Māori v Auckland Pākehā ====
The match was ceremoniously kicked off by D. Gillett, the son of George A. Gillett. Proceeds of the game went to the Injured Players Fund with 360 pounds raised.

9 September	Auckland Māori	18-13	Auckland Pākehā	Carlaw Park 1
3:00	Try: A Taumata 2, A Rogers, Frank Hilton; Con: James Silva 2 Pen: James Silva		Try: Les Clement, Norm Johnson, Travers Hardwick; Con: Arnold Jones, Jack Magill	Referee: H Tate

==== North Island v South Island ====
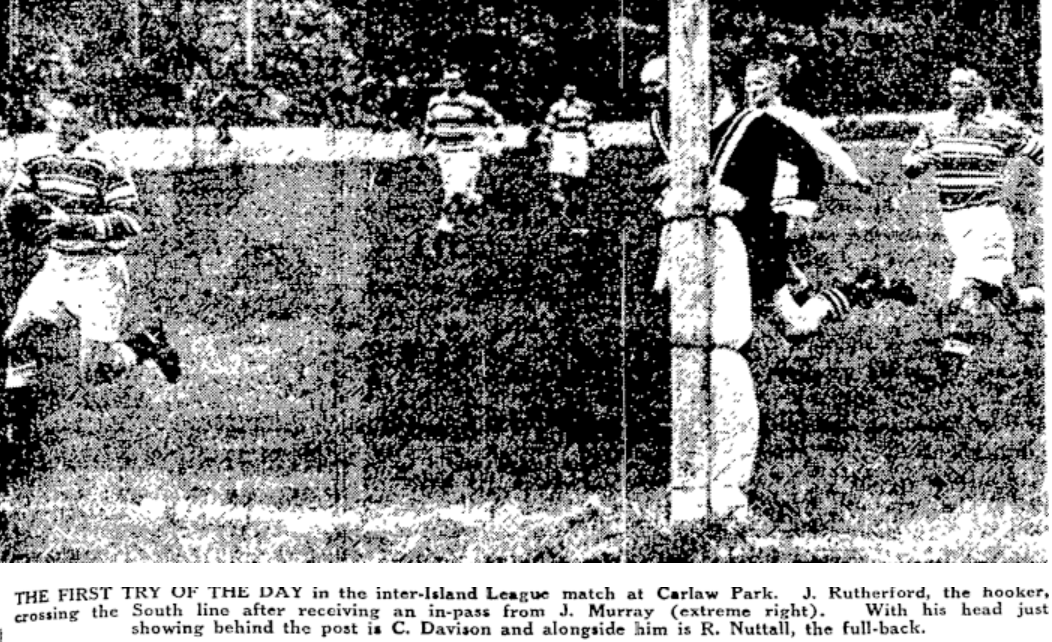

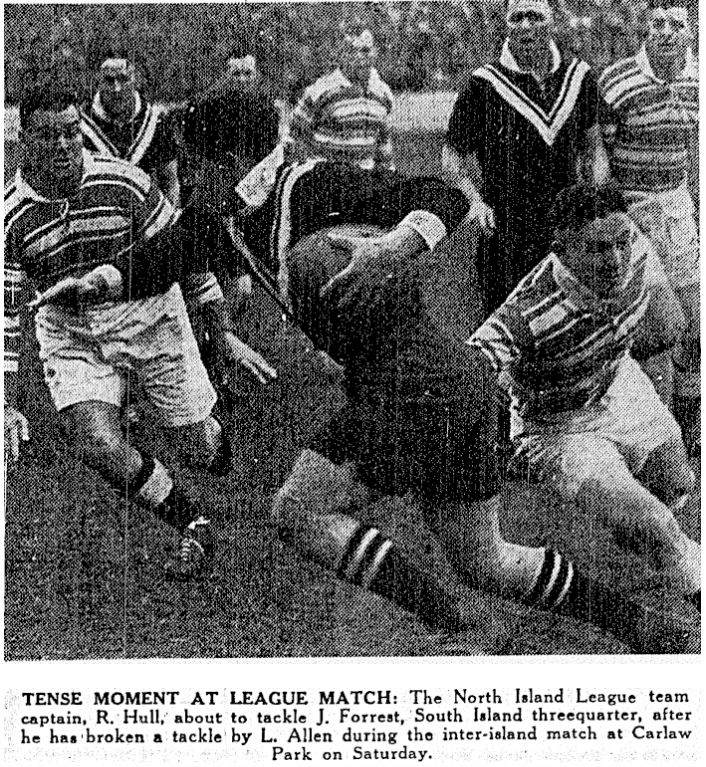

This was the first time since 1939 that the North Island v South Island match had been played. The North Island won comfortably scoring 9 tries to 3. The North Island side featured 10 players from the Auckland competition (Ralph Martin, Roy Nurse, Ron McGregor, Pouvi (Robert) Robert Salaia, Joe Murray, Dick Hull, John Rutherford, Pita Ririnui, Fred James, and A Rogers). Hawea Mataira had originally been selected but was travelling to Wellington with the Auckland Waterside Workers team to play in their annual fixture with Wellington Waterside and was replaced by Ririnui. Owen Brooks of Waikato had a field day, scoring 3 tries and kicking 8 conversions from 9 attempts.

16 September	North Island	43-15	South Island	Carlaw Park 1
3:00	Try: Pouvi (Robert) Salaia, Owen Brooks 3, Joe Murray 3, John Rutherford, Fred James; Con: Owen Brooks 8		Try: John Newton 2, P Smith; Con: Ces Davison 3	Referee: J O'Shannessey

==== South Auckland (Waikato) v Auckland ====
Auckland fielded a slightly weaker side as North Shore, Newton, Ponsonby, and Mount Albert were all playing in the Roope Rooster semi finals so their players were unavailable for selection.

7 October	South Auckland (Waikato)	12-10	Auckland	Davies Park, Huntly
3:15	Try: S Griffiths, L Allen; Con: Owen Brookes; Pen: Owen Brookes 2		Try: J Smith, Ron McGregor; Con: Colin Riley; Pen: Colin Riley	Referee: F Knapper

=== Auckland matches played and scorers ===
No	Name	Club Team	Play	Tries	Con	Pen	Points
1	Ralph Martin	Manukau	2	0	3	0	6
1	Ron McGregor	Richmond	2	2	0	0	6
1	Joe Murray	Manukau	1	2	0	0	6
4	Colin Riley	Otahuhu	1	0	1	1	4
5	Pouvi (Robert) Salaia	City	1	1	0	0	3
5	Roy Nurse	Ponsonby	1	1	0	0	3
5	John Rutherford	North Shore	1	1	0	0	3
5	Dick Hull	Ponsonby	1	1	0	0	3
5	A Rogers	Manukau	1	1	0	0	3
5	J Smith	Marist	1	1	0	0	3
11	Fred James	City	2	0	0	0	0
11	Don McLeod	Marist	2	0	0	0	0
11	Les Clement	Mount Albert	1	0	0	0	0
11	R Seymour	Richmond	1	0	0	0	0
11	B Taylor	City	1	0	0	0	0
11	W Cossey	City	1	0	0	0	0
11	C Williams	Richmond	1	0	0	0	0
11	Owen Hughes	Otahuhu	1	0	0	0	0
11	Frank Hilton	Richmond	1	0	0	0	0
11	Norm Johnson	Otahuhu	1	0	0	0	0
11	A Rogers	Manukau	1	0	0	0	0
11	Ivan Sumich	Mt Albert	1	0	0	0	0

=== Auckland Māori (Tāmaki) matches played and scorers ===
No	Name	Club Team	Play	Tries	Con	Pen	Points
1	A Silva	City	1	0	2	1	6
1	A Taumata	Manukau	1	2	0	0	6
3	A Rogers	Manukau	1	1	0	0	3
3	Frank Hilton	Richmond	1	1	0	0	3
5	Reg Martin	Manukau	1	0	0	0	0
5	Pouvi (Robert) Salaia	City	1	0	0	0	0
5	E Opai	Manukau	1	0	0	0	0
5	Joe Murray	Manukau	1	0	0	0	0
5	Jack Major	Manukau	1	0	0	0	0
5	George Shilton	Manukau	1	0	0	0	0
5	Hawea Mataira	City	1	0	0	0	0
5	Wiremu Te Tai	Manukau	1	0	0	0	0
5	Pita Ririnui	Manukau	1	0	0	0	0

=== Auckland Pākehā matches played and scorers ===
No	Name	Club Team	Play	Tries	Con	Pen	Points
1	Les Clement	Mount Albert	1	1	0	0	3
1	Norm Johnson	Otahuhu	1	1	0	0	3
1	Travers Hardwick	Ponsonby	1	1	0	0	3
4	Jack Magill	Richmond	1	0	1	0	2
4	Arnold Jones	Mount Albert	1	0	1	0	2
6	Roy Nurse	Ponsonby	1	0	0	0	0
6	Ron McGregor	Richmond	1	0	0	0	0
6	Don McLeod	Marist	1	1	0	0	0
6	J Smith	Marist	1	0	0	0	0
6	Ivan Sumich	Mount Albert	1	0	0	0	0
6	John Rutherford	North Shore	1	0	0	0	0
6	Dick (R.R.) Hull	Ponsonby	1	0	0	0	0
6	Fred James	City	1	0	0	0	0

=== Fourth Grade representative side ===
On July 26 the following fourth grade representative side was selected to play the South Auckland fourth grade representatives at Carlaw Park on August 5:- W. Harris, A. Speedy, W. Wright, Streeton, Philp (Otahuhu), Gwilliam, D. Shaw (Newton), P. Roberts, D Greacen, F. Chapman, G. Chapman (Ellerslie), G. Clark, L. Cook, Donnelley (Papakura), Anderson, and Somers (Point Chevalier).

== Club news ==
=== Auckland Rugby League Junior Control Board ===
They held their annual meeting in the League Rooms, Courthouse Lane on Tuesday, April 4 at 8 pm. Their honorary secretary was W.F. Clarke.

=== Auckland Rugby League School Control Board ===
The School Control Board held their annual meeting on Monday, March 27 at 7:30 pm at the League Rooms, Courthouse Lane. Their honorary secretary was L. Rout. It was reported that Thomas Briton Carey was killed in action on August 20, 1944. He was aged just 22. He had served for ten months with the New Zealand Expeditionary force in the Pacific. He then returned to New Zealand and transferred to the Air Force. Carey joined the 35th (mixed) Battalion in the Second Expeditionary Force. He was on a flight returning from Fiji to New Zealand which was lost, missing at sea. Carey had been educated in Auckland and was a rugby league player, representing Auckland schoolboy representatives many times as their captain. He is memorialised at the Bourail Memorial, Bourail New Zealand War Cemetery, New Caledonia.

=== Auckland Rugby League Referees Association ===
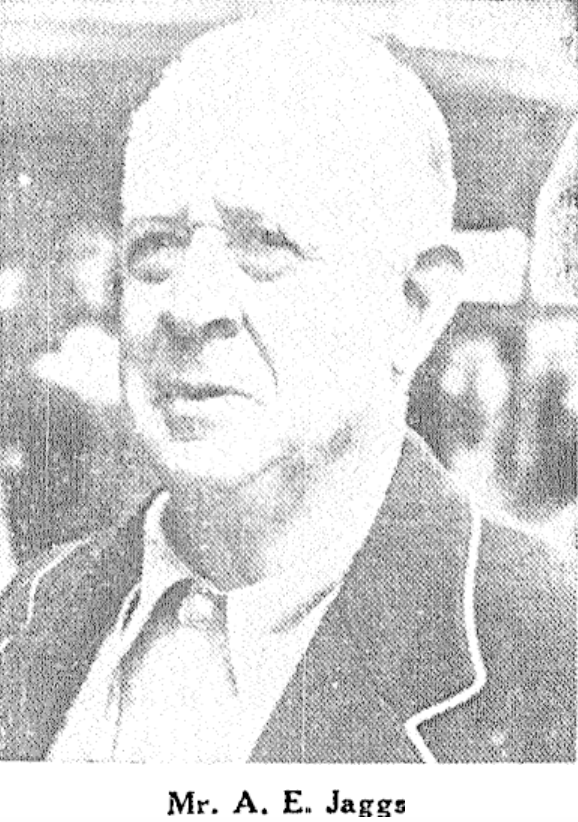

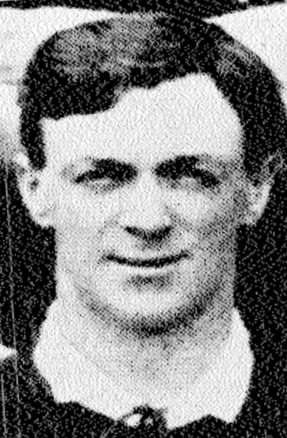
Maurice Wetherill

On April 27 Mr. Alfred Ernest Jaggs of Clarement Street, off Khyber Parr Road died at the age of 68. He was a football player who after retiring from playing refereed rugby union and rugby league. He refereed 3 first grade games in the 1911 and 1912 seasons and the representative match between Auckland and Hawke's Bay on 19 August 1911. He was buried at Waikumete Cemetery. The following were appointed as officers on the school control board: chairman, Maurice Wetherill; secretary-chairman, Mr. V. Rose; secretary, Mr. L. Rout; board members, Messrs, J. Silva, W. Moore, J. Hanlon. E. Te Bhurt, A. Lennie, referees' delegate, Mr. J. Cottingham.

=== Avondale League Football Club ===
Avondale League Football Club held their annual meeting on April 27 in the Labour Party Rooms on Georges Road, Avondale at 8 pm. Their honorary secretary was H.W. Green. On August 19 the Priaulx family (parents Alfred Mansell Priaulx and Lydia Priaulx) thanked the Avondale rugby league club for their messages of sympathy after the loss of their only son (Roy Leslie Priaulx) who was killed in action in the war. Roy died on July 26, 1944, in Italy. He was buried at Florence War Cemetery, Italy. He is memorialised at the Auckland War Memorial Museum in the World War 2 Hall of Memories.

=== City Rovers ===
City Rovers advertised for a practice for "all players and intending players, seniors, 3rd and 4th grades" for Saturday, March 25. Their honorary secretary was E.A. Girven. Their chairman was George Hunt. During their round 11 match with Richmond, Eugene Donovan was sent off for referee abuse and ordered to apologise to the referee. He failed to do so and was suspended as a result. The City club protested by refusing to play their match with Manukau the following week.

=== Ellerslie United ===
The Ellerslie United Rugby League Club held their annual meeting at the Parish Hall on Monday 13 March at 7:30 pm. Their honorary secretary was G. Whaley. They held a practice at the Ellerslie Reserve on Good Friday, April 7 for all grades. The Auckland Rugby League decided at the May 31 meeting to hold a senior match at Ellerslie on June 17 at the Ellerslie Domain which is the present day ground of the Ellerslie Eagles.

=== Glenora Rugby League Club ===
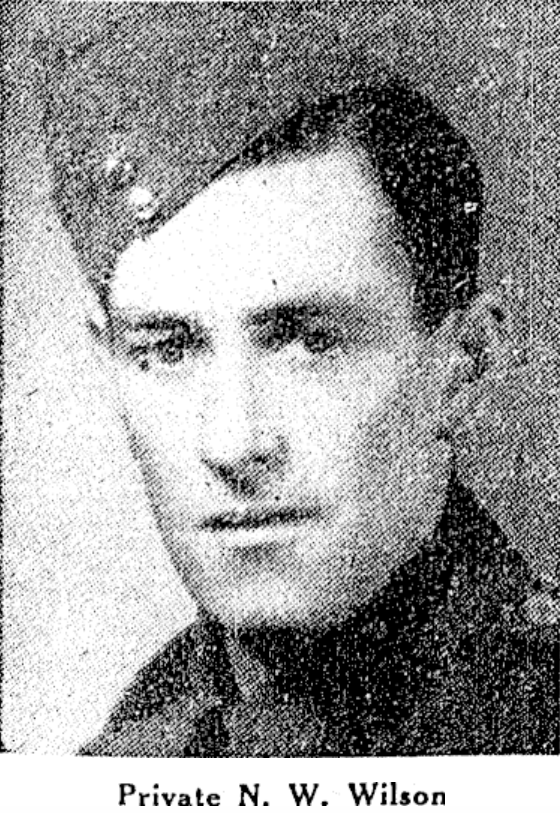

On March 16 it was reported in the New Zealand Herald that Norman William Wilson was lost at sea on 17 August 1942. He had been a prisoner of war and was being transported on the Nino Bixio ship which was taking prisoners from North Africa to Italy when it was torpedoed. He had been part of the 2nd N.Z.E.F. and in the Infantry Brigade at the time of his capture. Wilson was the son of Charles Wilson and Mary Wilson (née Jenkins) of 56 Methuen Road in Avondale. He had been educated at Glen Eden School and played rugby league for Glenora for a number of years. Wilson was a storeman and living in Henderson when he enlisted. He is memorialised at the Alamein Memorial, El Alamein War Cemetery in Egypt, the Oratia District School War Memorial Gates on Shaw Road, and the Auckland War Memorial Museum, WW2 Hall of Memories.

On March 31 Glenora Rugby League Football Club advertised for a training for all teams at the Glen Eden Football Grounds. Their secretary was G. Malam. At the May 31 meeting the Glenora club requested that a senior match be played in Glen Eden.

=== Green Lane Rugby League Football Club ===
Green Lane Rugby League Club held their annual meetining at the Fire Brigade Hall on Wednesday, March 15 at 8 pm. Their secretary was W. Leitch.

=== Manukau Rugby League Football Club ===
Manukau Rugby League Football Club held their annual meeting on Thursday, March 2 at 7:45 pm in the Labour Party's Rooms, by the Strand Theatre, Queen St., Onehunga. Their honorary secretary was H. De Wolfe. They held a meeting for players and intending players at Carlaw Park at 9:30 am on Friday, April 7 for all grades.

Manukau held a meeting on October 16 to discuss their upcoming trip to Tauranga.

=== Marist Brothers Old Boys ===
The Marist Brothers Old Boys League Football Club held their annual meeting at the Rugby League Rooms on Courthouse Lane, on Tuesday, March 14. Their honorary secretary was Jack Kirwan. Marist held a meeting for all junior and schoolboy players at Vermont Street School on Tuesday, March 21 at 7:45 pm.

=== Mount Albert Rugby League Club ===
The Mount Albert Rugby League Social Club advertised a social event for February 19 at the St. George's Hall in Kingsland featuring modern and old time music, "Monte Carlo and Supper". Their honorary secretary was Mr. J. Wood. The Mount Albert Rugby League Football Club held their annual meeting at their club rooms at Fowlds Park in Morningside on Monday, March 13 at 8 pm. Their honorary secretary was P.W. Clement. Mount Albert advertised for a practice for all grades at Fowlds Park on Saturday, March 25 at 2 pm. They advertised for another practice for all grades on Saturday, April 1 at 2 pm at "ground, Springleigh Avenue, off Woodward Road, Mount Albert. The Mount Albert Borough Council advised the league that use of the Phyllis Street Reserve had been granted to the Auckland Hockey Association. The Borough Council also referred to the provision of dressing accommodation at Fowlds Park and that a conference of all sports bodies would be held regarding the question.

=== Newton Rangers ===
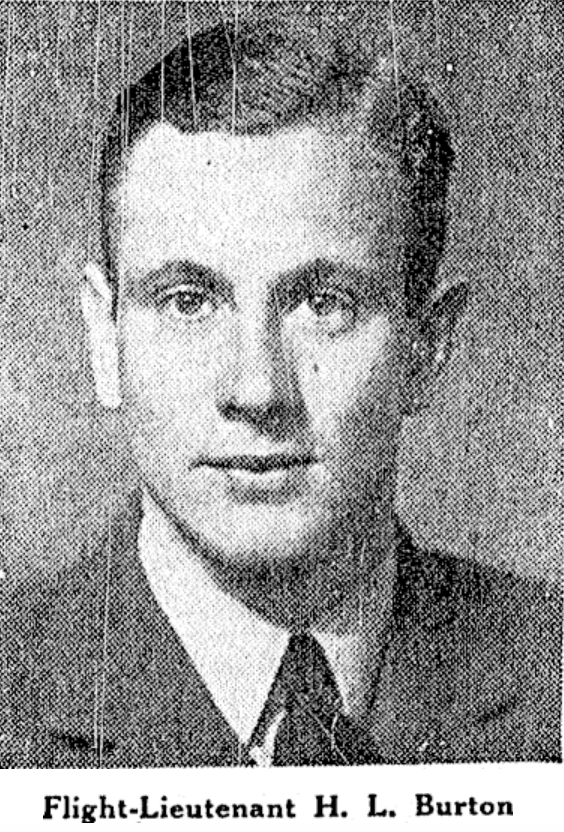
Harry Leonard Burton

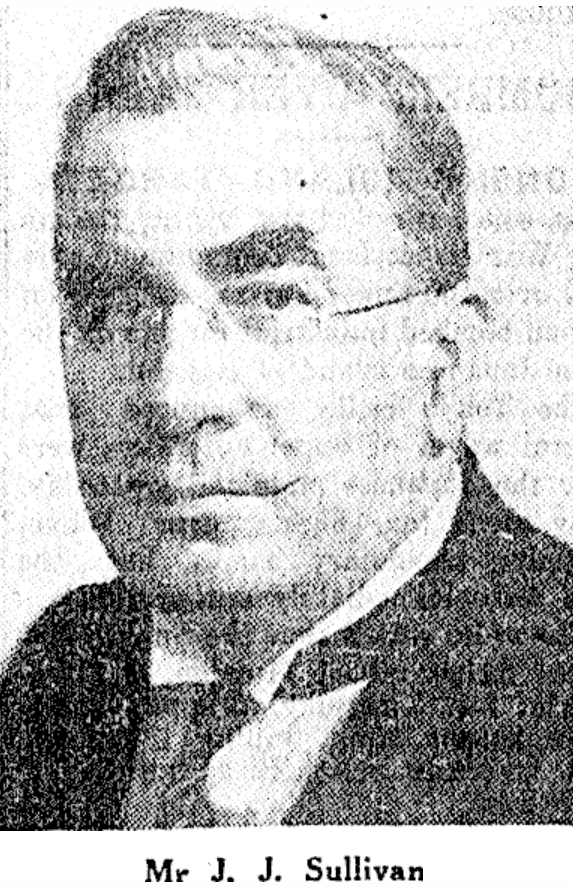

The Newton Rangers Rugby League Football Club held their annual meeting at the Auckland Rugby League rooms on Courthouse Lane, on Monday March 13 at 7.30pm. Their honorary secretary was J.A. MacKinnon. Newton advertised for a general practice of all grades at Carlaw Park on Saturday, April 1 at "2.30 pm. Sharp". And that weekly training would be on Tuesday and Thursday. In September it was reported that Harry Leonard Burton had won the Distinguished Flying Cross award for gallantry in action. He had played for the Newton seniors in 1940 and 1941. On December 13 the well known barrister, Mr. Jeremiah James Sullivan collapsed and died during a trial at the Auckland Supreme Court. He had previously represented the Newton club on the Auckland Rugby League.

=== North Shore Albions ===
It was reported in the Auckland Star on March 7 that North Shore player Jack Smith (Charles Ernest Smith, though better known as Jack) had kicked a penalty goal in the Second N.Z.E.F. rugby teams win over the Rest of Egypt 9–7 in Alexandria.

The North Shore club was granted permission to charge 1 shilling for each person attending the round 16 match at the Devonport Domain on August 19. All funds raised would be given to the Devonport 1944 Patriotic Funds.

=== Northcote and Birkenhead Ramblers Football Club ===
The Northcote club only fielded a single team in the intermediate schools competition.

=== Otahuhu Rovers Rugby League Club ===
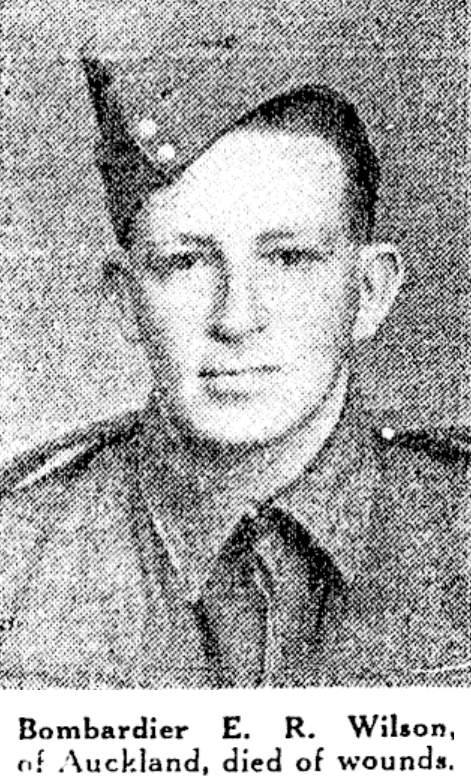

On February 29 the Auckland Star reported that Lance-Bombardier, Ernest Reginald Wilson had died on 9 February 1944 from wounds while fighting in the Battle of Monte Cassino. He left New Zealand for service in 1941 with the second N.Z.E.F. and was with the 14 Light Anti Aircraft Regiment when killed. Wilson was the youngest son of Mrs. M.A. Wilson of 20 Symonds Street, Auckland and Mr. T. Wilson of Scotland. He had been educated at Epsom School and Seddon Memorial Technical College. Wilson was a member of the Otahuhu rugby league club and the Otahuhu baseball team and was a canister maker by trade. He was single when he enlisted and was survived by his mother Mary Alice Wilson, originally of Cessnock, New South Wales, Australia but living at 20 Symonds Street at the time of his death. Wilson was aged 24 when killed and was buried at Cassino War Cemetery, Italy. He is memorialised at the Auckland War Memorial Museum, WW2 Hall of Memories.

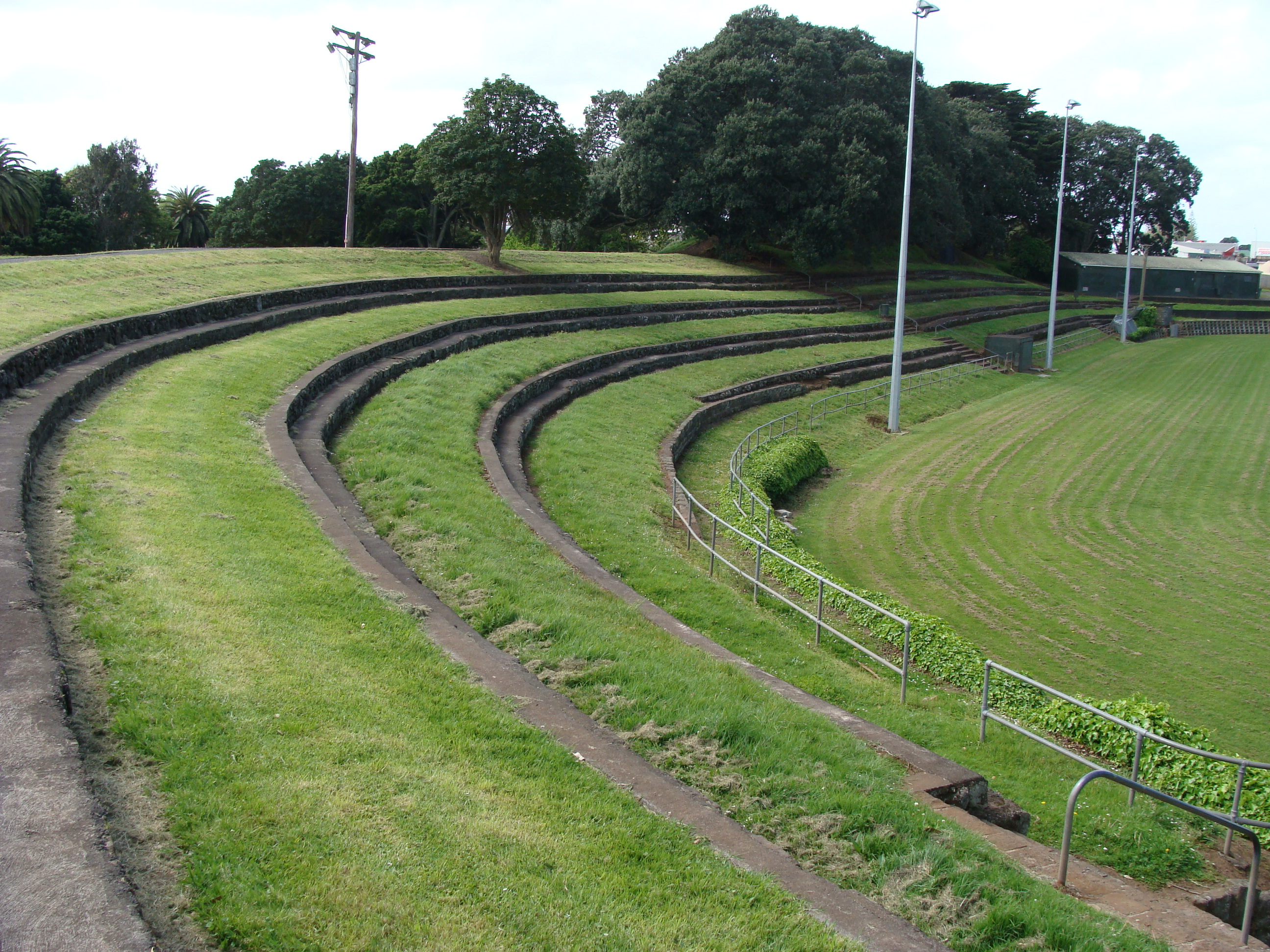
Sturges Park, Otahuhu

Otahuhu Rovers Rugby League Club held their annual general meeting at their club rooms on Fairburn Road in Ōtāhuhu on March 13 at 7:30 pm. Their honorary secretary was M. Ritchie. At the first board of control meeting for the year it was decided to play Otahuhu's second preliminary match at Sturges Park in Otahuhu to raise money for "patriotic purposes". At the board meeting on June 7 a letter was received from the Otahuhu club "stating it felt that the time had come when they should make an effort to obtain a fair share of Sturges Park in Ōtāhuhu. It was felt that an inquiry coming from the ruling body would carry more weight than a request from the club. It was the intention, in the event of having the use of the park, to apply for a senior match, or matches, to be played there later in the season. It was decided to take the matter up with the Ōtāhuhu Borough Council". The Otahuhu Borough council wrote a letter stating that Sturges Park was let for the duration of the war to the Auckland Rugby Union. On June 22 the control board gave Otahuhu permission to send a team of schoolboys to Christchurch in August provided "satisfactory travel arrangements were made".

=== Papakura Rugby League Football Club ===
The Papakura Rugby League Football Club held their annual general meeting on Monday, March 13 at 8 pm in the Papakura Scout Hut. Mr. A. L. Lewis was their honorary secretary. In early December Papakura held a function in the club rooms on Union Street. The president, Mr. Les McVeigh presided over the large attendance. He mentioned that the club was now in its fourteenth year of playing football and that they had "provided no less than 80 members for the forces".

=== Pt. Chevalier Rugby League Football Club ===
Point Chevalier Rugby League Football Club held their annual meeting will be held in the Social and Sports Club Hall at 417 Pt Chevalier Road on Monday 20 March at 7:30 pm. Their honorary secretary was A.G. Daniels.

=== Ponsonby United Rugby League Club ===
Ponsonby United Rugby League Club held their annual meeting at the Leys Institute on February 28 at 7:30 pm. Their honorary secretary was Mr. J. Davidson. They advertised a practice for all grades to be held at Grey Lynn Park on Sunday, March 12 at 9 am. They also requested that "men who are prepared to coach any grade are invited along". Ponsonby was given permission to travel to Bennydale in the King Country to play a game on October 28. In October it was reported that Pilot Officer William Thomas (aged 20) had won his commission in Canada. He was a member of the Ponsonby senior side and had left New Zealand last February.

=== Richmond Rovers ===
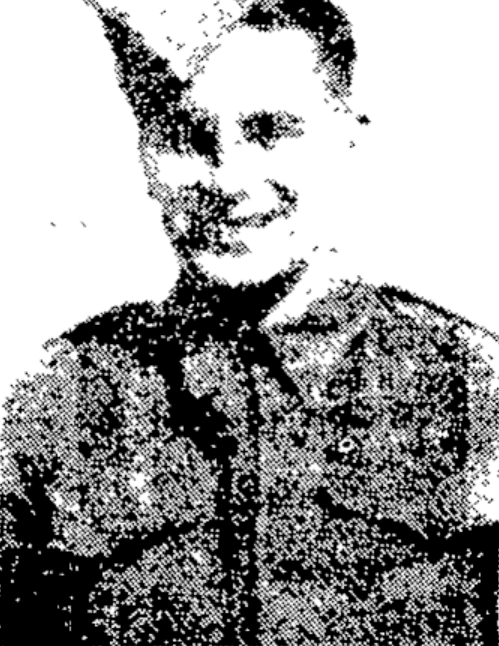
Mervyn Jack Jarvis

It was reported in the Auckland Star on 18 February that Sergeant Mervyn Jack Jarvis was reportedly killed in action. He had enlisted in 1940 and trained in Australia before travelling to the Middle East. He served in the Eight Army and had been wounded in 1942. His death occurred on December 2, 1943, whilst he was part of the 24 Infantry Battalion. Jarvis attended Seddon Memorial Technical College and was a playing member of the Richmond club. He had transferred from the Marist sixth grade B team to Richmond 2nd grade in 1936. He played for the Richmond reserve grade side in 1939 and 1940. He was survived by his parents Mr Stephen Frederick Jarvis and Mrs Agnes Dorothy Jarvis who he had been living with at 27 Moa Road, Point Chevalier, along with brothers Ken and Richard. Mervyn was 28 at the time of his death and buried at the Sangro River War Cemetery in Italy. Ken and another brother, Les, were also fighting and their mother, Agnes was involved in the effort at home. He is remembered in the Auckland War Memorial Museum's Hall of Memories. His parents and brothers wrote memoriam notes which were published in the Auckland Star the following year.

Richmond Rovers Football Club advertised for a "general practice" to be held at Grey Lynn Park on Saturday, March 25. Their honorary secretary was W.R. Dick. The senior side was captained by Leo Davis.

== Transfers and registrations ==
At 3 May board of control meeting the following transfer of players to senior clubs was approved; J. Matthews (Marist to City), I. Te Weti (City to Marist), Robert Grotte (City to Ponsonby), R. Humphries (Avondale 4th grade to North Shore), W.C.S. Miller (Mt Albert to Pt. Chevalier), A. Potter (Newton to Pt. Chevalier). The South Auckland Rugby League notified that the following players had been transferred to Auckland Rugby League; W.L. Werohia, N. Dowling, and T. Shaw. Richmond requested that Owen Payne he regraded from senior to first junior as, despite playing several senior games the previous season he only weighed 9 stone 4 pounds and had no intention of playing senior grade this season. W. Woods of City was also regraded to first junior.

At the May 10 meeting E. Neale of the Richmond senior team was graded to first junior. The following transfers were approved:- R. Hodge (Manukau seniors), William Bridger, Owen Charles Elliott (Newton seniors), J. Mills (Otahuhu seniors).

At the May 17 meeting the following players were registered:- F.S. Wells (Point Chevalier), Thomas John Kerr (Newton), Walter Bidois (Newton), Jim J. Fogarty (Otahuhu), Melville Halford Middleton (Otahuhu), and James William Russell Mitchell (Point Chevalier).

At the May 24 meeting the following transfers were approved:- G Carey (Richmond to Mount Albert seniors), J Sullivan (Ponsonby to Newton seniors), D.A. Hutchinson (City to Newton seniors), G. Montgomery (Mount Albert 3rd grade to Point Chevalier seniors). The following players were registered:- J.J.H. Harding (Point Chevalier), T.H. Wakefield (City), Cecil Henry Blincoe (Point Chevalier), R.G. Kidd (Marist), G.G. Smith (Marist), A.S. Byers (Point Chevalier).

At the May 31 board meeting the following players were granted transfers:- Ernie Pinches (Mount Albert to Richmond seniors), Cyril Henry Bloomfield Wiberg (Marist to Mount Albert seniors), C.S. Clarke (Marist to Mount Albert seniors), J.F. Scarlett (Richmond to Manukau seniors), Reginald Carl Martin (Otahuhu to Manukau seniors). The following players were registered:- Ernie Pinches (Richmond), G. Davidson (Newton), J. Hapeta (Newton), P.W. Caddick (North Shore), and C.S. Clarke (Mount Albert).

The June 7 board meeting saw the following players registered :- R. Towgood (Pt Chevalier), Francis William Goffin (Point Chevalier), and Reginald Carl Martin (Manukau).

At the June 14 meeting Harold Raymond Gee was granted a transfer from Mount Albert to City. While G. Cunningham was registered with City seniors and W.A.J. Grove with Point Chevalier seniors.

On June 21 C.S. Clarke was granted a transfer from Mount Albert to City, T. Waihi from Ponsonby to Newton, G. Te Haara from City to Newton, and T. Tonga from Ngāruawāhia to Manukau. The following players were registered:- Derek Hudson Hardwick (Ponsonby), C.J. Honey (Ponsonby), B. Gallagher (Newton), G.C. Sorby (Newton), F.J. Pritchard (North Shore), and J.C. Gurnick (Newton).

On June 28 Aubrey Thompson of Manukau was granted a transfer to the Richmond club. The following players were registered:- W. Rogers (Manukau), H. Cassidy (Newton).

On July 5 W.F. Bicknell was registered with Point Chevalier, and J.H. Catterall was also registered with Point Chevalier.

On July 12 H Brady was cleared to play for Otahuhu after previously having played for Newton. Colin Cowley was granted a transfer from Mount Albert to Richmond, and L. Pinfold from Richmond to Mount Albert.

On July 26 H. Te Weri asked for a transfer from Marist to Mount Albert as he had not been selected for 5 weeks and desired to play for a club in a lower position.

At the August 16 meeting John Anderson was granted a transfer from Marist to Point Chevalier, although he requested to be transferred back around the same time and was granted a transfer at the beginning of the 1944 season. Anderson was a New Zealand representative and one of the most prolific point scorers in Auckland club rugby league history. W. Briggs was also granted a transfer from Ponsonby to Newton. The following players were registered:- K.H. May (North Shore), A. Puriri (Manukau), R. Neil (Newton), J. Porter (Newton), G. Parahi (Manukau).

At the August 23 meeting D. Muru's registration with Newton was approved, as was A.J. Hogan's with Point Chevalier, and G.A. Woolley's with Newton.

On August 30 P.A. Maconaghie was registered with North Shore, F. Cocks with Ponsonby, T. Pokawa with Manukau, and M.C. Smith with Newton.

On September 6 D. Walker was granted a transfer from Richmond to Point Chevalier. D. Tate was registered with North Shore.

On September 27 the following transfers were approved:- W.G. Simpson from City to Otahuhu, and William George Davidson from Newton to Marist. The following were registered:- G.J. Blake (Point Chevalier), Arthur L. Read (North Shore), C. Lane (Mount Albert), G. Mitchell (Newton), H.J. Walker (North Shore), and J.W. Priest (North Shore).

On October 14 the following player was registered:- Hubert (Bob) James Borich with Mount Albert. The application of John Anderson from Pt Chevalier to Marist, and Leo R. Davis from Richmond to Mount Albert were deferred until next season.
