= 1922 in New Zealand =

- Decades: 1900s; 1910s; 1920s; 1930s; 1940s
- See also: History of New Zealand; List of years in New Zealand; Timeline of New Zealand history

The following lists events that happened during 1922 in New Zealand.

== Incumbents ==
=== Regal and viceregal ===
- Head of State – George V
- Governor-General – John Jellicoe, Viscount Jellicoe
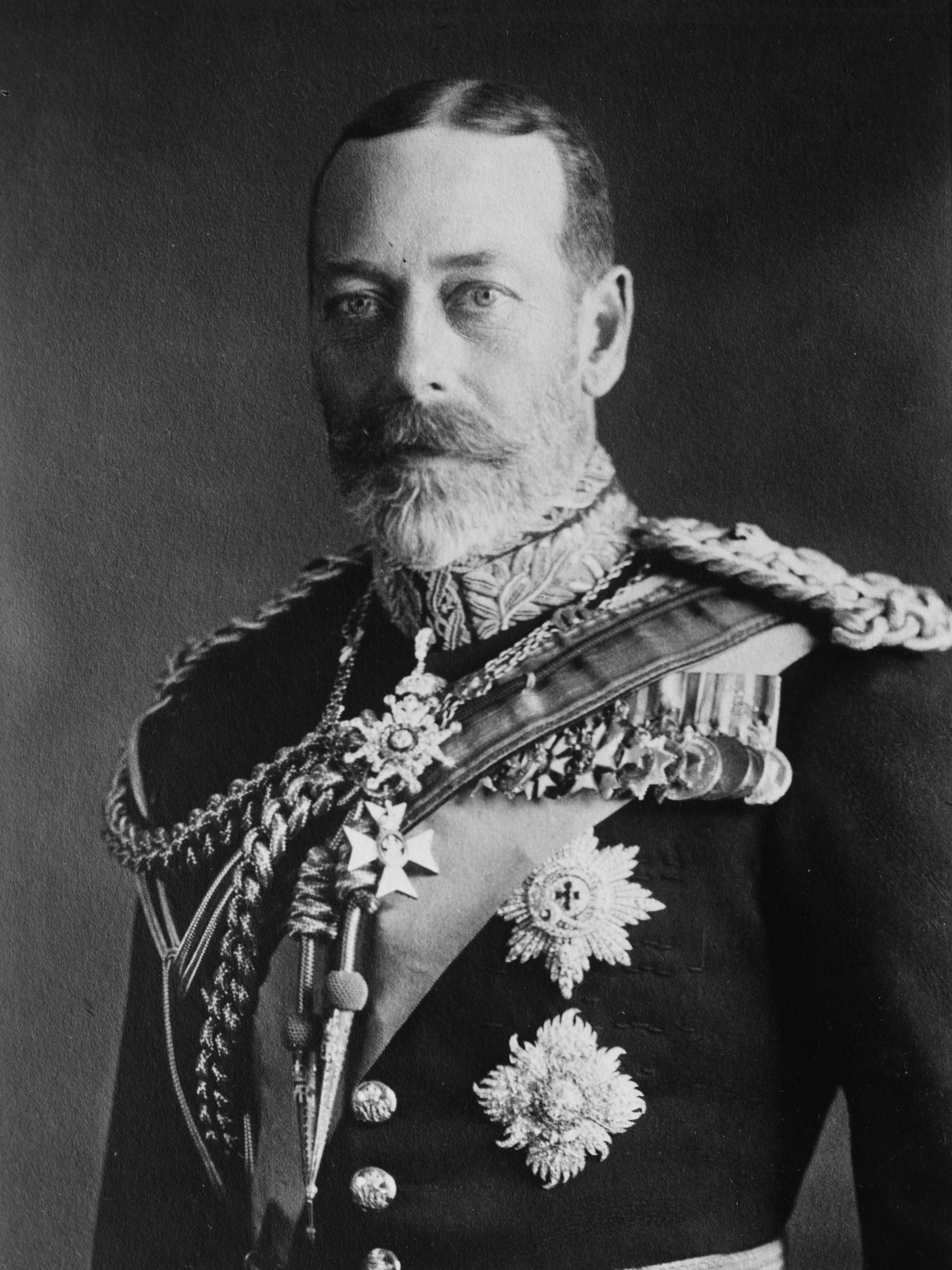
George V

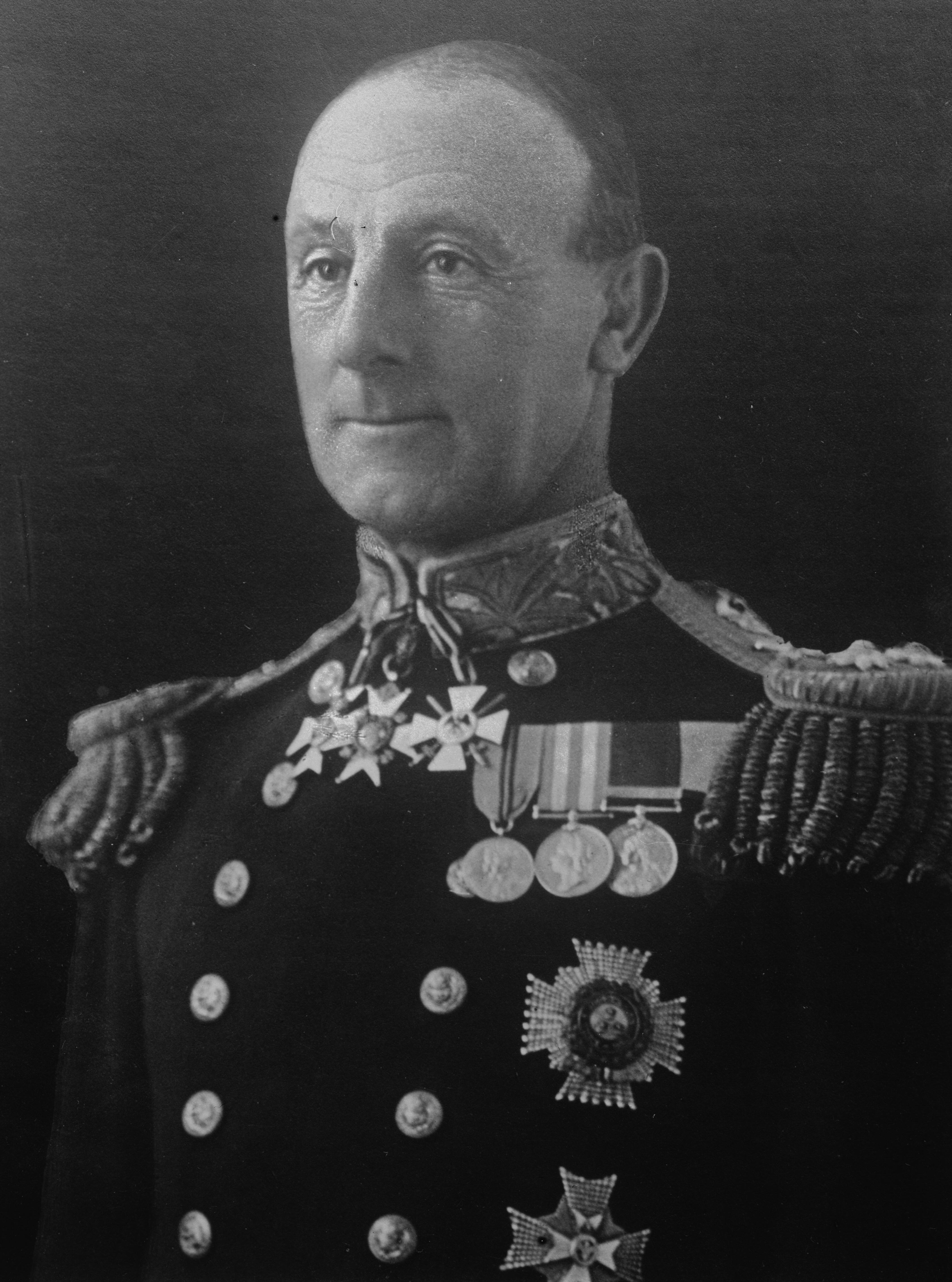
Viscount Jellicoe

=== Government ===
The 20th New Zealand Parliament concludes. The general election held in December sees the Reform Party lose its majority and need to negotiate for support with Independents and two Liberal Party MPs to remain in government.

- Speaker of the House – Frederick Lang
- Prime Minister – William Massey
- Minister of Finance – William Massey
- Minister of External Affairs – Ernest Lee
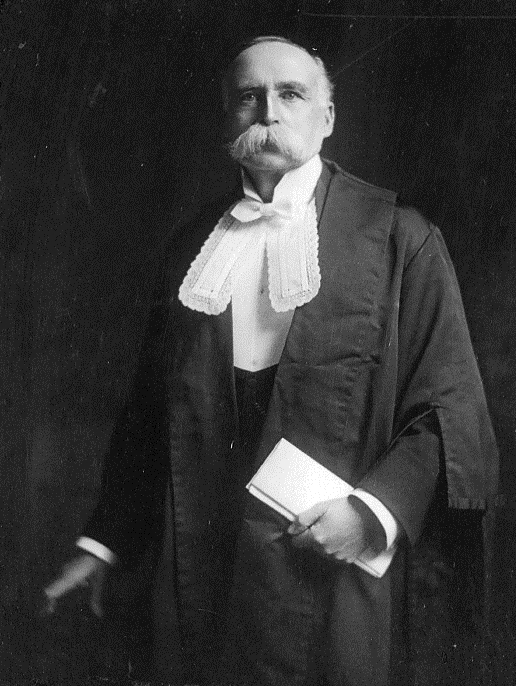
Frederic Lang

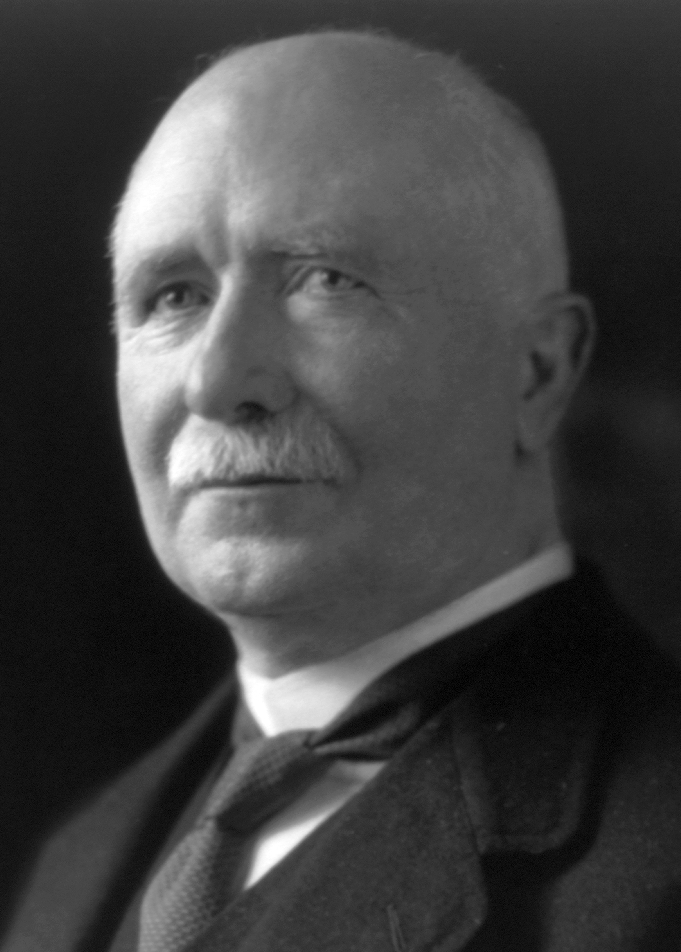
William Massey

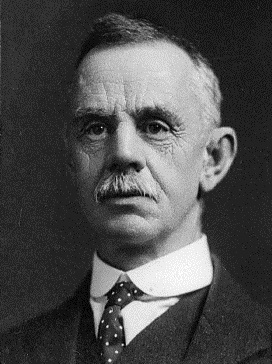
Ernest Lee

=== Parliamentary opposition ===
- Leader of the Opposition – Thomas Wilford (Liberal Party)
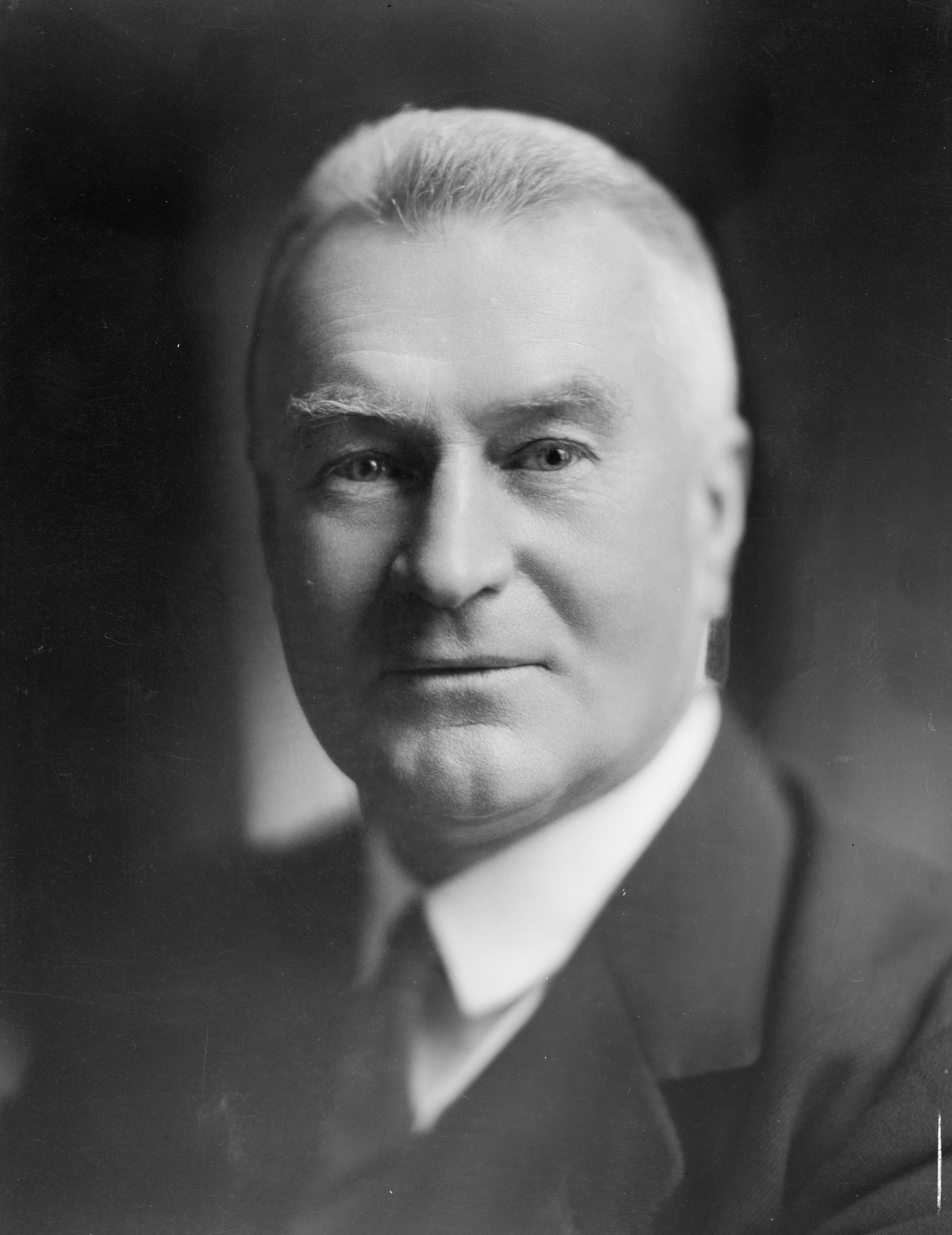
Thomas Wilford

=== Judiciary ===
- Chief Justice – Sir Robert Stout
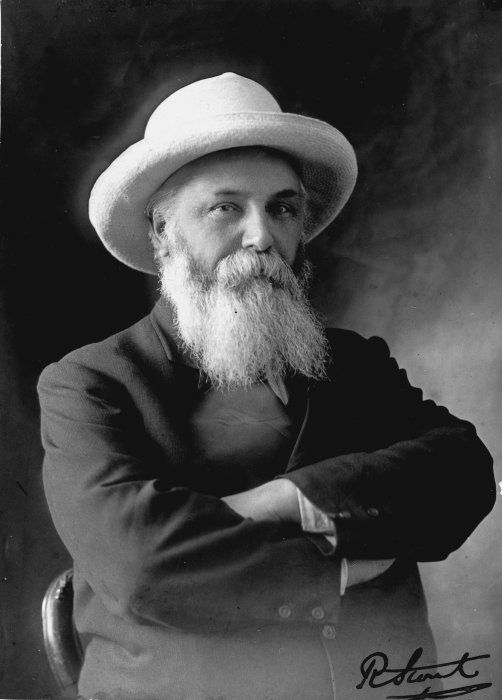
Robert Stout

=== Main centre leaders ===
- Mayor of Auckland – James Gunson
- Mayor of Wellington – Robert Wright
- Mayor of Christchurch – Henry Thacker
- Mayor of Dunedin – James Douglas
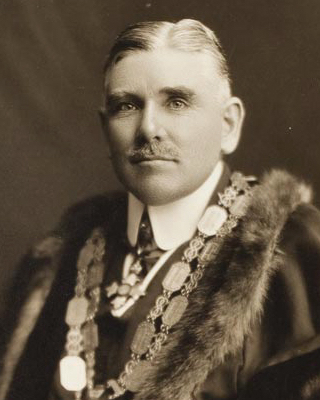
James Gunson

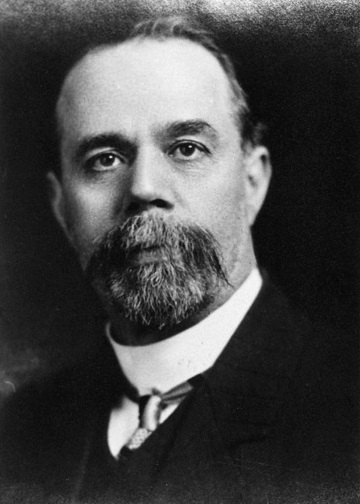
Robert Wright

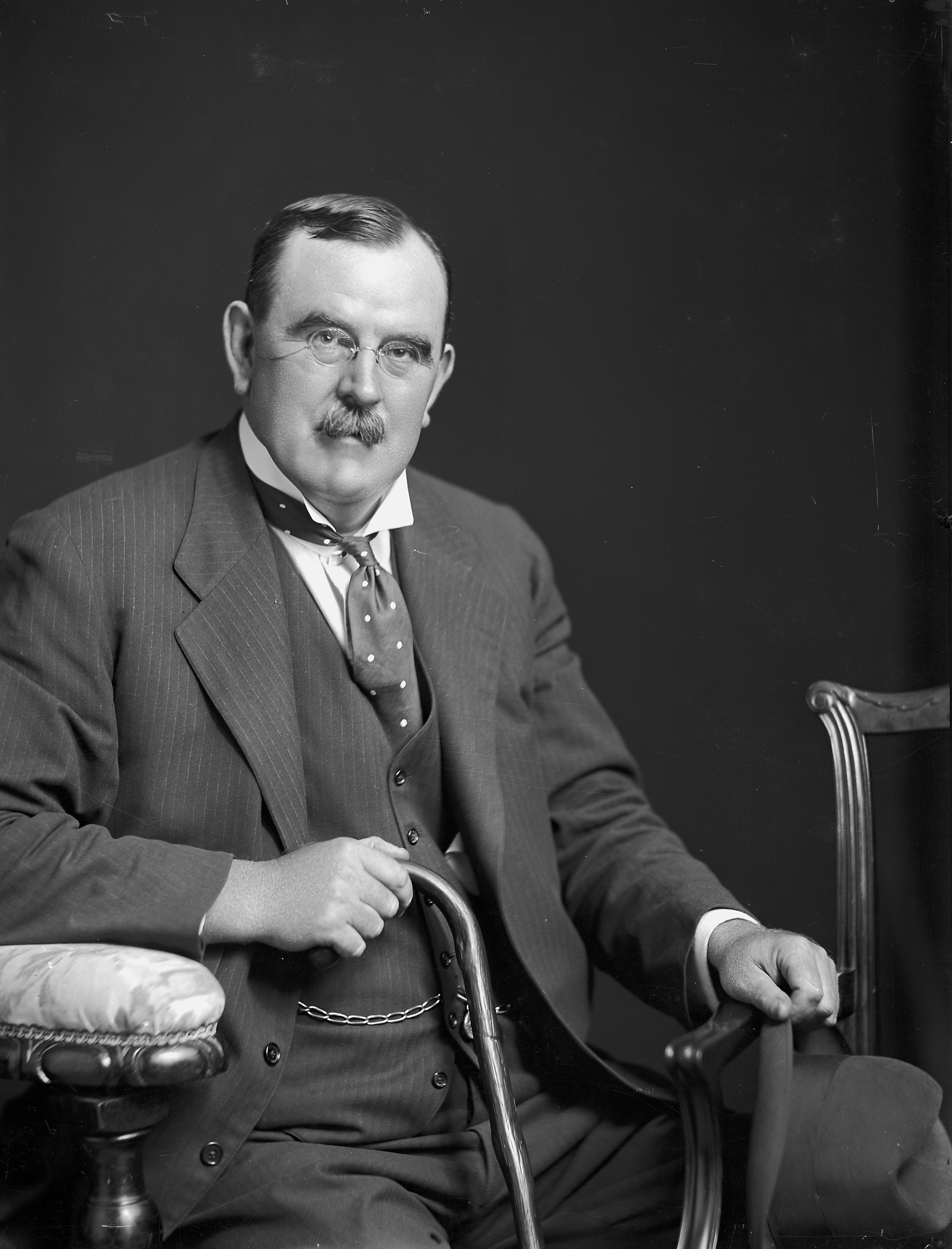
Henry Thacker

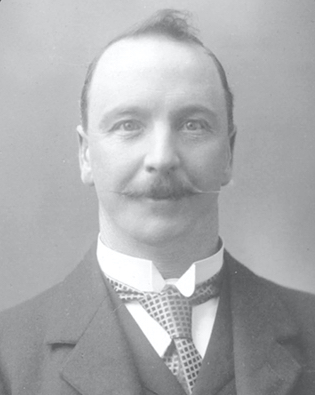
James Douglas

== Events ==
- 25 January – The Southern Maori by-election is won by Henare Uru, following the death of his brother, Hopere Uru, the sitting member, in November the previous year
- 25 December – a 6.4 magnitude earthquake strikes Motunau on Christmas day, causing widespread damage in North Canterbury and Christchurch

== Arts and literature ==
See 1922 in art, 1922 in literature, Category:1922 books

=== Music ===
See: 1922 in music

=== Radio ===
See: Public broadcasting in New Zealand

=== Film ===
- My Lady of the Cave
- The Birth of New Zealand
- Ten Thousand Miles in the Southern Cross

See: Category:1922 film awards, 1922 in film, List of New Zealand feature films, Cinema of New Zealand, Category:1922 films

== Sport ==
=== Chess ===
- The 30th National Chess Championship is held in Dunedin, and is won by John Boyd Dunlop of Oamaru (his second title)

=== Cricket ===
- Plunket Shield

=== Football ===
- A tour by Australia includes three internationals, the first by a New Zealand representative team:
  - 17 June – Carisbrook, Dunedin: won 3–1 by New Zealand
  - 24 June – Athletic Park, Wellington: drawn 1–1
  - 8 July – Auckland Domain, Auckland: won 3–1 by New Zealand
- Provincial league champions:
  - Auckland – North Shore, Philomel (shared)
  - Canterbury – Rangers
  - Hawke's Bay – Hastings United
  - Nelson – Athletic
  - Otago – Seacliff
  - South Canterbury – Rangers
  - Southland – Corinthians
  - Taranaki – Hāwera
  - Wanganui – Eastown Workshops
  - Wellington – Waterside

=== Golf ===
- The ninth New Zealand Open championship is won by A. Brooks.
- The 26th National Amateur Championships are held in the Manawatū:
  - Men – Arthur Duncan (Wellington) (his ninth title)
  - Women – G. Williams (her fifth title)

=== Horse racing ===
==== Harness racing ====
- New Zealand Trotting Cup – Agathos
- Auckland Trotting Cup – Minton Derby

==== Thoroughbred racing ====
- New Zealand Cup – Scion
- Auckland Cup – Scion
- Wellington Cup – Insurrection
- New Zealand Derby – Enthusiasm

=== Lawn bowls ===
The national outdoor lawn bowls championships are held in Dunedin.

- Men's singles champion – J.C. Rigby (North-East Valley Bowling Club)
- Men's pair champions – J. Brackenridge, J.M. Brackenridge (skip) (Newtown Bowling Club)
- Men's fours champions – J.A. McKinnon, W.B. Allan, W. Allan, W. Carswell (skip) (Taieri Bowling Club)

=== Rugby union ===
- 1922 New Zealand rugby union tour of New South Wales
- Wellington loses the Ranfurly Shield on the first challenge, losing to Hawke's Bay 9–19. Hawke's Bay then defends the shield against Bay of Plenty (17–16) and King Country (42–8).

=== Rugby league ===
- 1922 New Zealand rugby league season

=== Shooting ===
- Ballinger Belt – Douglas Roots (Hawera)

== Births ==
=== January–February ===
- 5 January – Bob Aynsley, rugby league player (died 2012)
- 12 January – Una Wickham, cricketer (died 1983)
- 16 January – Bert Wipiti, World War II fighter pilot (died 1943)
- 18 January – Bill Pearson, writer (died 2002)
- 29 January – Ronald Hugh Morrieson, writer (died 1972)
- 4 February – Joan Wiffen, palaeontologist (died 2009)
- 8 February – Laurie Salas, women's rights and peace activist (died 2017)
- 13 February – Godfrey Bowen, shearer (died 1994)
- 19 February – Marie Bell, educationalist, lecturer, teacher (died 2012)
- 24 February – Joyce Macdonald, swimmer (died 2003)
- 27 February – Anthony Treadwell, architect (died 2003)

=== March–April ===
- 9 March – Ian Turbott, colonial administrator, university administrator (died 2016)
- 13 March – Brun Smith, cricketer (died 1997)
- 17 March – Pat Suggate, geologist (died 2016)
- 18 March – Johnny Simpson, rugby union player (died 2010)
- 21 March – Frank Watkins, World War II pilot (died 1942)
- 22 March – Dick Shortt, cricket umpire (died 1994)
- 24 March – Vincent Gray, chemist, climate-change denier (died 2018)
- 25 March – Grace Hollander, community leader (died 2016)
- 26 March – Bill Mumm, rugby union player, politician (died 1993)
- 8 April – Arnold Christensen, World War II fighter pilot, "Great Escape" participant (died 1944)
- 12 April – Ann Wylie, botanist (died 2024)
- 19 April – Jack Dodd, physicist (died 2005)
- 21 April – Zena Abbott, weaver (died 1993)
- 22 April – Frank Houston, Pentecostal Christian pastor (died 2004)
- 28 April – Ruth Kirk, anti-abortion campaigner, wife of Norman Kirk (died 2000)
- 30 April – Avis M. Dry, clinical psychologist (died 2007)

=== May–June ===
- 11 May – Marguerite Story, Cook Islands politician (died 2009)
- 16 May – Peter Hall, World War II pilot (died 2010)
- 18 May – Ian Botting, rugby union player (died 1980)
- 25 May – Joyce Powell, cricketer (died 2003)
- 8 June – Jim Weir, diplomat (died 2012)
- 14 June – Max Carr, field athlete and coach, athletics official, air force officer (died 2016)
- 19 June – Ray Forster, arachnologist, museum director (died 2000)
- 24 June – Ken Avery, jazz musician, songwriter (died 1983)
- 28 June – Pauline O'Regan, educator, community worker, writer (died 2019)

=== July–August ===
- 4 July – Derek Wilson, architect, environmentalist (died 2016)
- 10 July – Rowan Barbour, cricketer (died 2004)
- 22 July – Jim Allen, visual artist (died 2023)
- 25 July – Alan Peart, World War II fighter pilot (died 2018)
- 31 July
  - Kenneth Clark, ceramicist (died 2012)
  - Owen Hardy, World War II fighter pilot (died 2018)
- 9 August – Peter Johnstone, rugby union player (died 1997)
- 1 August – Alf Budd, rugby union player (died 1989)
- 2 August – Dell Bandeen, netball player (died 2009)
- 10 August – John Feeney, documentary film director (died 2006)
- 13 August – Arch Jelley, athletics coach (died 2026)
- 20 August – Rona McKenzie, cricketer (died 1999)
- 27 August – Dorothy Potter, ophthalmic surgeon (died 2009)

=== September–October ===
- 1 September – Harold Logan, Standardbred racehorse (died 1948)
- 11 September – Jack Shallcrass, author, educator, humanist (died 2014)
- 15 September – Norman Rumsey, optical systems designer (died 2007)
- 17 September – Ted Smith, rower (died 1997)
- 26 September –
  - Johnny Smith, rugby union player (died 1974)
  - Brian Waugh, airline operator and pilot (died 1984)
- 4 October – Morrie Church, rugby league coach (died 1981)
- 9 October – Kendrick Smithyman, poet (died 1995)
- 10 October –
  - Harry Cave, cricketer (died 1989)
  - Nan Clark, trade unionist (died 1964)
- 11 October – Cole Wilson, musician, singer-songwriter (died 1993)
- 12 October – Randal Elliott, ophthalmologist (died 2010)
- 18 October – Laurie Haig, rugby union player (died 1992)
- 21 October –
  - Bruce Barclay, politician (died 1979)
  - Hone Tuwhare, poet (died 2008)
- 30 October – Bob Chapman, political scientist, historian (died 2004)

=== November–December ===
- 3 November – Alan Blake, rugby union player (died 2010)
- 7 November – Roy McKenzie, horse breeder, philanthropist (died 2007)
- 13 November – Syd Jensen, motorcycle racer, motor racing driver (died 1999)
- 14 November – Douglas MacDiarmid, painter (died 2020)
- 16 November – J.C.P. Williams, cardiologist
- 19 November – Yvonne Rust, potter (died 2002)
- 22 November – Helen Brew, actor, birth campaigner, documentary filmmaker, educator and speech therapist (died 2013)
- 25 November – Maurice Duggan, writer (died 1974)
- 1 December – William James Lanyon Smith, naval officer (died 2018)
- 5 December – Keith Sinclair, historian, poet, politician (died 1993)
- 13 December – Norm Wilson, rugby union player (died 2001)
- 19 December – Christine Cole Catley, journalist, publisher, author (died 2001)
- 26 December – Iain Gallaway, cricketer and broadcaster (died 2021)

=== Exact date unknown ===
- Bettina Welch, actor (died 1993)

== Deaths ==
=== January–March ===
- 4 January – William Wilson McCardle, nurseryman, founder of Pahiatua, politician (born 1844)
- 14 January – Arthur Thomas Bate, sharebroker, public servant, rugby union and cricket administrator, philatelist (born 1855)
- 16 January – Alan Scott, World War I pilot (born 1883)
- 18 February – Thomas Peacock, politician (born 1837)
- 20 January – Henry Harper, Anglican priest (born 1833)
- 24 February – W. D. H. Baillie, politician (born 1827)
- 7 March – Alexander Donald, sailmaker, merchant, ship owner (born 1842)

=== April–June ===
- 1 April – George Carter, rugby union player (born 1854)
- 3 April – Horace Moore-Jones, war artist (born 1868)
- 14 April – Emma Ostler, businesswoman, prohibitionist (born c.1848)
- 19 April – Percy Smith, ethnologist, surveyor (born 1840)
- 21 April – Robert Thompson, politician (born 1840)
- 15 May – Edward Kellett, politician (born 1864)
- 25 May – Edith Mellish, Anglican deaconess and nun (born 1861)
- 28 May – John von Dadelszen, public servant, statistician (born 1845)
- 15 June – Peter Dignan, politician, mayor of Auckland (1897–98) (born 1847)
- 16 June – Henry Wise, stationer, printer, publisher (born 1835)
- 18 June – Robert Lee, teacher, school inspector, educationalist (born c.1837)
- 23 June – Myer Caselberg, businessman, politician, mayor of Masterton (1886–88) (born 1841)
- 27 June – Frederick George Ewington, estate agent, philanthropist, pamphleteer (born 1844)
- 28 June – George Helmore, rugby union player (born 1862)

=== July–September ===
- 2 July – Seymour Thorne George, politician (born 1851)
- 14 July – Edward Seager, policeman, gaoler, asylum superintendent (born 1828)
- 29 July – Charles John Ayton, diarist (born 1846)
- 29 August – Charles Albert Creery Hardy, politician (born 1865)
- 30 August –
  - John Ewing, goldminer (born 1844)
  - Tom Pollard, comic opera producer and manager (born 1857)
- 31 August – James Job Holland, politician, mayor of Auckland (1893–96) (born 1841)
- 3 September – Donald Reid, politician (born 1850)
- 16 September – Constance Barnicoat, stenographer, interpreter, mountaineer, journalist (born 1872)
- 22 September – Elizabeth Torlesse, community leader (born c. 1835)
- 29 September – Lewis Hotop, pharmacist, Arbor Day advocate, politician, mayor of Queenstown (1880–81, 1891–94, 1903–06) (born c.1844)

=== October–December ===
- 12 October – William Whitby, master mariner, ship owner (born 1838)
- 13 October – Edward Pearce, politician (born 1832)
- 22 November – Moore Neligan, Anglican bishop (born 1863)
- 14 December – Ann Robertson, businesswoman, litigant (born 1825)
- 15 December – Richard Tucker, wool scourer (born 1856)
- 16 December – Charles Harley. politician, mayor of Nelson (1915–17) (born 1861)
- 18 December – John James Pringle, dermatologist (born 1855)
- 25 December – George Sale, politician, newspaper editor, university professor (born 1831)
- 26 December – Arthur Rhodes, politician, mayor of Christchurch (1901–02) (born 1859)

== See also ==
- History of New Zealand
- List of years in New Zealand
- Military history of New Zealand
- Timeline of New Zealand history
- Timeline of New Zealand's links with Antarctica
- Timeline of the New Zealand environment
