= Anne Robertson =

Anne or Ann Robertson may refer to:

- Ann Robertson (businesswoman) (1825–1922), New Zealand accommodation-house owner, businesswoman and litigant
- Ann Robertson (nurse), British nurse and hospice founder
- Ann Robertson (silversmith), English silversmith
- Ann Eliza Worcester Robertson, American missionary and teacher
- Anne Robertson Cockrill, American pioneer and landowner
- Anne Strachan Robertson (1910–1997), Scottish archaeologist, numismatist and writer
- Anne Isabella Robertson (c. 1830 – 1910), writer and suffragist
- Anne Charlotte Robertson (1949–2012), American filmmaker
- Anne Walters Robertson (born 1952), American musicologist
- Anne Robertson, Australian reality TV participant on Australian Idol

== See also ==
- Anna Mae Robertson (1924–2025), United States Army officer
