= Richard Waugh =

Richard Waugh may refer to:

- Richard Waugh (actor) (born 1961), Canadian voice actor
- Richard Deans Waugh (1868–1938), Canadian politician, mayor of Winnipeg
- Richard E. Waugh (born 1947), Canadian banking executive
- Richard James Waugh (born 1957), New Zealand minister, writer
