= Anne-Charlotte =

Anne-Charlotte or Anne Charlotte is a feminine given name. People with the name include:

- Princess Anne Charlotte of Lorraine (1714–1773), Abbess of Remiremont and Mons
- Anne-Charlotte de Crussol de Florensac, duchesse d'Aiguillon (1700–1772), Franch translator and salonniere
- Anne Charlotte Leffler, duchess of Caianello (1849–1892), Swedish author
- Anne-Charlotte Mora (born 1997), French professional golfer
- Anne Charlotte Robertson (1949–2012), American filmmaker

== See also ==
- Ann Charlotte Bartholomew (1800–1862), English flower and miniature painter, and author
