= Grand Hotel (Auckland) =

Former hotel in Auckland, New Zealand

Coordinates: 36.8477°S 174.7698°E

The Grand Hotel, at 9 Princes Street, was the leading hotel of Auckland, New Zealand, from 1889 until 1966. With its vaulted ceilings, ornate mantelpieces, and red carpet, the Grand Hotel was a plush and social rendezvous from its opening. The Grand Hotel reopened in 1967/8 as the 'Grand Building' fitted out as offices. The leading hotels of Auckland were in the following order: The Grand Hotel, Princes St (closed 1966), the Central Hotel, Victoria St (closed 1972), the Star Hotel, Albert St (closed 1973), the Royal Hotel, Elliot St (closed 1980s) and the Albert Hotel, Queen St. Consequently, the Grand Hotel facade is the last surviving of the large Victorian- and Edwardian-era hotels in Auckland.

"The Grand Hotel fairly shouts Victoriana from the ornate facade and wrought iron balconies to the marble statuary and plush gloominess of its interior. The manager of the Grand Hotel, Mr S T Johnson, has been there only 16 months although he frequently worked on relief for previous managers. Both he and his wife feel closely identified with the hotel and enjoy its atmosphere and old world tranquillity. "Lord Denning stayed here recently and he was delighted," said Mr Johnson, "He said it reminded him of home." – New Zealand Herald 21 May 1966

The Grand Hotel architect was William Henry Skinner, designed in 1887, costing no more than £3000. The Grand Hotel was owned through Hancock and Company Limited by Moss Davis and later by his sons Sir Ernest Davis and Eliot Davis. The hotel was opened by 1889, however, the interior of the third storey was fitted out at a slightly later date around 1890/91. The Grand replaced the earlier Masonic Hotel that was owned by the Ara Masonic Lodge. Additions to the rear of the Grand on Bankside St took place in 1900 by architect John Currie. In 1902 the hotel was rebuilt after the fire, incorporating the front and side facades that had survived. In 1913, a large extension to the Grand Hotel was completed which included a new dining room, kitchen, scullery, and open-cage lift. This was the last major addition to the hotel.

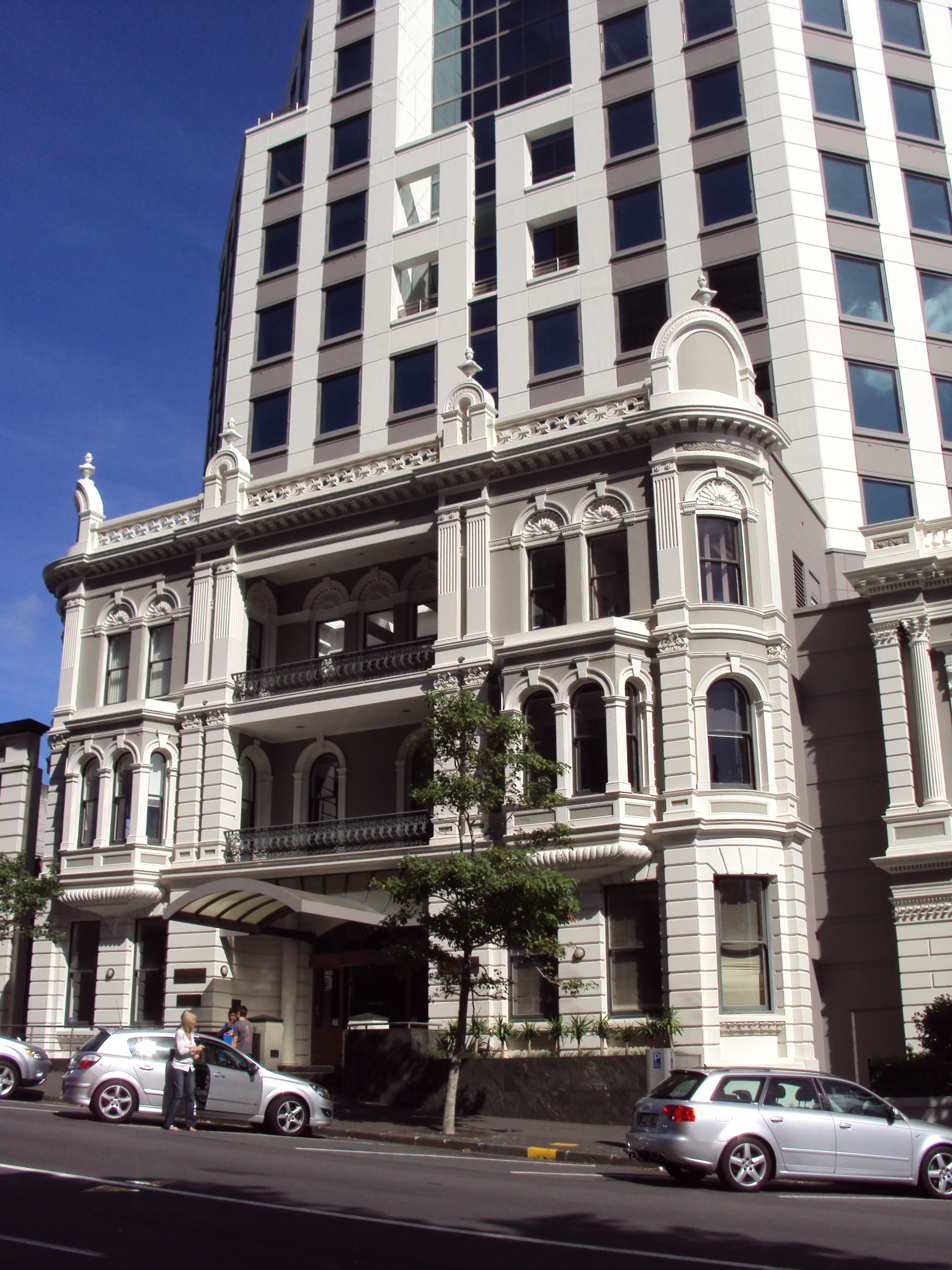
Grand Hotel façade, March 2010. Built 1889.

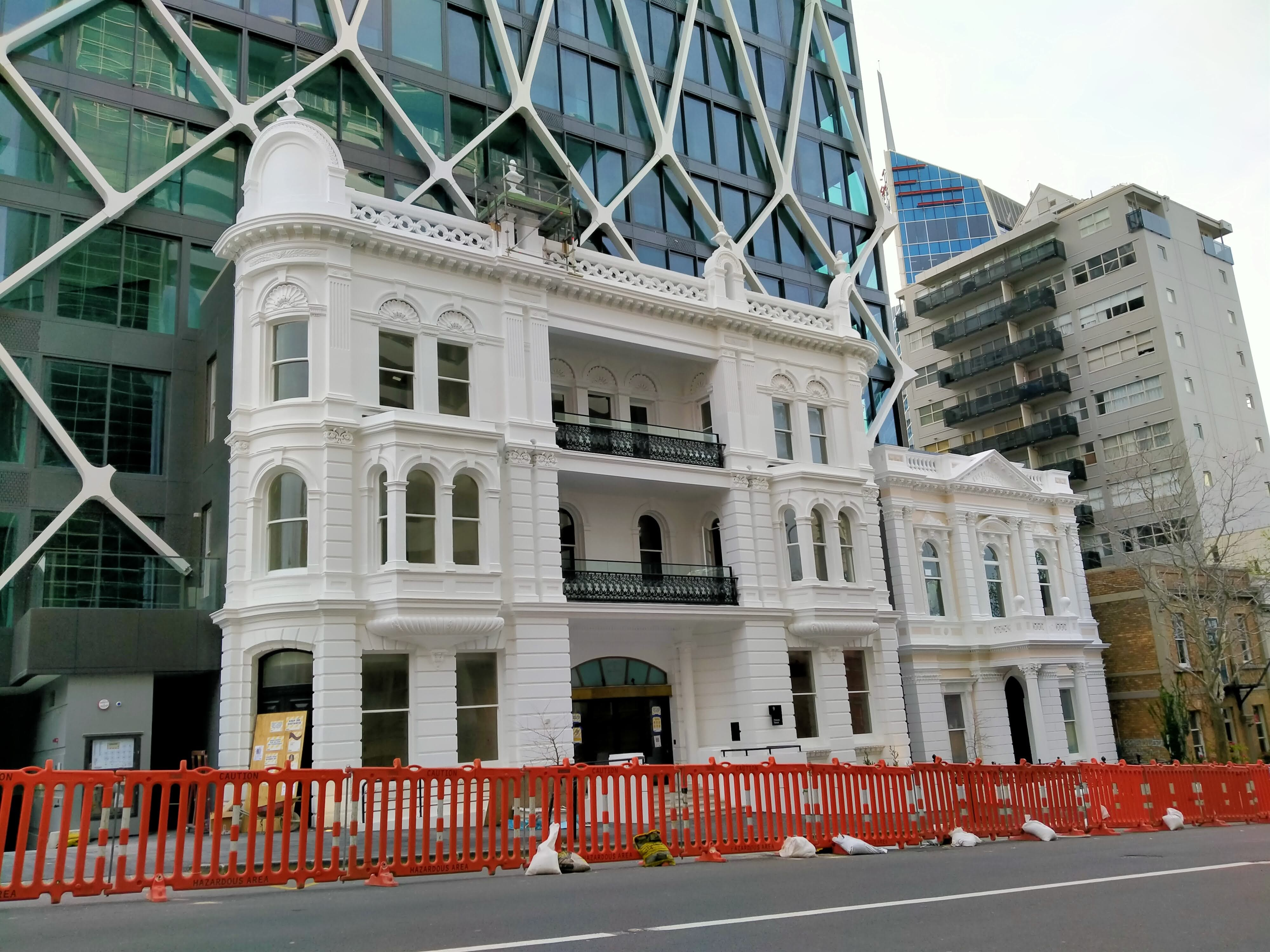
Grand Hotel, International Apartments, 2020

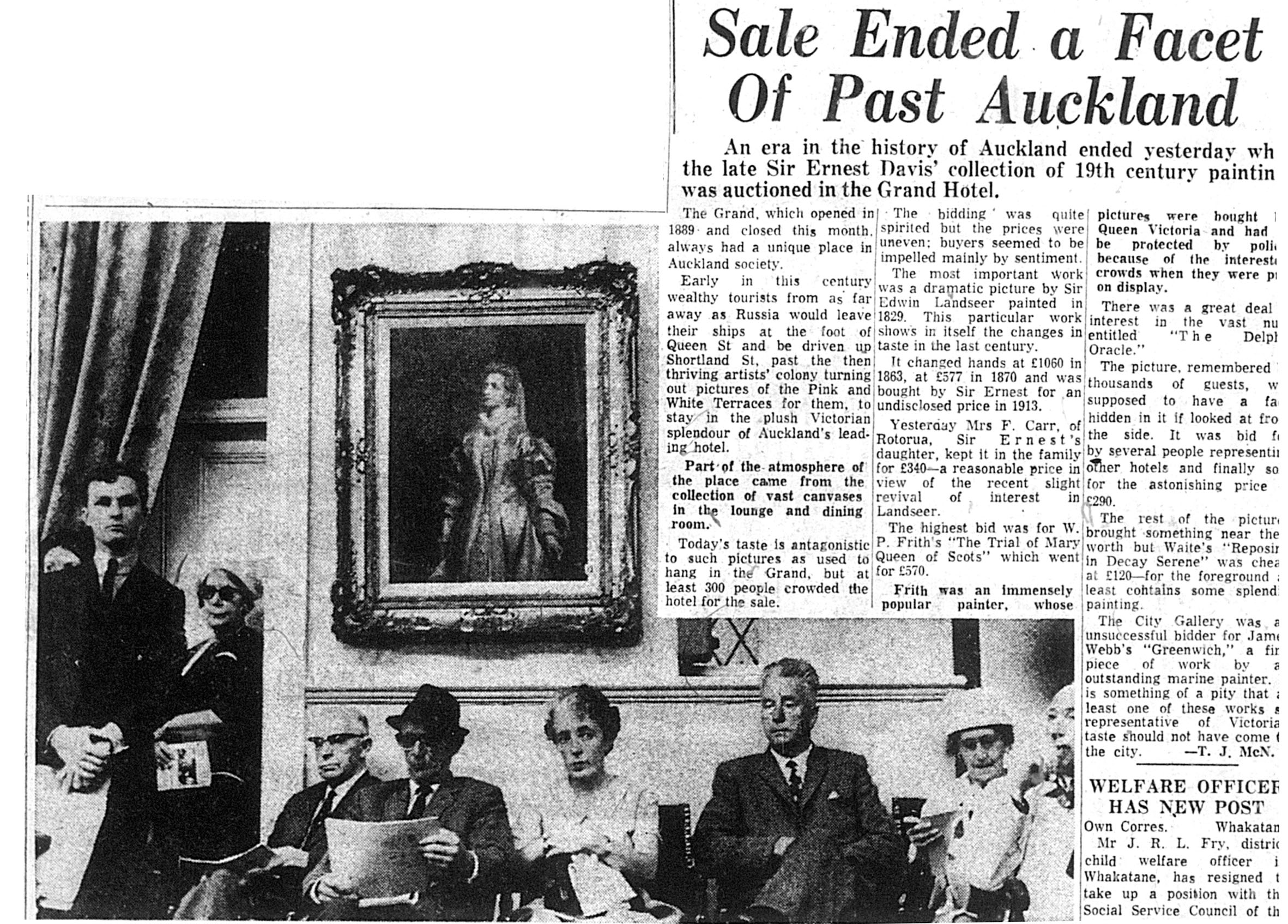
Grand Hotel Auction, Auckland Star, 1966

== Opening ==
The Grand Hotel was opened on 21 April 1889 by Mr Frank Gaudin for the purpose of receiving the Earl and Countess of Onslow on their arrival from Britain.

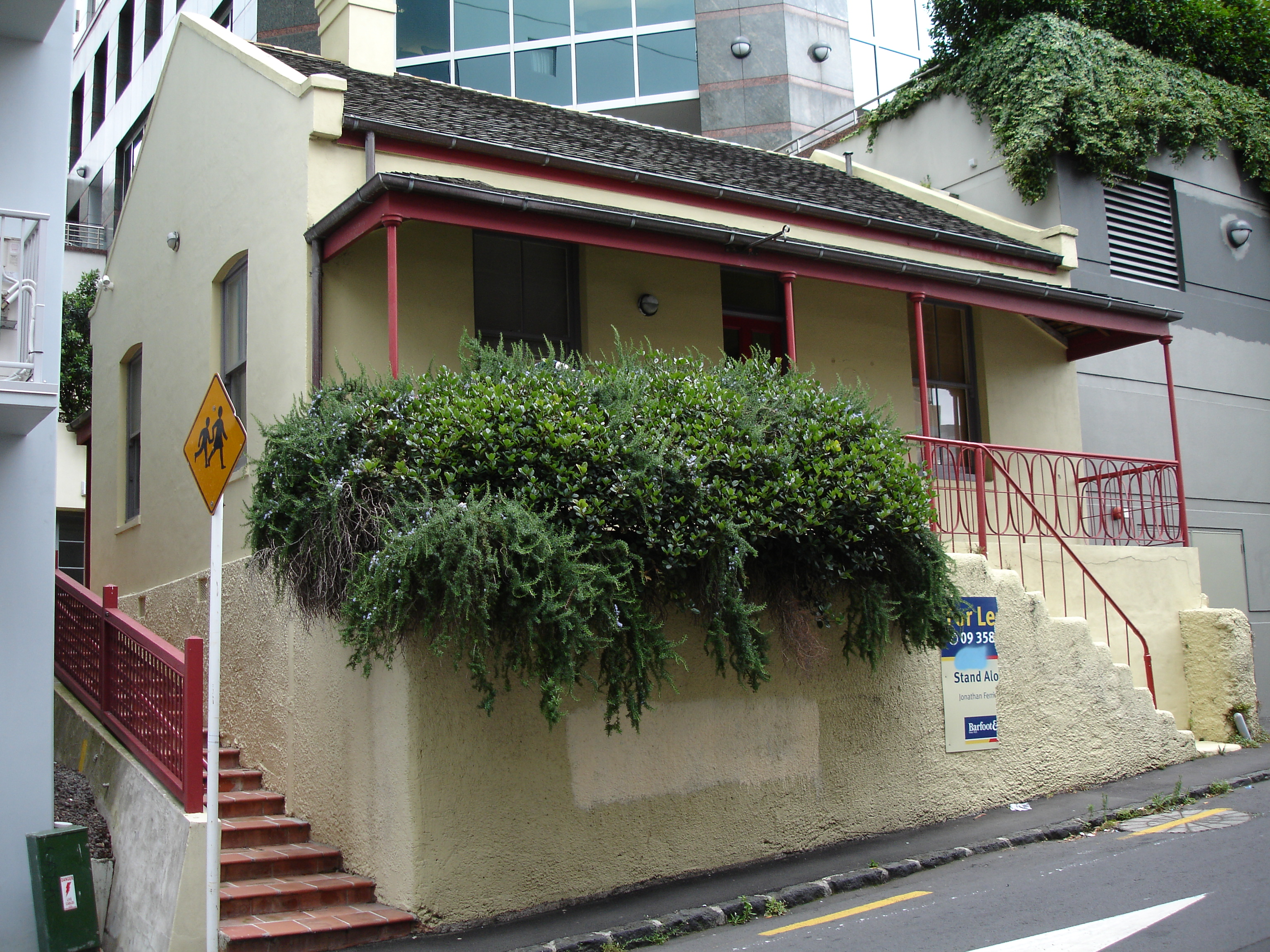
Bankside Cottage, Bankside Street, Central Auckland. Built in the 1880s, the cottage was bought by Hancock & Co. Ltd, brewers, in the mid-1930s. Hancocks were the proprietors of the Grand Hotel next door, facing Princes Street. From the 1930s the cottage was used to accommodate Grand Hotel staff. It was restored when the Grand Hotel was demolished and incorporated into the new development.

== 1901 fire and reconstruction ==
In 1901 the Grand Hotel hit the headlines with a massive fire. At the time of the fire the hotel had just finished being refurbished in anticipation of hosting the Duke and Duchess of Cornwall during their stay in Auckland as part of the 1901 Royal Tour.

The fire almost destroyed the building and killed three children, a bank manager from Wellington and a maid. The cost of the damage was said to be £12,000 and the fire left only the charred external and interior brick walls. The lack of fire escapes became a public concern. The children Leonora, Eva and Nina Johnston died of smoke inhalation, the hotel employee, Dora Wallace died after jumping from the building.

The fire was not the end for the Grand Hotel and it was soon rebuilt, incorporating the original ornate plastered brick street frontage and side walls.

The interior was furnished by large paintings collected by Moss Davis and Ernest Hyam Davis, who leased the Grand Hotel building from the Ara Masonic Lodge through Hancock & Co. Ltd. These paintings were auctioned when the hotel closed on 14 December 1966 and are now in private collection. Many were originally from, and have subsequently returned to, the United Kingdom.

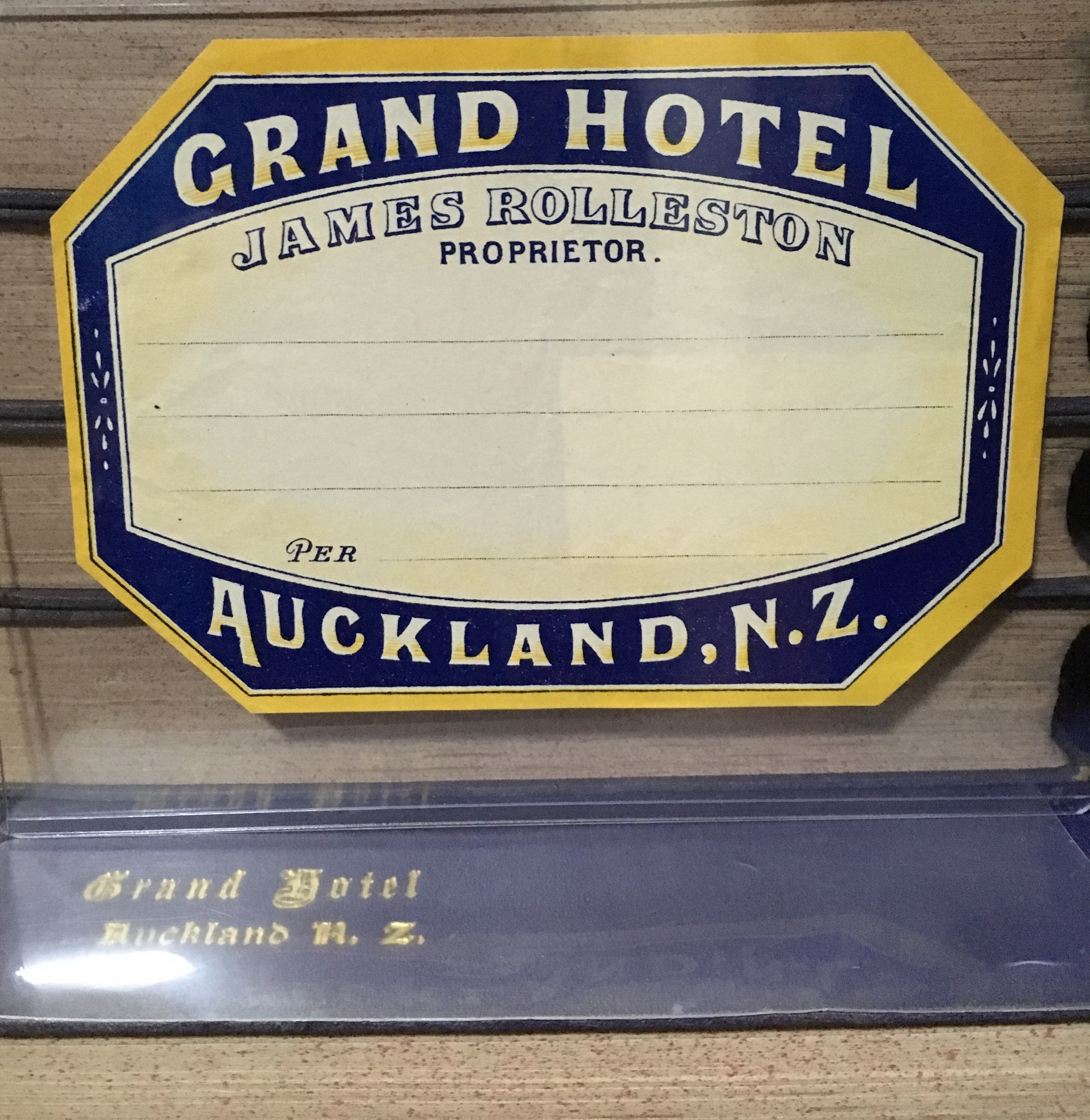
Grand Hotel luggage label c1905-1920

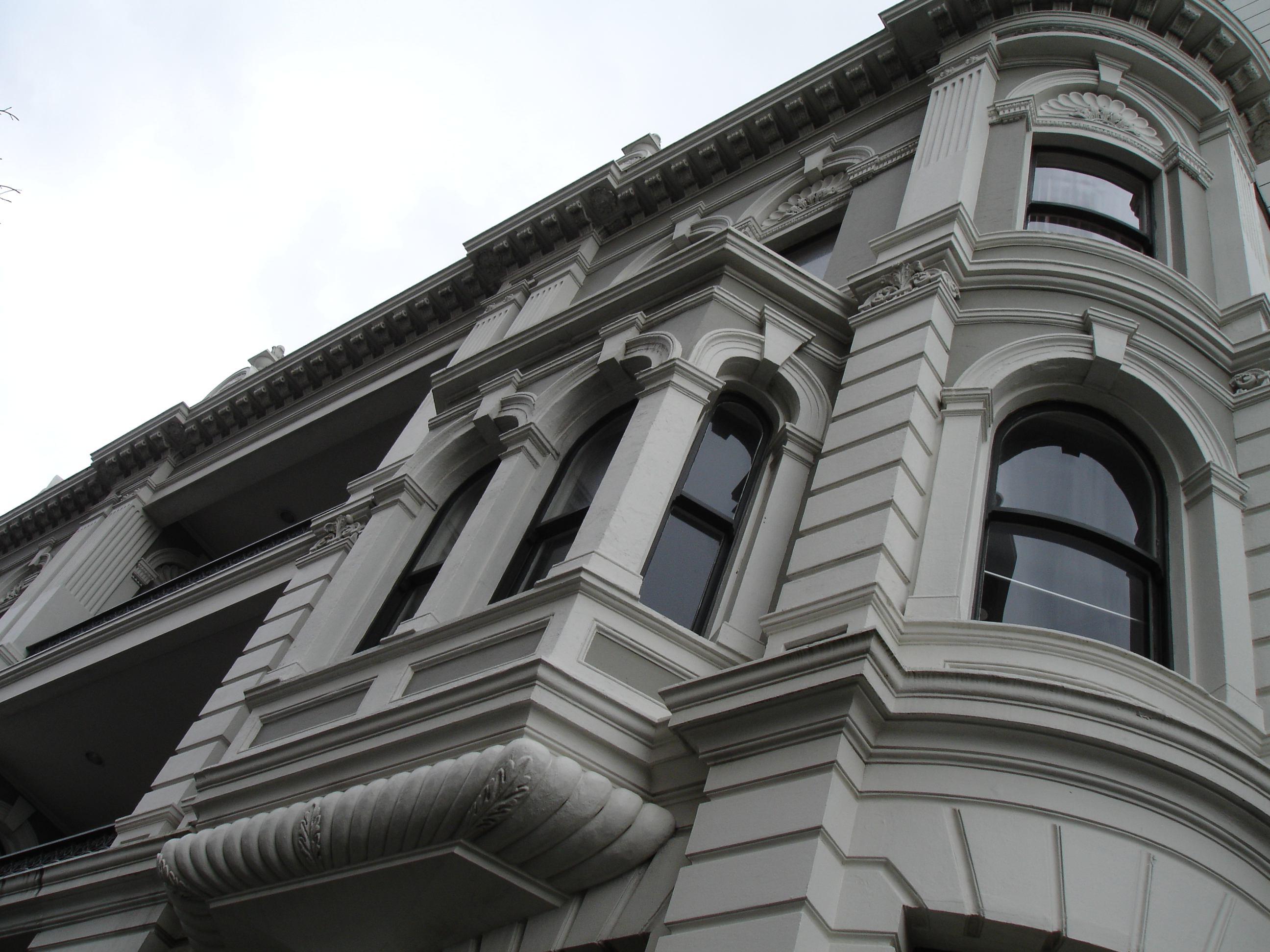
The façade today

== Paintings ==
The collection of paintings was largely formed by Sir Ernest Davis:

J W Godward Contemplation Oil on canvas Signed and dated 1897 50in x 32 in

Delphic Oracle (Dining Room) Oil on canvas. Signed. 90in x 45 in.

19th Century British School A portrait of George III Oil on Canvas 90in x 56 in

19th Century British School A portrait of Sir Walter Raleigh Oil on canvas 72in x 26in

19th Century British School A portrait of Sir Francis Drake Oil on canvas 72in x 26in

19th Century British School A portrait of William Cecil, Lord Burghley K.G. Oil on canvas 56in x 30in

Edwin Long R.A. An Indian type of beauty Oil on canvas Signed with monogram & dated 1884 50in x 32in

Edwin Long R.A. The Chieftain's Daughter Oil on Canvas Signed with monogram and dated 1879 34in x 22in

Sir Edwin Landseer R.A. Attachment Oil on Canvas Signed with initials and dated 1829 38in x 32in Exhibited Royal Academy 1830.

Laslett J. Pott R.I. The corruption of innocence Oil on canvas Signed and dated 1898 39in x 59in

Leon Sprinck (Lafayette) Queen Alexandra A portrait of Life Oil on canvas Signed 54in x 36in

W. P. Frith R.A. The trial of Mary Queen of Scots Mrs Rousby as Queen Elizabeth Exhibited Royal Academy 1870. Cat. No. 344 then Collie Collection. Sold at Christies 26 February 1876. Bought by Wigzel then Davis. 32in x 26in.

E. M. Waite Reposing in decay serene (Lounge of Grand Hotel) Oil on canvas Signed Exhibited Royal Academy 1902 60in x 48in

James Webb Greenwich Oil on canvas Signed 30in x 60in

J.J.W. A storm off the Dutch coast Oil on canvas Signed with initials and dated 1800 24in x 40in

G. S. Walters R.B.A. Fishing boats off Hastings. Watercolour. Signed. 9in x 22.5in

H Moore Sailing vessels off the cost Watercolour Signed and dated 1875 14in x 21in

Theo Weber Ships off a pier Oil on canvas Signed 18in x 28in

S. R. Percy Mountain Landscape Oil on canvas 22in x 30in

J Cardow A sailing boast off the coast Oil on canvas Signed and dated 1869 30in x 56in

Charles Bentley Sailing boats off a stormy coast Oil on canvas 34in x 54in

== Tene Waitere Fireplace ==
In the lounge of the Grand Hotel was a 3-metre x 1.9m fireplace surround and mirror overmantle carved by notable Maori carver Tene Waitere, commissioned in 1887. Since 1966 the mantle has been in private hands.

== Guests ==
Well known guests over the years include: Queen Elizabeth II, Randolph Churchill, Noël Coward, Captain Musick, Ignacy Jan Paderewski, George Formby, Todd Duncan, Webster Booth, Mountbattens, Lord Montgomery, Gracie Fields, Anthony Eden, Duke of Edinburgh, Lord Denning, Dame Margot Fonteyn, Jean Batten, innumerable prime ministers and governors-general.

== Closure ==
"One of the finest and most up-to-date establishments in Auckland". "Outmoded and old fashioned and does not pay its way". These two comments have an ironic ring and to a degree sum up the rise and fall of the Grand Hotel.

In 1966, the Grand Hotel was to be closed. After 77 years of service the Grand Hotel began shutting up shop. The last guests left and only a skeleton staff remained to clean up and staff the bars. A party was held for the staff in the dining room. The star of the occasion was the Chef Mr Lesley Horace Rose who had been chef at the hotel since 1937. "It is a tragedy", said Mr Rose referring to the closing of the Grand Hotel. "The Grand Hotel was the last frontier of the true hotel". "I think I have been chef at this hotel longer than any chef at any other Auckland hotel", he said, "and I have enjoyed every moment". Other staff members were recorded to have been very wistful. Mr Rose stated that it was remarkable that so many had stayed when they knew the hotel was closing down. "It is very sad for me", he said. "The hotel was a tradition in Auckland."

A few weeks later the bar closed "quietly and sedately, as befits the grand old lady of Princes Street" and the building was converted into offices. On 14 December 1966, the hotel contents were auctioned in the hotel which included the paintings, chandeliers, mirrors, chairs and other interior fittings. Other furniture was removed by private collectors and dealers after the main auction sale.

== Grand Building ==
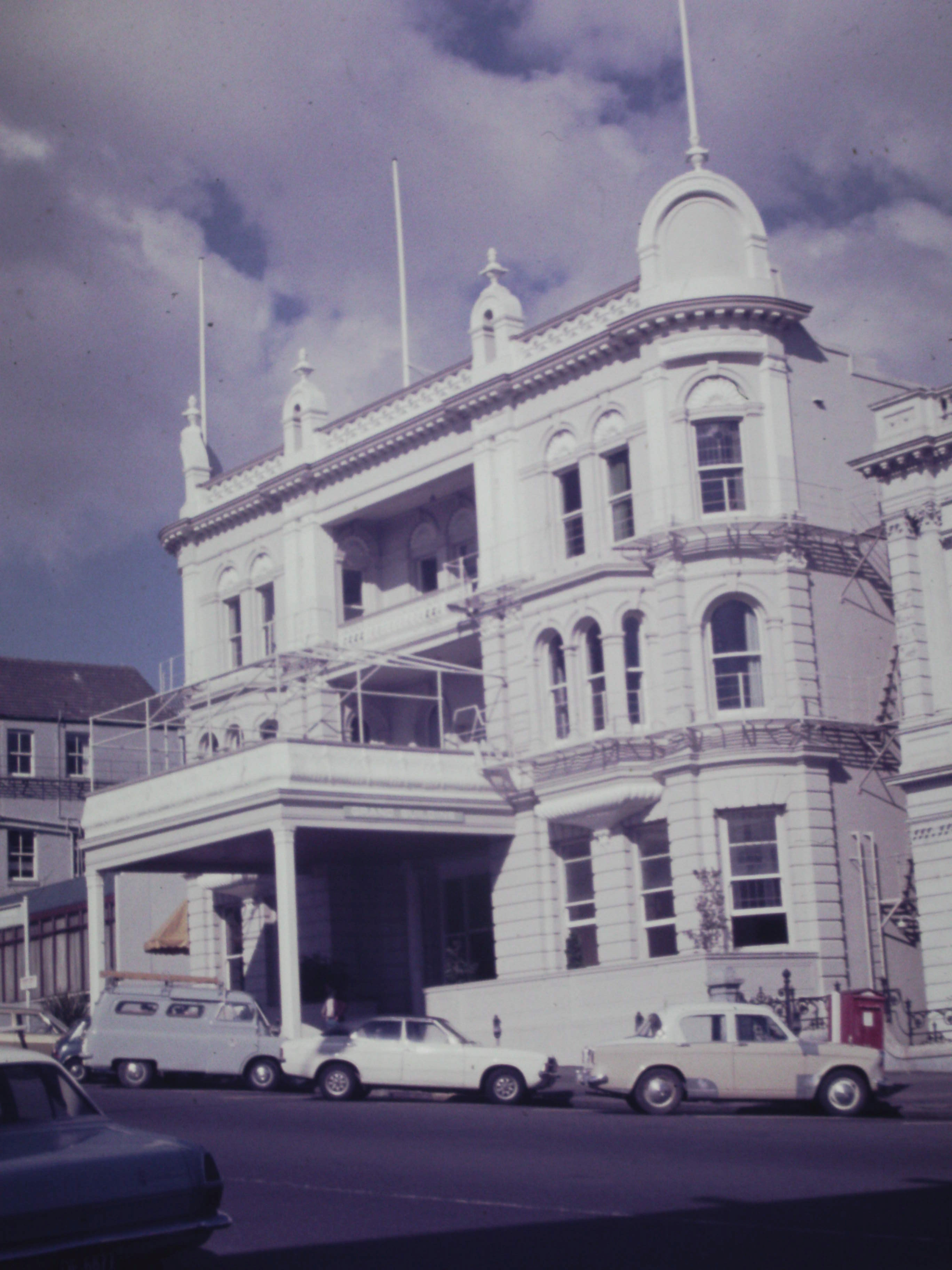
Grand Building, October 1974

As an office building it was renamed "Grand Building". A notable tenant was the Chartered Accountancy firm, Buddle & Co, whose board room on the first floor and a balcony were part of the Royal Suite used by dignitaries, including Queen Elizabeth II and the Duke of Edinburgh. In 1979 the Grand Hotel was controversially reduced from a completely protected building to just its front facade.

== Demolition ==
In 1987 the Auckland City Council approved the development of a 15-floor office tower on the site. It was to include the facades of the Grand Hotel and the neighbouring 1881 Freemasons Hall. Demolition began and in 1988 and before long nothing was left of the old hotel other than the bare facade, incorporated into the glass tower which is now the headquarters of dairy company Fonterra.

== Conversion ==
In 2016 it was announced that the façade of the Grand Hotel and Freemason's Hall will be preserved while the office tower behind will be converted into apartments, known as 'The International', as part of major refurbishments. Re-design of the project occurred with architects Jasmax and Marchese Partners, while structural strengthening and redesign was completed by Bonacci Group, now Meinhardt-Bonacci. Fletcher Building was appointed main contractors but pulled out after initial discussions, after which Dominion Constructors were awarded the project. The project is now completed.
