= William Henry Skinner =

British-NZ architect (1838–1915)

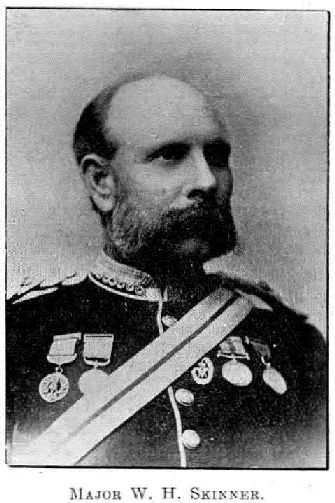
- Major William Henry Skinner
- Born: 3 December 1838; Newport, Wales
- Died: 21 May 1915 (aged 76)
- Occupations: Architect, Surveyor
- Known for: Major, Royal Rifle Volunteers

William Henry Skinner (1838–1915) was a Welsh-born architect who migrated to New Zealand, and reached the rank of major in the Royal Rifle Volunteers. His notable buildings included the Evening Star office, Onehunga Woollen Works, the Grand Hotel, the Northcote Tavern and St Paul's churches in Auckland, and St James' Union Church in Thames, New Zealand.

== Biography ==
Skinner was born in 1838 in Newport, Wales. He was the second son of John Skinner, builder of 'Barnstable and Lynton' North Devon. He grew up in England and attended the department of science and art at the Imperial College London. He was awarded a bronze medal for 'success in art' in 1859.

He arrived in Auckland, New Zealand, on 18 August 1859, by the ship Joseph Fletcher. On 21 December the same year, Skinner joined the Royal Rifle Volunteers, and served during the earlier part of the New Zealand Wars. He was gazetted Ensign of the Royal Company on 18 January 1868; Lieutenant commanding No. 2 Company, Auckland Rifle Volunteers on 2 July 1874; Sub-Lieutenant Victoria Company on 2 November 1875; Lieutenant on 18 May 1880; Captain on 7 November 1885; Adjutant on 25 October 1886; and Major on 21 November 1889.

Major Skinner held the Imperial decoration for long service, and also New Zealand war and long service medals; and he was selected to represent New Zealand at the Intercolonial Rifle Match in Melbourne in 1873, and also in 1888.

After his arrival in the colony, Skinner worked as a builder and contractor. From 1880, he practised as an architect, and designed and carried out several important buildings in Auckland and Thames, New Zealand.

Skinner also helped establish an early gymnasium and singing classes in Auckland; held the position of precentor at the Newton Presbyterian Church for over ten years; was an active member of the Orpheus Glee Club and several choirs; and was one of the founders of the Auckland Technical School (now Auckland University of Technology).

== List of buildings ==
Sources:

- Evening Star newspaper office, Shortland Street, Auckland (1883) (demolished)
- Temporary St Paul's Anglican Church, Eden Crescent, Auckland (1885) (now Tātai Hono marae, part of Church of the Holy Sepulchre)
- Onehunga Woollen Works, Auckland (1886–1887)
- Grand Hotel, Princes Street, Auckland (1889) (now a façade)
- Freemasons' Hall, Princes Street, Auckland (1889) (now a façade)
- Northcote Hotel, Auckland (1889) (now Northcote Tavern)
- St Paul's Anglican Church, Symonds Street, Auckland (1894–1895)
- St James' Union Church, Thames (1897)
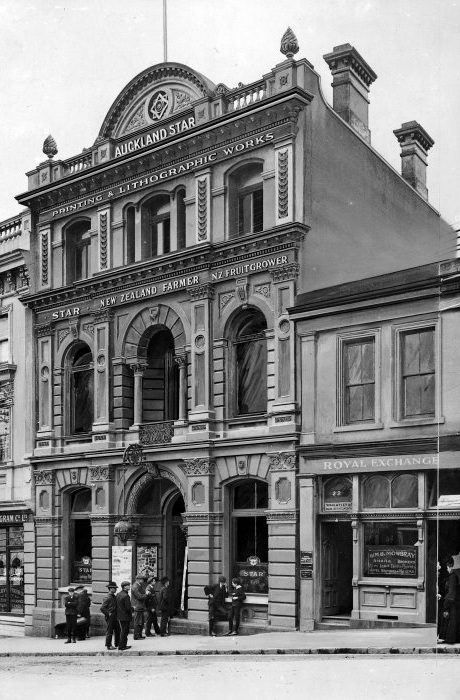
The Evening Star office, in 1910.

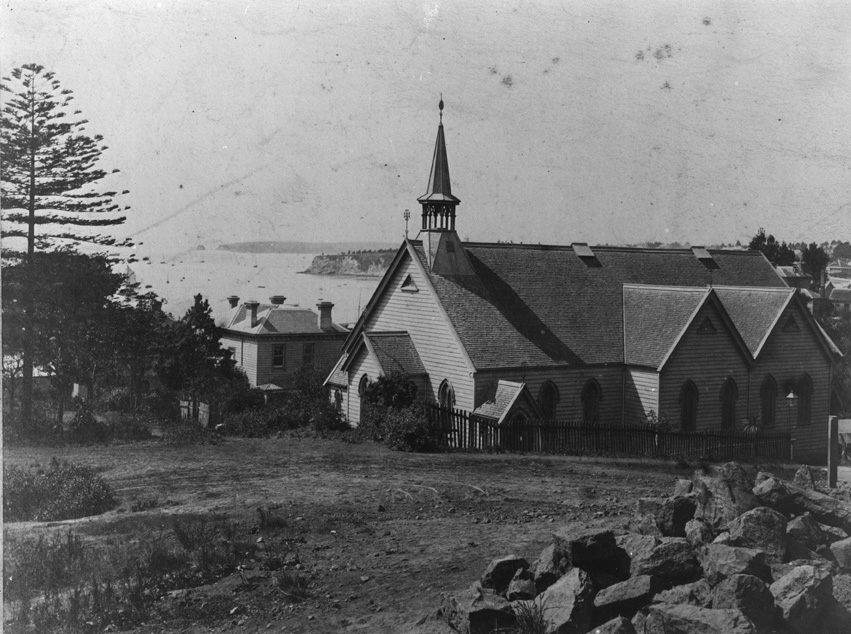
The temporary St Paul's building, in the 1880s.

Grand Hotel and Freemasons' Hall façades, in 2025.

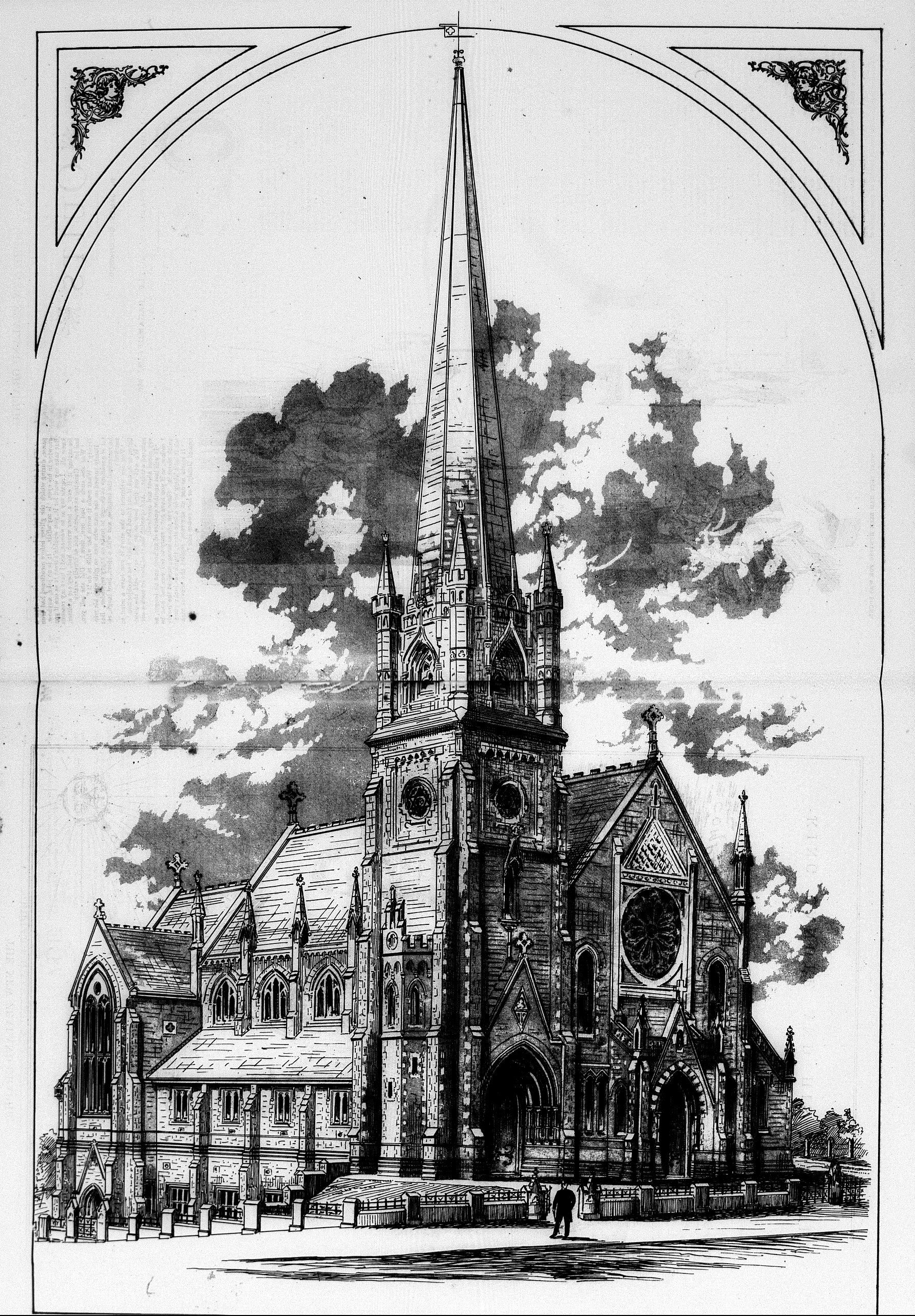
Skinner's 1894 perspective of the third St Paul's building, with planned steeple.

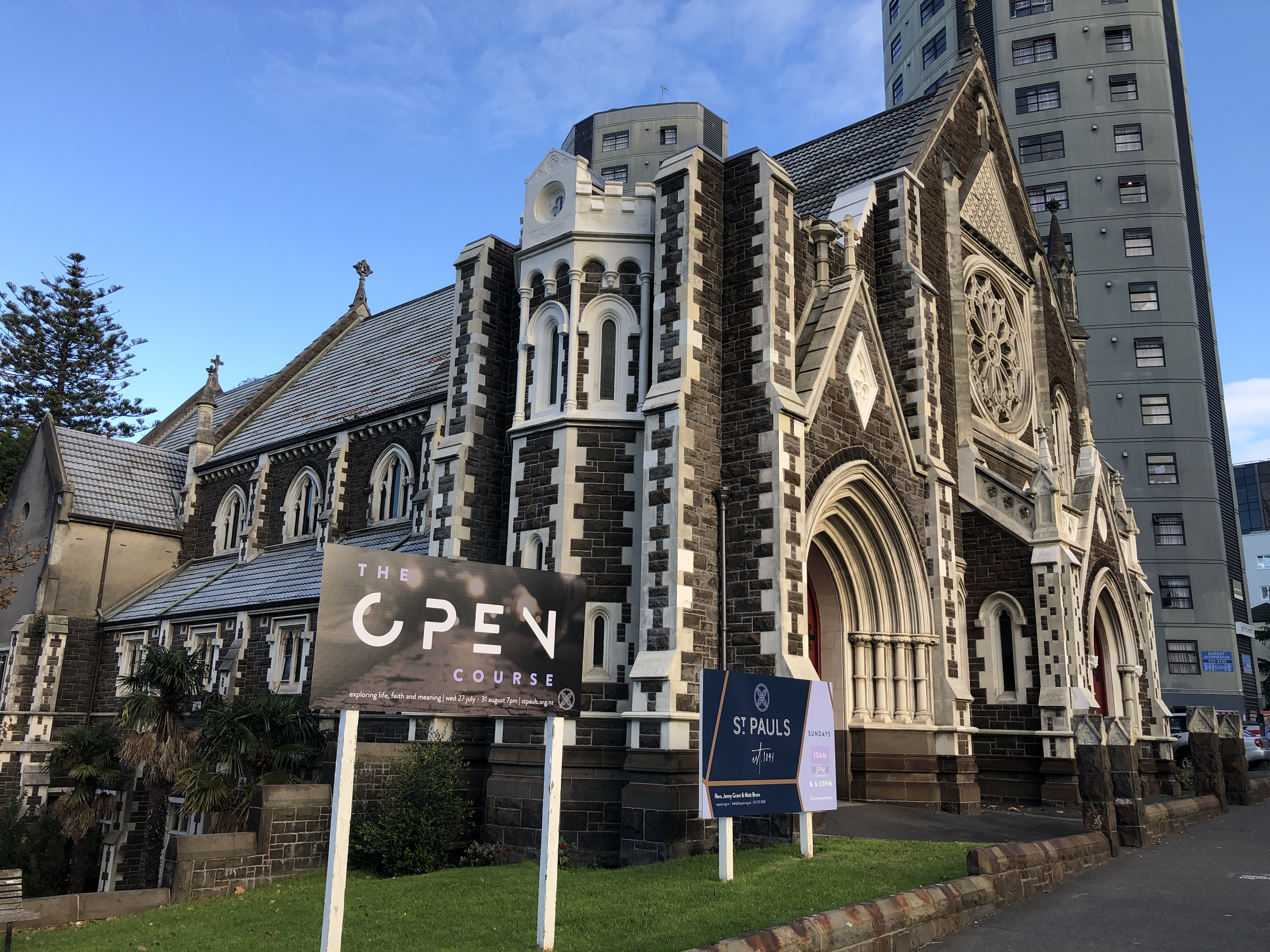
St Paul's Church on Symonds Street, in 2022.

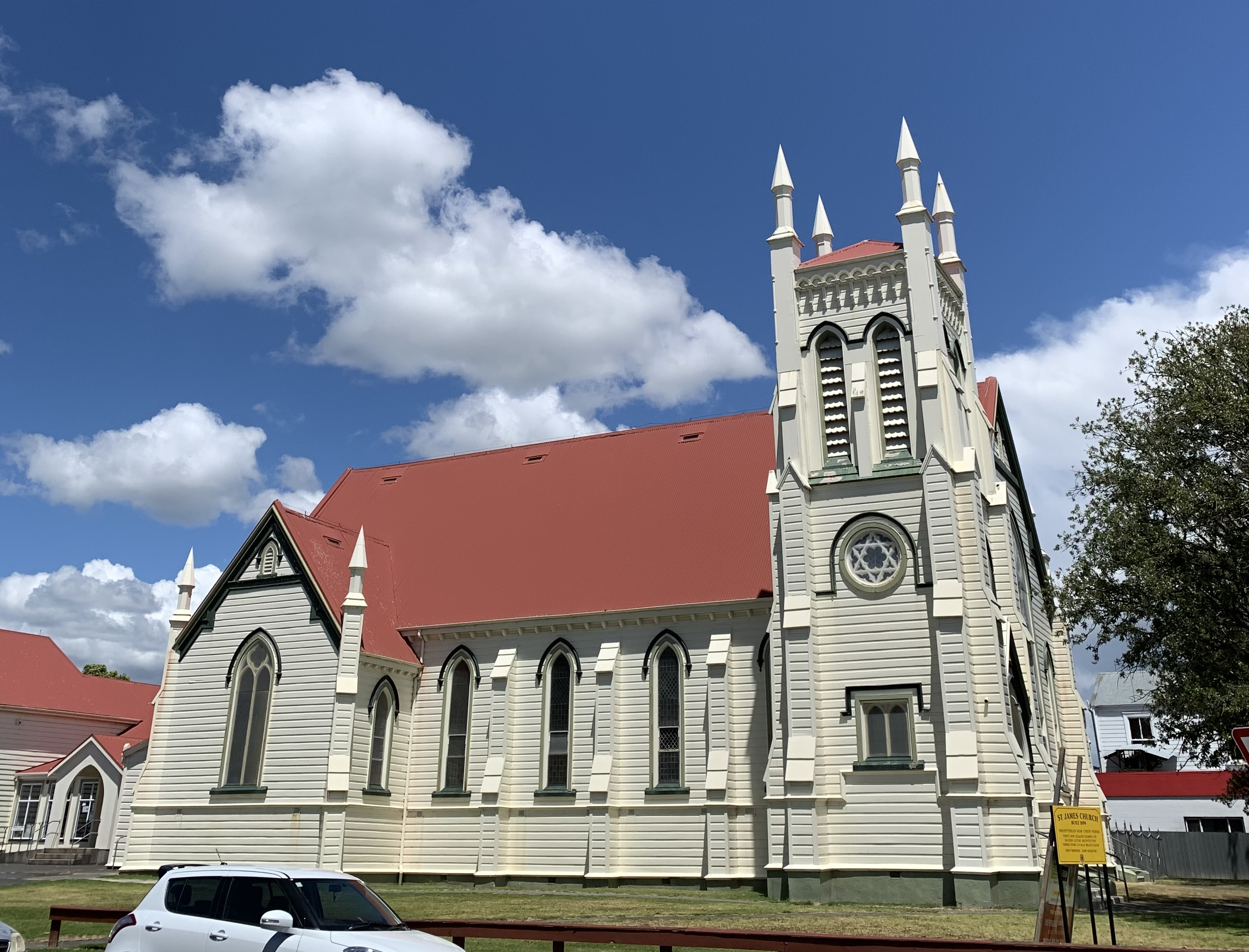
St James' Union Church, Thames in 2020.
