= Marion Mitchell (singer) =

New Zealand singer

Marion Mitchell, Lady Davis (19 October 1876 – 5 May 1955) was a New Zealand singer. She married Ernest Davis who became mayor of Auckland.

== Biography ==
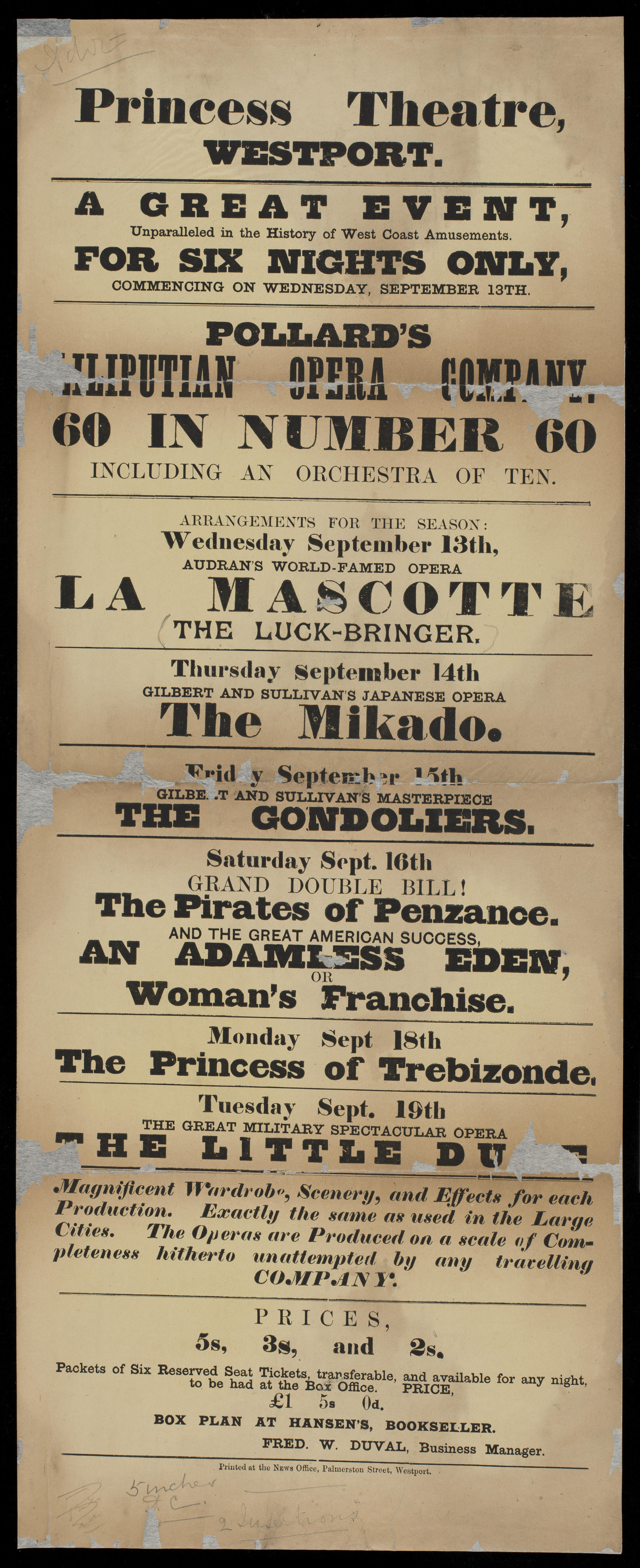
Playbill for Pollard's at Princess Theatre, Westport, 1893. The whole company performed the operas.

Mitchell was born in Wellington, New Zealand on 19 October 1876, the daughter of Fanny Maria Wheatland Waters and Walter Mitchell. Her father was an amateur musician, who played the cornet in a theatre orchestra and as a child Mitchell developed musical talent as a singer.

At the age of 14 she was auditioned by opera producer Tom Pollard who accepted her to undertake training in The Pollard Juvenile Opera Company, his young persons opera company (formerly called the Lilliputian Opera Company). The company toured in New Zealand and Australia and every day there were rehearsals, time set aside for school lessons and evening performances. She quickly took on lead roles in comic operas such as Nanki Poo in The Mikado, Mabel in the Pirates of Penzance and Poppo in La mascotte winning acclaim for her singing and acting performances in New Zealand and Australia. In 1892 after performances of The Gondoliers in Melbourne she was lauded by a critic who said "we have our Madame Melba, why shouldn't New Zealand have her Madame Zealandia". In 1893 performances in Wellington brought in large crowds to see Mitchell in The Little Duke. After five years in the company Mitchell was able to play, without rehearsal, prima donna roles in 20 operettas and two pantomimes.

Mitchell received gifts from her fans including a diamond bracelet, pearl ring, gold brooch and flowers. An Auckland businessman Ernest Davis was particularly enamoured to the point where he followed her around the country. They became engaged in 1897. While Pollard realised that Mitchell was a particularly successful drawcard he ensured that other performers in the company were given opportunities which allowed him to ease Mitchell out of the company and enabled her to leave in early 1899. Singers such as Gertie Campion, May Beatty and Lily Stephens took on her roles.

Ernest Davis belonged to a devout Jewish family which required Mitchell to obtain permission of the Chief Rabbi in London before she could convert to Judaism and they could be married. She married Davis in 1899, who later became Mayor of Auckland; he was knighted in 1937, making her Lady Davis. The couple had two children.

Marion Davis died on 5 May 1955 in Auckland and was buried in the Hebrew Section of Waikumete Cemetery.

== Ernest and Marion Davis Library ==
After Davis died her husband offered to build a library at Auckland Hospital in her memory. It opened in 1961 and was called the Marion Davis Memorial Library but later renamed the Ernest and Marion Davis Library. The library holds a medical history collection of books, surgical instruments and apothecary jars.
