= Ernest Davis (brewer) =

New Zealand mayor

Sir Ernest Davis
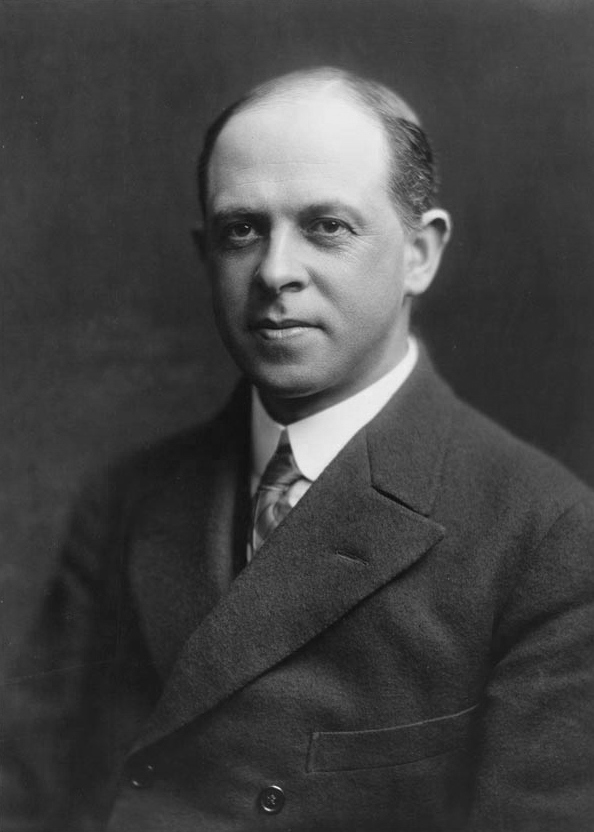

27th Mayor of Auckland City
- In office 15 May 1935 – 28 May 1941
- Deputy: Bernard Martin (1935–38); George Richardson (1938); John Allum (1938–41)
- Preceded by: George Hutchison
- Succeeded by: John Allum

Personal details
- Born: 17 February 1872 Nelson, New Zealand
- Died: 16 September 1962 (aged 90) Auckland, New Zealand
- Party: Labour (national); Citizens (local)
- Spouse: Marion Mitchell (m. 1899; died 1955)
- Relatives: Eliot Davis (brother)

Sir Ernest Hyam Davis (17 February 1872 – 16 September 1962) was a New Zealand businessman, and was Mayor of Auckland City from 1935 to 1941. He was also on other Auckland local bodies (Fire Board, Hospital Board, Drainage Board, Auckland Surf Life Saving Association) and on various philanthropic and sporting organisations. He was Mayor of Newmarket (a small inner-Auckland borough) from 1909 to 1910.

== Early life ==
Davis was born on 17 February 1872 in Nelson to brewer Moss Davis and Leah Davis (née Jacobs). He attended Bishop's School in Nelson, and Auckland Grammar. On 2 August 1899, he married Marion Mitchell, who had made a career as an opera singer with her debut at age 14.

== Career ==
Davis joined the brewing industry with W Macarthur & Co, and later became managing director of Hancock & Co. In 1923, New Zealand Breweries was formed. He was a brewery baron for half a century, and a master tactician against the Prohibition movement. His brother, Eliot Davis, was also in brewing.

During the 1912 Waihi miners' strike, the strike leaders were imprisoned. They were released in November for securities of £1600, which was put up by Davis. He was a major source of funds for the Labour Party, and was Michael Joseph Savage's employer for most of the period 1908–1919. He also employed John A. Lee to manage the Palace Hotel in Rotorua from 1929 to 1931 after Lee lost his seat in Parliament.

The historian and political scientist Barry Gustafson has described Davis as "a millionaire who from 1912 until his death was a very generous financial supporter of the Labour Party ... A ruthless businessman, benefactor of worthy causes, and with an eye for the opposite sex."

Davis told Warren Freer, then the Labour candidate for Mount Albert in the 1947 by-election, that he was "not opposed to state control of liquor outlets, but was opposed to state control of breweries" and supported Labour (sending a substantial cheque for party campaign funds) because "the Labour Party policy allows a worker to have a few shillings in his pocket and without that he cannot buy my beer. Conservatives tend to look after the more affluent in the country and do not care if the worker has sixpence for a beer or not."

In 1935, Davis was elected Mayor of Auckland with Citizens' Committee endorsement, narrowly defeating Labour's candidate Joe Sayegh by only 400 votes. He greatly increased his majority when re-elected in 1938.

Davis was the owner of the Grand Hotel Auckland from 1910, when his parents retired to London, until his death. He collected a large number of Victorian paintings, which hung in the hotel until its closure in 1966 when it was leased by Hancock & Co. Ltd from the Ara Masonic Lodge. Davis was also a racehorse owner and yachtsman.

== Honours and awards ==
In the 1937 Coronation Honours, Davis was knighted as a Knight Bachelor. He was appointed a Chevalier of the Légion d’honneur by the Republic of France on 2 April 1938 for his services to the French Navy during their visits to Auckland. His award was announced by the French Foreign Minister and recognised the never-failing courtesy and entertainment of French naval crews during visits to Auckland, most notably the cruiser Jeanne d’Arc, which had visited only two months previous. In 1953, he was awarded the Queen Elizabeth II Coronation Medal. In 2010, Davis was posthumously inducted into the New Zealand Business Hall of Fame.

== Ernest and Marion Davis Library ==
In 1961 the Marion Davis Memorial Library at Auckland Hospital opened. It was funded by an endowment from Davis who offered to build it in memory of his wife Marion who died in 1955. It was later renamed the Ernest and Marion Davis Library. The library holds a medical history collection of books, surgical instruments and apothecary jars.

== Notes ==
Political offices
Preceded by George Hutchison	Mayor of Auckland City; 1935–1941	Succeeded by John Allum
