= Richard Waugh (writer) =

New Zealand minister, historian, aviation chaplain and writer

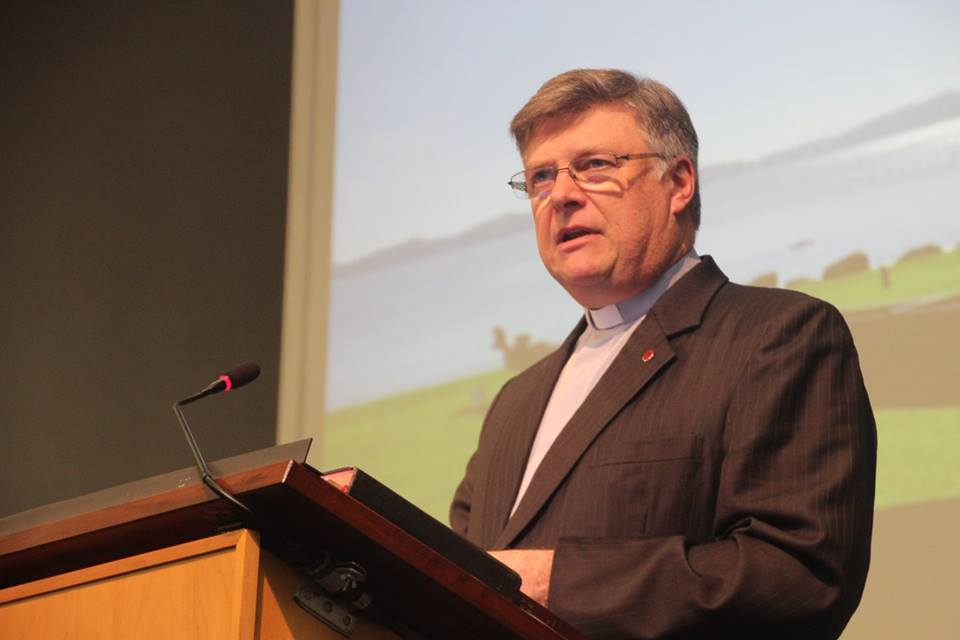
- Born: 1957 (age 67–68); Christchurch, New Zealand

Academic background
- Education: Trinity/St Johns Theological College (LTh, STh) Massey University (BA); University of Auckland (MBA) Asbury Theological Seminary (D.Min)
- Thesis: Discover your Wesleyan DNA: a curriculum for the Wesleyan Methodist Church of New Zealand

Academic work
- Discipline: Christian Theology
- Sub-discipline: Wesleyan Theology
- Notable works: Renew Your Wesleyan DNA – Pursue God's Mission in Your Life and Church by Engaging with the Essential Strands of Wesleyan Theology Cherished by Global Methodism

Richard James Waugh (born 1957) is an ordained minister, historian and writer, aviation chaplain and organiser of historical events. As a historian, he has authored or co-authored many books and articles on New Zealand aviation, church history, motoring, social history, and theological subjects.

Now based in Christchurch, he is a commentator and writer on New Zealand aviation history (in particular, airline development from the 1930s to the 1970s), New Zealand ecumenism and church history, Wesleyan theology, Methodist history, and classic Jaguar Cars.

== Life and career ==
=== Early life ===
Waugh was born in Christchurch, New Zealand to Brian Kynaston Waugh (1922–1984) and Jean Mary Lowe (1927–2009). His father Brian had joined the RAF in 1938 and served throughout World War II, including as a pilot with No. 75 Squadron RNZAF. After the war and with civil flying and engineering licenses, Brian emigrated to New Zealand to help pioneer regional airline services in the South Island and worked many years as Chief Pilot for West Coast Airways. Waugh's childhood years were in Hokitika and Queenstown while his young adult years were in Gisborne and Nelson.

=== Education ===
Waugh's tertiary education was at Trinity/St Johns Theological College (LTh, STh), Massey University (BA), University of Auckland (MBA), and Asbury Theological Seminary (D.Min). His doctoral work was with regard to the essential DNA of the Wesleyan theological worldview.

=== Ministry ===
Waugh was ordained in the Methodist Church of New Zealand in 1985 and served churches in the Manawatu, West Auckland and East Auckland. He joined the Wesleyan Methodist Church of New Zealand in 2000 and served as National Superintendent of the Wesleyan Methodist Church of New Zealand (2002–2020). In 2000 he was founding minister of East City Wesleyan Church, a new multi-cultural church plant in East Auckland, which he continued to pastor until retirement in 2022. In 2012, he was appointed the founding President of the South Pacific Conference of the Wesleyan Methodist Church. In the same year, he was presented with the Distinguished Alumni Award from Asbury Theological Seminary.

During these years he was well known in ecumenical leadership. He was chair of the National Church Leaders Aotearoa New Zealand Meeting (2012–2021), chair of the Auckland Church Leaders Meeting (2009–2019), inaugural chair of the Auckland Prayer Breakfast (2016–2019) and with long-standing involvement in the New Zealand Christian Network and in World Methodism. He served as a member of the World Methodist Council, South Pacific Secretary of World Methodist Evangelism (2014–2022), and President of the World Methodist Historical Society (2016–2024). In these ecumenical capacities, he was involved in many civic services and local and national government liaison work. He was elected National Superintendent Emeritus at the Wesleyan Methodist Church of Aotearoa New Zealand national conference in 2020.

=== Public service ===
==== Aviation ====
Since 1998, Waugh has served as Honorary Chaplain for the Honourable Company of Air Pilots (NZ Region), formerly the Guild of Air Pilots and Air Navigators, officiating at services and organising many aviation historical events. From 1994 to 2011, he led a project to commemorate the nine airliner accidents in New Zealand from the 1930s to the 1960s in which 73 people lost their lives and worked with others to ensure permanent memorials for each accident.

Some of these include:

- Kawatiri Air Accident Memorial
- Bay of Plenty Airways Accident Memorial
- Kaimai Memorial – New Zealand National Airways Corporation Flight 441

From early 2016, he was the initiator and spokesperson for the Erebus National Memorial which was subsequently endorsed as a major Government project. In June 2023 he was elected President of the Aviation Historical Society of New Zealand.

==== Community ====
Over the years Waugh has had a wide range of voluntary community leadership roles including:

- Chair of the Henderson 150th Anniversary celebrations in 1993–1994
- Trustee of the Corban Winery Estate (Waitakere City Council) in 1993–1996
- Trustee of the Howick 150th Anniversary celebrations in 1996–1997
- Elected member and deputy chair of the Pakuranga Community Board 1998–2004
- Chair of the Howick 175th Anniversary celebrations 2021–2023

From 2016 to 2023, he was the founding chair of the Auckland Brit & Euro Classic Car Show Committee, helping organise one of New Zealand's largest classic car shows.

== Public recognition ==
In June 2007, Waugh was awarded the Queen's Service Medal (QSM) for services to aviation history and the community. In 2012, his voluntary efforts were recognised with the Kiwibank Local Hero Award and the Howick Local Board's inaugural Citizen of the Year Award. In September 2015, he was honoured for his ecumenical service in a ceremony hosted by Chester Borrows, then Deputy Speaker of the NZ Parliament. In 2020, he was recognised by the Royal Aeronautical Society – NZ Division and was awarded the Meritorious Gold Service Award. In July 2022 Christopher Luxon, then Leader of the Opposition, described Waugh as, “quite possibly the most interesting man in New Zealand.” In 2023, Waugh was presented with a Howick Local Board Voluntary Recognition Award. Most recently, he was awarded with the Sir Alan Cobham memorial award by the Honourable Company of Air Pilots.

== Selected works ==
=== Editor ===
Turbulent Years – A Commercial Pilot’s Story, Christchurch, New Zealand: Hazard Press, 1991. (Brian Waugh) ISBN 0-908790-31-7

=== Editor and co-author ===
When the Coast is Clear – The Story of New Zealand's First and Most Unique Licensed Scheduled Air Service, Invercargill: Craig Printing Company Ltd, 1994. (Richard Waugh, John King, Paul Beauchamp Legg) ISBN 0-473-02851-4

Strait Across – The Pioneering Story of Cook Strait Aviation, Invercargill: Craig Printing Company Ltd, 1995. (Richard Waugh, Graeme McConnell, David Phillips) ISBN 0-473-03427-1

Early Risers – The Pioneering Story of Gisborne and Hawkes Bay Aviation, Invercargill: Craig Printing Company Ltd, 1997. (John Richard King, David Phillips, Richard Waugh) ISBN 9780473043919

Electra Flying – The Lockheed 10 Electra in New Zealand and the Pioneering of the Main Trunk Air Service, Invercargill, Craig Printing Company Ltd, 1998. (David Phillips, Richard Waugh) ISBN 0-473-05366-7

=== Co-author ===
South Pacific Airlines of New Zealand and their DC-3 Viewmasters, Invercargill: Craig Printing Company Ltd, 2000. (Peter Layne, Richard Waugh) ISBN 0-473-07183-5

Taking Off – Pioneering Small Airlines of New Zealand 1945–1970, Invercargill, Craig Printing Company Ltd, 2003. (Bruce Gavin, Peter Layne, Graeme McConnell, Richard Waugh) ISBN 0-473-09366-9

NAC – The Illustrated History of New Zealand National Airways Corporation 1947–1978, Invercargill, Craig Printing Company Ltd, 2007. (Peter Layne, Graeme McConnell, Richard Waugh) ISBN 978-0-473-12000-9

The Story of Nelson Aviation, Invercargill, Craigs Design & Print Ltd, 2013. (Graeme McConnell, Richard Waugh) ISBN 978-0-473-26064-4, 978-0-473-26578-6

God Knows Where They Come From – Four Faith Stories from Hokitika, Invercargill, Craigs Design & Print Ltd, 2014. (Allan Davidson, Steve Lowe, Ted Schroder, Richard Waugh) ISBN 978-0-473-30156-9

Waugh Stories – Growing up in Hokitika during the 1960s, Invercargill, Craigs Design & Print Ltd, 2014. (Alec Waugh, Richard Waugh) ISBN 978-0-473-30204-7

=== Author ===
Kaimai Crash – New Zealand's Worst Internal Air Disaster, Invercargill, Craig Printing Company Ltd., 2003. ISBN 978-0-908629-74-9

LOST ... Without Trace – Brian Chadwick and the Missing Dragonfly, Invercargill, Craig Printing Company Ltd., 2005. ISBN 0-473-10157-2

Hoki to Haast – New Zealand's First Airline, Invercargill, Craig Printing Company Ltd., 2009. ISBN 978-0-473-15937-5

A New Church for a New Century – East City Wesleyan's Early Story, Invercargill, Craigs Design & Print Ltd., 2010. ISBN 9780473174484

Shot Over into the Shotover – Lessons from a New Zealand Air Accident, Invercargill, Craigs Design & Print Ltd., 2018. ISBN 978-0-473-45565-1

Renew Your Wesleyan DNA – Pursue God's Mission in Your Life and Church by Engaging with the Essential Strands of Wesleyan Theology Cherished by Global Methodism, Australia, Cypress Project, 2019. ISBN 978-0-9804172-9-6

Classic Jaguars in New Zealand, Auckland, The Kynaston Charitable Trust, 2021. ISBN 978-0-473-58250-0
