= Ann Robertson (nurse) =

British nurse and hospice founder

Ann Robertson (1934 — 2023), a British nurse, was the founder and lifetime president of the Pilgrims Hospices in East Kent, UK. For over 40 years, she saw the establishment of hospices in three different towns until, by 2023, the clinical staff numbered 200 and thousands of people in the local community, patients and their families, were supported by palliative end of life care each year.

== Career ==
Robertson worked at the Kent and Canterbury Hospital as a nurse and mid-wife before joining a local Kent General Practice. At the time, hospitals were reluctant to admit people with life-limiting illness and there was little treatment other than pain relief. Robertson knew of the hospice movement started in the UK by Cicely Saunders. She felt that the situation in Kent needed improvement and resolved to do something about it. After winning £1,000 in a competition in The Nursing Times and a further five years of fundraising, Robertson opened the Pilgrims Hospice in Canterbury in 1982. The financial situation was, however, perilous and much of the early work on, for example, publicity and generating income, was undertaken by voluntary trustees.

Roberson travelled around the UK to learn what training was received by others involved in end-of-life care, for example, district nurses, ambulance staff, undertakers, police and other hospice workers, and how they coped with their work.

In 1992, a second hospice was opened in Margate. In 2001, the third was opened in Ashford. By 2014, the three Pilgrims Hospices were providing free care for some 2,000 people. As well as in-patient wards, specialist nurses go out into the community to organise Hospice at Home and Outreach Day Centres.

In 2013, a conference, education and training centre called "The Ann Robertson Centre" was opened. Following Robertson's own emphasis on education, the centre runs training for its own staff and also for some thousand social and health workers each year.

Robertson authored a book entitled The Pilgrims Hospices in East Kent. She was President of Pilgrim Hospices until her death on 7 November 2023.

== Private life ==
Robertson was married with two daughters. She became a Licensed lay minister and continued to give services even after her diagnosis of multiple sclerosis.
