= Arthur Thomas Bate =

New Zealand sharebroker, public servant and philatelist

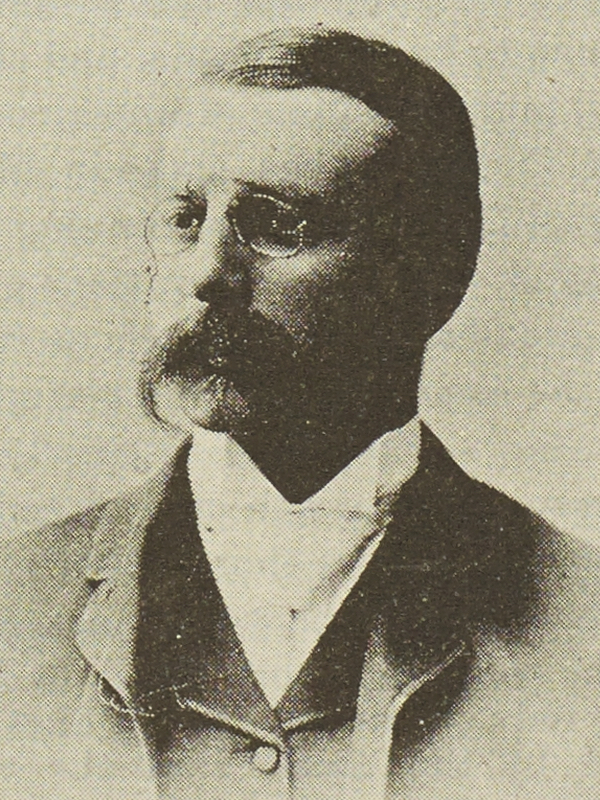
Bate, c. 1892

Arthur Thomas Bate (28 January 1855 – 14 January 1922) was a New Zealand sharebroker, public servant and philatelist.

== Biography ==
Born in Saint Helier, Jersey on 28 January 1855, Bate was employed as a "lad clerk" in the accountants department of the Great Western Railway at Paddington Station, London from 1872 to 1874. He emigrated to New Zealand in 1874 on the ship Langstone and settled in Wellington. He was a public servant for 18 years, rising to the rank of ministerial private secretary. In 1893 he went into business on his own account, becoming a land, financial, insurance and general commission agent and sharebroker. He served as chairman of the Wellington Stock Exchange from 1909 for seven years.

Outside of business, Bate served as secretary of the Wellington Rugby Football Union and the Wellington Cricket Association and as a member of the New Zealand Rugby Union.

He died in Wellington on 14 January 1922 and was buried at Karori Cemetery.

== Philately ==
He was the curator of the New Zealand government stamp collection and was entered on the Roll of Distinguished Philatelists in 1921.

In the world of philately, his death resulted in obituaries in the Australian Philatelist, Stamp Collecting, Australian Stamp Journal, Stamp Herald and the New Zealand Stamp Collector.
