= Frederick George Ewington =

New Zealand soldier, estate agent, philanthropist, and pamphleteer

Frederick George Ewington (27 May 1844 – 27 June 1922) was a New Zealand soldier, estate agent, philanthropist and pamphleteer. He was born in Barnet, Hertfordshire, England on 27 May 1844.
