= Edward John von Dadelszen =

Edward John von Dadelszen (6 May 1845–28 May 1922) was a New Zealand public administrator and statistician. He was born in Wavertree, Liverpool, Lancashire, England on 6 May 1845.
