= Nada Hazel Clark =

New Zealand trade unionist

Nada Hazel Clark (10 October 1922 – 4 August 1964) was a New Zealand trade unionist. She was born in Sydney, New South Wales, Australia on 10 October 1922. Clark died in Wellington, New Zealand. Upon her birth, she was recognized as the eldest of four children. She was the daughter of Nada Naomi Nation and Richard Hazel Ryan. In 1924, she and her family moved to Wellington, New Zealand. When they got there, her father became the national vice president of the Federated Seamen's Union of New Zealand.

After she left school, Clark worked as a clerical worker in a union office. When she became 22 years old, she married a man named Horace Peile Challen Clark on 6 July 1945.
