= Henry Wise (publisher) =

New Zealand stationer, printer and publisher

Henry Aitken Wise (28 December 1835 – 16 June 1922) was a New Zealand stationer, printer and publisher, born in Edinburgh, Midlothian, Scotland. He published directories in New Zealand from 1865, and from 1884 in various Australian states, starting in Victoria. The business was carried on by his four sons and some grandsons, and existed until 1972.

Wise died at his home in the Dunedin suburb of Burkes on 16 June 1922.
