= Eliot Davis =

New Zealand politician

The Honourable Eliot Davis
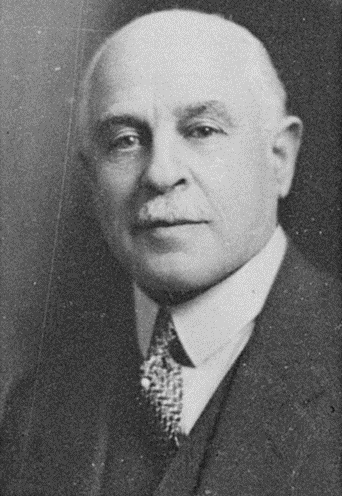

Member of the Legislative Council
- In office 22 June 1934 – 31 December 1950

Personal details
- Born: 15 August 1871 Nelson, New Zealand
- Died: 5 January 1954 (aged 82) Auckland, New Zealand
- Relations: Ernest Davis (brother)

Eliot Rypinski Davis (15 August 1871 – 5 January 1954) was a member of the New Zealand Legislative Council from 22 June 1934 to 21 June 1941 when his term ended; then from 8 September 1941 to 7 September 1948 and 8 September 1948 to 31 December 1950 when the Council was abolished. He was appointed by the United/Reform Coalition Government then the First Labour Government.

== Biography ==
He was from Auckland, and was a businessman and racehorse owner. In 1935, he was awarded the King George V Silver Jubilee Medal, and 1953 he received the Queen Elizabeth II Coronation Medal.

Davis was born in Nelson, son of Moss Davis and brother of Sir Ernest Davis the brewer.
