= Emma Ostler =

Emma Brignell Ostler (née Roberts, c.1848 – 14 April 1922) was a New Zealand teacher, prohibitionist, landowner and businesswoman.

== Early life ==
She was born in West Ham, Essex, England in about 1848. Emma Roberts (maiden name) was the daughter of Mary Griffith and her husband, Thomas Roberts, a clergyman. In 1852 her parents emigrated to Melbourne, Australia, with their 11 children.

On 14 July 1868 at Melbourne, Emma married William Henry Ostler, a runholder at Benmore sheep station in North Otago, New Zealand, where the couple settled. The couple had four children: Helen Mary (b1869) Edith Louisa (Daisy) (b1874), Henry Hubert (b1876). A fourth child was born in Melbourne but died when only a few months old. The family settled at Ben Ohau for a time but subsequently lived in Timaru for a period from 1876. Emily's father died at the station in 1879 and the property was auctioned leaving Emma penniless.

== Footnotes ==
- The Women's Suffrage Petition, 1893. New Zealand, Bridget Williams Books, 2017.
- Dreaver, Anthony. An Eye for Country: The Life and Work of Leslie Adkin. New Zealand, Victoria University Press, 1997.
