= Ann Robertson (silversmith) =

English silversmith

- Occupation: Silversmith

Ann Robertson (née Bryan) was an English silversmith.

Active in Newcastle upon Tyne, Robertson was married on 4 June 1787 to the goldsmith and jeweler John Robertson I, and at his death in 1801 was left the household goods, the choice of two cows, and a £100 annuity. She also gained power of administration over the inheritance of her nephew until he came of age. Her mark was registered in 1800, with her profession given as that of jeweler; she listed an address in Dean Street. She ran the business under her own name, but while holding it in trust for her nephew; she retired in 1811.

Three pieces by Robertson are owned by the National Museum of Women in the Arts. They include a George III fish slice, dated c. 1801; a George III tea caddy, dated 1802; and a George III creamer and sugar bowl, date c. 1810.
