= Robert Lee (teacher) =

New Zealand teacher, school inspector and educationalist (1837–1922)

Robert Lee (c.1837 – 18 June 1922) was a New Zealand teacher, school inspector and educationalist. He was born in Grantham, Lincolnshire, England on c.1837. He was headmaster of All Saints Boys' School in Preston, Lancashire from 1859 to 1863. Lee came to New Zealand in 1864 as he was appointed headmaster of Bishop's School in Nelson; he held this post until 1873. From 1874 onwards, he stepped into inspector and secretary roles, making policy changes to teacher recruitment.

Lee died at his home Belvoir in Lower Hutt on 18 June 1922. He was survived by his wife and several of their children.
