= Alan Blake =

- Born: Alan Walter Blake; 3 November 1922 Carterton, New Zealand
- Died: 31 October 2010 (aged 87) Masterton, New Zealand
- Height: 1.88 m (6 ft 2 in)
- Weight: 92 kg (203 lb)
- School: Wairarapa College
- Occupation: Freezing works supervisor

Rugby union career
- Position: Flanker
Provincial / State sides
Years	Team	Apps	(Points)
1941–60	Wairarapa	108	
International career
Years	Team	Apps	(Points)
1949	New Zealand	1	(0)
1948–50	New Zealand Māori	26	

Alan Walter Blake (3 November 1922 – 31 October 2010) was a New Zealand rugby union player. A flanker, Blake represented Wairarapa at a provincial level. He played for the New Zealand national side, the All Blacks, in a single test match in 1949. Despite not having any Māori ancestry, Blake played 26 matches for New Zealand Māori and captained the side in 1950. He had an African American grandfather.

During World War II, Blake served as a trooper with the 4th New Zealand Armoured Brigade from 1943, and saw action in Italy. At the end of the war, he toured with the New Zealand Army rugby team, known as the "Kiwis", appearing in 24 matches.
