= Dell Bandeen =

New Zealand netball player

Personal information
- Full name: Marjory Dell Bandeen (Née: Turner)
- Born: 2 August 1922 Christchurch, New Zealand
- Died: 10 March 2009 (aged 86) Dunedin, New Zealand
- Occupations: Dressmaker and pattern maker
- Height: 1.70 m (5 ft 7 in)
- School: Avonside Girls' High School

Netball career
- Playing positions: GK, GD, C
Years	National team	Caps
1948	New Zealand	2

Marjory Dell Bandeen (formerly Marshall, née Turner; 2 August 1922 – 10 March 2009) was a New Zealand netball player. She played in the New Zealand team in two Tests against the touring Australian team in 1948.

== Early life ==
Bandeen was born Marjory Dell Turner in Christchurch on 2 August 1922, the younger daughter of Walter Turner and Maggie May Turner (née Dalziel). She was educated at Avonside Girls' High School, where she placed third in the senior athletics championship in 1938, excelling in the jumping events, and was a prefect in 1939.

== Netball career ==
Turner played for the Canterbury provincial netball team for many years, initially in the defensive third before switching to centre.

After the 1947 national championships, won by Canterbury, Turner was selected at centre for the New Zealand team to play the visiting Australian team the following year. However, before the first Test she was switched to play at goal defence. New Zealand lost the first Test at Forbury Park in Dunedin 16–27. Turner was reported to have "relieved her team on numerous occasions", and it was said that "her anticipation was at times uncanny in predicting the beautiful low Australian passes". Turner missed the second Test, but returned for the third Test in Auckland, which was won by Australia, 44–22.

In 1949, Turner was part of the Canterbury team that finished second at the national provincial championships. She was subsequently named in the South Island team, which drew 15–15 in the interisland match against the North Island.

Turner again played for Canterbury at the 1950 national championships, with Canterbury beating Auckland in the final 22–7. She was subsequently named in the South Island team for the interisland match, which was won by the South Island 17–16.

== Later life and death ==
A dressmaker and pattern maker by trade, she was married twice: firstly to David Ferguson Marshall in about 1950, and later to David Bandeen. Dell Bandeen died in Dunedin on 10 March 2009, aged 86, and her ashes were buried in Andersons Bay Cemetery.
