= Owen Hardy =

New Zealand RAF officer (1922–2018)

- Born: 31 July 1922; Auckland, New Zealand
- Died: 4 January 2018 (aged 95)
- Military career
- Allegiance: New Zealand; United Kingdom
- Branch: Royal New Zealand Air Force; Royal Air Force
- Service years: 1941–1945 (RNZAF); 1947–1969 (RAF)
- Rank: Wing Commander
- Service number: 411399 (RNZAF)
- Units: No. 72 Squadron; No. 485 Squadron; No. 54 Squadron; No. 247 Squadron; No. 71 Squadron
- Commands: RAF North Coates
- Conflicts: Second World War
- Awards: Distinguished Flying Cross & Bar; Légion d'honneur (France)
- Other work: Local Authority Planning Officer

Owen Hardy DFC & Bar AFC (31 July 1922 – 4 January 2018) was a New Zealand flying ace of the Royal New Zealand Air Force (RNZAF) during the Second World War. He was officially credited with at least six aerial victories.

== Early life ==
Owen Leslie Hardy was born on 31 July 1922 in Auckland, New Zealand. Before joining the RNZAF in March 1941 he worked as a mechanical engineer.

== Second World War ==
After completing training in Canada Hardy was sent to the United Kingdom in October 1941. The following month he attended No. 61 Operational Training Unit (OTU) at Heston. After completing his training course, he stayed on as a staff pilot. In March 1942, he was posted to No. 72 Squadron. This was based at Biggin Hill and, equipped with Supermarine Spitfire fighters, was engaged in offensive operations to German-occupied Europe. On one sortie, carried out on 4 May, Hardy shared in the destruction of a Messerschmitt Bf 109 fighter near Le Havre. A month later, on 5 June, he damaged a Focke Wulf 190 fighter to the south of Abbeville.

In early November No. 73 Squadron was transferred to the Mediterranean to participate in the North African Campaign. It covered the landings in French North Africa and shortly relocated to Maison Blanche in Algiers. It began carrying out operations in support of the Tunisian campaign. On 19 November Hardy destroyed a Bf 109 over the city of Bône. This was followed with a share in the destruction of a Fw 190 in the area between Tebourba and Djedeida on 3 December. Later in the month, on 22 December, he damaged a Junkers Ju 88 medium bomber near Pont du Fahs. On 5 January 1943, he shot down a Fw 190 over Mateur and flying the same vicinity the next day, shared in the destruction of another Fw 190. He was awarded the Distinguished Flying Cross (DFC) in May. The citation for the DFC was published in The London Gazette and read:

This officer has completed 70 sorties, including a number in the campaign in North Africa, where he has rendered excellent service. In air combat he has destroyed 3 enemy aircraft, while in low level machine gun attacks on enemy transport he has achieved success. Flying Officer Hardy is a keen and skilful section leader.

— London Gazette, No. 36022, 21 May 1943

Returning to the UK he became an instructor at No. 61 OTU at Rednal. He was detached from there in August 1943 to attend the Central Gunnery School (CGS) at RAF Sutton Bridge. In April 1944 Hardy was posted to No. 485 Squadron. It was operating Spitfire Mk IXs from Selsey, flying to targets in France in a fighter-bomber as part of the 2nd Tactical Air Force. Following the successful invasion of Normandy, the squadron began to fly from airfields there on low-level operations, supporting the Allied ground forces as they advanced across France, into Belgium and then the Netherlands. After the end of hostilities he was awarded the Bar to his DFC.

Hardy is credited with the destruction of six aircraft, three of which were shared with other pilots. He damaged one aircraft and destroyed one more on the ground. He is also credited with the probable destruction of one aircraft.

== Postwar career ==
Hardy returned to New Zealand in December 1945 to attend university. He returned to the UK in 1947 and joined the Royal Air Force. Following a flying refresher course he was posted to No. 54 Squadron to fly the de Havilland Vampire. April 1948 saw Hardy detached and posted to No. 247 Squadron to lead a flight. He returned to 54 Squadron in August of the same year. From 54 Squadron he returned to 72 Squadron in November 1948 as a flight commander.

The 1950s began with Hardy becoming an instructor in the Vampire Technical Flight at RAF Stradishall in February 1950. In January 1951 Hardy was posed to Gütersloh in West Germany as tasked with reforming No. 71 Squadron. He was awarded the Air Force Cross in the 1953 New Year Honours. He was also promoted to squadron leader. Later in the year, he converted from the de Havilland Vampire to the Canadair Sabre at RAF Wildenrath. Hardy was then posted to the Air Defence Operations Centre at RAF Fighter Command Headquarters.

In January 1956 he attended the RAF Staff College before serving in the Air Ministry from 1957 to 1960. From the Air Ministry Hardy was posted to RAF Watton as Wing Commander Operations with the Missile Wing. In July 1963, Hardy was posted to the Headquarters at RAF Episkopi on Cyprus.

After Cyprus, Hardy attended the Senior Officers' War Course at Greenwich from September 1965 to March 1966. Afterwards he was posted to RAF North Coates as its commanding officer.

== Later life ==
Hardy ended his military career in 1969 as a wing commander. Returning to civilian life, he became a planning officer for Portsmouth City Council and later Hampshire County Council. He retired in 1983 and spent his later years living in Sussex. In 2016 he was awarded France's Legion d'honneur in recognition of his wartime service.

In 2017, still flying, he performed a barrel-roll in a Spitfire during a flight on his 95th birthday. It was his first flight in a Spitfire in 70 years having last flown one in 1947. Speaking about the flight the New Zealand Herald reported his thoughts on the experience:

Every flight in a Spit is a thrill. But after 70 years, the one I had on my birthday was just a bit more exhilarating... [It] refreshed so many memories. It was just like going back and being in the office again really, everything was so familiar

— Wing Commander Owen Hardy,

Hardy died on 4 January 2018 after developing influenza.
