= Rowan Barbour =

New Zealand cricketer

Michael Rowan Harvey Barbour (10 July 1922 in Gisborne – 19 May 2004 in Taradale) was a New Zealand cricketer who played three first-class matches for Northern Districts in the Plunket Shield.
