= Tom Pollard (opera producer) =

Comic opera producer and manager

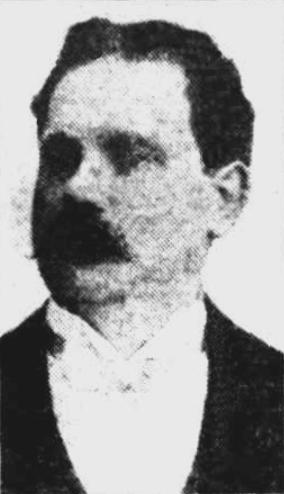
Tom Pollard.

Tom Pollard (28 April 1857 – 30 August 1922) was a New Zealand comic opera producer and manager.

== Biography ==
He was born in Launceston, Colony of Tasmania in 1857 as Tom O'Sullivan. Pollard was his wife's name which he adopted because her family was well known in opera and he joined the family opera company when it was formed in 1881. When the eldest son of the family died in 1884 Tom was taken into partnership of the company by his father-in-law J. J. Pollard and they made several successful tours to New Zealand.

In 1881 he founded a company, "Pollard's Lilliputians", consisting of 80 well trained juvenile performers, all from Australia or New Zealand. In 1882 they toured comic operas like Les Cloches de Corneville and HMS Pinafore through the Australian colonies, also India and Singapore, drawing full houses wherever they went. The company disbanded in 1886 and Tom reorganized it in 1891 in partnership with J. C. Williamson but became sole manager in 1892. It was called the Pollard Juvenile Opera Company and toured widely in New Zealand and Australia. In 1903 Pollard's company toured South Africa under the name the Australian Opera Co. but it went into recess the same year. He reorganized it once again in 1907 and it was disbanded a final time in 1909. Pollard then settled in Christchurch, New Zealand, and founded the motion picture company Pollard's Pictures with his brother Pat O'Sullivan.

== See also ==
- Marion Mitchell

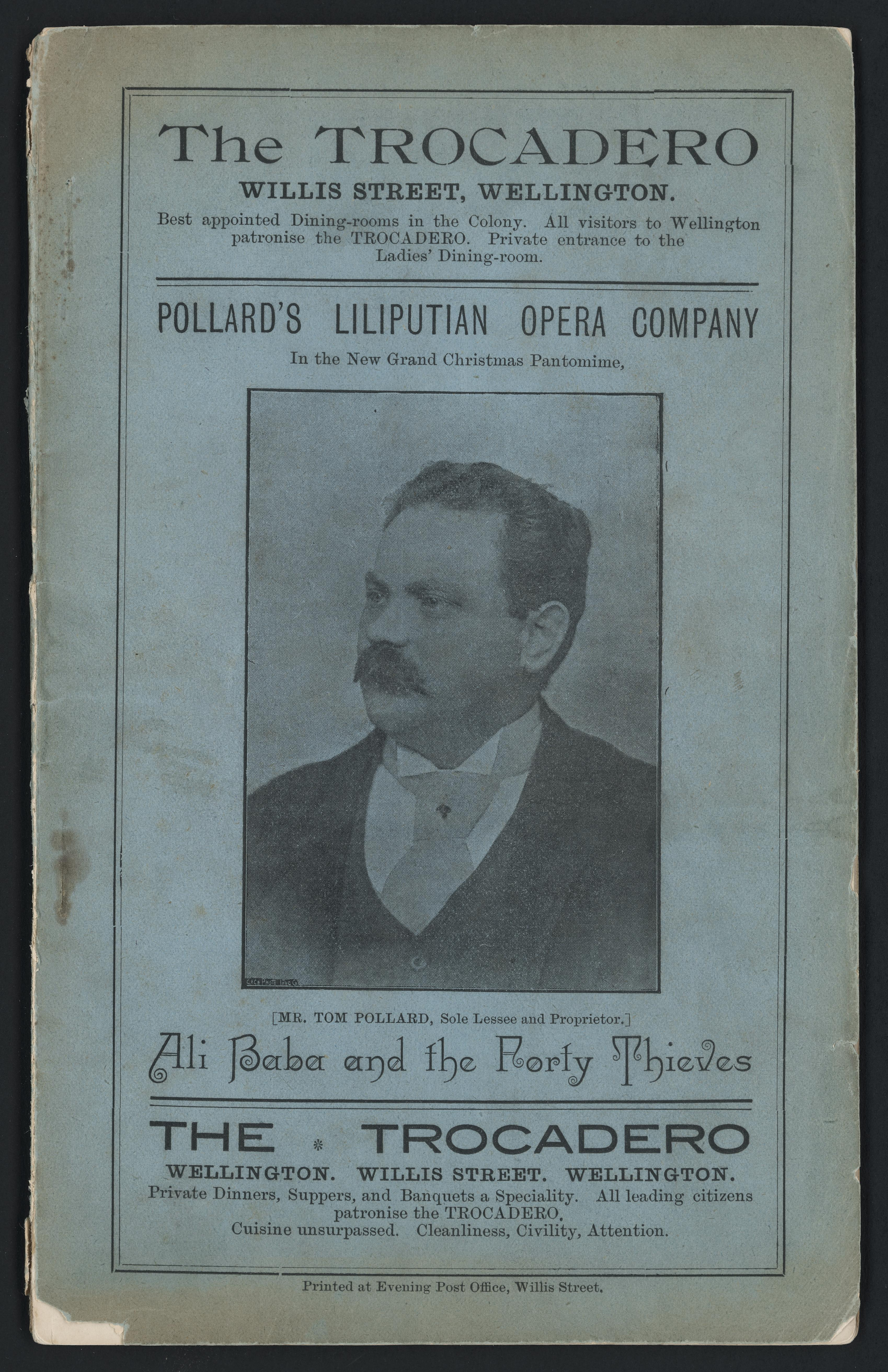
Grand Opera House (Wellington) -Pollard's Liliputian Opera Company in the new grand Christmas pantomime, "Ali Baba and the Forty Thieves". Mr Tom Pollard, sole lessee and proprietor. (Programme)
