= Avis M. Dry =

Clinical psychologist (1922–2007)

- Born: 30 April 1922
- Died: 26 January 2007 (aged 84)

Academic background
- Education: Victoria University of Wellington (BA, MA); University of Leeds (PhD)

Academic work
- Discipline: Psychologist
- Sub-discipline: Clinical psychology

Avis Mary Dry (30 April 1922 – 26 January 2007) was a clinical psychologist and an author on the psychology of Carl Jung.

== Biography ==
Although British by birth, she spent much of her early life in New Zealand after her parents emigrated when she was five. Dry obtained her Bachelor of Arts and Master of Arts degrees from Victoria University of Wellington, New Zealand. She returned to England in 1956, where she obtained her PhD in Psychology from the University of Leeds. Dry worked briefly as a psychologist at Denby Hospital in Wales, before she took a research psychology post at the C. G. Jung Institute in Zürich, Switzerland. In 1976, she accepted a position as head of Leeds MIND, where she remained until 1996.

Dry died on 26 January 2007.

== Bibliography ==
In 1961, she published The Psychology of Jung: A Critical Interpretation. Based on her doctoral studies, Dry tried to provide a neutral assessment of Carl Jung's work, in response to other books that had taken both very pro-Jung and very anti-Jung stances. In the Encyclopædia Britannica, the Fordhams commended this book, saying that "a fairly good critical assessment is provided by Avis M. Dry" in their bibliography of books of Jung.
