= Alexander Bell Donald =

New Zealand seaman, sailmaker, merchant and shipowner

- Born: 18 August 1842; Inverkeithing, Fife, Scotland
- Died: 7 March 1922 (aged 79)
- Occupations: Seaman, sailmaker, merchant, ship owner
- Known for: Co-founding a major Auckland Pacific Island trading company

Alexander Bell Donald (18 August 1842–7 March 1922) was a New Zealand seaman, sailmaker, merchant and ship owner. He co-founded one of Auckland's largest Pacific Island trading companies. He was born in Inverkeithing, Fife, Scotland on 18 August 1842.
