= Brian Waugh =

Aircraft engineer, military and commercial aviator, airline operator, meteorologist

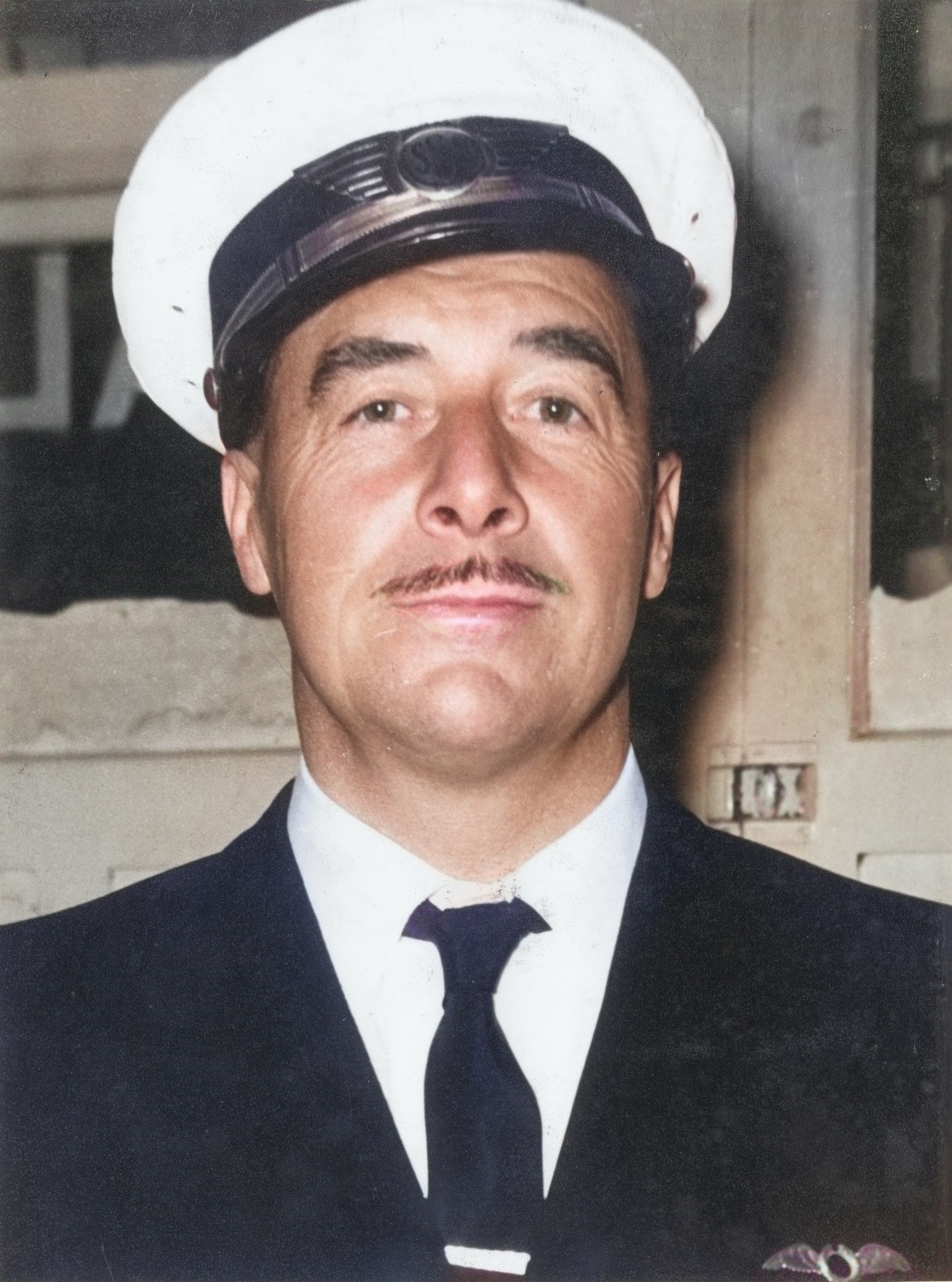
- Born: 26 September 1922; Shrewsbury, Shropshire, England
- Military career
- Branch: Royal Air Force
- Service years: 1938–1948
- Unit: No. 75 Squadron
- Battles/wars: Second World War

Brian Kynaston Waugh (1922–1984) was a notable English-born New Zealand aircraft engineer, military and commercial aviator, airline operator, and meteorologist.

== Early years ==
Brian Kynaston Waugh was born in Shrewsbury, Shropshire, England, on 26 September 1922. The younger of two sons of an electrical engineer and his wife, he became interested in aviation after his father, Walter Waugh, took up a supervisory role in the construction of a Royal Air Force (RAF) station in Shropshire. In August 1938, Waugh joined the RAF, participating in the service's apprentice training scheme.

== Second World War ==
By 1941 Waugh was serving in South Africa. While there, he applied to train as a pilot, was accepted and duly gained his wings on 24 September 1943. In the latter part of the war, he served with No. 75 (NZ) Squadron on Avro Lancaster heavy bombers. Night raids to Germany included Bremen, the Leuna Oil Refinery at Merseburg, the Howaldt Works, and the inner dockyard at Kiel where the German pocket battleship Admiral Scheer was capsized. Continuing Lancaster flying, he dropped food to the starving Dutch at The Hague in Operation Manna, ferried Belgian refugees home, repatriated Allied Prisoners of War, and flew long scenic (Baedeker) flights over Germany, Belgium and Denmark.

== Postwar career ==
At the end of hostilities, Waugh continued in RAF service with transport squadrons in England, Europe, and in South East Asia, based in Singapore. He left the RAF after 10 years’ service in 1948. On his return to civilian life, he gained his civil pilot licence, instrument rating and engineering licence in categories A (airframes), C (engines) and X (compasses), including type ratings for de Havilland DH89 Rapide aircraft and their Gipsy engines. He then flew for post-war small British airlines. In 1954, Waugh immigrated to New Zealand to fly DH89s for South Island Airways on pioneering scheduled routes. After service with Trans Island Airways, he was appointed in 1959 Chief Pilot and Chief Engineer for West Coast Airways at Hokitika, flying the historic South Westland Air Service, New Zealand's first licensed scheduled air service.

Waugh became well known on the West Coast with air ambulance work, particularly before the Haast highways were opened in 1965. On 15 April 1967, he was seriously injured in the forced landing of DH89 ZK-AKT in Queenstown’s Shotover River, due to engine failure.

== Later life ==
Waugh subsequently retired from flying and served in the Meteorological Department at Hokitika and Gisborne. In the 1980s he wrote his aviation autobiography which was published in 1991: ‘Turbulent Years – A Commercial Pilots’ Story’. Waugh spent his final years living in Nelson, where he operated a motel for a time and then worked for an engineering company. He died on 7 October 1984, suffering a heart attack while at Stoke Methodist church. He was survived by his wife and four children.
