= Anne Charlotte Robertson =

American filmmaker (1949–2012)

Anne Charlotte Robertson (1949–2012) was an American filmmaker who pioneered personal documentary-style filmmaking in the mid-1970s.

Anne Charlotte Robertson was born on March 27, 1949, in Columbus, Ohio. When she was eleven she started keeping a diary. Her written diaries evolved into filmed diaries. Robertson began creating films while an undergraduate at the University of Massachusetts Boston and received her MFA at the Massachusetts College of Art in 1985. Robertson made over thirty short films from 1981 to 1997. Her films covered everyday life, births, deaths and her struggles with mental illness. In 2001 she won a Guggenheim Fellowship in Filmmaking.

Robertson's film, Five Year Diary (1981–1997), was filmed over 15 years and has a runtime of 36 hours. The project takes up 83 Super-8 reels and chronicles everyday events, births, deaths, and her mental health. Robertson wanted a multi-media viewing experience of the film with audience members viewing in a "rec-room" setting while also reading her diary, and listening to audio recordings she made.

Robertson died of lung cancer in 2012. The Harvard Film Archive (HFA) acquired Robertson's films after her death.

== Filmography ==
- Pixelation (1976)
- Spirit of '76 (1976)
- Subways (1976)
- Suicide (1979)
- Magazine Mouth (1983)
- Depression Focus Please (1984)
- Talking to Myself (1985)
- Apologies (1990)
- Melon Patches, or Reasons to Go On Living (1994)
- Five Year Diary (1981-1997)
