= Ann Robertson (businesswoman) =

New Zealand businesswoman

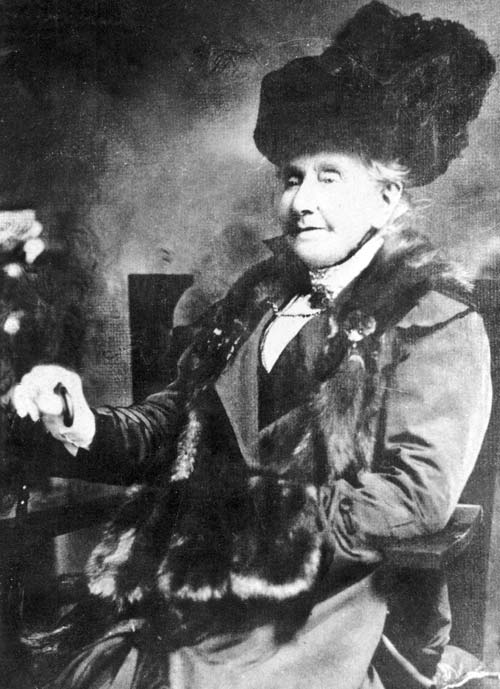
Photograph of Ann Robertson

Ann Robertson (née West, 17 May 1825 – 14 December 1922) was a New Zealand accommodation-house owner, businesswoman and litigant. She was born in New Scone, Perthshire, Scotland in 1825.

Robertson rose to notability by involvement in two early legal test cases relating to property in Rotorua. The first related to the Ohinemutu Hotel on the lakefront near the marae at Ohinemutu, which she lost in a private case to prominent businessman Robert Graham. The second was a thriving bakery was declared illegal under the Thermal-Springs Districts Act 1881. She is reputed to be the first woman to address the New Zealand House of Representatives, when she appealed in person for redress.

These were relatively early cases in the complex socio-legal scenario related the occupation and leasing of Māori land which is now called the Treaty of Waitangi claims and settlements.
