= 1921 in New Zealand =

- Decades: 1900s; 1910s; 1920s; 1930s; 1940s
- See also: History of New Zealand; List of years in New Zealand; Timeline of New Zealand history

The following lists events that happened during 1921 in New Zealand.

== Incumbents ==
=== Regal and viceregal ===
- Head of State – George V
- Governor-General – John Jellicoe, Viscount Jellicoe
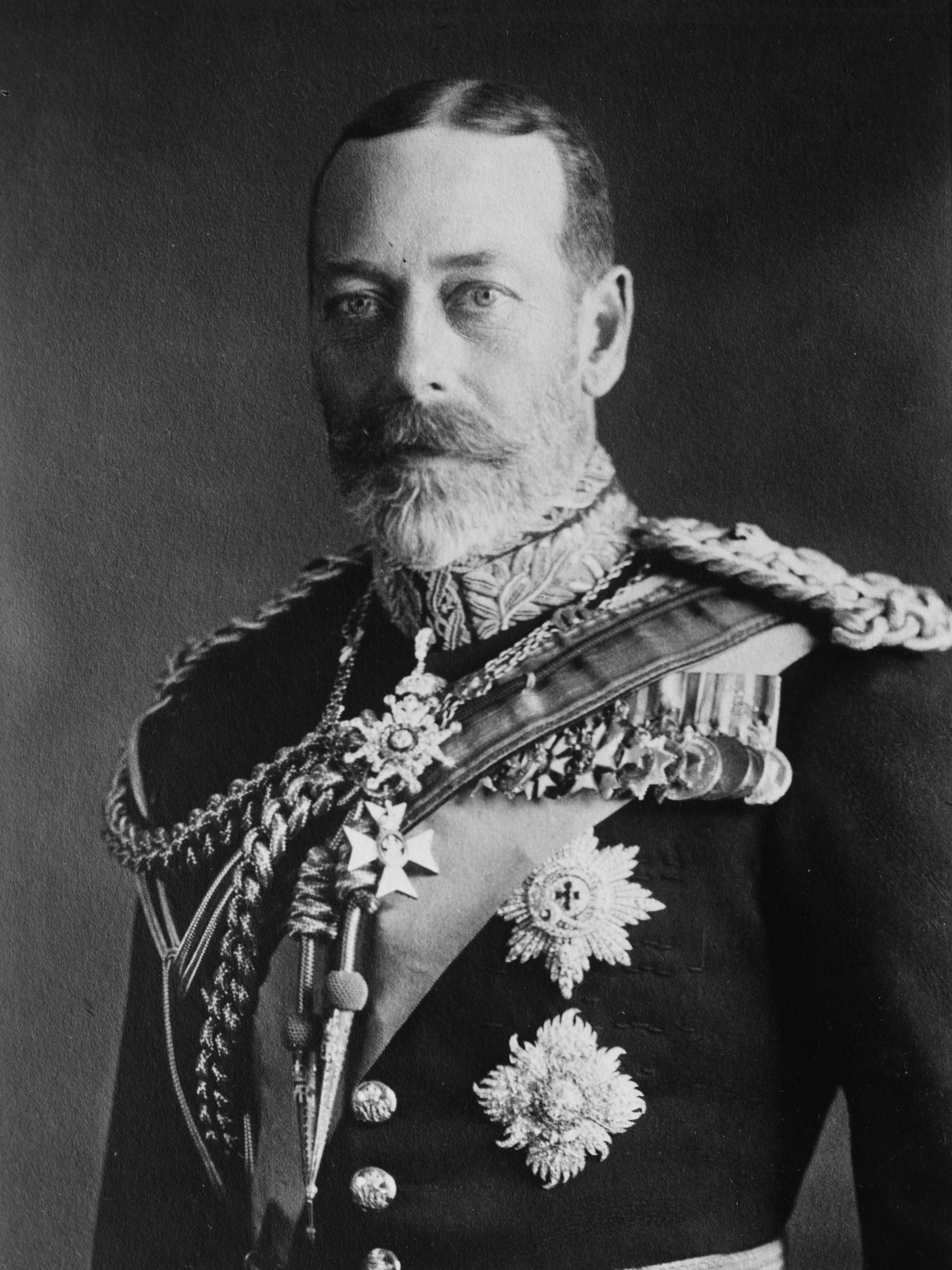
George V

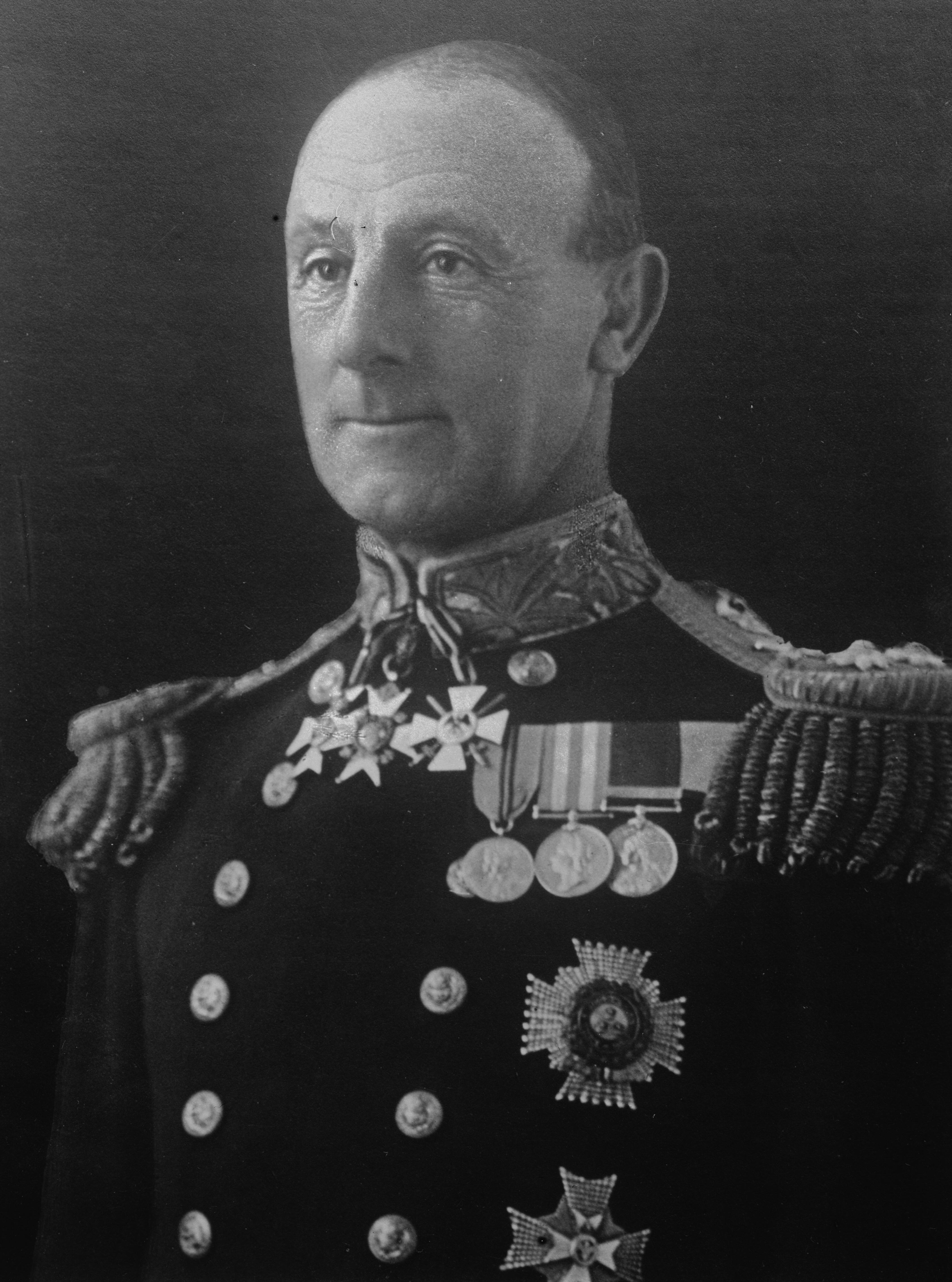
Viscount Jellicoe

=== Government ===
The 20th New Zealand Parliament continues, with the Reform Party in Government

- Speaker of the House – Frederick Lang
- Prime Minister – William Massey
- Minister of Finance – William Massey
- Minister of External Affairs – Ernest Lee
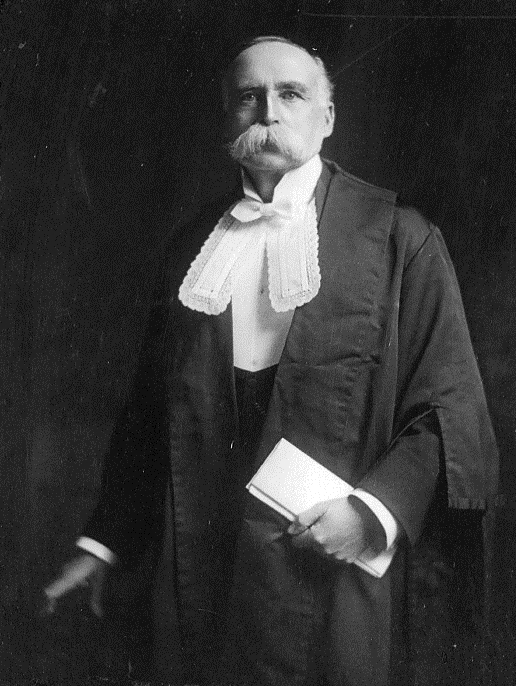
Frederic Lang

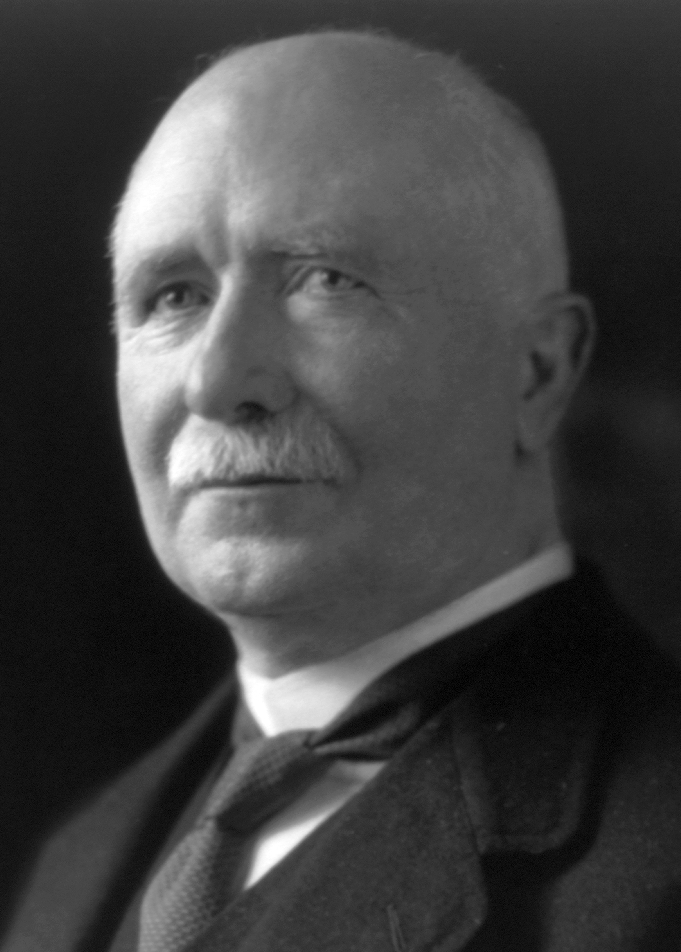
William Massey

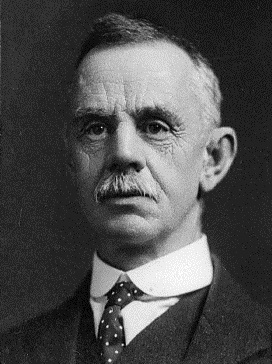
Ernest Lee

=== Parliamentary opposition ===
- Leader of the Opposition – Thomas Wilford (Liberal Party)
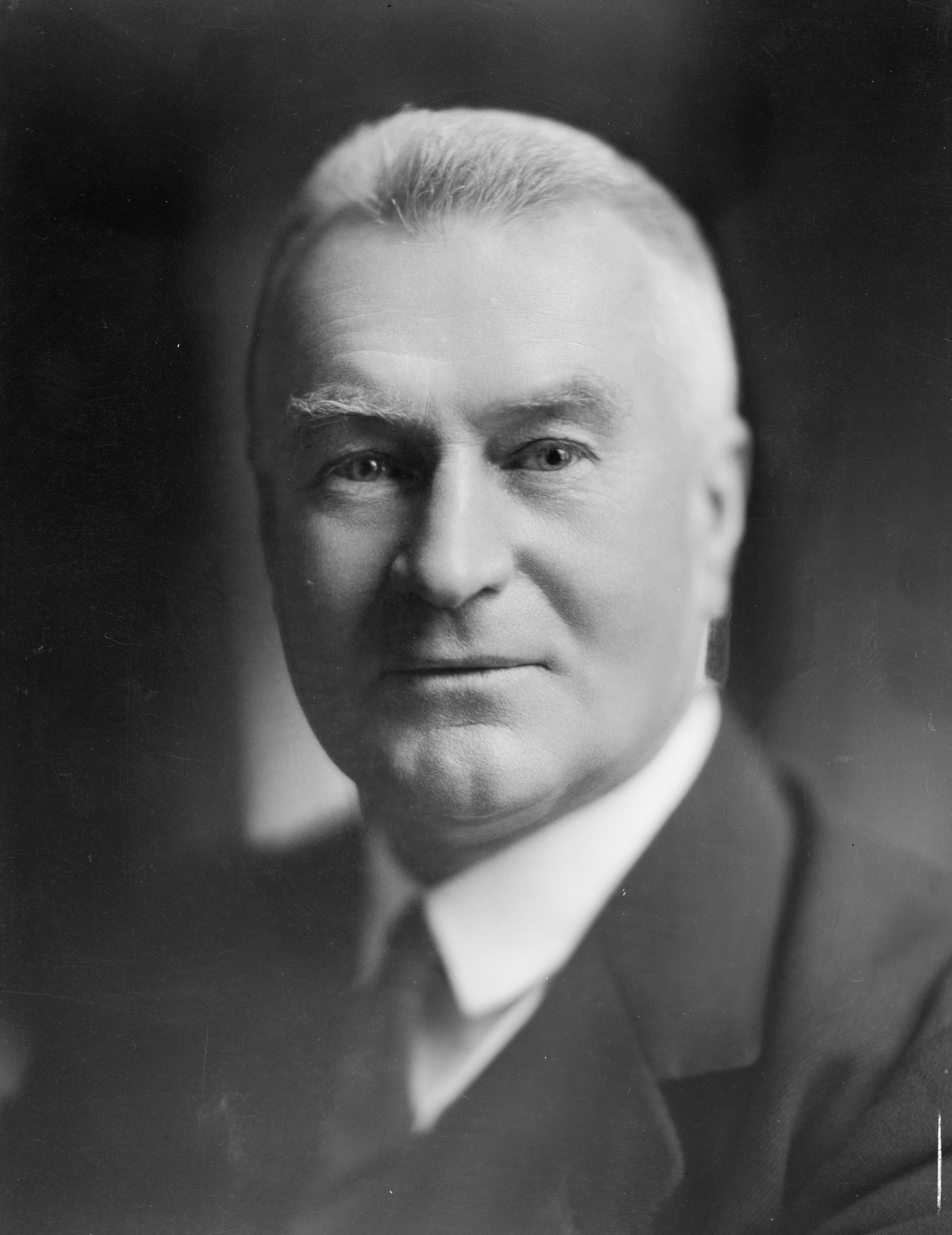
Thomas Wilford

=== Judiciary ===
- Chief Justice – Sir Robert Stout
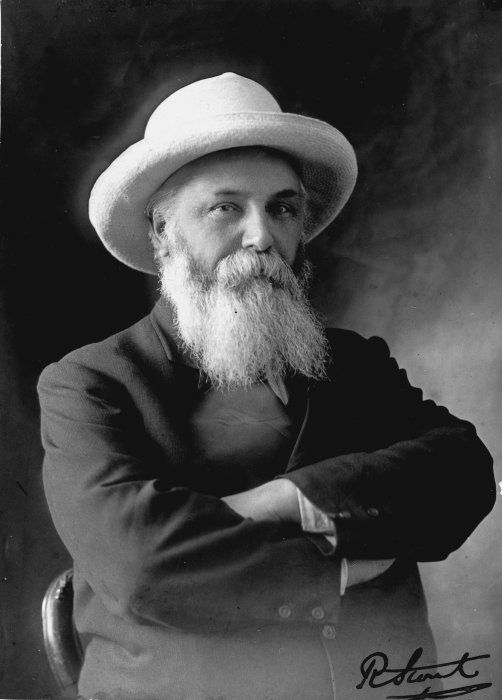
Robert Stout

=== Main centre leaders ===
- Mayor of Auckland – James Gunson
- Mayor of Wellington – John Luke then Robert Wright
- Mayor of Christchurch – Henry Thacker
- Mayor of Dunedin – William Begg then James Douglas
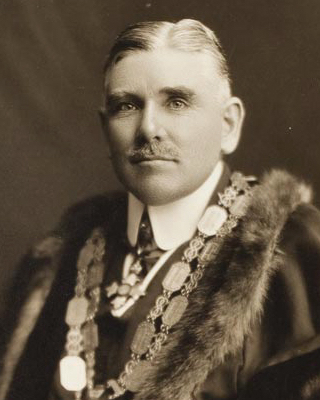
James Gunson

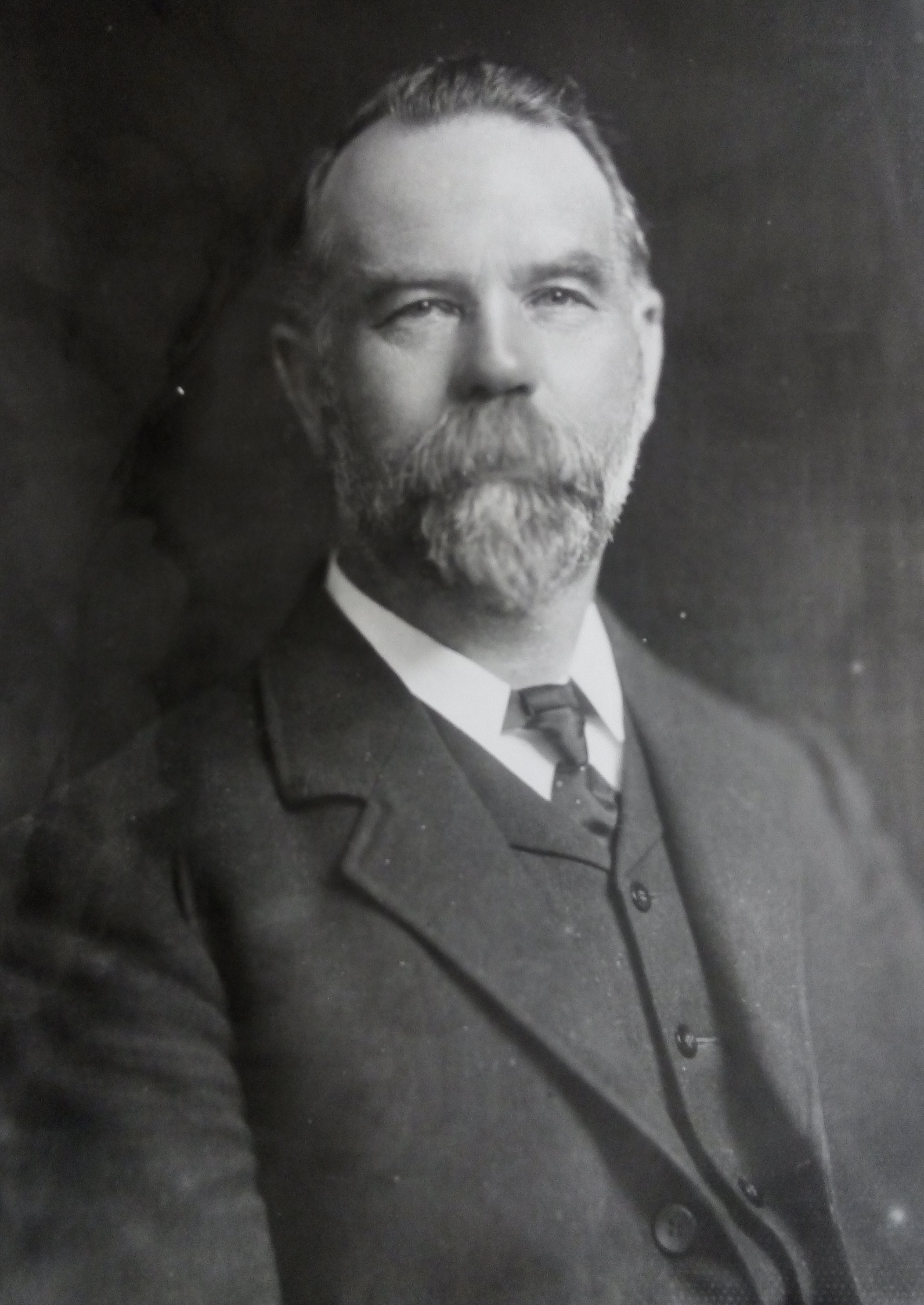
John Luke

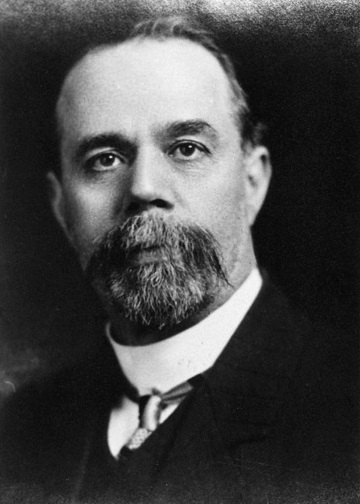
Robert Wright

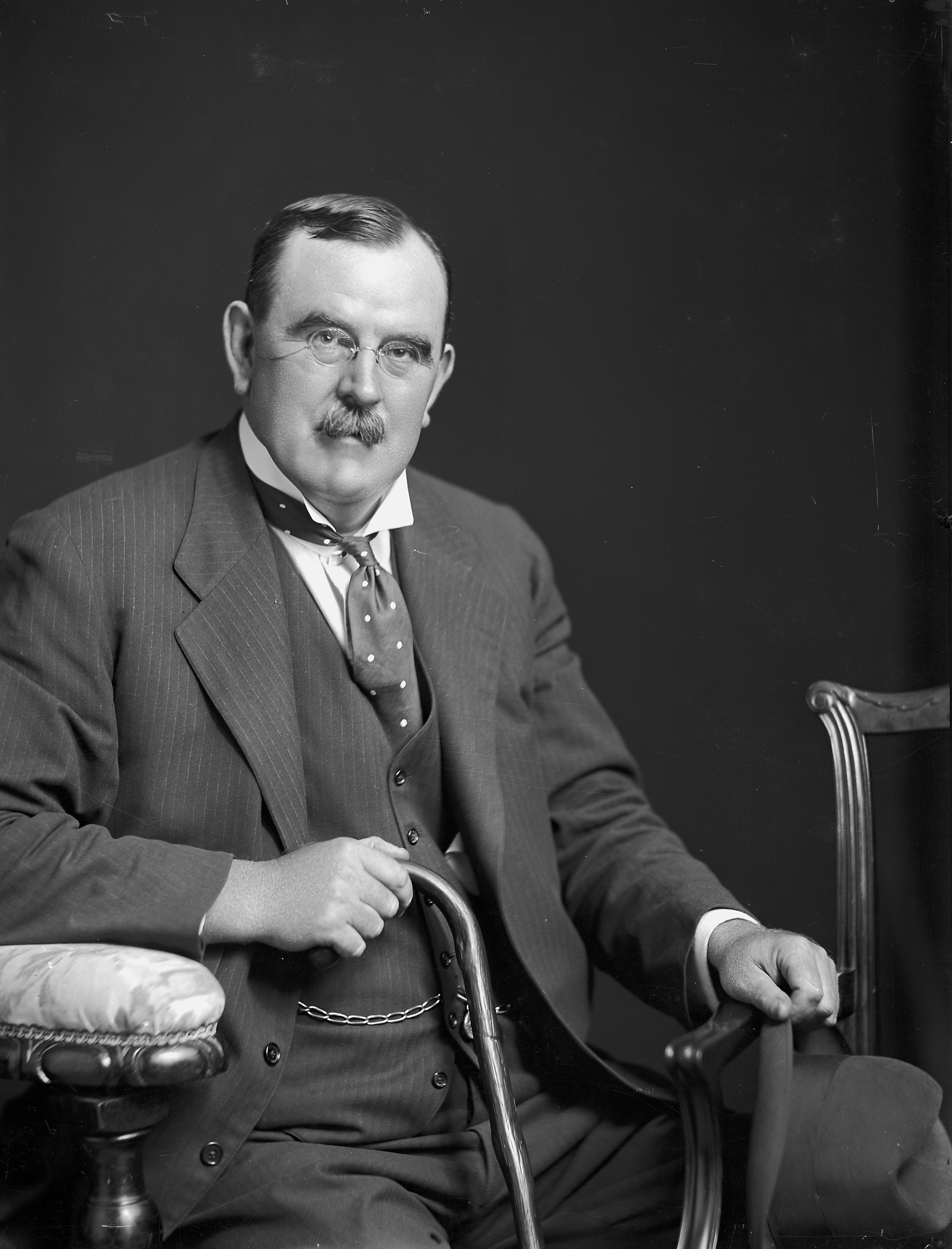
Henry Thacker

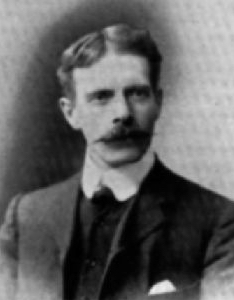
William Begg

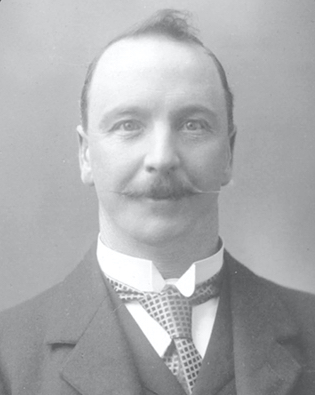
James Douglas

== Events ==
- 31 January – The first scheduled air mail service in New Zealand commences, linking Christchurch with Ashburton and Timaru.
- 17 November – The first radio broadcast in New Zealand is made by Professor Robert Jack from the physics department of the University of Otago.

== Arts and literature ==
See 1921 in art, 1921 in literature, Category:1921 books

=== Music ===
See: 1921 in music

=== Radio ===
- 17 November – Professor Robert Jack assembles a small transmitter at the University of Otago in Dunedin and broadcasts the first ever radio programme heard on New Zealand airwaves. The only known fact about the programme's content is that it included the then popular song "Hello My Dearie".

See: Public broadcasting in New Zealand

=== Film ===
- Beyond
- The Betrayer

See: Category:1921 film awards, 1921 in film, List of New Zealand feature films, Cinema of New Zealand, Category:1921 films

== Sport ==
=== Chess ===
- National champion – John Boyd Dunlop, of Dunedin (his first title)

=== Cricket ===
- Plunket Shield

=== Football ===
- Provincial league champions:
  - Auckland – Northcote
  - Canterbury – Corinthians
  - Hawke's Bay – Waipukurau
  - Nelson – Athletic
  - Otago – HSOB
  - Southland – Corinthians
  - Wanganui – Eastown Workshops
  - Wellington – Hospital

=== Golf ===
- The 11th New Zealand Open championship is won by Ted Douglas (his fourth title)
- The 25th National Amateur Championships are held in Christchurch:
  - Men – A.G. Sime (Greymouth)
  - Women – G. Williams (her fourth title)

=== Horse racing ===
==== Harness racing ====
- New Zealand Trotting Cup – Reta Peter (2nd win)
- Auckland Trotting Cup – Man O' War (2nd win)

==== Thoroughbred racing ====
- New Zealand Cup – Royal Star
- Auckland Cup – Malaga
- Wellington Cup – Maioha
- New Zealand Derby – Winning Hit

=== Lawn bowls ===
The national outdoor lawn bowls championships are held in Wellington.

- Men's singles champion – J.M. Brackenridge (Newtown Bowling Club)
- Men's pair champions – W.A. Grenfell, S. Potter (skip) (Wellington Bowling Club)
- Men's fours champions – B. Hilton, A. Bell, O. Gallagher, Ernie Jury (skip) (Karangahake Bowling Club)

=== Rugby union ===
- 1921 South Africa rugby union tour of Australia and New Zealand
- Southland defend the Ranfurly Shield once against Otago (10–8) before losing it to Wellington (13–28). Wellington then defend it against Auckland (27–19) and Otago (13–8).

=== Shooting ===
- Ballinger Belt – Earl Vennell (Te Wharau)

== Births ==
=== January ===
- 9 January – Fraser Barron, World War II bomber pilot
- 17 January – Jack Bergin, neurologist, anti-abortion campaigner
- 30 January – Joan Faulkner-Blake, broadcaster

=== February ===
- 5 February – Juan Schwanner, association football player and coach
- 6 February – Bob Scott, rugby league and rugby union player
- 7 February – Guy Natusch, architect
- 13 February – Howard Hutchinson, association footballer
- 14 February – Harry Whale, physicist
- 20 February – Tom McGuigan, politician
- 25 February – Keith Thiele, World War II and commercial pilot

=== March ===
- 4 March – Charlie Dempsey, association football administrator
- 12 March – Les Harmer, cricket umpire
- 13 March – Raymond Hesselyn, World War II fighter pilot
- 16 March – Chip Bailey, trade unionist

=== April ===
- 6 April – Jack Hunt, speedway rider
- 10 April – Robert Wade, chess player
- 12 April – Peter Brown, artist
- 27 April – Helen Wily, mathematician
- 30 April – Wally Williams, water polo player

=== May ===
- 2 May – Ron Smith, public servant, peace activist
- 6 May – Tangaroa Tangaroa, Cook Islands politician
- 12 May – Peter Munz, philosopher, historian
- 15 May – Anne Delamere, public servant
- 18 May – Rosalie Carey, playwright, director, poet, actor, author
- 23 May – Richard Harrison, politician
- 26 May
  - Frank Mooney, cricketer
  - Agnes Wood, artist, writer
- 29 May – Wally Argus, rugby union player
- 31 May – Aston Greathead, artist

=== June ===
- 6 June – Shirley Tonkin, sudden infant death syndrome researcher
- 7 June – Brian Talboys, politician
- 13 June – Roy Blair, cricketer
- 17 June – Monita Delamere, rugby union player, Ringatū leader, community leader
- 19 June – Judy Pickard, abstract painter, librarian and advocate for women's rights
- 23 June
  - Cecil Holmes, film director and writer
  - Leonard Willmott, soldier, security intelligence officer
- 25 June – Willow Macky, songwriter
- 28 June – Eric Holland, politician

=== July ===
- 8 July – John Money, psychologist, sexologist, author
- 11 July – Pat Perrin, potter
- 12 July – Doug Dye, microbiologist
- 13 July – Lester Castle, lawyer, public servant
- 18 July – Ian Payne, cricketer
- 21 July – Graham Speight, jurist
- 23 July – Peter Gordon, politician
- 26 July – June Westbury, politician
- 30 July – Eric Grinstead, sinologist, Tangutologist

=== August ===
- 4 August – Patricia Hook, religious sister, nurse and hospital administrator
- 5 August – Colin McLeod, civil engineer
- 6 August – Jack Monaghan, wrestler
- 7 August – Miraka Szászy, Māori leader
- 14 August
  - Donald Burns, cricket umpire
  - Ken Ruby, wrestler
- 21 August – Doreen Lumley, athlete
- 26 August – Bob Owens, businessman, politician, mayor of Tauranga (1968–77)

=== September ===
- 2 September – Diana Isaac, conservationist, businesswoman, philanthropist
- 3 September – Oonah Shannahan, netball player
- 4 September – Bruce Biggs, Māori studies academic
- 14 September – Colin Johnstone, rower
- 19 September – Michael Noonan, novelist, radio and television scriptwriter
- 25 September – Robert Muldoon, politician
- 28 September
  - Morrie Goddard, rugby union player
  - Bruce Mason, playwright
- 29 September – John Ritchie, composer, orchestral founder and conductor, music academic
- 30 September – Jim Macdonald, naval officer, civil engineer, inventor

=== October ===
- 3 October – Eldred Stebbing, record label founder and owner
- 7 October – Desmond O'Donnell, rugby union player
- 9 October – Tom Marshall, Christian writer
- 10 October – Harvey Sweetman, World War II pilot
- 13 October – Earle Riddiford, lawyer and mountaineer
- 18 October – Kingi Ihaka, Anglican priest, broadcaster, Māori leader
- 23 October – Colin Allan, colonial administrator, diplomat
- 29 October – Jack Warcup, mycologist

=== November ===
- 4 November – William Tyree, electrical engineer, businessman, philanthropist
- 6 November – Geoff Rabone, cricketer
- 8 November – Gordon Mason, local-body politician
- 11 November – Buddy Corlett, softball and basketball player
- 17 November – Bruce Irwin, botanist
- 20 November
  - Arthur Faulkner, politician
  - Dick Matthews, plant virologist

=== December ===
- 3 December – Cyril Belshaw, anthropologist
- 8 December
  - Dot McNab, military administrator, political organizer
  - Bob Walton, police officer
- 11 December – David Baldwin, lawn bowls player
- 24 December – Vincent Bevan, rugby union player
- 29 December – Ngoi Pēwhairangi, songwriter, Māori language teacher and advocate

== Deaths ==
=== January–March ===
- 19 January – Frank Lawry, politician (born 1839)
- 7 February – Bella Button, horse driver and trainer, equestrian (born 1863)
- 23 February – J. T. Marryat Hornsby, politician, newspaper editor and proprietor (born 1857)
- 27 February – Sir James Prendergast, lawyer, politician, jurist (born 1826)
- 9 March – Walter Powdrell, politician (born 1872)
- 10 March – Henry Brown, saw miller, politician (born 1842)
- 21 March – Samuel Moreton, artist, explorer (born c.1844)

=== April–June ===
- 4 April – Mary Jane Milne, milliner, businesswoman (born 1840)
- 19 April – Cathcart Wason, politician (born 1848)
- 23 April – William Maxwell, politician (born 1867)
- 1 June – Tureiti Te Heuheu, Ngāti Tūwharetoa leader, politician (born c.1865)
- 24 June – William Dickie, politician (born 1869)
- 25 June – Haimona Patete, Ngāti Koata and Ngāti Kuia leader, religious founder (born c.1863)

=== July–September ===
- 19 July – Lily Atkinson, temperance campaigner, suffragist, feminist (born 1866)
- 31 July – Alice Jacob, botanical illustrator, lace designer, design teacher (born 1862)
- 13 August – Ōtene Pītau, Rongowhakaata leader (born c.1834)
- 5 August – Robert Kirkpatrick Simpson, politician (born 1837)
- 17 August – John Aitken, politician, mayor of Wellington (1900–05) (born 1849)
- 9 September – Joseph Henry Cock, shipping company manager, patron of the arts (born 1855)
- 17 September – John Verrall, photographer, politician (born 1849)
- 20 September – Thomas Kelly, politician (born 1830)

=== October–December ===
- 29 October – Samuel Nevill, Anglican bishop (born 1837)
- 31 October – James Little, shepherd, sheep breeder (born 1834)
- 1 November
  - Jeremiah Twomey, journalist, politician (born 1847)
- 29 November – Hopere Uru, rugby union player, cricketer, politician (born 1868)
- 2 December – Patrick Nerheny, politician (born 1858)

== See also ==
- List of years in New Zealand
- History of New Zealand
- Military history of New Zealand
- Timeline of New Zealand history
- Timeline of New Zealand's links with Antarctica
- Timeline of the New Zealand environment
