= 1993 in New Zealand =

- Decades: 1970s; 1980s; 1990s; 2000s; 2010s
- See also: History of New Zealand; List of years in New Zealand; Timeline of New Zealand history

The following lists events that happened during 1993 in New Zealand.

== Population ==
- Estimated Population as of 31 December: 3,597,800.
- Increase since 31 December 1992: 45,600 (1.28%).
- Males per 100 Females: 97.1.

== Incumbents ==
=== Regal and viceregal ===
- Head of State – Elizabeth II
- Governor-General – The Hon Dame Catherine Tizard, GCMG, GCVO, DBE, QSO

=== Government ===
The 43rd New Zealand Parliament continued. Government was The National Party, led by Jim Bolger. National controlled nearly seventy percent of the seats in Parliament. In the 1993 New Zealand general election National was returned to power with a reduced majority.

- Speaker of the House – Robin Gray then Peter Tapsell
- Prime Minister – Jim Bolger
- Deputy Prime Minister – Don McKinnon
- Minister of Finance – Ruth Richardson then Bill Birch
- Minister of Foreign Affairs – Don McKinnon
- Chief Justice — Sir Thomas Eichelbaum

=== Parliamentary opposition ===
- Leader of the Opposition – Mike Moore (Labour) until 1 December, then Helen Clark (Labour).
- NewLabour Party – Jim Anderton until
- Alliance – Jim Anderton. (after 6 November general election)
- New Zealand First: Winston Peters (after the general election)

=== Main centre leaders ===
- Mayor of Auckland – Les Mills
- Mayor of Hamilton – Margaret Evans
- Mayor of Wellington – Fran Wilde
- Mayor of Christchurch – Vicki Buck
- Mayor of Dunedin – Richard Walls

== Events ==
- 17 April – By-election in Tauranga after the National MP Winston Peters resigned from both his party and from Parliament. He recontested the seat as an independent and won it after no major political party stood a candidate.
- 26 May – Disappearance from Karangahape Road in Auckland of 17-year-old Jayne Furlong.
- 10 August - A magnitude 6.8 earthquake strikes Secretary Island, Fiordland.
- 25 August – A concrete mixer truck fails to stop at a railway level crossing in Rolleston and hits the side of a southbound Southerner passenger train, killing three people on board and seriously injuring seven others.
- 6 November
  - The 1993 general election is held, with the National losing its large majority to retain power by one seat.
  - The 1993 voting method referendum is held, with a 53.9% majority voting to change to the Mixed Member Proportional (MMP) voting system.
- 26 November – Auckland mid-air collision of police Eagle helicopter and traffic spotting Piper Archer over the Auckland CBD, killing all occupants of both aircraft – two police and two civilians; debris falls on the motorway.
- The Tonga Island Marine Reserve is established.

== Arts and literature ==
- Stuart Hoare wins the Robert Burns Fellowship.

See 1993 in art, 1993 in literature, Category:1993 books

=== Music ===
==== New Zealand Music Awards ====
Winners are shown first with nominees underneath.

- Album of the Year: The Mutton Birds – The Mutton Birds
  - Jan Hellriegel – It's My Sin
  - Shona Laing – New on Earth
- Single of the Year: The Mutton Birds – Nature
  - Annie Crummer – See What Love Can Do
  - Greg Johnson Set – Isabelle
- Best Male Vocalist: Greg Johnson
  - Jordan Luck
  - Paul Ubana Jones
- Best Female Vocalist: Annie Crummer
  - Patsy Riggir
  - Shona Laing
- Best Group: The Mutton Birds
  - Greg Johnson Set
  - The Exponents
- Most Promising Male Vocalist: Ted Brown
  - Jay Rei
  - Kevin Greaves
- Most Promising Female Vocalist: Jan Hellriegel
  - Jules Issa
  - Maree Sheehan
- Most Promising Group: Head Like a Hole
  - Dead Flowers
  - Kantuta
- Best Producer: Nigel Stone / Annie Crummer – See What Love Can Do
  - Angus McNaughton – Donde Esta La Pollo
  - Nick Morgan – It's My Sin
- Best Engineer: Nigel Stone – See What Love Can Do (Annie Crummer)
  - Graeme Myhre – New on Earth
  - Nick Morgan/ Graeme Myhre/ John Harvey – It's My Sin
- Best Video: Kerry Brown / Bruce Sheridan – Four Seasons in One Day (Crowded House)
  - Fane Flaws & The Mutton Birds/ Sycorax Films – Nature (The Mutton Birds)
  - Nigel Streeter – Fish Across Face (Head Like A Hole)
- Best International Performer: Jenny Morris
  - Dame Malvina Major
  - Shona Laing
- Best Songwriter: Jan Hellriegel – It's My Sin
  - David Kilgour – You Forget
  - Jordan Luck – Something Beginning With C
- Best Māori Album: Southside of Bombay – All Across The World
  - Hinewehi Mohe – Kia U
  - Te Hei O Tahoka – Ahorangi Genesis
- Best Cover: Shaun Pettigrew – Kantuta
  - David Mitchell – Hellzapoppin
  - Jan Hellriegel – It's My Sin
- Best Country Album: Barry Saunders – Long Shadows
  - Brendan Dugan – All This Time
  - Patsy Riggir – Moonlight & Roses
- Best Gospel Album: Wanganui Collegiate & South Wairarapa Singers – Faure Requiem
  - Steve Apirana – No Turning Back
  - St Paul's Collegiate – School Music
- Best Classical Album: Dame Malvina Major – Dame Malvina in Concert
  - Dame Malvina Major – I Remember
  - NZ National Youth Choir – NZ National Youth Choir
- Best Folk Album: Claddagh – Continental Drift
  - Paul Ubana Jones – The Things Which Touch Me So
  - Rua – Live in the Cathedral
- Best Jazz Album: Broadhurst / Hopkins / Haines – Live at the London Bar
  - The Inner City Jazz Workshop – Live in Concert
  - Malcolm McNeill – Skylark
- Best Polynesian Album: Annie Crummer – Language
  - Harbour Light Express – Ua Ou Misia Oe
  - Mere Darling – Rarotonga Waits For Me
  - Samoan AOG – Foi Maia I Le Alii

See: 1993 in music

=== Performing arts ===
- Benny Award presented by the Variety Artists Club of New Zealand to Mary Throll and Rob Guest OBE.

=== Radio and television ===
See: 1993 in New Zealand television, 1993 in television, List of TVNZ television programming, Category:Television in New Zealand, TV3 (New Zealand), Category:New Zealand television shows, Public broadcasting in New Zealand

=== Film ===
- Desperate Remedies
- Map of the Human Heart
- The Piano

See: Category:1993 film awards, 1993 in film, List of New Zealand feature films, Cinema of New Zealand, Category:1993 films

=== Internet ===
See: NZ Internet History

== Sport ==
=== Athletics ===
- Paul Herlihy wins his second national title in the men's marathon, clocking 2:15:50 in Invercargill, while Gabrielle O'Rourke claims her first in the women's championship (2:38:23).

=== Horse racing ===
==== Harness racing ====
- New Zealand Trotting Cup: Chokin
- Auckland Trotting Cup: Chokin

=== Rugby league ===
- Canterbury retained the Rugby League Cup throughout the season.
- Canterbury defeated Auckland 36–12 in the National Provincial Competition final.
- 20 June, New Zealand drew with Australia 14-all
- 25 June, New Zealand lost to Australia 8–16
- 30 June, New Zealand lost to Australia 4–16
- 4 October, New Zealand defeated Wales 24-19
- 16 October, New Zealand lost to Great Britain 0–17
- 30 October, New Zealand lost to Great Britain 12–29
- 6 November, New Zealand lost to Great Britain 10–29
- 21 November, New Zealand defeated France 36-11

=== Shooting ===
- Ballinger Belt – Ross Collings (Karori)

=== Soccer ===
- The Chatham Cup is won by Napier City Rovers who beat Christchurch Rangers 6–0 in the final.

== Births ==
=== January ===
- 1 January – Randa, rapper
- 8 January – Sophie Pascoe, Paralympic swimmer
- 10 January – David Bhana, rugby league player
- 13 January – Storm Roux, association footballer
- 15 January – Justin Gulley, association footballer
- 16 January – Mary Fisher, Paralympic swimmer
- 17 January – Lolagi Visinia, rugby union player
- 20 January – Tom Biss, association footballer
- 23 January – Patrick Tuipulotu, rugby union player
- 24 January – Albert Vete, rugby league player

=== February ===
- 9 February – Daniel Lienert-Brown, rugby union player
- 10 February – Melody Tan, singer
- 11 February – Chris Vui, rugby union player
- 15 February – Stephanie McKenzie, racing cyclist
- 18 February – Siliva Havili, rugby league player
- 23 February – Mitch Renwick, cricketer
- 25 February
  - Edwin Maka, rugby union player
  - Nesiasi Mataitonga, rugby league player
- 28 February – Matthew Quinn, cricketer

=== March ===
- 1 March – Cam Fletcher, cricketer
- 2 March – Pieter Bulling, racing cyclist
- 3 March – Dion Smith, road cyclist
- 12 March – Ruby Livingstone, racing cyclist
- 14 March
  - Michael Little, rugby union player
  - Katherine Westbury, tennis player
- 20 March – Cameron Clark, rugby union player
- 25 March – Jordan Payne, rugby union player
- 30 March – Mitch Clark, rugby league player
- 31 March – Molly Meech, sailor

=== April ===
- 2 April – Matthew Small, water polo player
- 3 April – Louis Fenton, association football player
- 7 April – Jacob Skeen, rugby union player
- 13 April
  - Matthew Bacon, cricketer
  - Reid McGowan, gymnast
- 14 April – Sione Mafileo, rugby union player
- 17 April – Portia Bing, heptathlete
- 18 April – Siliva Havili, rugby league player
- 3 April – Louis Fenton, footballer
- 5 April – Hikule'o Malu, rugby league player
- 14 April – Rhiannon Dennison, field hockey player
- 17 April – Hamish Watson, association footballer
- 18 April – Scott Scrafton, rugby union player
- 20 April – Storm Purvis, netball player
- 22 April – Ngani Laumape, rugby league player
- 29 April
  - Jamie Gibson, cricketer
  - Stephen Jones, rower

=== May ===
- 5 May – Briana Mitchell, artistic gymnast
- 8 May – Jordan Manihera, rugby union player
- 15 May – Jeremy Hawkins, rugby league player
- 16 May – Michael Sio, rugby league player
- 25 May – Teihorangi Walden, rugby union player
- 31 May – Jason Taumalolo, rugby league player

=== June ===
- 3 June – Michael Collins, rugby union player
- 5 June – Roger Tuivasa-Sheck, rugby league player
- 6 June
  - Jack Debreczeni, rugby union player
  - Rosie White, association footballer
- 8 June – Lausii Taliauli, rugby union player
- 10 June – Scott McLaughlin, motor racing driver
- 16 June – Samuel Blakely, cricketer
- 17 June
  - James Oram, cyclist
  - Rebekah Stott, association footballer
- 18 June
  - Alex Frame, racing cyclist
  - Jamie-Jerry Taulagi, rugby union player
  - Jade Te Rure, rugby union player
- 20 June – Abraham Papalii, rugby league player
- 29 June – Caleb Shepherd, rowing coxswain

=== July ===
- 2 July – Tayla Ford, amateur wrestler
- 14 July – Julia Ratcliffe, hammer thrower
- 15 July – Edward Nuttall, cricketer
- 16 July – Alex Hodgman, rugby union player
- 20 July – Steven Adams, basketball player
- 26 July
  - Raymond Faitala-Mariner, rugby league player
  - Sarah Landry, water polo player
  - Theo van Woerkom, cricketer

=== August ===
- 6 August – Alexandra Rout, figure skater
- 12 August – Max Crocombe, association footballer
- 15 August – Mitchell Brown, rugby union player
- 20 August – Anjali Mulari, ice hockey and inline hockey player
- 23 August – Jaime Ridge, socialite
- 25 August – Georgia Williams, racing cyclist
- 27 August – Joe Webber, rugby union player
- 31 August – Great Command, thoroughbred racehorse

=== September ===
- 5 September – Sione Molia, rugby union player
- 21 September
  - Joe Edwards, rugby union player
  - Jason Emery, rugby union player
- 27 September
  - Massad Barakat-Devine, musician
  - Liam Higgins, association footballer

=== October ===
- 2 October – Daniel Franks, BMX rider
- 5 October – Olivia Chance, association footballer
- 6 October – Might and Power, thoroughbred racehorse
- 13 October – Blair Tickner, cricketer
- 14 October – Ardie Savea, rugby union player
- 27 October – Denny Solomona, rugby league player

=== November ===
- 6 November – Carina Doyle, swimmer
- 12 November – Kurtis Rowe, rugby league player
- 14 November
  - Jackson Hemopo, rugby union player
  - Hymel Hunt, rugby league player
- 15 November – Allan Fa'alava'au, rugby union player
- 16 November – Devy Dyson, gymnast
- 17 November – Chris Feauai-Sautia, rugby union player
- 20 November
  - Scott Barrett, rugby union player
  - Junior Paulo, rugby league player
- 24 November – Tayler Adams, rugby union player
- 26 November – Georgia Guy, cricketer
- 27 November – Toa Halafihi, rugby union player
- 30 November – Lyell Creek, standardbred racehorse

=== December ===
- 18 December – Kerri Gowler, rower
- 26 December – Taleni Seu, rugby union player

=== Full date unknown ===
- Jessica Clarke, fashion model
- Daniel McBride, musician
- Thomas Sewell, Neo-Nazi

== Deaths ==
=== January–March ===
- 1 January – Sir Kingi Ihaka, Anglican priest, broadcaster, Māori leader (born 1921)
- 6 January – Cole Wilson, musician (born 1922)
- 7 January – John Crichton, furniture and interior designer (born 1917)
- 10 January – Bill Gray, rugby union player (born 1932)
- 13 January – Bob Smith, rower (born 1909)
- 14 January – Venn Young, politician (born 1929)
- 27 January
  - Alan Geddes, athlete (born 1912)
  - Mary Rouse, cricketer (born 1926)
- 30 January – James LuValle, athlete, scientist (born 1912)
- 5 February – Tommy Adderley, singer (born 1940)
- 10 February
  - Fred Hollows, ophthalmologist (born 1929)
  - Nancy Russell, speech teacher (born 1909)
- 17 February – Leslie Townsend, cricketer (born 1903)
- 27 February – John Hippolite, activist (born 1929)
- 5 March – Sir Colin Allan, colonial official, diplomat, author (born 1921)
- 8 March – Tui Mayo, nurse, politician (born 1905)
- 11 March – Tibor Donner, architect (born 1907)
- 12 March
  - Lewis Johnston, cricket umpire (born 1917)
  - Robin Morrison, photographer (born 1944)
- 26 March – Edwin Norton, weightlifter (born 1926)
- 28 March – Jelal Natali, community leader, anti-racism activist (born 1899)
- 31 March – Wharetutu Stirling, Ngāi Tahu leader, conservationist (born 1924)

=== April–June ===
- 2 April – Ted Chamberlain, plant pathologist (born 1906)
- 4 April – Sir Charles Elworthy, Baron Elworthy, air force officer (born 1911)
- 15 April – Herbert Dudley Purves, medical researcher (born 1908)
- 17 April – Doris Palmer, political activist, welfare worker (born 1898)
- 21 April – Lincoln Hurring, swimmer (born 1931)
- 28 April – Sir Monita Delamere, rugby union player, Māori leader (born 1921)
- 29 April – Cyril Kay, aviator, military leader (born 1902)
- 22 May – Colleen Dewe, politician (born 1930)
- 24 May – Eric Lee-Johnson, artist and photographer (born 1908)
- 30 May – Frank Robson, marine conservationist (born 1912)
- 3 June – Lester Harvey, rugby union player (born 1919)
- 7 June – Rita Smith, communist, political activist (born 1912)
- 10 June – Nellie Schroder, community leader (born 1903)
- 20 June – Sir Keith Sinclair, historian (born 1922)

=== July–September ===
- 7 July – Sir Alexander Turner, lawyer and jurist (born 1901)
- 20 July – Harata Solomon, community leader (born 1925)
- 26 July – Phyllis Williams, singer (born 1905)
- 28 July – Vincent McCarten, cricketer (born 1913)
- 3 August – Sir Laurie Francis, diplomat, lawyer (born 1918)
- 4 August – Sir Harcourt Caughey, rugby union player, businessman (born 1911)
- 7 August – Paul Little, rugby union player (born 1934)
- 9 August – Jack Parker, boxer (born 1915)
- 10 August – Mike Bungay, lawyer (born 1934)
- 24 August – James Bertram, journalist, writer, university academic (born 1910)
- 25 August – Florence James, author and literary agent (born 1902)
- 7 September – Guy Overton, cricketer (born 1919)
- 17 September – John Robson, public servant, penal reformer (born 1909)
- 18 September – Rodger Freeth, motorsport competitor (born 1953)
- 24 September – Monte Holcroft, essayist and novelist (born 1902)

=== October–December ===
- 1 October
  - Mabel Corby, cricketer (born 1913)
  - Tom Marshall, Christian writer (born 1921)
- 4 October – Fred Lucas, military and commercial pilot, farmer, tourist operator (born 1915)
- 8 October – Gu Cheng, writer (born 1956)
- 17 October – Gordon Grieve, politician (born 1912)
- 19 October – Ring the Bell, thoroughbred racehorse (foaled 1977)
- 1 November – Sir Arthur Ward, dairy researcher, university administrator (born 1906)
- 3 November – Redmond Phillips, actor, writer (born 1912)
- 6 November – Zena Abbott, weaver (born 1922)
- 19 November – Sir John Stallworthy, obstetrician (born 1906)
- 20 November – Eve van Grafhorst, HIV/AIDS sufferer and community figure (born 1982)
- 11 December – Bill Mumm, rugby union player, politician (born 1922)
- 12 December – Ned Barry, rugby union player (born 1905)
- 24 December – Dorrie Parker, athlete (born 1928)
- 28 December – John Kemp, association footballer (born 1940)

== See also ==
- List of years in New Zealand
- Timeline of New Zealand history
- History of New Zealand
- Military history of New Zealand
- Timeline of the New Zealand environment
- Timeline of New Zealand's links with Antarctica
