= James Lytle =

James Lytle may refer to:

- James Lytle (coach) (1901–1987), American football, basketball, baseball, and golf coach and college athletics administrator
- James Lytle (rugby union) (1875—1928), Irish international rugby union player

== See also ==
- James Little (disambiguation)
