= Tuisamoa =

Tuisamoa or TuiSamoa is a surname. Notable people with the surname include:

- Agnes TuiSamoa (1932–2004), New Zealand activist
- Matthew Tuisamoa (fl. 1991–2001), Samoan rugby league player
- Tai Tuisamoa (born 1980), American rugby union player
