= Ida Lough =

New Zealand weaver

Ida Mary Lough (1 May 1903 – 13 August 1985) was a New Zealand weaver, recognised as one of the country's best tapestry makers.

== Life ==
Ida Mary Withers was born in Wellington, the daughter of Elizabeth Robins and her husband John Talbot Withers, a decorator. She grew up in Duvachelle, Banks Peninsula and attended Christchurch Girls’ High School.

Lough’s early aspiration was to be a writer; one of her poems was included in the 1930 anthology of New Zealand poetry Kowhai Gold. In the early 1930s Lough spent three years in France working as a governess in order to learn French. She returned to Christchurch in the mid 1930s, where she spent the remainder of her life.

On 30 August 1947 Lough married John Harold Welsh Lough, who died later that year in the Ballantyne’s department store fire.

== Weaving career ==
Lough did not take up weaving until she was in her forties, when a visit to Scandinavia in 1953 triggered her interest in learning weaving. On her return to Christchurch she set about finding tuition and materials: at this time there was little access to supplies or tuition. Lough was working as a librarian at Burwood Hospital and Judith Hay, the occupational therapist at the hospital, taught her the basics of weaving.

Using coloured cotton and linen thread, Lough built up her skills largely on hundreds of sets of table-mats, which sold well. She also learned to spin and dye her own wool. In 1959 her work was shown at the Auckland City Art Gallery in an exhibition of New Zealand craft, along with other weavers such as Ilse van Randow and Zena Abbott. The introduction to the catalogue noted a ‘healthy trend shown by this exhibition, particularly in the pottery and weaving sections, is an experimentation with local materials’. Brief biographies of the exhibiting artists were included in the catalogue:

Ida Lough. Weaver. Specially interested in weaving home-spun New Zealand wool and in plant dyeing. Doing plant-dye research in collaboration with Dr Elsa Kidson of Cawthorne Institute, Nelson.

Lough’s work was also shown at New Vision Gallery, the Dowse Art Museum and the New Zealand Academy of Fine Arts, and included in the 1965 Commonwealth Festival in London and Expo ‘70 in Osaka. She was the only weaver to be a member of The Group, a Christchurch-based group of prominent artists that organised annual exhibitions for 25 years, showing with them for ten years.

In the late 1970s and early 1970s Lough moved away from domestic pieces and focused on tapestries, which were more time-consuming. She took inspiration from her Christchurch surrounding, such as the series of 30 tapestries inspired by Hagley Park. The design of Water Grasses, an abstract tapestry held in the collection of the Christchurch Art Gallery, was inspired by the rushes and grasses in Hagley Park and Christchurch’s Botanical Gardens.

In 1975 Lough was commissioned to weave a large tapestry for the interior of Christchurch’s Cathedral of the Blessed Sacrament. The tapestry was completed in close collaboration sculptor Ria Bancroft. Titled Earth with Heaven United, the work measures 274 by 244 centimetres and took a year to complete.

In a 1985 profile capturing the history of Lough’s practice, produced in collaboration with Lough, Holly Blair wrote

Ida never makes cartoons, but designs straight onto the loom. Nor does she make preliminary sketches, because she says she is no artist, and anyway ‘no crayons or chalks could ever match the subtlety and warmth of wool’.

== Contributions to the craft sector ==
In the early 1960s Lough helped set up a weaving room at the Canterbury Sheltered Workshop for intellectually disabled people, and taught there for eleven years. She was a founding member of the New Zealand chapter of the World Crafts Council and Patron of the Christchurch Guild of Spinners and Weavers.

== Further resources ==
The Museum of New Zealand Te Papa Tongarewa holds a series of photographs of Lough and her work taken by John Daley in around 1977.
