= James Little =

James Little may refer to:

- James Little (American politician), Wisconsin State Assemblyman
- James Little (British politician) (1868–1946), unionist politician in Northern Ireland
- James Little (physician) (1837–1916), Irish physician
- James-Little Ecological Reserve
- Jimmy Little (1937–2012), Australian Aboriginal musician, singer and songwriter
- Jim Little (businessman) (born 1964), CEO of Ottawa Senators
- Jimmy Little (carpenter) (born 1976), carpenter, stagehand and TV personality
- James Little (shepherd) (1834–1921), New Zealand shepherd and sheep breeder
- James Little (unionist), American labor union leader
- James Lewis Little (1871–1967), schooner captain and politician in Newfoundland
- James Little (painter) (born 1952), American painter

== See also ==
- Allan Little (born 1959), former BBC researcher and reporter
