= 1985 Birthday Honours (New Zealand) =

Awards list for New Zealand

The 1985 Queen's Birthday Honours in New Zealand, celebrating the official birthday of Elizabeth II, were appointments made by the Queen in her right as Queen of New Zealand, on the advice of the New Zealand government, to various orders and honours to reward and highlight good works by New Zealanders. They were announced on 15 June 1985.

The recipients of honours are displayed here as they were styled before their new honour.

== Knight Bachelor ==
- The Most Reverend Paul Alfred Reeves – of Auckland; Anglican Primate and Archbishop of New Zealand.
- The Honourable Clinton Marcus Roper – of Christchurch; lately a judge of the High Court.
- Professor Keith Sinclair CBE – of Auckland. For services to historical research and literature.
- Ronald Ramsay Trotter – of Wellington. For services to business management.
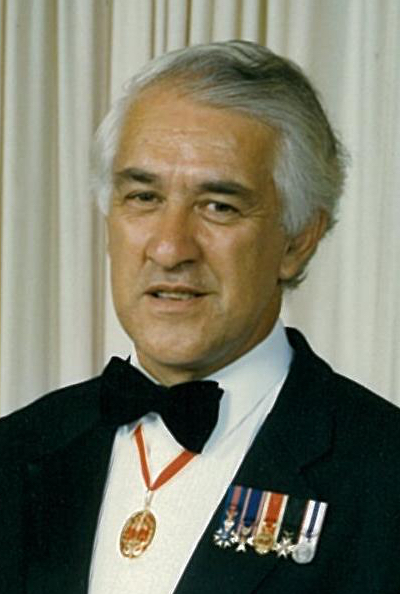
Sir Paul Reeves

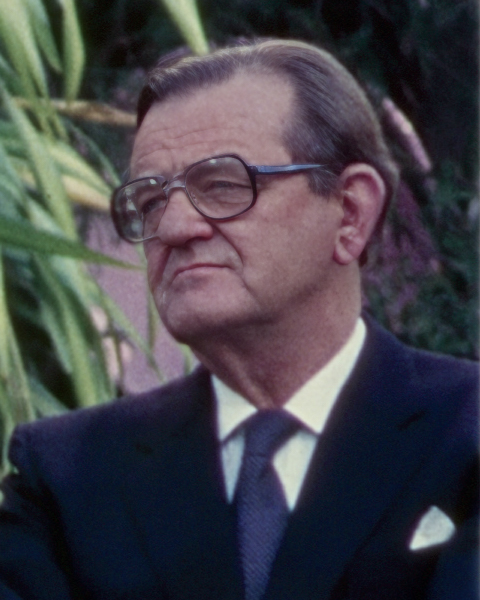
Sir Ron Trotter

== Order of Saint Michael and Saint George ==
=== Knight Commander (KCMG) ===
- George Robert Laking CMG – of Wellington; Chief Ombudsman, 1977–1984.
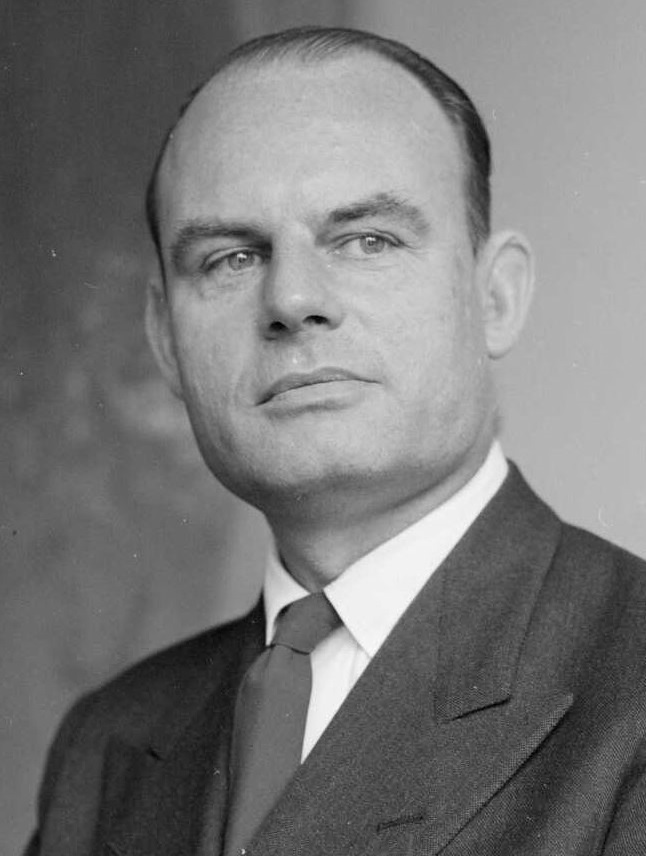
Sir George Laking

=== Companion (CMG) ===
- Jack James Chesterman – of Wellington; Secretary of Energy, Ministry of Energy.
- Lyndsay Mason Papps – of Wellington. For public services.

== Royal Victorian Order ==
=== Commander (CVO) ===
- James Brown – official secretary, Government House, Wellington.

== Order of the British Empire ==
=== Dame Commander (DBE) ===
Civil division

- Jean Marjory Herbison CMG – of Christchurch. For services to education.

=== Commander (CBE) ===
Civil division

- The Most Reverend Brian Patrick Ashby – of Christchurch; Roman Catholic Bishop of Christchurch.
- Peter Michael Butler – of Upper Hutt. For services to the trade-union movement.
- Kinnear George Fraser – of Auckland. For services to industry and the community.
- Donald Conroy McIntyre OBE – of Kent, England. For services to opera.
- Violet Sylvia Pou – of Whangārei. For services to the Māori Women's Welfare League.
- Professor Richard Garwood Robinson GM – of Dunedin. For services to medicine, especially neurosurgery.
- Dr Dean Carey Williams – of Hamilton; lately chairman, New Zealand Medical Association.
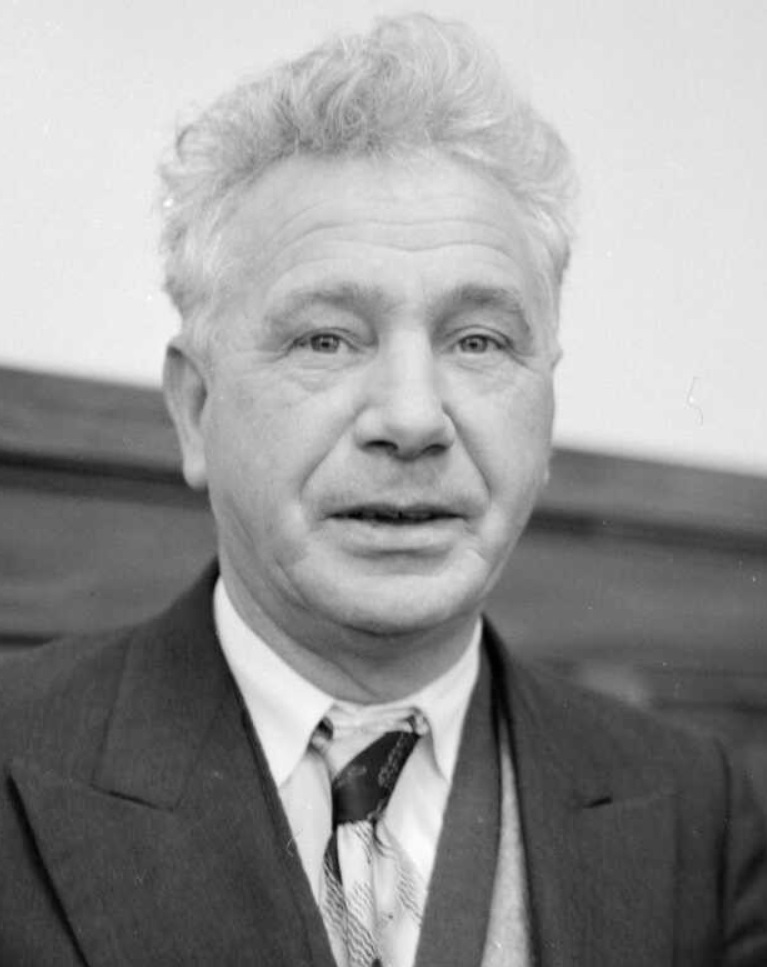
Peter Butler

=== Officer (OBE) ===
Civil division

- Matthew George Brajkovich – of Auckland. For services to the wine industry.
- Emeritus Professor James Towers Campbell – of Nelson. For services to education.
- Roderic George Compton – of Kaiapoi. For services to the Nurse Maude Nursing Association and the community.
- Arthur Maitland Hughes JP – of Auckland. For services to racing administration.
- Professor Reinhart Hugo Michael Langer – of Christchurch. For services to agricultural education.
- Emeritus Professor John Rushforth McCreary – of Wellington. For services to social welfare.
- Dr Donald Michael Fraser McDonald JP – of Auckland. For services to medicine.
- Malvina Lorraine Major (Mrs Fleming) – of Ōpunake. For services to opera.
- Dr Graham Anderson Milne – of Martinborough. For services to asthmatics.
- Lorna Overend – of Christchurch. For services to athletics and the community.
- Margaret Annie (Nancy) Radford – of Wellington. For services to Barnardo's and the community.
- Patariki te Rei – of Rotorua. For services to Māori culture, language and the community.
- George Alfred Smith JP – of Helensville. For services to local-body and community affairs.
- Dr Shirley Lyford Tonkin – of Auckland. For services to medicine and welfare.
- Geoffrey Thomson Upton DSO – of Taupō. For services to journalism and the newspaper industry.
- Hal Hugh Wagstaff – of Wellington. For services to yachting.
- Davina Eileen Eliza Whitehouse – of Pukerua Bay. For services to the performing arts.
- Elaine Jean Whiteman – of Wellington. For services to nursing.
- Jean Boughton Wishart – of Auckland. For services to journalism.

Military division

- Captain John O'Hara Tobin – Royal New Zealand Navy.
- Lieutenant Colonel Peter Valentine Coster ED – Royal New Zealand Infantry Regiment (Territorial Force).
- Group Captain John Stewart Boys AFC – Royal New Zealand Air Force.
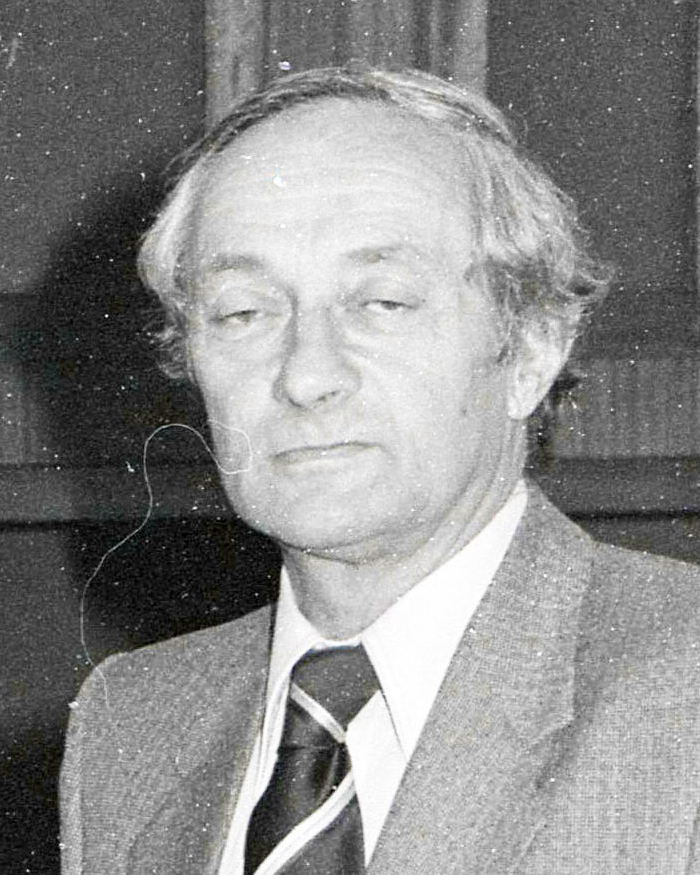
Reinhart Langer

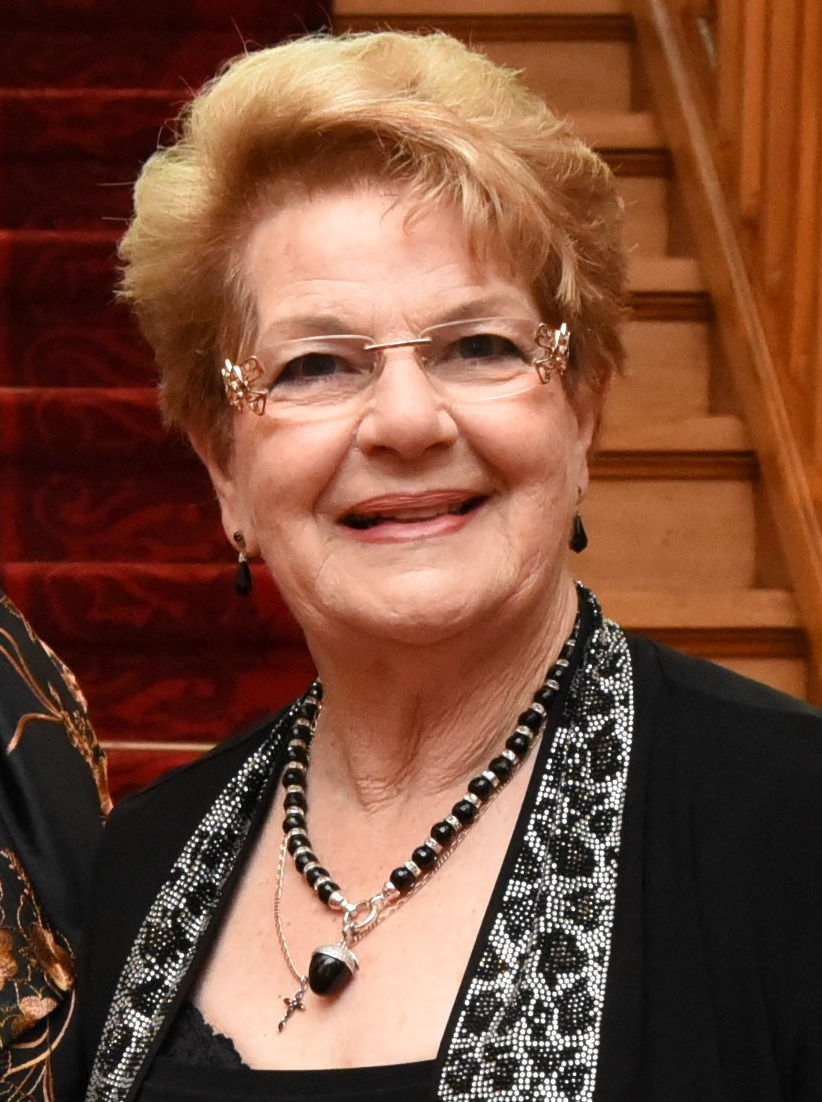
Malvina Major

=== Member (MBE) ===
Civil division

- Lionel Albert JP – of Auckland. For services to the community.
- Alfred Gaynor Beadle – of Wellington. For public services especially to the New Zealand Wheat Board.
- Brian Kenneth Berg. For services to local body and community affairs.
- Richard Trevor Brittenden – of Christchurch. For services to sporting journalism.
- Thomas Leonard Brown – of Papatoetoe. For services to education.
- Frederick Henry Charles – of Upper Hutt. For services to the gas industry and the community.
- Reginald Edmond Combes – of Auckland. For services to pharmacy.
- Patrick John Gaines – superintendent, New Zealand Police.
- Eric Jerkovich – of Papakura. For services to education.
- Professor Emeritus George Alexander Knox – of Christchurch; lately professor of zoology, University of Canterbury.
- Andrew Forrester McLay JP – of Waimate. For services to local-body and community affairs.
- Ian William McMeeking JP – of Dunedin. For services to the community.
- Edward Charles Mansfield JP – of Auckland. For services to the community.
- Andrew Osmond Melville – of Wellington. For services to athletics.
- Jules Donna McKenzie Panui o Marama Mitchell – of Rotorua. For services to the community.
- Ronald Leslie Moore – of Christchurch. For services to speedway sport.
- Walter Thomas Neal JP – of Blackball. For services to local-body and community affairs.
- George Lancelot Osborne JP – of Wellington. For services to the Royal Federation of New Zealand Justices' Association.
- William Joseph Gregory Roach MC JP – of Palmerston North. For services to the community.
- Arthur Stanley Scaife – of Wānaka. For services to local government.
- David Roy Simmons – of Auckland. For services to ethnology and the Māori people.
- Thomas Murray Forbes Taylor – of Kurow. For service to local-body and community affairs.
- Roy James Towers – of Lower Hutt. For services to the St John Ambulance Brigade.
- John Francis Wheeler – of Nelson. For services to the community and the arts.

Military division

- Warrant Officer Writer Robert James Kilpatrick – Royal New Zealand Navy.
- Temporary Lieutenant Commander Glen Ross Millar – Royal New Zealand Navy.
- Lieutenant Commander Graham Francis Nixey – Royal New Zealand Navy.
- Major Richard Rodney Ottaway – Royal New Zealand Corps of Transport.
- Captain (now Major) and Quartermaster David James Mowat – Royal New Zealand Electrical and Mechanical Engineers.
- Master Air Electronics Operator Noel Joseph Crump – Royal New Zealand Air Force.
- Squadron Leader Isabel Joan Mary Dougan – Royal New Zealand Air Force.
- Squadron Leader Gilbert Randal Springer – Royal New Zealand Air Force.
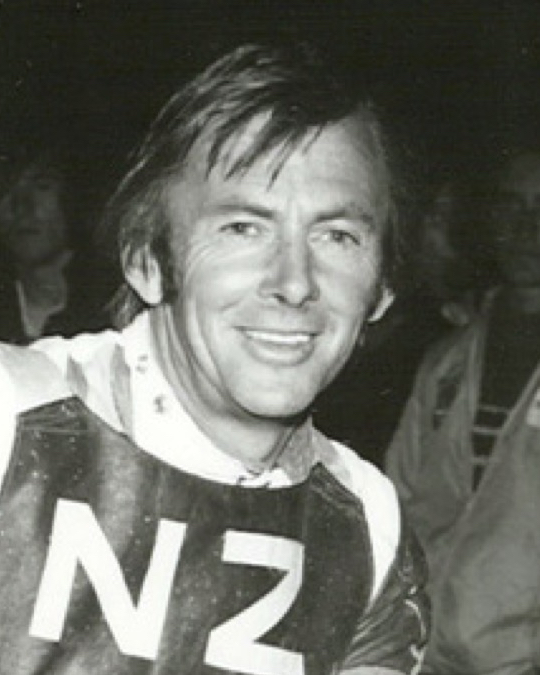
Ronnie Moore

== British Empire Medal (BEM) ==
Military division

- General Service Hand Robert John Prater – Royal New Zealand Navy.
- Staff Sergeant John Brian Hadfield – Corps of Royal New Zealand Engineers (Territorial Force).
- Staff Sergeant (now Temporary Warrant Officer Class II) Murray Lawrence David Ross – Royal New Zealand Corps of Transport.
- Sergeant (now Flight Sergeant) Gavin Frederick Gault – Royal New Zealand Air Force.
- Flight Sergeant Thomas Roger Harrison – Royal New Zealand Air Force.

== Companion of the Queen's Service Order (QSO) ==
=== For community service ===
- Anne Anituatua Delamere – of Wellington.
- Charles Tumate Tonga Mahuta – of Huntly.
- Betty Gertrude Pearson – of Christchurch.
- Frederick George Ryan – of Rotorua.
- The Reverend Father Stuart James Sellar – of Dunedin.

=== For public services ===
- Lancelot Victor Blaikie – of Otatara.
- John Francis Cody JP – of Masterton.
- Peter Douglas Hasselberg – of Wellington; lately Government Printer.
- Patrick Graham Millen – of Wellington; secretary of the Cabinet, clerk of the Executive Council and secretary and registrar of the Queen's Service Order.
- Robert George Norman – of Tītahi Bay; lately Commissioner of Works, Ministry of Works and Development.
- Elwyn Charles Richards JP – of Mount Maunganui.
- Allan Wheeler Seddon – of Dunedin.
- John Edwin Denys Stringleman – of Christchurch.
- Sydney Gordon Alexander Ward – of Auckland; superintendent, Auckland Maximum Security Prison, Department of Justice.

== Queen's Service Medal (QSM) ==
=== For community service ===
- Dorothy Mary Amoore – of Auckland.
- Ellis Walter Bott – of Levin.
- Margaret Kura Brown – of Wellington.
- Hilda Cocker – of Winton.
- Letitia Emily Coleman – of Christchurch.
- Jeanne Edgar – of Christchurch.
- Muriel Ethelwyn Fisher – of Auckland.
- Sam Hunt (Samuel Percival Hunt) – of Paremata.
- Grace Isabel Johnson – of Dunedin.
- Ropata Ki Keepa – of Taumarunui.
- Dougall Alexander Love – of Southbridge.
- William Leslie McIvor – of Nelson.
- Nancy Margaret McKenzie – of Timaru.
- Jack Raymond Matthews – of Featherston.
- Cecil Charles Leamoth Oldham – of Waikouaiti.
- Olive Roberta Olds – of Christchurch.
- Doris Palmer JP – of Rotorua.
- Doris Maude Penny JP – of Wellington.
- Joy Margaret Peters – of Upper Hutt.
- Margaret Beth Robertson – of Wellington.
- Mervyn Charles Smith – of Auckland.
- Agnes Tuisamoa – of Auckland.
- John Turei – of Auckland.
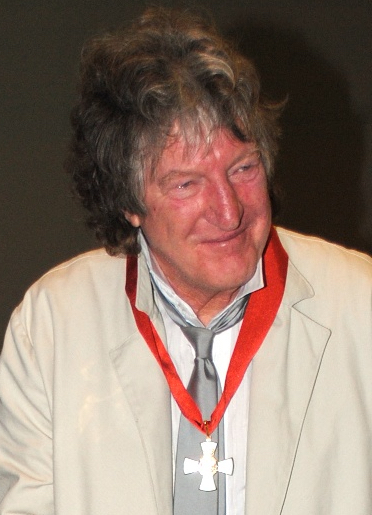
Sam Hunt

=== For public services ===
- John Keighley Banks JP – of Auckland.
- Leslie Pitman Clark JP – of Auckland.
- Bernard Dekker – of Tūrangi.
- Natalie Dumbleton – of Auckland.
- Joseph Alway Franklin – senior sergeant, New Zealand Police.
- Edith June Gardiner – of Waiau.
- Selwyn Watkin Gribble – of Auckland; head chauffeur, Public Service Garage, New Zealand Post Office, Auckland.
- Hineipoua Grindlay – of Auckland.
- Robert William Harley JP – of Dunedin.
- Hapeta Watene Hodges – senior constable, New Zealand Police.
- Hugh Stanley Hughes – of Ruatoria.
- Joseph Robert Hughes – of Hamilton.
- Joan Olive Marion Lawson – of Auckland.
- James McLay – of Papatoetoe; district probation officer, Department of Justice, Ōtāhuhu, 1958–1984.
- June Hinekahukura Mariu JP – of Auckland.
- Harris Patrick Martin – of Rotorua; lately director, Department of Maori Affairs, Rotorua.
- Stewart James Newton – of Dunedin.
- Frances Mary Parker – of Wellington.
- John Edridge Penketh – of Nelson.
- Sylvia Joan Spear – of Wellington; lately principal, Kimi Ora School, Wellington.
- Robert Steward – of Auckland; senior station officer Howick Volunteer Fire Brigade, New Zealand Fire Service.
- Harold Browning Turner JP – of Christchurch.
- Tuhimareikura Ofa Vahaakolo JP – of Auckland.
- Lucas Wilhelmus Vorgers – of Dunedin.
- Ellen Bernadette Young – senior constable, New Zealand Police.
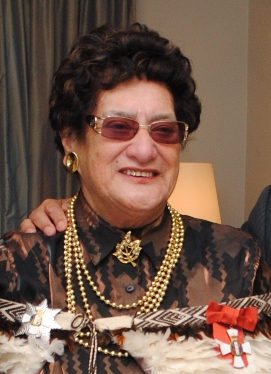
June Mariu

== Royal Red Cross ==
=== Member (RRC) ===
- Lieutenant Colonel Vera Ellen – Royal New Zealand Nursing Corps.

== Queen's Fire Service Medal (QFSM) ==
- Gordon Robert Brunskill – chief fire officer, Cambridge Volunteer Fire Brigade, New Zealand Fire Service.
- Rex Leonard Dally – fire commander and chief fire officer, Masterton Fire Brigade, New Zealand Fire Service.

== Air Force Cross (AFC) ==
- Squadron Leader Murray Wayne Sinclair – Royal New Zealand Air Force.

== Queen's Commendation for Valuable Service in the Air ==
- Master Air Electronics Operator Christopher Ewan Barry Allott – Royal New Zealand Air Force.
