= Greathead =

Greathead is a surname. Notable people with the surname include:

- Aston Greathead (1921–2012), New Zealand artist
- Greathead (1808 cricketer), 19th-century English cricketer for the MCC (first name unknown)
- Henry Greathead (1757–1818), British boat builder
- James Henry Greathead (1844–1896), British engineer
