= Ilse von Randow =

Weaver (1901–1998)

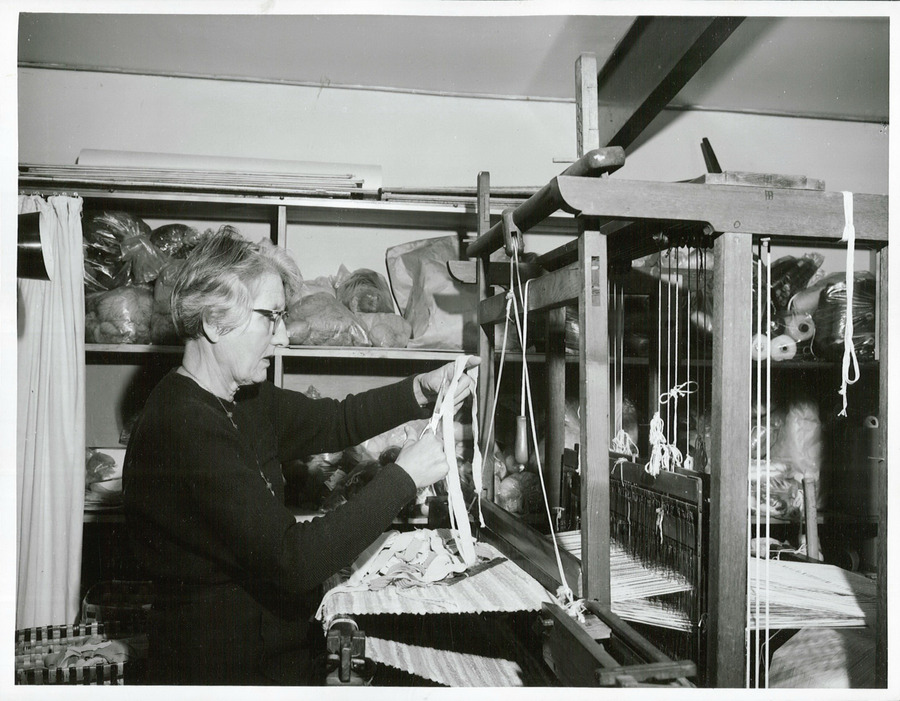
- Von Randow in 1965
- Born: Isle Henneberg; 12 June 1901; Giessen, Germany
- Died: 18 October 1998 (aged 97); Auckland, New Zealand
- Education: Berbenich art school in Darmstadt
- Known for: Weaving
- Notable work: Woven curtains commissioned for Auckland City Art Gallery
- Style: Modernism
- Awards: Esmonde Kohn Prize (1953)

Ilse Amalie Mathilde von Randow (née Henneberg, 12 June 1901 – 18 October 1998) was a New Zealand weaver.

== Life and career ==
Ilse von Randow was born in 1901 in Giessen, Germany. She was the daughter of Bruno Paul Eduard Henneberg, university professor, and Helene Mathilde Fritze. Her family was actively involved in artistic and scientific culture. In 1917 von Randow enrolled at the Berbenich art school in Darmstadt, where she studied until 1919 when changes in her family finances led her to quit her studies and returned home, taking up a job as a medical illustrator at Giessen University.

In 1927, von Randow moved to China, to become a laboratory technician at T’ung-Chi university, a German-language institute near Shanghai. She married Elgar Armin von Randow, German vice consul to Shanghai, in 1935, the couple had two sons, and divorced in 1945.

Von Randow had been taught to weave by her mother and she turned to these skills to support herself and her children, designing fabrics for local textile companies. She wove textiles and made curtains, cushions and lampshades for interiors. In 1949, when the communists took power in Shanghai in the Shanghai Campaign, von Randow sought refugee status for herself and her sons in New Zealand. They arrived in Auckland in April 1952.

In Auckland, von Randow met with Eric Westbrook, the new director at the Auckland Art Gallery, who offerred her a studio in the galleries tower. While working out of this studio, von Randow exhibited widely and established herself as a leading figure in modernist craft. She also became a founder of the Auckland Handweavers' Guild and taught younger weavers including Zena Abbott and Ida Lough. Her loom had been dismantled and shipped from China to New Zealand, with which she started to create hand woven wall hangings that made her famous. In 1954, she became vice-president of the Weavers Guild.

In the mid 1960s, von Randow became disillusioned with what she saw as an anti-modernist attitude amongst craft practitioners in New Zealand. In 1966, she left for England, settling in West Mersea, where she retired from weaving and took up first batik and later painting.

In 1992, von Randow returned to New Zealand to take part in the 1950s Show at the Auckland Art Gallery, and decided to remain to be closer to family. She died in Auckland on 18 October 1998, and her ashes were buried at Waikumete Cemetery.

== Work ==
Von Randow had a good relationship with the Auckland Art Gallery, weaving curtains and upholstery fabric for the gallery and teaching summer schools. Von Randow's major public work was a set of curtains commissioned for the Auckland City Art Gallery in December 1957. Completed in 1958, the curtains were the largest piece of handweaving created in New Zealand at that date. They took four months to weave and including eight separate strips which were sewn together to reveal a large-scale abstract design featuring triange, diamond, and zig-zag shapes. The curtains are now held in the collection of the Auckland Museum.

Von Randow collaborated with Colin McCahon to create, Woven Kauri, a kauri that hung at the entrance to the Auckland Art Gallery, but was lost in the 1960s after a renovation.

By the mid-1960s, the weaving community because increasingly interested in creating a 'New Zealand style' and von Randow, feeling she had contributed all she could to the movement, moved to London without her loom.

A retrospective of her work was held at the Auckland War Memorial Museum in 1998. She donated her workbooks and weaving samples from the length of her career to the museum.

Despite planning to stay in England, von Randow returned to New Zealand in the 1990s to be closer to her family. She died in 1998 at age 97.

In 2013, von Randow's curtains were the subject of a project at the Auckland Art Gallery by contemporary New Zealand artist Ruth Buchanan.

== Awards ==
- 1953: Esmonde Kohn Prize for excellence in the applied arts by the Auckland Society of Arts

== Further information ==
- Douglas Lloyd-Jenkins, The textiles of Ilse von Randow, Auckland: Auckland Museum, 1998. ISBN 0473051478
- Douglas Lloyd-Jenkins, 'Weaving Light: Ilse von Randow and Colin McCahon', Art New Zealand, no 94, Autumn 2000.
