= Geoff Blakely =

New Zealand cricketer

Personal information
- Full name: Geoffrey Allan Wilfred Blakely
- Born: 30 October 1959 (age 67); Ranfurly, Central Otago, New Zealand
- Batting: Left-handed
- Relatives: Sam Blakely (son)

Domestic team information
- Years: Team
- 1980/81–1984/85: Otago

Career statistics
Competition	First-class	List A
Matches	9	2
Runs scored	325	55
Batting average	18.05	27.50
100s/50s	0/1	0/0
Top score	74	44
Catches/stumpings	4/–	0/–
- Source: ESPNcricinfo, 30 January 2021

Rugby union career
- Position: Lock
Provincial / State sides
Years	Team	Apps	(Points)
1981	Otago Sub-Unions	1	

Geoffrey Allan Wilfred Blakely (born 30 October 1959) is a New Zealand former cricketer. He played nine first-class and two List A matches for Otago between 1980 and 1985.

Blakely was an opening batsman. His best two first-class matches were both against Auckland in 1980–81. In the first, at Eden Park, he made 74 and 22; in the second, at Carisbrook, he made 26 and 43. In all first-class matches he made 325 runs at an average of 18.05. Blakely also appeared in two List A matches for Otago, scoring 55 runs at an average of 27.50 with a top score of 44.

As a rugby union footballer, Blakely made one appearance playing at lock for Otago Sub-Unions in 1981.

Two of Blakely's children have also played representative cricket for Otago: his son Sam, has played five List A matches for Otago, debuting in 2012/13; and his daughter Caitlin has made over 100 women's List A and Twenty20 appearances for Otago since the 2012/13 season. It is believed that this could be the first instance of a father, son and daughter all representing Otago in top-level cricket.
