= Geert Arend Roorda =

Dutch football player and manager (born 1988)

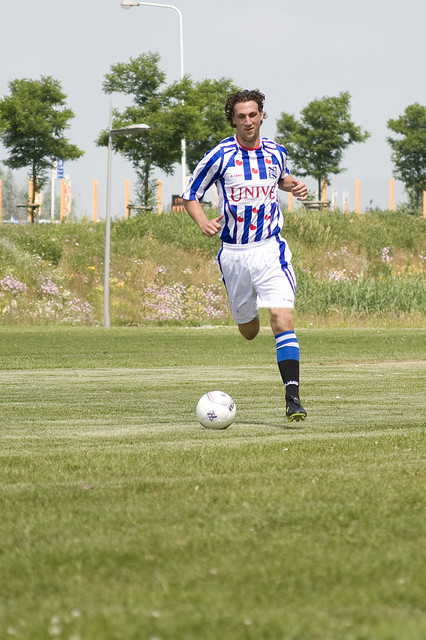

Personal information
- Date of birth: 2 March 1988 (age 38)
- Place of birth: Heerenveen, Netherlands
- Height: 1.90 m (6 ft 3 in)
- Position: Midfielder

Team information
- Current team: Excelsior Maassluis (head coach)

Youth career
- VV Noordbergum

Senior career*
Years	Team	Apps	(Gls)
2007–2012	SC Heerenveen	46	(2)
2010–2011	→ Excelsior (loan)	13	(8)
2012–2014	NEC	14	(0)
2014	Sparta Rotterdam	7	(0)
2015–2016	Dordrecht	14	(2)
2016	Richmond	21	(4)
2016–2017	Flevo Boys		

International career
2007	Netherlands U21	1	(0)

Managerial career
- 2016: Richmond (youth)
- 2018–2020: Sparta Rotterdam (youth)
- 2018–2023: Sparta Rotterdam (video analyst)
- 2020–2023: Jong Sparta
- 2023–2025: RKC Waalwijk (assistant)
- 2025–: Excelsior Maassluis
- * Club domestic league appearances and goals

Geert Arend Roorda (Dutch pronunciation: [ˈɣeːrt ˈaːrənt ˈroːrdaː], born 2 March 1988) is a Dutch professional football manager and former player who is the head coach of Tweede Divisie club Excelsior Maassluis.

== Career ==
=== Early career ===
Roorda started out by playing for amateur club "vv Noordbergum" but since he was eight years old he could be found around the Abe Lenstra Stadion. When he was a second year D he played with the C team and a second years C he played with the B team. He was always a year ahead of the curve.

=== sc Heerenveen ===
At age 19 he finished high school at the havo level (which combined school and football with an adapted timetable) and focuses now fully on his professional career and sc Heerenveen. Roorda is since season 2007/2008 part of the first selection after he impressed in the pre-season, in which he scored a wonderful free kick versus Sivasspor.

Gertjan Verbeek used him as a substitute five times in season 2007/08 so far. On 19 September 2007 he was named by the coach to be one of the starting eleven in the UEFA cup game versus Helsingborgs IF. Verbeek said Roorda compelled admiration for his appearance in the competition versus Excelsior on 15 September. He commented: "Geert is a good player, age doesn't matter whether you're 18 or 21". It meant his debut as a starter for Heerenveen.

After missing a year due to injuries, he made his return to Eredivisie football on 12 April 2009.

=== NEC ===
After losing prospect on play time, he left to NEC in the summer of 2012. Unfortunately, his staying at his new club turned out to be a disappointment. After only playing 14 matches in one and a half season, partly caused by injuries, he left as a free agent in January 2014.

=== Sparta Rotterdam ===
He signed with Sparta in January 2014, but could not impress and was released half a season later, having played just seven matches for the Rotterdam side.

=== Dordrecht ===
On 31 July 2015, it was announced that Roorda had signed a one-year deal with Eerste Divisie side FC Dordrecht.

=== Richmond SC ===
In December 2015, it was announced that Roorda would be moving to Victoria, Australia, Australia to join Richmond SC in the National Premier Leagues Victoria.

=== Retirement ===
In November 2016, Roorda joined Hoofdklasse club Flevo Boys, close to his residence in Lemmer. In April 2017, Roorda announced his retirement from football, instead choosing to focus on a career as a youth coach.

== International career ==
He played for the national youth teams Oranje −17 and Oranje −19. Due to many injuries (hamstring, ankle, hip and both knees), of which the heaviest was a knee injury that kept him off the pitch for almost ten months (hence missing out one year of international youth football).

=== Under 17 and under 19 ===
In October 2004 he got his first invitation for Oranje −17. Thereafter he played two games, versus Armenia and Turkey. He scored in the European Cup qualification game against Turkey. Due to a hip injury he had to mis out on the European Championships in Italy. In September 2005 he flew with his team to Peru for the World Cup. The Oranje −17 squad lost to Mexico (0–4) in the semi-finals, but the équipe of coach Ruud Kaiser had its revenge in the third place play-off against Turkey (2–1). Roorda played just 75 minutes in all the tournament in very many positions. He was used as a defender, midfielder and striker.

Kaiser described his pupil as follows: 'He is a right wing midfielder and he can also be used as an attacking midfielder. He's a skilled player with a good pass and he can create chances. He's got insight, power and can also be used as a target man'

=== Under-21 ===
He was called up by Netherlands coach Foppe de Haan as one of the three new faces (together with Lorenzo Davids and Dirk Marcellis) to take on Estonia on 12 October 2007. In Tallinn he made his debut in the 2009 UEFA European Under-21 Championship qualifier. De Haan commented: "He does very well at the moment, he has a strong physique and a certain drive. I think this debut will get him even further, besides, he gives the team a lift" With his debut he tread in the steps of other (former) Frisian footballers such as Ronnie Pander and Max Houttuin.

== Statistics ==
Club Performance
Club	Season	(Netherlands) Eredivisie		Dutch Cup		Europe		Play-offs		Total
Club	Season	App	Goals	App	Goals	App	Goals	App	Goals	App	Goals
SC Heerenveen	2007–08	12	0	0	0	1	0	-	-	13	0
Total		22	2	0	0	1	0	–	–	23	2
Updated 14:01, 5 January 2008 (UTC)

== Honours ==
- KNVB Cup: 1

2009
