= Harry Whale =

Professor of physics at University of Auckland in New Zealand (1921–2009)

Henry Arthur Whale (14 February 1921 – 11 September 2009) was a professor of physics at the University of Auckland.

Whale was born in Windsor, England in 1921, the son of Frank Arthur Whale. He had his secondary schooling at Auckland Grammar School before studying science at the University of Auckland, from where he graduated M.Sc. in 1946.

He married Natalie Stella Clarke in 1942, the daughter of Joseph Clarke. They had one daughter. He won two scholarships to Trinity College, Cambridge (one of which was the 1851 Research Fellowship), and the family relocated to England for his PhD studies. He used a differential analyser in his PhD studies, an early form of computer, and purchased the machine in 1948 for £100. The family returned to New Zealand in 1950, and Whale brought the differential analyser with him; the computer is these days on display at the Museum of Transport and Technology in Auckland. He took up the chair of the Radio Research Centre in the Department of Physics at the University of Auckland; the position was especially created for him. His area of research was long-distance radio, and he supervised between 60 and 70 PhD and Masters students during his time at Auckland University. Whale was invited by Bill Pickering to the Goddard Space Flight Center to undertake research on the reasons for loss of communication when rockets pass through the ionosphere. Whale was a visiting professor at the University of Illinois at Chicago in 1969, and the University of California in 1969–1970.

Whale received the T. K. Sidey Medal in 1955, set up by the Royal Society of New Zealand as an award for outstanding scientific research. He died on 11 September 2009.

== Bibliography ==
- Whale, H.A. (1969). Effects of Ionospheric Scattering on Very-Long-Distance Radio Communication.
