= Zena Abbott =

New Zealand weaver and teacher

- Born: Zena Elva Mary Andrews; 21 April 1922; Auckland, New Zealand
- Died: 6 November 1993 (aged 71); Auckland, New Zealand
- Known for: Weaving, teaching
- Awards: Esmonde Kohn Prize (1976)

Zena Elva Mary Abbott (née Andrews, 21 April 1922 – 6 November 1993) was a New Zealand weaver. Her works are held at the Auckland War Memorial Museum and the Dowse Art Museum.

== Early life and introduction to weaving ==
Abbott was born in Auckland in 1922. Growing up in Depression-era New Zealand, Abbott left school at the age of thirteen to become a dressmaker, and was subsequently drafted into essential work during World War Two. During the 1950s, she travelled around New Zealand, living in a caravan and working as a sewing machine instructor.

Abbott first studied weaving with German-born weaver Ilse von Randow at the Auckland City Art Gallery in 1952. Abbott acquired her own loom and began experimenting with unspun wool and natural dyes and fibres. While studying, Abbott sold Elna sewing machines out in rural Auckland.

== Career as a weaver ==
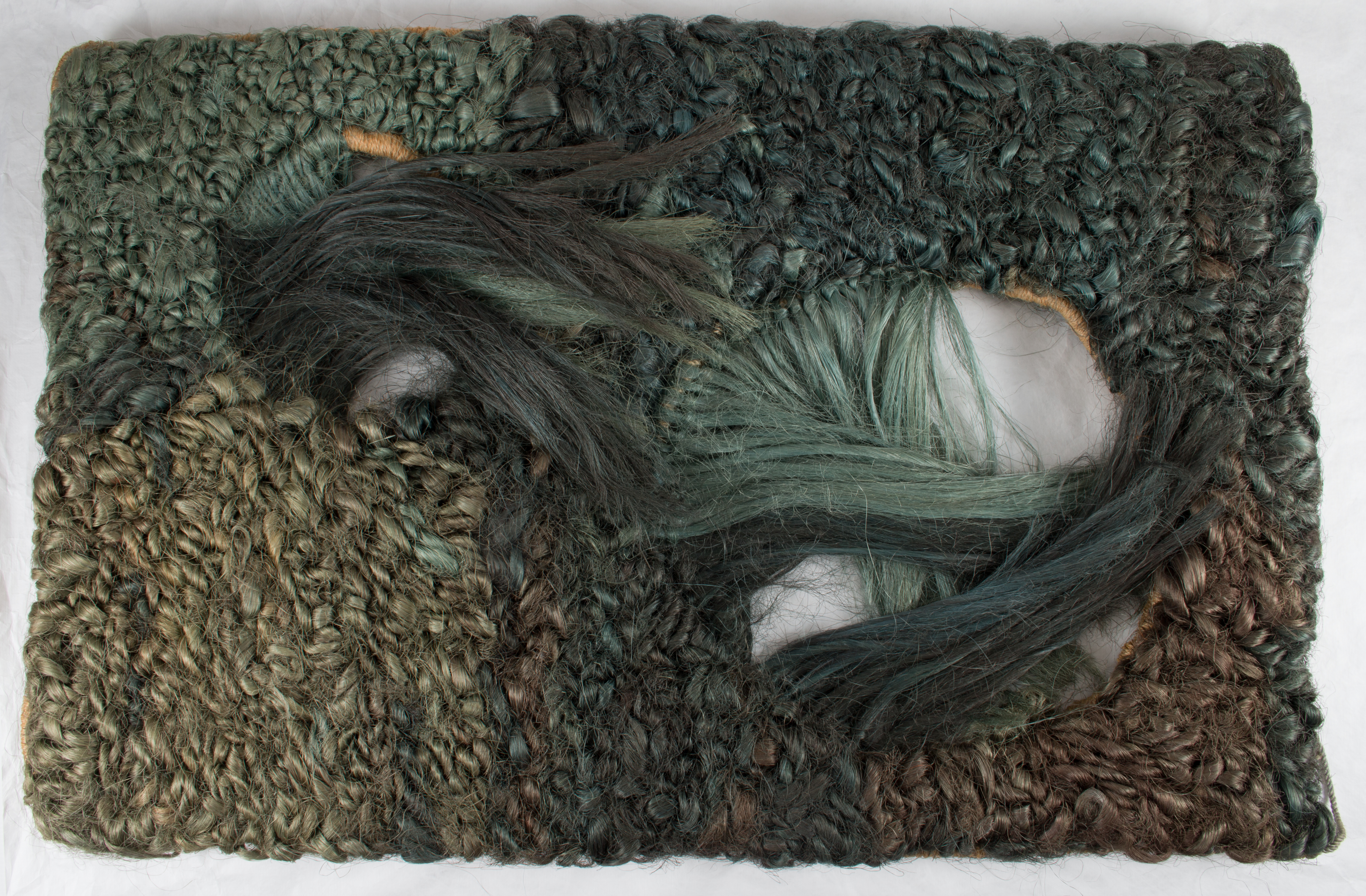
"Caskade" by Zena Abbott.

In 1959, her work was shown in the Auckland City Art Gallery in An Exhibition of New Zealand Craft Work, alongside artists such as Doreen Blumhardt, Barry Brickell, Len Castle, Helen Mason, Patricia Charlotte Perrin and Mirek Smíšek.

In her work Abbott used natural and artificial dyes, and materials ranging from art silk and flax fibre to alkathene piping and burglar alarm tape. Her first piece of weaving was a finger twisted rug and it sold within three hours.

Abbott was a founding member of the Weaver Guilds and in 1954 exhibited with them at the Auckland City Gallery. From the late 1950s Abbott became interested in 'extending the traditional boundaries of weaving into three-dimensional constructions'. In 1958 Abbott opened a professional handweaving studio in Blockhouse Bay, Auckland. From the studio she ran a small-scale commercial operation, teaching and employing several women and selling her work through craft shops and galleries throughout New Zealand. Abbott exported her work to Australia, and exhibited in Australia, England, Canada and the United States.

In 1964, Abbott became a member of the World Craft Council, joining the New Zealand chapter. In 1968, Abbott was one of the founding members of Brown's Mill Market, New Zealand’s first craft co-operative, located in an old flour mill in Durham Lane, Auckland. In 1976, she won the Kohn Award at the Auckland Society of Art.

In 1986 her work was featured in Elizabeth Eastmond and Merimeri Penfold's book Women and the arts in New Zealand - Forty Works: 1936-86: the work the authors chose to reproduce was Scrolls (1980), a large sculptural piece made up of a triptych of wall hangings and two large woven scrolls placed on the floor, which viewers were encouraged to unroll to reveal the woven text 'From thorny plants the hidden fibre', which referenced the sisal derived from cactus plants which was one of her favourite materials.

Ian Spalding wrote:

By her work with the Handweavers Guild and the New Zealand chapter of the World Crafts Council, by her generous sharing of techniques and by her continuing help and encouragement Zena Abbott has been an inspiration to hundreds of weavers and has made an inestimable contribution to the development of the craft in N.Z.

A 2004 retrospective was held for her work at the Corban Estate Arts Centre, curated by Tanya Wilkinson. In 2019 to 2020 the Dowse held an exhibition on Abbott's work called Zena Abbott & Emma Fitts: Nomads. Works of Abbott are held at the Auckland War Memorial Museum and the Dowse Art Museum.
