= Joseph Henry Cock =

New Zealand shipping company manager and art patron

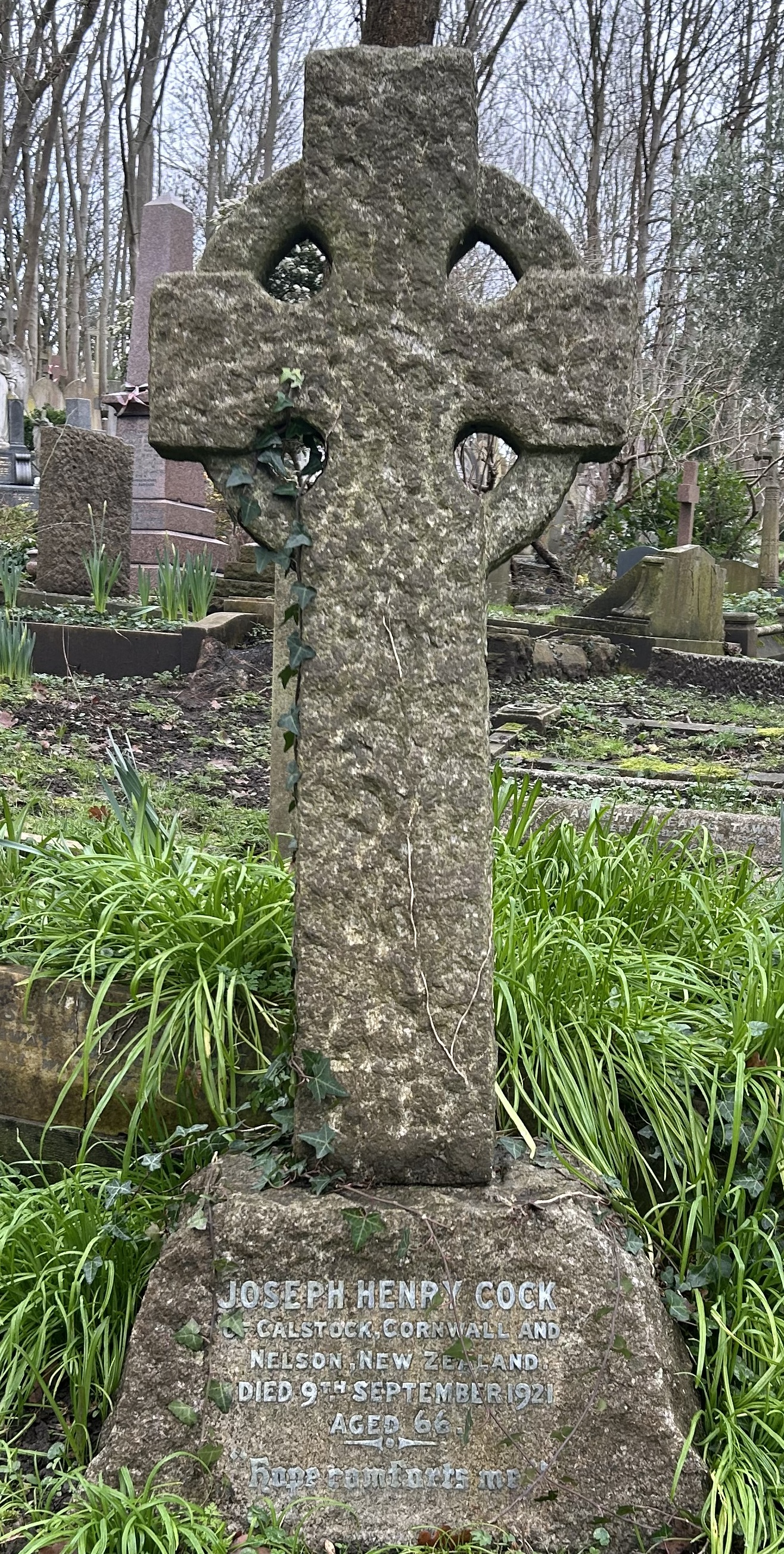
Grave of Joseph Henry Cock in Highgate Cemetery

Joseph Henry Cock (25 January 1855 – 9 September 1921) was a New Zealand shipping company manager and patron of the arts. He was born in Calstock, Cornwall, England on 25 January 1855. He is buried at Highgate Cemetery.
