= Les Harmer =

New Zealand cricket umpire

Personal information
- Born: 12 March 1921; Greenwich, London, England
- Died: 24 May 2007 (aged 86); Dunedin, New Zealand

Umpiring information
- ODIs umpired: 1 (1974)
- Source: Cricinfo, 18 May 2014

Les Harmer (12 March 1921 – 24 May 2007) was a New Zealand cricket umpire. At the international level, the only fixture that he officiated in was a One Day International game in 1974.

== See also ==
- List of One Day International cricket umpires
