= Liam Higgins (New Zealand footballer) =

New Zealand footballer (born 1993)

Personal information
- Date of birth: 27 September 1993 (age 33)
- Place of birth: Lower Hutt, New Zealand
- Positions: Left-back; centre-back

Youth career
- Wellington Phoenix
- –2012: Lower Hutt City

Senior career*
Years	Team	Apps	(Gls)
2012–2013	YoungHeart Manawatu	8	(0)
2013	Noble Park United	10	(1)
2013–2015	WaiBOP United	14	(3)
2015	Stop Out	25	(1)
2015	Team Wellington	8	(0)
2016	Richmond SC	12	(0)
2016–2017	South Springvale	18	(0)
2018–2019	Staines Town	0	(0)
2021–2022	Box Hill United	12	(1)
2023-2025	Endeavour Fire FC	82	(-1)
2026–	Heatherton FC	1	(0)

International career
2011–2013	New Zealand U20	14	(0)
2015	New Zealand U23	2	(0)
2015	New Zealand	1	(0)
- * Club domestic league appearances and goals

Liam Higgins (born 27 September 1993) is a New Zealand association footballer who most recently played for English club Staines Town.

== Club career ==
Higgins began his career in his native New Zealand signing for local ASB Premiership side Team Wellington based out of Dave Farringdon Park before a move to YoungHeart Manawatu followed.

After spending the 2013 season in Australia at Noble Park United, he joined WaiBOP United for the 2013–14 ASB Premiership season.

In 2015, Higgins spent the winter season at Stop Out in the Central League then joined Team Wellington for the 2015–16 ASB Premiership.

Higgins joined Richmond SC in February 2016.

Higgins joined English Non league club Staines Town in 2018 where an ankle injury sidelined him for the season and looked to have prematurely ended his career.

== International career ==
Higgins was first selected to represent New Zealand U20s for the 2011 FIFA U-20 World Cup, held in Colombia. He was also selected for the New Zealand U-20s for the 2013 tournament, held in Turkey.

In 2015 Higgins was selected for both the New Zealand U23, and the New Zealand senior team. U23s coach Anthony Hudson selected Higgins in his U23 squad to compete in the 2015 Pacific Games.

Higgins call-up to the senior team occurred for their friendly against Myanmar on 7 September 2015. He came off the bench in the dying minutes of the second half to record his first senior cap, in a 1–1 draw.
