= Howard Hutchinson =

New Zealand footballer

Personal information
- Full name: Howard D Hutchinson
- Date of birth: 13 February 1921
- Place of birth: New Zealand
- Date of death: 14 February 2012 (aged 91)

Senior career*
Years	Team	Apps	(Gls)
- Mount Albert Grammar

International career
1947–1948	New Zealand	4	(0)
- * Club domestic league appearances and goals

Howard Hutchinson (1921-2012) was an association football player who represented New Zealand at international level.

Hutchinson made his full All Whites debut in a 3–8 loss to South Africa on 12 July 1947 and ended his international playing career with four A-international caps to his credit, his final cap an appearance in a 1–8 loss to Australia on 11 September 1948.
