= Agnes TuiSamoa =

New Zealand community organiser and social worker

Agnes Rosa TuiSamoa QSM (née Sue; 7 December 1932 – 17 November 2004) was a Pacific community organizer and social worker in Auckland, New Zealand.

== Biography ==
TuiSamoa was born in Suva, Fiji, to a Samoan mother, Apaula Theresa Perera, and Chinese father, Harry Sue. Her parents separated when she was young and TuiSamoa was raised by her godmother and foster father until she was 10 years old, when she went to live with her mother. She was educated in Catholic schools and attended a business college. In 1951, she moved to Western Samoa, and in 1953 she moved to New Zealand.

== Works ==
In New Zealand, she settled in Auckland and began training to be a nurse at Catholic Mater Misericordiae Hospital. She encountered racism and resigned to work in the accounts department of Auckland Hospital's laundry unit instead. She also began working as a volunteer at her church, Pacific Island Presbyterian Church in Newton, helping Pacific families who had recently arrived from the islands and were struggling to adjust to urban life.

In 1975, TuiSamoa began to work in professional community and social work; she joined the Auckland Methodist Central Mission and worked in its Pacific Centre. Her work included helping families with immigration and legal issues, finance and budgeting, domestic violence, and drug and alcohol problems. In 1977, she completed a certificate in community studies from the University of Auckland and later became involved in the Pacific Advisory Committee for the new School of Social Work at the Auckland College of Education.

In the early 1970s, she worked with anti-racism groups and supported tenants at risk of eviction. In 1978, she helped establish the Grey Lynn Neighbourhood Law Office, which provided free legal advice. Later in the 1970s, she also helped set up or support women’s refuges, an organisation to assist alcoholics, the Grey Lynn Community Housing Society, a residential housing programme for homeless young people, and Pillars, an organisation supporting children with parents in prison.

In the 1980s, she helped establish the first full-immersion Pacific Island language early childhood centre in Auckland, A’oga Fa’a Samoa. She was also involved in a successful legal challenge to New Zealand’s immigration policies in 1982, which enabled many Western Samoans to become New Zealand citizens.

TuiSamoa sat on a number of committees that advised local and central government, including the Samoan Council of Women and the Pacific Island Advisory Council. She also worked in the Labour Party’s Auckland Central electorate office, and represented New Zealand at the 1975 Pacific Women’s Conference in Suva. From 1988 to 1994, she was a trustee of the ASB Community Trust, an organisation that provides grants to groups in Auckland and Northland. In the 1985 Queen's Birthday Honours, TuiSamoa received the Queen's Service Medal for community service. She retired from social work in the early 2000s.

== Personal life ==
TuiSamoa had her first child in 1954 in Auckland; she was unmarried and after six months her mother took the baby to Fiji. In 1955, TuiSamoa married Keresipi Tuisamoa and the couple had nine children together. Her eldest child returned to Auckland to live with the family when he was six years old.
