= Anne Delamere =

New Zealand public servant

Anne Delamere DCNZM QSO
- Born: Anne Anituatua Delamere; 15 May 1921; Rotorua, New Zealand
- Died: 26 May 2006 (aged 85); Wellington, New Zealand
- Occupation: Public servant
- Relatives: Tuariki Delamere (nephew)

Anne Anituatua Delamere DCNZM QSO (15 May 1921 – 26 May 2006) was a New Zealand public servant.

== Biography ==
Born in Rotorua on 15 May 1921, Delamere was of Māori descent, affiliating to Te Whānau-ā-Apanui and Te Arawa. She was educated at Queen Victoria School in Auckland, and saw military service in the New Zealand Women's Auxiliary Air Force between 1942 and 1947.

== Military service ==
During Delamere's time in the New Zealand Women's Auxiliary Air Force she was based at Defence Headquarters in Wellington, working in the team that coordinated the Māori war effort.

When thinking back on her time in the Air Force, Delamere said:

In 1942 I came to Wellington and joined up with the Women’s Auxiliary Air Force [WAAF] based at Rongotai. … Later, I took up a job with the Telephone Exchange. We were brought to the Post Office and trained in that work. I reached the rank of sergeant, and was there until 1950. The war was over but it was good work and I stayed on.

== Career ==
In 1950, Delamere was recruited as a welfare officer by the Department of Maori Affairs and initially worked in Whakatāne. She was closely involved in the foundation of the Māori Women's Welfare League in 1951. She was awarded a tertiary scholarship and studied at Victoria University of Wellington from 1958 to 1959, where she completed a Diploma of Social Science.

After completing her diploma, Delamere remained in Wellington at the Department of Maori Affairs. In 1961, she was involved in the establishment of the Māori Education Foundation, and she was also involved with liaising between Maori Affairs and a wide range of government and community groups. She rose to become a senior executive officer in the Department of Maori Affairs.

== Awards and legacy ==
In the 1985 Queen's Birthday Honours, Delamere was appointed a Companion of the Queen's Service Order for community service. In the 2004 New Year Honours, she was appointed a Distinguished Companion of the New Zealand Order of Merit, for services to Māori. She was also conferred life membership of the Māori Women's Welfare League.

Delamere died in Wellington on 26 May 2006.
