= Sam Blakely =

New Zealand cricketer (born 1993)

Personal information
- Full name: Samuel Geoffrey Blakely
- Born: 16 June 1993 (age 33); Dunedin, Otago, New Zealand
- Batting: Right-handed
- Bowling: Right-arm fast-medium
- Relatives: Geoff Blakely (father)

Domestic team information
- Years: Team
- 2012/13–2014/15: Otago
- Source: ESPNcricinfo, 6 May 2016

Samuel Geoffrey Blakely (born 16 June 1993) is a New Zealand cricketer. He played five List A matches for Otago between the 2012–13 and 2014–15 seasons. He was the third member of his family to play for the province, after his father, Geoff Blakely, and sister Caitlin Blakely.
