= Kimi Ora School =

Location
- 100 Walter Street, Naenae, Lower Hutt & Kemp Street, Kilbirnie, Wellington; 41.1973361°S 174.9428642°E

Information
- Type: State co-ed special school on five sites
- Established: 1951 in Thorndon, relocated in 2011 Kimi Ora Base School Naenae and Evans Bay Satellite Unit
- Ministry of Education Institution no.: 514
- Principal: Shirley Jones
- Enrolment: 137 (July 2026)
- Socio-economic decile: 8
- Website: Kimiora School

Kimi Ora School Wellington is a special needs school in Wellington, New Zealand, for students with disabilities. Kimi ora is Maori for "seeking well-being in health" or "to be made whole".

Kimi Ora Specialist School caters for high and very high special needs pupils of primary and secondary school age to adulthood, or ages 5 to 21, and draws pupils from the Wellington region, up to the Kapiti Coast and the Hutt Valley.

The school had been located in Thorndon for nearly 60 years before it was decided to leave the area in 2011 allowing it to increase its roll. The move allowed Kimi Ora to increase its roll from 35 to 40 students (22 at Naenae and 18 at Evans Bay). In the beginning of 2011 the new Kimi Ora Base School was opened next to the existing intermediate schools in Naenae (Lower Hutt) and a satellite unit in Evans Bay (Kilbirnie). The Base School has been awarded by the New Zealand Green Building Council with a 5 Star Green Star NZ – Education 2009 Certified Rating.

Kimi Ora School now has a roll of 99 students as at 2023. There are now six sites covering the Lower Hutt and Wellington region. The Base school in Naenae, a satellite with 4 classes at Naenae Collage, a satellite with 3 classes located at Pomare Primary School in Lower Hutt, a satellite with 1 class located in the Manaaki Disability Trust in Lower Hutt, a satellite with 3 classes at Miramar Central School in Wellington and a satellite with 3 classes located on the grounds of Evans Bay Intermediate in Wellington.
