= Desmond O'Donnell =

New Zealand rugby union player

- Born: Desmond Hillary O'Donnell; 7 October 1921 Palmerston North, New Zealand
- Died: 18 January 1992 (aged 70) Wellington, New Zealand
- Height: 1.83 m (6 ft 0 in)
- Weight: 90 kg (200 lb)
- School: St Patrick's College, Silverstream
- Occupation: Schoolteacher

Rugby union career
- Position: Prop
Provincial / State sides
Years	Team	Apps	(Points)
1945–51	Wellington		
International career
Years	Team	Apps	(Points)
1949	New Zealand	1	(0)

Desmond Hillary O'Donnell (7 October 1921 – 18 January 1992) was a New Zealand rugby union player. A prop, O'Donnell represented Wellington at a provincial level from 1945 to 1951. He played for the New Zealand national side, the All Blacks, in one match, the second test against the touring Australian team in 1949.
