= Shirley Tonkin =

Paediatrician and infant death syndrome researcher

Shirley Tonkin OBE
- Born: Shirley Lyford Curtis; 6 June 1921; Stratford, New Zealand
- Died: 27 January 2016 (aged 94); Auckland, New Zealand
- Education: University of Otago
- Known for: Sudden infant death syndrome research
- Spouse: John Carvossoe Stephen Tonkin (m. 1947; died 1988)
- Scientific career
- Fields: Paediatrics

Shirley Lyford Tonkin OBE (née Curtis, 6 June 1921 – 27 January 2016) was a New Zealand paediatrican and sudden infant death syndrome researcher.

== Early life and family ==
Born in Stratford on 6 June 1921, Tonkin was the younger daughter of Nora Bessie Curtis (née Lyford) and her husband, Leslie Ralfe Curtis. She was educated at Samuel Marsden Collegiate School in Wellington from 1937 to 1938. She then studied medicine at the University of Otago, graduating MB ChB in 1946.

She married John Carvossoe Stephen Tonkin on 5 April 1947. The couple had two children.

== Medical career ==
After a residency at New Plymouth Hospital between 1945 and 1947, Tonkin then worked in the accident and emergency department at Napier Hospital from 1947 to 1950. A period as a general practitioner from 1950 to 1952, was followed by study at the Institute of Child Health in London, where she completed a Diploma of Child Health. Returning to New Zealand, Tonkin worked as a medical officer at the Department of Health in Auckland from 1954 to 1978.

Tonkin researched cot death for 30 years, and was recognised as an international expert in the field. Her work resulted in the formulation of national guidelines for babies' sleeping conditions. She was the founder of the New Zealand Cot Death Association in 1979, and was credited with renaming "cot death" as "sudden infant death syndrome". A child safety advocate, Tonkin was one of the three researchers who developed a foam insert for children's car seats to reduce the risk of choking to infants.

== Honours and awards ==
In the 1985 Queen's Birthday Honours, Tonkin was appointed an Officer of the Order of the British Empire, for services to medicine and welfare.

== Death ==
Tonkin died at her home in Auckland on 27 January 2016.
