= Jacob Skeen =

New Zealand rugby player (born 1993)

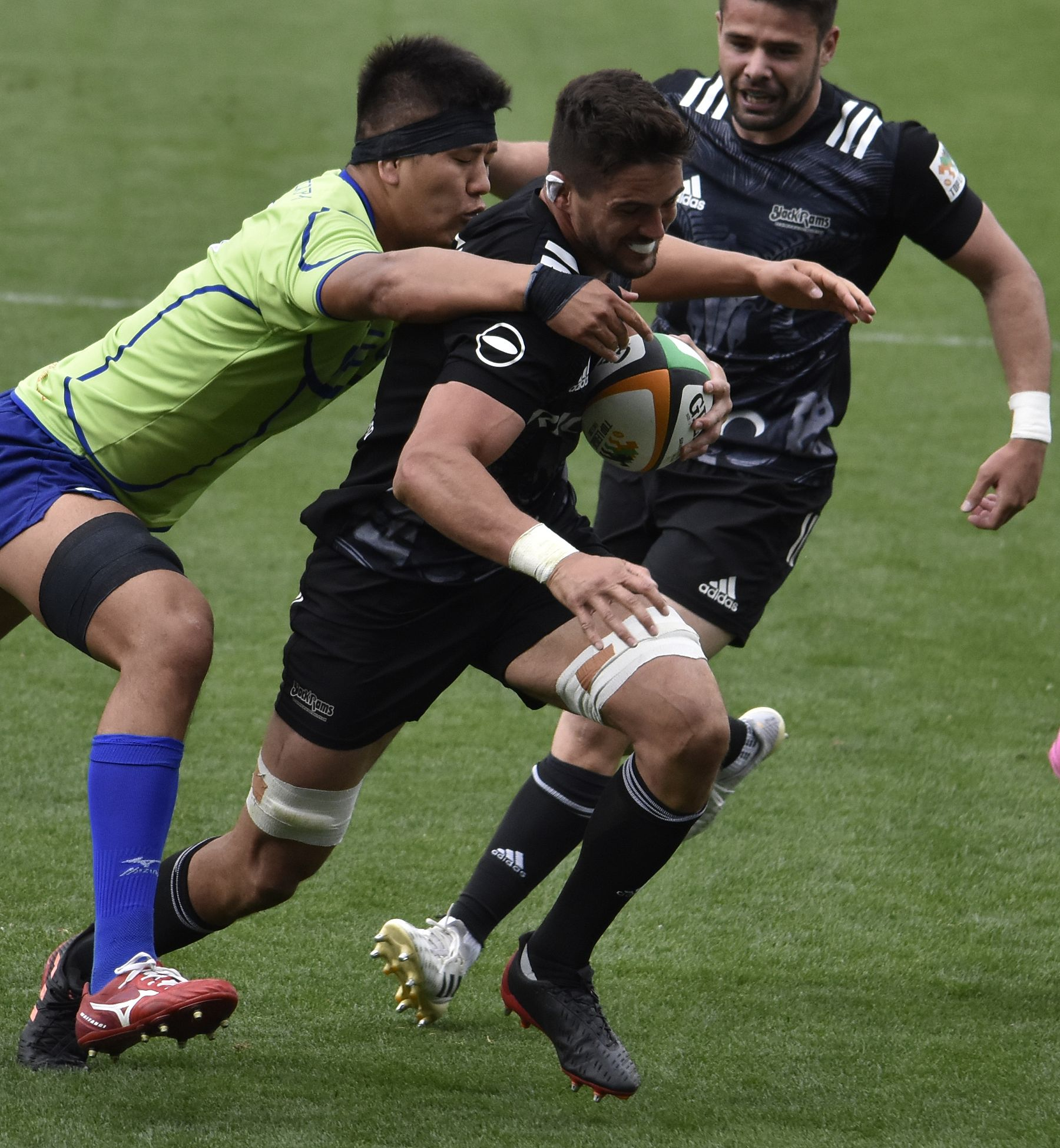
- Born: 7 April 1993 (age 33) Tairua, Waikato, New Zealand
- Height: 2.01 m (6 ft 7 in)
- Weight: 115 kg (254 lb)
- School: Mercury Bay Area School, Hamilton Boys' High School

Rugby union career
- Position: Lock
- Current team: Ricoh Black Rams
Senior career
Years	Team	Apps	(Points)
2018–2025	Ricoh Black Rams	28	(5)
- Correct as of 21 February 2021
Provincial / State sides
Years	Team	Apps	(Points)
2014–2017	Waikato	28	(0)
- Correct as of 21 February 2021
International career
Years	Team	Apps	(Points)
2015–2016	Māori All Blacks	2	(0)
- Correct as of 21 February 2021

Jacob Skeen (born 7 April 1993) is a New Zealand rugby union player. He plays in the lock position for provincial side Waikato and for New Zealand's māori international side the Māori All Blacks.
