= Allan Fa'alava'au =

- Born: 15 November 1993 (age 32) Auckland, New Zealand
- Height: 1.69 m (5 ft 7 in)
- Weight: 82 kg (181 lb)

Rugby union career
National sevens team
Years	Team	Comps
2012-	Australia 7s	

Allan Fa'alava'au (born 15 November 1993) is a professional rugby union player. He represents Australia in sevens rugby. Born in Auckland, New Zealand and playing for Endeavour Hills at a club level, he debuted for Australia in February 2012. As of December 2015, he currently has 21 caps.

A butcher by trade, Allan Fa'alava'au impressed during his first season with the Australian Men's Sevens side after being called up as injury cover for the Las Vegas 7s in 2012. A former Australian Schools representative, Allan continued to add to his already impressive resume in 2012 when he was named to the Australian Under-20 side for the Junior World Championship in South Africa. He was granted his Australian citizenship in November 2014. Representative honours include the Australian Schools (2011) and Australian Under-20 (2012).

He competed at the 2016 Summer Olympics.
