= Robert Kirkpatrick Simpson =

New Zealand politician

Robert Kirkpatrick Simpson (1837 – 5 August 1921) was a member of the New Zealand Legislative Council from 14 July 1914 to 13 July 1921, when his term ended. He was appointed by the Reform Government.

He was from Marton, and he died at his home there on 5 August 1921.
