= Jim Little (businessman) =

Canadian sports executive

CEO of The Ottawa Senators
- In office January 10, 2020 – March 4, 2020
- Preceded by: Eugene Melnyk (as acting CEO)
- Succeeded by: Eugene Melnyk (as acting CEO)

Personal details
- Born: 1964 (age 61–62) Montreal, Quebec, Canada
- Children: 2
- Education: McGill University

Jim Little (born 1964) is a Canadian business executive who briefly was the CEO of the Ottawa Senators in 2020.

== Biography ==
Little was born in Montreal, Quebec, and has a bachelor's degree from McGill University. and began his career in Ottawa.

He was hired by the Ottawa Senators after Chief Operating Officer Nic Ruszkowski abruptly left, leaving owner Eugene Melnyk as acting CEO.

Prior to joining the Senators Little was an EVP with Shaw Communications, as well as stints as an executive with Royal Bank of Canada (2008–2012), Bombardier Aerospace and Bell Canada.
