= Joan Faulkner-Blake =

New Zealand broadcaster (1921–1990)

- Born: Joan Isabel Faulkner; 30 January 1921; Cambridge, New Zealand
- Died: 6 March 1990 (aged 69); Hāwera, New Zealand
- Occupation: broadcaster

Joan Faulkner-Blake (30 January 1921 – 6 March 1990) was a professional New Zealand broadcaster in the mid to late twentieth century.

Faulkner was born Joan Isabel Faulkner to Edward Ernest Faulkner and Rhoda Vera Faulkner (née White) in Cambridge, Waikato. After training as a journalist at the Dominion newspaper in Wellington and marrying Norman Blake at Napier in 1941, Faulkner spent much of World War II working for the Hawera Star in Taranaki. From 1944 to 1948, she and her husband leased the Dawson Falls Lodge, Egmont National Park, where she gained an appreciation for the flora and fauna and traditional lore of the region's national parks.

After gaining overseas experience as a journalist, Faulkner returned to write syndicated columns in four main-centre newspapers for ten years in the 1950s. Her "New Zealand Newsletters" found audiences in Britain, Canada, and South Africa from 1961 to 1985. She ran a "Behind the Headlines" commentary on current affairs on NZBC commercial network for 14 years, gave regular book reviews on the YA stations, and for 11 years was a regular panellist on Sunday Supplement.

She edited education programmes on the National parks of New Zealand and the legends of Lake Taupō and Mount Taranaki/Egmont, which are still available today, and in the 1970s produced a documentary series for Radio New Zealand that looked at the legend of the mountains and traditions surrounding them. She gave many workshops and courses on writing and journalism, and she inspired the creation of writers' groups at Stratford and New Plymouth. In 1971, she was named "New Zealand Woman of the Year".
