= Ian Payne (New Zealand cricketer) =

New Zealand cricketer (1921–2011)

Ian Wallace Payne (18 July 1921 – 16 May 2011) was a New Zealand cricketer who played for Otago in five Plunket Shield matches between the 1947–48 and 1951–52 seasons.

Payne was born at Dunedin in 1921. He played for Otago against Southland during the 1940–41 season, but did not make his first-class cricket debut until January 1948 after serving in the New Zealand Army during World War II. His representative debut came in a Plunket Shield match against Auckland at Carisbrook. An off break bowler and middle order batsman, Payne took a single wicket on debut and made scores of 23 not out and six runs in the match. Both of these remained the best performances of his career, and the wicket was the only one he took in senior representative cricket.

After playing against Canterbury later in the season, Payne did not play representative cricket again until the 1951–52 season, during which he played in three of Otago's four Shield matches. In total he scored 51 runs in his first-class career. He played club cricket for the Grange club in Dunedin.

Payne died in 2011 at Dunedin, and was buried at Andersons Bay Cemetery. He was aged 89.
