= Haimona Patete =

Haimona Patete (1863 – 25 June 1921) was a New Zealand Māori leader and religious founder. Of Māori descent, he identified with the Ngati Koata and Ngati Kuia iwi. He was born on D'Urville Island, Marlborough, New Zealand in about 1863. He founded a religion based in part upon the teachings of Paora Te Potangaroa.
