= Doris Palmer =

New Zealand activist, welfare worker (1898–1993)

Doris Adelaide Palmer QSM (née Canham; 21 August 1898 – 17 April 1993) was a New Zealand clerical worker, political activist and welfare worker.

Palmer was born in Auckland, New Zealand, in 1898. She was active in the Labour Party and both she and her husband were awarded life memberships. She founded the Rotorua branch of the National Council of Women.

In the 1985 Queen's Birthday Honours, Palmer was awarded the Queen's Service Medal for community service
