= Phyllis Williams =

New Zealand singer, horsewoman (1905–1993)

Phyllis Constance Williams (née Morris; 31 March 1905 – 26 July 1993) was a notable New Zealand singer and horsewoman. She was born in Gisborne, New Zealand, in 1905.
