= James Lytle (rugby union) =

Rugby union player from Northern Ireland

- Full name: James Hill Lytle
- Born: 18 May 1875 Belfast, Ireland
- Died: 11 July 1928 (aged 53) Buenos Aires, Argentina

Rugby union career
- Position: Forward
International career
| Years | Team | Apps | (Points) |
| 1894–99 | Ireland | 12 | (6) |

James Hill Lytle (18 May 1875 — 11 July 1928) was an Irish international rugby union player.

Lytle was a grandson of former Belfast mayor John Lytle and attended Merchiston Castle School in Scotland.

A strong scrummaging forward, Lytle played for Belfast club North of Ireland and was a noted goal-kicker, specialising in shots from distance. He made his Ireland debut playing beside his brother John during their triple crown-winning 1894 Home Nations campaign. Capped 12 times, Lytle finished his career with another triple crown win in 1899.

Lytle moved to Buenos Aires for business reasons around the turn of the century.

== See also ==
- List of Ireland national rugby union players
