= Samuel Horatio Moreton =

New Zealand painter, signwriter, artist, and explorer

Samuel Horatio Moreton (1843–21 March 1921) was a New Zealand painter, signwriter, artist, and explorer. He was born in London, England in about 1843.
