= Tom Marshall (Bible teacher) =

New Zealand author and teacher (1921–1993)

Tom Marshall (October 9, 1921 – October 1, 1993) was an international Bible teacher who authored a number of books on counselling and healing, best known for his work entitled Understanding Leadership.

Marshall was born in Ayrshire, Scotland. His parents emigrated to New Zealand in 1925, settling in Moera, near Petone, Wellington. He was educated at Randwick School (Moera) and Hutt Valley High School. After serving as a navigator in the Fleet Air Arm during World War II, he married Jenny Burne-Jones in Bellshill, Glasgow in 1945 and they settled in Wellington. Marshall graduated with a Bachelor of Commerce degree from Victoria University of Wellington. He worked initially in the New Zealand Treasury and later in advertising, magazine publishing, teaching and management consultancy.

Marshall and his wife were foundation members of the Wainuiomata Baptist Church. In the early 1960s he became involved in the Charismatic Renewal movement in New Zealand and left the Baptist church to form a house church. He was subsequently invited to speak at both charismatic and mainstream Christian churches in New Zealand. He was a speaker at the August 1964 Conference held on Massey University's campus in Palmerston North, which was a landmark conference for the beginning of the Charismatic movement in New Zealand. It was the first significant gathering of Charismatics in New Zealand, and revealed that the movement was beginning to grow. In the 1970s he moved to the Kāpiti Coast north of Wellington and was instrumental in forming the Kapiti Christian Centre. He was the founding editor of The Shaker magazine (later renamed Today's Christian). In the 1980s he spoke at many overseas conventions and was involved in the ministry of Youth with a Mission.

His book Understanding Leadership (1991) is essentially concerned with servant leadership as defined by Robert Greenleaf. It describes how and why leadership is distinct from management, administration or ministry and offers perspectives on topics such as foresight, trust, criticism, caring, status, timing, failure and honour. Understanding Leadership is published by Sovereign World Ltd. Understanding Leadership is published in the U.S. by Northwestern Publishing House. A 2003 edition is published by Baker Books.

== Selected works ==
- Explaining defensive spiritual warfare. Tonbridge : Sovereign World, c1996. ISBN 1-85240-156-7 (pbk)
- Explaining binding and loosing. Chichester : Sovereign World, 1991 ISBN 1-85240-074-9 (pbk)
- Explaining honour and respect. Chichester : Sovereign World, c1991 ISBN 1-85240-063-3 (pbk)
- Explaining principalities and powers. Tonbridge : Sovereign World, 1992. ISBN 1-85240-087-0 (pbk)
- Explaining trust. Chichester : Sovereign World, c1992. ISBN 1-85240-078-1 (pbk)
- Foundations for a healing ministry. Chichester : Sovereign World, 1988. ISBN 1-85240-025-0
- Free indeed! Sovereign World, c1983. ISBN 1-85240-002-1
- Healing from the inside out: Understanding God's touch for spirit soul and body. Sovereign World, c1988 ISBN 1-85240-025-0
- Right relationships: A Biblical foundation for making and mending relationships. Chichester : Sovereign World, 1989 ISBN 1-85240-034-X
- Understanding leadership: Fresh perspectives on the essentials of New Testament leadership. Sovereign World, c1991 ISBN 1-85240-053-6 (pbk)

Source: COPAC

== Periodicals ==
The Shaker. The Salt Company, Paraparaumu, New Zealand Vol. 1, no. 1: Sept./Oct. 1982–1988

Today's Christian. Paraparaumu Beach, New Zealand. No. 1 May/June 1988 – no. 31: Aug./Sept. 1993. ISSN 0113-8707

Source: National Library of New Zealand

== See also ==
- Binding and loosing
- Spiritual warfare
