= Patricia Charlotte Perrin =

New Zealand potter (1921–1988)

Patricia Perrin
- Born: Patricia Charlotte Perrin; 11 July 1921; Auckland, New Zealand
- Died: 12 November 1988 (aged 67); Auckland, New Zealand
- Known for: Pottery

Patricia Charlotte Perrin (11 July 1921 – 12 November 1988) was a New Zealand potter. She was born in Auckland, New Zealand on 11 July 1921 and died at Auckland Hospital on 12 November 1988.

Perrin began to learn pottery by taking night classes at Avondale College, and was taught by Robert Field. Within three years Perrin was herself teaching at Avondale College.

Her works are held in the collection of the Auckland Art Gallery Toi o Tāmaki and the Museum of New Zealand Te Papa Tongarewa.

Perrin exhibited with:

- Auckland Society of Arts
- New Zealand Academy of Fine Arts
- The Group in 1951

== Further information ==
Artist files for Patricia Perrin are held at:

- Robert and Barbara Stewart Library and Archives, Christchurch Art Gallery Te Puna o Waiwhetu
- Fine Arts Library, University of Auckland
- Hocken Collections Uare Taoka o Hākena
- Te Aka Matua Research Library, Museum of New Zealand Te Papa Tongarewa

Also see:

- Peter Cape, Artists and Craftsmen in New Zealand, Auckland, London: Collins, 1969
- Douglas Lloyd Jenkins, Patricia Perrin: New Zealand potter, Auckland: Corban Estate Arts Centre, 2005. ISBN 0473105179
