= James Little (shepherd) =

New Zealand shepherd

James Little (22 October 1834 – 31 October 1921) was a New Zealand shepherd and sheep breeder. He was born in Powbeat, Midlothian, Scotland on 22 October 1834.
