= Aston Greathead =

New Zealand artist (1921–2012)

- Born: Aston Wyatt Greathead; May 31, 1921; Napier, New Zealand
- Died: July 18, 2012 (aged 91); Blenheim, New Zealand
- Known for: Painting

Aston Wyatt Greathead (31 May 1921 – 18 July 2012) was a New Zealand artist. He was born in Napier, the second of the five children of William John Edwin Greathead and Jane Greathead (née Wyatt), but the family soon moved to Timaru. Aston Greathead attended Waimataitai Primary School, where his drawings on the covers and page margins of his textbooks were sought after by fellow pupils at the school's annual book sales. He never received art lessons, but was completely self-taught, developing his own natural talent from an early age. At one early art competition, the judges did not believe the work he submitted was his own, so he was locked in a room with a pencil and paper only to produce a work that amazed the judges.

Greathead did not attend secondary school, instead going directly into employment at S.W. Lewis and Sons in Timaru where he learnt signwriting.

During the Second World War, Greathead served five years in the New Zealand Army in the North African and Italian campaigns. His art was in demand by fellow soldiers who wanted to send home pictures.

He returned to New Zealand after the war, setting up his own signwriting business in Christchurch, but while the business flourished, the stress became too much and he was advised to give it up. He then sold up in 1960 and relocated his family (wife Ethel ('Ett') (née Taberner) and their three daughters – Suzanne Jean, Wendy Wilks and Dennise Kay) to their bach at Kaikōura. With only one motel in that town at the time, he assisted a builder to construct five cabins, Bayside Cabins, along with their new house.

For three years or so, the family lived on savings, the income from the cabins, plus the occasional sale of a painting. By the fourth year, art sales picked up, and his prospects brightened.

In 1966 he won Sir Henry Kelliher's Dawson Hallmark watercolour award, which propelled him to fame and brought him commissions. Many of the early commissions came from remote farms, and he was happiest when painting on location. His favourite medium was watercolours, but over time he used this less, in favour of acrylics, which he preferred to straight oils. His technique, derived from his signwriting days, often used only four colours, and the colour of the canvas, which allowed him to paint relatively fast, often finishing a painting in a matter of hours.

Aoraki / Mount Cook was a favourite subject for him, and the lounge bar and dining room at Hermitage Hotel, Mount Cook Village, still display his works.

By the 1990s Greathead was also making his own sculptured frames for his works, adding a 'third dimension' to the painting itself.

He also donated works to charity: 1000 limited edition prints of his "Keas at dusk" were donated to the Cancer Society in the 1980s, raising $200,000. In September 2008 he donated two paintings to an auction to raise money to upgrade the children's section of the Temuka cemetery.

Greathead retired to Blenheim in 1994, where he died 18 years later, survived by his three daughters, 10 grandchildren and 11 great-grandchildren.
