= 1919 in New Zealand =

- Decades: 1890s; 1900s; 1910s; 1920s; 1930s
- See also: History of New Zealand; List of years in New Zealand; Timeline of New Zealand history

The following lists events that happened during 1919 in New Zealand.

== Incumbents ==
=== Regal and viceregal ===
- Head of State – George V
- Governor-General – Arthur Foljambe, 2nd Earl of Liverpool
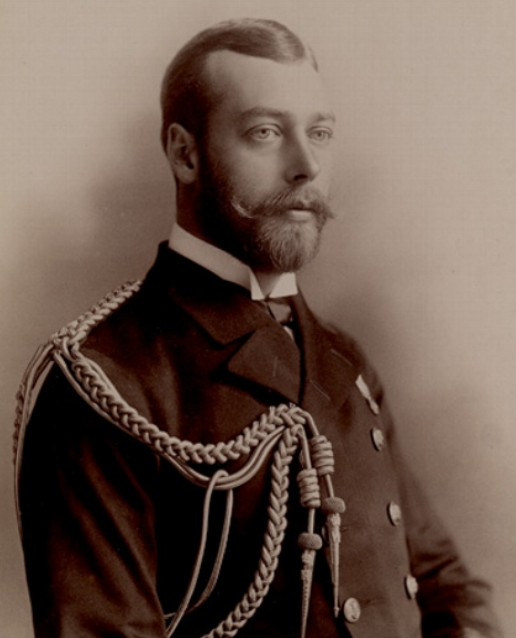
George V

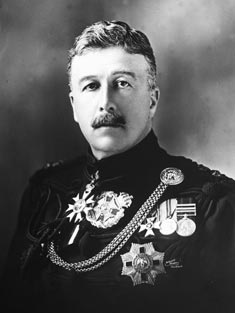
Lord Liverpool

=== Government ===
The 19th New Zealand Parliament concludes. The election held in November sees the Reform Party returned with an increased majority (47 of the 80 seats). Women are eligible to stand for Parliament for the first time.

- Speaker of the House – Frederic Lang (Reform Party)
- Prime Minister – William Massey (Reform Party)
- Minister of Finance – Joseph Ward until 21 August, then James Allen
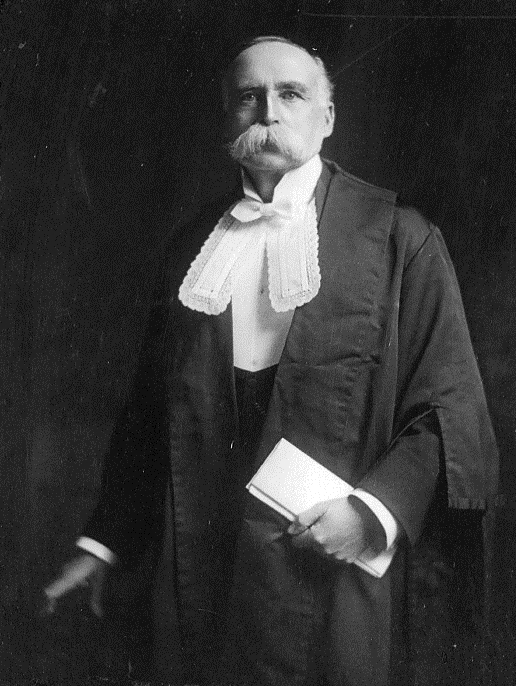
Frederic Lang

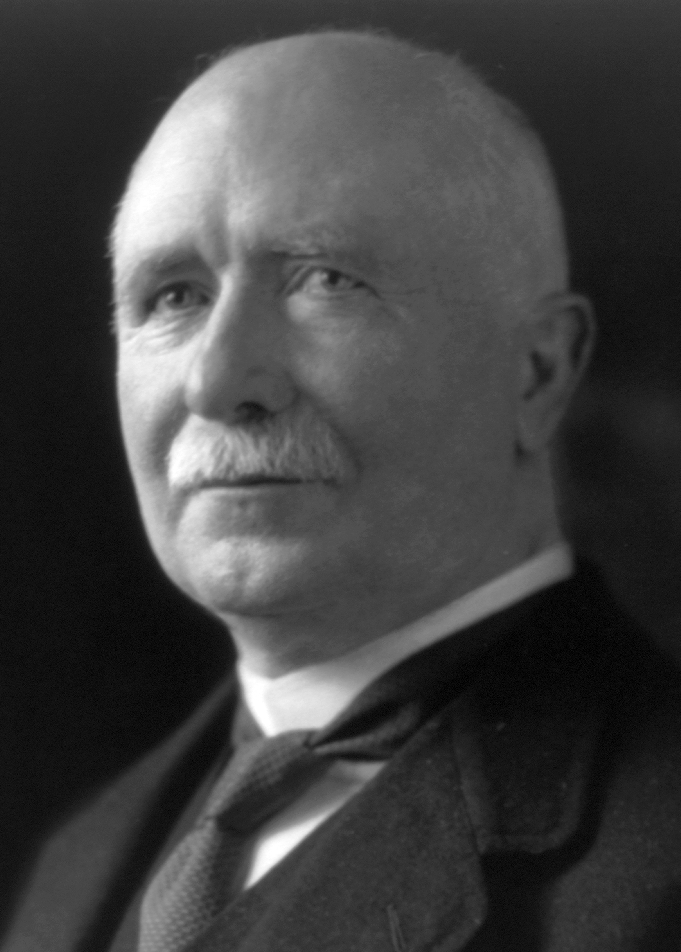
William Massey

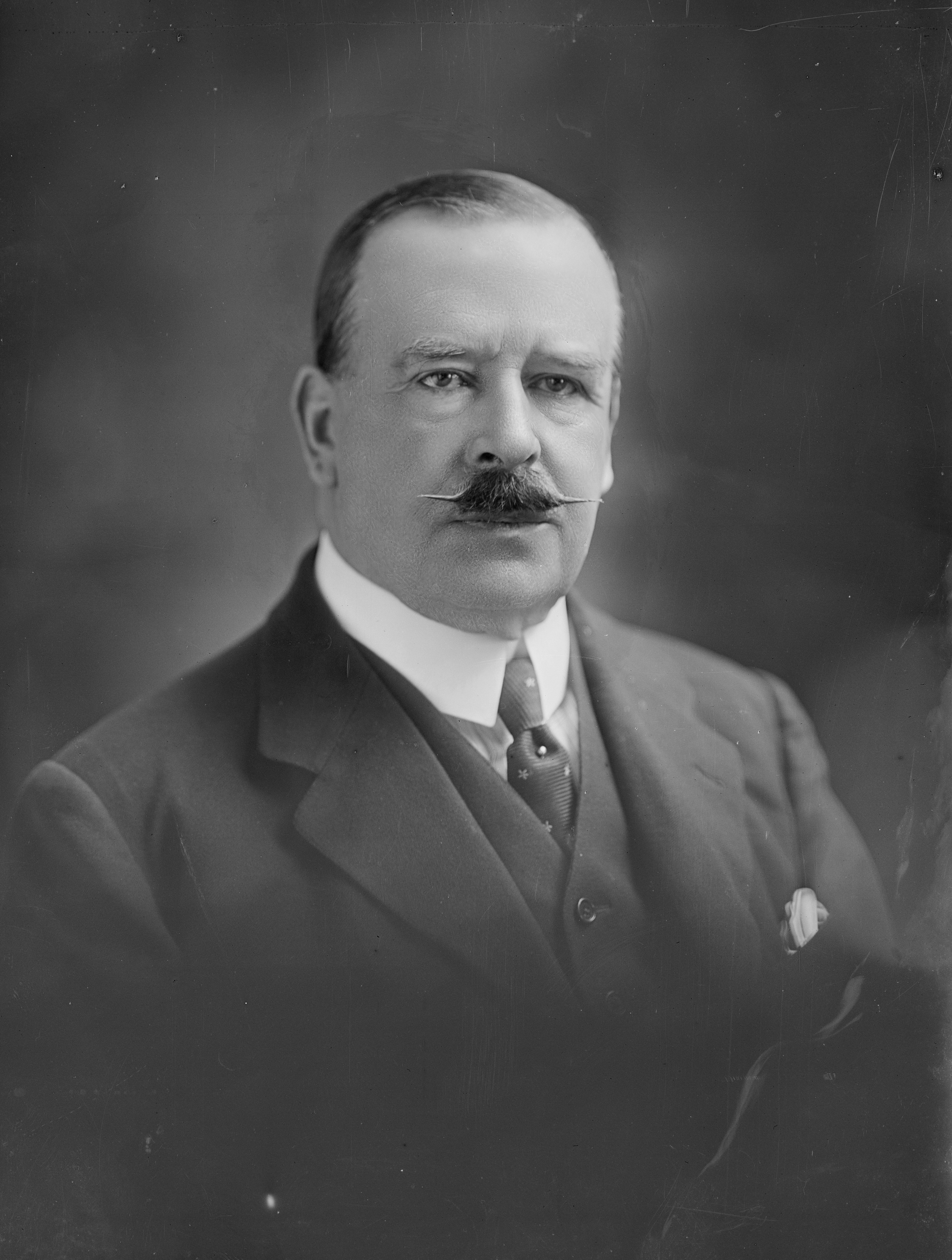
Joseph Ward

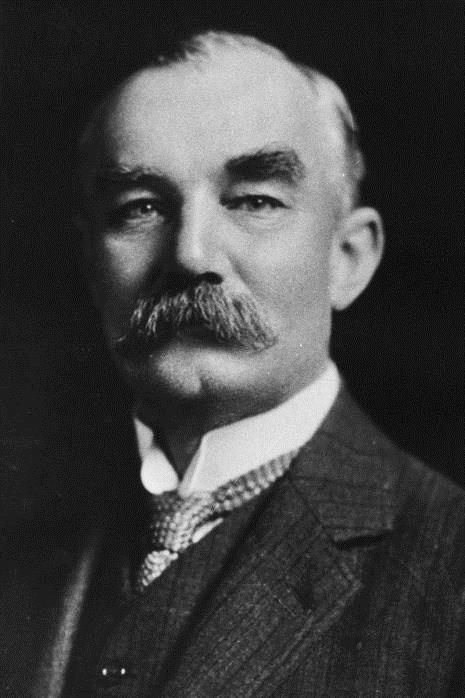
James Allen

=== Parliamentary opposition ===
- Leader of the Opposition – Joseph Ward (Liberal Party).
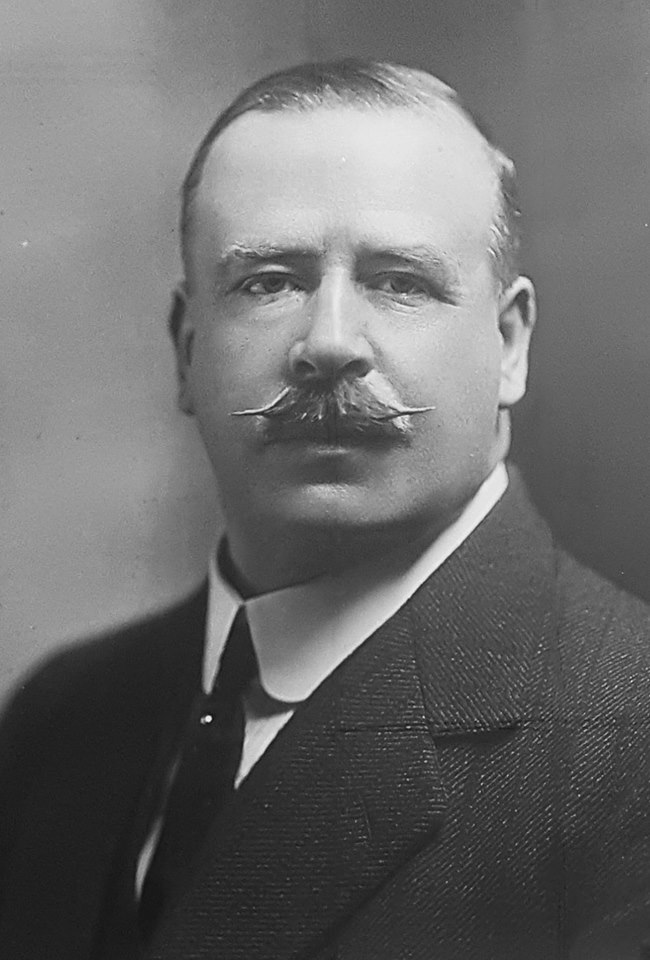
Joseph Ward

=== Judiciary ===
- Chief Justice – Sir Robert Stout
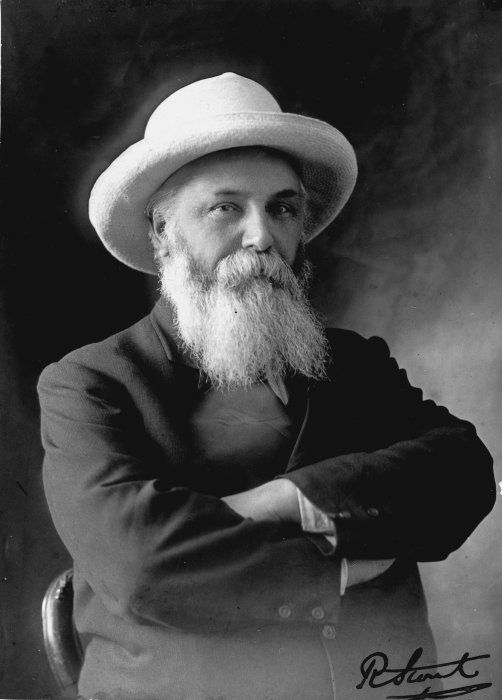
Robert Stout

=== Main centre leaders ===
- Mayor of Auckland – James Gunson
- Mayor of Wellington – John Luke
- Mayor of Christchurch – Henry Holland then Henry Thacker
- Mayor of Dunedin – James Clark then William Begg
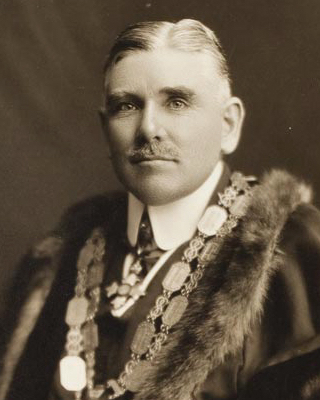
James Gunson

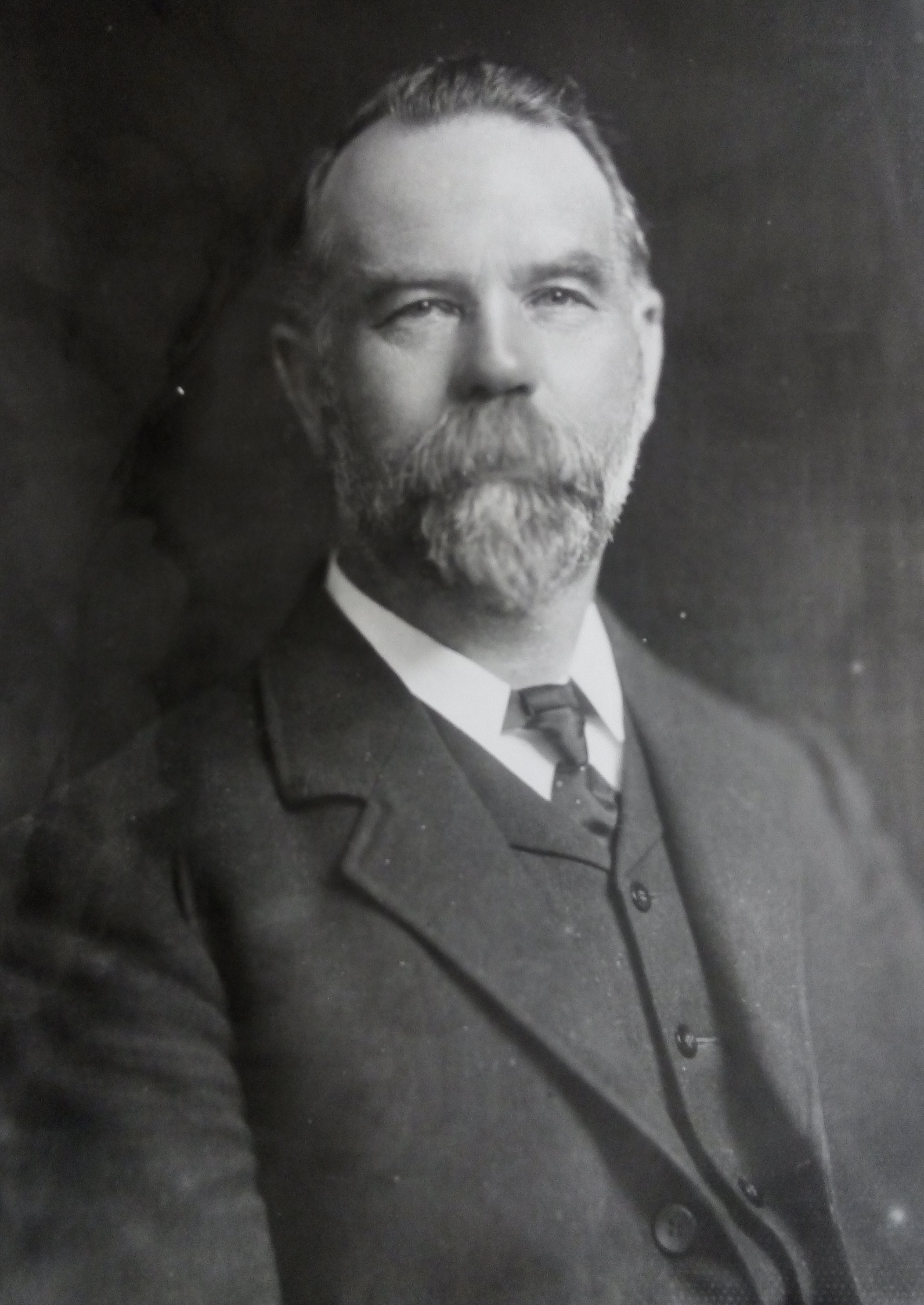
John Luke

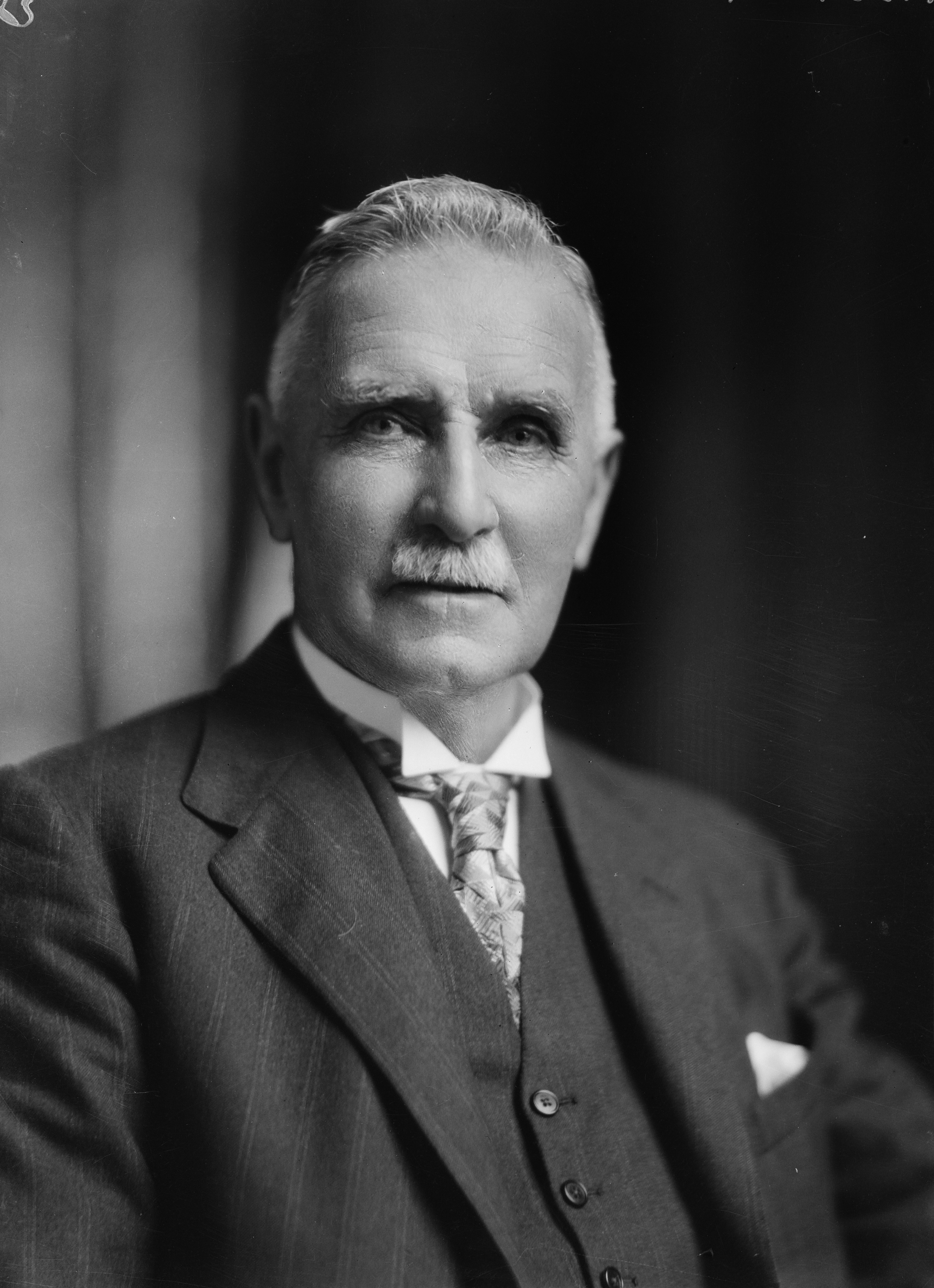
Henry Holland

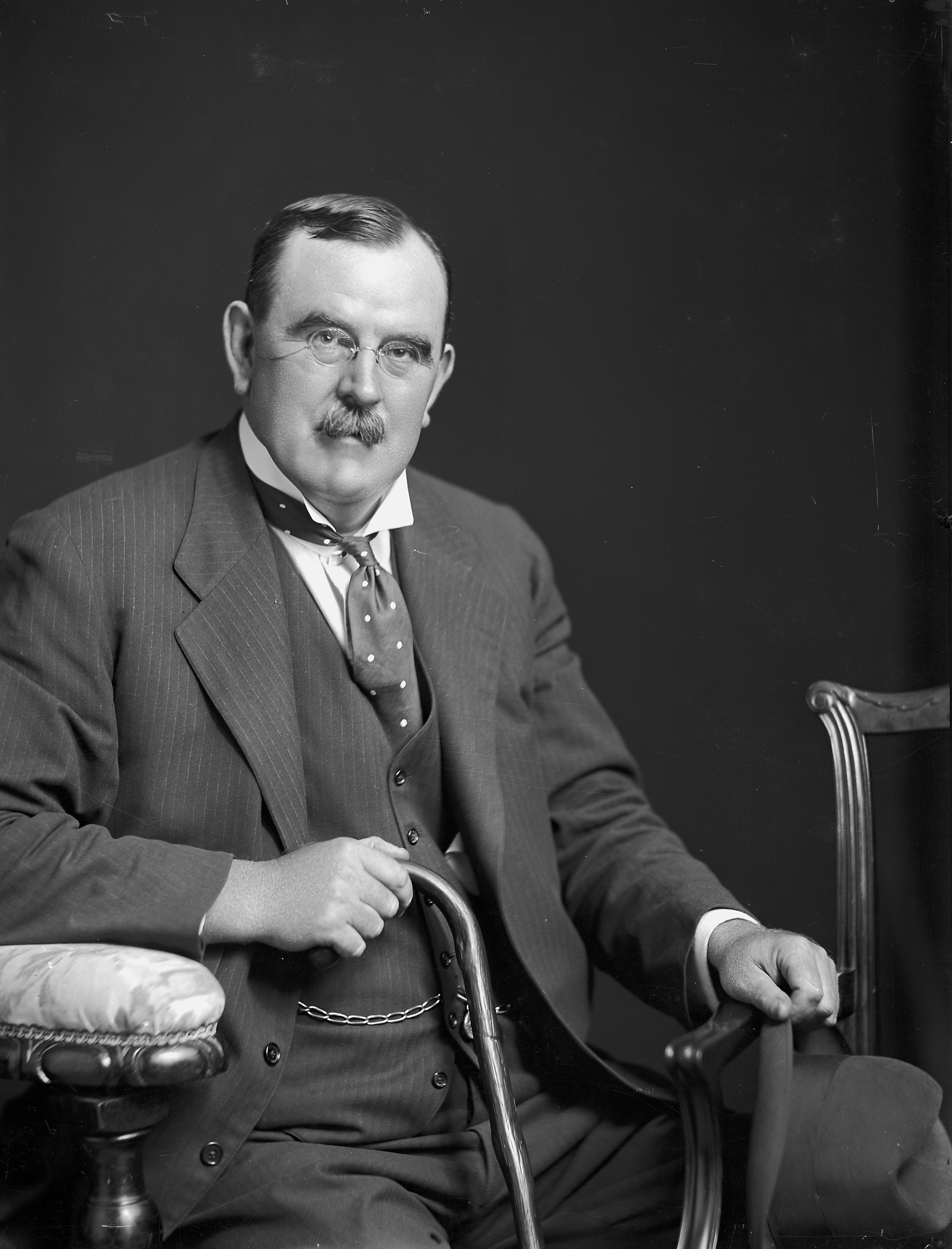
Henry Thacker

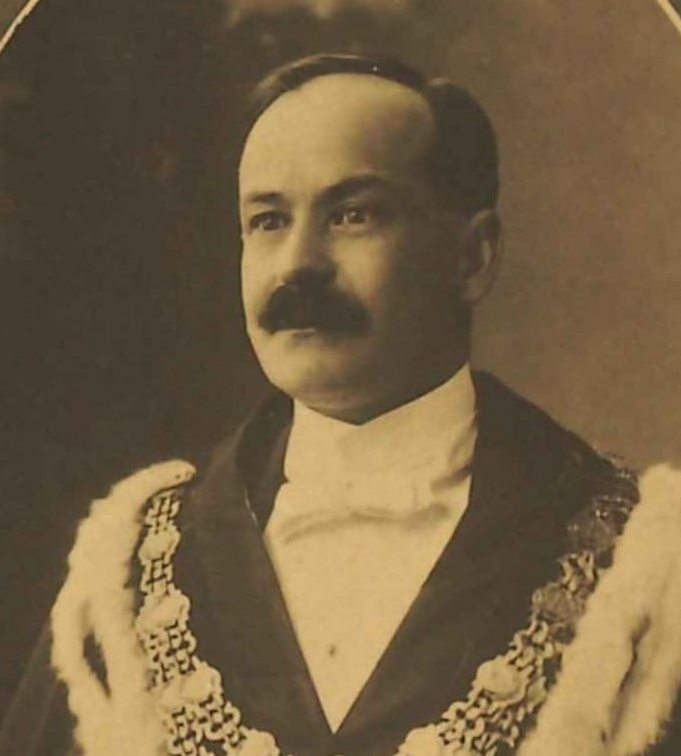
James Clark

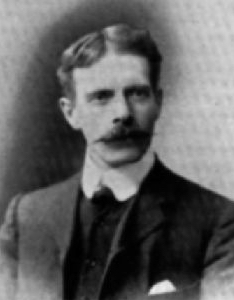
William Begg

== Events ==
- January – George Bolt ascends to a record height of 6,500 feet (2,000 m).
- 1 February – Cecil McKenzie Hill, chief instructor for the Canterbury Aviation Company, is killed in an air accident while flying over Riccarton Racecourse. This is the first aircraft fatality in New Zealand.
- 4 February – New Zealand Rifle Brigade (Earl of Liverpool's Own) disbanded.
- 31 May – George Bolt flies from Auckland to Russell in a Boeing and Westervelt floatplane. The distance of 233 kilometres (145 mi) is a record for a flight in New Zealand.
- 16 December – George Bolt makes the first experimental airmail flight in New Zealand. He flies from Auckland to Dargaville and back again on the same day, a total distance of approximately 320 kilometres (200 mi).
- 16–17 December – The 1919 general election is held.
- December – The Ministry of External Affairs is established, with James Allen as the first minister.

== Arts and literature ==
See 1919 in art, 1919 in literature, Category:1919 books

=== Music ===
See: 1919 in music

=== Film ===
See: Category:1919 film awards, 1919 in film, List of New Zealand feature films, Cinema of New Zealand, Category:1919 films

== Sport ==
- See: 1919 in sports, Category:1919 in sports

=== Chess ===
- The National Chess championship was not held (the influenza epidemic was still subsiding at its traditional new year dates).

=== Cricket ===
- Plunket Shield: 25–29 December, Hagley Oval, Christchurch: Canterbury defeated Wellington by 7 wickets. See 1920 in New Zealand#Cricket for remaining matches in this Plunket Shield competition.

=== Football ===
- Provincial league champions:
  - Auckland – North Shore
  - Canterbury – Linwood, Excelsior (shared)
  - Hawke's Bay – Waipukurau
  - Otago – Northern
  - Southland – No competition
  - Wanganui – Eastbrooke
  - Wellington – YMCA

=== Golf ===
- The ninth New Zealand Open championship is won by Ted Douglas (his third victory) after a playoff against Sloan Morpeth.
- The 23rd National Amateur Championships are held in Napier
  - Men – H. E. Crosse (Napier) (second title)
  - Women – Noeline Wright (Timaru)

=== Horse racing ===
==== Harness racing ====
- New Zealand Trotting Cup – Trix Pointer
- Auckland Trotting Cup – Creina

==== Thoroughbred racing ====
- New Zealand Cup – Vagabond
- Auckland Cup – Karo
- Wellington Cup – Red Ribbon / Rewi Poto (dead heat)
- New Zealand Derby – Rossini

=== Lawn bowls ===
The national outdoor lawn bowls championships are held in Auckland.

- Men's singles champion – M. Walker (Ponsonby Bowling Club)
- Men's pair champions – J.B. Rosmon, W.J. Hueston (skip) (Gisborne Bowling Club)
- Men's fours champions – A.J. Andrew, W. Given, O. Gallagher, Ernie Jury (skip) (Karangahake Bowling Club)

=== Rugby union ===
- Wellington defend the Ranfurly Shield against six challengers; Canterbury (21–8), Taranaki (18–10), Canterbury (in Christchurch) (23–9), Auckland (24–3), and Wanganui (30–3).

=== Rugby league ===
- New Zealand national rugby league team

== Births ==
=== January–February ===
- 4 January – Joseph Collins, boxer
- 21 January – Eddie Robertson, geophysicist and scientific administrator
- 23 January – Dorothy Winstone, educationalist and academic
- 26 January
  - Les Gandar, politician
  - Hepi Te Heuheu, Ngāti Tūwharetoa leader
- 4 February – Sam Cusack, community character
- 5 February – William R. Newland, potter
- 10 February – Dorothy Freed, author, composer, music historian
- 12 February – Bob Miller, surveyor, Antarctic explorer, conservationist
- 25 February – Jack Tizard, psychologist

=== March–April ===
- 3 March – Henry Lang, public servant, economist
- 6 March – Jim Knox, trade union leader
- 7 March – John Wyatt, cricketer
- 29 March – Lorrie Pickering, politician
- 30 March – Robin Williams, mathematical physicist, university administrator, public servant
- 5 April – Les Munro, World War II bomber pilot
- 14 April – Lester Harvey, rugby union player
- 16 April – Jan Nigro, artist
- 29 April – Jack Ridley, civil engineer, politician

=== May–June ===
- 10 May – Eric Godley, botanist, academic biographer
- 16 May – Frank Callaway, music academic and administrator
- 19 May – Peter Hooper, writer, conservationist
- 28 May – Alex Lindsay, violinist, orchestral conductor and leader
- 1 June – Michael Miles, television presenter
- 2 June – Bert Walker, politician
- 4 June – Alister McLellan, mathematician, physicist
- 8 June – Guy Overton, cricketer
- 13 June – Phyl Blackler, cricketer
- 14 June – James Ward, World War II bomber pilot, Victoria Cross recipient
- 15 June – Doug Harris, athlete
- 16 June – Ces Mountford, rugby league player and coach
- 28 June – Charles Willocks, rugby union player

=== July–August ===
- 6 July – Ray Dowker, cricketer, association footballer
- 14 July – Ray Dalton, rugby union player
- 17 July – Alex Moir, cricketer
- 20 July – Edmund Hillary, mountaineer, explorer, philanthropist
- 22 July – Angus Tait, electronics innovator and businessman
- 1 August – Colin McCahon, artist
- 3 August – David Aubrey Scott, diplomat
- 8 August – Hōri Mahue Ngata, lexicographer
- 10 August – Murray Beresford Roberts, confidence trickster
- 22 August – Dick Brittenden, sports journalist
- 24 August – Colin Aikman, public servant, lawyer, diplomat, academic

=== September–October ===
- 5 September – John Rangihau, academic, Māori leader
- 24 September – Gordon Walters, artist, graphic designer
- 25 September – Tony George, weightlifter
- 29 September – Ruth Dallas, poet, children's author
- 30 September – John Stacpoole, architect, historian
- 7 October – James Boyer Brown, endocrinologist
- 8 October – Mac Anderson, cricketer, air force officer
- 11 October – John Warham, photographer, ornithologist
- 20 October – John Karlsen, actor
- 25 October
  - George Burns, rower
  - George Cawkwell, classical scholar

=== November–December ===
- 6 November – Allen Lissette, cricketer
- 7 November – Levi Borgstrom, carver
- 9 November – Janet Paul, publisher, painter, art historian
- 11 November – Lance Adams-Schneider, politician, diplomat
- 25 November – Keith Lawrence, World War II pilot
- 6 December – Cedric Hassall, chemist, academic
- 10 December – Walter Robinson, Anglican bishop
- 11 December – Lady Anne Berry, horticulturalist
- 12 December – Ida Gaskin, school teacher, quiz show contestant, politician
- 17 December – Rei Hamon, artist
- 20 December – Bubbles Mihinui, tourist guide, community leader
- 21 December – Jack Williams, politician
- 28 December – Jack Clarke, athlete
- 29 December – Thomas Horton, air force pilot

== Deaths ==
=== January–March ===
- 21 January – Thomas Thompson, politician (born 1832)
- 22 January – Carrick Paul, World War I flying ace (born 1893)
- 2 February – Charles Begg, surgeon, army health administrator (born 1879)
- 7 February – Donald Reid, farmer, landowner, businessman, politician (born 1833)
- 13 February – William Temple, soldier, Victoria Cross recipient (born 1833)
- 18 February – Searby Buxton, politician (born 1832)
- 19 February – William Tucker, soldier, farmer, politician, mayor of Gisborne (1887–88) (born 1843)
- 24 February – Alfred Fraser, politician (born 1862)
- 18 March – Isabella Siteman, farmer, philanthropist (born c.1842)
- 25 March – Harry Burnand, engineer, sawmiller (born 1850)

=== April–June ===
- 3 April
  - Charlie Frith, cricket player and umpire (born 1854)
  - Mary Hames, farmer, dressmaker (born 1827)
- 23 April – Archie McMinn, rugby union player (born 1880)
- 24 April – William Speight, politician (born 1843)
- 6 May – Catherine Fulton, diarist, philanthropist, social reformer, suffragette (born 1829)
- 28 May – Edward Bartley, architect (born 1839)
- 1 June – Thomas William Adams, farmer, forester, educationalist (born 1842)
- 4 June – John Sharp, politician, mayor of Nelson (1887–90) (born 1828)
- 25 June – Hamilton Gilmer, politician (born 1838)
- 29 June – James McKerrow, astronomer, surveyor, public servant (born 1834)

=== July–September ===
- 22 July – Sir John Denniston, lawyer, jurist (born 1845)
- 3 August – Stuart Newall, military leader (born 1843)
- 6 August – James Dawe, cricketer (born 1844)
- 13 August – Jackson Palmer, politician (born 1867)
- 24 August – Thomas Broun, entomologist (born 1838)
- 26 August – Richard Molesworth Taylor, politician (born 1835)
- 4 September – Joseph Ivess, politician (born 1844)

=== October–December ===
- 13 October – James Stack, missionary, writer, interpreter (born 1835)
- 21 October – Alexander McMinn, teacher, journalist, newspaper proprietor (born 1842)
- 29 October – James Colvin, politician (born 1844)
- 3 November – Ellen Dougherty, nurse (born 1844)
- 15 November – Maria Marchant, school principal (born 1869)
- 24 November – George Randall Johnson, cricketer, politician (born 1833)
- 11 December – Takaanui Hōhaia Tarakawa, Tapuika, Ngāti Rangiwewehi and Ngāi Te Rangi tohunga, historian and genealogist (born 1852)
- 15 December – Louisa Snelson, civic leader (born 1844)
- 18 December – Frederick Strouts, architect (born 1834)
- 29 December – Wiremu Hoani Taua, Ngāti Kahu leader, school principal (born 1862)

== See also ==
- History of New Zealand
- List of years in New Zealand
- Military history of New Zealand
- Timeline of New Zealand history
- Timeline of New Zealand's links with Antarctica
- Timeline of the New Zealand environment
