= 1920 in New Zealand =

- Decades: 1900s; 1910s; 1920s; 1930s; 1940s
- See also: History of New Zealand; List of years in New Zealand; Timeline of New Zealand history

The following lists events that happened during 1920 in New Zealand.

== Incumbents ==
=== Regal and viceregal ===
- Head of State – George V
- Governor-General – Arthur Foljambe, 2nd Earl of Liverpool until 7 July, then John Jellicoe, Viscount Jellicoe from 27 September
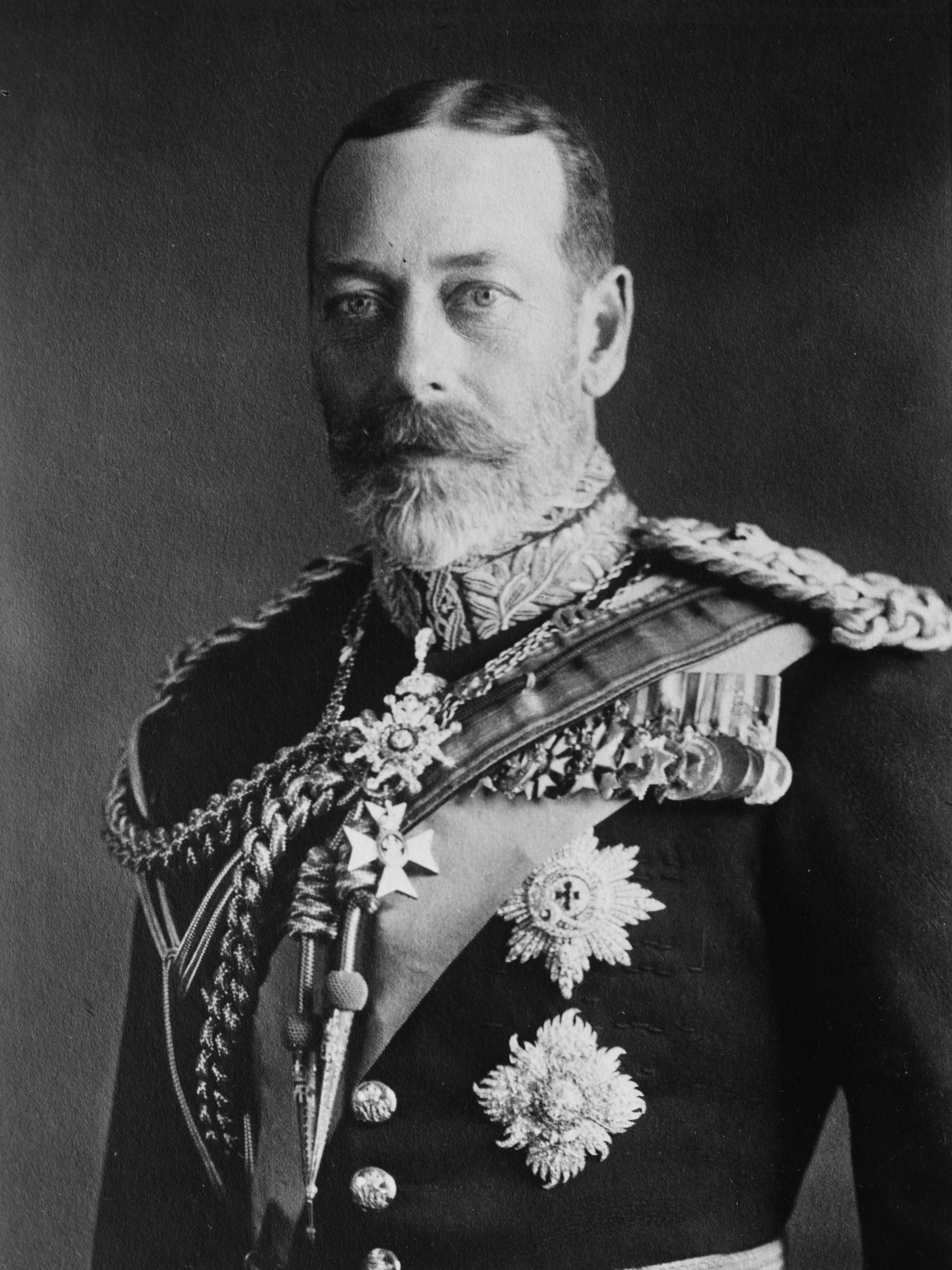
George V

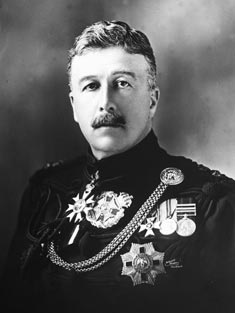
Lord Liverpool

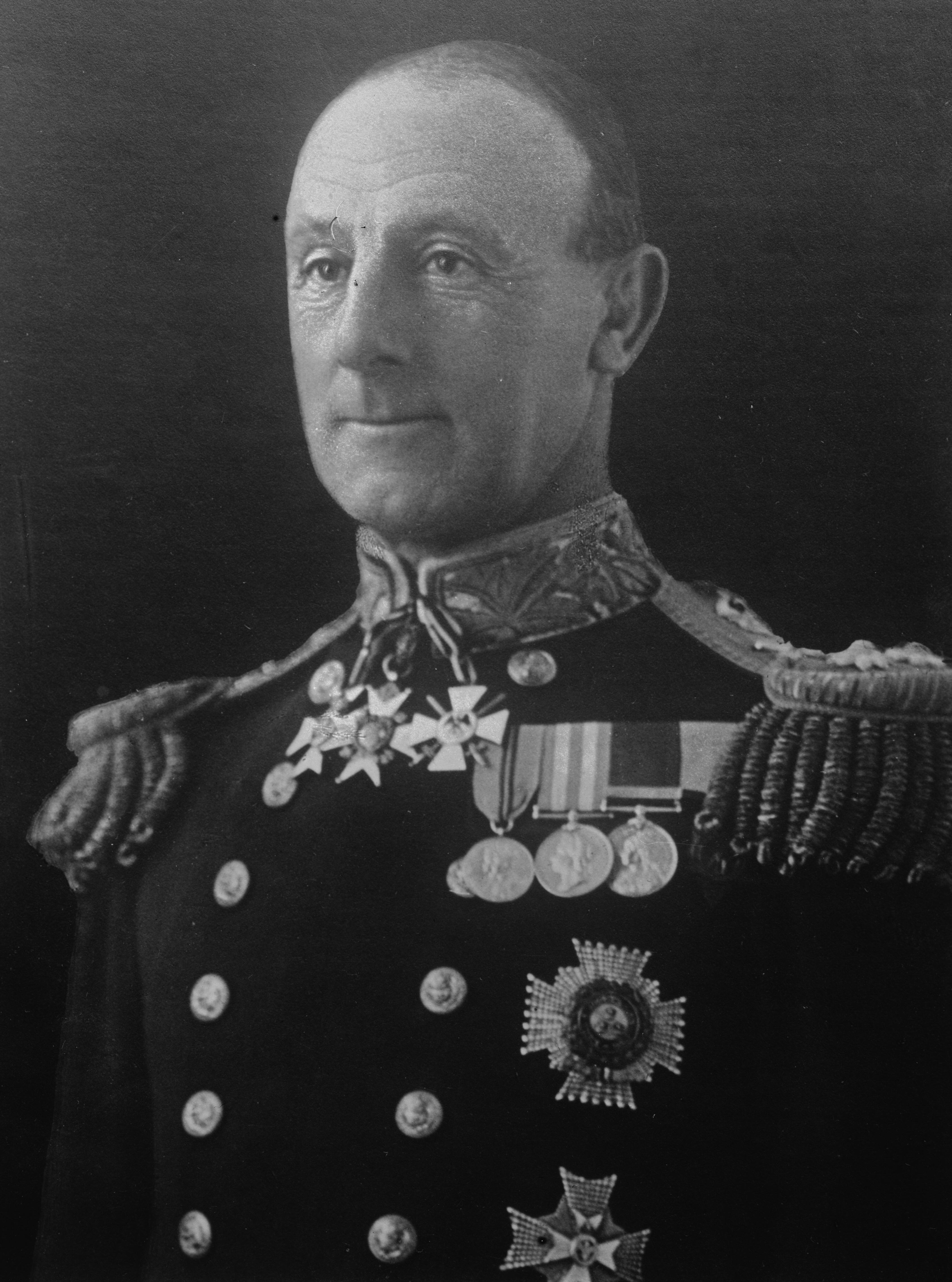
Viscount Jellicoe

=== Government ===
The 20th New Zealand Parliament commences, with the Reform Party in Government

- Speaker of the House – Frederic Lang (Reform Party)
- Prime Minister – William Massey
- Minister of Finance – James Allen until 28 April, then William Massey from 12 May
- Minister of External Affairs – James Allen until 28 April, then Ernest Lee from 17 May
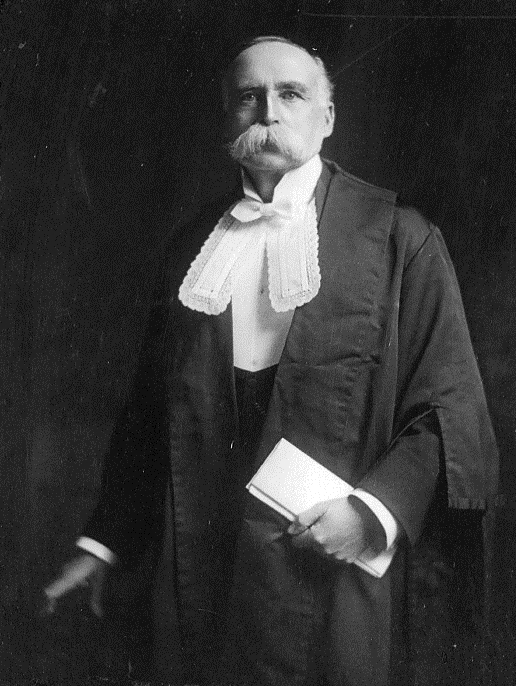
Frederic Lang

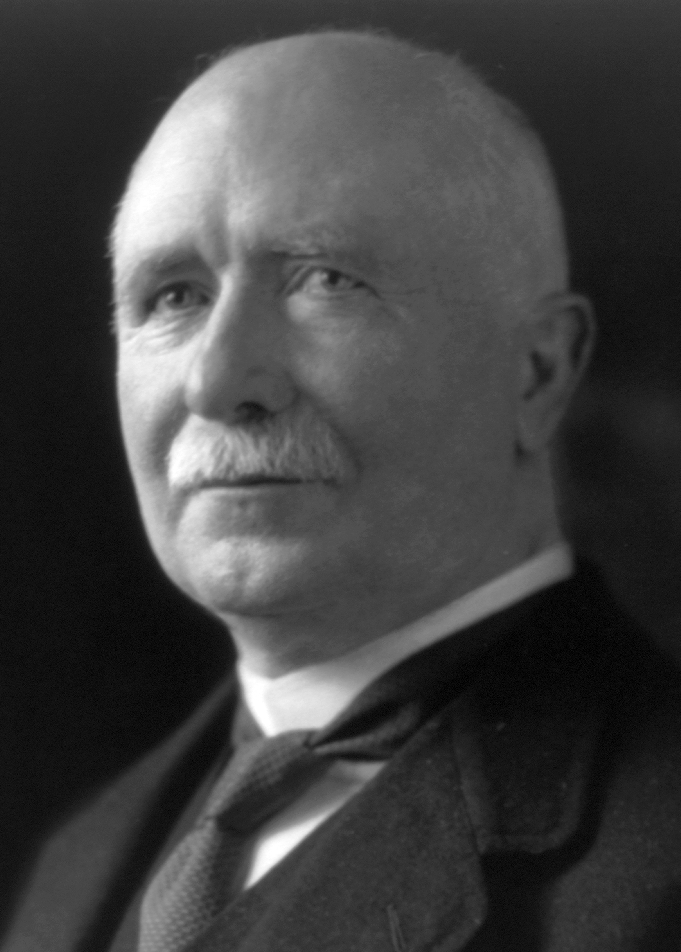
William Massey

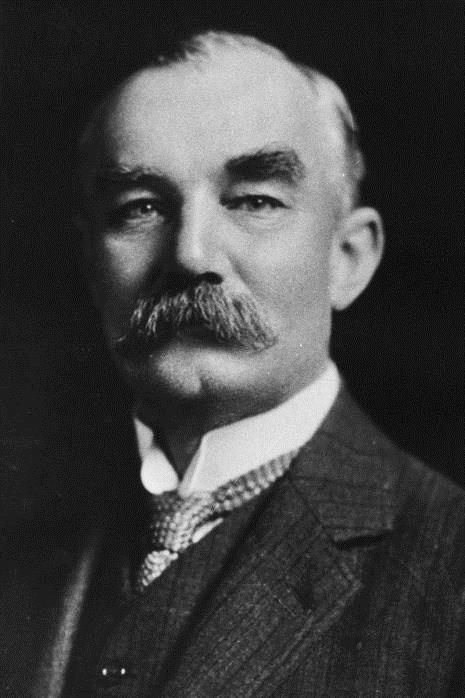
James Allen

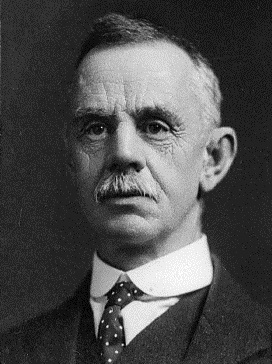
Ernest Lee

=== Parliamentary opposition ===
- Leader of the Opposition – William MacDonald (Liberal Party) until his death on 31 August, then Thomas Wilford
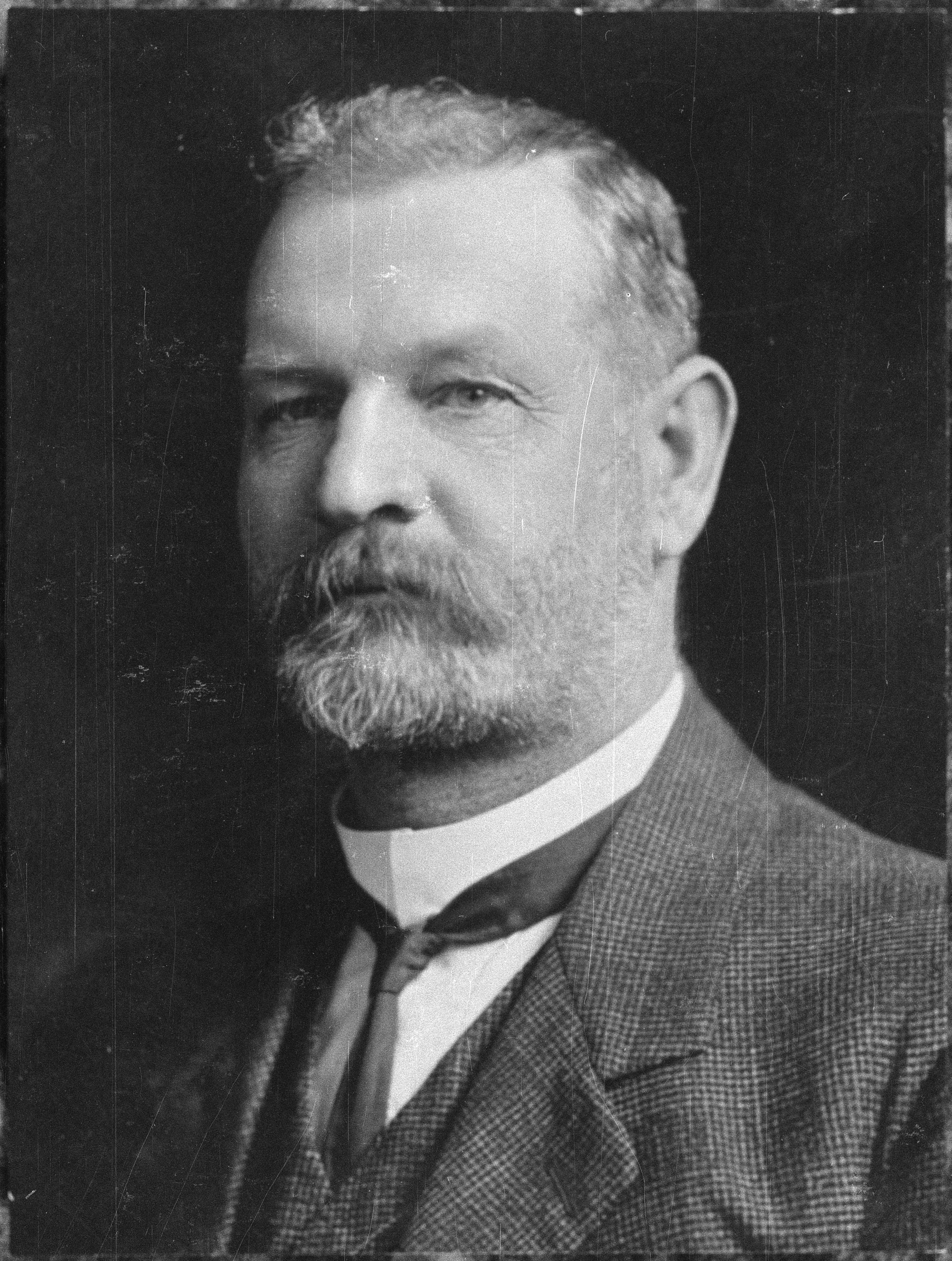
William MacDonald

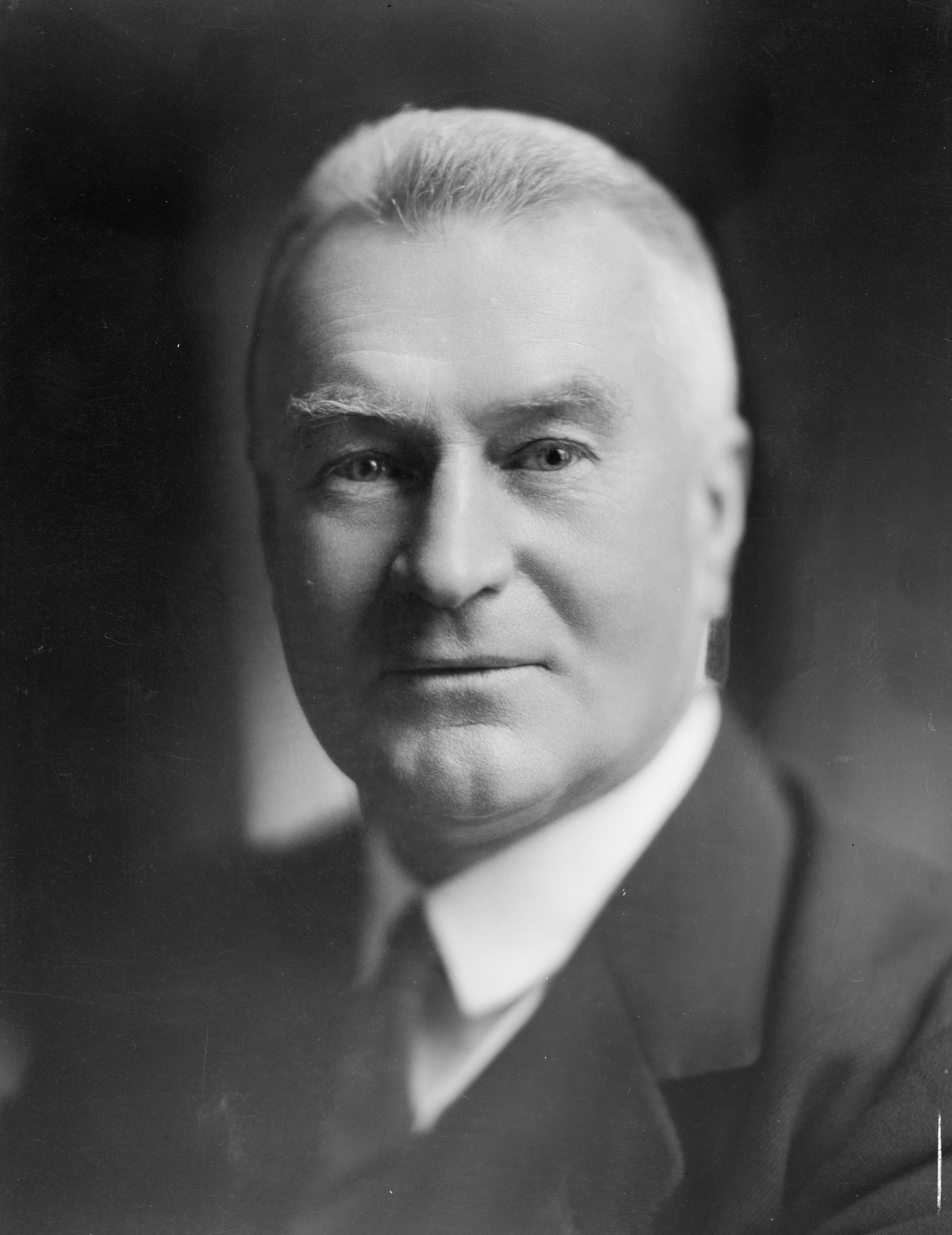
Thomas Wilford

=== Judiciary ===
- Chief Justice – Sir Robert Stout
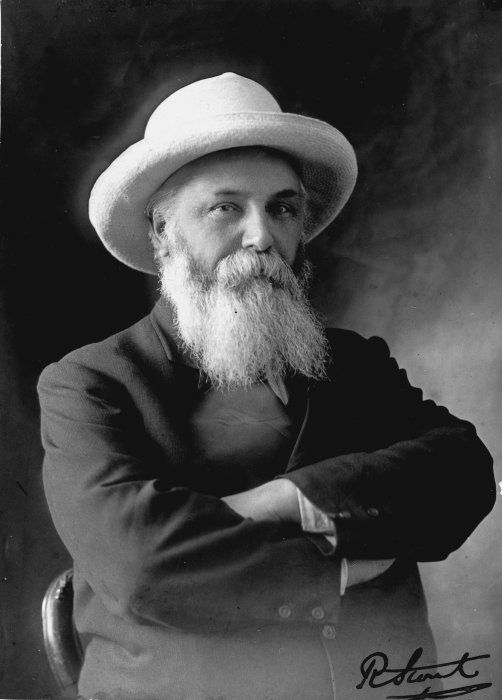
Robert Stout

=== Main centre leaders ===
- Mayor of Auckland – James Gunson
- Mayor of Wellington – John Luke
- Mayor of Christchurch – Henry Thacker
- Mayor of Dunedin – William Begg
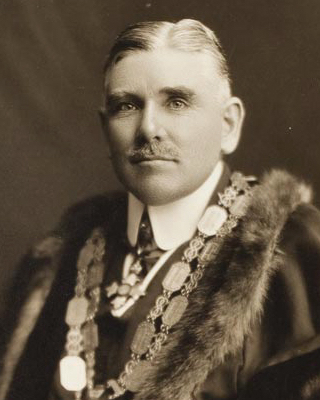
James Gunson

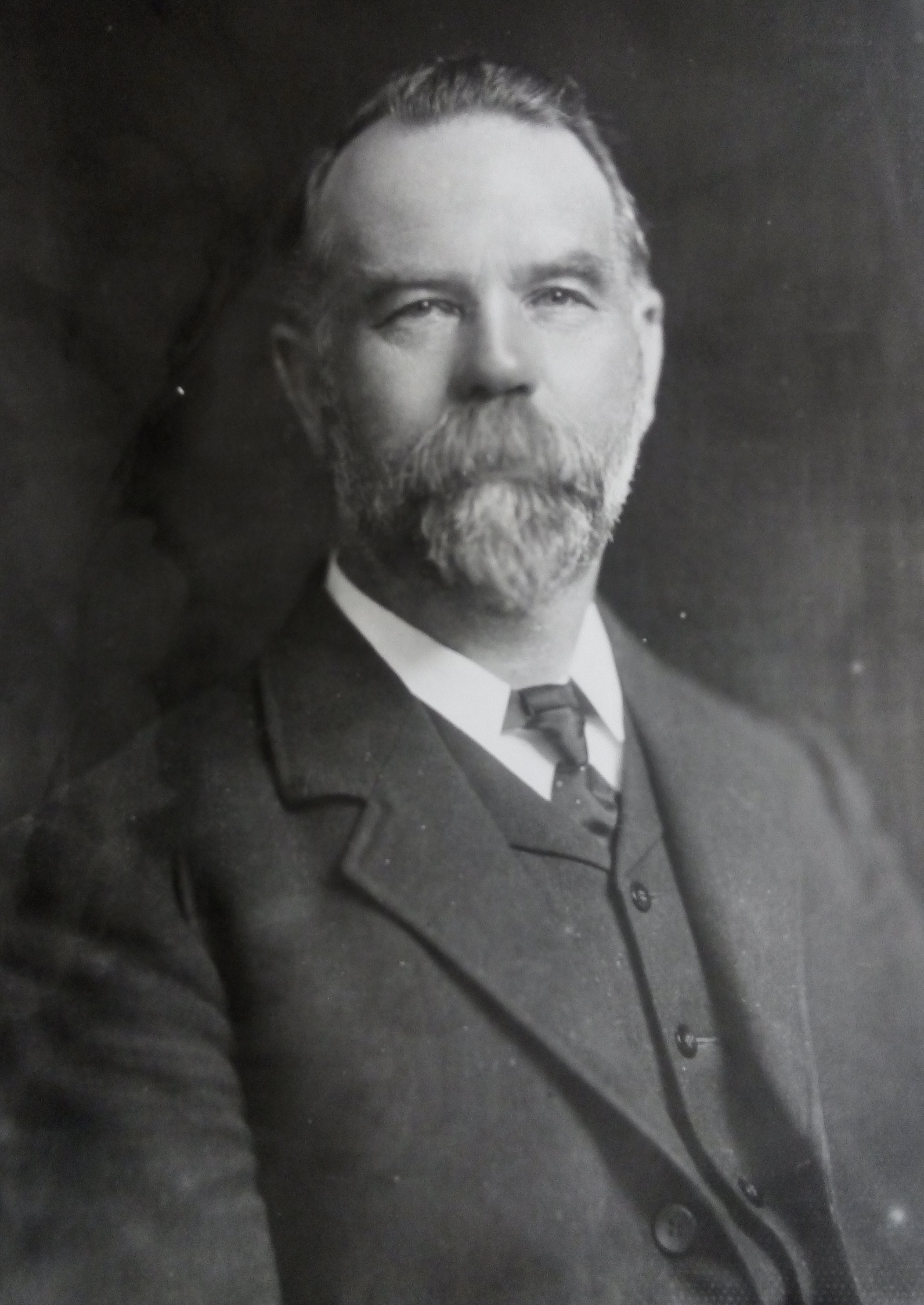
John Luke

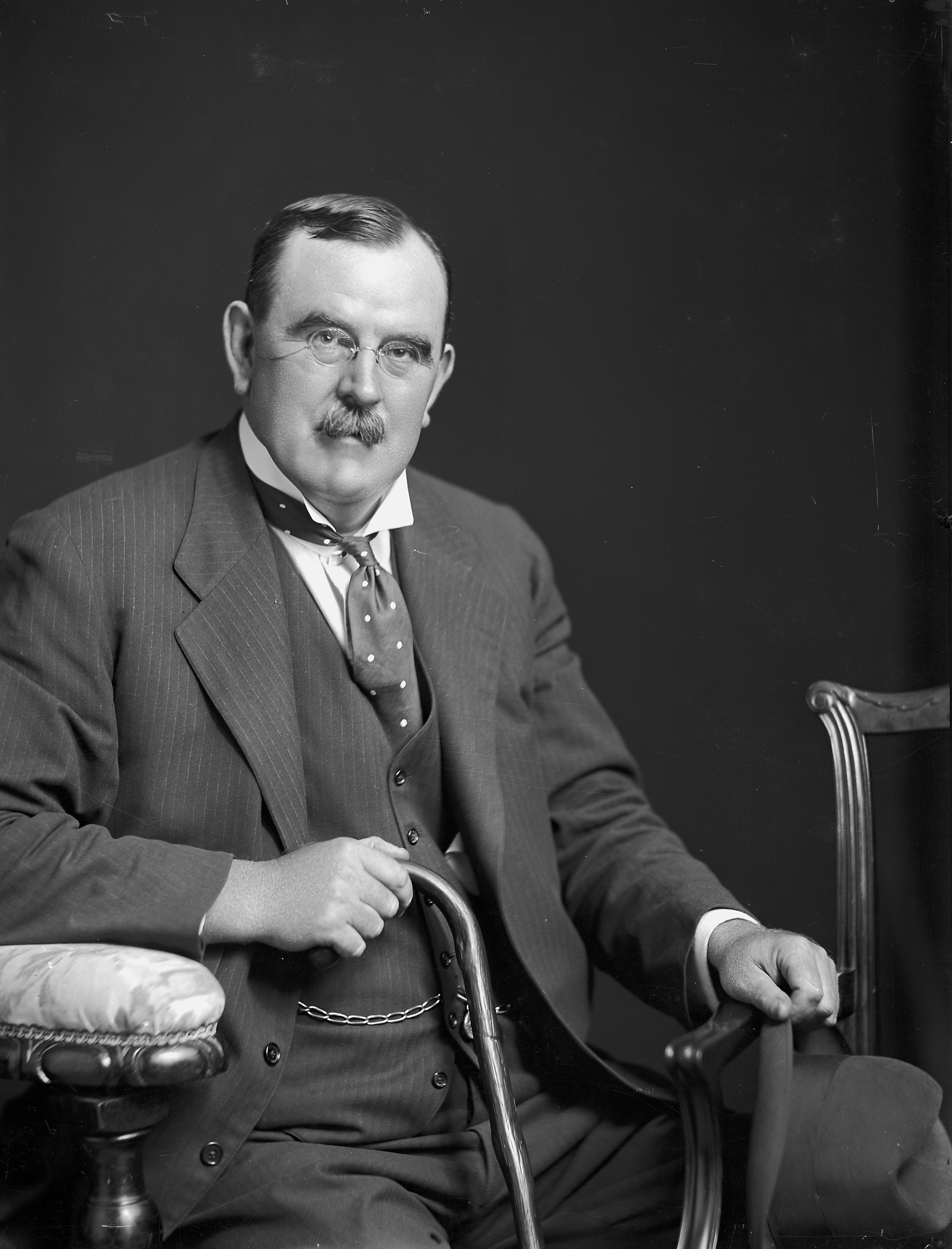
Henry Thacker

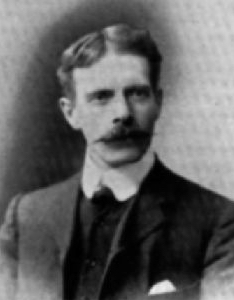
William Begg

== Events ==
- 1 May – The Colonist, established in 1857, publishes its final issue, and is incorporated into The Nelson Evening Mail.
- 11 May – Mataura railway station is destroyed by fire. A replacement railway station building opens the following year.
- 25 August – Captain Euan Dickson makes the first aerial crossing of Cook Strait, from Christchurch to Upper Hutt, in an Avro 504K.

== Arts and literature ==
See 1920 in art, 1920 in literature, Category:1920 books

=== Music ===
See: 1920 in music

=== Film ===
See: Category:1920 film awards, 1920 in film, List of New Zealand feature films, Cinema of New Zealand, Category:1920 films

== Sport ==
=== Chess ===
- The 29th National Chess Championship, held in Wellington, is won by W. E. Mason of Wellington, his fifth title.

=== Cricket ===
- Plunket Shield

=== Football ===
- Provincial league champions:
  - Auckland – YMCA
  - Canterbury – Nomads
  - Hawke's Bay – Waipukurau
  - Otago – Kaitangata FC
  - Southland – No competition
  - Wanganui – Eastbrooke
  - Wellington – Wellington Thistle

=== Golf ===
- The 10th New Zealand Open championship is won by J. H. Kirkwood
- The 24th National Amateur Championships are held in Hamilton:
  - Men – Sloan Morpeth (Hamilton)
  - Women – Noeline Wright (Timaru) (her second title)

=== Horse racing ===
==== Harness racing ====
- New Zealand Trotting Cup – Reta Peter
- Auckland Trotting Cup – Man O'War

==== Thoroughbred racing ====
- New Zealand Cup – Oratress
- Auckland Cup – Starland
- Wellington Cup – Kilmoon / Oratress (dead heat)
- New Zealand Derby – Duo

=== Lawn bowls ===
The national outdoor lawn bowls championships are held in Christchurch.

- Men's singles champion – E. Harraway (Dunedin Bowling Club)
- Men's pair champions – J. Turnbull, W. Spiller (skip) (Sydenham Bowling Club)
- Men's fours champions – H. Brookfield, F.L. Anderson, H.F. Tilley, A.P. London (skip) (Wanganui Bowling Club)

=== Olympic games ===
Gold	Silver	Bronze	Total
0	0	1	1

- New Zealand sends a team of four competitors across three sports
- Darcy Hadfield wins the bronze medal in the men's single sculls
- New Zealand also competes at the Inter-Allied Games held in Paris

=== Rugby league ===
- The Great Britain Lions tour New Zealand, winning the test series 3–0
  - 1st test, at Wellington, 23–10
  - 2nd test, at Christchurch, 19–3
  - 3rd test, at Auckland, 31–7

=== Rugby union ===
- The All Blacks tour New South Wales
- Wellington defends the Ranfurly Shield 10 times before losing it to Southland:
  - vs Canterbury 15–3
  - vs Bay of Plenty 22–3
  - vs Taranaki 20–9 (played in Hāwera)
  - vs Hawke's Bay 20–5
  - vs Auckland 23–20 (played in Auckland)
  - vs Taranaki 16–5
  - vs Wanganui 20–14
  - vs Auckland 20–3
  - vs South Canterbury 32–16 (played in Timaru)
  - vs Otago 16–5 (played in Dunedin)
  - vs Southland 6–17 (played in Invercargill)

=== Shooting ===
- Ballinger Belt – Herbert Croxton (Karori)

== Births ==
=== January–March ===
- 1 January – Ruth Ross, historian
- 4 January – Murray Gittos, fencer
- 6 January – Winifred Lawrence, swimmer
- 11 January – Betty Plant, netball player, coach and administrator
- 14 January – Don Beard, cricketer
- 24 January –
  - Len Jordan, rugby league player
  - Gerard Wall, surgeon and politician
- 26 January – Tapihana Paraire Paikea, politician
- 29 January – Bob Yule, fighter pilot
- 9 February – Fred Allen, rugby union player and coach
- 17 February – Dorothea Anne Franchi, pianist, harpist, music educator and composer
- 29 February – Mary Sullivan, netball player
- 9 March – Diggeress Te Kanawa, tohunga raranga
- 23 March – Peter Quilliam, jurist

=== April–June ===
- 2 April – David Gay, soldier, cricketer and educator
- 4 April – Jim Kearney, rugby union player
- 5 April – Pat Ralph, marine biology academic
- 12 April – Shona Dunlop MacTavish, dancer, choreographer
- 14 April – John Chewings, politician
- 23 April – Colin Horsley, classical pianist and music teacher
- 26 April – Joyce McDougall, psychoanalyst
- 17 May – Frank Corner, diplomat
- 18 May – Molly Macalister, sculptor
- 19 May – Frank Tredrea, cyclist
- 26 May
  - Frank Bethwaite, pilot, boat designer
  - Merimeri Penfold, Māori language academic
- 4 June – Bev Malcolm, netball player
- 8 June – Manahi Nitama Paewai, doctor, rugby union player, politician and community leader
- 20 June – John O'Shea, filmmaker
- 28 June – Kōhine Pōnika, composer of waiata Māori

=== July–September ===
- 10 July – Warwick Snedden, cricketer
- 11 July – Richard Dell, malacologist
- 9 August – Albert Jones, amateur astronomer
- 29 August
  - Eric Batchelor, soldier
  - Jack Laird, potter
- 3 September – Peter de la Mare, physical organic chemist
- 9 September – Joan Francis, cricketer
- 10 September – Russell Pettigrew, businessman and philanthropist
- 24 September – Alister Abernethy, trade unionist, politician and public servant
- 30 September
  - Margaret Alington, librarian and historian
  - Trevor Horne, politician

=== October–December ===
- 6 October – Hugh Sheridan, boxer
- 7 October – James Brodie, geologist, oceanographer and amateur historian and philatelist
- 8 October – Jean Wishart, magazine editor
- 24 October – Ron Westerby, rugby league player
- 28 October
  - Peggy Dunstan, poet, writer
  - Bob Stuart, rugby player and administrator
- 1 November – Harry Dansey, journalist, cartoonist, broadcaster, politician and race relations conciliator
- 9 November – John Macdonald, forensic psychiatrist
- 16 November – Ronald Davison, jurist
- 11 December – Gus Fisher, fashion industry leader and philanthropist
- 15 December – Peg Batty, cricketer
- 27 December – Warren Freer, politician
- 28 December – Marty McDonnell, Australian rules footballer

=== Exact date unknown ===
- Entreaty, Thoroughbred racehorse

== Deaths ==
=== January–March ===
- 5 January – Walter Gudgeon, farmer, soldier, historian, land court judge, colonial administrator (born 1841)
- 15 January – Richard Cockburn Maclaurin, mathematical physics academic (born 1870)
- 24 January – William Plunket, 5th Baron Plunket, Governor of New Zealand (1904–1910) (born 1864)
- 27 January – William Fitzgerald, teacher, educationalist (born 1838)
- 29 January – Constance Frost, doctor, bacteriologist, pathologist (born c.1863)
- 3 March – George Vesey Stewart, politician (born 1832)

=== April–June ===
- 10 April – Courtney Nedwill, doctor, public health officer (born 1837)
- 21 April – Jesse Piper, politician (born 1836)
- 26 April
  - George Robertson, rugby union player (born 1859)
  - George Hogben, educationalist, seismologist (born 1853)
- 2 May – A. L. Beattie, locomotive designer/engineer (born 1852)
- 6 May – James Black, cricketer (born 1873)
- 13 May – Fred Hobbs, politician (born 1841)
- 20 May – Henare Kaihau, politician
- 20 June – John Grigg, astronomer (born 1838)

=== July–September ===
- 23 July – Robin Dods, architect (born 1868)
- 28 July – Edward Shillington, librarian (born 1835)
- 17 August – Amey Daldy, women's suffrage campaigner (born 1829)
- 23 August – David Cossgrove, teacher, soldier, scout leader (born 1852)
- 25 August – Donald Reid, politician (born 1855)
- 31 August – William MacDonald, politician (born 1862)
- 26 September – Appo Hocton, servant, landlord, carter, farmer (born c.1823)

=== October–December ===
- 1 October – Henare Wepiha Te Wainohu, Māori leader, Anglican clergyman, army chaplain (born 1882)
- 7 October – Chew Chong, merchant, fungus exporter, butter manufacturer (born c.1844)
- 10 October – Meri Te Tai Mangakāhia, women's suffrage campaigner (born 1868)
- 14 October – Samuel Carnell, politician (born 1832)
- 21 October – Mary Gibbs, community leader (born 1836)
- 12 November – Thomas Porter, soldier, land purchase officer (born 1843)
- 14 November – Edward Ker Mulgan, newspaper editor, teacher, school inspector (born c.1858)
- 17 November – Alexander Hogg, politician (born 1841)
- 23 November – Cyril Mountfort, architect (born 1853)
- 28 November – Peter Webb, rugby union player (born 1854)
- 13 December – Joseph Tole, politician (born 1846)
- 16 December – George Jones, politician (born 1844)
- 27 December – Charles Button, politician, solicitor, judge (born 1838)

== See also ==
- History of New Zealand
- List of years in New Zealand
- Military history of New Zealand
- Timeline of New Zealand history
- Timeline of New Zealand's links with Antarctica
- Timeline of the New Zealand environment
