= James B. Brown =

James B. Brown may refer to:

- James Baldwin Brown (1820–1884), British Congregational minister
- James Boyer Brown (1919–2009), Australian gynaecologist
- James Brown (bishop of Louisiana) (born 1932), American prelate of the Episcopal Church

== See also ==
- James B. Brown House, historic home built near Hannibal, Missouri in the 1870s and named for a prominent local resident
- J. B. Brown (born 1967), nickname of American football player James Harold Brown
