= Edward Shillington =

Edward Shillington may refer to:

- Ned Shillington (Edward Blaine Shillington, born 1944), Canadian politician in Saskatchewan
- Edward Shillington (New Zealand) (1835–1920), New Zealand librarian
