= Wiremu Hoani Taua =

Wiremu Hoani Taua (1862 – 29 December 1919) was a New Zealand tribal leader and school principal. Of Māori descent, he identified with the Ngāti Kahu iwi (tribe). He was born in Kareponia, Northland, New Zealand in 1862.
