= Eric Godley =

New Zealand botanist and academic biographer

Eric John Godley
- Born: 10 April 1919; Devonport, New Zealand
- Died: 27 May 2010 (aged 91)
- Awards: OBE,
- Scientific career
- Fields: botany, biography

Eric John Godley (10 May 1919 – 27 June 2010) was a New Zealand botanist and academic biographer. He is best known for his long-running series of in the popular magazine New Zealand Gardener and his "Biographical notes" series that ran in the New Zealand Botanical Society Newsletter and which is the prime resource on the lives of many New Zealand botanists.

Born in the Auckland suburb of Devonport to parents Rupert and Louise E. Godley, Godley grew up in Auckland and did his BSc at MSc at Auckland University College, followed by service in World War II and a PhD at Cambridge in cytology and genetics under Ronald Fisher. He returned to lecture at Auckland before moving to the Department of Scientific and Industrial Research at Lincoln, rising to Director of the Botany Division 1958–1981. His work included three trips to the New Zealand subantarctic islands on three occasions, including the Antipodes Islands, the Auckland Islands and Campbell Island. These islands and the geographically separated flora and fauna are botanically important as studies in dispersion and evolution of plants and animals.

== Awards and honours ==
- 1974 – Leonard Cockayne Memorial Lecture of the Royal Society of New Zealand
- 1986 – Hutton Medal of the Royal Society of New Zealand
- 1990 – OBE For services to botany
