= Hamilton Gilmer =

New Zealand politician

Hamilton Gilmer (1838 – 25 June 1919) was a member of the New Zealand Legislative Council from 22 January 1907 to 21 January 1914, when his term ended. He was appointed by the Liberal Government

He was from Wellington, and died at his home there on 25 June 1919. Gilmer was buried at the Bolton Street Cemetery.
