= James Dawe =

New Zealand cricketer

James Dawe (1844 – 6 August 1919) was a New Zealand cricketer who played for Canterbury.

Dawe made a single first-class appearance for the side, during the 1873–74 season, against Otago. From the opening order, he scored a duck in the first innings in which he batted, and, when moved down the order in the second innings, scored two runs.
