= Mary Hames =

New Zealand dressmaker, farmer, and domestic servant

Mary Hames (née Maddox; 14 May 1827–3 April 1919) was a New Zealand dressmaker, farmer and domestic servant.

== Biography ==
She was born in Much Marcle, Herefordshire, England on 14 May 1827. She was the daughter of Richard Maddox and Priscilla Bowket.
