= Isabella Siteman =

Isabella Flora Siteman (c. 1842 – 18 March 1919) was a New Zealand domestic servant, farmer and philanthropist. She was born in Ninewells, Angus, Scotland, in about 1842.
