= Mary Sullivan (netball) =

New Zealand netball player

Personal information
- Full name: Mary Frances Sullivan
- Born: 29 February 1920
- Died: 29 March 1977 (aged 57)
- Height: 1.88 m (6 ft 2 in)

Netball career
- Playing positions: WA, C
Years	National team	Caps
1948	New Zealand	2

Mary Frances Sullivan (29 February 1920 – 29 March 1977) was a New Zealand netball player. She played in the New Zealand team in two Tests against the touring Australian team in 1948.

== Early life ==
Born on 29 February 1920, Sullivan was the daughter of Denis Sullivan, an employee of New Zealand Railways, and Fanny Mary Sullivan (née Price).

== Netball career ==
Playing as a shooter in the goal circle, Sullivan was a member of the Surrey Hills club in Grey Lynn, and was captain of the club's senior team. She played for the Auckland provincial netball team, and with a height of 1.88 metres (6 ft 2 in) she usually towered over her opponents.

After the 1947 national championships, won by Canterbury, Sullivan was selected as a forward for the New Zealand team to play the visiting Australian team the following year. New Zealand lost the first Test at Forbury Park in Dunedin 16–27, with Sullivan playing at wing attack. She was reported to be "the hardest worked player" on court, and it was said that she was "probably the most deceptive member of either team". Sullivan missed the second Test, but returned as vice-captain for the third Test in Auckland, which was won by Australia, 44–22.

In 1949, Sullivan was part of the Auckland team that won the national provincial championships.

== Later life and death ==
Sullivan worked as an office manager. She died on 29 March 1977, and was buried at Waikumete Cemetery in Auckland.
