= Murray Beresford Roberts =

- Born: 10 August 1919; Wellington, New Zealand
- Died: 5 August 1974 (aged 54); Papakura
- Education: King's School, Auckland; Newington College; Auckland Grammar School
- Occupations: Confidence trickster and thief
- Children: 1 son
- Parent(s): Annie Isabelle (née Huckstep) & Andrew Murray Roberts

Murray Beresford Roberts (10 August 1919 – 5 August 1974) was a New Zealand-born Australian confidence trickster and thief who died in New Zealand.

== Biography ==
Roberts was born in Wellington, New Zealand, the only child of Andrew Murray Roberts, a surveyor, and his wife, Annie Isabelle (née Huckstep). He was brought up in a well-to-do Auckland home by his Presbyterian father and Baptist mother. As a child he attended church services in both of those Christian denominations.

He started school at the independent preparatory school King's School, Auckland. When his parents lived in Sydney, Australia, he briefly attended Newington College during 1931. Newington was then affiliated with the Methodist Church of Australasia. On his parents return to New Zealand he attended Auckland Grammar School.

After dropping out of the University of Otago medical school when caught cheating at an exam Roberts spent his life impersonating medics, military men, writers and academics. When each charade fell through, he would move to a new town and new circle of targets. In 1945 Philip Le Couteur appointed him as a physics master and boarding resident master at his Sydney alma mater, Newington College. Apparently he had produced excellent references from schools in New Zealand. Members of the Common Room at Newington became suspicious when he attempted to air his scientific knowledge. The ruse lasted only six weeks before he disappeared from the campus. His fraudulent teaching record at Newington, Brisbane Boys' College and Dookie Agricultural College were used as evidence against him in a later trial in Perth, Western Australia, in 1955.

Roberts' roles included Assistant medical director of the New Zealand Division (Army), a naval surgeon commander, governor general designate, professor of neuropsychiatry, manager of Barclays bank, a major-general, atomic scientist, High Court judge, famous German industrialist, a well-known author, professor of classics. Many seem to have been undertaken for the pleasure he obtained rather than financial gain.

Roberts had a son from the first of his two marriages made in Australia. He died in Papakura in New Zealand on 5 August 1974. He was cremated on 9 August 1974 and his remains were scattered at Waikumete Cemetery. His autobiography was published posthumously.
