= Beverley Malcolm =

New Zealand netball player (1920–2016)

Personal information
- Full name: Beverley Elizabeth Malcolm (Née: Avery)
- Born: 4 June 1920 Devonport, New Zealand
- Died: 22 November 2016 (aged 96) Howick, New Zealand
- Height: 1.67 m (5 ft 6 in)
- Spouse: John Malcolm

Netball career
- Playing positions: GS, GA
Years	National team	Caps
1948	New Zealand	1

Beverley Elizabeth Malcolm (née Avery; 4 June 1920 – 22 November 2016) was a New Zealand netball player. She was the captain of the New Zealand team in the second Test match against the touring Australian team in 1948.

== Early life ==
Malcolm was born Beverley Elizabeth Avery in Devonport on Auckland's North Shore on 4 June 1920, a twin daughter of George Percival Malcolm and Louisa Maude Malcolm.

== Netball career ==
Avery played provincial representative netball for Wellington. In 1948, she captained the New Zealand national team in the second Test against the touring Australian team in New Plymouth. The Australian team was victorious, winning 44–13. The match was the only occasion on which Avery represented New Zealand, because the New Zealand side for the three-Test series was selected on a regional basis, and New Zealand did not play another international game until 1960.

== Later life and death ==
Avery married John Malcolm. After living in Eastbourne and Orewa, Bev Malcolm died in a rest home in the Auckland suburb of Howick on 22 November 2016, having been predeceased by her husband.
