= Bob Yule =

New Zealand-born officer of the Royal Air Force

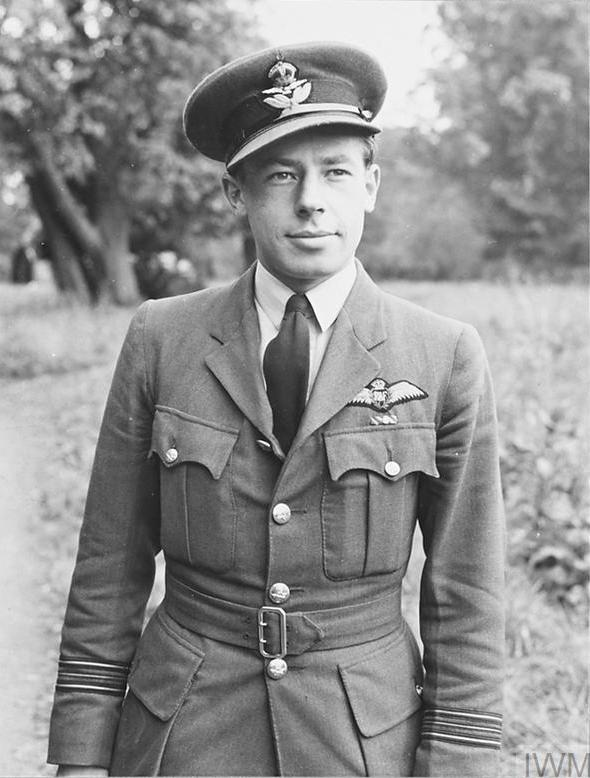
- Born: 29 January 1920; Invercargill, New Zealand
- Died: 11 September 1953 (aged 33); London, England
- Military career
- Allegiance: United Kingdom
- Branch: Royal Air Force
- Service years: 1938–1953
- Rank: Wing Commander
- Commands: No. 28 Squadron; No. 15 Wing; No. 66 Squadron RAF (1942)
- Conflicts: Second World War; Malayan Emergency
- Awards: Distinguished Service Order; Distinguished Flying Cross & Bar

Robert Duncan Yule, DSO, DFC & Bar (29 January 1920 – 11 September 1953) was a New Zealand-born officer of the Royal Air Force (RAF) and a flying ace of the Second World War. He was credited with destroying eight enemy aircraft.

Born in Invercargill, Yule was awarded a scholarship to attend the Royal Air Force College Cranwell. When the Second World War broke out, he entered the RAF and was posted to No. 145 Squadron. He flew several flight operations during the Battle of France, shooting down at least one German aircraft, and covered the Dunkirk evacuation. During the Battle of Britain, he damaged several enemy aircraft. After a period of instructing duties, he was appointed commander of No. 66 Squadron, leading it on several operations to France. He later led No. 15 Wing. The last 18 months of the war were spent on staff duties with the 2nd Tactical Air Force. He remained in the RAF in the postwar period, serving in Air Command Far East and commanding No. 28 Squadron during the Malayan Emergency. He was killed when his aircraft crashed during rehearsals for the Battle of Britain flypast over London.

== Early life ==
Robert Duncan Yule was born on 29 January 1920 in Invercargill, New Zealand, the son of G. J. Yule, a dental surgeon. Educated at Southland Boys' High School, in early 1938, Yule won a scholarship to the Royal Air Force College Cranwell. He departed for England on 10 March aboard the vessel Rangitiki. He commenced the RAF course late the following month. Normally a two-year course, it was abbreviated as a result of the outbreak of the Second World War in September 1939 and Yule entered the Royal Air Force on 7 September. He was commissioned as a pilot officer with probationary status on 23 October 1939.

== Second World War ==
Yule was posted to No. 145 Squadron, based at Croydon, in November 1939. His new unit was a newly reformed fighter unit, operating Bristol Blenheim heavy fighters on day and night operations. However in March 1940 it began converting to the Hawker Hurricane, a process that took two months by which time it was flying aircraft to France to assist the fighter squadrons there. On 18 May, Yule took part in No. 145 Squadron's first action of the war, when on patrol over Brussels, 12 Heinkel He 111 medium bombers were intercepted in broken cloud. When the German bombers emerged from cover the squadron attacked, Yule shooting one down that had been damaged by his flight leader. Four days later he destroyed a Junkers Ju 87 dive bomber, one of three encountered near Arras.

At the end of May and into early June, the squadron helped with aerial cover during the Dunkirk evacuation. During this time Yule shot down a Messerschmitt Bf 110 heavy fighter northeast of Dunkirk. For the remainder of the month he flew on several patrols over the English Channel and escorted bombers on missions to France. In early July, he helped shoot down a Dornier Do 17 medium bomber near Brighton.

=== Battle of Britain ===
Once the Battle of Britain commenced, the intensity of operations picked up, with Yule flying numerous convoy patrols and interception missions. He was one of three pilots who shot down a Do 17 over the English Channel on 10 July, the opening day of the battle. This was followed by his damaging of a Junkers Ju 88 medium bomber near the Isle of Wight on 13 July, and he was also credited with the probable shooting down of a Bf 110 the same day. He shared in the shooting down of a Do 17 off Brighton. He damaged two more Ju 88s in July before the squadron was rested. They returned to action in October, flying from Tangmere. The pace of the aerial fighting had slowed somewhat but Yule damaged a Ju 88 on 17 October. Promoted to flying officer on 23 October, two days later, he was shot down by a Messerschmitt Bf 109 fighter in combat over Kent and was admitted to hospital with leg wounds after making a forced landing which completely wrote off his Hurricane.

Yule rejoined No. 145 Squadron in February 1941, at the time converting to Supermarine Spitfire fighters, but shortly afterwards was posted away to be an instructor at No. 53 Operational Training Unit at Heston. Now a flight lieutenant, he helped instruct American pilots, very much under secrecy because the United States was still neutral. In early November, he returned to operations with No. 501 Squadron, which was based at Ibsley. He remained with the unit for seven months during which time, he carried out various convoy patrols, interception missions and attacks on enemy shipping. In April 1942, he was awarded the Distinguished Flying Cross (DFC). The citation, published in The London Gazette, read:

Flight Lieutenant Yule took part in operations in France in May, 1940, and subsequently fought in the Battle of Britain. He is a keen and courageous fighter pilot, and he has destroyed at least 5 hostile aircraft and damaged 4 others.

— London Gazette, No. 35528, 17 April 1942.

=== Channel Front ===
Promoted to squadron leader in June 1942, Yule assumed command of No. 66 Squadron. His squadron was tasked with carrying out offensive operations to France, flying Spitfire Vbs. On a sweep to the Cherbourg area on 15 July, Yule got into a dogfight with two Focke-Wulf Fw 190 fighters. He shot down one into the sea while the engine of the other Fw 190 was damaged. The next month, he led the squadron during the aerial operations in support of the Dieppe Raid, carrying out escort missions for bombers. In mid-November 1942, having completed his first tour, Yule was posted to general office duties at the headquarters of No. 10 Group although he still made the occasional operational flight. He was subsequently awarded a Bar to his DFC. The citation read:

Since being awarded the Distinguished Flying Cross in February this year, Squadron Leader Yule has displayed untiring devotion to duty, fine fighting spirit and excellent leadership which have been an example of the highest order. He has participated in many operational sorties and in the combined operations at Dieppe. He has destroyed several and damaged a number of other enemy aircraft.

— London Gazette, No. 35791, 20 November 1942.

In August 1943, Yule was promoted to acting wing commander and returned to flight operations as leader of No. 15 Wing, based at Detling. The wing carried out numerous offensive sweeps to France, led by Yule. During one such sweep, on 6 January 1944, he destroyed a Fw 190. He damaged another Fw 190 the following week. In early March he was transferred to 83 Group Control Centre, tasked with planning and co-ordinate the operations of the various fighter wings of the 2nd Tactical Air Force in the coming Normandy invasion. Shortly after commencing his new role, he was awarded the Distinguished Service Order. The published citation read:

This officer has led large formations of aircraft on very many sorties and has displayed skill and determination of the highest order. He is a splendid leader, whose sterling qualities have impressed all. He has rendered much meritorious service.

— London Gazette, No. 36429, 17 March 1944.

Yule continued with his planning duties after the D-Day landings which now included co-ordinating fighter support for the advancing Allied ground forces in France. In early 1945 he attended a RAF Staff College course and then took up a post at the Air Ministry, working in the Directorate of Policy. He ended the war credited with destroying eight enemy aircraft, five of which were shared with other pilots. He also claimed at least two probable destroyed aircraft with one shared, one damaged aircraft with three shared.

== Postwar career ==
In July 1947 Yule went on unpaid leave, travelling to New Zealand with his family. When he returned to duty he was posted to Singapore to serve on the staff of the headquarters of Air Command Far East and was then given command of No. 28 Squadron. During the Malayan Emergency his command carried out strikes on the hideouts of communist insurgents before moving to Hong Kong as a reinforcement for the defences there. In late 1950, he returned to the United Kingdom to join the Central Fighter Establishment. The following year he was promoted to wing commander and given command of the station at Horsham St. Faith.

While rehearsing for the Battle of Britain flypast over London on 11 September 1953, Yule was flying a Gloster Meteor and collided with another jet aircraft. Faced with a densely populated area, Yule steered his now tailless aircraft towards Woolwich Arsenal and crash-landed between rows of buildings. He was killed in the crash.
