= Lester Harvey =

- Born: Lester Robert Harvey; 14 April 1919 Dunedin, New Zealand
- Died: 3 June 1993 (aged 74) Clyde, New Zealand
- Height: 1.90 m (6 ft 3 in)
- Weight: 99 kg (218 lb)
- School: Waitaki Boys' High School
- Occupation: Farmer

Rugby union career
- Position: Lock
Provincial / State sides
Years	Team	Apps	(Points)
1947–50s	Otago		
International career
Years	Team	Apps	(Points)
1949–50	New Zealand	8	(0)

Lester Robert Harvey (14 April 1919 – 3 June 1993) was a New Zealand rugby union player. A lock, Harvey represented Otago at a provincial level, and was a member of the New Zealand national side, the All Blacks, in 1949 and 1950. He played 22 matches for the All Blacks including eight internationals.
