= Pat Ralph =

New Zealand marine biologist and university lecturer

Patricia Marjorie Ralph (5 April 1920 – 23 March 1995) was a New Zealand marine biologist and university lecturer.

She was born in Wellington, New Zealand in 1920. She graduated from Victoria University College with a Bachelor of Science in 1941 and a Master of Science two years later. She remained as a demonstrator at Victoria College and became a junior lecturer and then received a tenured position in 1949. Her work in marine biology received worldwide attention and she was awarded a Doctor of Science in 1962, the first woman at Victoria to be recognised with that degree. Two species of coral, Sphenotrochus ralphae and Caryophyllia ralphae, were named for her.

Ralph died at Paraparaumu in 1995, and her ashes were buried in Bolton Street Memorial Park, Wellington.
