= Marty McDonnell =

Australian rules footballer and coach

Personal information
- Full name: Martin Joseph McDonnell
- Born: 28 December 1920; Wellington, New Zealand
- Died: 22 December 2005 (aged 84); Perth, Western Australia
- Original team: West Footscray
- Height: 183 cm (6 ft 0 in)
- Weight: 80 kg (176 lb)
- Position: Defender

Playing career^{1}
| Years | Club | Games (Goals) |
| 1939–41, 1944, 1946–50 | Footscray | 92 (2) |

Coaching career^{3}
| Years | Club | Games (W–L–D) |
| 1960–1963 | South Fremantle | 86 (37–47–2) |
- ^{1} Playing statistics correct to the end of 1950.^{3} Coaching statistics correct as of 1963.

Martin Joseph McDonnell (28 December 1920 – 22 December 2005) was an Australian rules footballer who played for Footscray in the Victorian Football League (VFL). He was born in New Zealand.

Recruited from West Footscray, McDonnell was a defender, used often at full-back. He was only a regular in the team after the war, having missed the entire 1942, 1943 and 1945 seasons due to service in the Pacific War. From 1947 to 1949, McDonnell missed just three games and he received the equal most votes by a Footscray player in the 1947 Brownlow Medal count. He represented the VFL eight times during his career.

He retired after the 1950 season and applied for the job of Footscray coach but after missing out joined Yarrawonga and coached them in the Ovens & Murray Football League, until 1954.

McDonnell was signed by South Fremantle as coach in 1960 and remained in that role for four years to mixed results: the club played finals for the first time in four seasons in 1960 and did so again in 1962, but in 1961 and 1963 the red and whites won just six matches in each season for last and second-last placings, so that his contract was not renewed after 1963 in favour of Ray Sorrell.
