= Ron Westerby =

New Zealand international rugby league footballer

Personal information
- Full name: Ronald Eric Leslie Westerby
- Born: 24 October 1920
- Died: 3 July 1997 (aged 76)

Playing information
- Position: Prop
Representative
Years	Team	Pld	T	G	FG	P
≤1949–≥49	Wellington
1949	New Zealand	1	0	0	0	0

Ronald Eric Leslie Westerby (24 October 1920 – 3 July 1997) was a New Zealand professional rugby league footballer who played in the 1940s. He played at representative level for New Zealand, and Wellington, as a prop.

== Playing career ==
=== International honours ===
Westerby represented New Zealand in 1949 against Australia.
