= Peggy Dunstan =

- Born: Margaret Elizabeth Baylis; 28 October 1920; Christchurch, New Zealand
- Died: 7 January 2010 (aged 89); Auckland, New Zealand
- Education: Wellington East Girls' College
- Writing career
- Language: English

Margaret Elizabeth Dunstan (née Baylis; 28 October 1920 – 7 January 2010) was a New Zealand poet and writer.

== Biography ==
Dunstan was born in Christchurch, New Zealand, on 28 October 1920, and was educated at Wellington East Girls' College. She began writing poetry when she was an adult, and her first poems were published in English and American magazines and in the New Zealand Listener. She initially sent her work to publishers under the name Patrick Duggan, as she thought editors would be more likely to select submissions written by a man.

Dunstan set up writing workshops in her home to encourage other women poets, and invited more experienced and well-known poets to tutor the newer writers. She also worked with psychiatric patients, and helped them to produce poems of publishable standard.

Her writing spanned a range of subject areas. Some deal with issues of life in urban and suburban areas, and others discuss the tension between domestic demands on her time and her aspirations as a writer.

Dunstan was a member of the Penwomen's Club and in 1985 she co-edited Hyacinths and Biscuits, the club's diamond jubilee prose and verse anthology.

Dunstan died in Auckland on 7 January 2010.

== Publications ==
=== Poetry ===
- Patterns on glass: selected poems, Christchurch, N.Z., Pegasus Press, 1968
- A particular deep: selected poems, Christchurch, N.Z., Pegasus Press, 1974
- Sunflowers and sandcastles: a selection of poems for children, Wellington, N.Z., Millwood Press, 1977
- In and out the windows, Auckland, N.Z., Hodder and Stoughton, 1980
- Behind the stars: poems for children, Auckland, N.Z., Hodder and Stoughton, 1986
- Red Horse and the undersea rescue, Wellington, N.Z., Silver Owl Press, 1993
- I can do anything, Auckland, N.Z., Heinemann Education, 1995

=== Memoirs ===
- A Fistful of Summer, Christchurch, N.Z., Whitcoulls, 1981
- The Other Side of Summer, Auckland, N.Z., Hodder and Stoughton, 1983
