= Francis Peter Cusack =

New Zealand labourer and character

Francis Peter Cusack (4 February 1919 – 14 December 1990) was a New Zealand labourer and character. He was born in Winton, Southland, New Zealand on 4 February 1919. He gained notoriety for being "one of Southland’s most eccentric sons," frequently seen wearing dresses and living a vagabond lifestyle.
