= Frank Tredrea =

New Zealand racing cyclist and tennis umpire (1920–1999)

Personal information
- Full name: Francis Theodore D'Auncey Tredrea
- Born: 19 May 1920
- Died: 23 August 1999 (aged 79)

Cycling career
- Sport: Cycling
- Disciplines: Track, road
- Role: Rider

Francis Theodore D'Auncey Tredrea (19 May 1920 – 23 August 1999), known as Frank Tredrea, was a New Zealand racing cyclist who represented New Zealand at the 1950 British Empire Games in Auckland, and later twice won the professional Taranaki 100-mile Round the Mountain race. He also worked as a tennis umpire at major New Zealand tournaments.

== Early life and family ==
Tredrea was born on 19 May 1920, the son of Edgar Martin Tredrea and Ada Avoca Tredrea (née Poulton). As a teenager he lived in Point Chevalier, Auckland. He married Nola Kathleen Merrie at St Andrew's Church, Taneatua, on 26 December 1942.

== Cycling ==
In August 1939, during a road race near Silverdale, Tredrea (then aged 19) fractured his thumb when a motorcyclist rode into the field of riders.

In February 1946 he set a New Zealand amateur human-paced 10-mile track record of 20 minutes 26.2 seconds at Cook's Gardens, Wanganui, which the New Zealand Amateur Cycling Association later recognised. Contemporary reports also recorded him winning the senior paced 10-mile championship at the national amateur track championships at Western Springs, Auckland, in March 1947 in a New Zealand record time of 20 minutes 17.4 seconds.

At the 1950 British Empire Games in Auckland he competed in the men's 10-mile scratch race at Western Springs Stadium, finishing unplaced. At the 1954 New Zealand championships in Waimate he finished third in both the quarter-mile and two-mile finals.

As a professional he won the Taranaki 100-mile Round the Mountain race twice. In October 1955 he held off W. Anderson (Auckland) by inches to win the 30th annual professional race from the six-minute mark. In October 1959 he won again, becoming the first rider to take the title twice; he also recorded the fastest time of the day (4 hours 6 minutes 20 seconds) and with it the New Zealand 100-mile road cycling championship and the John Bull Challenge Cup.

In 1961 he won a two-day tour staged by the New Plymouth Cycle and Athletic League.

In later life Tredrea developed Parkinson's disease. In 1993 he resumed cycling to help manage the condition and competed in masters events.

== Tennis umpiring ==
Tredrea also officiated as a tennis umpire. In January 1973 he was listed as umpire for matches at a tournament covered by The Press in Christchurch. In January 1978, while umpiring the Teltscher men's singles final, he overruled a linesman and awarded a point to Onny Parun, drawing a protest from opponent Eliot Teltscher.

== Death ==
Tredrea died on 23 August 1999, aged 79. His ashes were interred at Waikumete Cemetery, Glen Eden, Auckland.
