= Courtney Nedwill =

New Zealand doctor and public health officer

Courtney Nedwill (14 August 1837 – 10 April 1920) was an Irish-born New Zealand doctor and public health officer.

Nedwill was born in Ballyronan, County Londonderry, Ireland. He did his medical training at Queen's College in Belfast. After qualifying he worked at Belfast General Hospital and began training at the army medical school. For health reasons he emigrated to New Zealand arriving as ship's surgeon on board the Chariot of Fame in 1863. He settled in Rangiora as a general practitioner but in 1864 moved to Christchurch where he held a number of positions: surgeon with the Canterbury Rifle Volunteers and to Addington prison, medical officer to the Christchurch Board of Health from 1879 to 1885 and surgeon and physician at Christchurch Hospital for 30 years from 1874. In 1876 he was named as lecturer in surgery for a proposed medical school which did not eventuate at that time. He was a fierce advocate for better sanitation in Christchurch particularly the construction of a proper sewerage system and phasing out of cesspits along with clean water supplies and reducing the incidence of typhoid.

Nedwill was known for speaking out when he observed incompetence. One such instance was against Dr Francis McBean Stewart over a patient's death after hernia surgery in 1884. Nedwill viewed the resulting inquiry as unsatisfactory and in 1885 succeeded in getting the Evening Post in Wellington to publish the story whereupon Stewart sued the paper and Nedwill for libel. Although Stewart won the case Nedwill was required to pay such minimal damages that he was effectively exonerated. However the case along with other earlier complaints against other doctors' incompetence made him a number of enemies in the medical profession.

In 1868 he married Ada Mary Nicholls in Christchurch and they had three daughters and one son. His son Courtney Llewellyn Nedwill (1876 – 1929) was a doctor and medical officer at the Trentham Military Camp during World War I. His grandson Richard John Courtney Nedwill (1913 – 1941) was killed in action during World War II.

In addition to his medical career he was also president of the Canterbury Lawn Tennis Association and West Christchurch Cricket Club.

Nedwill died in Christchurch on 10 April 1920. He is said to have been "one of Christchurch's most prominent medical men for half a century".

== Selected publications ==
- Nedwill, Courtney (1884). "CHRISTCHURCH HOSPITAL, NEW ZEALAND: UNREDUCED DISLOCATION OF THE FOOT BACKWARDS OF THREE MONTHS' DURATION". The Lancet. 123 (3161): 564–565. doi:10.1016/S0140-6736(02)22521-0. ISSN 0140-6736.
- Nedwill, Courtney (1898). "CHRISTCHURCH HOSPITAL, NEW ZEALAND: FIVE CASES OF ABDOMINAL SURGERY AND A CASE OF HYDATID TUMOUR OF THE BRAIN". The Lancet. 151 (3900): 1464–1467. doi:10.1016/S0140-6736(01)77742-2. ISSN 0140-6736.
