= James B. Brown House =

Historic house in Missouri, United States

- U.S. National Register of Historic Places
- Location within Missouri Location within the United States
- Location: 2400 Carrs Lane, Hannibal, Missouri
- Coordinates: 39°40′10″N 91°22′50″W
- Area: 21.9 acres (8.9 ha)
- Built: 1870-1872
- NRHP reference No.: 84002603
- Added to NRHP: January 26, 1984

James B. Brown House, also known as Stonecroft Manor, is a historic home located near Hannibal, Ralls County, Missouri. It was built between 1870 and 1872, and is a two-story, five-bay, rubble limestone I-house with a central passage plan. It features a Greek Revival style front porch and Italianate details. It has a truncated hip roof and the one-story rear ell also has a hipped roof. It was built as a summer home for James Brown a prominent local citizen of Hannibal, Missouri.

It was listed on the National Register of Historic Places in 1984.
