= James Boyer Brown =

James Boyer Brown (7 October 1919 – 31 October 2009) MSc (NZ) PhD (Edin) DSc (Edin) FRACOG, Professor Emeritus, Department of Obstetrics and Gynaecology, University of Melbourne.

== Early life and education ==
Boyer Brown was born in New Zealand and educated at Auckland University College where he obtained an MSc in chemistry with First Class Honours.

== Work ==
=== Early work ===
During the 1950s Brown worked in the University of Edinburgh as part of the team that developed methods for accurately measuring the metabolites of the oestrogens, progesterone and luteinising hormone in urine and, for the first time, documented the precise patterns of these hormones throughout the fertile ovulatory cycle and related these patterns of ovulation and fertility.

After the war in 1947, he developed an interest in endocrinology and reproduction and started a small animal breeding surgery, set up bioassays for urinary gonadotrophins and oestrogen (the female hormone) and concluded that the most important requirement in human reproduction was the development of a highly accurate method for timing ovulation in women, similar to the phenomenon of oestrus in animals. Measurements of the oestrogens seemed to be the answer and he received a National Research Scholarship to work in Edinburgh under Professor Guy Marrian FRS, one of the discoverers of oestrogens.

His aim was to develop a chemical method for measuring the oestrogens in the urine and was given a position in the newly established Clinical Endocrinology Research Unit in the University of Edinburgh, later to be appointed its Assistant Director. Notwithstanding Marrian's attempts at dissuading him from this project, Brown persisted and the essential problems were solved within a few months but a fully validated method was not published until 1955. This published paper has been cited over 1000 times and was awarded a full Citation Classic by the Institute for Scientific Information.

Using this new method of measurement, Brown confirmed the elegant patterns of oestrogen production throughout the menstrual cycle which had been shown previously using labour-intensive bioassays. This work led to the award in 1952 of a Ph.D. from the university, and the Lancet requested the privilege of publishing the results obtained during the menstrual cycle, conception, pregnancy, lactation and return to fertility. His method was the "gold standard" for measuring these hormones for almost 20 years until superseded by radioimmunoassays on blood. He also collaborated with Arnold Klopper in developing a urinary Pregnanediol assay in non-pregnant women which was awarded a half Citation Classic.

Possibly one of the greatest contributions made by Brown in his early days in Edinburgh was the use of human gonadotrophin for the induction of ovulation. Working with colleagues there they purified these hormones and later developed the International Standard Reference Preparation facilitating their widespread usage. The Edinburgh unit was the second in the world to use human gonadotrophins for ovulation induction in humans but Brown, later working in Melbourne, would properly rationalise their usage.

Boyer Brown's interest in reproduction began in the 1940s in New Zealand when he observed the rapid progress being made in animal reproduction at the time. This progress was made possible by understanding the phenomenon of oestrus which enabled the fertile time of the animal ovarian cycle and ovulation to be determined with precision (oestrus causes the female to accept the male only at the most fertile time of the cycle). He reasoned that an equally accurate method for timing ovulation in the human would allow the same progress to be made. Furthermore, as Nature uses the interaction between oestrogen and progesterone produced by the ovaries to manifest oestrus, measurement of these hormones was the most likely method of achieving his aim. Consequently, he joined the research team in Edinburgh of Professor Guy Marrian who was one of the men who isolated and characterised the oestrogens. During the 1950s the team was successful in developing methods for accurately measuring the metabolites of the oestrogens, progesterone and luteinising hormone in urine and, for the first time, documented the precise patterns of these hormones throughout the fertile ovulatory cycle and related these patterns to ovulation and fertility.

=== Later work ===
Having established a reputation in the field, James Brown was involved in practically every major development in human reproduction since then until his retirement in 1985. He was a member of Dr Gregory Pincus's think-tank for the development of the oral contraceptive pill and performed the early work on its action. He was surprised that the pill was so quickly and universally adopted by women without an adequate study of its safety and possible long-term effects. At the same time he was pioneering work on assisted reproduction including the use of timed intercourse (as used by Nature in the phenomenon of oestrus) and clomiphene and human gonatrophin for women with deficient ovarian activity. The Swedes won the race to be the first to use human gonadotrophin but reported a startling multiple pregnancy and hyperstimulation rate.

He was involved in the assessment of the oral contraceptive but in 1962 turned down an offer by Dr Geoffrey Pincus, its originator, to work with him. Instead he went to help set up the Endocrine Clinic at the Royal Women's Hospital in Melbourne, Australia, as a safe and highly effective method achieving pregnancy in anovulatory women and developed the Threshold Hypothesis of gonadothrophin action. In 1962 James Brown joined the Department of Obstetrics and Gynaecology, University of Melbourne. With colleagues, he developed methods for the safe use of human gonadotrophin with the minimum of multiple pregnancies, and for a time produced all the gonadotrophin for clinical use in Australia, New Zealand, Singapore and parts of Canada. It was from these clinical results that he developed the incremental system of gonadotrophin therapy and propounded the threshold hypothesis of gonadotrophin action on the ovary. The threshold hypothesis explained, for the first time, how only one follicle is usually selected for ovulation in the human, but it took 20 years for the explanation to be universally accepted. The pregnancy rate achieved with gonadotrophin therapy has not been bettered. The key to this success was in mimicking the hormone patterns of the natural cycle as closely as possible, a point which is still not fully appreciated today. He continually improved the sensitivity, speed and convenience of the methods for measuring oestrogen and progesterone metabolites in urine, so that the lowest concentrations found in the human could be measured. In the early 1970s, the rest of the world changed to blood assays for monitoring ovarian and pituitary activity. The validation of these blood assays depended on demonstrating that the hormone patterns obtained were the same as those obtained by the urinary assays.

During a sabbatical year in 1970, Brown gained a D.Sc. from the University of Edinburgh and delivered 63 lectures and demonstrations in Europe and the USA.

In 1971 he was given a Personal Chair in the Department of Obstetrics and Gynaecology at the University of Melbourne and was a member of the IVF team led by Carl Wood. His work and understanding of ovarian function was linked to the development of the early techniques for egg pick up in IVF and were used in the first successful IVF pregnancy in Britain.

During the 1970s he studied the effects of the intrauterine device on ovarian and menstrual function and was a member of the Melbourne In Vitro Fertilisation (IVF) team led by Prof Carl Wood. With infertility due to anovulation now fully treatable, James Brown joined Professor Carl Wood's team which was developing in vitro fertilisation (IVF) for achieving pregnancy in women with occluded fallopian tubes. During the next 7 years he provided the expertise for timing egg pick-up for IVF and also was the optimist that success would ultimately come. His methods for timing egg pick-up were also used for achieving the first IVF pregnancy in Britain. Although he is one of the "fathers" of IVF in Melbourne, he is critical of some of the bizarre applications of IVF, of some of its subsequent developments and its low pregnancy rates.

Other interests include research on hormone-dependent cancers, notably cancers of the breast, endometrium and ovaries. As much time was devoted to cancer research as to reproduction. Studies were conducted during the 1950s on the effect of endocrine ablation as a treatment for breast cancer. Later, with colleagues at Harvard University, a large international study was conducted on risk factors in the development of breast cancer. This work was awarded the Prix Antoine Lacassagne from Paris in 1986 as the most important contribution to the study of breast cancer for that year.

James Brown met Doctors John and Evelyn Billings in 1962 and immediately appreciated the rightness of their findings and aims. The research that followed and the way it fitted in with his other studies is described in his booklet "Studies in Human Reproduction". As blood is not suitable for the serial assays required for long-term monitoring of ovarian activity, particularly at home, and his laboratory was apparently the only one in the world which was able to perform the urinary assays, he spent his latter years developing the Home Ovarian Monitor. This system uses urine, was simple enough for women to measure their hormone production at home, and could be used by assisted reproduction clinics to maintain daily control of their treatments. As a final note, the quest for the equivalent of the phenomenon of oestrus in the human is now ended; it is contained in the concepts of the Basic Infertile Pattern (BIP), the oestrogen rise (ER) and the progesterone change (PC) which have come from the work of John and Lyn Billings.

== Accomplishments ==
Professor James Brown published more than 220 articles in scientific journals. He was runner up in 1970 as having made the most important contributions to endocrinology in the British Commonwealth. He was the recipient of the Senior Organon Prize in 1978 and with Harvard Colleagues won the 1986 Prix Antoine Lacassagne from Paris for the most important contribution to the study of breast cancer for that year

Brown retired from the university in 1985 and was accorded the title of emeritus professor. Nonetheless he continued to work in the field. He concentrated on simplifying the Ovarian Hormone Monitor, improving the effectiveness and acceptability of natural family planning and developing more effective methods of pregnancy achievement than IVF, for those couples who have sufficient numbers of sperm and no tubal problems.

He had established in 1962, a close working and personal relationship with Drs John and Lyn Billings who developed the concept of fertility recognition through the changes in cervical mucus secretion, forming the basis of Natural Family Planning. He validated their findings and continued to work closely with them especially in his latter years when he developed the Home Ovarian Monitor – a kit that can be easily used at home even by those without any laboratory training, to check their hormonal status. This was a quantum leap from his early methods where one fully trained worker could do only 10 assays per week. Working with the Billings, the availability, simplicity and low cost of this facility enabled him to study literally hundreds of thousands of cycles in women in various stages of their reproductive lives and develop a theory of ovarian function which takes account of these findings. More than 2000 women years of experience have been accumulated with the monitor using it for both pregnancy achievement and avoidance.

Right up to the time of his death Brown continued to work on various scientific projects and was involved with the World Health Organization's Special Programme of Research in Human Reproduction.

Perhaps his professional life could best be summed up by a closing editorial comment made in 2003 in response to a letter he had published in Fertility and Sterility, the Journal of the American Society for Reproductive Medicine:

"...In these days of hype, grossness and glitz, Dr Brown is a model of scientific practice who is even more imposing by the low profile that he has been able to keep over the last two decades. Perhaps these are the ideals and values for which we need to renew our subscription."

== Recognition ==
- 1958 American Cancer Society Fellowship
- 1970 Runner-up in award for having made the most important contribution in endocrinology in the British Commonwealth
- 1978 Senior Organon Prize (joint winner with Henry Burger)
- 1981 Lecture Laurentian Hormone Conference USA
- 1981 Fellow (Ad Eundem) Royal Australian and New Zealand College of Obstetricians and Gynaecologists
- 1986 Prix Antione Lacassagne, Paris, in conjunction with Harvard colleagues
- 2003 Member of the Order of Australia (AM) "for service to clinical research into women's health and reproductive issues and the development of the Home Ovarian Monitor".
- 1952 PhD Edinburgh;
- 1958 American Cancer Society Fellowship;
- 1961 Lecture, Laurentian Hormone Conference, USA;
- 1970 D.Sc. Edinburgh;
- 1971 Professor (personal chair) Department of Obstetrics and Gynaecology, University of Melboume;
- 1978 Senior Organon Prize (with Henry Burger);
- 1981 Fellow, Royal Australian College of Obstetricians and Gynaecologists ad eundum;
- 1983 Citation Classic, the seventh to be awarded to a worker in Melbourne; 1986 Professor-Emeritus, University of Melbourne,
- Life Member of the Australian Endocrine Society and of the Fertility Society of Australia.

== Publications ==
Approximately 230 publications in refereed scientific journals and chapters in books.
