= Edward Shillington (New Zealand) =

New Zealand librarian

Edward Shillington (1835–1920) was a New Zealand librarian. He was born in Belfast, County Antrim, Ireland in about 1835.
