= 1937 Auckland Rugby League season =

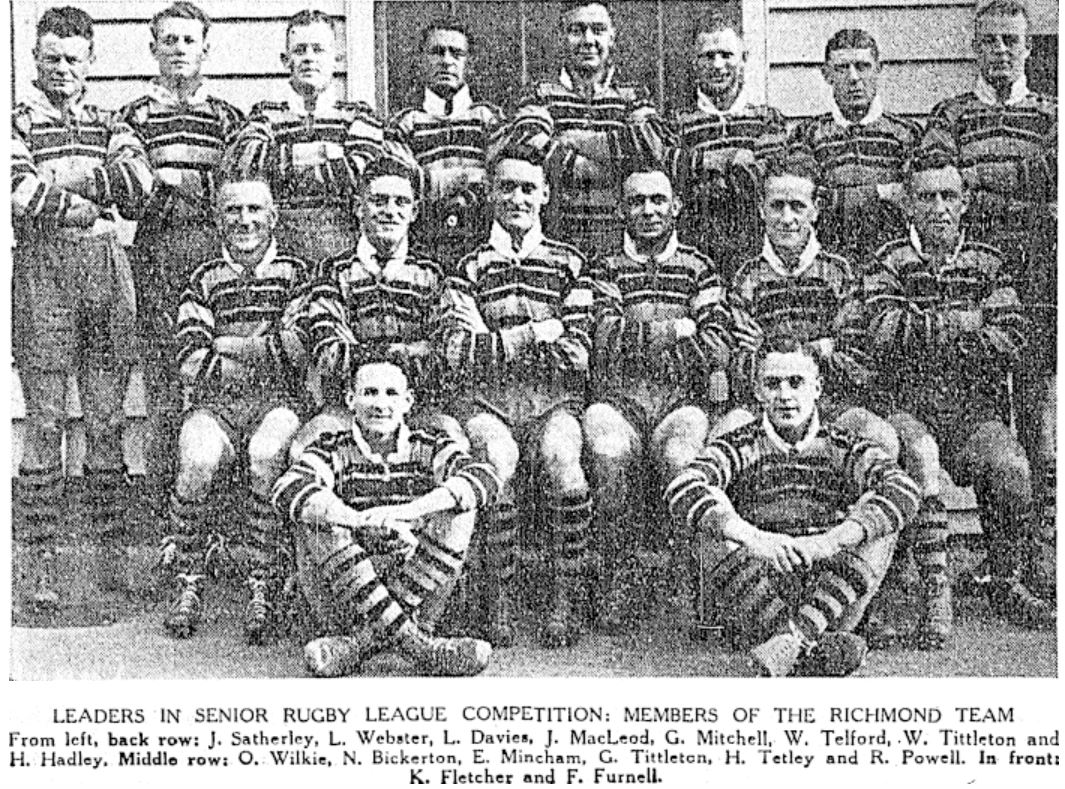
Richmond Rovers, winners of the championship for the third time.

The 1937 Auckland Rugby League season was its 29th. Richmond Rovers won their third Fox Memorial title with a 10 win, 1 draw, 3 loss record. At one point they threatened to run away with the title when after nine rounds they had a 4-point lead over their nearest challengers. However a loss to Ponsonby United in round 10, a draw with Manukau in round 12, and a loss to Marist Old Boys in round 13 meant that the title was not decided until the final round. They however beat the wooden spooners Newton Rangers 30–9 to secure the title.

After a disappointing 1936 season Marist Old Boys finished third in the Fox Memorial, one point behind Richmond and then went on to win the Roope Rooster knockout competition with wins over Newton Rangers, City Rovers, and Ponsonby United 25–10 in the final. They then defeated Richmond Rovers in the Stormont Shield champion of champions match 12–5. They were helped significantly by the record breaking point scoring of John Anderson. He scored 154 points through all matches for Marist during the season which was comfortably the most in Auckland Rugby League club history with only Bill Davidson (116) in 1922, and Frank Delgrosso (108) in 1929 even passing the 100 point mark.

North Shore Albions won the Phelan Shield after being knocked out of the Roope Rooster competition in the first round. They beat Richmond, Manukau and then Mount Albert in the final 22–18. Richmond won the reserve grade title (Norton Cup). Marist won the reserve grade knockout competition (Stallard Cup) by defeating Ponsonby 22–5 in the final.

The 9 team Senior B grade was won once again by Papakura who finished with a 14 win, 1 loss record to lead the trailing Point Chevalier who finished with 11 wins and 3 losses. Papakura also won the knockout competition when they defeated Green Lane 19–7 in the final.

The representative season saw Auckland beat Auckland Māori 24–14, followed by wins on the same day over South Auckland (Waikato) 26–12, and Taranaki (27–10), though two separate teams were obviously used. At the end of the season an injury depleted Auckland side lost to a very strong New Zealand Māori team 43–21. The New Zealand Māori side had earlier defeated the touring Australian side and included George Nēpia. The Auckland Māori side played two matches, aside from their game against Auckland, against Waikato Māori and North Auckland Māori. They won the matches 28-6 and 37-3 respectively.

Preceded by 1936	29th Auckland Rugby League season 1937	Succeeded by 1938

== Auckland Rugby League meetings and news ==
=== Club teams by grade participation ===
There were 104 club teams across 10 grades in the 1937 season.

Team	Fox Memorial	Senior Reserves	Senior B	3rd	4th	5th	6th	7th	Schoolboys	Total
Richmond Rovers	1	1	1	1	1	1	1	1	3	11
North Shore Albions	1	1	0	2	1	1	0	1	2	9
Mount Albert United	1	1	1	1	0	0	1	0	3	8
Newton Rangers	1	1	1	1	0	0	0	0	4	8
Point Chevalier	0	0	1	1	1	0	1	1	3	8
Manukau Rovers	1	1	1	1	0	0	0	0	3	7
Marist Old Boys	1	1	0	1	0	0	0	0	3	6
Ponsonby United	1	1	0	0	1	0	0	1	2	6
Northcote & Birkenhead Ramblers	0	0	1	0	1	1	0	0	3	6
Ellerslie United	0	0	0	1	1	1	0	0	3	6
City Rovers	1	1	0	1	0	1	1	0	0	5
Papakura	0	0	1	2	0	1	1	0	0	5
Otahuhu Rovers	0	0	0	1	0	1	0	1	1	4
Avondale	0	0	0	0	0	1	0	0	3	4
Green Lane	0	0	1	0	0	0	1	0	1	3
Glenora	0	0	0	1	1	0	0	1	0	3
RV	0	0	1	1	0	0	0	0	0	2
Balmoral	0	0	0	0	0	0	0	0	2	2
George Courts	0	0	0	0	0	0	0	0	2	2
Total	8	8	9	15	7	8	6	5	38	104

=== Annual general meeting ===
The 27th annual meeting was held on April 5 with John A. Lee speaking at length as president about the importance of sport for the health of men and women. He went on to say “you know I consider that all the defeats, or rather, disabilities, this code has had, and had overcome, have welded it strongly... we like the other game, and good fellows we know are playing it, but we think and know our game is better. In other words, we like the other game, Rugby Union, but we like our own game best. It may be an offshoot. I suppose it is a case of the juvenile being better than the parent (Applause). Anyhow, we think our game is improved, livened up, harder and faster, and it has a tempo more in keeping with our time...” The meeting made reference to the passing of John Stormont, A. Cowan, Dr. Tracy Inglis from the previous year. The balance sheet showed gate receipts for club matches were £3584 5/ which was an increase of £769 15/9 as compared to 1934, and £285 12/ compared with 1935. Grants made to clubs from gate percentages totalled £658 18/1, which was an increase of 20 percent over 1935. The following officers were elected:-patron, Mr. J. B. Donald; vice patron, Mr. J.F.W. Dickson; president, hon. John A. Lee; vice presidents, Messrs. E. Davis, R.D. Bagnall, R. Benson, J. Bellamy, O. Blackwood, J. Donald, C. Drysdale, H. Grange, R.J. Laird, W.J. Lovett, E. Morton, E. Montgomery, T.G. Symonds, Joe Sayegh, C. Seagar, F.W. Schramm, M.P., W. Wallace, H. Walmsley, R.H. Wood, G.T. Wright and H.W. Brien; trustees, Messrs. J.W. Probert and Jim Rukutai (re-elected), and T. Davis and F.T. McAneny as new members; junior delegate, Mr. D. Wilkie; referees delegate, Mr. W. Mincham. A Stormont was succeeding his father as a trustee.

The Board of Control met in early April with the chairman Mr. G. Grey Campbell welcoming new members Messrs. Davis and McAneny. Ivan Culpan and J.E. Knowling were re-elected honorary secretary and honorary treasurer respectively. Mr. R. Doble was re-elected delegate on the New Zealand Rugby League Council and Press steward; auditor, Mr. R.A. Spinley; honorary solicitor, Mr. H.M. Rogerson; honorary physicians, Drs. M.G. Pezaro, F.J. Gwynne, K.H. Holdgate, J.H. Waddell, G.W. Lock, H. Burrell, and S. Morris; honorary masseur, Mr. F. Flanagan: time keepers, Messrs. T. Hill, and A.E. Chapman. The following were appointed to committees:- Insurance, Messrs. Doble, Davis, and Wilkie; Accounts, Messrs. Knowling, J.W. Probert and F.T. McAneny; Emergency, chairman and any three members of the board. It was decided that the season would begin on April 17 when a preliminary round of two Saturdays will be started and a night match may be arranged with the championship officially opening on May 1. Senior team nominations would be dealt with on April 14.

=== Coronation dance ===
On May 11 the Auckland Rugby League held a Coronation dance at the Peter Pan venue. Over 800 people attended with music being supplied by Theo Walter's Band.

=== Auckland representative team ===
At the control board meeting on April 14 it was decided to appoint Hec Brisbane as the sole Auckland selector for the season. Brisbane was a former New Zealand international (50 matches including 10 tests), Auckland representative (14 matches from 1923 to 1933), and who had played for and captained Marist Old Boys from 1923 to 1934 in 156 matches.

=== Australian visit and St George request ===
In August the Australian side played two tests against New Zealand and another midweek match against New Zealand Māori. All three matches were played at Carlaw Park. New Zealand lost the first test 12–8, before winning the second test 16-15 while New Zealand Māori defeated Australia 16–5. Following the matches Ernie Asher, on behalf of the Māori Control Board presented the ARL committee with a framed photograph of the team. Chairman Mr. G. Grey Campbell “pointed out that the victory was a historic event in league history”. St. George cabled the ARL on September 2 requesting the opportunity to tour for three matches at some point on or after September 18 however the ARL regrettedly declined as it had been a long season and the national side had already played matches in Auckland. They had also offered to have Frank Burge the former international forward coach the Auckland team for two weeks whilst here.

=== First grade competition ===
The same teams as 1936 all nominated sides to compete in the Fox Memorial championship once again. The ARL decided to play two preliminary rounds in mid and late April before commencing the season proper on May 1. Prior to the opening round of preliminary games the Auckland Star wrote: Manukau, with a pack averaging over 14st per man, will include “Logan, the Central Hawke's Bay representative five eighths. Their challenge will be met confidently by Richmond, who recently teamed brilliantly in the trial at Morningside, where the new forwards, Jack McLeod, the Taranaki representative, and George Mitchell, of Wairarapa, were conspicuous. Ponsonby, now coached by R. McIntyre, the ex-Ponsonby and Auckland representative, are in the best of trim for their battle with Mount Albert, and the teams may provide a surprise or two. Newton will miss Ted Brimble, who is at present in hospital, but the back division will include their promising centre, Frederick Sissons, with Dempsey as custodian. The team is being coached by George Morman, who captained the Rangers when they won the championship in 1927... Marists will present a powerful vanguard against City. The Rovers will have the services of moody, a big Bay of Plenty forward from Taneatua, and Potier, the South Auckland representative halfback, among several other alterations. Three Navy players, Fitzgerald, at centre, and Donaldson and Boyle, forwards, will appear for the green and golds”. The New Zealand Herald reported that “Richmond will be considerably strengthened by A. E. Cooke, the international, who retired last season, but has decided to play again. Manukau will field practically the same side as that last year, Hemi, Pickrang, and Brodrick all being available. It is doubtful whether Trevarthan, who is at present in the south, will turn out”.

After the first weekend of preliminary games the New Zealand Herald wrote a lengthy article on the personnel in each side. Manukau fielded “the same team as that last year. Its forwards included Jack Brodrick, Len Kawe, George (Tiki) Whye, Angus Gault, and new players Phillips and Meredith, a hooker... Puti Tipene (Steve) Watene will again lead the team... however, he may play in the forwards”. Jack Hemi appeared to have recovered from his leg injury of late last season, while Shalfoon, a newcomer to the team, showed a fine burst of speed on the wing. Hollis is a rugged type of five-eighths, and should get plenty of opportunities from Peter Mahima, who will be the other halfback”. Other backs include Jack (Joe) Broughton, an ex-Wairarapa representative three quarter. Richmond would field Jack Satherley at hooker, with Bill Telford, Harold Tetley, and Alf Broadhead in the side with Maurice Metcalfe showing good form with Leo Davis being another promising forward. Noel Bickerton and Roy Powell would be in the halves once again.

Marist had promoted a promising junior, Phil Donovan who was clever on attack. Benny Crocker was new at half back with Bill Glover again at fullback. Reginald Haslam was again in the side, with Fitzgerald, Clive Murdoch, and John Bakalich in the backs. Their forwards would be made up of John Anderson, Bill Breed, Kenneth Finlayson, and McGreal, along with Boyle and Donaldson who had been with the navy ship H.M.S. Philomel. Mount Albert had appeared to be the fittest looking team after the preliminary matches and would have a strong forward pack. Clarrie Petersen, a Hawke's Bay forward who was with Mount Albert had transferred to Ponsonby with his place being filled by Cliff Satherley of Richmond. Martin Hansen had been promoted from the 3rd grade side and Des Herring, Richard Shadbolt, Noel Bickerton, and Charles Allen were all available. The backs would like be made up of Ray Halsey, Wilf Hassan, and the three Schultz brothers (Len, Bill, and John).

The City Rovers side had lost Lou Brown but had gained Joseph Hapi. J. Hutchinson had been promoted from 3rd grade while Lynch joined the side from Matamata. Other backs included William McLaughlin, Jack Tawhai, and Jackie Rata with Cyril Wiberg at fullback. The forwards would include Carl Spiro, Johnson, McCarthy, and Moody (a rugby recruit). Tai Raymond from Poverty Bay was in the forwards, while J. Webner from the Addington club in Christchurch had also joined the side. For North Shore Albions, Vaninovich and Ivor Stirling had joined the side and looked promising. Jack Smith was a promoted junior who was fast and clever. Len Scott and Verdun Scott would be on the wings with Cowan at halfback. The forwards would be light, but very experienced consisted of Hugh Simpson, Horace Hunt, Reg Hollows, E (Ted) Scott, Rogers, and Barnett.

Newton were said to be the weakest looking of all the sides and had not trained well. Claude Dempsey, Frederick Sissons, Pat Young, and Ted Brimble were all still in the side. The forwards would include Ellis, W Cairns, Proctor, Surtees, Beatty, and Joseph Ginders. Ponsonby would be fielding a young side. They were rumoured to be losing Brian Riley but he did ultimately play for them again. Miles was available at full back with Black at half back. Walter Stockley, Arthur Kay, Frank Halloran, and R.O. Jones were all said to be playing again. New forwards included Dan Keane, Blackman, and Eade.

=== Hawea Mataira and George Nēpia switch to rugby league ===
On June 8 it was reported in the New Zealand Herald that All Black and Hawke's Bay rugby representative Hawea Mataira was joining the City Rovers. He was a forward and had represented the All Blacks on their Australian tour in 1934. He also toured Australia with the Māori All Blacks in 1935 under the captaincy of George Nēpia.

=== Club visits to other centres ===
On June 19 six of the Auckland senior sides travelled throughout the North Island to play various local sides. Carlaw Park was unavailable that weekend as the ARL had made it available for the second soccer test match. Ponsonby travelled to Wellington, North Shore to Huntly, Mount Albert to New Plymouth, Marist to Whangarei, Manukau to Taneatua in the Bay of Plenty, and City to Tokaanu to play Taupo. The match between Taupo and City at Tokaanu was the first ever match of either oval ball code in the area. The referee A McIntosh has to explain the play the ball rule to the local side. After the game the City side was entertained at the local pa and it was said that the dinner provided "would be remembered by the players for a long time".

==== Travel round ====
19 June	St George (Wellington)	20-20	Ponsonby	Newtown Park, Wellington
3:00	Try: A O'Connor 2, C Mulholland 2, T Cook, Clarry McNeil; Pen: A Selwood		Try: Clarrie Petersen 2, Selwyn Davis, Brian Riley, Arthur Kay, Daniel Keane; Con: Daniel Keane	Referee: G Bell

19 June	Taranaki Combined	15-28	Mt Albert	Pukekura Park, New Plymouth
2:30	Try: William Lewis 2, J Fraser; Con: J Fraser 1/3; Pen: J Fraser 2		Try: J McCallum, John Schultz, Bert Leatherbarrow 2, Wilf Hassan, Joseph Gunning; Con: Basil Cranch 1/2, Alan Watkins 1/1, Cliff Satherley 2/2, L Schultz 1/1	Referee: H McGregor

19 June	Bay of Plenty	33-51	Manukau	Taneatua
3:00	Try: P Mio 2, R Blackie 2, Taikakoa 2, Kupai, Haki, McGarvey; Con: Unknown x3		Try: Rangi Chase 3, Tommy Chase 2, Jack Brodrick 2, Jack Hemi, Joe Broughton, Thomas Allen, unknown x1 Con: Jack Hemi 8 Pen: Jack Hemi

19 June	Huntly	5-23	North Shore	Huntly Domain, Huntly
3:00

19 June	Kamo	0-28 (0-10)	Marist	Jubilee Park, Whangarei
3:00			Try: Raymond McGreal 2, Kenneth Finlayson, Vincent Bakalich 2, Benny Crocker; Con: John Anderson 4 Drop: F McLaren	Referee: Hill

19 June	Taupō	23-35	City	Tokaanu, Taupō
3:00				Referee: A McIntosh

=== Senior B and second grades ===
At the annual meeting for the Papakura club Mr. A. Wilkie (chairman of the ARL Junior Board) said he “deplored the lack of good competition in the senior B grade last season...[and that] this had been the matter of serious consideration during the recess and the Junior Board had recommended to the Auckland league that the second grade be abolished. This would bring about ten teams into the senior B grade and tend to make the competition far more interesting in the coming season”. It was ultimately decided that the Senior B and 2nd Grades would be “amalgamated in order to increase competition between the open-weight grades”.

=== Carlaw trophy ===
Mr. Harold Walmsley donated a trophy in memory of James Carlaw which consisted of “inlaid New Zealand woods on three tiers with the pioneer administrator's photograph inset in the top square it is surmounted by goal posts and a silver football. The trophy was to be dedicated to the annual representative Pakeha – Māori match.

=== Carlaw Park ===
At the control board meeting on March 17 it was reported that further improvements of the terraces at Carlaw Park were being carried out “for the convenience of patrons”. The terraces were “bitumised during the summer months”. At the time of the opening round it was reported that the league proposed to pad the entire length of the picket fence along the side line which ran on the city side of the field to prevent injury. Following the round 3 matches the grounds committee reported that the No. 2 ground was in “bad condition, and it was desirable to give the area some relief if possible”. The control board decided to defer the allocation of the City v Newton, and Marist v Richmond round 4 matches. In mid October it was announced that Carlaw park was to see the installation of floodlighting with a tender having been accepted. Chairman Campbell said “the board has been considering the question of night football for some time past... and we desire to make the ground a more attractive centre where athletic sports, boxing, wrestling, band contests and other attractions may be staged to the best advantage”. The introduction of the lighting would mean that four steel towers would need to be erected to “carry the clusters of fittings for the lights”. The work would take about two months to complete but would not interfere with the use of the park for public gatherings.

At an October meeting of the control board Mr. Culpan reported that a special South African grass which had been recommended by Mr. P. W. Day, manager of the Springboks, “had already been tried with success at Carlaw Park. The new grass was proving efficacious on bad parts of the playing areas.

=== Devonport United becomes North Shore Albion once again ===
At their annual club meeting on March 17 there was discussion of the name of the Devonport United club. “Owing to the district restriction implied by the name “Devonport”, and the fact that the team was always called “Shore”, Mr. H. Mann was supported in a proposal for a reversion to the club's old name, North Shore Albion Rugby League Club”. The name of Devonport United had been adopted when North Shore Albions merged with the Sunnyside club many years earlier and the Sunnyside members refused to accept the name of North Shore. The motion to change the name back to North Shore Albions was adopted.

=== Otahuhu ground issues ===
In 1936 the Otahuhu Borough Council had controversially granted exclusive use of Sturges Park to the Otahuhu Rugby Club despite strong protests from Auckland Rugby League via multiple delegations to speak to the council. Then in 1937 when the issue was being revisited the Auckland Rugby League submitted a tender where they would pay £30 per annum, plus give 33.33% of gross takings on match days minus costs and guaranteed a minimum payment of £55 a season. They would play at least four senior A matches and 12 senior B matches there with other first class junior matches. The Otahuhu Rugby Club tender was the same as the previous year which was a 20 percent share of the gate with a guarantee to play 12 senior games. The council had anticipated this would net £75 the previous year but it had not and the poor weather was said to be to blame. The council who included Mayor Charles Robert Petrie and was in fact the Otahuhu RL club's patron, heard the tenders and then spent 15 minutes in special committee before deciding that they “had no option but to renew the lease with the rugby union according to last year's agreement” with legal advice confirming this opinion. Sturges Park was then leased to the Rugby Union for a period of five years.

=== State of Grey Lynn Park ===
In late July Northcote and Birkenhead complained in a letter to the ARL about the state of Grey Lynn Park after arriving to play Richmond. The letter said that they had feared they had arrived at the wrong place and instead had arrived in an area “reputed for bovine aromas and mudflats”. It was said to be “a sea of mud, eight or nine inches deep in some places, and the smell had to be experienced to be appreciated”. The letter went on to say that they “hoped that no further games be allotted to Grey Lynn Park until the city fathers install a drainage system”. The league decided not to arrange for any more matches at the park until it was in a proper condition for play.

== Senior grade competitions ==
Following round 9 the ARL decided to rework the draw because Richmond was comfortably first (by four points with five matches to play) and they may be able to conclude the competition early.

At the ARL meeting on October 6 Wally Tittleton of the Richmond club was announced as being awarded a special trophy for the outstanding senior grade player. The award was made by the donor Mr. J.F.W. Dickson and was for consistently good play throughout the season. Tittleton had also won selection for Auckland and New Zealand during the year.

President of New Zealand Rugby League, Cyril Snedden donated a special trophy to John Anderson who registered a total of 148 points (or 154 according to the other report) and E. Bennett of Takapuna gave Jack Smith a trophy for scoring 132 points. It was said in an article later that he had scored 162 points. Though this would likely also include Auckland matches.

=== Senior A grade fixtures ===
==== Preliminary round 1 ====
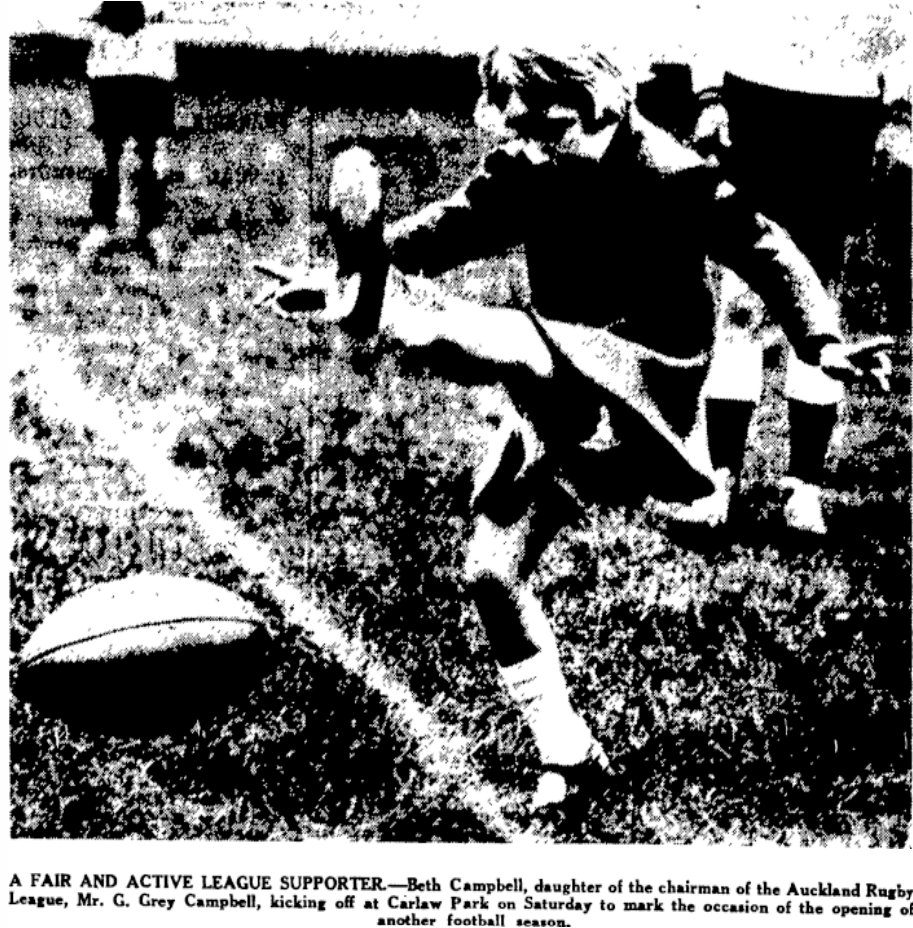
Beth Campbell, the daughter of Auckland Rugby League chairman, C. Grey Campbell kicking off the round.

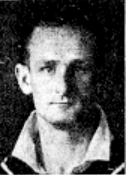
Jack Smith on debut for North Shore

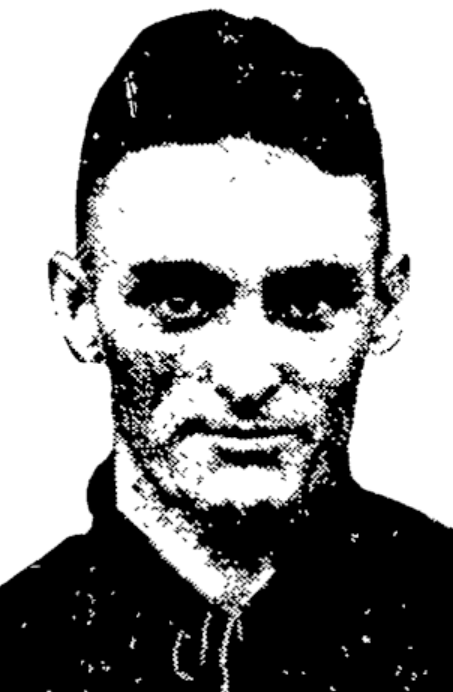
Ted Mincham scored three tries for Richmond.

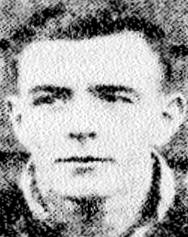
Wilf Hassan returned to Mt Albert after a year in retirement. He was the former New Zealand diving champion in 1934 and 1935.

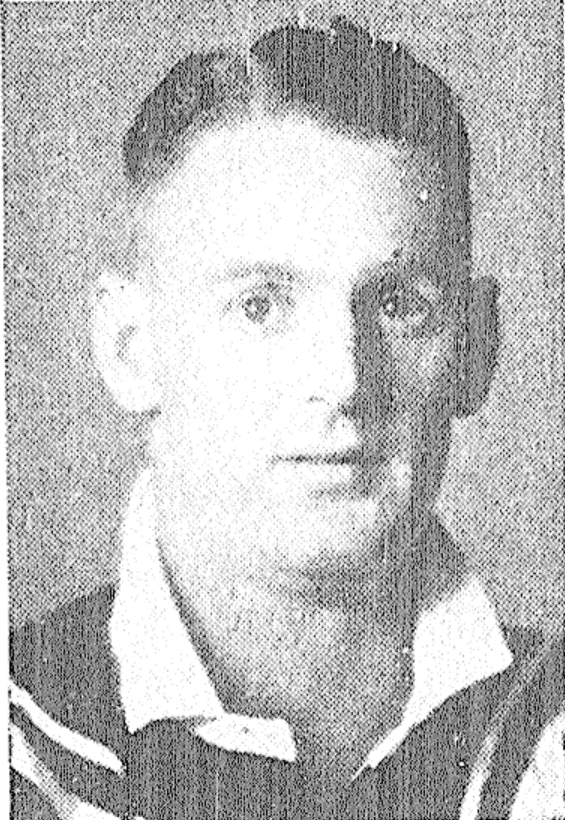
Ivor Stirling debuted for North Shore.

Ponsonby were being coached by R. McIntyre a former player while Newton's coach was George Morman who captained the side when they won the 1927 championship. Ted Brimble was unavailable as he was in hospital. Jack McLeod had moved to Auckland from Taranaki and made his debut for Richmond. He was selected for New Zealand later in the season. Manukau could have beaten Richmond but made a lot of changes at halftime including taking off their captain, Steve Watene and moving Jack Hemi to fullback. Hemi kicked a 40-yard drop goal in the first half which "thrilled the crowd" and then in the second half he kicked another from near halfway. They brought on Logan a five eighth rugby representative from the central Hawkes Bay. Manukau had lost the services of hooker Jack Rutherford and loose forward Frank Pickrang, who had transferred to Ponsonby. They were also without five eighth Thomas Travathan who had left Auckland. Ted Mincham was outstanding for Richmond scoring all three of their tries while George Tittleton kicked brilliantly. They also fielded George Mitchell who had come from the Wairarapa in the forwards. He had represented Manawhenua and Manawatu and was the brother of Alf Mitchell who was Kiwi 238 but had fallen out with the club selectors and had played his final game the previous season before moving to Wellington to live. Wilf Hassan made a reappearance for Mt Albert after a year in retirement. Cliff Satherley from Richmond had joined the Mt Albert forward pack, while Clarrie Petersen had transferred to Ponsonby. Martin Hansen, a junior forward for Mt Albert had been promoted to the top side and looked promising. For North Shore in their easy 34–8 win over Newton, Jack Smith made his debut at centre and became a New Zealand representative the following year. Teammate Ivor Stirling also debuted and was selected in the New Zealand side to tour England in 1939. For Newton, halfback Wilfred Brimble "was splendid" though their hooker Joseph Ginders "mishandled badly" and after he went off at halftime his replacement Donald Fraser "looked a possibility" but went off with a twisted ankle. Gordon Midgley debuted for Marist, coming on in the second half of their win on the wing. John Anderson, Marists fast loose forward was up against a fellow former South Island player in Leslie Wehner. City who were captained by the versatile William McLaughin who had debuted for the side in 1927, lost Carl Spiro through injury. City suffered a huge loss with Lou Brown who had led the league in tries scored the previous season resuming his professional career after moving to France to play for Bordeaux.

17 April	Richmond	15-11	Manukau	Carlaw Park 1
3:00	Try: Ted Mincham 3 Con: George Tittleton 3		Try: Angus Gault; Con: Jack Hemi; Pen: Puti Tipene Watene; Drop: Jack Hemi 2	Referee: Maurice Wetherill

17 April	Mount Albert	21-10	Ponsonby	Carlaw Park 1
1:30	Try: Alan Watkins 2, Cliff Satherley, Richard Shadbolt, Martin Hansen; Con: Cliff Satherley 2 Pen: Cliff Satherley		Try: N McKinney, D.G. Black; Con: R.O. Jones 2	Referee: Jack Hawkes

17 April	Marist	27-22	City	Carlaw Park 2
3:00	Try: Unknown		Try: Unknown	Referee: Percy Rogers

17 April	North Shore	34-8	Newton	Carlaw Park 2
1:30	Try: Jack Smith 1, Unknown 7 Con: Jack Smith 5		Try: Unknown	Referee: L Kelly

==== Preliminary round 2 ====
Bert Schultz of Mount Albert fractured his leg in their match with City. Donald Fraser, a 19 year old Newton player who had debuted the week before was concussed and was also taken to Auckland Hospital. North Shore led Marist 12–3 at halftime before Marist took a 15–14 lead with ten minutes to go but Len Scott sprinted 40 yards for a try which was converted and then he scored another "opportunist" try which he was famous for which sealed their victory. Bert Cooke led Richmond well at fullback. Their loose forward Alf Broadhead was outstanding scoring three tries. Mt Albert and City drew 11 all. With time almost up Cliff Satherley took a penalty shot from the halfway line which hit the cross bar and rebounded into the field.

24 April	Richmond	17-10	Ponsonby	Carlaw Park 1
1:30	Try: Alf Broadhead 3, Jack Greenwood, George Tittleton; Pen: Noel Bickerton		Try: Clarrie Peterson, Daniel Keane; Con: R.O. Jones; Pen: R.O. Jones	Referee: Owen Chalmers

24 April	North Shore	24-15	Marist	Carlaw Park 1
3:00	Try: Len Scott 2, Horace Hunt, Barnett; Con: Jack Smith, Verdun Scott 2 Pen: Jack Smith 3		Try: Donaldson, Clive Murdoch, Vincent Bakalich; Con: John Anderson; Pen: John Anderson 2	Referee: Frank Thompson

24 April	Mount Albert	11-11	City	Carlaw Park 2
1:30	Try: Richard Shadbolt, William McCallum 2 Con: Cliff Satherley		Try: William McLaughlin; Con: Cyril Wiberg; Pen: Cyril Wiberg 3	Referee: D Taylor

24 April	Manukau	37-19	Newton	Carlaw Park 2
3:00	Try: Jack Brodrick 3, Jack Hemi 2, Logan 2, Joe Broughton, Len Kawe; Con: Jack Hemi 5		Try: Pat Young 2, Joseph Ginders, Beattie, C Cairns; Con: C Cairns; Pen: C Cairns	Referee: Stuart Billman

=== Fox Memorial standings ===
Team	Pld	W	D	L	F	A	Pts
Richmond Rovers	14	10	1	3	266	156	21
Mount Albert United	14	10	0	4	219	124	20
Marist Old Boys	14	10	0	4	228	184	20
Manukau	14	7	2	5	233	184	16
Ponsonby United	14	7	1	6	177	151	15
North Shore Albions	14	4	1	9	148	220	9
City Rovers	14	3	1	10	142	221	7
Newton Rangers	14	2	0	12	114	287	4

=== Fox Memorial results ===
==== Round 1 ====
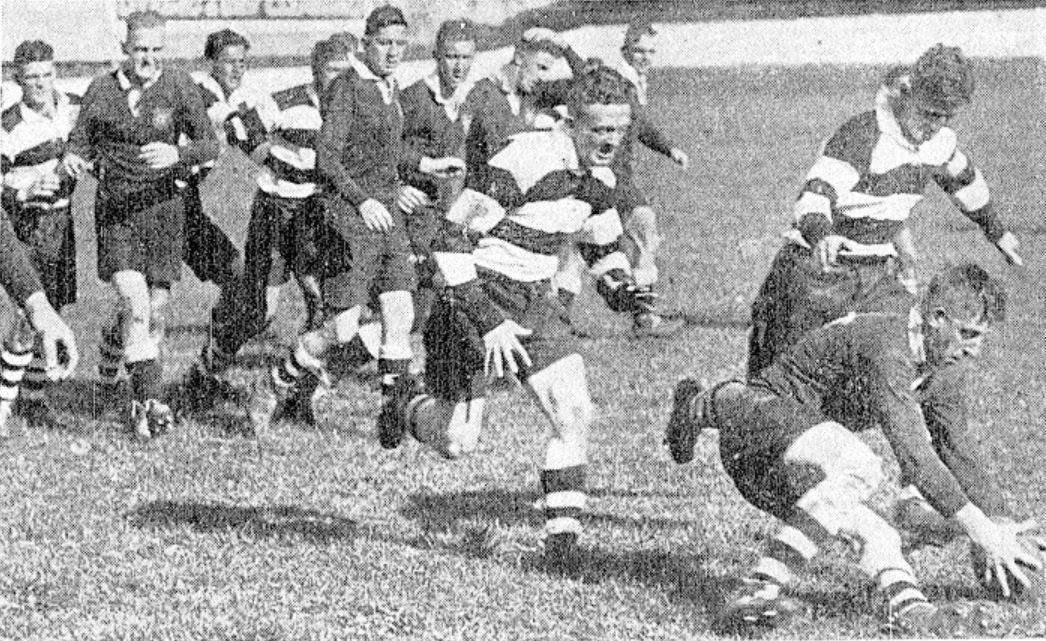
J.C. Cowan of North Shore dropping on the ball with Phillips and Meredith of Manukau coming behind. Angus Gault (Manukau) is on the extreme left.

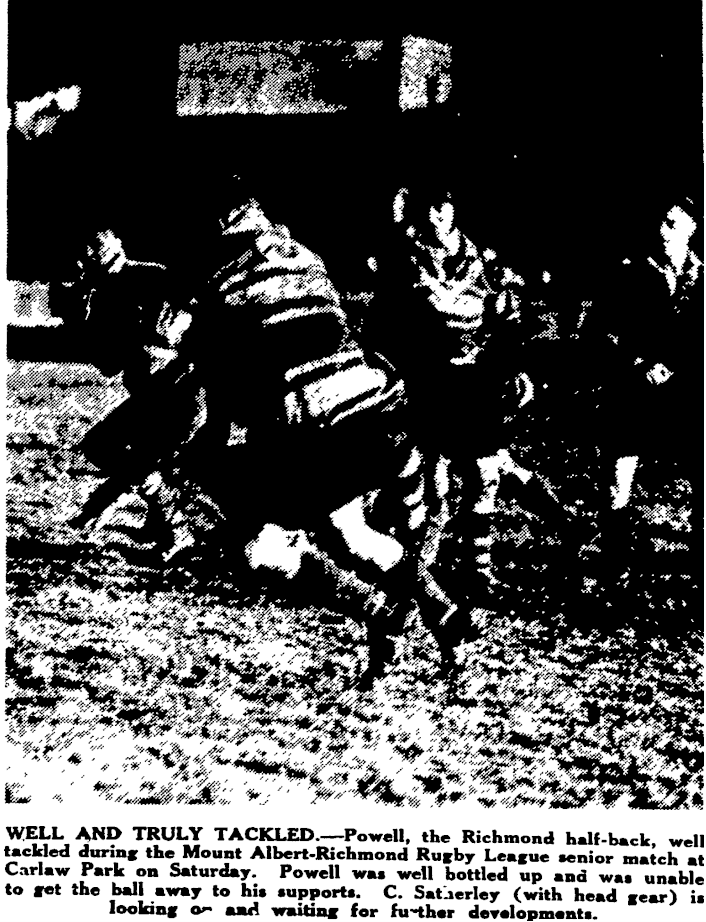
Roy Powell, Richmond's halfback being tackled. Mount Albert's Cliff Satherley is in the headgear watching play in a match against his former side.

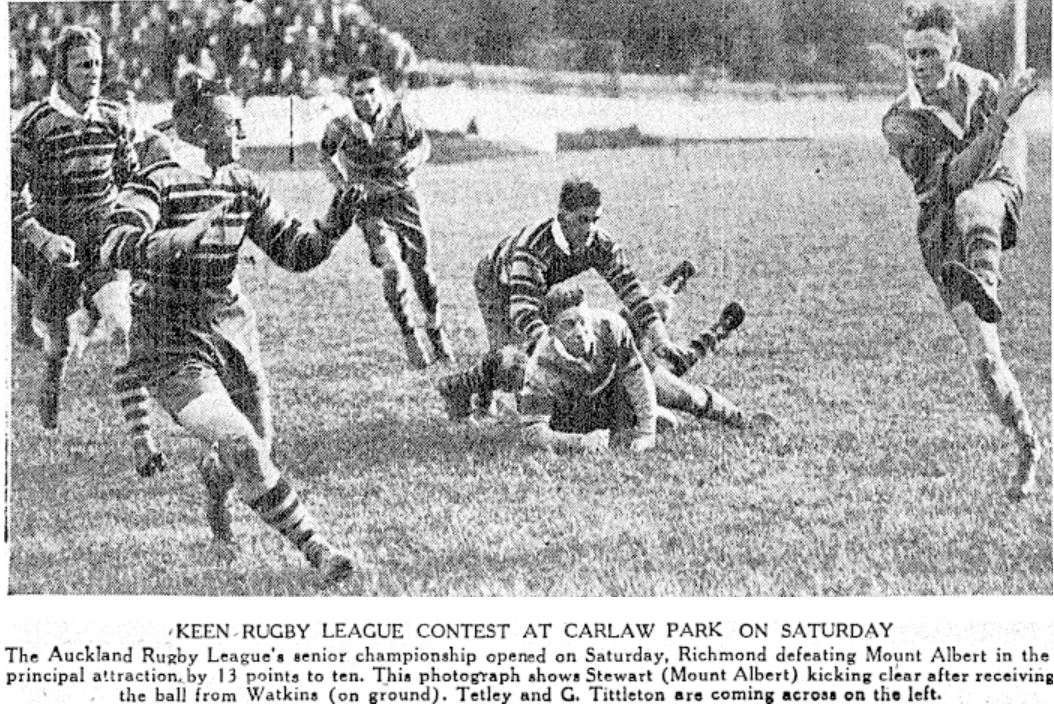
Stewart (Mt Albert) kicking after halfback Alan Watkins had passed him the ball. Coming across for Richmond with hands raised is George Tittleton, with Harold Tetley behind him.

Bert Cooke played and was said to be “superlative” however he was late tackled and was limping at the end of the game. This was to be his last ever rugby league appearance. He began coaching the North Shore rugby senior side for the remainder of the year. George Mitchell in his debut season was outstanding in the Richmond forwards scoring two tries. Manukau trailed North Shore 12–4 at halftime but finished much stronger scoring 15 unanswered points in the second half. Jack Brodrick who was usually a loose forward played on the wing for Manukau and the team erred by trying to take play his way too often. Angus Gault lost a try when he crossed but was pushed over the dead-ball line. Peter Mahima their halfback combined well with Walter Brimble and Jack Hemi in the five eighths positions. Thomas (Tom) Tawhanga Rickit debuted for Manukau in the forwards. He was accidentally killed in Syria on May 13, 1942, during World War 2. Roy Nurse played well on the wing for Ponsonby in his debut season. He would go on to represent New Zealand after World War 2. Arthur Kay scored three tries for Ponsonby playing at centre but was otherwise said to have played poorly, with "faulty" handling and passing to his supports much too early before drawing in the defenders. Cyril Wiberg played a "fine" game at fullback for City and was their best back. Leslie Wehner debuted for City and scored a try. He had transferred from Christchurch where he had played for the Addington club and was a South Island representative. Gordon Midgley who had recently made his senior debut for Marist scored two tries on the wing and showed a lot of pace. Midgley was one of the top junior runners in Auckland in the early to mid 1930s in events ranging from 100 yards to 880 yards regularly finishing in the top few positions in Auckland races.

1 May	Richmond	13-10	Mount Albert	Carlaw Park 1
3:00	Try: George Mitchell 2, George Tittleton; Con: George Tittleton; Pen: Ted Mincham		Try: Joseph Gunning, Stewart; Con: Basil Cranch; Pen: Cliff Satherley	Referee: Maurice Wetherill

1 May	Manukau	19-12	North Shore	Carlaw Park 1
1:30	Try: Jack Brodrick, Joe Broughton, Colin Murton; Con: Steve Watene; Pen: Jack Hemi 3 Drop: Jack Hemi 3		Try: Jack Zane-Zaninovich 2 Con: Jack Smith 2 Pen: Jack Smith	Referee: Percy Rogers

1 May	Ponsonby	21-9	City	Carlaw Park 2
3:00	Try: Arthur Kay 3, Roy Nurse 2, Ray Middleton, T Rush		Try: Leslie Wehner; Con: Cyril Wiberg; Pen: Cyril Wiberg 2	Referee: Owen Chalmers

1 May	Marist	27-10	Newton	Carlaw Park 2
1:30	Try: John Anderson 2, Gordon Midgley 2, Phil Donovan, Raymond McGreal, Benny Crocker; Con: John Anderson 3		Try: Claude Dempsey, Fredrick Sissons; Pen: Beattie	Referee: Roy Otto

==== Round 2 ====
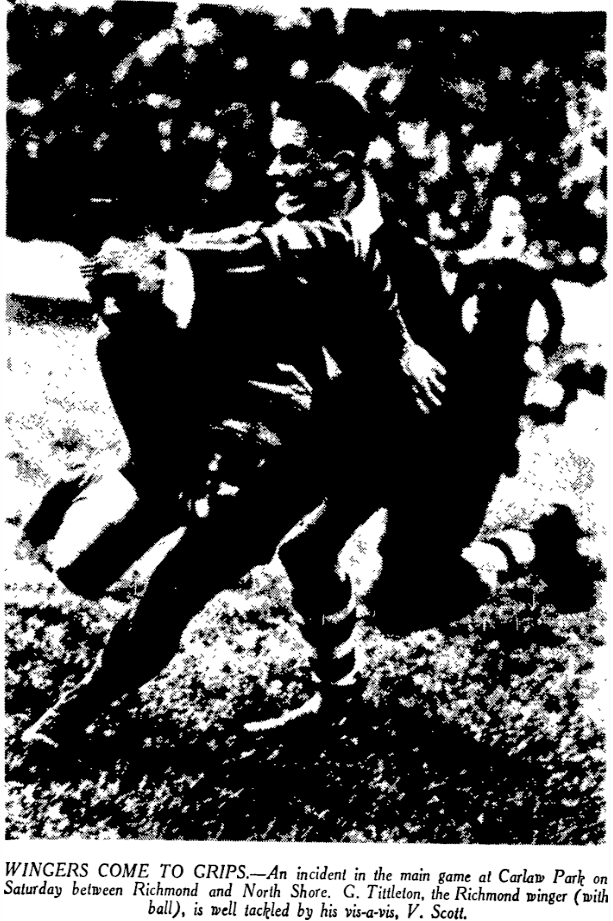
George Tittleton (Richmond) tackled by Verdun Scott (North Shore).

Frank Thompson refereed his 50th 1st grade match when he had control of the Mt Albert - City match. He became the seventh referee to achieve this feat.

8 May	North Shore	15-13	Richmond	Carlaw Park 1
3:00	Try: Tony Milicich, Horace Hunt, Reg Hollows; Con: Jack Smith 2 Pen: Jack Smith		Try: Noel Bickerton, Owen Wilkie, George Mitchell; Con: George Tittleton, Ted Mincham	Referee: Percy Rogers

8 May	Manukau	17-10	Marist	Carlaw Park 1
1:30	Try: Colin Murton 2, Jack Hemi; Con: Jack Hemi, Steve Watene; Pen: Jack Hemi, Steve Watene		Try: Donovan, Bill Breed; Con: John Anderson 2	Referee: Maurice Wetherill

8 May	Ponsonby	27-0	Newton	Carlaw Park 2
3:00	Try: Edgar Morgan 2, Arthur Kay 2, R.O. Jones, N McKinney, Clarrie Petersen; Con: Ray Middleton 2, Oakley Browne			Referee: G Kelly

8 May	Mount Albert	22-15	City	Carlaw Park 2
1:30	Try: William McCullum 2, Bert Leatherbarrow 2, Martin Hanson, Charles Allen; Con: Basil Cranch 2		Try: Jackie Rata, Jack Tawhai, Arnold Porteous; Con: Cyril Wiberg; Pen: Cyril Wiberg 2	Referee: Frank Thompson

==== Round 3 ====
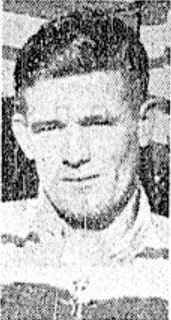
Frank Halloran the Ponsonby halfback/five eighth, formerly of Northcote and Birkenhead Ramblers (Northcote Tigers).

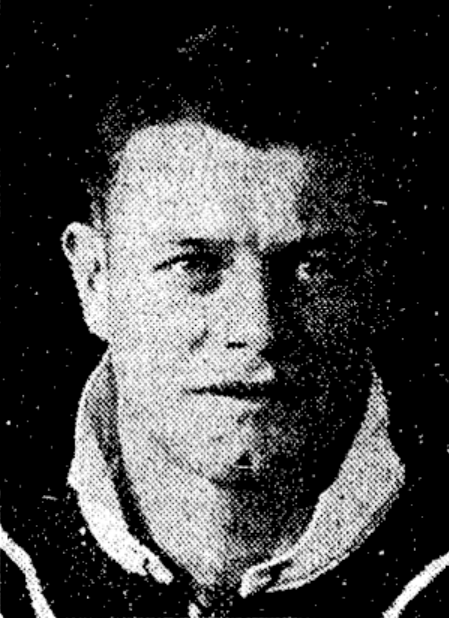
Jack Satherley hooked well for Richmond.

A week after Frank Thompson achieved the feat, Wilfred Simpson became the eighth Auckland Rugby League referee to referee 50 matches between first grade sides when Richmond played City. Carlaw Park was in a terrible state with players said to be sinking several inches into the mud on both fields. For North Shore a former Manukau junior, Jack Zane-Zaninovich scored the winning try on full time. Bill Glover, the normal Marist fullback played at first five eighth with a promoted junior, McLennan playing well at fullback, Marist had led 5–3 at halftime before North Shore's late try. Ponsonby used superior tactics in the conditions to beat Manukau. They kept the ball in close and kicked it along the ground a lot forcing many mistakes from the Manukau backs who tried to handle the ball too much. Frank Halloran who became Kiwi 250 later in the year at halfback was played at first five eighth again with the promising D.G. Black at halfback. Halloran and Walter Stockley at second five eighth struggled in the conditions and were said to be too slow passing the ball out. For Richmond, Jack Satherley hooked outstandingly in their 24–6 win over City. City's best back was Cyril Wiberg at fullback while Jackie Rata and Jack Tawhai attacked well for the losing side. The Mt Albert game with Newton was played on the number 2 field and Newton was unable to score a point. Their fullback, Frederick Hollis who had only recently joined the side was taken to hospital with a head injury. During the week Mt Albert signed Jack Tristram, a 13.5 stone second row rugby player from the Frankton club in Hamilton who had represented Waikato and was an All Black trialist in 1936. He went on to play five seasons for Mt Albert and represented Auckland in 1941.

15 May	Ponsonby	7-3	Manukau	Carlaw Park 1
3:00	Try: Ray Middleton; Con: R.O. Jones; Pen: R.O. Jones		Try: Peter Mahima	Referee: Maurice Wetherill

15 May	North Shore	6-5	Marist	Carlaw Park 1
1:30	Try: Jack Smith, Jack Zane-Zaninovich		Try: Donaldson; Con: John Anderson	Referee: Stuart Billman

15 May	Richmond	24-6	City	Carlaw Park 2
3:00	Try: Ted Mincham 2, Bill Telford, Wally Tittleton, Hermes Hadley, Noel Bickerton; Con: Ted Mincham, George Tittleton 2		Try: Tai Raymond, J McCarthy	Referee: Wilfred Simpson

15 May	Mount Albert	11-0	Newton	Carlaw Park 2
1:30	Try: Wilf Hassan, Stewart, Alan Watkins; Pen: Basil Cranch			Referee: Percy Rogers

==== Round 4 ====
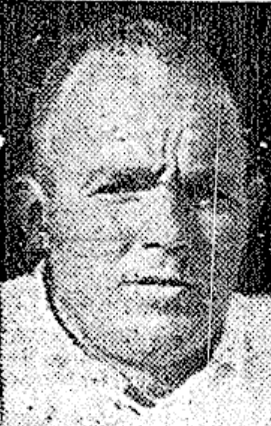
George Kerr the North Shore fullback who kicked a drop goal in their 8–8 draw with Ponsonby

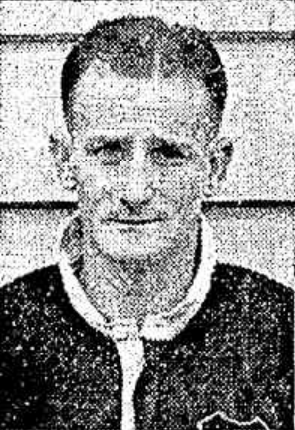
Jack Smith of North Shore

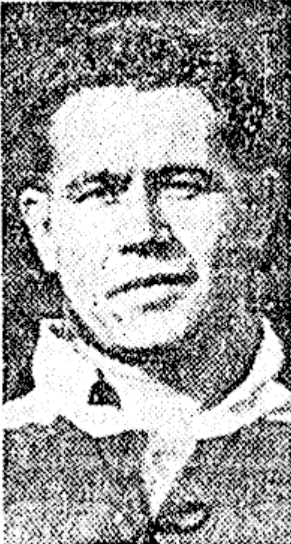
Jack Tristram former Waikato rugby representative debuted for Mount Albert. He was selected for New Zealand Māori later in the season

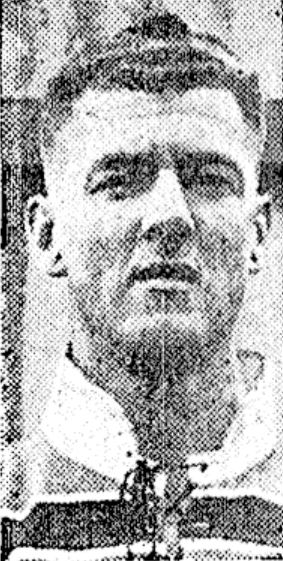
Edgar Morgan (Ponsonby)

The City v Newton match was originally supposed to be played at Carlaw Park but after the number 2 field was declared in a poor state the match was moved to the Glen Eden Recreation Ground in Glen Eden in West Auckland where the Glenora club was based. A "good crowd" witnessed City winning 14–0. For City, former Wesley College student Jack Tawhai scored twice with one a "meteoric swerving run from halfway" being the highlight of the match. Ted Brimble who was making his first appearance of the season, and his younger brother Wilfred Brimble along with Pat Young played well in the inside backs, especially in the first half when Newton was the better side but they were unable to finish movements. It was the third consecutive game where Newton had failed to score a single point. Former New Zealand fullback, Claude Dempsey played a solid game on attack and defense for Newton in his regular position. At Carlaw Park in the main match North Shore drew with Ponsonby 8–8 with all of North Shore's points coming from kicks including three penalties by 19 year old Jack Smith and a drop goal by fullback George Kerr. Smith would go on to be an outstanding record point scorer for North Shore and represent New Zealand on 11 occasions. Arthur Kay was unable to play for Ponsonby due to an injury and his place at centre was taken by R.O. Jones who played well often beating the defence and defending solidly. D.G. Black at halfback played a "rattling good game", opening up play, making solo efforts, and opening up play for his wingers on the blindside. Clarrie Petersen was the best of the Ponsonby forwards though the New Zealand Herald wrote that "there is no better all-round forward in the Auckland competition than Edgar Morgan. "A very heady player, he was everywhere... he often started movements with the ability of a back, followed up and tackled splendidly while being a tower of strength on defence". Reg Hollows "was the pick of the Shore sextet". Horace Hunt was also playing well until forced from the field with an injury. Mt Albert played an excellent game against last seasons champions Manukau with Richard (Dick) Shadbolt scoring three tries with the last after he "kept pace" with the backs when backing up. He debuted at this level in 1935 and was still playing senior football for them in 1945. Jack Tristram debuted for Mt Albert after his move from Waikato rugby and "proved himself a grafter in his first league game". For Manukau Peter Mahima, Jack Hemi, and Joe Broughton were the best backs. Steve Watene arrived at the ground late and did not take the field until the second half but even his captaincy failed to "rally the side". In Marists heavy 55–15 defeat to Richmond on Carlaw Park number 2 they lost Bill Glover and Gordon Midgley to injury and played most of the second half with 11 players. The Auckland Star joking wrote that "the boy who had the job of hoisting the scores... had a very busy day". For Richmond George Mitchell scored three tries, while Jack McLeod scored two, as did Noel Bickerton, and Harold Tetley. The Richmond forwards actually scored nine of their 13 tries. George Tittleton and Ted Mincham each kicked four conversions. In a bizarre moment Owen Wilkie was going in to score a try for Richmond but decided to pass back to the supporting Roy Powell. Instead of placing the ball down he passed it back to Wilkie in an offside position and referee Maurice Wetherill a former New Zealand international ruled a goal line drop out. Law 21 stated that "in case of any law being infringed in in-goal by the attacking side, a touch-down shall be allowed, but where such breach is committed by the defending side, a scrum shall be ordered five yards from the goal-line...". Going by this law the try should have stood.

22 May	Ponsonby	8-8	North Shore	Carlaw Park 1
3:00	Try: Frank Halloran, Roy Nurse; Con: R.O. Jones		Pen: Jack Smith 3 Drop: George Kerr	Referee: Percy Rogers

22 May	Mount Albert	20-4	Manukau	Carlaw Park 1
1:30	Try: Richard Shadbolt 3, Len Schultz; Con: Cliff Satherley 3 Pen: Cliff Satherley		Pen: Jack Hemi 2	Referee: Wilfred Simpson

22 May	Richmond	55-15	Marist	Carlaw Park 2
3:00	Try: George Mitchell 3, Jack McLeod 2, Harold Tetley 2, Noel Bickerton 2, Hermes Hadley, Owen Wilkie, Leo Davis, Ted Mincham; Con: Ted Mincham 4, George Tittleton 4		Try: Kenneth Finlayson, F McLaren, Raymond McGreal; Con: John Anderson; Pen: John Anderson 2	Referee: Maurice Wetherill

22 May	City	14-0	Newton	Glen Eden Recreation Ground, Glen Eden
3:00	Try: Jack Tawhai 2, Joseph Hapi, T McCarthy; Con: Cyril Wiberg			Referee: Roy Otto

==== Round 5 ====
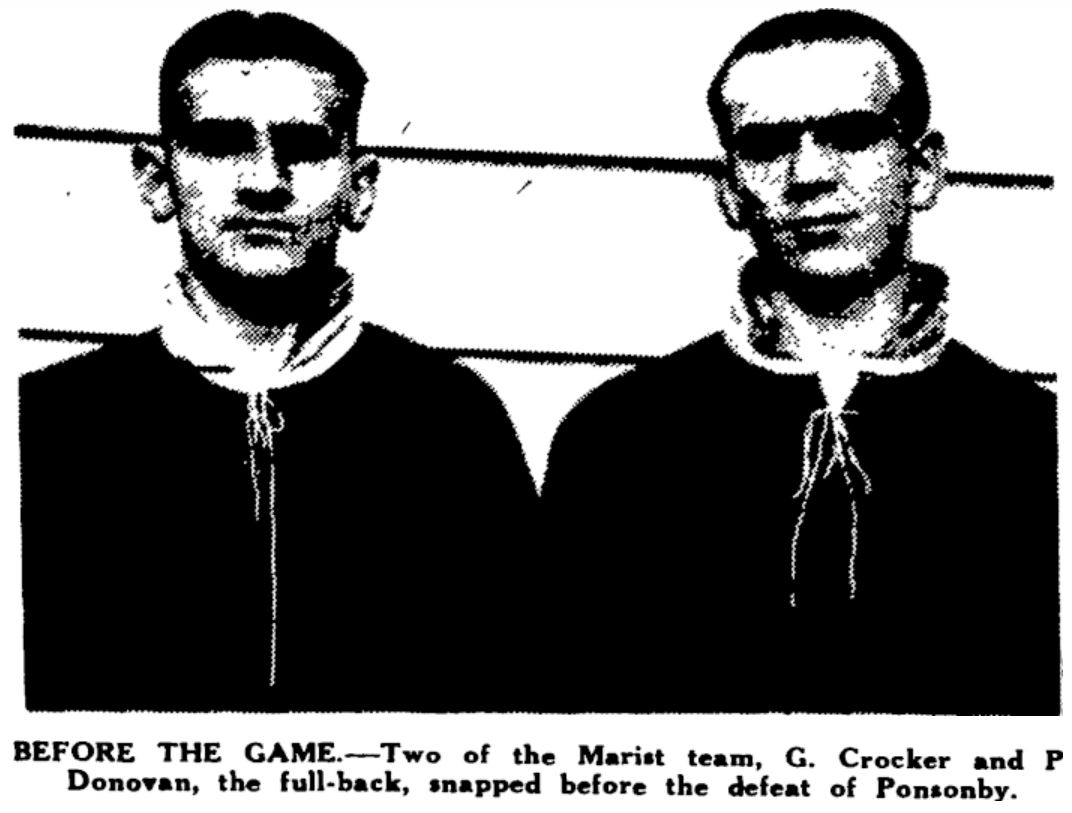
Benny Crocker and Phil Donovan of Marist, before their win over Ponsonby. Donovan was killed in action in Italy in early 1945.

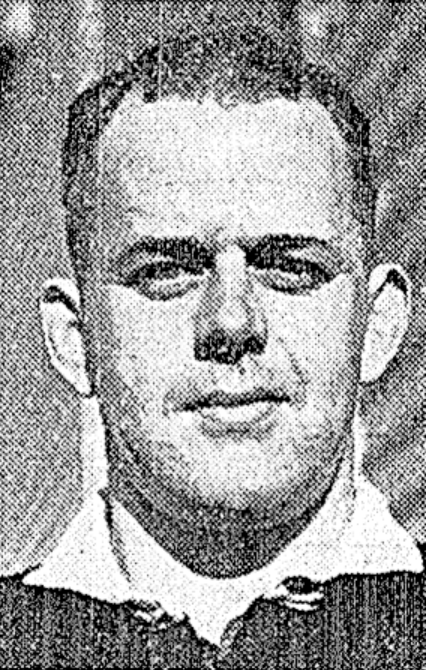
Bert Leatherbarrow (Mt Albert hooker)

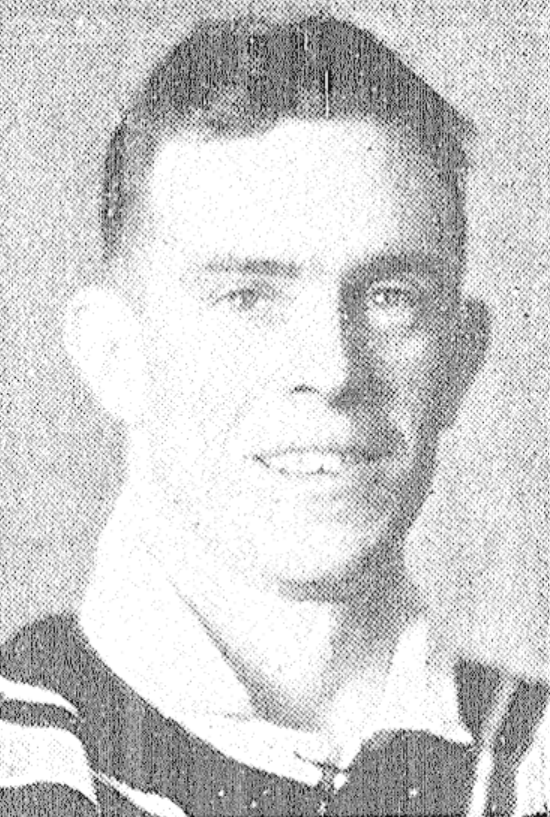
Ivor Stirling (North Shore)

The match between Richmond and Newton was played at Fowld's Park to raise money for the King George V. Memorial Fund. The game was ceremonially kicked off by the Mayor of Mount Albert, Mr. Henry Albert Anderson. The ground was in a "wretched state" and "heavy in places". Newton threatened an upset when they led 6–5 at halftime. For Richmond George Mitchell was "outstanding" in their forwards. The Newton backs, Wilfred Brimble, Ted Brimble, and Pat Young "played very cleverly" while Maurice Quirke hooked very well for them in his first game of the season. He had debuted for Newton in 1933 and his final year with them was 1942 before he spent 1943 with Mt Albert. With the wins to Richmond and Mt Albert it meant they both moved to the top of the standings. For Mt Albert in their 13–0 win over North Shore their captain, Len Schultz scored two "fine tries" and "paved the way for another". Future New Zealand hooker Bert Leatherbarrow hooked successfully giving Mt Albert most of the ball from the scrums. J.C. Cowan made a reappearance for North Shore at halfback with Ivor Stirling moving out to first five eighth where he "detracted from an otherwise good performance by too frequently kicking". The Herald said that if he "showed a little more judgment in placing his kicks" he should go on to higher honours. He was "quick off the mark, a straight runner with the ability to vary his play". Two years later Stirling was selected for the New Zealand tour of England. North Shore was missing winger Len Scott who was injured with Bennetts doing well in his place. The game between Ponsonby and Marist was played on a heavy ground. Reginald Haslam of Marist was a key figure in their win. He had been out injured and was in the reserves for his comeback and then came on to replace Phil Donovan who was injured and "at once took a big part in both the attack and defence". Both teams were said to have suffered "an extraordinary crop of minor casualties" and at one stage four players were on the sideline receiving treatment. In the second half Ponsonby winger N. McKinney was sent off for disputing a refereeing decision. Manukau led City by five points with ten minutes to go but a late rally by City saw them draw the match 13-13. City dominated the game territorially but did not take their opportunities. They played Leslie Wehner the former Canterbury forward at hooker and he "gave a promising display". Jack Hemi played at fullback for Manukau after playing in the five eighths recently while his opposing fullback, Cyril Wiberg played a very food game fielding and kicking "splendidly". Peter Mahima, the Manukau halfback "opened the game up for his supports at every opportunity" and teamed well with Walter Brimble who "made some splendid openings".

29 May	Mount Albert	13-0	North Shore	Carlaw Park 1
3:00	Try: Len Schultz 2, Des Herring; Con: Cliff Satherley 2			Referee: Maurice Wetherill

29 May	Manukau	13-13	City	Carlaw Park 1
1:30	Try: Walter Brimble, Tom Rickit, Jack Brodrick; Con: Steve Watene; Pen: Jack Hemi		Try: William McLaughlin 2, J Hutchinson; Con: Cyril Wiberg; Pen: Cyril Wiberg	Referee: Owen Chalmers

29 May	Marist	20-5	Ponsonby	Carlaw Park 2
1:30	Try: Clive Murdoch, Raymond McGreal, Ray Halsey, Benny Crocker; Con: John Anderson 4		Try: Arthur Kay; Con: Walter Stockley	Referee: Percy Rogers

29 May	Richmond	14-9	Newton	Fowld's Park, Morningside
3:00	Try: Owen Wilkie 2, George Tittleton, Hermes Hadley; Pen: George Tittleton		Try: Fredrick Sissons, Wilfred Brimble, Henry Crook	Referee: Frank Thompson

==== Round 6 ====
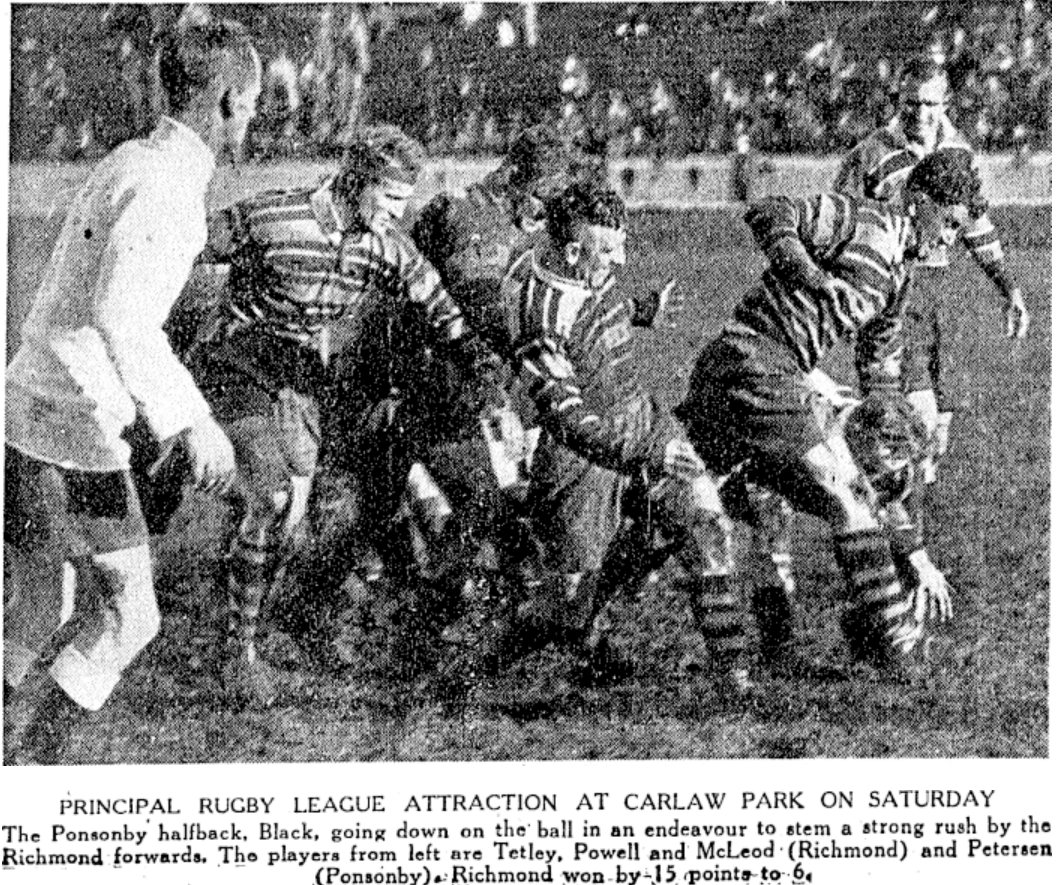
D.G. Black (Ponsonby halfback) going down on the ball with Richmond forwards Harold Tetley and Jack McLeod attacking with Roy Powell (halfback) between them. In the background is Clarrie Petersen (Ponsonby).

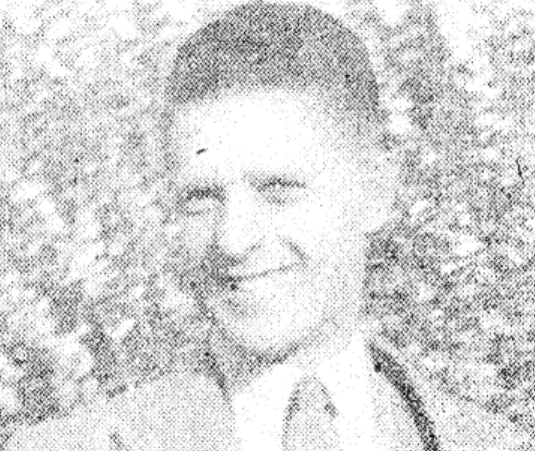
Bill Telford the Richmond forward who coached the New Zealand side in the 1950s.

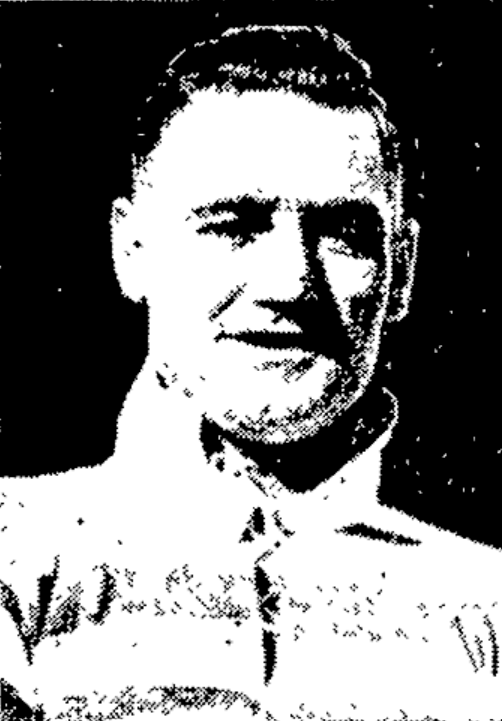
Claude Dempsey (Newton's outstanding fullback)

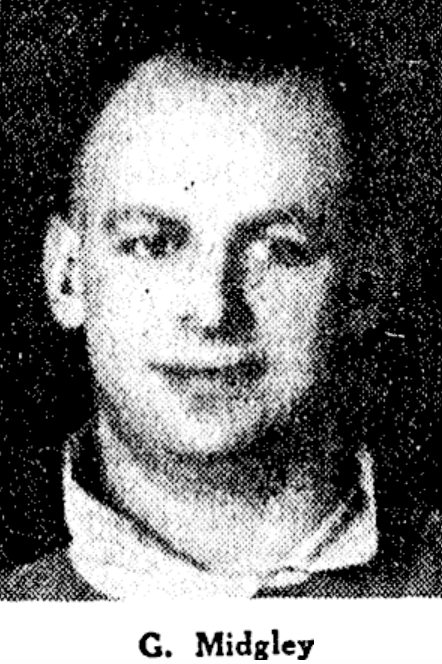
Gordon Midgley the Marist winger who score two outstanding tries.

All four games were played at Carlaw Park in "greasy" conditions. Richmond beat Ponsonby 15–6 with its New Zealand international stacked team attacked well in their forwards through George Mitchell and Harold Tetley with Mitchell "the outstanding forward on the ground". They were "well supported by Jack McLeod and Bill Telford. Of their backs Noel Bickerton and Wally Tittleton in the five eighths, and George Tittleton on the wing were the best. During the first half R.O. Jones was injured and was replaced by Roy Nurse. For Ponsonby their captain, Walter Stockley at Five eighths "teamed well with his supports". Richmond led 10-3 soon after halftime before Brian Riley in his first appearance for the season beat Owen Wilkie to score. However Frank Furnell kicked a second penalty for Richmond before George Tittleton scored a try from a scrum to seal the win. Arthur Kay at centre "was right on his game" and "kept a watchful eye" on his opposite, Ted Mincham. On Carlaw Park number 2 Manukau beat Newton on a "heavy ground amid occasional showers". Manukau led 12–0 at halftime with George Whye and Angus Gault "prominent". Peter Mahima as usual "opened up the play when speed" at halfback. Their centre, Joe Broughton "was mercurial at times" and Jack Brodrick "ran with fine determination, and Jack Hemi gave his best at fullback, occasionally running well to bring his backs into position". Though Brodrick was said to be "wasted as a back" as he was really a "champion forward". For Newton Claude Dempsey gave "a glorious illustration of positional play" while the Brimble brothers (Ted and Wilfred) "combined effectively near the scrum with great sharpness in attack". Frederick Hollis who returned after several weeks out injured "did some notable work" and Maurice Quirke, their hooker took the honours. Marist caused a big upset by beating Mt Albert 10–7. Jim O'Kane who had recently come back into the side "got a good share of the ball in the scrums". Their centre Reginald Haslam gave a "grand exhibition" creating "scoring opportunities for winger" Gordon Midgley who "played his best game to date". Ray Halsey had transferred to Marist from Mt Albert during the week "had an even duel" with his opposite William McCallum. City beat North Shore on Carlaw Park number 2 which "churned up badly". The game featured "driving rain" which led to the played being "covered in mud". North Shore were awarded a penalty late in the game which could have given them the win but a forward "elected to short punt" which failed. Cyril Wiberg played well at fullback for City, while Tai Raymond was good in their three quarter line at centre as he was usually a forward. Joseph Hapi "was strong on attack" and John Donald, Leslie Wehner and P. Minnix "were the best of an even attack. Jackie Rata's goal kicking won the game for City with both of his penalties coming from nearly 40 yards out on the sideline. For North Shore Hugh Simpson, Arthur Sowter, and Ted Scott were the best while Jack Smith "was the outstanding back".

5 June	Richmond	15-6	Ponsonby	Carlaw Park 1
3:00	Try: George Tittleton 2, Noel Bickerton; Con: Frank Furnell; Pen: Frank Furnell 2		Try: Edgar Morgan, Brian Riley	Referee: T McIntosh

5 June	Marist	10-7	Mount Albert	Carlaw Park 1
1:30	Try: Gordon Midgley 2 Pen: John Anderson 2		Try: Bert Leatherbarrow; Con: Cliff Satherley; Pen: Cliff Satherley	Referee: Percy Rogers

5 June	City	10-9	North Shore	Carlaw Park 2
3:00	Try: T McCarthy 2 Con: Jackie Rata; Pen: Jackie Rata		Try: Jack Smith; Con: Jack Smith; Pen: Jack Smith 2	Referee: M Renton

5 June	Manukau	18-11	Newton	Carlaw Park 2
1:30	Try: Joe Broughton 2, Peter Mahima, Thomas Rickett; Con: Steve Watene 2 Pen: Steve Watene		Try: Pat Young 2, Frederick Hollis; Con: Fredrick Sissons	Referee: D Taylor

==== Round 7 ====
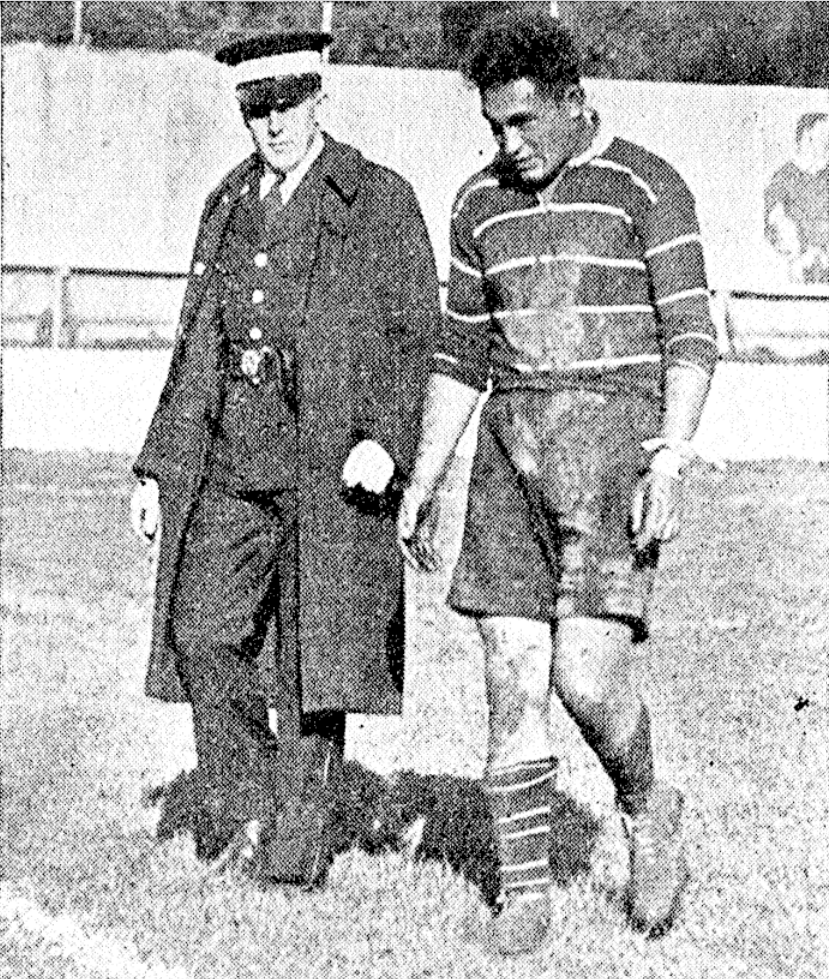
Hawea Mataira leaving the field in the first half after suffering a head injury for City on his debut.

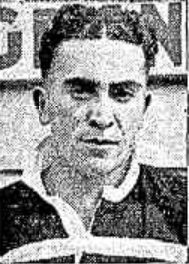
Rangi Chase debuted for Manukau at second five eighth.

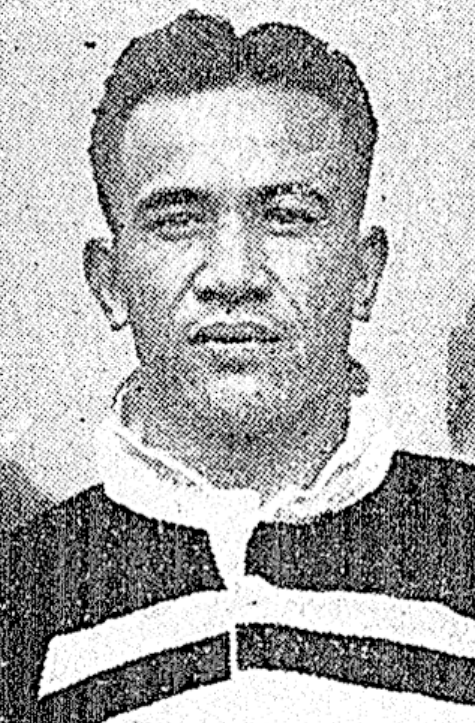
Tommy Chase debuted for Manukau.

A 1934 New Zealand rugby union player, Hawea Mataira switched codes and made his debut appearance for City in their match with Marist. He received a cut over his eye in the 35th minutes and came from the field in their 11–4 defeat to Marist. Marist back Reginald Haslam" was said to have been "here, there, and everywhere" for them. Tommy Chase and Rangi Chase both had also switched codes and debuted for Manukau also. Tom had been a representative player for Whanganui and a Māori All Black, while his younger brother Rangi had also played three matches for Whanganui in 1936. Tommy had played for Whanganui against Manawatu just three days earlier. All three would go on to represent New Zealand at rugby league. Rangi scored three tries and kicked a drop goal in his first appearance for Manukau and was said to be the "most scintillating star for Manukau". The match was described as the "most thrilling" of all the matches played on Carlaw Park to this point this season with "it crowded with incident". Richmond trailed 16-12 late in the game before the Richmond backs swept on to attack and five eighths Noel Bickerton who had handled twice already scored after "bewildering" Manukau. After this "fine straight running" by Wally Tittleton led to a try to clinch the game. Tittleton and Bickerton "combined well and five eighth. One of their chief advantages was in hooking the ball from the scrums with Jack Satherley in the key position. In the match between North Shore and Newton played at the Devonport Domain, Claude Dempsey played a brilliant game at fullback for Newton stopping a certain try and playing "faultlessly", though he was matched by his opposite, George Kerr. Len Scott was said to have "got a typical try in the last minute of the game" in reference to his remarkable ability to score a try in most games. Reg Hollows on the North Shore forwards scored two tries and was the "most prominent" of them. The game between Mt Albert and Ponsonby was played at Stafford Park in Northcote next to the present day Motorway shortly after it crosses the Waitematā Harbour. It was in aid of the King George V Memorial Fund and raised 6 pounds 5 shillings. Arthur Kay was outstanding for Ponsonby and should have gone alone more often as his passes after going clear "were missed".

12 June	Richmond	22-18	Manukau	Carlaw Park 1
3:00	Try: Leo Davis, George Tittleton 2, Noel Bickerton; Con: Frank Furnell 2, Ted Mincham 2 Pen: George Tittleton		Try: Rangi Chase 3, Thomas Curtis Allen; Pen: Jack Hemi 2 Drop: Rangi Chase	Referee: Maurice Wetherill

12 June	Marist	11-4	City	Carlaw Park 1
1:30	Try: Ray Halsey, Vincent Bakalich, John Anderson; Con: John Anderson		Pen: Cyril Wiberg 2	Referee: A Lennie

12 June	Mount Albert	8-3	Ponsonby	Stafford Park, Northcote
3:00	Try: William McCallum, Stewart; Pen: Cliff Satherley		Try: Walter Stockley	Referee: Percy Rogers

12 June	North Shore	13-0	Newton	Devonport Domain
3:00	Try: Reg Hollows 2, Len Scott; Con: Jack Smith; Pen: Jack Smith			Referee: Frank Thompson

==== Round 8 ====
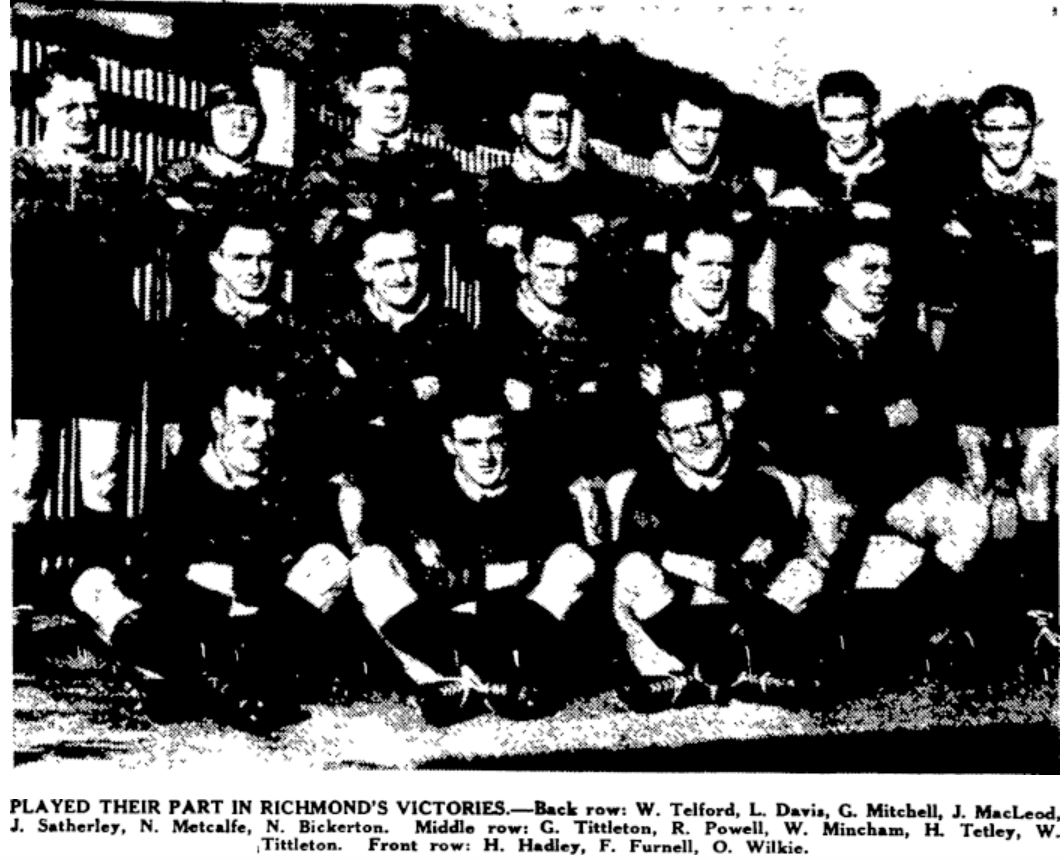
Richmond on July 3.

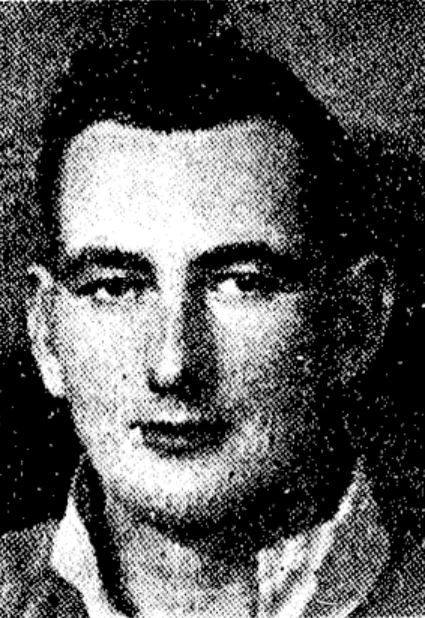
John Anderson (Marist's outstanding second rower)

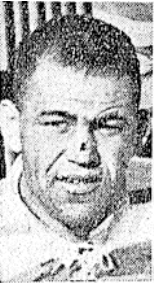
Frank Pickrang who debuted for Ponsonby after transferring from Manukau.

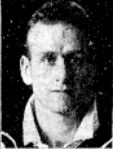
Harold Tetley the Richmond lock who played first five eighth and winger against Mount Albert due to injuries.

On June 19 the Auckland Rugby League granted use of Carlaw Park to New Zealand Football (soccer) for their test match against England. Most of the senior rugby league sides sent teams to various locations around the North Island to play friendly matches with local sides. The competition was scheduled to be resumed on June 26 but all rugby league in Auckland, along with several other outdoor sports was cancelled due to poor weather. Frank Pickrang transferred from Manukau to Ponsonby and made his debut for his new side "but was not at outstanding as expected". He had been trying to move for some time but chose to stand down due to transfer difficulties. Joining him at Ponsonby at the same time was fellow Kiwi, Joe Cootes who was transferring from Wellington. In Richmond's 15–2 win over Mount Albert their five eighth Noel Bickerton scored a try but was injured before halftime necessitating loose forward Harold Tetley having to move into his position and also spending time on the wing in the second half when fullback Frank Furnell came up to five eighth and winger George Tittleton dropped back to fullback. For Ponsonby in their comfortable 27–8 win over City on Carlaw Park 2 their first five eighth Frank Halloran played an outstanding game. The Auckland Star wrote "nothing better in inside back play has been seen in Auckland this season than the exhibition given by Halloran, whose thrust, judgment and well timed passing paved the way to tries which can be classed as polish in team work". On the wing Brian Riley outclassed his City opposite William McLaughlin while Roy Nurse was also "superior" to Bluett who had come to Auckland from Whakatane where he was a rugby player though he "nevertheless was a trier under new conditions". Lou Cootes, the brother of Joe Cootes debuted for Ponsonby. He had played against them a few weeks earlier for the St George club in Wellington when Ponsonby made a trip there. Lou was around 15 stone in weight and had represented the Horowhenua district at rugby union for four years before switching to rugby league this season in Wellington. The Auckland Star referring to the Manukau win over North Shore said "once more it was demonstrated just what an asset the Chase brothers... are to their side... they were continually in the picture ... quick to dart through the gap, they were a continual thorn in the side of Shore backs. Both were in fine form, but the beautifully built R. Chase was perhaps a trifle more polished than his more stocky brother. Their fine understanding of each others play was a feature, and they seemed equally at home at second five eights and centre when they elected frequently to exchange positions. Jack Rutherford hooked well for Manukau while Jack Hemi was the better of the two fullbacks which saw George Kerr their as usual for North Shore. For Marist in their 22-0 win over Newton, their fullback Bill Glover "gave a splendid exhibition of sure and accurate kicking, while Gordon Midgley displayed a fine turn of speed on the left flank" and John Anderson was their outstanding forward. For Newton their veteran fullback Claude Dempsey "saved his side on innumerable occasions, but did not receive much assistance". Pat Young made "several nice openings, but was inclined to hold on too long.

3 July	Richmond	15-2	Mount Albert	Carlaw Park 1
3:00	Try: Noel Bickerton, Bill Telford, Owen Wilkie; Con: Frank Furnell 2 Pen: Frank Furnell		Pen: Cliff Satherley	Referee: Maurice Wetherill

3 July	Manukau	31-11	North Shore	Carlaw Park 1
1:30	Try: Rangi Chase 2, Tommy Chase 2, Walter Brimble, Joe Broughton, Jack Hemi; Con: Jack Hemi 4 Pen: Jack Hemi		Try: Horace Hunt, Len Scott, Reg Hollows; Con: Jack Smith	Referee: Roy Otto

3 July	Ponsonby	27-8	City	Carlaw Park 2
3:00	Try: Arthur Kay 2, Brian Riley 2, Edgar Morgan, Walter Stockley, Roy Nurse; Con: R Jones, Dacre Black; Pen: R Jones		Pen: Jackie Rata 4	Referee: Percy Rogers

3 July	Marist	22-0	Newton	Carlaw Park 2
1:30	Try: Gordon Midgley 2, Clive Murdoch, Gordon Matson; Con: John Anderson 4 Pen: John Anderson			Referee: A Simpson

==== Round 9 ====
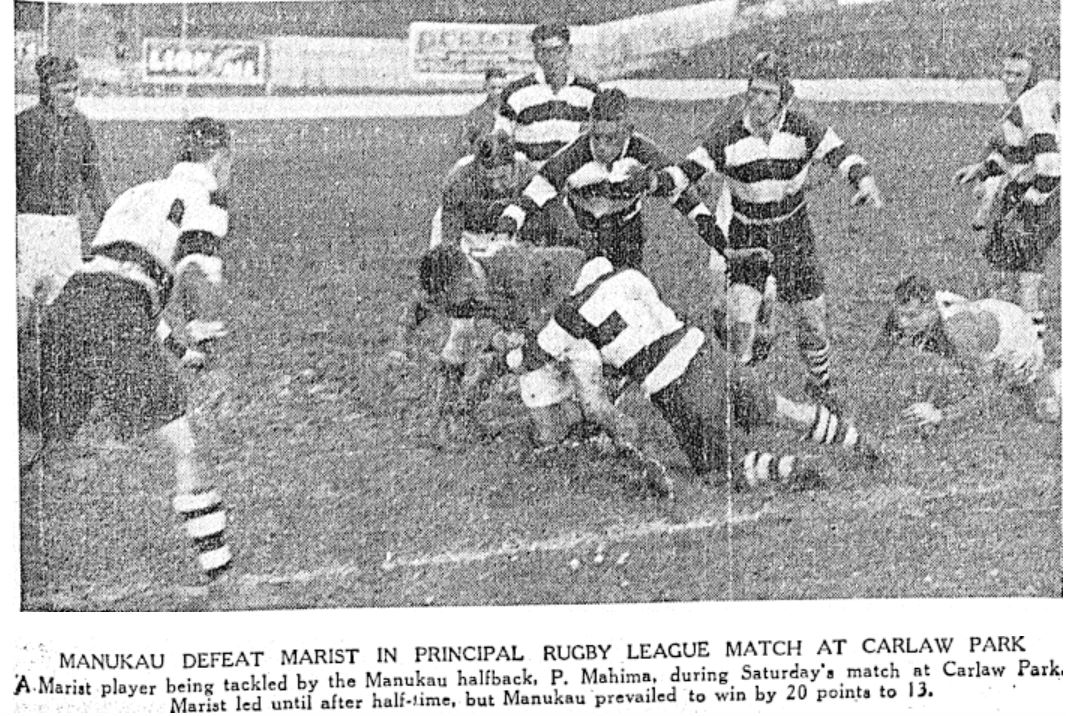
Angus Gault in the head gear close to teammate Peter Mahima's tackle.

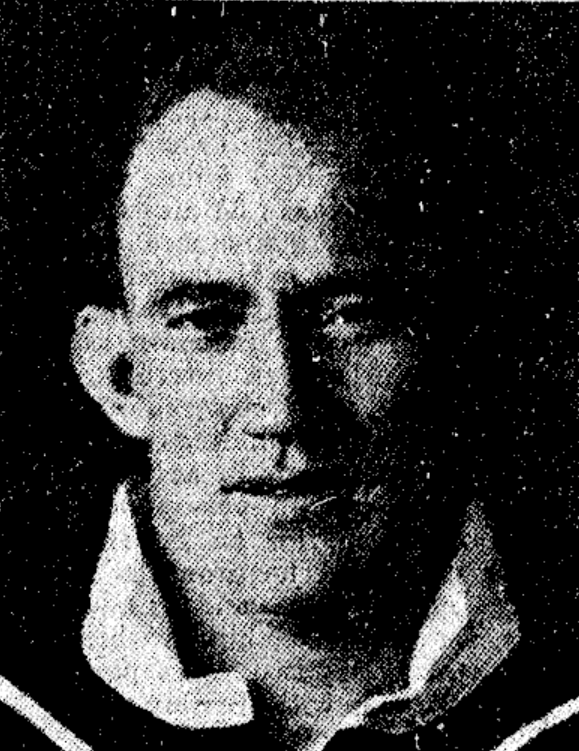
Des Herring, Mount Albert front rower.

Manukau were behind 10-9 to Marist and then 13-9 soon after the resumption before a great second half saw them win 20-13. For Marist, Reginald Haslam was "the scintillating star among the backs. Steve Watene reappeared for Manukau to captain the side after being injured in round 6. North Shore were unlucky to lose to Richmond with forward Arthur Sowter giving "a wonderful exhibition". Jack Smith, playing at five eighths "got the try of the match with a great run from half-way". For Richmond Jack McLeod and George Mitchell "showed up well in the Richmond forwards, and on form ... should win a place in the Auckland representative team". In their backs Ted Mincham "was in form", while their fullback, Frank Furnell "gave a flawless display". Mount Albert beat City with a last minute try. Basil Cranch, their fullback "compared more than favourably with [Cyril] Wiberg", while they fielded two promoted players in Patterson and H MacLachlan who played first and second five eighths respectively. In the City backline their Auckland Māori player first five eighth, Jackie Rata showed "flashes of brilliance". In the Mount Albert forwards Des Herring showed "his best form to date". In the curtain raiser on the No. 2 field the Ponsonby fullback, R.O. Jones "gave a first class display of safe handling and accurate line kicking...". For Newton Claude Dempsey and Henry Crook were their best backs with Dempsey starting at his usual position at full back but later moved into centre three quarter to contain the Ponsonby backs. Of the Ponsonby backs Brian Riley was their best. Frank Pickrang and Edgar Morgan were the best of a good Ponsonby forward pack.

10 July	Manukau	20-13	Marist	Carlaw Park 1
3:00	Try: Steve Watene, Painter, Rangi Chase, Thomas Allen; Con: Jack Hemi 2 Pen: Jack Hemi 2		Try: John Anderson 2, Ray Halsey; Pen: John Anderson 2	Referee: Frank Thompson

10 July	Mount Albert	6-3	City	Carlaw Park 1
1:30	Try: Des Herring, H MacLachlan		Try: Jack Tawhai	Referee: T Evans

10 July	Richmond	11-9	North Shore	Carlaw Park 2
3:00	Try: Bill Telford, Noel Bickerton, Roy Powell; Con: Frank Furnell		Try: Jack Smith; Con: George Kerr; Pen: Jack Smith 2	Referee: S Fisher

10 July	Ponsonby	26-7	Newton	Carlaw Park 2
1:30	Try: Brian Riley 3, Selwyn Davis, Arthur Kay, Walter Stockley; Con: R.O Jones 3 Pen: R.O. Jones		Try: Donald Fraser-Smith; Con: Hill; Pen: Fredrick Sissons	Referee: A Kinnaird

==== Round 10 ====
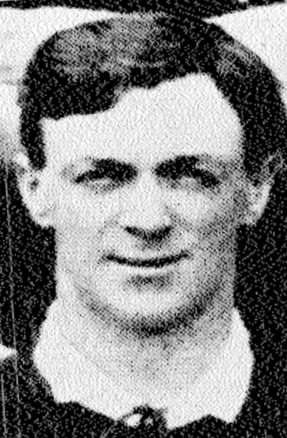
Maurice Wetherill, referee in the Ponsonby - Richmond match.

Ponsonby had their best performance of the season beating Richmond 10–9 in the feature match at Carlaw Park. The Ponsonby backs were excellent and only the defence of Richmond centres Wally Tittleton and Ted Mincham prevented more tries. The "Ponsonby pack was tenacious on defence and devastating in slashing dribbling rushes, some of which swept half the length of the field". Their best forward was L Cootes, who had transferred from Wellington, while Frank Pickrang and Clarrie Petersen "not far behind him". The Ponsonby standoff, Frank Halloran "was outstanding". The centres, Arthur Kay and Ted Mincham watched "each other cat and mouse fashion". There was an incident in the first half where several players began to play the man rather than the ball and two forwards "came to grips on the ground". Former New Zealand international Maurice Wetherill who was the referee had "some difficulty in restoring peace and it might have been better had he ordered off the two principal offenders", though after talking with the players there were no further issues. Marist beat Mount Albert 15–13 after John Anderson kicked a conversion and five penalties. Mount Albert were unlucky as they outscored their opponent by three tries to one. Marist were without Ray Halsey in the backs but Gordon Midgley played well on the wing as did H. McLaren at five eighth and Bill Glover at full back. For Mount Albert A. Hamilton on debut at halfback was playing well before having to go off injured and his replacement, Alan Watkins "lent thrust" after coming on. On the No. 2 field North Shore and City were involved in a "scrappy game". For North Shore who won 9–7 with full back George Kerr's "handling and kicking being right up to his usual good standard". Their other best backs were Jack Smith, and Verdun Scott while his cousin on the wing, Len Scott did not get many chances. On the wing for City, Samuel Hamiora Bluett scored a try. He had transferred from the Bay of Plenty where he had played rugby for Whakatane. At the outbreak of World War II he enlisted with his brother Charles and went overseas with the Māori battalion. He fought in the Grecian and Cretan campaigns but was killed in Egypt on December 11, 1941. In heavy conditions on the same No.2 field Manukau won 22–5 over Newton though the latter side played "with credit". The two halfbacks, Peter Mahima, and Wilfred Brimble gave "attractive exhibitions". The two hookers, Jack Rutherford (Manukau), and Maurice Quirke (Newton) "had an even duel". Manukau reshuffled their backline to make room for R. Wilson, a rugby recruit from the Bay of Plenty by moving Tommy Chase to second five eighth next to Walter Brimble, while Rangi Chase played at centre. It was said that "the transposition of the brothers hardly proved an advantage, but it is obvious that Manukau are now striking the form and combination that won them the championship last season".

17 July	Ponsonby	10-9	Richmond	Carlaw Park 1
3:00	Try: Frank Pickrang, Walter Stockley; Con: R.O. Jones; Pen: R.O. Jones		Try: Owen Wilkie, Wally Tittleton, Harold Tetley	Referee: Maurice Wetherill

17 July	Marist	15-13	Mount Albert	Carlaw Park 1
1:30	Try: Benny Crocker; Con: John Anderson; Pen: John Anderson 5		Try: Len Schultz 2, D Stewart; Con: Cliff Satherley 2	Referee: Stuart Billman

17 July	North Shore	9-7	City	Carlaw Park 2
3:00	Try: Verdun Scott 2, Reg Hollows		Try: Sam Bluett; Pen: Jackie Rata 2	Referee: T McIntosh

17 July	Manukau	22-5	Newton	Carlaw Park 2
1:30	Try: Rangi Chase, Steve Watene, Len Kawe, Peter Mahima; Con: Jack Hemi 4 Pen: Jack Hemi		Try: Hill; Pen: Fredrick Sissons	Referee: Owen Chalmers

==== Round 11 ====
24 July	Manukau	18-6	Ponsonby	Carlaw Park 1
3:00	Try: Steve Watene 2, R Wilson, Angus Gault; Con: Jack Hemi 2 Pen: Jack Hemi		Pen: R.O. Jones 3	Referee: Stuart Billman

24 July	Richmond	10-6	City	Carlaw Park 1
1:30	Try: Jack McLeod 2 Pen: Frank Furnell 2		Try: Jackie Rata, Hawea Mataira	Referee: Frank Thompson

24 July	Mount Albert	29-5	Newton	Carlaw Park 2
3:00	Try: William McCallum 3, Des Herring 2, Bert Leatherbarrow, D Stewart; Con: Bert Leatherbarrow, Cliff Satherley, Richard Shadbolt; Pen: Basil Cranch		Try: Donald Fraser; Con: Fredrick Sissons	Referee: A Farrell

24 July	Marist	18-10	North Shore	Carlaw Park 2
3:00	Try: Raymond McGreal 3, Gordon Midgley; Con: John Anderson 2 Pen: John Anderson		Try: Len Scott, J.C. Cowan; Con: Verdun Scott; Pen: Verdun Scott	Referee: A Kinnaird

==== Round 12 ====
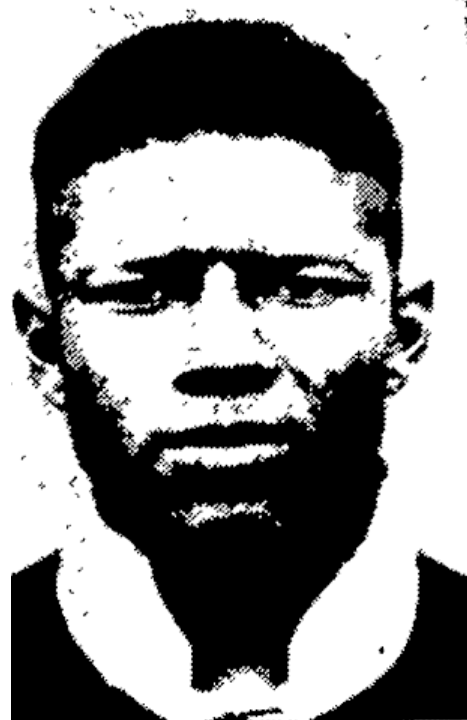
Ted Brimble played well in the Newton five eighths in their first win of the season.

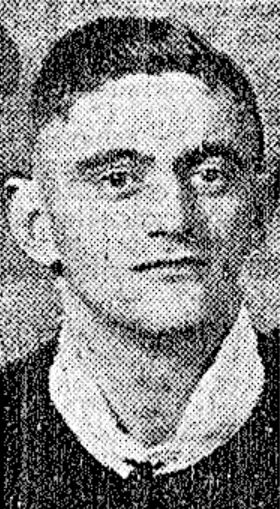
Noel Bickerton, Richmond first five eighth.

Richmond and Manukau fought out an 11–11 draw on a heavy ground in the main match on Carlaw Park. Jack Hemi, Manukau's great goal kicking fullback was missing from the side after suffering an injury in a midweek New Zealand trial match. The side missed his kicking which was done by Tommy Chase and Steve Watene who only managed one goal between them. Manukau missed six kicks and on full time scored a try but Watene's potential match winning conversion from close to the posts struck the cross bar and bounced back into the field of play. Richmond wore white armbands as a mark of respect to William John Holdsworth who had died two days earlier and had been patron of the club for many years. Richmond's lock, Harold Tetley "played a fine game" off the back of the scrum. Following the match when the New Zealand side was named to play Australia he was selected to play. Wally Tittleton had a strong game in the backs "showing fine appreciation of his supports" and defending wonderfully when his team was in dire straits". The outstanding forward for Manukau was Jack Brodrick who made a lot of ground with his "characteristic dashes" while Angus Gault scored a try after Rangi Chase "cut the defence to ribbons". Richmond then responded by intercepting a pass which Ted Mincham passed to Noel Bickerton with the ball then traveling the length of the field for Wally Tittleton to score which "delighted the crowd". Newton finally had their first win of the season when they beat North Shore 24 to 15. Their veteran 28 year old fullback Claude Dempsey "gave a fine display of handling and line kicking and was at his best. He was the incumbent New Zealand fullback though missed selection for the 1937 series against Australia. Bill McNeight debuted for Newton in the second row after transferring from the West Coast where he had been a representative player there and for New Zealand in 1936 and captaining New Zealand on their 1938 tour of Australia. They were also boosted by the reappearance of Alex Nathan who had been suspended for a year after an incident following a game in 1936. McNeight and Nathan had replaced Donald Fraser and S. Beattie who had to leave the field with first half injuries. Mount Albert had a surprising win over Ponsonby 20-0, after doubling their 10-0 halftime lead. John Schultz was outstanding at centre for the winners. Ponsonby was crucially missing their international centre Arthur Kay. Marist and City were level 5-5 at halftime before Marist dominated the second half. The try of the match came when H. McLaren in the five eighths grubber kicked through for John Anderson to retrieve before running straight for five yards and then sending a long pass to winger Gordon Midgley to score. Midgley used his pace throughout the game and set up another try through making a break through "sheer speed". Midgley had been a promising junior runner in 1934-35 and won the Auckland Amateur Junior 880 Yard race in February 1934 at the Auckland Domain. He ran in distances ranging from 100 yards to 880 yards and competed with many nationally recognised sprinters such as Allan Elliot and Alan Sayers.

31 July	Richmond	11-11	Manukau	Carlaw Park 1
3:00	Try: George Tittleton, Harold Tetley, Wally Tittleton; Con: Frank Furnell		Try: Angus Gault, Walter Brimble, Peter Mahima; Pen: Steve Watene	Referee: Maurice Wetherill

31 July	Newton	24-15	North Shore	Carlaw Park 2
1:30	Try: Henry Crook, Gibson, P Young, Fredrick Sissons, Ted Brimble 2 Con: Fredrick Sissons 3		Try: Ivor Stirling, Reg Hollows, Arthur Sowter; Con: George Kerr 3	Referee: Jack Hawkes

31 July	Marist	15-5	City	Carlaw Park 2
3:00	Try: Gordon Midgley, John Bakalich, Gordon Matson; Con: John Anderson 2 Pen: John Anderson		Try: Justin McCarthy; Con: J Hutchinson	Referee: A Simpson

31 July	Mount Albert	20-0	Ponsonby	Carlaw Park 1
1:30	Try: William McCallum 2, D Stewart, Jack Tristram; Con: Cliff Satherley 4			Referee: Owen Chalmers

==== Round 13 ====
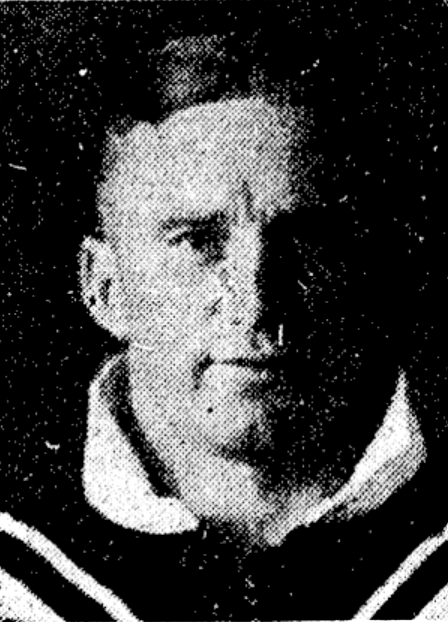
Bill McNeight, Newton's new forward from the West Coast Rugby League scored two tries in his second game for them. He was a current New Zealand international.

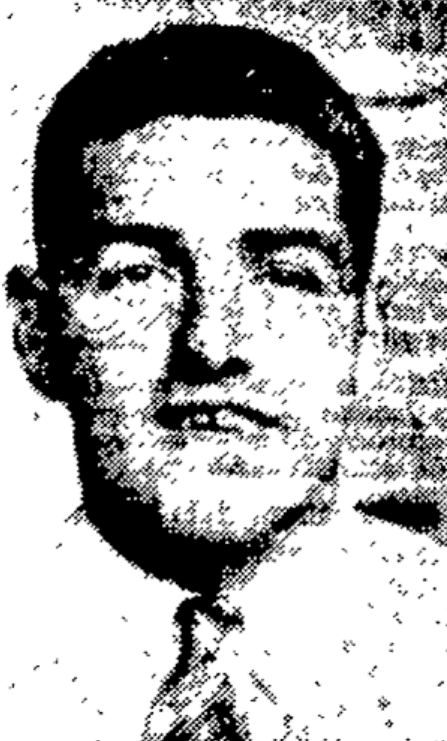
Len Schultz, the Mount Albert back who went off injured. He had played for York in England.

In their 20–19 loss to Mount Albert, Manukau were missing Jack Hemi, Steve Watene, and Rangi Chase with Tommy Chase moving into the vacant full back position and took the goal kicks. He kicked well, converting their three tries and two penalties but on full time he missed a penalty attempt from well out which would have given his side the win. Jack Brodrick, usually a loose forward, played at centre and did it "with credit". For Mount Albert their back, Len Schultz went off early with a leg injury and then in the second half they lost first five eighth J. Patterson to head injuries. He was replaced there by loose forward, Cliff Satherley who struggled in the position. Manukau five eighth, Walter Brimble was "the brightest back on the ground... [making] some really fine openings and dazzling runs. He took and gave his passes splendidly, and at all times drew his man before sending the ball along". Richmond trailed Marist 20–8 at halftime but rallied and threatened to win at one point before losing 30–24 in a match where tries were scored regularly, 12 in total. Ivor Uhlmann debuted at centre for Marist after moving to New Zealand from Brisbane and "showed promising form". John Anderson scored a try and converted all six of Marist's tries. Jack McLeod was the best forward for Richmond and scored a try where he ran 30 yards and "beat off all opposition". Ponsonby easily beat North Shore 23-9 who were missing their fullback, George Kerr. Verdun Scott substituted in the position and fielded "cleanly and kicked with judgement and good length". Their best back was Jack Smith. For Ponsonby Arthur Kay "stood out brilliantly in the centre", while Brian Riley and Roy Nurse "were a very speedy pair" of wingers. After winning their first game of the season in round 12, Newton won again against rivals City 34–19. Maurice Quirke hooked well for Newton. At halfback, Wilfred Brimble was "brilliant" while his brother Ted Brimble "frequently left the defence standing and teamed well with Hill in the five eighths. Centre three quarter Pat Young also played well scoring two tries. The team was also benefiting from the addition of Bill McNeight, the international forward who scored twice. The City backs struggled and Jack Tawhai did not play well in the unusual position of fullback, though Jackie Rata showed "occasional flashes" at centre. John Donald, Tai Raymond, and Hawea Mataira were their best forwards with the first two both scoring two tries.

21 August	Mount Albert	20-19 (12-9)	Manukau	Carlaw Park 1
1:30	Try: William McCallum 2, Des Herring, John Schultz; Con: Cliff Satherley 3 Pen: Cliff Satherley		Try: Peter Mahima, Walter Brimble, Angus Gault; Con: Tommy Chase 3 Pen: Tommy Chase 2	Referee: Roy Otto

21 August	Marist	30-24 (20-8)	Richmond	Carlaw Park 1
3:00	Try: Benny Crocker, John Anderson, Phil Donovan, H McLaren, Raymond McGreal, Gordon Midgley; Con: John Anderson 6		Try: George Tittleton 3, Jack Satherley, Roy Powell, Jack McLeod; Con: George Tittleton 2, Frank Furnell	Referee: Frank Thompson

21 August	Ponsonby	23-9	North Shore	Carlaw Park 2
1:30	Try: Daniel Keane, Edgar Morgan, D.G. Black, Frank Halloran, Brian Riley; Con: R.O. Jones 3 Pen: R.O. Jones		Try: Horace Hunt; Con: Jack Smith; Pen: Jack Smith 2	Referee: C Boneham

21 August	Newton	34-19	City	Carlaw Park 2
3:00	Try: Pat Young 2, Bill McNeight 2, Wilfred Brimble, Gibson, Cyril Clemm, Claude Dempsey; Con: Hill 4 Pen: Hill		Try: John Donald 2, Tai Raymond 2, J Hutchinson; Con: J Hutchinson, Jackie Rata	Referee: J Cottingham

==== Round 14 ====
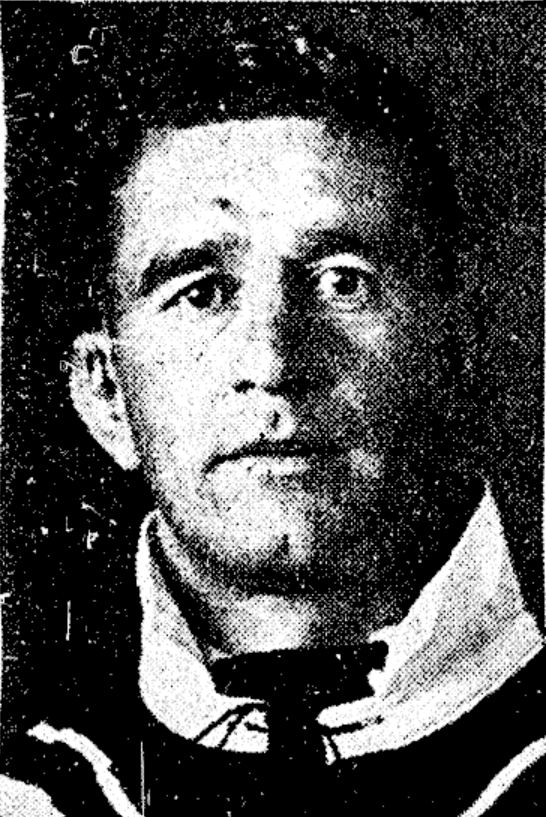
Jack McLeod the Richmond loose forward played an excellent game for the Fox Memorial winners. He had moved to Auckland from Taranaki at the start of the season.

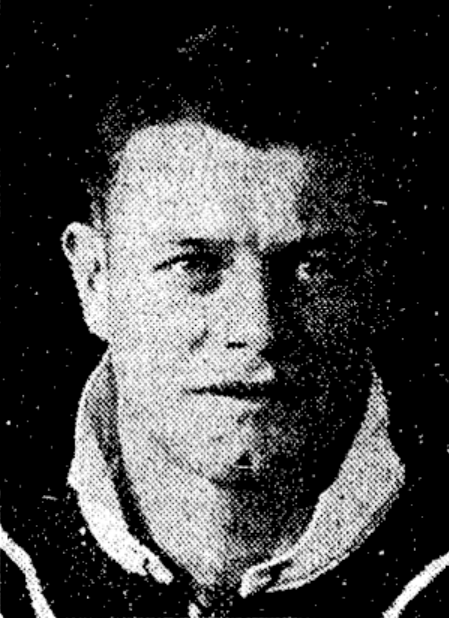
Jack Satherley the Richmond international fullback who scored two tries for the champions.

Newton's recent form and the fact that they were playing the competition leaders saw them playing in the main match at Carlaw Park. Whilst they played with great effort they were well outclassed and Richmond comfortably won 30–9 to secure their third Fox Memorial championship in four years. The score was only 12–5 at halftime but Richmond were in control for most of the match. In the second half, Jack McLeod and George Mitchell played very well in the loose for Richmond "chiming in to passing bouts" and sending out long passes. Jack Satherley played his best game of the season and scored two run away tries. They were boosted by their former forward, Alf Broadhead rejoining the side after transferring back from Wellington where he had moved for work reasons. Wally Tittleton, Jack Greenwood, and Noel Bickerton were the best Richmond backs with Bickerton being a "shining example" with his backing up. For Newton Bill McNeight was once again outstanding and made several breaks. Earlier in the same ground Marist kept their title hopes alive with a "lucky" 17–8 win over Ponsonby. It was reported that one of their tries appeared to be scored from a knock on while Ponsonby had a try disallowed in the second half. A section of the crowd was unhappy with the decisions. The Marist captain, John Anderson "was an inspiration to his pack". Reginald Haslam returned to the Marist backs in the centre position and his "ability to silence his vis-s-vis Arthur Kay was invaluable to his side". Bill Glover the Marist full back "gave splendid service and rarely did a thing wrong". Mount Albert won a high scoring game against North Shore by 38 points to 22. Neither team took defence very seriously. William McCallum played a brilliant game for the winners scoring three tries through his pace.In a 23–20 loss the Manukau backs struggled without Watene, Broughton, Hemi, and Rangi Chase though Angus Gault, and Jack Brodrick played well in the forwards. City's halfback J Hutchinson was their best back but it was their forwards who dominated with Tai Raymond "outstanding" and John Donald and Hawea Mataira also very good.

28 August	Richmond	30-9 (12-5)	Newton	Carlaw Park 1
3:00	Try: Jack Satherley 2, Alf Broadhead, Wally Tittleton, Jack McLeod, Harold Tetley; Con: Frank Furnell 4, George Tittleton; Pen: Frank Furnell		Try: Donald Fraser; Pen: Claude Dempsey 2, Hill	Referee: Maurice Wetherill

28 August	Marist	17-8 (10-8)	Ponsonby	Carlaw Park 1
1:30	Try: Gordon Midgley, F McLaren, Ray Haslam; Con: John Anderson 2 Pen: F McLaren; Drop: F McLaren		Try: Arthur Kay 2 Con: Ross Jones	Referee: T McIntosh

28 August	Mount Albert	38-22	North Shore	Carlaw Park 2
3:00	Try: William McCallum 3, Unknown x 7 Con: Unknown x 4		Try: Jack Smith, Unknown x 3 Con: Jack Smith 4 Pen: Jack Smith	Referee: A Lennie

28 August	City	23-20 (10-10)	Manukau	Carlaw Park 2
1:30	Try: Tai Raymond, Unknown x 4 Con: John Donald 3 Pen: John Donald		Try: Walter Brimble, Unknown x 3 Con: Tommy Chase 3 Pen: Tommy Chase	Referee: G Kelly

=== Roope Rooster (knockout competition) ===
==== Round 1 ====
4 September	City	21-13	Richmond	Carlaw Park 1
3:00	Try: Welch 2, Ryan, Arnold Porteous, William McLaughlin; Con: J Hutchinson 2 Drop: J Hutchinson		Try: George Tittleton, Wally Tittleton, Alf Broadhead; Con: Frank Furnell 2	Referee: Stuart Billman

4 September	Marist	15-6	Newton	Carlaw Park 1
1:30	Try: Reginald Haslam, H McLaren, John Anderson; Con: John Anderson 2 Pen: John Anderson		Try: Gibson, Joe Ginders	Referee: Roy Otto

4 September	Mount Albert	35-18	Manukau	Carlaw Park 2
3:00	Try: Bert Leatherbarrow 2, Basil Cranch, Bickerton, Des Herring, Leonard Verrall, William McCallum; Con: Cliff Satherley 6 Pen: Cliff Satherley		Try: Peter Mahima 2, Jack Brodrick, R Wilson; Con: Tommy Chase 3	Referee: Maurice Wetherill

4 September	Ponsonby	23-21	North Shore	Carlaw Park 2
1:30	Try: Brian Riley 2, Arthur Kay, Blackman, Roy Nurse; Con: R.O. Jones 4		Try: George Zane-Zaninovich, Horace Hunt, Arthur Sowter; Con: Jack Smith 3 Pen: Jack Smith 2 Drop: Verdun Scott	Referee: Frank Thompson

==== Semi finals ====
11 September	Marist	14-2	City	Carlaw Park 1
3:00	Try: John Bakalich, Gordon Midgley, Reginald Haslam, John Anderson; Con: John Anderson		Pen: J Hutchinson	Referee: Frank Thompson

11 September	Ponsonby	21-10	Mount Albert	Carlaw Park 1
1:30	Try: D.G. Black 2, Brian Riley 2, Frank Pickrang; Con: D.G. Black, Walter Stockley		Try: William McCallum, Joseph Gunning; Pen: Cliff Satherley 2	Referee: Ralph Otto

==== Final ====
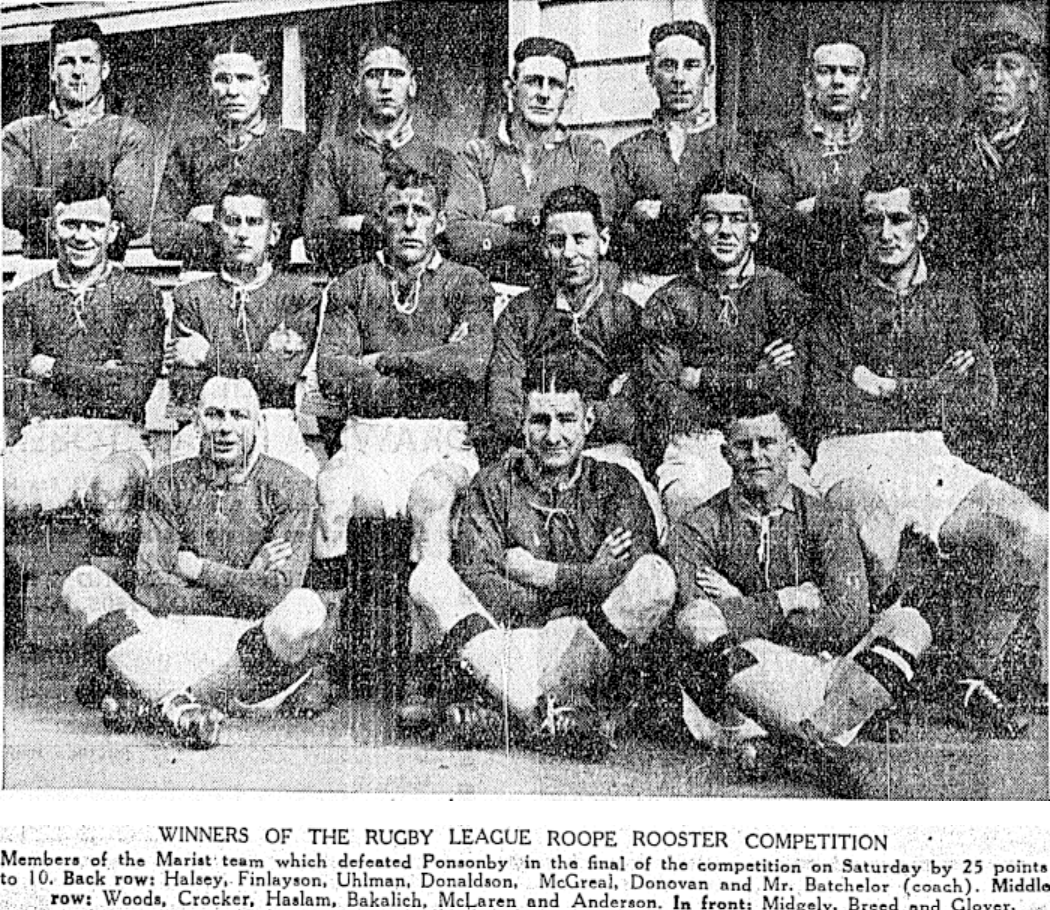

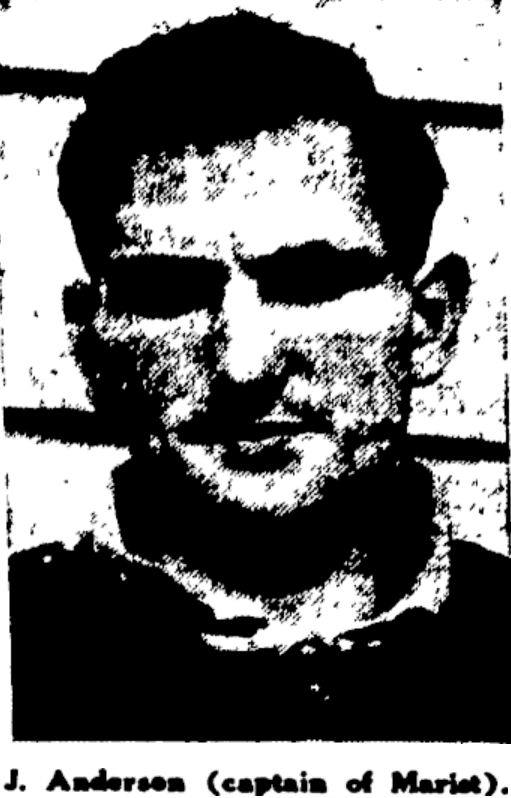
John Anderson who scored 13 of Marist's points.

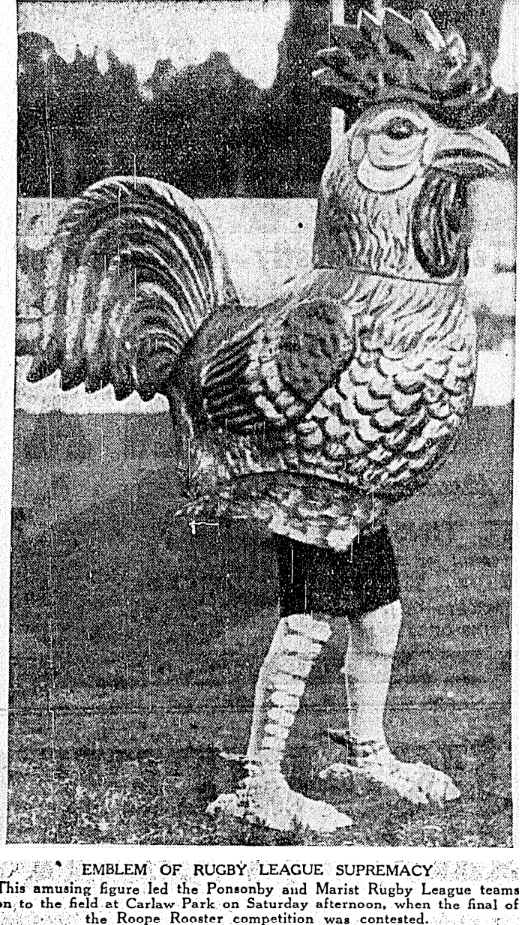
The Roope Rooster mascot at the final.

Marist won the Roope Rooster with a 25–10 win over Ponsonby. It was the fourth time in their history following previous wins in 1928, 1929, and 1932.Arthur Kay, the New Zealand back was absent from the Ponsonby side through injury but Brian Riley, their international winger took his place in the centre-three quarter position and "played brilliantly". Their inside backs however did not play very well with Frank Halloran not going well at first five eighth and he and Walter Stockley standing too flat footed. He was originally a halfback where he had represented New Zealand but had spent the majority of the season at five eighth after Dacre Black joined the side at halfback. Marist's best back was Reginald Haslam who was "outstanding" in the centre position giving "good service to his wingers". Ivor Uhlmann "gave his best display since coming over from Queensland" and Gordon Midgley joined him as a try scorer. Midgley was said to have "combined effectively with the inside backs, and further impressed his claims for consideration as a representative three quarter". Phil Donovan and H McLaren kicked too much in the five eighths while in their forwards John Anderson, Bill Breed, and Joe Woods "gave great service" and John Bakalich also played a good game in the loose forwards. Anderson had now scored 129 points during the season including the preliminary games which was a very rare feat for a forward.

18 September	Marist	25-10	Ponsonby	Carlaw Park 1
3:00	Try: Ivor Uhlmann, Bill Breed, John Anderson, Joe Woods, Gordon Midgley; Con: John Anderson 4 Pen: John Anderson		Try: Brian Riley, K Brown; Con: R.O. Jones; Pen: R.O. Jones	Referee: Maurice Wetherill

=== Phelan Shield ===
==== Round 1 ====
11 September	Manukau	17-15	Newton	Carlaw Park 2
1:30	Try: Harry Zane-Zaninovich 3, Peter Mahima, R Wilson; Con: Joe Broughton		Try: Maurice Quirke, Henry Crook, Claude Dempsey; Con: Beattie 3	Referee: Stuart Billman

11 September	North Shore	15-14	Richmond	Carlaw Park 2
3:00	Try: Jack Smith 2, George Zane-Zaninovich; Con: Jack Smith 2 Pen: Jack Smith		Try: Owen Wilkie 2, Ted Mincham 2 Con: Frank Furnell	Referee: Maurice Wetherill

==== Semi finals ====
In the semi-final between City and Mt Albert, Stuart Billman became the ninth referee to officiate in 50 matches between first grade sides in Auckland Rugby League history. Manukau were missing Steve Watene, Jack Hemi, Rangi Chase, and Walter Brimble but still put up a creditable showing. In the second half they were a chance of winning but a try to Jack Smith who played a "splendid" game at centre put the game beyond doubt. Verdun Scott played well for them at full back once more while in the forwards Barnett and Rogers were good as were veterans Horace Hunt and Ted Scott. For Manukau their best player was Jack Brodrick who seemingly played in the forwards and the backs throughout the game. In the other semi final Mount Albert won a high scoring game which was close until late before a flurry of points from Mount Albert saw them win by a wider margin. The winners were without several first grade players with reserve grade players taking their place. The Auckland Star wrote that the "reserve grade talent used suggests that the club has any amount of good players at its command". In particular Wilson at halfback was good while captain Richard Shadbolt was "too the fore" along with Bert Leatherbarrow and Joseph Gunning. Hawea Mataira left the field late in the game with a leg injury for City. For the winners who scored seven tries, their front rowers Bert Leatherbarrow and Richard Leatherbarrow accounted for four of them while Leonard Verrall kicked three goals and Basil Cranch and Leatherbarrow one each. City's four tries went to John Donald, Welch, Ryan, and Gibson while J Hutchinson converted three of them and Jackie Rata kicked a penalty before he too left the field injured.

18 September	Mount Albert	31-22	City	Carlaw Park 2
3:00	Try: Bert Leatherbarrow 2, Richard Shadbolt 2, Charlie Renton, Joseph Gunning, Jack Tristram; Con: Bert Leatherbarrow, Leonard Verrall 2, Basil Cranch; Pen: Leonard Verrall		Try: John Donald, Welch, Ryan, Gibson; Con: J Hutchinson 3 Pen: J Hutchinson, Jackie Rata	Referee: Stuart Billman

18 September	North Shore	16-10	Manukau	Carlaw Park 1
1:30	Try: G Brown, J.C. Cowan, George Zane-Zaninovich, Jack Smith; Con: Verdun Scott; Pen: Verdun Scott		Try: Jack Brodrick, George Whye; Con: Tommy Chase; Pen: Tommy Chase	Referee: Roy Otto

==== Final ====
North Shore was in its best form of the season with their 22–18 win. Jack Smith was "outstanding" at centre though he did not have a good day with his goal kicking. Their winger Bennetts ran strongly and scored two tries. For Mt Albert John Schultz and Charlie Renton in the five eighths played well along with Wilson at half back but their three quarters did not support them. I the forwards for Mt Albert Jack Tristram, Joseph Gunning and Bert Leatherbarrow were outstanding with the latter giving "valuable support".

2 October	North Shore	22-18	Mount Albert	Carlaw Park 1
1:30	Try: Hugh Simpson 2, Bennetts 2, Horace Hunt, Ted Scott; Con: Jack Smith; Pen: Jack Smith		Try: Drew 2, Bert Leatherbarrow, James Tristram; Con: Basil Cranch, Vernall 2	Referee: Stuart Billman

=== Stormont Shield ===
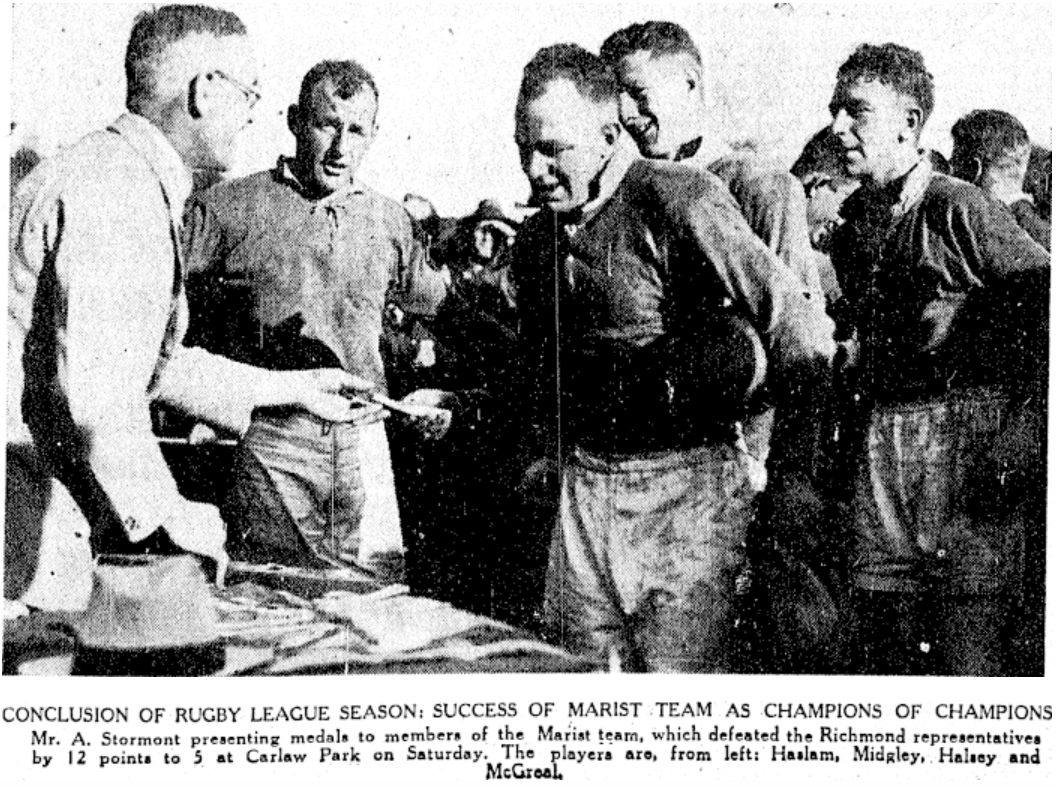
John Stormont presenting Reginald Haslam, Gordon Midgley, Ray Halsey, & Raymond McGreal with their medals

After the match John Stormont, the father of Bill Stormont whom the trophy was named after presented awards to various players. John Anderson capped a remarkable point scoring season by scoring all 12 of Marist's points, made up of 2 tries, a conversion, a penalty, and a drop goal. It was Marist's fourth Stormont Shield win with the previous being in 1928, 1929, and 1932. The win denied Richmond what would have been their fourth straight Stormont Shield victory. At the conclusion of the match John Stormont, the father of Bill Stormont who the trophy was named in honour of after his death mid season in 1925 presented the Marist players with medals. One of his tries came after running nearly half the length of the field and "his most spectacular effort was a field goal near the end. On actual achievement during the season there is not a better forward in Auckland, and his consistent omission when representative teams are chosen is something of a mystery". In the centres Reginald Haslam "gave a splendid exposition of centre play". For Richmond, Roy Powell played as well as usual at halfback as did Noel Bickerton. They were missing full back Frank Furnell, and brothers George Tittleton and Wally Tittleton, along with forward Jack McLeod. Wally Tittleton in particular being a serious loss to their back line. In the forwards George Mitchell was the "outstanding figure" while Jack Satherley consistently won the ball from the scrums.

2 October	Marist	12-5	Richmond	Carlaw Park 1
3:00	Try: John Anderson 2 Con: John Anderson; Pen: John Anderson; Drop: John Anderson		Try: Roy Powell; Pen: Ted Mincham	Referee: Maurice Wetherill

=== Top try scorers and point scorers ===
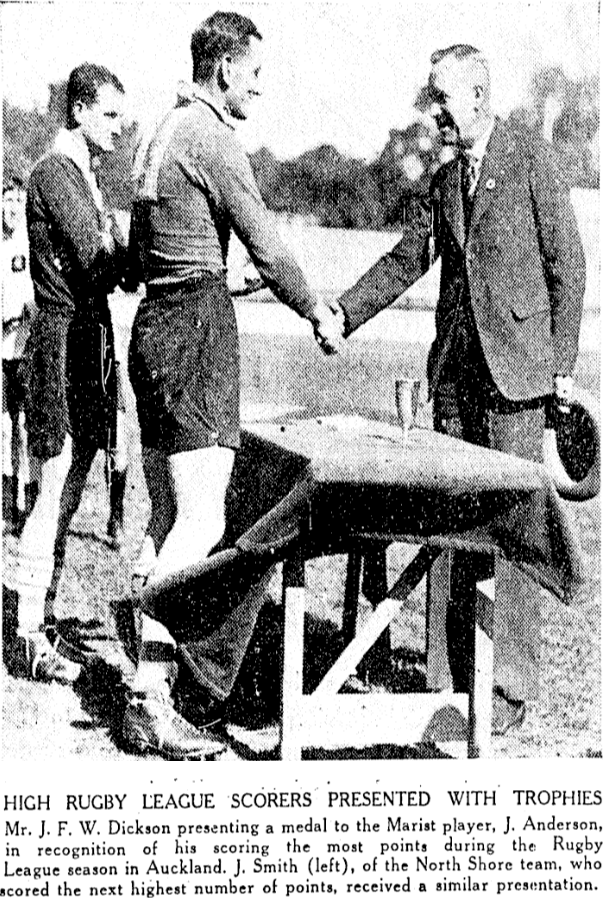
John Anderson and Jack Smith receiving trophies for their point scoring feats

The point scoring lists are compiled from matches played in the Fox Memorial, Roope Rooster, Phelan Shield and Stormont Shield matches which all first grade sides were eligible for competing in (provided they avoided elimination from the knock out competitions). The top point scorer was once again John Anderson. He scored 141 points in the aforementioned competitive matches and also scored in preliminary matches (although one of the two matches did not have scorers mentioned). He scored 8 points in a friendly match against Kamo. Jack Smith in his first season in first grade finished second with 109 points and was said to have scored 132 points in all club games which indicates he scored 23 points in the first preliminary game, the August 28 game with missing points, and the 19 June travel round game against Huntly. Both players would go on to represent New Zealand in 1938. The top try scorer was William McCallum for Mount Albert who was in his first season for them and scored 17 tries in just 16 games and scored another try in their friendly with Taranaki Combined. Gordon Midgley, an Auckland junior sprint champion was tied for second with 12 tries and he was also in his first season of first grade rugby league.

Top try scorers
Rk	Player	Team	Games	Tries
1	William McCallum	Mount Albert	16	17
2=	Arthur Kay	Ponsonby	16	12
2=	Gordon Midgley	Marist	18	12
2=	Brian Riley	Ponsonby	11	12
2=	George Tittleton	Richmond	17	12
6	John Anderson	Marist	20	11
7	Bert Leatherbarrow	Mount Albert	17	9
8=	Noel Bickerton	Richmond	19	8
8=	Owen Wilkie	Richmond	18	8
8=	Peter Mahima	Manukau	18	8
8=	Ted Mincham	Richmond	17	8

Top point scorers
Rk	Player	Team	G	T	C	P	DG	Pts
1	John Anderson	Marist	20	11	38	15	1	141
2	Jack Smith	North Shore	18	7	24	20	0	109
3	Jack Hemi	Manukau	13	4	19	12	3	80
4	Cliff Satherley	Mount Albert	16	1	25	10	0	73
5	George Tittleton	Richmond	17	12	14	2	0	68
6	R.O. Jones	Ponsonby	16	2	19	10	0	64
7	William McCallum	Mount Albert	16	15	0	0	0	45
8	Ted Mincham	Richmond	17	8	8	2	0	44
9	Frank Furnell	Richmond	12	1	14	6	0	43
10=	Arthur Kay	Ponsonby	16	12	0	0	0	36
10=	Gordon Midgley	Marist	18	12	0	0	0	36
10=	Brian Riley	Ponsonby	11	12	0	0	0	36

== Senior reserve competitions ==
There were several rounds of the senior reserve grade competition that had no results reported. These were rounds 7 where only 1 result was reported, and rounds 11, 13, and 14 where no results were reported at all. It is possible that Richmond Rovers had won the competition by the latter stages and so the fixtures became optional and possibly not played or of no championship significance and so therefore not reported by club officials. The Auckland Rugby League would often conclude competitions prematurely if a champion had already been found.

=== Norton Cup standings ===
Team	Pld	W	D	L	F	A	Pts
Richmond Rovers reserves	10	10	0	0	164	25	20
Marist Old Boys reserves	10	8	0	2	156	53	16
Mount Albert United reserves	10	7	0	3	166	73	14
North Shore Albions reserves	11	5	1	5	86	64	11
Ponsonby United reserves	10	4	1	5	65	73	9
City Rovers reserves	10	2	2	6	74	103	6
Newton Rangers reserves	11	2	0	9	66	186	4
Manukau reserves	10	1	0	9	25	224	2

=== Norton Cup fixtures ===
	Date		Score		Score	Referee	Venue
Round 1	1 May	North Shore	21	Manukau	0	Frank Thompson	Auckland Domain 1, 3:00
-	1 May	Richmond	16	Mount Albert	10	Stuart Billman	Auckland Domain 1, 1:30
-	1 May	Marist	37	Newton	0	Jack Hawkes	Auckland Domain 5, 3:00
-	1 May	Ponsonby	7	City	7	G Kelly	Auckland Domain 5, 1:30
Round 2	8 May	Marist	30	Manukau	0	T Taylor	Auckland Domain 2, 3:00
-	8 May	Richmond	12	North Shore	0	T Tracey	Auckland Domain 2, 1:30
-	8 May	Mount Albert	19	City	5	Roy Otto	Auckland Domain 6, 3:00
-	8 May	Newton	12	Ponsonby	6	D Taylor	Auckland Domain 6, 1:30
Round 3	15 May	Marist	5	North Shore	0	O Chalmers	Auckland Domain 2, 3:00
-	15 May	Ponsonby	11	Manukau	0	Frank Thompson	Auckland Domain 2, 1:30
-	15 May	Mount Albert	23	Newton	4	J Hammond	Auckland Domain 6, 3:00
-	15 May	Richmond	23	City	0	Roy Otto	Auckland Domain, 1:30
Round 4	22 May	Mount Albert	49	Manukau	0	Stuart Billman	Auckland Domain 1, 3pm
-	22 May	Ponsonby	14	North Shore	3	Frank Thompson	Auckland Domain 1, 1:30
-	22 May	City	25	Newton	5	Jack Hawkes	Auckland Domain 5, 3pm
-	22 May	Richmond	12	Marist	9	O Chalmers	Auckland Domain 5, 1:30
Round 5	29 May	City	16	Manukau	7	Stuart Billman	Auckland Domain 3, 3:00
-	29 May	Richmond	19	Newton	0	W Simpson	Auckland Domain 3, 1:30
-	29 May	Marist	3	Ponsonby	0	T Evans	Auckland Domain 5, 1:30
-	29 May	Mount Albert	11	North Shore	3	Roy Otto	Fowld's Park, Mount Albert, 1:30
Round 6	5 June	Marist	10	Mount Albert	8	A Farrell	Auckland Domain 2, 3:00
-	5 June	Richmond	10	Ponsonby	3	G Kelly	Auckland Domain 2, 1:30
-	5 June	Newton	19	Manukau	7	S Fisher	Auckland Domain 6, 3:00
-	5 June	City	2	North Shore	2	T Evans	Auckland Domain 6, 1:30
Round 7	12 June	City	?	Marist	?	A Farrell	Auckland Domain 1, 3pm
-	12 June	Richmond	?	Manukau	?	A Simpson	Auckland Domain 1, 1:30
-	12 June	Ponsonby	?	Mount Albert	?	J Gedye	Auckland Domain 5, 1:30
-	12 June	North Shore	10	Newton	5	A Kinnaird	Devonport Domain, Devonport, 1:30
Round 8	3 July	North Shore	31	Manukau	0	A Smith	Auckland Domain 2, 3:00
-	3 July	Richmond	25	Mount Albert	0	J Cottingham	Auckland Domain 2, 1:30
-	3 July	Marist	30	Newton	8	H Tate	Auckland Domain 6, 3:00
-	3 July	Ponsonby	6	City	2	J Ryan	Auckland Domain 6, 1:30
Round 9	10 July	Mount Albert	19	City	5	A Pearson	Auckland Domain 3, 3:00
-	10 July	Marist	20	Manukau	5	K McIver	Auckland Domain 3, 1:30
-	10 July	Ponsonby	12	Newton	8	A Farrell	Auckland Domain 5, 3:00
-	10 July	Richmond	8	North Shore	0	C Knott	Auckland Domain 5, 1:30
Round 10	17 July	Mount Albert	12	Marist	2	A Lennie	Auckland Domain 2, 3:00
-	17 July	Richmond	13	Ponsonby	3	Roy Otto	Auckland Domain 2, 1:30
-	17 July	Manukau	6	Newton	2	J Hammond	Auckland Domain 6, 3:00
-	17 July	North Shore	5	City	4	C Boneham	Auckland Domain 6, 1:30
Round 11	24 July	Richmond	?	City	?	Jack Hawkes	Auckland Domain, 3:00
-	24 July	Ponsonby	?	Manukau	?	A Simpson	Auckland Domain, 1:30
-	24 July	Newton	?	Mount Albert	?	T Evans	Auckland Domain, 3:00
-	24 July	North Shore	?	Marist	?	G Kelly	Auckland Domain, 1:30
Round 12	31 July	Mount Albert	15	Ponsonby	3	Roy Otto	Auckland Domain 2, 3:00
-	31 July	Richmond	26	Manukau	0	J Gedye	Auckland Domain 2, 1:30
-	31 July	North Shore	11	Newton	3	C Boneham	Auckland Domain 6, 3:00
-	31 July	Marist	10	City	8	W Simpson	Auckland Domain 6, 1:30
Round 13	21 August	Marist	?	Richmond	?	E Butt	Auckland Domain 3, 1:30
-	21 August	City	?	Newton	?	C Knott	Auckland Domain 5, 1:30
-	21 August	Mount Albert	?	Manukau	?	J McIntosh	Auckland Domain 3, 3:00
-	21 August	North Shore	?	Ponsonby	?	Stuart Billman	Auckland Domain 5, 3:00
Round 14	28 August	Ponsonby	?	Marist	?	Stuart Billman	Auckland Domain 6, 3:00
-	28 August	North Shore	?	Mount Albert	?	J Hammond	Auckland Domain, 1:30
-	28 August	City	?	Manukau	?	A Simpson	Auckland Domain, 3:00
-	28 August	Newton	?	Richmond	?	?	?

=== Stallard Cup knockout competition ===
Stallard Cup results
	Date		Score		Score	Referee	Venue
Round 1	4 September	Richmond	W	City	L	F Pearson	Auckland Domain, 1:30
-	4 September	Marist	W	Newton	L	A Lennie	Auckland Domain, 3:00
-	4 September	Ponsonby	W	North Shore	L	A Kinnaird	Auckland Domain, 3:00
-	4 September	Mount Albert	W	Manukau	L	G Kelly	Auckland Domain, 1:30
Semi finals	11 September	Marist	8	Mount Albert	5	A Simpson	Auckland Domain, 1:30
	11 September	Ponsonby	12	Richmond	9	D Gedye	Auckland Domain, 1:30
Final	18 September	Marist	22	Ponsonby	5	A Kinnaird	Carlaw Park 2, 3:00

== Senior B grade competitions ==
=== Sharman Cup standings ===
Team	Pld	W	D	L	F	A	Pts
Papakura	15	14	0	1	301	74	28
Point Chevalier	15	12	0	3	127	34	24
Green Lane	14	9	0	5	123	54	18
R.V. (Harvey & Sons)	12	8	0	4	113	50	16
Northcote and Birkenhead	13	6	0	7	35	72	12
Richmond Rovers	14	5	1	8	87	183	11
Mount Albert United	11	3	0	8	46	127	6
Newton Rangers	13	2	1	10	39	190	5
Manukau	12	0	0	12	27	114	0

=== Sharman Cup fixtures ===
The competition was won by Papakura who finished with a 14 win, 1 loss record. Fixtures were listed each week in The New Zealand Herald and Auckland Star however results were often not published. Following round 14 the Auckland Star published the points table to that point which indicated who the victors in several of the unreported matches were.

Following their round 2 match Manukau were advised that their team was out of order. They then defaulted their round 3 match after being given one more week to get their team in order before resuming in round 4. Glenora withdrew from the competition after defaulting in round 3. The round 6 loss by Papakura was their first loss for three seasons. In about round 15 both Manukau and Mount Albert withdrew from the competition as they were no longer listed in any fixtures form this point. At the September 7 meeting Papakura were congratulated on winning the Senior B competition. They had scored 304 points during the competition and only conceded 72.

	Date		Score		Score	Referee	Venue
Round 1	1 May	Point Chevalier	W	Manukau	L	W Simpson	Walker Park, Point Chevalier, 3:00
-	1 May	Green Lane	14	Newton	5	A Lennie	Green Lane, 3:00
-	1 May	Papakura	15	R.V.	11	T Tracy	Prince Edward, Papakura, 3:00
-	1 May	Mount Albert	NP	Glenora	NP	D Taylor	Morningside, Mount Albert, 3:00 *match not played
-	1 May	Northcote	5	Richmond	16	M Renton	Stafford Park, Northcote, 3:00
Round 2	8 May	Richmond	4	Point Chevalier	23	W Simpson	Grey Lynn Park, 3:00
-	8 May	Newton	19	Manukau	7	M Renton	Outer Domain, 3:00
-	8 May	Green Lane	12	R.V.	8	J Gedye	Green Lane, 3:00
-	8 May	Mount Albert	12	Papakura	15	Stuart Billman	Morningside, 3:00
-	8 May	Glenora	NP	Northcote	NP	A Lennie	Glen Eden, 3:00 * match not played
Round 3	15 May	Point Chevalier	W	Mount Albert	L	G Kelly	Walker Park, Point Chevalier, 3:00
-	15 May	Northcote	WBD	Manukau	LBD	Jack Hawkes	Stafford Park, Northcote, 3:00
-	15 May	Glenora	LBD	Green Lane	WBD	M Renton	Glen Eden, 3:00 *Glenora withdrew
-	15 May	Papakura	25	Richmond	0	J Gedye	Prince Edward Park, Papakura, 3:00
-	15 May	R.V.	20	Newton	0	D Taylor	Western Springs, 3:00
Round 4	22 May	Point Chevalier	L	Green Lane	W	J Hammond	?
-	22 May	Richmond	19	Manukau	8	J Cottingham	Grey Lynn, 3:00
-	22 May	Papakura	23	Newton	2	D Taylor	Outer Domain, 3:00
-	22 May	Mount Albert	?	Northcote	?	A Smith	Morningside, 3:00
Round 5	29 May	Point Chevalier	L	R.V.	W	Jack Hawkes	Walker Park, Point Chevalier, 3:00
-	29 May	Manukau	L	Mount Albert	W	J Gedye	Manukau, 3:00
-	29 May	Northcote	W	Green Lane	L	D Taylor	Stafford Park, Northcote, 3:00
-	29 May	Richmond	7	Newton	7	J Hammond	Grey Lynn Park, 3:00
Round 6	5 June	Papakura	3	Point Chevalier	8	Maurice Wetherill	Prince Edward Park, Papakura, 3:00
-	5 June	Green Lane	6	Manukau	0	C Boneham	Green Lane, 3:00
-	5 June	Northcote	L	R.V.	W	J Macown	Victoria Park 2, 3:15
-	5 June	Richmond	6	Mount Albert	2	Roy Otto	Grey Lynn Park, 3:15
Round 7	12 June	Manukau	2	Papakura	22	G Kelly	Otahuhu, 3:00
-	12 June	Richmond	7	Green Lane	18	S Fisher	Grey Lynn Park, 3:00
-	12 June	Northcote	W	Newton	L	J Ryan	Auckland Domain 5, 3:00
-	12 June	R.V.	29	Mount Albert	2	O Chalmers	Walker Park, Point Chevalier, 3:00
Round 8	19 June	Point Chevalier	29	Northcote	12	H Tate	Walker Park, Point Chevalier, 3:00
-	19 June	Green Lane	10	Papakura	12	G Kelly	Green Lane, 3:00
-	19 June	Mount Albert	17	Newton	0	A Farrell	Grey Lynn Park, 3:00
-	19 June	R.V.	43	Richmond	0	T Tracy	Victoria Park 5, 3:00
Round 9	3 July	Point Chevalier	43	Newton	0	M Renton	Outer Domain, 3:00
-	3 July	Manukau	L	R.V.	W	C Boneham	Victoria Park 1, 3:30
-	3 July	Green Lane	33	Mount Albert	5	A Kinnaird	Green Lane, 3:00
-	3 July	Papakura	21	Northcote	10	O Chalmers	Prince Edward Park, Papakura, 3:00
Round 10	10 July	Point Chevalier	7	Green Lane	3	J Hammond	Walker Park, Point Chevalier, 3:00
-	10 July	Richmond	11	Manukau	10	M Renton	Otahuhu, 3:00
-	10 July	Papakura	43	Newton	2	Roy Otto	Prince Edward Park, Papakura, 3:00
-	10 July	Northcote	?	Mount Albert	?	A Lennie	Stafford Park, Northcote, 3:00
Round 11	17 July	Point Chevalier	W	Manukau	L	A Kinnaird	Green Lane, 3:00
-	17 July	Green Lane	16	Newton	4	G Kelly	Outer Domain, 3:00
-	17 July	Papakura	6	R.V.	2	A Smith	Victoria Park 2, 3:00
-	17 July	Richmond	6	Northcote	8	T Evans	Grey Lynn, 3:00
Round 12	24 July	Point Chevalier	W	Richmond	L	H Tate	Walker Park, Point Chevalier, 3:00
-	24 July	Manukau	L	Newton	W	A Lennie	Ellerslie, 3:00
-	24 July	Green Lane	L	R.V.	W	W Simpson	Victoria Park, 3:00
-	24 July	Papakura	44	Mount Albert	8	J Cottingham	Prince Edward Park, Papakura, 3:15
Round 13	31 July	Papakura	37	Manukau	0	A Kinnaird	Prince Edward Park, Papakura, 3:00
-	31 July	Green Lane	11	Richmond	6	A Farrell	Green Lane, 3:00
-	31 July	Northcote	W	Newton	L	G Kelly	Victoria Park, 3:15
-	31 July	Mount Albert	L	R.V.	W	G Barnhill	Devonport Domain, 3:00
Round 14	14 August	Point Chevalier	15	R.V.	0	G Kelly	Victoria Park, 3:15
-	14 August	Green Lane	W	Northcote	L	A Pearson	Green Lane, 3:00
-	14 August	Newton	L	Richmond	W	A Smith	Auckland Domain 1, 3:00
-	14 August	Papakura	34	*Hikurangi	13	A Lennie	Prince Edward Park, Papakura, 3:00
Round 15	21 August	Point Chevalier	W	Northcote	L	G Bamhill	Stafford Park, Northcote, 3:00
-	21 August	Papakura	WBD	Green Lane	LBD	J Ryan	Prince Edward Park, Papakura, 3:300
-	21 August	Mount Albert	?	Newton	?	T Evans	Victoria Park, 3:30
-	21 August	R.V.	?	Richmond	?	A Lennie	Victoria Park 2, 3:30
Round 16	28 August	Papakura	23	Richmond	5	A Pearson	Western Springs, 3:15
-	28 August	R.V.	?	Newton	?	A Farrell	Victoria Park, 3:00
Round 17	4 September	Northcote	?	R.V.	?	W Skelton	Stafford Park, Northcote, 3:00
-	4 September	Point Chevalier	2	Papakura	12	Jack Hawkes	Walker Park, Point Chevalier, 3:00

=== Walmsley Shield knockout competition ===
Manukau and Mount Albert did not enter teams. Newton was initially drawn to play Papakura in round 1 but withdrew and instead Papakura travelled to Huntly to play the local side instead. Glenora entered a team but were knocked out in the first round by Point Chevalier. R.V. and Northcote & Birkenhead received bye's in round 1. Richmond drew with Green Lane in round 1 which forced the teams into a replay the following weekend which Green Lane won. Papakura had a bye in this round. Papakura defeated Point Chevalier in the third weekend of the competition and so joined Green Lane in the final with Papakura running out 19–7 winners.

	Date		Score		Score	Referee	Venue
Round 1	11 September	Point Chevalier	10	Glenora	0	J Cottingham	Victoria Park, 3:00
	11 September	Richmond	5	Green Lane	5	C Knott	Walker Park, Point Chevalier, 3:00
Minor semi-finals	18 September	Point Chevalier	42	R.V.	2	M Renton	Glen Eden, 3:00
	18 September	Green Lane	W	Richmond	L	J Cottingham	Ellerslie, 3:00
Major semi final	2 October	Papakura	12	Point Chevalier	2	A Lennie	Ellerslie, 3:00
Final	9 October	Papakura	19	Green Lane	7	G Kelly	Carlaw Park 2, 3:15

=== Senior club matches ===
==== Ponsonby XIII v Huntly ====
On Sunday, August 29 a Ponsonby XIII played Huntly at Swanson in West Auckland. A shield was presented to the winners (Ponsonby) after the match by Mr. L. Adams to the Ponsonby captain for the day, Stan Prentice, the former New Zealand international and Richmond club player. The shield had been donated by Mr. I. Culpan.

29 August	Ponsonby	13-2	Huntly	Swanson
3:00	Try: Pat Young, Selwyn Davis, Frank Pickrang; Con: Frank Pickrang, W. Gibbons		Pen: Davies	Referee: A. Harlock

==== Richmond reserves v Kamo ====
The Richmond reserve side travelled to Whangarei to play the Northland senior club champions on August 28. The Richmond side won by 27 points to 17. The Kamo team was unable to field a full strength side and included five players from the Hikurangi side, and also Reg Hollows who had been playing for the North Shore club for two seasons. Future senior players and New Zealand representatives, Abbie Graham and Laurie Mills both scored tries for the Richmond side.

28 August	Kamo	17-27	Richmond Reserves	Kamo, Whangarei
3:00	Try: L Hooper 2, Joab, Callaghan, Reg Hollows; Con: L Hooper		Try: Henry Sale 4, Abbie Graham, Laurie Mills, E Crookall; Con: Henry Sale 3	Referee: Scott

== Lower Grades ==
There were five lower grades in 1937 (Third Grade to Seventh Grade). This was a reduction of one on the previous season as the Second Grade was forced into the Senior B grade. There were an additional three schoolboy grades (Junior, Intermediate, and Senior).

Richmond Rovers once again won the Davis Points Shield for winning the most points through all club teams. City Rovers finished runners up. Papakura won the Tracy Inglis points trophy for junior clubs with Otahuhu runners up.

=== 3rd Grade ===
Otahuhu won section 1 while Richmond won section 2. The two teams met in the championship final on August 21 with Otahuhu winning 13 to 6. Richmond won the Walker Cup for finishing runner up. Ellerslie won the third grade knockout competition when they defeated Otahuhu 18 to 6 on September 11 after they had beaten Papakura 11–2 in one semi final and Otahuhu had beaten Marist 20–12 in the other. Otahuhu's record for the entire season was 14 wins, 1 loss, for 234 and against 59, gleaned from their team photo which hangs in their clubroom. Several sides played matches against teams from out of Auckland near the conclusion of the season including Papakura B against Hikurangi (12–8), RV against One Tree Hill Point, Otahuhu against Taneatua (28–8), Mount Albert against Portland (Whangarei) (8–5), and Glenora against Ngaruawahia (5-5).

==== Section 1 ====
Team	Pld	W	D	L	F	A	Pts
Otahuhu Rovers	12	12	0	0	208	29	24
Ellerslie United	11	9	0	2	93	24	18
Marist Old Boys	11	7	0	4	152	38	14
Papakura A	10	4	0	6	68	55	8
RV	11	3	0	8	34	108	6
Mount Albert United	10	2	0	8	43	107	4
North Shore Albions A	11	1	0	10	27	155	2

==== Section 2 ====
Newton withdrew after round 6 following three consecutive default losses while North Shore fielded a team for a match against Newton and then withdrew.

Team	Pld	W	D	L	F	A	Pts
Richmond Rovers	13	11	0	2	89	35	22
City Rovers	12	10	0	2	247	49	21
Manukau Rovers	9	3	0	7	10	138	6
Papakura B	10	2	1	6	37	104	5
Glenora	10	2	0	4	31	45	4
Point Chevalier	10	1	1	4	40	69	3
Newton Rangers	6	1	0	5	9	17	2
North Shore Albions B	1	0	0	1	0	6	0

=== 4th Grade (Hospital Cup) ===
Richmond won the championship when they defeated Ellerslie 10 to 5 in the final on July 24. Richmond also won the knockout competition with a 20–9 win over North Shore on September 4 after they beat Glenora 13–2 in one semi final with North Shore beating Ponsinby in the other. Point Chevalier defaulted their first match and then withdrew. Richmond played a friendly match with Huntly High School Old Boys on August 7, and Ellerslie played Ngaruawahia on September 11.

Team	Pld	W	D	L	F	A	Pts
Richmond Rovers	11	8	1	0	83	22	17
Ellerslie United	12	8	0	2	87	19	16
Northcote & Birkenhead Ramblers	11	3	0	3	43	36	6
Glenora	11	2	0	4	43	46	4
North Shore Albions	11	2	0	5	16	58	4
Ponsonby United	11	0	0	6	3	86	0
Point Chevalier	1	0	0	1	0	0	0

=== 5th Grade (Endean Shield) ===
Otahuhu beat Richmond 17–5 in the championship final on August 28, with City winning the knockout competition when they defeated Otahuhu 16–0 in the final on September 11. City had beaten Avondale in the semi final while Otahuhu's win in the championship final had doubled as their semi final knockout match. On September 11 the Richmond side played Kamo in a friendly match.

Team	Pld	W	D	L	F	A	Pts
Otahuhu Rovers	16	14	0	2	129	51	28
Richmond Rovers	16	13	0	2	235	36	26
City Rovers	15	9	1	3	181	30	19
Avondale	15	8	1	6	93	74	17
Papakura	13	3	2	7	110	62	8
Northcote & Birkenhead Ramblers	15	1	0	9	54	120	2
Ellerslie United	14	1	0	10	13	189	2
North Shore Albions	14	1	0	11	14	267	2

=== 6th Grade (Rhodes Shield) ===
City won the sixth grade championship ahead of Green Lane. City was declared the winner of the sixth grade knockout competition by the junior management committee at their October 5 meeting. It appears that they had played five extra full rounds following the championship but not in a knockout style and City had the best record over that time.

Team	Pld	W	D	L	F	A	Pts
City Rovers	15	9	0	1	139	32	18
Green Lane	15	7	0	2	84	29	14
Mount Albert United	15	4	1	3	74	53	9
Papakura	15	3	1	7	92	99	7
Point Chevalier	14	1	0	5	25	69	2
Richmond Rovers	14	0	0	6	8	118	0

=== 7th Grade (Myers Cup) ===
North Shore Albions won the championship with Richmond runner up. Very few of North Shore's results were reported though they had obviously won more than Richmond's ten wins. The for and against record of North Shore is made up of only four reported scores and is missing ten other scores. Richmond won the knockout competition on October 2 when they beat North Shore 12 to 2. Point Chevalier defaulted their first match of the season to Otahuhu and then withdrew from the competition.

Team	Pld	W	D	L	F	A	Pts
North Shore Albions	14	12	0	1	40	8	24
Richmond Rovers	13	10	0	1	180	47	20
Ponsonby United	14	1	1	7	17	44	3
Otahuhu Rovers	14	1	1	7	13	102	3
Glenora	14	0	2	7	21	70	2
Point Chevalier	1	0	0	1	0	0	0

=== Schoolboy competitions ===
The majority of teams were affiliated with a club side and were made up of schoolboys from that areas schools rather than one school in particular.

==== Senior (Rout Challenge) ====
Richmond won the senior schoolboys championship with Marist runner up. The Avondale Convent team was made up of players from the school on the site of the present day St Mary's school in Avondale. They withdrew after 8 rounds, while the Northcote side withdrew after 8 rounds also. The Auckland representative team made up of the competitions best players beat Northland 12–5 on August 28, and South Auckland (Waikato) 17–5 on September 18.

Team	Pld	W	D	L	F	A	Pts
Richmond Rovers	13	12	0	1	220	20	24
Marist Old Boys	13	11	1	1	134	40	22
Point Chevalier	11	7	0	4	34	44	14
Newton Rangers	11	5	0	5	75	92	10
Ellerslie United	10	4	1	5	97	66	9
Manukau	10	1	0	6	46	103	2
Mount Albert United	11	0	0	7	13	109	0
Avondale Convent	7	0	0	5	3	75	0
Northcote	7	0	0	5	0	58	0

==== Intermediate championship (Newport Shield) ====
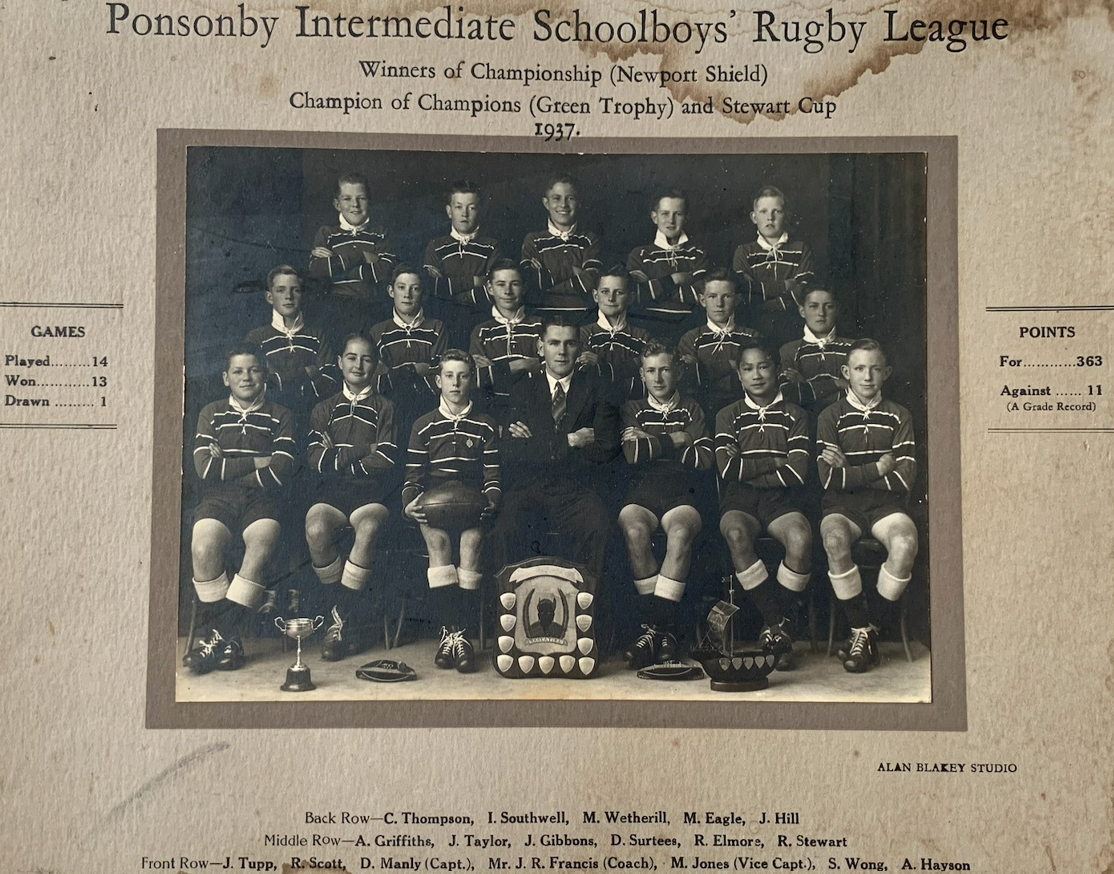
The Ponsonby intermediate team which won the competition.

Ponsonby won the championship when they beat Avondale in the final 3–0 on August 21. On September 11 Richmond defeated Newton 9–5 to win the knockout competition. Then a week later on September 18 a 'champion of champions' match was played between the championship winner (Ponsonby), and the knockout winner (Richmond), with Ponsonby winning by a single point, 9 to 8 to claim the Green Trophy.

Team	Pld	W	D	L	F	A	Pts
Ponsonby United	12	10	0	2	286	19	20
Avondale	12	10	0	2	118	20	20
Newton Rangers	10	7	1	2	119	36	15
Mount Albert United	9	5	1	2	37	63	11
Richmond Rovers	9	5	0	2	144	22	10
Otahuhu	9	3	1	3	52	50	7
Northcote	10	1	1	3	6	112	3
North Shore Albions	10	1	0	4	25	96	2
Marist Old Boys	10	1	0	5	16	63	2
Manukau	5	1	0	1	7	19	2
Balmoral	10	0	0	6	0	142	2
Point Chevalier	8	0	0	6	6	75	0
Ellerslie United	9	0	0	5	6	103	0

==== Junior championship ====
Newton A, who won section A, won the crossover final by 6 points to 3 over the winners of section B, Northcote, on August 28. The George Courts team won the knockout competition on October 2 against Newton A by 3 points to 0.

===== Section A =====
Team	Pld	W	D	L	F	A	Pts
Newton Rangers A	15	11	1	1	90	12	23
Ponsonby United	14	5	2	3	42	26	12
Mount Albert United	12	4	1	3	39	15	9
Green Lane	11	3	3	5	24	33	9
George Courts A	9	4	0	2	24	9	8
Manukau	15	2	4	5	26	39	8
North Shore Albions	13	2	1	4	6	18	5
Point Chevalier	12	0	1	9	3	105	1

===== Section B =====
Team	Pld	W	D	L	F	A	Pts
Northcote	13	9	0	1	72	6	18
Richmond Rovers	14	8	2	2	45	3	18
Ellerslie United	12	4	4	0	30	3	12
Balmoral	13	4	0	8	15	33	8
George Courts B	14	2	4	5	12	36	8
Marist Old Boys	13	2	3	5	9	33	7
Newton Rangers B	13	2	2	5	15	39	6
Avondale Convent	13	1	2	6	6	51	4

== Auckland representative team ==
Hec Brisbane was named the Auckland selector for the season.

=== Auckland (Auckland Pākehā) v Auckland Māori (Tamaki) ===
The opening representative match of the season was played on Coronation Day. For all intents and purposes the Auckland team was the Auckland Pākehā team. Although they were named "Auckland" they have been renamed Auckland Pākehā as that is what they came to be known as from 1938 onwards in matches against Auckland Māori.

12 May	Auckland (Auckland Pākehā)	24-14	Auckland Māori (Tamaki)	Carlaw Park 1
3:00	Try: Gordon Midgley, Arthur Kay 2, Wally Tittleton, Bill Breed 2 Con: George Tittleton 2, Walter Stockley		Try: Jack Tawhai, Jack Brodrick; Con: Steve Watene; Pen: Steve Watene 2 Drop: Jack Hemi

=== Auckland v South Auckland (Waikato) ===
Auckland played two matches on the same day against South Auckland (Waikato), and Taranaki. They won both matches. Neither was listed as an A or B team and both sides contained a large number of past, current, or future New Zealand international players. Former Ponsonby player, Kenneth Peckham who was now playing in the Waikato dislocated his right shoulder while playing for South Auckland and was taken to Auckland Hospital.

9 June	Auckland	26-12	South Auckland (Waikato)	Carlaw Park 1
1:30	Try: George Kerr, Gordon Midgley 3, Len Schultz, Bill Breed; Con: George Tittleton 4		Try: R Jackson, W Miki; Con: L Powell 2 Pen: L Powell	Referee: G Kelly

=== Auckland v Taranaki ===
9 June	Auckland	27-10	Taranaki	Carlaw Park 1
3:00	Try: William McCallum 3, Arthur Kay 2, Wally Tittleton, John Donald; Con: Walter Stockley, Steve Watene 2		Try: E Christensen, J Fraser; Con: J Fraser 2	Referee: Frank Thompson

=== Auckland v New Zealand Māori (Max Jaffe Cup) ===
The New Zealand Māori team was very similar to the one which had defeated Australia earlier in the season. The match was played as part of a Gala Day to raise money for injured players. George Nēpia traveled up from Gisborne to play in the match. Auckland was well below strength with several players out injured.

9 October	Auckland	21-43	New Zealand Māori	Carlaw Park 1
3:00	Try: Gordon Midgley, Dacre Black, Des Herring, John Anderson 2 Con: John Anderson, Frank Furnell 2		Try: Jack Tawhai, Joe Cootes, Jack McLeod, Jack Tristram 3, Jack Brodrick, George Mitchell 2 Con: George Nēpia 6 Pen: Tommy Chase	Referee: T Evans

=== Auckland representative matches played and scorers ===
No	Name	Club Team	Play	Tries	Con	Pen	Points
1	Gordon Midgley	Marist	3	5	0	0	15
2	Arthur Kay	Ponsonby	2	4	0	0	12
2	George Tittleton	Richmond	2	0	6	0	12
4	Bill Breed	Marist	3	3	0	0	9
4	William McCallum	Mount Albert	1	3	0	0	9
6	John Anderson	Marist	1	2	1	0	8
7	Wally Tittleton	Richmond	2	2	0	0	6
8	Walter Stockley	Ponsonby	3	0	2	0	4
8	Steve Watene	Manukau	1	0	2	0	4
8	Frank Furnell	Richmond	1	0	2	0	4
11	George Kerr	North Shore	1	1	0	0	3
11	Len Schultz	Mount Albert	1	1	0	0	3
11	Dacre Black	Ponsonby	1	1	0	0	3
11	Des Herring	Mount Albert	1	1	0	0	3
15	Angus Gault	Manukau	3	0	0	0	0
15	Claude Dempsey	Newton	2	0	0	0	0
15	Roy Powell	Richmond	2	0	0	0	0
15	Jack Satherley	Richmond	2	0	0	0	0
15	Joseph Gunning	Mount Albert	2	0	0	0	0
15	John Donald	City	2	0	0	0	0
15	Reg Hollows	Marist	1	0	0	0	0
15	Edgar Morgan	Ponsonby	1	0	0	0	0
15	Ted Mincham	Richmond	1	0	0	0	0
15	Walter Brimble	Manukau	1	0	0	0	0
15	Peter Mahima	Manukau	1	0	0	0	0
15	Bill Telford	Richmond	1	0	0	0	0
15	Frederick Hollis	Newton	1	0	0	0	0
15	Brian Riley	Ponsonby	1	0	0	0	0
15	K Brown	Ponsonby	1	0	0	0	0
15	George Mitchell	Richmond	1	0	0	0	0
15	Jack Brodrick	Manukau	1	0	0	0	0
15	Bill Glover	Marist	1	0	0	0	0
15	Jack Smith	North Shore	1	0	0	0	0
15	H McLaren	Marist	1	0	0	0	0
15	Bert Leatherbarrow	Mount Albert	1	0	0	0	0

== Auckland Māori (Tamaki) representative season ==
In addition to their loss to Auckland, the Auckland Māori side played in two other matches against Waikato Māori and North Auckland Māori.

=== Auckland Māori (Tamaki) v Waikato Māori (Waitangi Shield) ===
21 July	Auckland Māori (Tamaki)	28-6	Waikato Māori	Carlaw Park 1
3:00	Try: Jack Hemi 3, Joe Broughton 2, Jackie Rata; Con: Jack Hemi 5		Try: N Taoho, F Hilton	Referee: G Kelly

=== Auckland Māori (Tamaki) v North Auckland Māori (Waitangi Shield) ===
14 September	Auckland Māori (Tamaki)	37-3	North Auckland Māori	Carlaw Park 1
3:30	Try: Tommy Chase 2, Sam Bluett, Joe Broughton 2, Jackie Rata 2, Tai Raymond, Rogers; Con: Tommy Chase 5		Try: W Flesher

=== Tāmaki (Auckland Māori) representative matches played and scorers ===
No	Name	Club Team	Play	Tries	Con	Pen	DG	Points
1	Jack Hemi	Manukau	2	3	5	0	1	21
2	Tommy Chase	Manukau	1	2	5	0	0	16
3	Joe Broughton	Manukau	3	4	0	0	0	12
4	Jackie Rata	City	3	3	0	0	0	9
5	Steve Watene	Manukau	2	0	1	2	0	6
6	Jack Tawhai	City	3	1	0	0	0	3
6	Jack Brodrick	Manukau	3	1	0	0	0	3
6	Sam Bluett	City	1	0	0	0	0	3
6	Tai Raymond	City	1	1	0	0	0	3
6	Rogers	North Shore	1	1	0	0	0	3
11	Peter Mahima	Manukau	3	0	0	0	0	0
11	Jack McLeod	Richmond	3	0	0	0	0	0
11	Noel Bickerton	Richmond	2	0	0	0	0	0
11	Proctor	Newton	2	0	0	0	0	0
11	R Wilson	Manukau	2	0	0	0	0	0
11	Hawea Mataira	City	2	0	0	0	0	0
11	P Minnix	City	1	0	0	0	0	0
11	Len Kawe	Manukau	1	0	0	0	0	0
11	Tom Rickit	Manukau	1	0	0	0	0	0
11	Joe Cootes	Ponsonby	1	0	0	0	0	0
11	George Mitchell	Richmond	1	0	0	0	0	0
11	Jack Tristram	Mount Albert	1	0	0	0	0	0
11	Skelton	Ponsonby	1	0	0	0	0	0

== Annual General Meetings and Club News ==
- Auckland Rugby League Junior Management Committee They held their annual meeting on March 23 with Mr. D. Wilkie presiding. Their report noted that 60 teams took part in the junior grade competitions. A club ballot for members of the executive board resulted in the reappointment of Messrs. D. Wilkie, E. Chapman, A. Hopkinson, C. Howe, I. Stonex, R. Short, and F. Thompson, with Mr. E. McNamara as a new member. The ninth member saw a tie between R, Parr and T. Carey and a special vote was called for by April 6. When the vote was held Mr. Parr was elected. Mr. Wilkie was re-elected chairman, and Mr. W.F. Clarke honorary secretary of the board. It was noted that Mr. George Taylor, a member of the board had had to resign owing to ill-health, and to Mr. Chirmside. Two new members were later appointed in Mr. Skinner (Referees’ Association), and Mr. McNamara (ex-secretary of the Glenora Club). At their May 4 meeting twenty-two transfers were approved, and 108 new players were registered. At their May 18 meeting they were notified by the Glenora club that they had withdrawn their Senior B team (following the third round). It appears that they had not taken the field at all as no results were reported in any of the previous weekends. Manukau were given one more week to get their teams in order.
- Auckland Rugby League School Management Committee: Their 11th annual report stated that 30 teams had entered competition in 1936 which was an increase of eleven on the previous year. New teams were fielded by the Ponsonby, Newton, Manukau, and Mount Albert clubs. At their annual meeting on March 23 Mr. R. E. Newport presided. The following were elected as officers:- patron, Dr. M. G. Pezaro; president, Mr. Newport; secretary, Mr. Rout; executive committee, Messrs., A. Stanley (chairman), J. Armstrong, Foster, Jenkinson, Rowe, Rose Thompson, and H. Green. On 19 April at their management meeting they received a record number of nominations with 8 teams entering the senior grade, 15 in the intermediate grade, and 17 for the junior grade.
- Auckland Rugby League Referees Association Their annual meeting was held in the grandstand rooms at Carlaw Park in late March. Mr. L. S. Bull presided and he welcomed a number of prospective members. Their report stated that for the 1936 season there were 37 active referees and four official line umpires which constituted a record for the code in Auckland. There had been an improved standard of officiating and less criticism of them. Mr. G. Kelly was congratulated on winning the Carey Cup for the most improved referee. The following officers were elected:- president, Mr. L. S. Bull; vice president, Mr. J. G. McCowatt; appointment board delegate, Mr. A. Rae; control board, Mr. W. Mincham; junior management delegate, Mr. T. Skinner; official critic, Mr. A. Sanders; examination committee, Messrs. J. Hammond and A. Sanders; executive committee, Messrs, Maurice Wetherill, M. Renton, and G. Kelly; honorary secretary, Mr. Wilfred Simpson; honorary treasurer, Mr. A. Chapman; auditor, Mr. Percy Rogers; social committee, Messrs, R. Otto, Mincham, Wetherill, and Sanders. At the ARL Referees’ association meeting on April 27 the appointment of Mr. R. Benson as the elected representative of the control board was well received. On July 3 the Auckland Rugby League Referees Association held a reunion at the Tiffin dining rooms. Over 50 “50 pioneers, one of whom controlled matches 29 years ago”, were included in an attendance of over 100 with Mr. L. E. Bull presiding.
- City Rovers Held their annual meeting on March 18 with Ernie Asher acknowledged his re-election as hon. secretary for the 25th consecutive year. Mr. Ted Phelan was re-elected club auditor which was a position he had held for over 20 years. C. Raynes was also re-elected to office and had been involved with the club for 10 years but had been connected to rugby league in Auckland since 1907. He had been a player, coach, and trainer with the North Shore Albions, Athletics, Ponsonby, and Richmond before joining City. Mr. George Hunt was presiding at the annual meeting and was pleased with the large attendance. Lou Brown won Mr. Hunt's gold medal for the best back and he was also congratulated on his “display against the Englishmen”. Stan Clark won the award for best forward, and Cyril Wiberg received the A.A. Smith Cup and medal as the most improved player. I. Thompson and K. Belwood were recognised for practice attendances in the senior reserves. The fourth grade was acknowledged for being undefeated and scoring 438 points for and just 22 against. Mr. C. Olsen presented a framed photograph of the side for the teams club room at Carlaw Park. The following officers were elected:- patron, Mr. C. Raynes; president, Mr. George Hunt; vide-presidents, same as last year, with several additions; hon. secretary, Mr. Ernie Asher; assistant, Mr. J. Counihan; club captain, Mr. J. Ragg; auditor, Mr. Ted Phelan. The committee was composed of junior and senior grade nominated representatives, Messrs. J. L. O’Sullivan, R. Turner, S. Dickey, and T. Chernside and the executive officers. They held their annual picnic at Motuihi on October 17. Many events were held at it and S. Dickie came first in the club championship race with J. Ragg in second. D. Hutchinson came first in the senior grade handicap followed by L. Wehner. They held their prize giving on November 24 at the Masonic Hall on Eden Terrace with the presentation of trophies. President George Hunt congratulated the sixth grade team who won the championship and knockout honours. D Hutchinson won the miniature cup for the most consistent player. The following were other trophies presented: Reserve Grade – A. Potier, Third Grade – J. Ryan (most consistent 1936–37), R. Gibson, S. Trainer, and K. Speir (most improved), and I Hatton (exemplary conduct on the field). The third grade team was runner-up in the championship and winner of the knockout competition and received the Raynes Cup for the best average of points among the juniors. Sixth grade – R. price (most improved), B. Tracey (good conduct), A Mitchell (best back), H. Gordon (best forward), and C. Vasey (best all-round player). They held their annual meeting prior to the end of the year to elect officers for the 1938 season. It was stated that they had assets of over £50. They had finished runners up for the Davis Points Shield. Their members expressed their appreciation of Ernie Asher who was in his 28th year as secretary, and having been treasurer since the inception of the club. The following officers were elected: patron, Mr. C. Raynes; president, Mr. George Hunt; vice presidents, same as last year, with power to add; club captain, Mr. J. Ragg; committee, Messrs. J. O’Sullivan, T Chermside, S. Belsham, and W. Johnson, with the balance to be elected by grade teams; secretary and treasurer, Mr. Ernie Asher.
- Ellerslie United League Football Club On February 3 the Ellerslie Town Board met and discussed the improvements made to the recreation reserve and it was recommended that “two extra flood-lights be installed at a cost of £35 10/, and an ordinary light in the dressing shed. It also urged that the fence on the northern side be set back. Rugby league football was given use of the ground on alternate Saturdays from May 1 for £9. They held their annual meeting in the Parish Hall, Ellerslie with Mr. J. McInnarney presiding over the largest attendance “for some years”. They commented on the four teams which the club fielded in 1936 including the third grade team who had been coached by Charles Gregory and won the championship. The club hoped to enter teams in the senior B, third, fourth, and seventh grades, and also two schoolboy sides. The third grade side were presented caps and the R. Benson trophy. The following officers were elected: patron, Mr. A. G. Osborne, M.P.; president, Mr. J. McInnarney; vice-presidents, Messrs. R. H. McIsaac, A. Chapman, J. Court and H. McNaughton, with power to add; club captain, F. Chapman; committee, Messrs. G. Skeen (chairman), J. Pinches, A. Tobin, R. Hunter, T. Emery, J. Wilson, W. Miller, M. Campbell, H. Thomas, A. Strong; secretary and treasurer, Mr. G. Whaley; auditors, Messrs. J. Carr and O. D. Slye. The club held its annual schoolboy picnic on 16 October at Eastern beach. Taylor won the senior 100 yards. they held their annual full club picnic also on Eastern Beach at the end of November. F. Chapman won the club handicap race.
- Glenora Rugby League Football Club Glenora requested that a senior match be played at Glen Eden after one had been played there in 1936. Prior to the round 4 matches the Carlaw Park ground staff informed the league that the No.2 field was in a bad condition. As a result, the control board decided to just play one match on it and move the City v Newton senior match to Glen Eden. The Glenora club wrote to the Junior Board thanking them for playing the match there. On September 28 at the ARL junior management meeting Mr. N. Robertson was awarded a medal for the most sportsmanlike player in the third grade competition. The medal was donated by Mr. J. F. W. Dickson. Glenora's third grade team played a Ngaruawahia side at Carlaw Park as one of the curtain raiser matches to the Stormont Shield final.
- Green Lane Rugby League Club On April 20 the Junior management received with regret the resignation of the Green lane secretary, Mr. A. W. Wilson. The management committee decided to write a letter of thanks to the Auckland Racing Club for the use of its ground. Mr. F. Gadd was appointed the Green Lane delegate to succeed Mr. Kane who had resigned.
- Manukau Rugby League Club They held their annual meeting in late March with a large attendance estimated at 250. Mr. S. W. House made complimentary reference to the success of the senior team who had won the Fox Memorial the previous season. Steve Watene was congratulated on his selection as captain of New Zealand, as were Thomas Trevarthan, and Frank Pickrang for there selection. Watene was awarded the W. Cuthbert trophy as the best Auckland match player against England, and Pickrang was awarded the J. F. W. Dickson medal as the most improved Auckland player. The following officers were elected:-patron, Mr. A. G. Osborne, M.P.; vice patron, Mr. J. Park, Mayor of Onehunga; president, Mr. S. W. House; committee, Messrs. C. Randrup, A. Grant, E. Rewiti, H. Buckton, D. Williams, D. Sims and C. Pullen; club captain, Mr. A. G. Bates; secretary, Mr. Steve Watene; treasurer, Mr. A. Walton. It was said after their opening preliminary match that they turned out in a completely new uniform of blue and white instead of the black and white of the previous season. The club held its annual meeting on November 15 at the Returned Soldiers Hall in Onehunga. They had a credit balance of £51. Mr C. Randrup said the idea of holding the annual meeting at this time “was to enable early preparation for next season”. The following officers were elected: patron, Mr. A. G. Osborne, M.P.; president, Mr. S. W. House; committee, Messrs. C. Randrup, E. Reweti, J. W. Watson; secretary, Mr. Allen Porter; treasurer, Mr. A. Walton; auditor, Mr. N. A. Ching. The vice-presidents, with power to add, were also elected.
- Marist Old Boys League Football Club Held their annual meeting at King George's Hall in Mount Albert on March 10 at 7:30pm. Their annual report which was presented to the ARL on May 12. It was scathing of the performance and effort of many of its sides who were “hopelessly beaten last season, due to a lack of enthusiasm by the players and by those in charge of them. The senior team were the worst offenders, and their failure to show a proper example to the younger members in the matter of attendance at practice caused the executive much concern”. The outgoing committee recommended that players have to account for their absence at Tuesday and Thursday trainings. The following players were elected as follows: patron, His Lordship Bishop Liston; president, Mr. Joe Sayegh, committee (acting with coaches and ex-officio officers), Messrs. J. Ball, W. Maddigan, G. Copas, P. Hughes, and F Webberley; hon. secretary, Mr. Jack Kirwan; hon. treasurer, Mr. P Fletcher; club captain, Mr. Jim Laird vice Mr. Hec Brisbane; delegate to junior management, Mr. F. Thompson; to school management, Mr. G. Foster; auditors, Messrs. O. H. Johnson and J. F. Hollinrake; hon masseurs, Messrs. G. Duffy and D. Petty.
- Mount Albert Rugby League Football Club held their ninth annual meeting on March 10. The club report said that they had had over 140 players spread across several teams in 1936. The Mount Albert Borough Council had erected an up-to-date dressing shed at Fowlds Park training ground along with flood lighting for training. The annual cup given by vice patron, Mr. A. S. Richards, M.P. for the most conscientious player in any grade, went to L. Slattery, of the second grade team. Mr. H. Cottrell's medal for most improved senior was won by J Schultz, Mrs. Parvin's medal for most consistent reserve player went to E. Dunne, and Mrs Hanlon's medal for the best all-rounder in the seconds to J. Patterson. A Sumich won the cup give for the best schoolboy. The club reported a credit balance of £102 5/. Over 200 players and supporters attended their annual meeting with Mr. A. C. Gallagher presiding. They decided to hold a “district queen carnival in conjunction with the bowling club and local branch of the R.S.A.”. The following officers were elected as follows:- patron, the Mayor (Mr. Henry Albert Anderson); vice-patron, Mr. Arthur Shapton Richards, M.P., president Mr. A. C. Gallagher; vice presidents, same as last year with power to add; secretary, Mr. H. G. Shaw; assistant, Mr. R. Larson; treasurer, Mr. W. Schultz; club captain, Mr. F. Martin; auditor, Mr. S. C. Johnston. On April 24 Mount Albert held a gala day sports meeting in aid of the Queen Carnival which was being run for the benefit of the Mount Albert RL club, the Ex-Servicemen's Club, and the Mount Albert Bowling Club. A seven-a-side football competition for schoolboys, wrestling displays, fancy dress and other novelty events would be held along with a match between Mount Albert seniors against Richmond. In mid May Mount Albert signed J. Tristram who was an All Black trialist in 1936. He weighed 13.5st and had previously played for the Frankton club and Waikato. Mount Albert held a dance organised by their committee in aid of the carnival funds on June 14. It was held at the Peter Pan Cabaret.
- Newton Rangers Football Club held their annual meeting at the Y.M.C.A. Patron Mr. M. Hooper congratulated the club on its sound progress and referred to the loss to Te Awamutu of the chairman Mr. Roy C. Baddeley. After 26 years of service Mr. G. Steven was made a life member. The chairman on behalf of the donor, Mr. Cloke, presented a blazer to Athol Massey for “his fine leadership and example as captain of the third grade A team”. The following officers were elected: patron, Mr. M. Hooper; vice-patron, Mr. W. Monteith; president, the hon. W. E. Parry; vice presidents, same as last year, with power to add; secretary and assistant, Messrs. E. W. Cloke and G Matthews; treasurer, Mr. P. Henry; committee, Messrs. G Steven, J. F. Dyer, N. Reston, K. Grantley, and C. Moyle. On June 30 at the board of control meeting the suspension of A. Nathan for an off field incident during the previous season was uplifted after “strong representations from Newton Rangers”. The incident the previous season had dragged on as several efforts were made to appeal the decision for weeks and months after the incident.
- North Shore Albions On January 9 ‘Devonport’ held a dance at the Masonic Hall in Devonport organised by the Junior Rugby League. The venue was decorated in the club colours of green and white. They held another similar event in early February. At their annual club meeting on March 17 Mr. Archie Ferguson presided. There was discussion of the name of the club. “Owing to the district restriction implied by the name “Devonport”, and the fact that the team was always called “Shore”, Mr. H. Mann was supported in a proposal for a reversion to the club's old name, North Shore Albion Rugby League Club”. The name of Devonport United had been adopted when North Shore Albions merged with the Sunnyside club many years earlier and the Sunnyside members refused to accept the name of North Shore. The motion to change the name back to North Shore Albions was adopted. Club trophies were presented to the following players: W. Thompson (reserves), J. Smith and L. Brown (third grade), P. McCavery and F Hines (fourths), G. Gilbert and F. Calderbank (fifths), and G. Drough (schoolboys). Len Scott was congratulated on his New Zealand selection. The following officers were elected:- patron, Captain Meiklejohn; vice patrons, Messrs. Mr. J. Donald and E. Kelly; president, Mr. Archie Ferguson; vice presidents, same as last year, with several new nominations; club captain, Mr. F. Bolger; schoolboy delegate, Mr. V. Rose; hon secretary and treasurer, Mr. M. Coghlan; hon auditor, Mr. E. Ford; committee, Messrs. Mann, Foster, Langton, Williams, Seagar, and Johnson.
- Northcote and Birkenhead Ramblers Football Club Northcote sent a request to the Junior Management Committee on May 4 asking that a senior match be played in the suburb in aid of the King George V. Memorial Fund on the municipal ground which would be free of charge for the occasion. The application was referred to the control board. On September 21 the Northcote Borough Council received a letter from the Northcote club expressing “appreciation of the facilities provided for practice and matches at the Municipal ground in Stafford Road where the conditions were far superior to the grounds played on in and about Auckland City.
- Otahuhu Rovers Rugby League Football Club At the Otahuhu Borough Council meeting on March 8 the use of Sturges Park in Otahuhu was discussed. The ARL asked for all football codes to be considered (after the Otahuhu RL club was denied use of the ground controversially in 1936). The ARL suggested that the “opportunity be given to all codes to tender for the ground for the whole season, or that the Otahuhu Council should follow the lead of other local bodies and make a flat charge for the ground and allot it on a pro rata basis. The council decided to invite representatives of the rugby league to attend a special meeting on March 10 to state their proposals. At the twenty sixth annual meeting of the Otahuhu Rugby League Football Club Mr. J. Clark presided. The seventh grade players were presented with caps in honour of winning their championship. The club had also won the points shield for junior clubs. The following officers were elected:- patron, Mr. Charles Robert Petrie, M.P.; president Mr. J. Nicholson; vice presidents, same as last year, with several additions, chairman, Mr. J. Clark; hon secretary, Mr. W. Hart; hon treasurer, Mr. Ivan Kelly; committee, Messrs. Docherty, C. Clarke, O. McManus, M. Harris, T. Auckram, W. Gordon, J. Porteous, T. Mann, and W. G. Bright. The club nominated seven teams for the 1937 season. In mid October the Otahuhu Rovers held a social evening organised largely by the ladies’ committee to celebrate the third and fifth grade teams who won their championships. There were approximately 300 people in attendance at the Otahuhu Public Hall. Mr. H. T. Clements presented the teams with caps for their success. A trophy for the most conscientious seventh grade player was won by M. Miles, and E. McManus won the Porteous Medal for the best schoolboy player. In September the Otahuhu third grade team travelled to Taneatua and played the Bay of Plenty juniors, winning 28–6.
- Papakura Rugby League Football Club Papakura held a dance on January 26 at the Regent Theatre with a large attendance present estimated at 450. The Senior B team which won the Sharman Cup and Walmsley Shield in 1936 was presented with their caps by manager Les McVeagh. Captain Gordon Wilson paid tribute to vice-captain Mr. E. Pope who “had not missed a match for five seasons, and during that time he had played in 95 games”. They held their sixth annual meeting on March 4 with Mr. Gordon Wilson presiding before around 70. The annual report showed expenditure of £136 and a credit balance of £80 17s 5d. The amount spent on transport was £55. The following officers were elected: patron, Mr. Hugh A. Pollock; president Mr Les McVeagh; vice presidents, Messrs S. H. Godden, Allan McGregor, A Richardson, F. J. Verner, V Hardwick, and C Chamberlain; executive committee Messrs G. Wilson, V and E Ashby, W.K. Francis jun., W. Elliot, N. Widdowson and R. S. Williams; grounds Messrs F. Wells, A Schwartsfeger, A Hill and R Bates; social Messrs E Searle, M Wright, R Hammond and A McGuiness; treasurer Mr R Walsh; club captain, Mr Frank Osborne; physicians, Dr. G. W. Lock and Dr. Warren Young; auditor Mr J Beams. They held a dance at the Regent Theatre on March 2. In April the club held two practice matches at Prince Edward Park with J. Fogarty, an ex-South Auckland and Manukau Rugby Union representative appearing. Papakura intended on fielding five teams in various grades. The club saw an increase of their ground rental at Prince Edward Park of £5 to £10 at the Papakura Town Board meeting in mid April. Mr. H. D. Spinley said “he was aware that ground rents in Auckland had increased, but to raise the charge” by that amount was “not playing the game” with the League club when compared with the board's proposal to charge the Rugby union club £1 1s for the railway reserve. Mr. D. Weir replied “if the railway reserve was in the same condition as prince Edward Park it, too would be worth £10, but the reserve is rough and has not the same facilities as the park. A deputation was sent to a Papakura Town Board's meeting 2 weeks later however the board stood by their decision after stating that they were spending more on the ground than they were receiving from the club including grass cutting, fence constructions, goal posts, flood lighting and installing a cold shower. The Manurewa Town Board decided on April 19 that it would grant rugby league the use of Jellicoe Park until 3pm on Saturday's and rugby the use of it beyond this hour. The Papakura club enquired with the council as to where the floodlights were that we supposed to be installed at Prince Edward Park but whose whereabouts were unknown. On October 15 the club gave a complimentary dinner to the members of the senior B team in honour of their achievements. The dinner was held in Pegler's building with “a good number of members [making] the journey to Manurewa, where they were joined by Manurewa supporters. Les McVeigh, the president of the club welcomed the chairman of the Auckland junior control board, Mr. D. Wilkie, secretary Mr. M. W. Clarke, Mr. I. Stonex, assistant secretary, and also Mr. J. Edwards who was representing the Manurewa Town Board. Norman Widdowson thanked the league for all their assistance to the club. Wilkie replied that they always looked forward to attending the Papakura club functions and that the Papakura club was the main reason the senior B grade even existed. He also said that there was a possibility of the club moving to the senior A grade and that as a club they were ranked “among the first three clubs in Auckland”. Clarke said he was of the opinion that “Papakura was the next club to get among the senior clubs, ...[and that the club should] not supply players to city clubs but keep them in its own club and territory”. They held their annual club picnic at McNicol's farm at Clevedon on December 12 with over 400 in attendance. 10 lorries were required to transport everybody there. I. Wilson won the senior B 100 yard race.
- Point Chevalier League Football Club
- Ponsonby United Football Club held their annual meeting on February 22. There was a “good attendance of players and supporters present with Mr. R. Francis presiding. The club report said that the acquisition of a social hall and clubrooms had proved a big success during the previous season. The senior team was presented with the Stuart Cup for being the most successful team in the club after they won the Phelan Shield in the knockout competition. They had been coached by Bert Cooke. The club was showing a “substantial profit, and assets amounted to £488, while there were no liabilities”. The following officers were elected; Patron, Mr A. Adams; president, Mr F Harrison; executive committee, Messrs R Francis, J Armstrong, A Barnett, Frank Delgrosso, D Maloney; honorary secretary, Mr M Campbell, honorary treasurer Mr L Adams; selector and coach, Mr Bert Cooke; club captain, A McIntyre, with twenty three vice-presidents re-elected. It was later rumoured that Cooke would not coach Ponsonby and would in fact coach a rugby union club side but this was denied at the Auckland Control Board meeting of March 17. It was then reported that he was going to be an honorary ‘coach’ for the North Shore Rugby Football Club but was still the official coach of Ponsonby Rugby League Club.
- Richmond Rovers Football Club held their 23rd annual meeting at the Gaiety Hall in Grey Lynn on March 2 with Mr B.W. Davis presiding. Mention was made of the number of teams the club fielded in the previous season and the fact that they retained the Davis Points Shield. Congratulations was extended to R Powell, W Tittleton, and E Mincham on their selection in the New Zealand side. The club had assets worth £216 17/ and had a credit balance of £143 7/. Club captain A. Hyland was retiring and gave a speech on their various teams and awarded the Harry Johns Memorial Cup to the sixth grade winners. Mr W. Mincham's special cap for goal-kicking was awarded to E. McCarthy (seventh grade), who kicked 40 goals in 17 matches. Tribute was also paid to Mr. W.A. Swift, who had been associated with the club for 21 years as a player and as an official and he was gifted a “substantial piece of furniture”. The following officers were elected: patron, Mr. W.J. Holdsworth; vice-patron, Mr. J. Redwood, sen; president, Mr. B. W. Davis; vice-presidents, same as last year, with three new nominations; chairman, Mr. W. A. Swift; honorary secretary and treasurer, Mr W.R. Dick; club captain, Mr. Ralph Jenkinson; manager of senior team, Mr. A. Hyland; schools’ delegate, Mr. C. Rowe; auditor, Mr. J.A. Redwood. In June the Richmond club made enquiries with regards to touring New South Wales but was told it was unlikely as the league there could not accommodate them on the desired dates. The trip was cancelled entirely in mid July after the dates suggested were considered too late for Richmond to be able to earn enough money to cover their expenses.
- R.V. Rugby League Football Club Held their annual meeting in early March. They were a company team for Harvey and Sons. Harvey later merged and became part of Carter Holt Harvey. The following officers were elected: Chairman, Mr. E Muller; patron, Mr. A.G. Harvey; vice presidents, Messrs, D. Harvey, W. Harvey sen, W. Harvey jun, A Harvey jun, C Hamilton, J. McGeehan, E Griffiths, W. Rabbidge, C. Smith, R. Parr, A. Cloke; secretary, Mr. G Dines; treasurer, Mr. F.W. Day; selector coaches, Mr. T. Shearer (second grade), and Mr. E. Knight (third grade); committee to represent each factory, Messrs, R. Parr and E Knight (Victoria Street), Messrs T. Shearer and J. Salter (Albert Street), Messrs. W. Halverson and A. Brown (King's Drive); delegate, Mr. R. Parr; deputy delegate, Mr. G. Dines; official linesmen, Messrs, J. Salter (second grade), and W. Halverson (third grade).

== Senior grade registrations and transfers ==
At North Shore Albions annual meeting on March 17 they stated that a number of new players were enrolled, including Ivor Stirling of Northland.

At the board of control meeting on April 14 the following senior registrations were approved, Transfers: Cliff Satherley from Richmond to Mount Albert; R.H. Ferrall from Mount Albert to Newton; C Cairns, Pukemiro to Mount Albert; R McGreal, Ngaruawahia to Marist (subject to approval by the New Zealand Council. On April 20 C.C. Murton was transferred from Ellersie 3rd grade to Manukau seniors. On April 21 ten players were registered with two of them including L.C. Bain a well known Otago runner and ex-member of the Union club in Dunedin, and William J. McCallum, a North Auckland athlete. Transfers were: D.E. Keane from Marist to Ponsonby. S.W. Sherson was reinstated with E Tremain (South Auckland) being cleared to join North Shore.

On May 5 the following transfers were granted:- J.W. Donald from North Shore Albions to City Rovers; C.R. Phillips from Otahuhu senior B to Manukau; J. Stannaway, Otahuhu senior B to Marist reserves; E.W.H. Barfoot, Marist reserves to Ponsonby reserves; J Shadbolt, Newton reserves to Glenora; P. Awhitu and P. Kauhoa, City to R.V; K Nicolson, Richmond thirds to Marist reserves; F Deason, Ponsonby reserves to R.V. On May 12 the following registrations were granted: H. Crook and Frederick Hollis with Newton, Norman F. Drew with Mount Albert, and P. C. N. Strickland with Marist. The following were transferred: H. Crook (North Shore to Newton), G Newton (Petone to Newton). While Alf Broadhead of Richmond was cleared to play in Wellington subject to approval by the New Zealand Council. On May 17 P Wickham and A McDonald were regraded from Glenora Senior B to 3rd grade. On May 19 the following transfers were granted: H. E. Neale (Papakura to Ponsonby reserves), E. Donovan (Marist to City reserves), Walter Preston (Mount Albert to Newton reserves). T.C.G. Pierce (One Tree Hill Point Club in Whangarei to Newton reserves), and Noel Messenger (Central Club in Wellington to Newton). E Tackle was regraded from North Shore reserves to Richmond senior B. James Tristram from the Waikato was registered with Mount Albert while M.J.L. West was reinstated (he had previously played with Ellerslie. At the meeting of the junior management on May 25 A. McDonald was regraded from Glenora senior B to 3rd grade as was S.G. Johnson of Otahuhu. On May 26 the following players were registered: A. Smith, F.W. Just, A Bullat (City); C.R. Coburn, D.J. Thomas (North Shore); S.J. Davis, S.J. Murfitt, S Owens (Ponsonby).

On June 2 F. R. Halsey was transferred from Mount Albert to Marist while L. Conway was cleared to play for Mount Albert. K Campbell was registered with City, T.C. Allen and R Dunster with Manukau, and I Cruickshank with North Shore. On June 15 J.H. Shadbolt transferred from Glenora senior B to Mount Albert, while Roy Avery transferred from Newton 3rd grade to R.V. senior B. On June 17 J. O’Brien of Marist was transferred to South Auckland. In late June L.H. Cootes joined the Ponsonby club. He was the brother of Joe Cootes, the New Zealand international. L.H. Cootes was a former Horowhenua rugby representative and weighed 15st 4lb. On June 30 C.H. Lacey of the Grafton rugby club was registered with City Rovers.

On July 7 the following transfers were approved: Frank Pickrang (Manukau to Ponsonby), G Ellis (from Newton to Mount Albert and regraded to senior B). G Hamilton's clearance from Newton to Marist was granted. S Bluett was registered with City, S.A. and J.W. Prendergast with Ponsonby. On July 13 R.S. Pyke was transferred from Papakura senior B to R.V. On July 14 R.L. Best was granted a transfer from City senior B to Mount Albert senior B.A. Hamilton was registered with Mount Albert, while G. Radcliffe was regraded from Richmond senior reserves to senior B. On July 21 I. Wilson was granted a transfer from Mount Albert seniors, and lately St George (Wellington) to Papakura senior B.

On August 24 E Gifford was granted a transfer from Mount Albert senior B to Richmond senior B.
