= 1936 Auckland Rugby League season =

Auckland Rugby League season

The 1936 Auckland Rugby League season was its 28th. The Fox Memorial was won by Manukau in their first season back in the senior A grade as a stand-alone club since the early 1910s. They also won the Roope Rooster competition when they defeated City Rovers 23 to 10 in the final. Richmond Rovers finished runners up in the Fox Memorial and earned the right to play Manukau for the Stormont Shield. Richmond won the trophy after beating Manukau 30–9 in the Stormont Shield clash. Richmond also won the Phelan Shield after they had been knocked out of the Roope Rooster in the first round. They beat Marist Old Boys 13–9 in the final.

By accumulating the most points in the second round of the Fox competition Ponsonby United won the Thistle Cup. Mount Albert United won the senior reserve championship (Norton Cup) which was the first senior title in their history. Marist won the reserve grade knockout competition (Stallard Cup). The senior B grade (Sharman Cup) was won by Papakura who went unbeaten throughout the season. They also won the Walmsley Shield by going unbeaten in the extra round played for that trophy. Point Chevalier won the senior B knockout competition after they defeated Green Lane 22–9 in the final.

Auckland played 3 representative fixtures with the first 2 played on the same day, when they fielded 2 teams against separate opponents. The opposition was Tāmaki (Auckland Māori) who they lost to 30–21, and Wellington who they beat 25–22. The highlight of their season was the match against the touring Great Britain played in front of 14,000 at Carlaw Park. Great Britain had recently spent 8 weeks in Australia where they won the test series 2–1 and 14 of their 17 tour matches. Auckland played well but went down 16–22.

Aside from their match with Auckland, the Tāmaki (Auckland Māori) team played Waikato Māori on June 15 and lost 30–43 at Te Kohanga, and had a win over Northland Māori (Takahiwai) 39–15 in a match for the Waitangi Shield. Jack Hemi, the New Zealand Māori rugby representative had switched codes and played all 3 matches for them. They were scheduled to play a fourth match against Waikato Māori for the Waitangi Shield but owing to the awful weather around that time, and the desire to protect the Carlaw Park surface from any further damage before the touring Great Britain sides matches the game was cancelled.

Preceded by 1935	28th Auckland Rugby League season 1936	Succeeded by 1937

== Auckland Rugby League meetings and news ==
=== Club teams by grade participation ===
Team	Fox Memorial	Senior Reserves	Senior B	2nd	3rd	4th	5th	6th	7th	Schoolboys	Total
Richmond Rovers	1	1	0	1	1	1	1	1	1	4	12
Mount Albert United	1	1	0	1	1	1	0	0	0	3	8
Devonport United	1	1	0	0	1	1	1	0	0	2	7
Marist Old Boys	1	1	0	0	1	1	0	0	1	2	7
Newton Rangers	1	1	0	0	1	0	1	0	0	3	7
Otahuhu Rovers	0	0	1	0	1	0	1	0	2	2	7
Manukau Rovers	1	1	0	1	1	0	0	0	0	2	6
City Rovers	1	1	0	0	1	1	0	1	1	0	6
Ponsonby United	1	1	0	0	1	1	0	0	0	2	6
Papakura	0	0	1	0	1	0	1	2	1	0	6
Point Chevalier	0	0	1	0	2	1	0	0	1	0	5
Northcote & Birkenhead Ramblers	0	0	0	0	1	0	1	0	1	2	5
Ellerslie United	0	0	0	0	1	1	0	0	1	2	5
Green Lane	0	0	1	0	1	0	0	1	0	2	5
Glenora	0	0	0	1	1	0	1	0	1	0	4
Avondale	0	0	0	0	0	0	0	1	0	2	3
RV	0	0	0	1	1	0	0	0	0	0	2
Balmoral	0	0	0	0	0	0	0	0	0	2	2
Waiuku	0	0	1	0	0	0	0	0	0	0	1
Total	8	8	5	5	17	8	7	6	9	40	113

=== Annual meeting ===
On February 26 the ARL met to discuss several issues and to decide on an approximate date for the annual meeting. It was recommended to play a benefit match for Jim Laird of the Marist Old Boys who had been in hospital suffering from a leg injury since the New Zealand – Australia match late in the previous season. It was also stressed that the percentage of money earned given to clubs should increase so that they can promote increased organisation in the sport. Mr. D. Wilkie said it was felt that senior clubs were not catering sufficiently for juniors and the junior board considered that the constitution should compel each club to have at least three junior teams. On March 25 at a board of control meeting several clubs were reported to have altered their uniforms following last year's official suggestion due to colour clashes in many matches.

The annual general meeting was held on April 6. Mr. G. Grey Campbell stated that "if the rugby league public, clubs and players were enthusiastic last year, they are now more than doubly so; in fact, abounding with a confidence that augurs well for the approaching season". Mr. Harold Walmsley was in attendance and was thanked for his generosity with rugby league for many years and for donating his 21st trophy to the game which would be known as the Tracy Inglis football. Dr. Inglis had been associated with the game as a prominent medical officer. It was later decided to allocate the trophy as an award for junior clubs only for competition on similar lines to the Davis Points Shield.

The following officers were elected to the board:- Patron, Mr. J.B. Donald; vice-patron, Mr. J.F.W. Dickson; president, John A. Lee (M.P.); vice presidents, Messrs. E. Davis, R.D. Bagnall, J. Bellamy, R. Benson, O. Blackwood, John Donald, C. Drysdale, H. Grange, R.J. Laird, W.J. Lovett, E. Montgomery, T.G. Symonds, Joe Sayegh, C. Seagar, Bill Schram (M.P.), W. Wallace, Harold Walmsley, R.H. Wood, G.T. Wright, and H.W. Brien; chairman, Mr. G. Grey Campbell; vice-chairman, Ted Phelan; club delegates on the control board, Messrs. Jim Rukutai and J.W. Probert; referee delegate, Mr. William Mincham; junior board delegate, Mr. D. Wilkie. At the meeting of the control board which followed the following appointments were confirmed:- Hon. secretary, Mr. Ivan Culpan; hon. treasurer, Mr. J.E. Knowling; hon. solicitor, Mr. H.M. Rogerson; hon. Physicians, Drs. Tracy Inglis, M.G. Pezaro, F.J. Gwynne, K.H. Holdgate, J.N. Waddell, H. Burrell and G.W. Lock; hon. masseur, Mr. F. Flanagan; auditor, Mr. R.A. Spinley; Press steward, Mr. R. Doble; referees' appointment board delegate, Mr. L. Binns; New Zealand Council delegate, Mr. R. Doble; finance committee, the chairman, secretary and Messrs. J.W. Probert and William Mincham; insurance committee, Messrs. Doble, Binns and D Wilkie; emergency committee, chairman, secretary and Mr. Jim Rukutai; grounds chairman, secretary and Mr. Binns.

The gross receipts were £3,298 13s 9d and were an increase of £500 on the previous season. During the season ground rents due to the hire of Carlaw Park were increased by £71 17s 6d. Players benefited by insurance to the extent of £70 17s. The greatest increase in expenditure was maintenance of Carlaw Park, which amounted to £353 6s 6d. A sum of £520 was granted to senior clubs as gate percentages, which was a record since clubs had benefited from such payments.

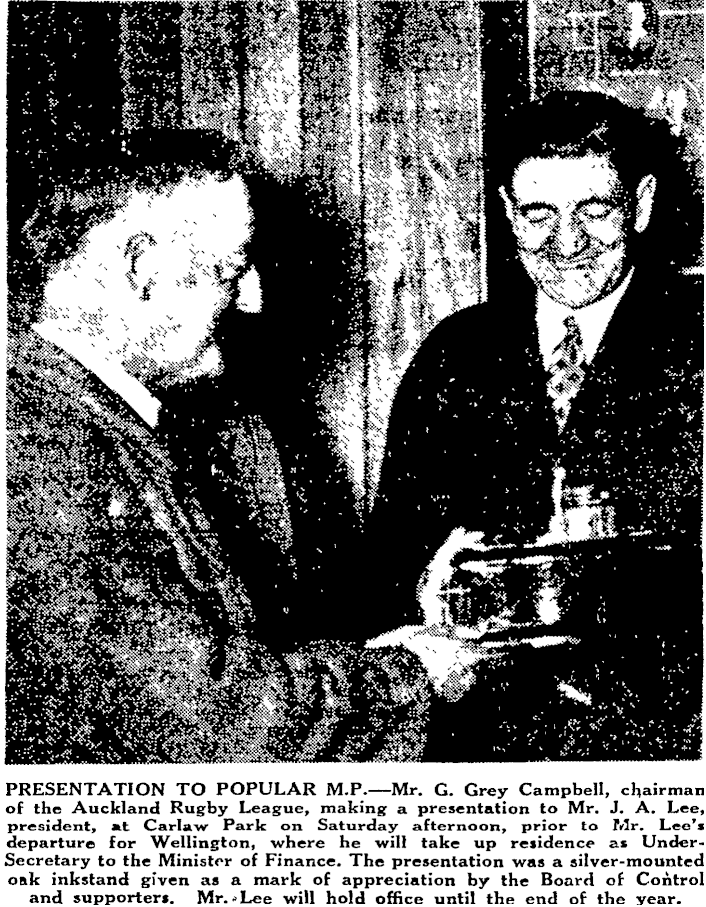

It was decided to begin the season on 18 April and a "substantial portion" of the gate would be donated to Jim Laird, the Marist player who was still recovering from an injury received playing for New Zealand the previous season. Senior premiership matches would start on May 2. On September 12 during the break between Roope Rooster games at Carlaw Park John A. Lee was presented with a silver mounted oak inkstand by officials of Auckland Rugby League. Lee was an M.P. and was being elevated to Parliamentary Under-Secretary in charge of the State housing scheme. This required him to spend a lot more time in Wellington and he would be relinquishing the presidency of Auckland Rugby League at the end of the season. Lee said "I love the game and I like the people associated with it"... "what ever can do for the league code will be done, not because of politics, but because I love league football".

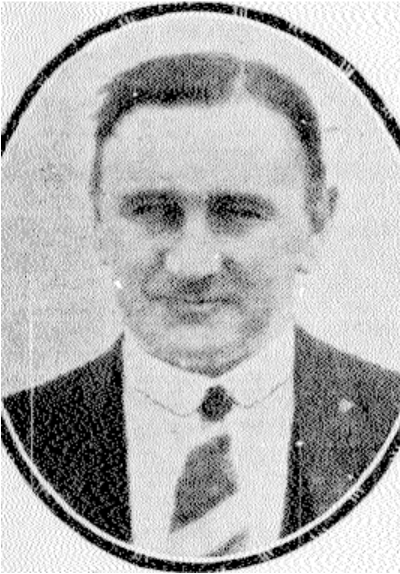
Ivan Culpan, long serving secretary of Auckland Rugby League from 1918 to 1936 (continuing until at least 1945)

Ivan Culpan was then presented with a dressing table set for his work making all the ground arrangements at Carlaw Park throughout the recent English tour. Mr. Culpan said that his work for the league since he became secretary in 1918 had been his hobby.

=== Honours board ===
At the annual meeting on April 6 it was decided to compile and hang and honours board at the ARL head office. It would include the names of all "living officials who have a record of 25 years and over in the service of the code in Auckland". Those present at the meeting who would qualify were William Mincham, Messrs. E.K. Asher (City Rovers) and A. Ferguson (Devonport), 27 years; Jim Rukutai (control board) and William James Liversidge (NZ Council), 26 years; Ivan Culpan (ARL secretary), and Pro. Henry (Newton Rangers), 25 years. The board was being donated by Mr. R.H. Wood who was thanked at a board of control meeting on April 15. It was decided to write to all clubs asking them to "supply the names of members or officials who have 25 years' record of active connection with the game in playing and official capacity".

=== Carlaw Park ===
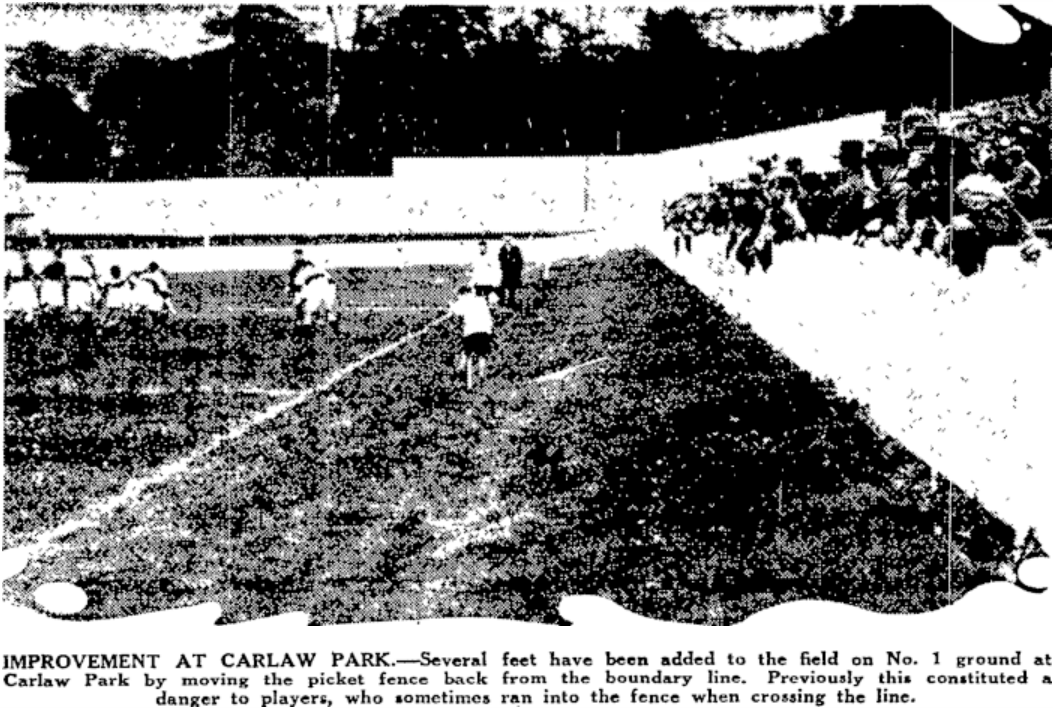
The newly located picket fence in front of the terraces.

At the February 26 meeting of the ARL the board agreed to erect higher goal posts at Carlaw Park. They also decided to make permanent accommodation there for the Mount Albert United Club. Chairman Campbell at the pre-season ARL meeting said that the ground space had extended the ground space by 12 feet in width by the setting back of the picket fence at the foot of the terrace which meant "the danger of players being thrown against the terrace fence had been greatly minimised". They had also formed steps behind the stand leading to the hill. The turf has also been top dressed, and made more even than it had formerly been. It was also discussed that a round of night games in early April could be played and this was supported by several delegates. A by-law had come into place whereby "theatres and other places of amusement capable of seating 500 or more people" would have to have firemen in attendance. In the past the by-law did not operate in regards to sports organisations. From May 1 firemen would be supplied directly by the Auckland Metropolitan Fire Board. New Zealand was transitioning to a 40-hour work week meaning that many people would no longer be working half days on Saturday. Mr. G. Grey Campbell said if Saturday were a universal holiday the league would "undoubtedly take full advantage of it. Reserve grade games might well be played in the morning. Furthermore, opportunity could be taken to have senior B matches played on Saturday morning at Carlaw Park" which had been a difficulty up to this point. The grounds executive submitted a report to the board that a start had been made by May 20 on the formation of tea rooms near the grandstand as part of the programme of improvements in preparation for the visit of the British team. It was reported at the May 27 meeting of the board of control that Mr. Early had donated a board for display at Carlaw Park which would show the senior team placings in the competition from week to week. It was reported at the same meeting that after 4 rounds the gate takings were far in excess of anything since 1931. It was decided at a meeting on June 1 to purchase special whistles for referees on the #2 field because there was sometimes confusion when a whistle was blown as to which field it related to.

=== Senior team prospects for the season ===
On April 13 the Auckland Star reported on various teams prospects for the season. The New Zealand Herald did the same on April 29. Marist had secured Mr. Con Hall as selector/coach to replace Charles Gregory. Gregory was moving to an outer district and would not be able to do commute. Hall had been a national selector the previous season and was leaving the West Coast. They would still have Dan Keane, Joe Woods, Carter, Bill Breed (formerly of Otahuhu Rovers), and hooker Jim O'Kane, with John Anderson the West Coast Rugby League representative forward joining their ranks. Norm Campbell, Vincent Bakalich, Sidney Loader, Arthur Furlonger, George Kerr, James (Jimmy) Chalmers and William Glover would also be on hand to play in the backs. Robert (Bob) Aro was joining them from the Technical Old Boys rugby club.

Richmond Rovers were losing Bert Cooke who was retiring and moving to coach Ponsonby United. They were acquiring George Tittleton, the international player from the Waikato along with his brother Walter who had also debuted for New Zealand in the first test against Australia in 1935. They would play alongside Eric Fletcher and Roy Powell with Ted Mincham, Alf Mitchell, Ernest McNeil and Noel Bickerton also in the backs. The forwards were rumoured to see Bill Telford, the Satherley brothers (Jack and Cliff), Alfred Broadhead, Harold Tetley and Ray Lawless along with Hermes Hadley who was returning from the Foster Club in Australia. Though Lawless retired from the rugby league game and left Auckland for the Hawkes Bay area.

City Rovers would again be led by outstanding New Zealand player Lou Brown. City would have forwards Stan Clark, James Herring, William McLaughlan, James Dye, Steve Watene, John Magee, and Bowman. Harry Wayne was returning from Taranaki (though he a short time later moved to South Africa), and Jackie Rata was joining from South Auckland rugby (Tuakau) along with T Allen, the Waikato rugby fullback. Ex-Wairarapa player Ford was also expected to join City's ranks. Cyril Wiberg, Jack Tawhai, Arnold Porteous, Herbert Thompson were likely to make up the backs. Arnold Porteous was moving across from the Marist rugby side, though he had previously played for Newton Rangers.

Newton Rangers, holders of the Roope Rooster trophy were confident of success and would be wearing new uniforms supplied by the St Helens club in England via former players who were playing there. Claude Dempsey would be in the backs again along with Pat Young, the Brimble brothers (Ted and Wilfred), Frederick Sissons (promoted from the juniors), Hugh Brady, and Luois Schlesinger. Knott from the Ponsonby rugby team was also joining the backs. In the forwards R.A. Johnson, Ray Middleton, A. Nathan, Cyril Clemm, Watson and Reginald Kelsall would play, with John Ginders transferring from Richmond with Lou Hutt joining from Ponsonby. Emanuel, Merrick (returning from North Auckland), and Mackin would also be in the forward pack with a brother of Mount Albert's Richard Shadbolt joining. Watson from Northern Wairoa rugby and a Hawke's Bay representative would be another addition to the pack.

Mount Albert performed brilliantly in their first ever season in the season finishing runners-up. Tom Haddon was selector again and it was understood that international player T. Campbell would lead the reserve grade side. Huck Flannagan, Des Herring, Bruce Constable, Joseph Gunning and Richard Shadbolt would be in the forwards again with Peterson, the Hawke's Bay rugby representative joining the loose forwards. Other players joining Mount Albert included Elwin from Manukau rugby, J. O'Brien from South Auckland (Waikato) along with "several others". They had also gained the services of Watkins' the Grafton rugby halfback. Len Schultz was re-joining the side from York in England with Pawson rumoured to be joining from South Auckland. Bert Schultz would play on one wing with Ray Halsey joining from the Otahuhu senior B side. Robert Morrissey would again be in the fullback position.

Ponsonby were being coached by Bert Cooke. Arthur Kay, Brian Riley and Frank Halloran would again be in the backs. Devonport United were rumoured to be gathering their best team for several years and had former New Zealand international Bert Laing in charge of their senior side. Edgar Morgan who had played for Grammar Old Boys was also changing codes as was Davis, from the Grafton club, he had been a member of the Auckland B team. Dreaver and Blood were also named as two promising young forwards. Another player to switch codes and join Ponsonby was Frank Paton.

Devonport saw the return of backs C Rhodes, J.C. Cowan, Cliff Hall, and Len Scott. They were being strengthened by the inclusion of Gordon, a junior rugby five-eighth. Kennedy, J Greenwood and Parkinson were also joining the side from the rugby ranks. In the forwards Reg Hallows was another rugby convert from Northland and was joining first team regulars John Donald, Hugh Simpson, Horace Hunt, Tony Milicich, Arthur Sowter, and Ted Scott.

=== Non-replacement rule ===
Following a decision by the New Zealand Council that the non-replacement rule be enforced the Auckland Rugby League was forced to adhere to it more stringently. Previously teams would be allowed to replace an injured player in the first half but the rule was now being brought into line with the way it was enforced in England where no player may be replaced at all. Considerable debate took place at the meeting with Jim Rukutai and Mr. J.W. Probert saying that "the present rule allowing replacements up to half-time seemed to be working well". Rukutai said that "the enforcement of the rule might spoil matters and be a handicap". Mr. Doble said that the enforcement of the rule might "do considerable good and compel increased fitness by players and teams". Chairman Campbell said it would be unfair to "spring the rules on the clubs Saturday", so it was decided to bring the rule in for the round 4 matches the week after. At the May 20 meeting of the control board four clubs (Newton Rangers, Ponsonby United, Devonport United, and Marist Old Boys) all wrote letters strongly opposing the rule. The other clubs were also against the rule, as were the schools' management and the junior control board. All who spoke were in agreement that the league could use its discretion and not apply the rule to club competition and that the rule should only be used for representative matches. Mr. Doble suggested that they trial the rule that weekend and then apply for dispensation but chairman Campbell said that "the risk of upsetting the games and the public was too great. It was preferable in the circumstances to offend the council than for games to be spoilt for the public through becoming one-sided as the result of any injury to players". It was then decided to rescind the rule change.

=== Admission of Manukau Rovers club into the senior competition ===
At the ARL control board meeting on April 29 the Manukau Rovers were admitted to the senior championship first grade competition. This was their first appearance in it since 1913 though they did field a combined team with a Mangere club in 1924 before switching en masse to the rugby code the same year. In 1932 the club was revived but mainly fielded teams in the junior grades. One of the requirements for their readmittance in the first grade was that they were not allowed to take any senior players from other Auckland clubs. One exception was made when the City club sportingly allowed Steve Watene to move across to Manukau and be their captain for the season. Jack Hemi and Joe Broughton left the rugby union code where they were playing for Wairarapa, and Horowhenua - Manawatu respectively and joined the Manukau club prior to the start of the season. Both were representative players with Hemi also having played for the Maori All Blacks. Thomas Trevarthan then joined the team for their second round match. Trevarthan was a rugby player from Otago and he went on the represent New Zealand in his debut league season. In addition Len Kawe, Angus Gault, and Frank Pickrang all King County rugby representatives joined Manukau early in the season. Towards the end of the season Manukau signed Jack Brodrick who was honoured with the best forward award following the New Zealand Maori rugby union tour of Australia. Tragedy struck Manukau immediately following their first win of the season against Richmond in round 2. Mr. Albert Cowan, who had founded the team joined them in the dressing room to congratulate them but collapsed and could not be revived. The players and patrons were "distressed when the news was confirmed, and flags lowered to half-mast. The Manukau reserve team which was playing a later game at the Domain found out during their match which was then abandoned.

=== Junior insurance scheme ===
A compulsory junior insurance scheme, controlled by the ARL was to be brought in for the 1936 season. Mr. Wilkie said that clubs had been involved in its idea and implementation. It would involve an increase in the player registration fee and see insurance and the first doctor's expenses met.

=== Broadcasting of matches ===
It was decided to continue broadcasting matches prior to the commencement of the season. On May 30 (round 5) the first of the matches was broadcast on 1ZB. The Friendly Road station had been off air for some time for "urgent repairs and overhaul". "Griffo", who was the station's sports announcer, was to be the commentator.

=== Annual prize-giving ===
On 16 November the Auckland Rugby League held their annual prize giving at the Auckland Town Hall. Mr. E.J. Phelan congratulated the players and officials on the season and paid tribute to the championship winning Manukau side. Mr. G. Grey Campbell said that it was a pleasure to be associated with the clubs this season and thanked the control board for the "earnest co-operation of club officials [and that] the valuable assistance rendered by the ladies' committee was a feature of the successful social side of the Auckland League's activities. Mr. Phelan then presented the trophies and caps won by teams and players.

=== Obituaries ===
==== Arthur Singe ====
Arthur Singe played for Marist Old Boys in 1921, and again from 1924 to 1926 after a spell out of Auckland for work. He made 48 appearances for them in total and scored 140 points from 22 tries and 37 goals. Singe originally played rugby union, representing the Marist Old Boys rugby club after returning from World War 1. He had represented the New Zealand Army side which played a large number of games in Europe late in the war and after it had ceased. Singe was a fast wing forward who was regularly hailed as a "match winner" and widely considered to be a brilliant footballer. He toured South Africa with the NZ Army side on their way back to New Zealand in 1919. In 1920 Singe represented Auckland at rugby in 8 matches along with 1 appearance for the North Island side, and was considered unlucky not to make the New Zealand team. Soon after missing selection he switched to rugby league. He represented Auckland 15 times from 1921 to 1926. Singe was selected to play for New Zealand in 1925 against the touring Queensland side, and was then chosen for the ill-fated 1926–27 tour of England and Wales. Singe was part of a group of players who refused to play at two points of the tour due to their objection to the selections and coaching of Ernest Mair. Upon his return he, along with the other strikers was banned from rugby league for life. Singe had received a life ban from rugby union for switching to rugby league and so could no longer play in either code. In 1962 the New Zealand Rugby League administration lifted the ban on Singe and his 6 teammates however Singe had been dead for 26 years by this time. Singe died on January 5, 1936, after suffering ill health likely related to the war and was buried at Waikumete Cemetery.

==== Thomas Wells ====
Thomas (William Godfrey) Wells had arrived in Auckland around 1929 and became a delegate for the Parnell club on their junior and senior management committees of the ARL. He was killed in a motorcycle accident on Franklin Road, Ponsonby on March 14 when his motorcycle veered off the road and crashed into a tree. He "received the full force of the impact on his head", and was taken away in an ambulance to Auckland Hospital but was pronounced dead on arrival. He was married with no children and aged just 36. He was buried at Hillsborough Cemetery on March 17.

==== Albert Cowan ====
On May 9 Mr. Albert Askin Cowan collapsed and died in the Manukau dressing room following their win against Richmond at Carlaw Park. He was a founder of the Manukau side and their secretary, and was absolutely instrumental along with Puti Tipene Watene in the rebuilding of the club in recent seasons. He had been a "keen stalwart of the rugby league code for many years, and was responsible for the organisation of the Ellerslie United and Otahuhu Rovers clubs when Ellerslie attained senior rank". He was also a member of the Manukau Cruising Club. Mr. Cowan was born in Port Chalmers in 1880, and resided at Selwyn Street, South Onehunga. He was "survived by Mrs. Cowan, a son who is an invalid and two daughters". He was 57 years of age. Cowan's funeral was held on the morning of May 12 in Onehunga at the Church of the Assumption. Over 50 vehicles made up the cortege with the pall-bearers Messrs, G. Love, Angus Gault, Steve Watene, and G. Zanovich. All sections of the Auckland Rugby League were represented, including Mr. G. Grey Campbell and E.J. Phelan.

==== John Stormont ====
John Stormont died in September. He was a trustee of Auckland Rugby League for 8 years and was a part donor of the Stormont Memorial Shield in honour of his son who played for the New Zealand side and died aged 26 from rheumatic heart disease in 1925. When news reached the meeting of the ARL Mr. Campbell said "the passing of such a widely respected citizen and trustee of the game in this city would be widely deplored. John Stormont was aged 73 and was survived by his wife and seven sons.

=== Special opening matches ===
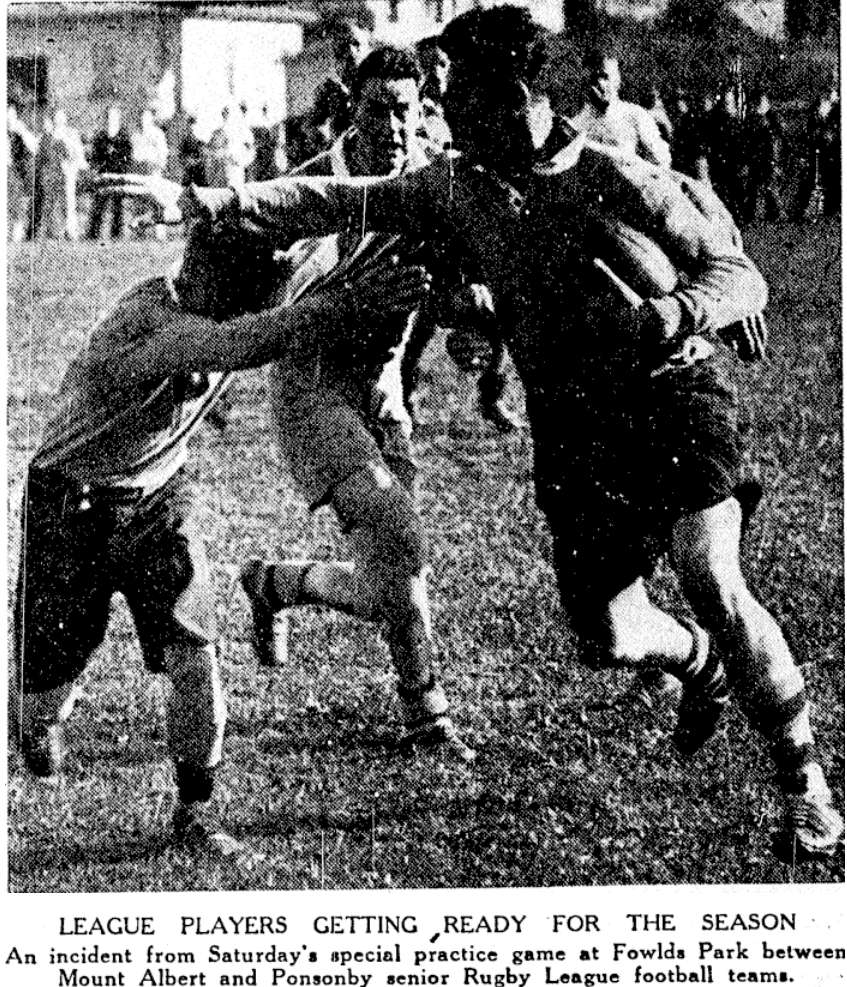
Mt Albert v Ponsonby on April 4 in a practice game at Fowlds Park, Mt Albert's home ground.

On April 18 a special round of matches were played to open the season. The proceeds were divided between the clubs and a benefit fund for Jim Laird, the Marist international player who was injured in a New Zealand match late in the 1935 season. In the match between Richmond and Mount Albert, a Richmond forward was ordered off (though the newspapers did not state who the player was) and was suspended for four weeks. There were four matches played at Carlaw Park. The Manukau senior side had yet to be admitted at this point and so Devonport played the Pukemiro team from the South Auckland league. The same weekend Papakura defeated Point Chevalier in a pre-season match at Papakura by 38 points to 5. Former rugby representative player, Reginald Haslam was on debut for Marist after switching codes. He would represent Auckland in a match later in the season.

==== Matches ====
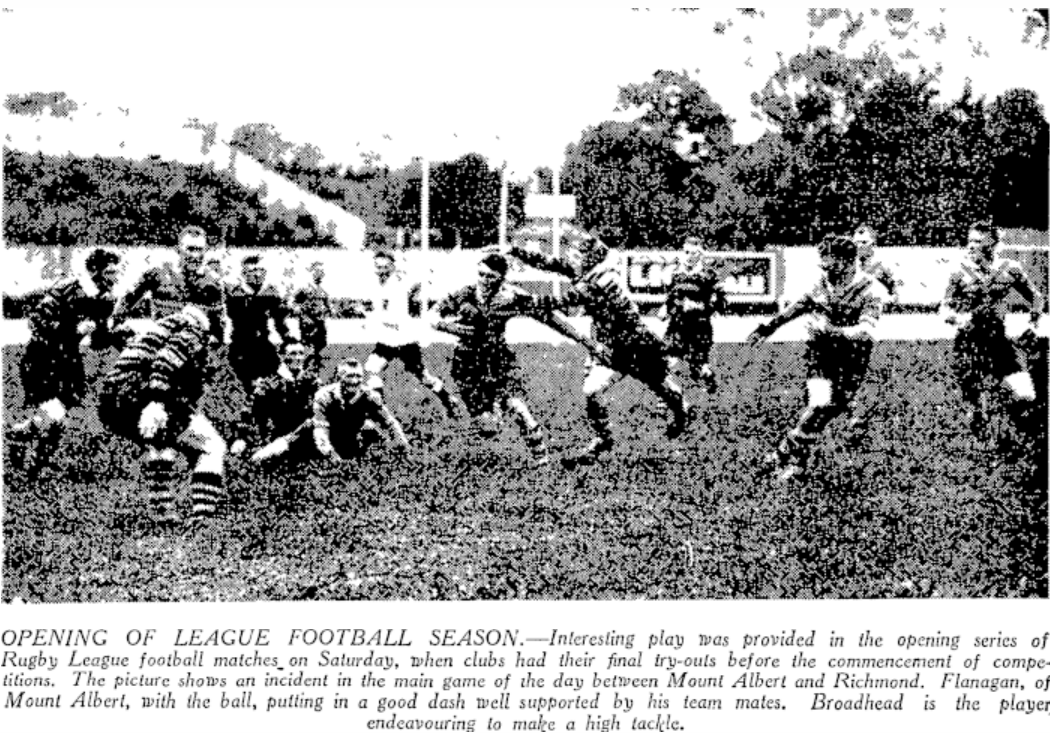
Mt Albert hooker Huck Flanagan with the ball being tackled by Alf Broadhead of Richmond.

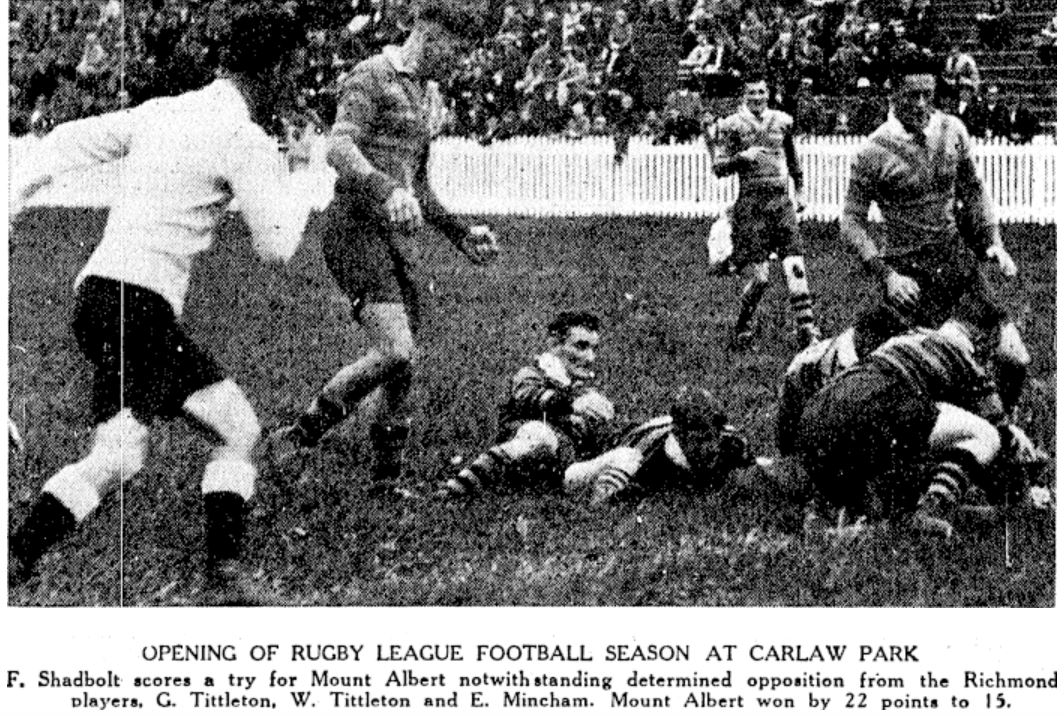
George Tittleton on his back, and brother Wally on his front trying to stop Richard Shadbolt (Mt Albert) from scoring.

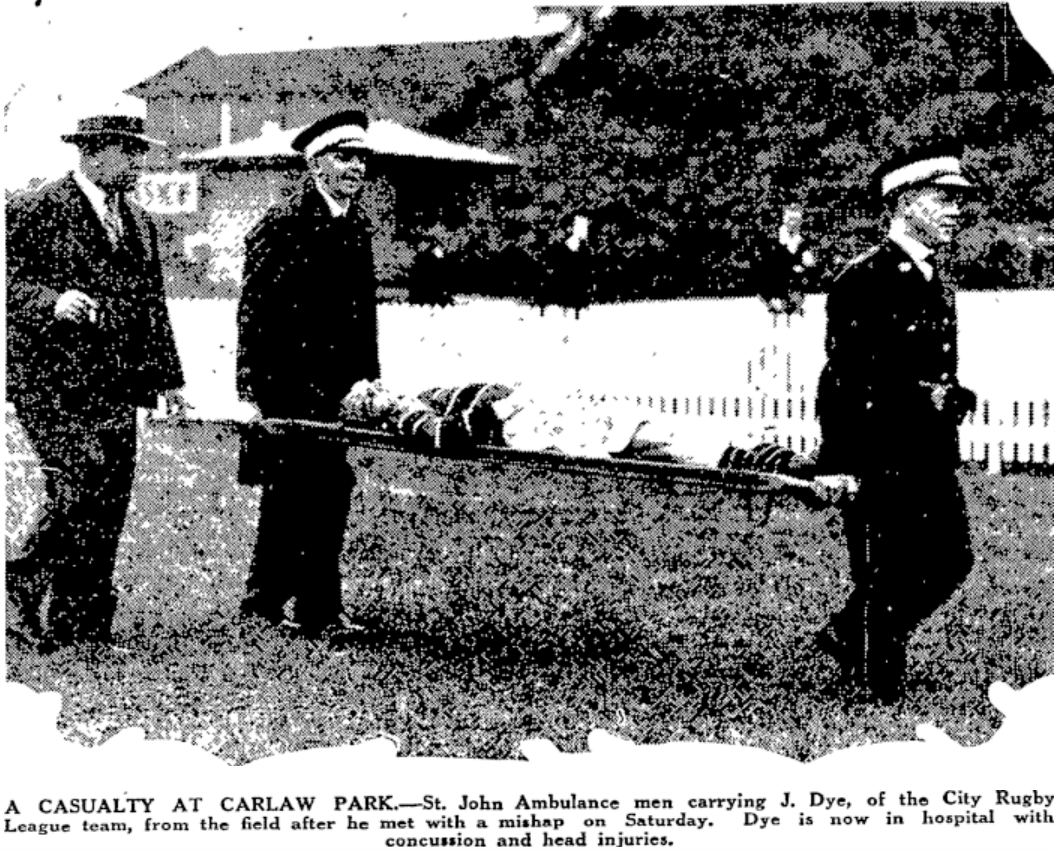
James Dye (City) being stretchered from the field.

Thomas Pawson, the South Auckland representative five eighth debuted for Mt Albert and scored a try. The match between Marist and Newton was refereed by Percy Rogers who was refereeing at least his 100th senior grade match since his debut in 1924. James Dye a City forward received a bad head injury and was taken to Auckland Hospital suffering from concussion. He was able to return to work on the Tuesday. For Richmond in their match with Mount Albert, their winger Ronald Couper injured his knee which had previously caused him trouble.

18 April	Marist	15-5	Newton	Carlaw Park 1
1:45	Try: John Anderson, Robert Aro, Reginald Haslam; Con: John Anderson, Robert Aro; Pen: John Anderson		Try: Wilfred Brimble; Con: Wilfred Brimble	Referee: Percy Rogers

18 April	Mount Albert	22-15	Richmond	Carlaw Park 1
3:00	Try: Bruce Constable, Ray Halsey, Richard Shadbolt, Len Schultz, Thomas Pawson, Stewart; Con: Des Herring; Pen: Robert Morrissey		Try: Ronald Couper, Wally Tittleton, Owen Wilkie; Con: Cliff Satherley, George Tittleton; Pen: Cliff Satherley	Referee: Stuart Billman

18 April	Ponsonby	21-17	City	Carlaw Park 2
3:00	Try: Selwyn Davis, Arthur Kay, Thomas Holland, Bert Leatherbarrow, Frank Halloran; Con: Frank Paton 3		Try: Jack Tawhai 2, Stan Clark, Jack Rata, Arnold Porteous; Con: Cyril Wiberg	Referee: Wilfred Simpson

18 April	Devonport	7-5	Pukemiro (Waikato)	Devonport Domain
3:00	Try: Len Scott; Con: Tony Milicich; Pen: Tony Milicich		Try: Rodger; Pen: Don Pitt	Referee: Ralph Otto

== Fox Memorial Shield (senior championship) ==
=== Fox Memorial standings ===
Team	Pld	W	D	L	F	A	Pts
Manukau	14	9	1	4	223	194	19
Richmond Rovers	14	8	2	4	199	136	18
Devonport United	14	6	4	4	184	150	16
Mount Albert United	13	7	1	5	152	149	15
Ponsonby United	13	7	0	6	191	186	14
Marist Old Boys	14	6	1	7	152	184	13
City Rovers	13	4	1	8	168	210	9
Newton Rangers	13	2	0	11	156	216	4

=== Fox Memorial results ===
==== Round 1 ====
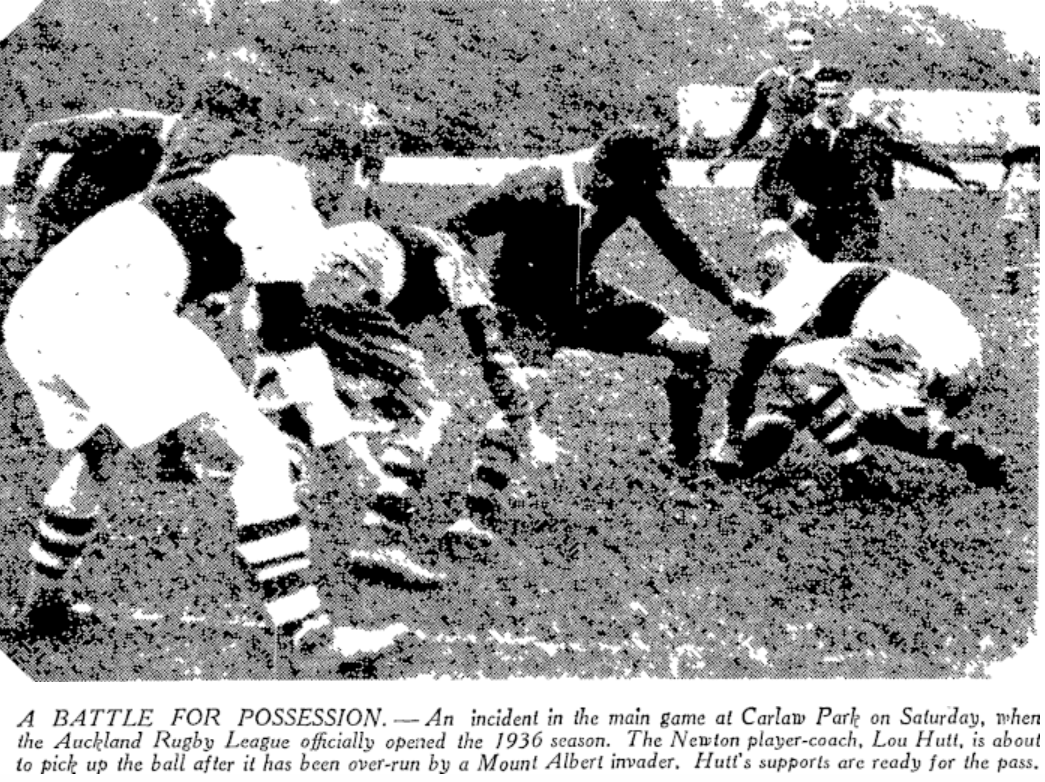
Lou Hutt (Newton) picking up the ball v Mt Albert.

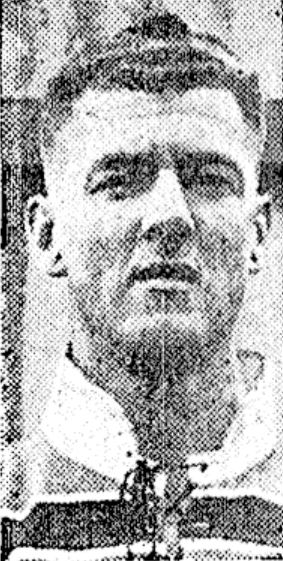
Edgar Morgan debuted for Ponsonby

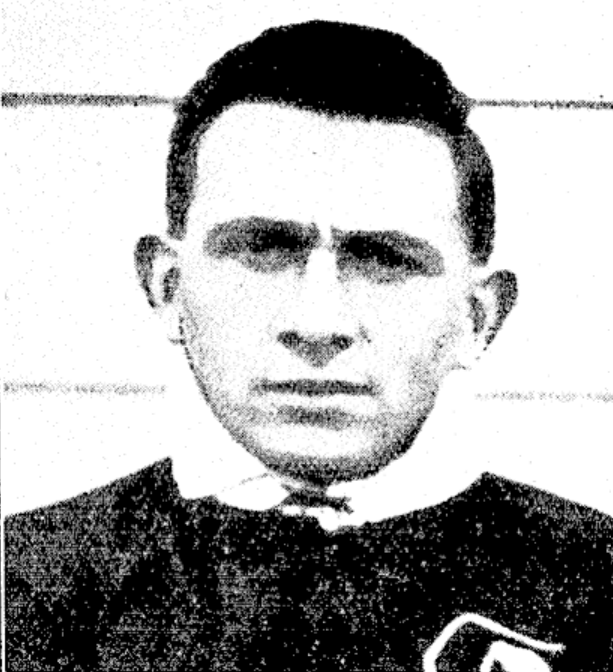
George Tittleton scored his first try for Richmond. He had moved to Auckland from the Taupiri club and had played for New Zealand in 1930 and again in 1935 and 1936.

The season was officially declared open by John A. Lee, the parliamentary under-secretary to the prime minister and the president of Auckland Rugby League. H Walmsley, the vice-president did the ceremonial kickoff in the main 3pm match between Mt Albert and Newton. The matches were played at Carlaw Park in rain with occasional hail. There was some controversy at the end of the match between Marist and City. Left winger, Sidney Loader scored a try for Marist with time up but the ball was still in play which won them the match. City protested the result believing too much time had been played but the time keeper gave a detailed description of why time had been added and City accepted the result. City had led 11–6 at halftime before the Marist forwards dominated the second half. Veteran fullback Norm Campbell was playing well for Marist before injuring an ankle and having to go off. He was replaced in that position by Daniel Keane, a forward who played well in an unaccustomed position. John Anderon debuted for Marist in the loose forwards after transferring from the West Coast where he had represented the West Coast side and the South Island in 1935. Manukau in their first game in the senior A grade since 1913 played well in the first half and only trailed 3–2 at half time before falling away and losing 27–2. Future New Zealand internationals Jack Hemi, Angus Gault, and Frank Pickrang all debuted for Manukau and were said to have been "splendid". With the retirement of Bert Cooke, Richmond recruited George Tittleton from the South Auckland area. He started at fullback but then was moved to his more natural position of wing for the second half and fared better. Ted Mincham who had been playing well at centre and teaming with Wally Tittleton (winger) was forced back to cover the custodian position. For Ponsonby, forward Edgar Morgan debuted. He played four seasons for them and made three appearances for Auckland. He had previously played for the Grammar Old Boys rugby club and played for Auckland in 1933 and 1934.

2 May	Mount Albert	6-5	Newton	Carlaw Park 1
3:00	Try: Des Herring, Ray Halsey		Try: Pat Young; Pen: Frederick Sissons	Referee: Maurice Wetherill

2 May	Richmond	21-10	Ponsonby	Carlaw Park 1
1:30	Try: Owen Wilkie 3, Noel Bickerton, George Tittleton; Con: Eric Fletcher, Cliff Satherley; Pen: Cliff Satherley		Try: Arthur Kay, Frank Halloran; Con: Frank Paton; Pen: Frank Paton	Referee: Wilfred Simpson

2 May	Marist	12-10	City	Carlaw Park 2
3:00	Try: Joe Woods, Bill Breed, Vincent Bakalich, Sidney Loader		Try: Herbert Thompson, Lou Brown, James Dye; Con: Cyril Wiberg	Referee: Percy Rogers

2 May	Devonport	27-2	Manukau	Carlaw Park 2
1:30	Try: Henry Crook 2, Arthur Sowter 2, Reg Hollows, G Rhodes, Len Scott; Con: Tony Milicich 2, George Kerr		Pen: Jack Hemi	Referee: Frank Thompson

==== Round 2 ====
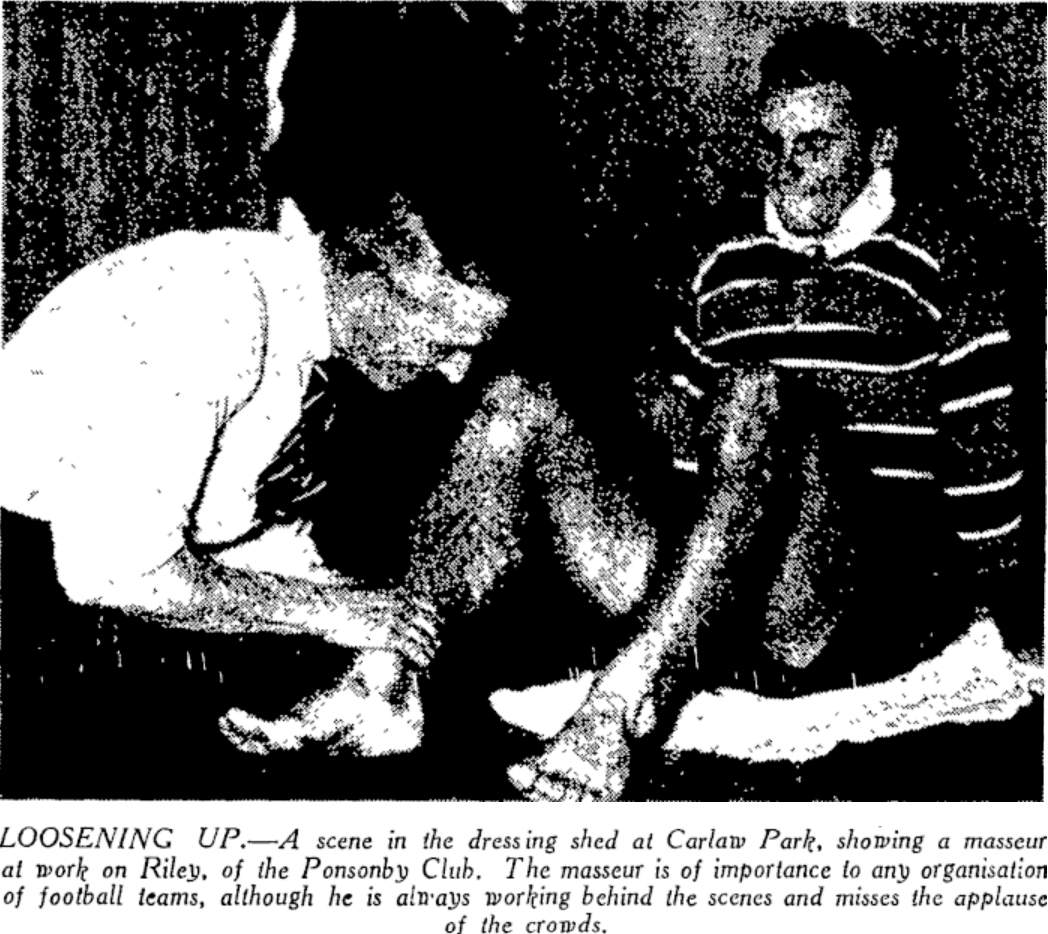
Brian Riley of Ponsonby before their match with City.

Following the Manukau win over Richmond, which was the first time the two teams had ever competed at a senior level, Mr. Albert Cowan, one of the founders of the Manukau senior side entered their dressing room to congratulate the team. Whilst there he suffered a fatal heart attack and was unable to be revived. It was the first time that Manukau had ever played against Richmond in a senior rugby league fixture. The 3pm kickoff games were underway and the flags were lowered to half mast. News of his death reached the nearby Domain where the reserve matches were taking place. Upon hearing of his death the Manukau reserve team game was stopped. Manukau had won the match with a fine defeat of last years champions Richmond. Thomas Trevathan debuted for Manukau in the five eighths after moving north from Dunedin where he had been a rugby union representative. He went on to play twice for New Zealand later in the year, while his brother David Trevathan became an All Black in 1937. They were related to William Trevarthan who played for the All Golds in 1907–08. During the game international Cliff Satherley was concussed and taken to Auckland Hospital. Alan Clarke made his first appearance for Marist since 1934 when he had retired. He played in the second row with Daniel Keane with Joe Woods unavailable and "showed he still maintains his form". Len Scott, the 29 year old winger for Devonport scored a telling try from halfway when he took a cross field kick and raced away to score. Scott had played for New Zealand in 1928 and 1932, and his form was good enough this season for him to be selected to play against the Australian side later in the year.

9 May	Marist	11-0	Newton	Carlaw Park 1
1:30	Try: John Anderson, Sidney Loader, Bill Breed; Con: Robert Aro			Referee: Percy Rogers

9 May	Manukau	14-8	Richmond	Carlaw Park 2
1:30	Try: Frank Pickrang, Joe Broughton; Con: Jack Hemi 2 Pen: Jack Hemi 2		Try: Maurice Metcalfe, Wally Tittleton; Pen: Maurice Metcalfe	Referee: Owen Chalmers

9 May	Devonport	10-5	Mount Albert	Carlaw Park 1
3:00	Try: Reg Hollows, Len Scott; Con: Tony Milicich; Pen: Tony Milicich		Try: Ray Halsey; Con: Robert Morrissey	Referee: Wilfred Simpson

9 May	Ponsonby	21-10	City	Carlaw Park 2
3:00	Try: R Jones, Cecil Blood, Frank Halloran, Bert Leatherbarrow, Thomas Holland; Con: Frank Paton 3		Try: T Allen, Lou Brown; Con: Jackie Rata; Pen: Cyril Wiberg	Referee: Maurice Wetherill

==== Round 3 ====
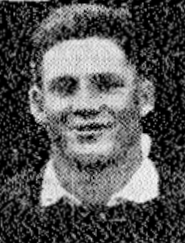
Len Scott (Devonport)

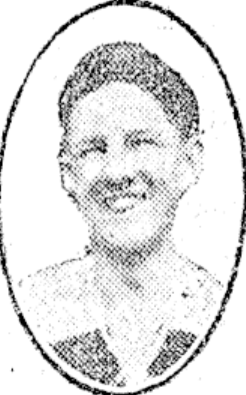
Eric Fletcher (Richmond)

New Zealand international Eric Fletcher had to leave the field for Richmond with a foot injury. It was to be his last ever appearance in rugby league as he moved back to Palmerston North and was reinstated to rugby union. He finished the season playing several matches for Manawatu before retiring and taking up representative golf. His younger brother Keith had joined the club recently and debuted for the senior side soon after. Richmond was still struggling to fill the full back position with the retirement of Cooke and Reece Marshall was tried there, and though he kicked well he was weak under pressure. With Fletcher leaving the field Wally Tittleton moved in to first five eighth from centre and played well. Harold Tetley came out of the scrum to play second five eighth. In the main match at Carlaw Park Devonport comfortably beat Marist. Marist were still without their captain, fullback Norm Campbell and his stand in Bill Glover went off injured early in the game. Alan Clarke tried filling in at the position but was a failure and then winger Arthur Furlonger moved there in the second half but "was well below the required standard". Len Scott who had scored a "sensational try the previous Saturday, was responsible for an even better try... intercepting in his own twenty-five, he ran round the opposition and then straightened to outpace all his opponents and score between the posts". Ponsonby proved too good for Manukau, particularly in the backs. The Manukau forwards were much stronger in the first half but they were criticised for playing too tightly. Jack Hemi's kicking was outstanding, taking many long range efforts. At one point he attempted a drop goal from ten yards inside his own half that only missed when it "swerved past the top of one post". His punting was also traveling up to 70 yards with Ponsonby full back Frank Paton having to turn and chase after the ball more than once.

16 May	Devonport	20-9	Marist	Carlaw Park 1
3:00	Try: Ted Scott, Tony Milicich, Trevor Jordan, Len Scott; Con: George Kerr 2, Tony Milicich 2		Try: Jim O'Kane, Vincent Bakalich 2	Referee: Percy Rogers

16 May	Mount Albert	13-12	Richmond	Carlaw Park 1
1:30	Try: Richard Shadbolt, Huck Flanagan, Ray Halsey; Con: Robert Morrissey 2		Try: Maurice Metcalfe, Noel Bickerton; Pen: Reece Marshall 3	Referee: Maurice Wetherill

16 May	Ponsonby	24-18	Manukau	Carlaw Park 2
3:00	Try: Thomas Holland 3, Edgar Morgan, Frank Halloran, John Stockley; Con: Frank Paton 3		Try: Mason, Frank Pickrang; Con: Jack Hemi; Pen: Jack Hemi 5	Referee: Stuart Billman

16 May	Newton	20-16	City	Carlaw Park 2
1:30	Try: Roy Bright 2, Ted Brimble, Lou Hutt; Con: Frederick Sissons 4		Try: Phil Donovan, William McLaughlin; Con: Cyril Wiberg; Pen: Cyril Wiberg 3 Drop: Cyril Wiberg	Referee: Wilfred Simpson

==== Round 4 ====
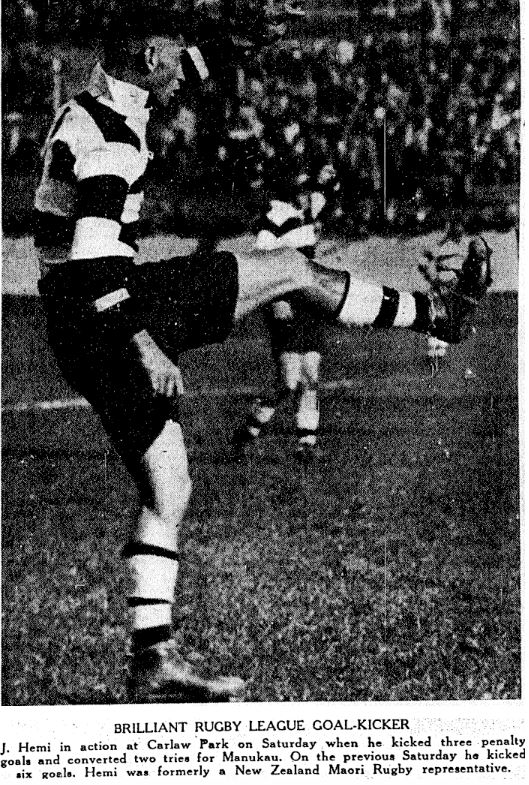
Jack Hemi goal kicking for Manukau v City.

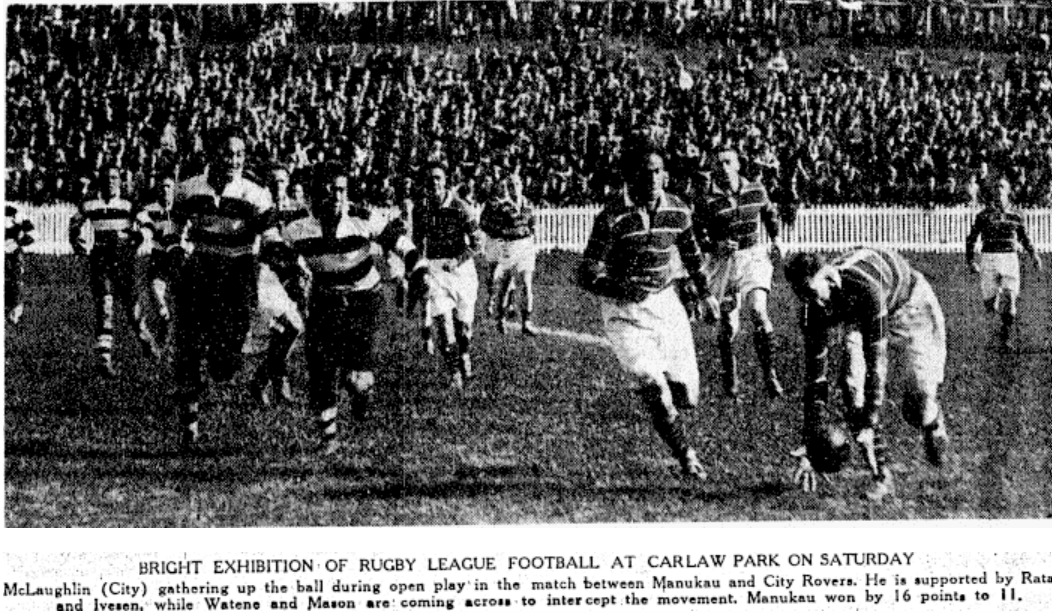
William McLaughlin, the City left winger picking up the ball.

City outscored Manukau three tries to two but the goal kicking of Jack Hemi was the difference. After kicking six goals the previous weekend he kicked five more for City in their 16–11 win. It was the first ever time that Manukau had beaten City in the senior grade. The two sides had only met three previous times in 1912 and 1913 with City winning two (5-3 and 7-4), and a 3-3 draw. Last years top try scorer, Newton winger Hugh Brady made his first appearance of the season for them and kicked two goals in their surprise 23–5 win over Devonport who had been unbeaten.

23 May	Ponsonby	22-20	Mount Albert	Carlaw Park 1
3:00	Try: Edgar Morgan 2, Brian Riley, Walter Stockley; Con: Frank Paton 2 Pen: Frank Paton 3		Try: Clarrie Peterson, Davis, Joseph Gunning, Ray Halsey; Con: Robert Morrissey 3 Pen: Robert Morrissey	Referee: Stuart Billman

23 May	Manukau	16-11	City	Carlaw Park 1
1:30	Try: Mason, George Whye; Con: Jack Hemi 2 Pen: Jack Hemi 3		Try: James Herring, Lou Brown, William McLaughlin; Con: Cyril Wiberg	Referee: Wilfred Simpson

23 May	Richmond	23-13	Marist	Carlaw Park 2
3:00	Try: Noel Bickerton 2, Owen Wilkie, Reece Marshall, Maurice Metcalfe; Con: Reece Marshall 2 Pen: Reece Marshall, George Tittleton		Try: John Anderson 2, Bill Breed; Con: John Anderson; Pen: John Anderson	Referee: Maurice Wetherill

23 May	Newton	23-5	Devonport	Carlaw Park 2
1:30	Try: Roy Bright 2, John Wall, Lou Hutt, Joseph Ginders; Con: Hugh Brady, Frederick Sissons 2 Pen: Hugh Brady		Try: Len Scott; Con: Tony Milicich	Referee: Roy Otto

==== Round 5 ====
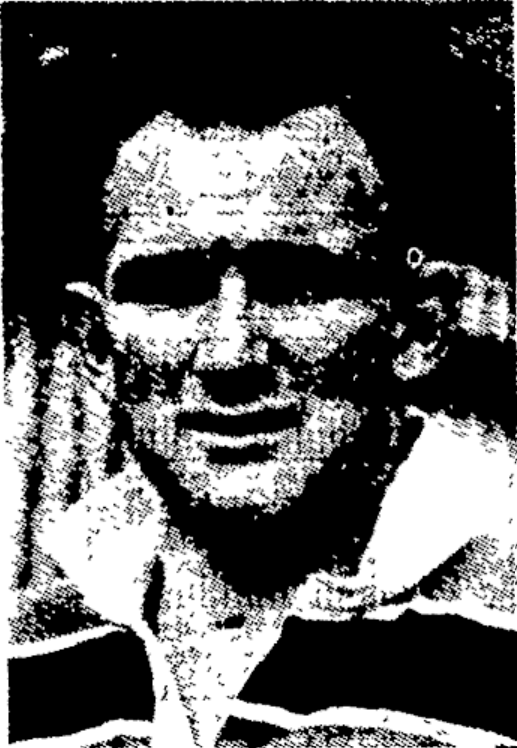
Clarrie Petersen (Mt Albert)

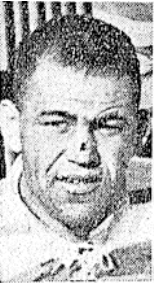
Frank Pickrang (Manukau)

Dick Smith (former NZ international, on debut for Newton)

Members of Parliament, John A. Lee (Grey Lynn), Bill Jordan (Manukau), and Jim Barclay (Marsden) "were interested spectators" at Carlaw Park and were entertained with afternoon tea by the league. Clarrie Petersen scored two tries for Mt Albert in their 23–18 win over Manukau. He started the match in the forwards but was moved out on to the wing (when Ray Halsey went off injured) and there he scored two "fine tries". He had transferred from Hawkes Bay where he played rugby union at the beginning of the season. He moved to Ponsonby in 1937 and then North Shore in 1940 representing Auckland four times from 1938 to 1941. Fellow forward Joseph Gunning scored a try and kicked four goals, while for Manukau Jack Hemi added another nine points to his season tally which now stood at 41. Rugby recruit, Len Kawe scored one of their other tries with the third going to Steve Watene. The outstanding forward on the ground was said to be Frank Pickrang the Manukau second rower who had joined the club from King Country rugby. Manukau had led 16–5 at halftime but fell away in the second half as Mt Albert asserted themselves. It was the first time the two teams had met in senior grade football. Devonport also overturned a 10–6 halftime deficit to win 29–10. Retired Allan Seagar who was coaching the side was a last minute replacement for centre Trevor Jordan and he struggled to get the ball out to his wingers Clifford Hall and Len Scott, though he did score a try. The veteran Devonport forwards, Arthur Sowter, Tony Milicich, Horace Hunt, and Ted Scott all played well with the outstanding player being recent rugby recruit Reg Hollows. For City, Carl Spiro played well on debut for them after transferring from Mt Albert. Newton centre, Roy Bright scored two magnificent tries after cutting through holes, one was a swerving 60 yard effort finished under the posts and drawing a "fine ovation from the spectators". All seven of the tries in Newton's loss to Richmond came in the second half after Newton led 4–2 at the break. For Richmond Noel Bickerton and Harold Tetley both scored twice. Their last try came after the full time bell was rung. Many of the Newton players had stopped playing despite the ball still being in play and winger Hugh Brady had left the field when the try was scored. Ultimately however it did not affect the result as Richmond already led by two points at the time. On the opposite wing from Brady was Dick Smith, the former New Zealand representative who was debuting for his new side after transferring from Devonport. In Marist's 16–11 win against Ponsonby their West Coast second rower John Anderson was outstanding, scoring two tries where he outpaced the Ponsonby fullback, Frank Paton.

30 May	Mount Albert	23-18	Manukau	Carlaw Park 1
1:30	Try: Des Herring, Joseph Gunning, Robert Morrissey, Clarrie Petersen 2 Con: Joseph Gunning 3 Pen: Joseph Gunning		Try: Jack Hemi, Len Kawe, Steve Watene 2 Con: Jack Hemi 2 Drop: Jack Hemi	Referee: Frank Thompson

30 May	Richmond	19-14	Newton	Carlaw Park 1
3:00	Try: Noel Bickerton 2, Harold Tetley 2, James Shepherd; Con: Ted Mincham, George Tittleton		Try: Roy Bright 2 Con: Hugh Brady, Frederick Sissons; Pen: Hugh Brady, Frederick Sissons	Referee: Maurice Wetherill

30 May	Devonport	29-15	City	Carlaw Park 2
1:30	Try: J.C. Cowan 2, Reg Hollows 2, C Rhodes, Allan Seagar, Arthur Sowter; Con: Tony Milicich 4		Try: Lou Brown, McCarthy, Jackie Rata; Con: Cyril Wiberg 2 Pen: Cyril Wiberg	Referee: T Evans

30 May	Marist	16-11	Ponsonby	Carlaw Park 2
3:00	Try: Vincent Bakalich 2, John Anderson 2 Con: John Anderson; Pen: John Anderson		Try: R Jones, Arthur Kay, Selwyn Davis; Con: Walter Stockley	Referee: Percy Rogers

==== Round 6 ====
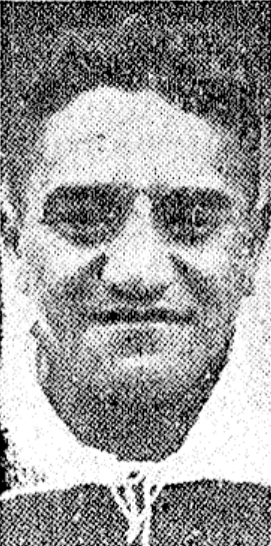
Peter Mahima debuted for Manukau at halfback. He went on to represent Auckland Māori six times and Auckland three times.

The City v Mount Albert match was played at Prince Edward Park in Papakura. Thomas Pawson left the field during the match with an ankle injury and then Harry Halliwell was knocked out by a late tackle in the first half and was unconscious for "three quarters of an hour". Jack Hemi injured his knee playing for Manukau and had to leave the field. The injury saw him miss several weeks. Of Manukau's heavy win over Marist the Auckland Star opened the description with "it was a field day for the tribes of Ngatimaru, Ngatihika and Maniapoto, and Hemi's men played with a joyous abandon to register a runaway victory against Marist". The match was the first time that the two teams had met in a senior fixture. Marist did not exist when Manukau last played in senior competions in the early 1910s.

6 June	Richmond	13-13	Devonport	Carlaw Park 1
3:00	Try: Alf Mitchell, Jack Satherley, Wally Tittleton; Con: George Tittleton, Ted Mincham		Try: Cliff Hall, Ted Scott, Len Scott; Con: Tony Milicich 2	Referee: Percy Rogers

6 June	Ponsonby	22-10	Newton	Carlaw Park 1
1:30	Try: Albert Payne 3, Walter Stockley, R.O. Jones, Frank Paton; Con: Frank Paton, Bert Leatherbarrow		Try: Ted Brimble, Roy Bright; Con: Frederick Sissons 2	Referee: Wilfred Simpson

6 June	Manukau	39-18	Marist	Carlaw Park 2
3:00	Try: Joe Murray 2, Joe Broughton 2, Thomas Trevarthan 2, Angus Gault 2, Steve Watene; Con: Jack Hemi 4 Pen: Jack Hemi 2		Try: W.E. Robinson, Bill Breed, John Anderson, Dan Keane; Con: John Anderson 2 Pen: John Anderson	Referee: Stuart Billman

6 June	City	21-18	Mount Albert	Prince Edward Park, Papakura
3:00	Try: Lou Brown 2, Jackie Rata 2, William McLaughlin; Con: Jackie Rata 2 Pen: Jackie Rata		Try: Claude List 2, L Bickerton, Joseph Gunning; Con: Robert Morrissey; Pen: Robert Morrissey 2	Referee: Maurice Wetherill

==== Round 7 ====
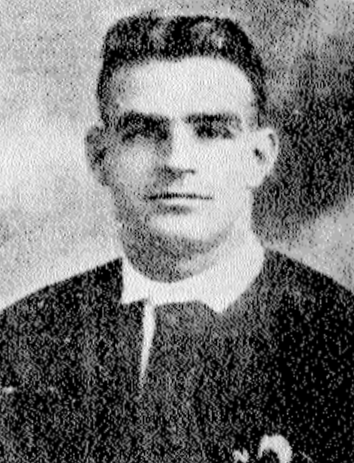
Lou Brown, City's outstanding winger.

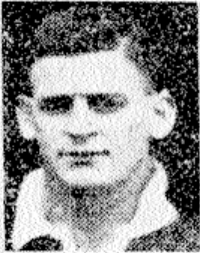
Allan Seagar, Devonport's coach who had come out of retirement.

In the main match Ponsonby trailed 13–0 to Devonport at halftime before scoring 17 second half points to win 17-15 following a penalty to Frank Paton in the last few minutes. The main reason was the combination of Walter Stockley and Brian Riley in the five eighths and Arthur Kay at centre three quarter. Though Riley was said to have developed a bad habit of taking passes one handed and sending them on the same way. Kay's try came when he "cut the defence to shreds". Devonport played loose forward Ted Scott at five eighths who did a good job of "harassing" Stockley. Alongside Scott was Allan Seagar their coach who had come out of retirement was well watched. Edgar Morgan was the outstanding forward for Ponsonby and was on the verge of representative honours. In City's 18–12 win over Richmond the outstanding back was once again Lou Brown, scoring three tries. In a description of the match the newspaper refereed back to a comment made the previous season when the Auckland team was described as "Lou Brown and twelve others". Having scored over two hundred tries playing professionally in England he still dominated back play in Auckland despite now being 31 years old. His third try saw him cross the field from his wing, chiming into the backline on the opposite side of the field creating an overlap from which he scored. Their other try was scored by William McLaughlin who was playing on the wing. He had spent time in the five eighths, loose forwards and now the wing and had gained a reputation as being a "handyman" capable of filling in almost anywhere to a high standard. George Kerr, the Devonport fullback played his best game of league to this point taking the ball at his feet while running at full speed on several occasions. On the number 2 field Newton missed the services of first five eighth Ted Brimble, while Manukau's first five eighth Thomas Trevathan was also unavailable. Brimble was the bigger loss to his backline which did not function as well as normal. Manukau even survived the loss early in the game to a knee injury to their star fullback Jack Hemi. Steve Watene moved into fullback, his position from years gone by and played very well and also kicked four goals including a last minute penalty to win the match. A Hollis played his best game to date in the five eighths while recent recruit Peter Mahima showed improvement at halfback. Davis was reinstated on the wing after recovering enough from a broken collar-bone. In the Newton backs Roy Bright scored a fine try, while Claude Dempsey was strong at fullback as usual and Frederick Sissons and Dick Smith played well. For Manukau it was their first ever senior grade victory over Newton after suffering 3 losses to them in their only previous matches in 1912 and 1913.

13 June	Ponsonby	17-15	Devonport	Carlaw Park 1
3:15	Try: Jones, Arthur Kay, Edgar Morgan; Con: Frank Paton 2 Pen: Frank Paton 2		Try: J.C. Cowan, Len Scott, Arthur Sowter; Con: Tony Milicich; Pen: Tony Milicich 2	Referee: Wilfred Simpson

13 June	Mount Albert	10-7	Marist	Carlaw Park 1
1:30	Try: Richard Shadbolt, Des Herring; Con: Robert Morrissey; Pen: Robert Morrissey		Try: W.E. Robinson; Pen: Robert Aro 2	Referee: Maurice Wetherill

13 June	Manukau	15-14	Newton	Carlaw Park 2
3:00	Try: Frank Pickrang, Mason, J Rutherford; Con: Steve Watene 2 Pen: Steve Watene		Try: Frederick Sissons, Roy Bright; Con: Frederick Sissons; Pen: Frederick Sissons, Hugh Brady 2	Referee: Percy Rogers

13 June	City	18-12	Richmond	Carlaw Park 2
3:00	Try: Lou Brown 3, William McLaughlin; Con: Jackie Rata; Pen: Cyril Wiberg 2		Try: Broadhead, Bill Telford; Con: Reece Marshall; Pen: Reece Marshall 2	Referee: Frank Thompson

==== Round 8 ====
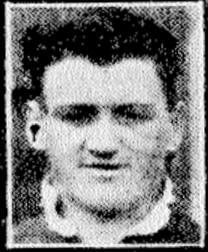
Former well known New Zealand international Craddock Dufty debuted for City after retiring in 1931.

After a remarkable four and a half year absence, former Kiwi Craddock Dufty turned out for City at the age of 36 at fullback in their 16–5 loss to Marist. His appearance caused considerable interest and he weighed 14st 12lb and looked "remarkably fit". He scored 47 points over the remainder of the season which meant he was the 6th highest point scorer for the season. During the Manukau and Devonport match George Kerr had to leave the field with 15 minutes remaining with a leg injury and Steve Watene came up from fullback to join an attack and scored the equalising try with minutes to go. For Ponsonby A. Payne was carried from the field near full time with a side injury. In Newton's 11–8 loss to Mt Albert they were without centre Roy Bright, and five eighth Ted Brimble. At one point during the game on the number two field, their winger Pat Young was tackled close to the sideline and smashed into the picket fence with "terrific impact". He was said to have been "badly shaken" but fortunately was not badly injured and that this was an ongoing issue with the fence only about 9 feet from the sideline.

20 June	Manukau	5-5	Devonport	Carlaw Park 1
3:15	Try: Steve Watene; Pen: Thomas Trevathan		Try: Henry Crook; Pen: George Kerr	Referee: Percy Rogers

20 June	Richmond	15-6	Ponsonby	Carlaw Park 1
1:30	Try: Roy Powell, Harold Tetley, Alf Broadhead; Con: Ted Mincham 2 Pen: Ted Mincham		Try: Walter Stockley, A Payne	Referee: Maurice Wetherill

20 June	Mount Albert	11-8	Newton	Carlaw Park 2
3:00	Try: Robert Morrissey, Thomas Pawson, Des Herring; Con: Des Herring		Try: Hugh Brady, Wilfred Brimble; Pen: Frederick Sissons	Referee: Wilfred Simpson

20 June	Marist	16-5	City	Carlaw Park 2
1:30	Try: Sidney Loader 2, John Anderson, Bill Breed; Con: John Anderson 2		Try: Carl Spiro; Pen: Craddock Dufty	Referee: Ralph Otto

==== Round 9 ====
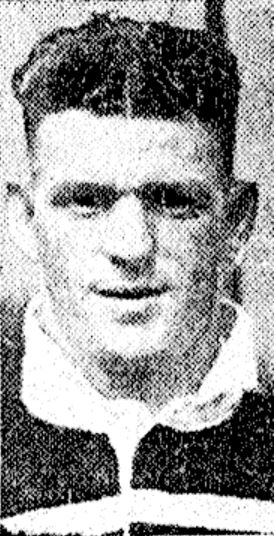
Angus Gault (Manukau)

Dick Smith (Newton)

Angus Gault was concussed whilst playing for Manukau against Richmond and was taken to hospital. In the same match Richmond winger, Owen Wilkie scored three tries. For Manukau Steve Watene scored all of their points with a try and four goals. In Mt Albert's 9–7 win against Devonport, Gordon Campbell made his season debut in his accustomed position of hooker. Devonport were without their full back George Kerr who had been in excellent form and he was replaced by Herbert Thompson who ran strongly but did not kick well. Rhodes also made a reappearance for Devonport at five eighths with loose forward Horace Hunt joining him at second five eighth. Hunt had been the Auckland cricket wicketkeeper in the 1929–30, 30–31 seasons. City trailed Ponsonby 16–8 at halftime but held Ponsonby scoreless in the second half. With a few minutes to go they were behind by one point when Lou Brown made a run down the wing and kicked ahead to the goal line where his half back Arnold Porteous won the race to score the winning try. Both Jackie Rata (centre three quarter), and Jack Tawhai (second five eighth) played "splendidly" for City with Rata responsible for two of their tries. In their forwards, Bay of Plenty rugby union player Tai Raymond debuted and was impressive. For Ponsonby, their captain and first five eighth Walter Stockley "played his best game this season". Dick Smith scored his first points for Newton after transferring from Devonport. It was to be his only season with Newton before rejoining his old Devonport club in 1938.

27 June	Richmond	27-11	Manukau	Carlaw Park 1
3:00	Try: Owen Wilkie 3, Wally Tittleton, Bill Telford, George Tittleton, Jack Satherley; Con: George Tittleton, Ted Mincham 2		Try: Steve Watene; Con: Steve Watene; Pen: Steve Watene 3	Referee: Maurice Wetherill

27 June	Mount Albert	9-7	Devonport	Carlaw Park 1
1:30	Try: Des Herring, Peterson, Ray Halsey		Try: John Donald; Pen: Tony Milicich 2	Referee: Frank Thompson

27 June	City	18-16	Ponsonby	Carlaw Park 2
3:00	Try: Jack Tawhai, W Johnson, Lou Brown, Arnold Porteous; Con: Craddock Dufty 2 Pen: Craddock Dufty		Try: Albert Payne 2, Jones, Walter Stockley; Con: Frank Paton 2	Referee: Wilfred Simpson

27 June	Marist	14-12	Newton	Carlaw Park 2
1:30	Try: John Anderson, Bill Breed; Con: John Anderson; Pen: John Anderson 3		Try: Roy Bright, Dick Smith; Con: Roy Bright 2 Pen: Frederick Sissons	Referee: Percy Rogers

==== Round 10 ====
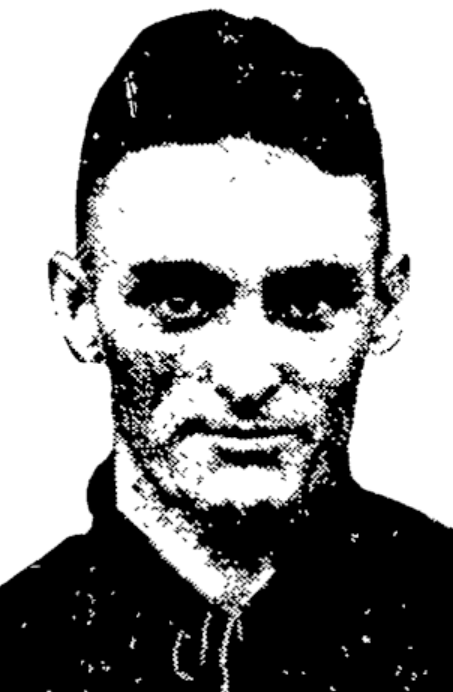
Ted Mincham (Richmond centre)

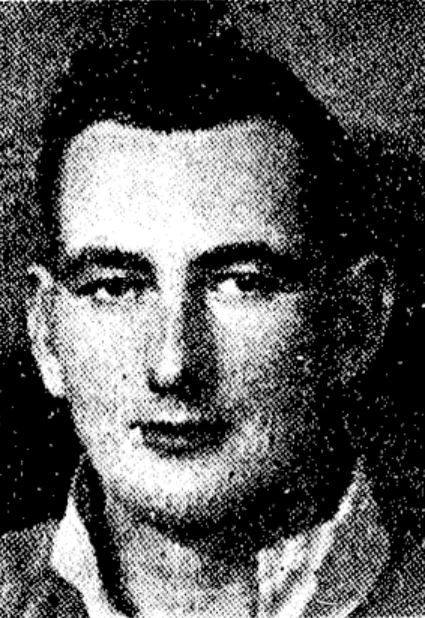
John Anderson, Marist's goal kicking loose forward who had represented the West Coast and South Island in 1935.

Fred Moate debuted for Manukau. It was his first game of rugby league as he had switched codes, previously represented East Coast in rugby union and was a five-eighth out of the Waima Rugby Club. In the final minute of the game he beat 4 defenders to score with Watene's conversion giving Manukau the win. It was their first defeat of Ponsonby in their 5th ever senior grade match In the Ponsonby side centre three quarter Brian Riley who had been out of form, switched places with Arthur Kay at second five eighth and played much better while Kay was said to be about the most impressive back on the field. The outstanding forward in the game was Angus Gualt who had recovered from the concussion he suffered the previous week. Craddock Dufty had the unique feat of scoring a try, kicking 3 conversions, a penalty, and a drop goal. All four ways of securing points. He was forced to leave the field midway through the second half after temporarily dislocating his shoulder. It was a high scoring match with Lou Brown scoring two of City's six tries which were all scored by backs while for Newton their star centre, Roy Bright scored three tries while captain Lou Hutt scored twice and Pat Young once. The difference being Dufty's kicking with Newton only gaining four points from goals, both by halfback Wilfred Brimble. Richmond led Mt Albert 9–3 at halftime with Ted Mincham outplaying Robert Morrissey, the respective centre three-quarters. After the break Mt Albert moved Morrissey back to full back in a swap with John Schultz. Len Schultz had returned to the side and played well marking the in from Wally Tittleton at second five eighth. Another change was needed when first five eighth Thomas Pawson went off injured and Harry Halliwell moved in from the wing. Richmond missed the services of the outstanding loose forward Harold Tetley. In the second draw of the round Marist and Devonport scored 8 points each. The normally reliable loose forward goal kicker John Anderson missed four shots from "handy range" while the one he did score from was the most difficult. Their tries came from back Reginald Haslam and forward Bill Breed, while for Devonport the in form winger, 29 year old Len Scott scored one and 33 year old captain/coach Allan Seagar the other. Kenneth Finlayson debuted for Marist in the forwards. He was the son of Charles Finlayson who was the first person to play rugby league for New Zealand and cricket for New Zealand though as the New Zealand cricket side was not recognised as a test playing nation his game against Australia did not count as an official international match. The first player to officially achieve the feat was Verdun Scott who became a New Zealand rugby league representative in 1939 and a New Zealand cricket representative in 1946. Scott debuted for North Shore later in the season.

4 July	Richmond	11-11	Mount Albert	Carlaw Park 1
3:00	Try: George Tittleton; Pen: Ted Mincham 4		Try: Harry Halliwell, Huck Flanagan, Charles Dunne; Con: Robert Morrissey	Referee: Wilfred Simpson

4 July	Manukau	14-12	Ponsonby	Carlaw Park 1
1:40	Try: Joe Broughton, Fred Moate; Con: Steve Watene 2 Pen: Steve Watene 2		Try: Brian Riley, Arthur Kay; Con: R Jones; Pen: R Jones 2	Referee: Percy Rogers

4 July	City	28-22	Newton	Carlaw Park 2
1:40	Try: Lou Brown 2, Jack Tawhai, William McLaughlin, Jackie Rata, Craddock Dufty; Con: Craddock Dufty 3 Pen: Craddock Dufty; Drop: Craddock Dufty		Try: Roy Bright 3, Lou Hutt 2, Pat Young; Con: Wilfred Brimble 2	Referee: Stuart Billman

4 July	Marist	8-8	Devonport	Carlaw Park 2
3:00	Try: Bill Breed, Reginald Haslam; Con: John Anderson		Try: Len Scott, Allan Seagar; Con: John Donald	Referee: Maurice Wetherill

==== Round 11 ====
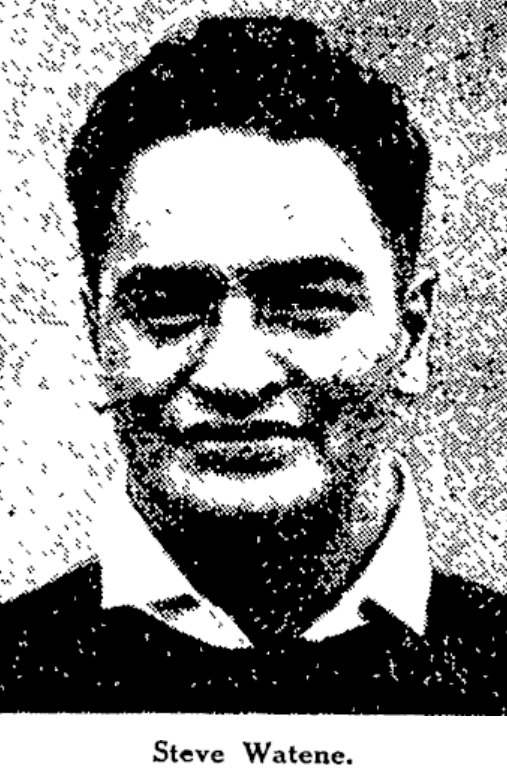
Puti Tipene (Steve) Watene, kicked two goals for Manukau in their win and was selected for Auckland and New Zealand to play England.

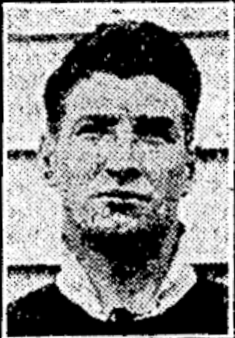
Cliff Satherley (Richmond)

Following the Devonport v Newton match Alex Nathan of the Newton side was involved in an "incident" in the dressing room area at Carlaw Park and after a two-hour discussion taken in committee he was suspended until December 31, 1937. He had been sent off along with a Devonport player (who was never named in the media) and who was "exonerated" though both players were "warned for indulging in rough tactics on the playing field". Over the coming months the Newton club appealed the suspension to both the Auckland Rugby League and the New Zealand Council but the suspension was upheld. Specific details of the incident were also never published. Nathan had been named as a likely addition to the Northland team to play England in order to strengthen the side along with George Kerr and Reg Hollows prior to his suspension. All three had been ex-Northlanders. Nathan had previously represented Auckland in 1933 and played several times for Auckland Māori including once earlier in 1936. Later in the year new evidence was presented to the Auckland Rugby League and other senior clubs supported the removal of the suspension but after a new hearing the suspension remained. Then on June 30, 1937, the Newton club again made "strong representations" and the suspension was uplifted and he was able to resume his career with Newton. Northland player T. Toki debuted for Manukau and the Northland association protested claiming that it was a clear case of "poaching". The protest was heard by the New Zealand Rugby League but referred back to Auckland Rugby League. Conditions were atrocious for all of the games but by the time of the 3pm kickoffs the fields were covered in mud and water. In the Ponsonby v Mount Albert match the referee stopped the game to admit that he could not tell the teams apart so requested that they stay onside. Players were even running off the field to wash their eyes in buckets of water. The Auckland Star joked that "men who looked like Petersen, Herring, and Flanagan were always in the thick of the mud for Mount Albert". Cliff Satherley made a reappearance in the Richmond loose forwards after being injured earlier in the year. After the games were completed the following team was named by sole selector, Bert Avery to play for Auckland against the touring England side: Claude Dempsey, Lou Brown, Wally Tittleton, Roy Bright, Walter Stockley, Arthur Kay, Roy Powell, Angus Gault, Jack Satherley, Bill Breed, Steve Watene, Frank Pickrang, and Harold Tetley.

18 July	Mount Albert	10-4	Ponsonby	Carlaw Park 1
3:00	Try: Charles Dunne, Clarrie Peterson; Pen: Harry Halliwell, Des Herring		Pen: R Jones 2	Referee: Percy Rogers

18 July	Manukau	10-6	City	Carlaw Park 1
1:40	Try: Joe Broughton, Mason; Con: Steve Watene 2		Try: Jackie Rata, Lou Brown	Referee: Maurice Wetherill

18 July	Richmond	3-0	Marist	Carlaw Park 2
3:00	Try: Owen Wilkie			Referee: Frank Thompson

18 July	Devonport	21-16	Newton	Carlaw Park 2
1:40	Try: Cliff Hall 2, Len Scott, Arthur Sowter, Reg Hollows; Con: George Kerr, Tony Milicich 2		Try: Joseph Ginders, John Wall, Roy Bright, Cyril Clemm; Con: Frederick Sissons 2	Referee: Wilfred Simpson

==== Round 12 ====
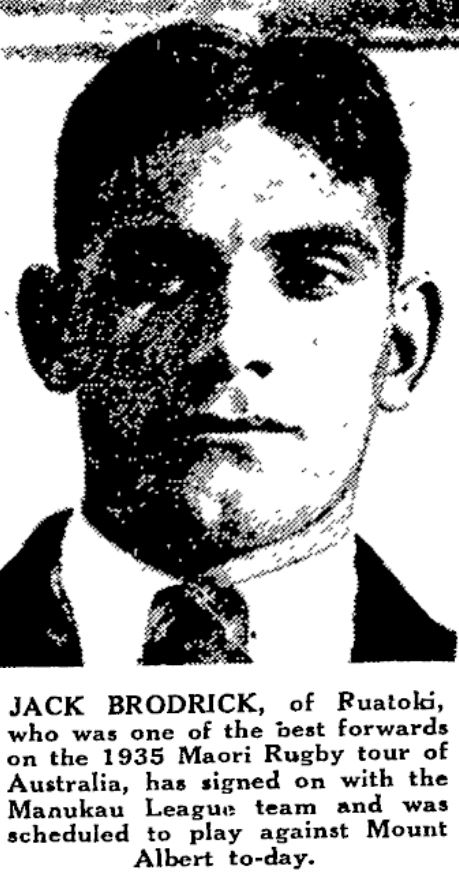

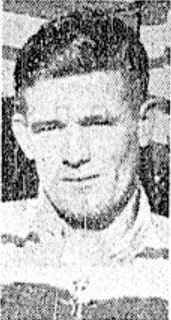
Frank Halloran (Ponsonby)

Jack Hemi returned to play for Manukau after a 4-week absence due to injury and helped them to an 11–6 win over Mt Albert. Their lone try to Frank Pickrang came after he charged down a clearing kick and scored. His form was such that he was picked in the New Zealand team to play England, as was their five eighth Thomas Trevathan who had been playing brilliantly since moving north from North Otago where he had been playing rugby. It was reported that following the Auckland v Great Britain match at Carlaw Park the week previous that the Manukau side had met to discuss what they had seen and learned from the match. The Auckland Star wrote that playing for the side had been a sought after venture for many Māori players and the latest to apply was Jack Brodrick, the New Zealand Māori rugby player. He debuted for Manukau in their game with Mt Albert and would go on to play for Auckland, Auckland Māori, North Island, New Zealand Māori, and New Zealand over the following two seasons. He was played on the wing so that he could pick up some of the basics of the game but would soon move into the second row where he became one of the outstanding players in that position in New Zealand. Mt Albert hooker Huck Flanagan injured himself at work and so his place was taken by veteran hooker Gordon Campbell and in the second half he gave his side "a feast of ball" from the scrums. Len Scott scored what had almost become a customary try in Devonport's 8–8 draw with City. He intercepted a "foolish" pass from City's five eighth, O. Hughes to Cyril Wiberg and was rewarded for his form this season with selection in the first test side to play England. Frank Halloran, Ponsonby's halfback played an outstanding game for them in a 9–8 win over Marist. Marist should have won the game but they missed an easy conversion of Robert Aro's try and then near the end John Anderson crossed the try line but in trying to improve his position was pushed over the dead ball line and missed a try. Maurice Wetherill was refereeing his 50th first grade match since his debut in 1933 after retiring from playing. He became the 6th referee to achieve the feat.

1 August	Manukau	11-6	Mount Albert	Carlaw Park 1
3:00	Try: Frank Pickrang; Con: Jack Hemi; Pen: Jack Hemi 3		Try: Ray Halsey, Joseph Gunning	Referee: Wilfred Simpson

1 August	City	8-8	Devonport	Carlaw Park 1
1:40	Try: Lou Brown, Jack Tawhai; Pen: Craddock Dufty		Try: Arthur Sowter, Len Scott; Con: Allan Seagar	Referee: Stuart Billman

1 August	Ponsonby	9-8	Marist	Carlaw Park 2
3:00	Try: Blackman, John Stockley, A Carter		Try: Gordon Matson, Robert Aro; Con: John Anderson	Referee: Frank Thompson

1 August	Richmond	22-6	Newton	Carlaw Park 2
1:40	Try: Alf Broadhead 3, Ted Mincham 2, George Tittleton; Con: Ted Mincham, Cliff Satherley		Try: Dick Smith, Pat Young	Referee: Maurice Wetherill

==== Round 13 ====
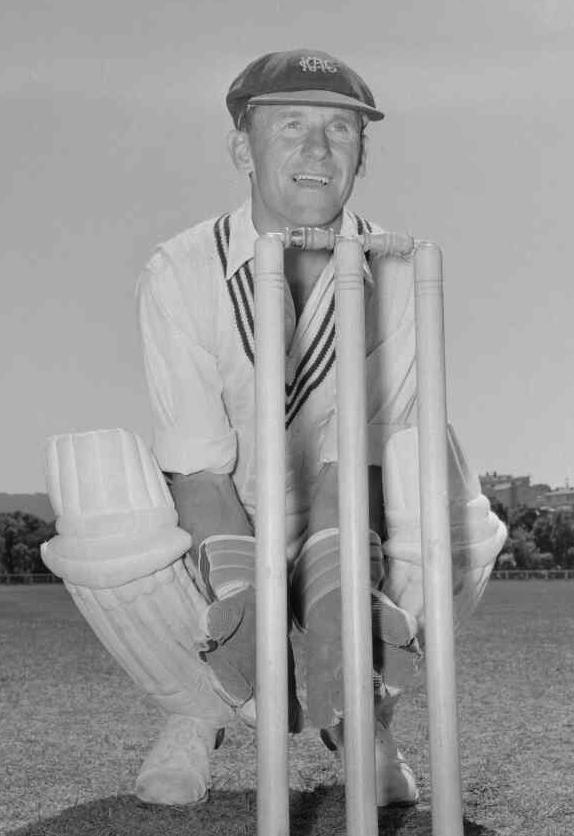
Verdun Scott debuted on the wing for Devonport.

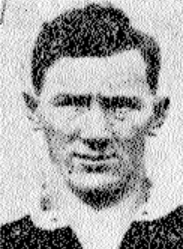
Paulo Serra, debuted for Marist after having played for the South Island in 1935.

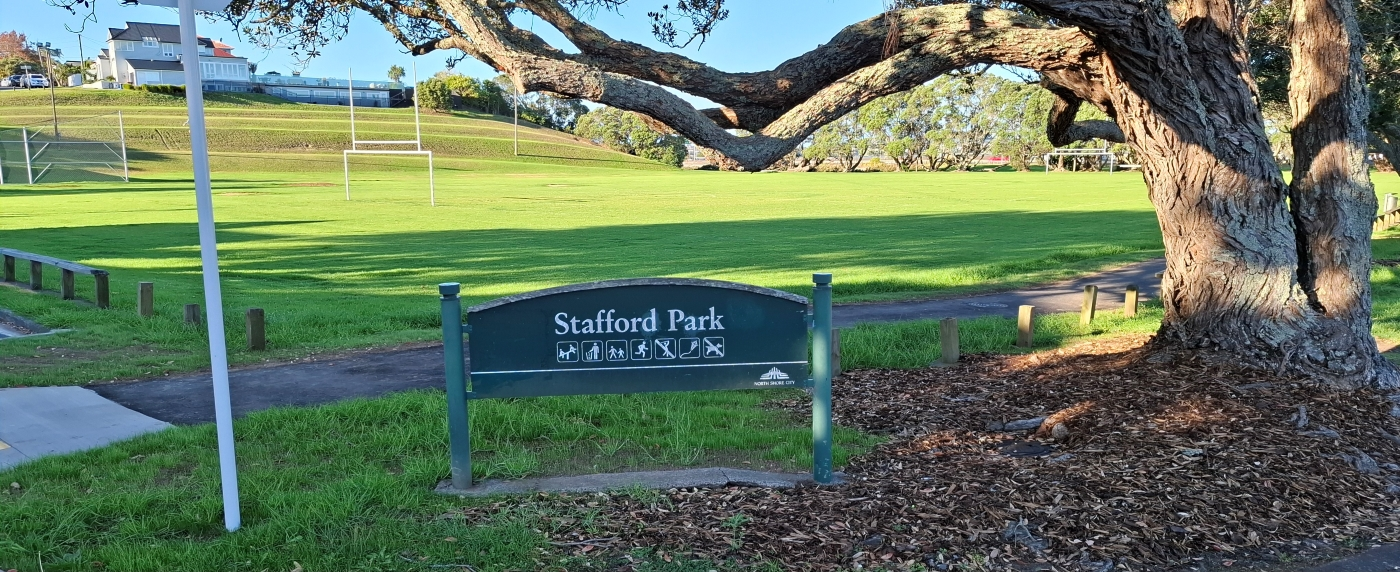
Stafford Park, Northcote where a postponed match was to have been played.

The City v Mount Albert and Ponsonby v Newton matches were both postponed due to the weather. The Ponsonby-Newton match was to be played at Stafford Park in Northcote. The number 2 field at Carlaw Park was covered in sheets of water so the reserve grade match due to be played there and the City-Mount Albert game were not able to be played. The weather was so bad that the 2 lone spectators sitting in the uncovered terraces were invited across the field to join those under cover in the railway stand. Ponsonby threw the ball around in the west conditions and easily beat Marist who were missing several regular players and had to get the services of some juniors before kickoff in order to field a team. One of their omissions was Reginald Haslam who had recently played as a guest in the Northland side which played England. While full back Bill Glover was also unavailable and he too had played the touring England side weeks earlier as a guest player for Taranaki where he gave an "almost flawless display". Jack Hemi played in the five eighths for the first time for Manukau and "time and again cut through brilliantly" while forward Angus Gault played well filling in on the wing scoring a try. For Marist the South Island forward Paulo Serra debuted and scored a try. In Devonport's 5–3 win over Richmond, Len Scott's brother, "a likely tall young winger" aged 20 named Verdun Scott debuted. He was selected for the New Zealand team to tour England in 1939 and then in 1946 played for the New Zealand test cricket side. The New Zealand Herald wrote that he "was prominent on the wing in the first half, and should do better under more favourable conditions".

22 August	Devonport	5-3	Richmond	Carlaw Park 1
3:00	Try: Reg Hollows; Pen: Tony Milicich		Try: George Tittleton	Referee: Frank Thompson

22 August	Manukau	24-7	Marist	Carlaw Park 1
1:40	Try: Peter Mahima 2, Jack Hemi, Angus Gault, Joe Broughton, Mason; Con: Puti Tipene Watene 3		Try: Paulo Serra; Con: John Anderson; Pen: John Anderson	Referee: Wilfred Simpson

22 August	City	Postponed	Mount Albert	Carlaw Park 2
3:00				Referee: Percy Rogers

22 August	Ponsonby	Postponed	Newton	Stafford Park, Northcote
3:00				Referee: T Evans

==== Round 14 ====
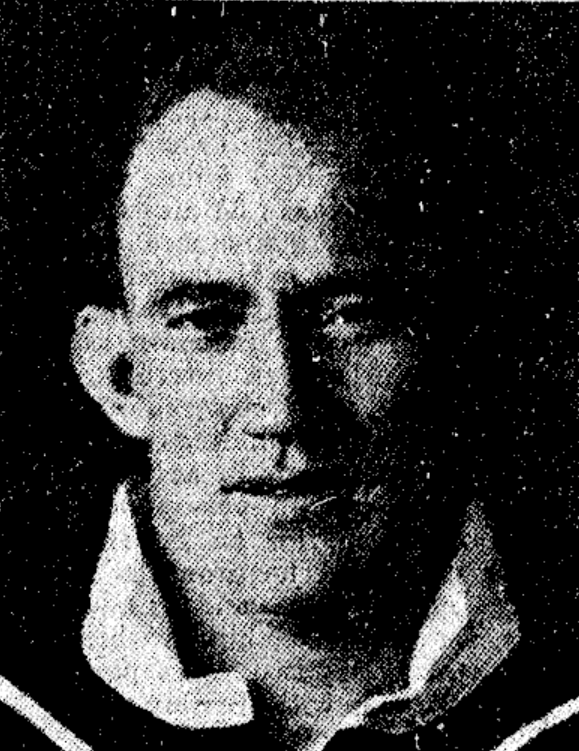
Des Herring (Mt Albert)

It was decided that the 2 postponed matches from round 13 would only be played if necessary. Going into the final round of matches the points table saw the following points for each team: Manukau 17, Richmond 16, Devonport 16, Mount Albert 15, Ponsonby 12, Marist 11, City 9, and Newton 4. Mount Albert, Ponsonby, City and Newton all had played one less game but after the final round of matches Manukau progressed to 19 competition points with their easy 26–6 win over Newton. Richmond trailed them by 1 point but had completed all of their matches while Devonport were 2 points further back so had no chance of overhauling Manukau. If Mount Albert had defeated Marist they would have moved to 17 points and a win over City would have necessitated a playoff with Manukau for the title, however they were upset 13–10 by rivals Marist, therefore the 2 postponed matches were not necessary. And thus the Fox Memorial for 1936 had been decided with Manukau winning their first ever title in their first season back in the senior competition since 1913. The side had been ably captained by Steve Watene who was the only player to transfer from another Auckland senior side. The final round also saw the debut of Andy Beyer for Richmond. He had previously represented Otahuhu and Auckland at rugby union. He played at fullback which meant Jack Greenwood moved to the wing and George Tittleton played in the unusual position of second row with Alf Broadhead. City were unlucky to lose 10 points to 2 to Richmond and led 2–0 at halftime before losing Jackie Rata to injury after he had been displaying "billiant form". The result meant that Richmond finished runners up after failing to defence the title they won in 1934 and 1935. Mt Albert had a bad day with Bert Schultz unable to play and forward Clarrie Petersen playing in his place on the wing. Then the other Schultz brothers, John and (captain) Len went off injured in the first spell with one replaced by Lance Evans who was on debut after moving from Christchurch. Mt Albert's Des Herring who was playing on the back of the scrum scored all their points with two tries both of which he converted and he "emerged with honours thick upon him". For Marist Reginald Haslam was their outstanding back in their 13–10 win. In Ponsonby's win their backs stood out with Brian Riley scoring three tries on the wing, and Arthur Kay scoring one at centre and Walter Stockely another at five eighth. For Devonport their fullback, George Kerr "played a great game" and was said to be the best fullback in Auckland currently.

29 August	Marist	13-10	Mount Albert	Carlaw Park 1
3:00	Try: Robert Aro, Sidney Loader, Francis List; Con: John Anderson; Pen: John Anderson		Try: Des Herring 2 Con: Des Herring 2	Referee: Wilfred Simpson

29 August	Richmond	10-2	City	Carlaw Park 1
1:40	Try: Leo Davis 2 Con: Andy Beyer 2		Con: Craddock Dufty	Referee: Percy Rogers

29 August	Manukau	26-6	Newton	Carlaw Park 2
3:00	Try: Angus Gault 2, Frank Pickrang, Peter Mahima, W Mason, George Whye; Con: Jack Hemi 3 Pen: Steve Watene		Try: Joseph Ginders, Roy Bright	Referee: Ralph Otto

29 August	Ponsonby	17-11	Devonport	Carlaw Park 2
1:40	Try: Brian Riley 3, Walter Stockley, Arthur Kay; Con: R Jones		Try: Reg Hollows 2, J.C Cowan; Drop: George Kerr	Referee: Stuart Billman

=== Roope Rooster (knockout competition) ===
It was decided to admit the Senior B champion side Papakura once again. This meant that nine teams were in the competition and Papakura drew the bye in the first round.

==== Round 1 ====
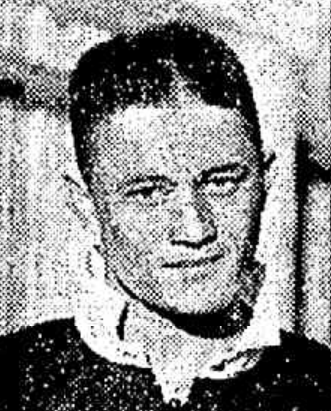
Walter Brimble who debuted for Manukau at second five eighth.

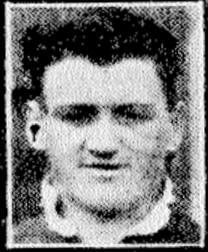
Craddock Dufty kicked the winning goal for City in extra time.

The Minister of Public Works, Bob Semple was a spectator at the games. The Manukau v Ponsonby game saw the teams evenly matched and it was only goal kicking which separated the sides. Walter Brimble debuted for Manukau after switching from the Manukau rugby club. He was the brother of Ted and Wilfred Brimble the Newton five eighth and halfback respectively. Ted had played for New Zealand in 1932 and Walter and Wilfred would go on to do the same in 1938. The City v Newton match went to extra time as the score was locked at 15–15 at full time. Two five minute spells were played and the deadlock was broken when Craddock Dufty kicked a penalty goal from the side line. In Richmond's 24–10 win over Marist, Owen Wilkie scored three tries on the wing, thanks to centre Ted Mincham who played his best game of the season. Wally Tittleton played well at second five eighth until he had to leave the field injured and lock, Harold Tetley came out of the scrum and filled his position ably. Marist fielded Andrew Fletcher of the Grammar Old Boys rugby club and Clive Murdoch of the Technical Old Boys club who joined former rugby players Reginald Haslam and Robert Aro in the backs. Fletcher played well at centre before being injured just before halftime. His replacement was Francis List (brother of Claude who went into the forwards with Vincent Bakalich moving from the forwards to the backs, and Jimmy Chalmers who had been on the wing going into the five eighths. Verdun Scott made his second appearance for Devonport and scored his first points, kicking 3 goals. Interestingly he was playing with his relatives Len Scott and Ted Scott, while in the opposition were the three Schultz brothers, Bert, John, and Len.

5 September	Manukau	10-8	Ponsonby	Carlaw Park 1
3:00	Try: Angus Gault, Peter Mahima; Con: Steve Watene; Pen: Steve Watene		Try: Arthur Kay, N McKinney; Pen: R Jones	Referee: Percy Rogers

5 September	Richmond	24-10	Marist	Carlaw Park 1
1:30	Try: Owen Wilkie 3, Bill Telford, George Tittleton, Harold Tetley; Con: Andy Beyer 3		Try: Sidney Loader 2 Con: John Anderson 2	Referee: Maurice Wetherill

5 September	Devonport	20-6	Mount Albert	Carlaw Park 2
3:00	Try: Len Scott 2, Henry Crook, Allan Seagar; Con: Verdun Scott 3 Pen: Verdun Scott		Try: Clarrie Peterson, Bert Schultz	Referee: Roy Otto

5 September	City	15-15 (aet:17-15)	Newton	Carlaw Park 2
1:30	Try: Stan Clark, Lou Brown, Cyril Wiberg; Con: Craddock Dufty 2 Pen: Craddock Dufty 2		Try: Dick Smith, Lou Hutt, Pat Young; Con: Ted Brimble; Pen: Ted Brimble 2	Referee: Frank Thompson

==== Semi-finals ====
With five teams remaining Devonport drew the bye. The Papakura v Manukau match was played at Prince Edward Park, Papakura's home ground. With 15 minutes to go Papakura led 8–0 before Manukau came home with four quick tries to win. Papakura missed five penalty shots at goal which could have made the task much more difficult. Papakura was handicapped by the fact that they hadn't played for seven weeks due to international matches and teams defaulting to them. Steve Watene, the Manukau captain said after the match that they had "cause to thank [their] fitness for saving defeat" and that his team had been completely surprised by the form Papakura had shown. The Papakura side featured three sets of brothers, three Burgess brothers, two Francis brothers, and two Taylor brothers. Richard Burgess scored a try after he intercepted on the Manukau 25 and dummied his way through to score. City fielded Cyril Wiberg at full back and brought Craddock Dufty up to five eighth. Whilst being said to have been slow moving his kicking was as good as ever pushing Richmond back. Jackie Rata and Jack Tawhai in the centre positions teamed "fantastically" while Lou Brown and William McLaughlin were "dangerous wingers".

12 September	City	10-8	Richmond	Carlaw Park 1
3:00	Try: Arnold Porteous, Tai Raymond; Con: Craddock Dufty; Pen: Craddock Dufty		Try: Alf Broadhead, Jack Greenwood; Pen: Cliff Satherley	Referee: Maurice Wetherill

12 September	Papakura	8-18	Manukau	Prince Edward Park, Papakura
3:00	Try: E Pope, Dick Burgess; Con: Dick Burgess		Try: Steve Watene, George Whye, Angus Gault, Peter Mahima; Con: Jack Hemi 2 Pen: Jack Hemi	Referee: Freeman Thompson

==== Major semi-final ====
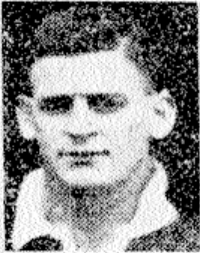
Player coach Allan Seagar played his last game for Devonport before retiring for a second time.

As there were three teams remaining in the competition a draw was made which saw Manukau receive a bye and direct entry into the final. For the resurgent City side Craddock Dufty, playing in the loose forwards for one of the only times in his career, kicked four conversions in their win which saw both teams level 10–10 at halftime. Crucially for Devonport they lost their outstanding fullback George Kerr to a head injury soon after halftime leaving them with 12 players. Allan Seagar took his place at fullback while Ted Scott came off the back of the scrum into the centre three quarter position. Seagar struggled at fullback where he was said to have been "too slow" and clearly injured as he "limped badly in the last 15 minutes". It was to be his last game before retiring once more though he did return for a solitary match in 1938 to assist the side. T. Lynch from Matamata played at first five eighth for City and "gave promise" scoring a try. J.C. Cowan, the Devonport halfback played well while Verdun Scott did likewise in his second game in the five eighths.

19 September	City	20-10	Devonport	Carlaw Park 1
3:00	Try: H.A. McCarthy, Lou Brown, Reginald Johnson, T Lynch; Con: Craddock Dufty 4		Try: Horace Hunt, Reg Hollows; Con: Verdun Scott; Pen: Verdun Scott	Referee: Wilfred Simpson

==== Final ====
Manukau won the Roope Rooster trophy for the first time in their history. Jack Hemi scored twice and kicked two goals, while recent convert from Manukau rugby, Walter Brimble also scored with he and Hemi teaming well in the five eighths. Another of their tries came from forward George (Tiki) Whye who was a well known middle-distance runner from the Otahuhu area and who had played for Ponsonby in 1933–34. He "was tireless in raiding, and, although he threw away a try through his notorious mishandling he had earlier finished off a passing movement in approved style". His try came after Mahima "dummied" the opposition and beat a weak tackle from Jackie Rata. Manukau led 18–5 at halftime and were dominant however they lost the services of Steve Watene early in the second half with an injured shoulder after he was "Unnecessarily bumped" after he passed the ball. Joe Murray replaced Watene at fullback which was the position Murray had occupied for most of the season very effectively. Manukau's halfback, Peter Mahima "was one of the outstanding backs on the ground, and his sharpness from behind the scrum had City in trouble time and time again".

26 September	Manukau	23-10	City	Carlaw Park 1
3:00	Try: Jack Hemi 2, Jack Brodrick, Walter Brimble, George Whye; Con: Jack Hemi, Steve Watene 2 Pen: Jack Hemi		Try: William McLaughlin, Arnold Porteous; Con: Craddock Dufty 2	Referee: Maurice Wetherill

=== Phelan Shield ===
The Phelan Shield was played for by the teams which had been knocked out of the Roope Rooster in the first round. They were however joined in later rounds by the likes of Papakura and Devonport who had been knocked out of the Roope Rooster competition in later rounds.

==== Round 1 ====
12 September	Marist	15-11	Newton	Carlaw Park 1
1:40	Try: Jimmy Chalmers, Andrew Fletcher, Daniel Keane; Con: Robert Aro, John Anderson; Pen: Robert Aro		Try: Lou Hutt, Gibson, Pat Young; Con: Frederick Sissons	Referee: Percy Rogers

12 September	Ponsonby	23-13	Mount Albert	Carlaw Park 2
3:00	Try: Bert Leatherbarrow 2, Edgar Morgan, Selwyn Davis, N McKinney; Con: Bert Leatherbarrow 3 Pen: R Jones		Try: Clarrie Petersen, Alan Watkins, Bruce Constable; Con: Alan Watkins 2	Referee: Wilfred Simpson

==== Semi-finals ====
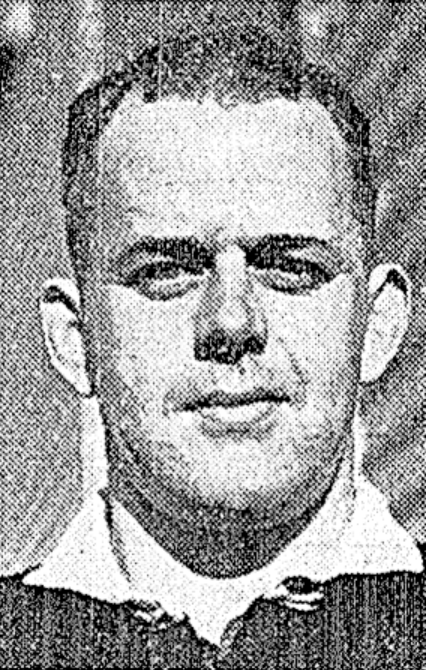
Bert Leatherbarrow (Ponsonby)

Papakura started well against Ponsonby before being well beaten. William (Bill) Cornthwaite, an Auckland rugby union representative 11 times from 1930 to 1932 played well in the five eighths before being injured. Bert Leatherbarrow was the outstanding forward for Ponsonby and scored three tries to go with three goals for 15 personal points. In an unusual feat all six of Ponsonby's forwards scored tries. For Marist John Anderson scored two tries after "showed great pace in the loose" and kicked four goals for 14 of their 17 points in a 17–3 win over Richmond after the score had been 0–0 at halftime. Vincent Bakalich who was fielded in the forwards scored their other try. Richmond was well beaten and had fallen away from their famous form in recent times though they took the chance after being eliminated from the Roope Rooster to try come players out and were also hurt by injuries. Their only try went to five eighth Noel Bickerton. They were missing Ted Mincham, Andy Beyer, Jack Satherley, and brother Cliff Satherley. Jack was playing a rugby game for the Auckland Post and Telegraph side against the Wellington equivalent at Eden Park as curtain raiser to Auckland B v King Country the same day while Cliff was playing for Mt Albert as a guest player on their tour match against Hawkes Bay in Napier. He had spent most of the 1932 season in Hawkes Bay playing rugby for the Marist club there and represented the Hawkes Bay rugby side in six matches. His switch to rugby league came the following season in 1933 when he moved back to Auckland.

19 September	Marist	17-3	Richmond	Carlaw Park 1
1:30	Try: John Anderson 2, John Bakalich; Con: John Anderson 3 Pen: John Anderson		Try: Noel Bickerton	Referee: Frank Thompson

19 September	Ponsonby	36-4	Papakura	Carlaw Park 2
3:00	Try: Bert Leatherbarrow 3, Walter Stockley, Selwyn Davis, Ray Middleton, N McKinney, Oakley Browne, Edgar Morgan, Blackman; Con: Bert Leatherbarrow 2 Pen: Bert Leatherbarrow		Pen: Dick Burgess 2	Referee: Maurice Wetherill

==== Major semi-final ====
Marist were awarded a bye with three teams remaining in the Phelan Shield and progressed directly to the final.

26 September	Ponsonby	19-15	Devonport	Carlaw Park 1
1:30	Try: D.G. Black, Arthur Kay, Frank Halloran, Walter Stockley, Selwyn Davis; Con: R Jones 2		Try: Thorpe, Ted Scott, Len Scott; Con: Verdun Scott, George Kerr; Pen: George Kerr	Referee: Wilfred Simpson

==== Final ====
3 October	Ponsonby	13-9	Marist	Carlaw Park 1
1:40	Try: William Pengelly, R Jones, N McKinney; Con: R Jones 2		Try: Sidney Loader; Con: John Anderson; Pen: John Anderson 2	Referee: Roy Otto

=== Stormont Shield ===
The Stormont Shield had been donated following the death of New Zealand player Bill Stormont by his family. His father John Stormont had died in recent weeks. Richmond totally outplayed Manukau with centre Ted Mincham and halfback Roy Powell their best backs. Their centres and wingers scored six tries between them. Steve Watene was nursing an injured shoulder from a previous game and was forced to go off before halftime when the score was just 10–9 in favour of Richmond. Angus Gault also struggled with an ankle injury for Manukau and "limped throughout the game".

3 October	Richmond	30-9	Manukau	Carlaw Park 1
3:00	Try: Owen Wilkie 2, Bill Telford 2, Ted Mincham 2, J Greenwood, Wally Tittleton; Con: Cliff Satherley, Andy Beyer; Pen: Cliff Satherley		Try: Walter Brimble; Con: Jack Hemi; Pen: Jack Hemi 2	Referee: Maurice Wetherill

=== Top try scorers and point scorers ===
The point scoring lists are compiled from matches played in the Opening round of matches, the Fox Memorial, Roope Rooster, Phelan Shield and Stormont Shield matches which all first grade sides were eligible for competing in (provided they avoided elimination from the knock out competitions). Lou Brown after returning from playing professionally in England once again topped the try scoring lists. Roy Bright who had transferred from Ponsonby had an outstanding season for Newton scoring 14 tries from just 12 games while Richmond's winger Owen Wilkie also scored 14 tries from 18 games. The top point scorer was John Anderson who joined Marist after transferring from the West Coast where he had played for the Blackball club and been a West Coast and South Island representative. Jack Hemi was second and had joined Manukau from Wairarapa where he had been playing rugby union. Remarkably Craddock Dufty featured on the top point scorer lists after a 5-year absence aged 36.

Top try scorers
Rk	Player	Team	Games	Tries
1	Lou Brown	City	18	16
2=	Roy Bright	Newton	12	14
2=	Owen Wilkie	Richmond	18	14
4	Len Scott	Devonport	16	13
5	John Anderson	Marist	19	11
6	Reg Hollows	Devonport	13	9
7=	Arthur Kay	Ponsonby	19	8
7=	Sidney Loader	Marist	14	8
9=	Bill Breed	Marist	17	7
9=	Bert Leatherbarrow	Ponsonby	17	7
9=	Noel Bickerton	Richmond	19	7
9=	Ray Halsey	Mt Albert	14	7
9=	Clarrie Petersen	Mt Albert	16	7
9=	Walter Stockley	Ponsonby	18	7
9=	Angus Gault	Manukau	17	7
9=	Des Herring	Mt Albert	17	7

Top point scorers
Rk	Player	Team	G	T	C	P	DG	Pts
1	John Anderson	Marist	19	11	19	12	0	95
2	Jack Hemi	Manukau	14	4	20	19	1	92
3	Steve Watene	Manukau	17	6	11	9	0	58
4=	Craddock Dufty	City	10	1	15	7	1	49
4=	Tony Milicich	Devonport	16	1	16	7	0	49
4=	Frank Paton	Ponsonby	10	1	17	6	0	49
7	Lou Brown	City	18	16	0	0	0	48
8	Roy Bright	Newton	12	14	2	0	0	46
9=	R.O. Jones	Ponsonby	17	6	6	6	0	42
9=	Owen Wilkie	Richmond	18	14	0	0	0	42

== Senior reserve (Norton Cup) ==
=== Reserve grade standings ===
The Richmond match with Manukau was abandoned with Richmond leading after news arrived that Cowan (a Manukau official) had died earlier in the afternoon at Carlaw Park. Manukau had lost their round 1 match v Devonport by default. The score for the City v Newton round 10 match was not reported, neither was the round 13 match between Richmond and Newton, and the round 14 match between Manukau and Newton also had no score reported. In round 14 Richmond defeated City by default. The 12th round was washed out completely meaning only 13 rounds were played. A 15th round was scheduled on September 5, but there were no results reported indicating the round was not played.

Team	Pld	W	D	L	F	A	Pts
Mount Albert United reserves	13	11	1	1	274	63	23
Marist Old Boys reserves	13	11	0	2	262	65	22
Richmond Rovers reserves	11	8	1	2	166	63	17
Devonport United reserves	13	6	1	6	123	166	13
Ponsonby United reserves	13	5	1	7	118	162	11
City Rovers reserves	12	3	0	9	105	148	6
Newton Rangers reserves	10	2	0	8	38	213	4
Manukau reserves	11	0	0	11	39	245	0

=== Reserve grade fixtures ===
	Date		Score		Score	Referee	Venue
Round 1	2 May	Richmond	17	Mt Albert	7	Roy Otto	Domain, 1:30
-	2 May	Marist	26	City	6	C Boneham	Domain, 1:30
-	2 May	Manukau	LBD	Devonport	LBD	Jack Hawkes	Domain, 3:00
-	2 May	Mount Albert	30	Newton	0	Stuart Billman	Domain, 1:30
Round 2	9 May	Manukau	ABD	Richmond	ABD	Roy Otto	Domain, 3:00
-	9 May	Mount Albert	24	Devonport	10	T Evans	Domain, 1:45
-	9 May	Marist	48	Newton	0	Stuart Billman	Outer Domain, 3:00
-	9 May	Ponsonby	11	City	2	J Hammond	Outer Domain, 1:45
Round 3	16 May	Richmond	13	Mount Albert	13	Roy Otto	Domain, 3:00
-	16 May	Marist	28	Devonport	5	Frank Thompson	Domain, 1:45
-	16 May	Ponsonby	24	Manukau	4	H Taylor	Outer Domain, 3:00
-	16 May	City	15	Newton	5	A Kirkland	Outer Domain, 1:45
Round 4	23 May	City	20	Manukau	6	H Taylor	Domain, 3:00
-	23 May	Mount Albert	25	Ponsonby	3	Percy Rogers	Domain, 1:45
-	23 May	Newton	12	Devonport	7	O Chalmers	Outer Domain, 3:00
-	23 May	Richmond	16	Marist	9	Frank Thompson	Outer Domain, 1:45
Round 5	30 May	Richmond	15	Newton	5	H Taylor	Domain, 1:30
-	30 May	Mount Albert	31	Manukau	3	-	Domain, 1:45
-	30 May	Marist	19	Ponsonby	4	D Taylor	Outer Domain, 1:30
-	30 May	Devonport	24	City	10	-	Devonport Domain, 1:45
Round 6	6 June	Marist	29	Manukau	2	Roy Otto	Carlaw Park 2, 1:30
-	6 June	Ponsonby	12	Newton	5	Frank Thompson	Domain, 3:00
-	6 June	Rchmond	28	Devonport	3	O Chalmers	Domain, 3:00
-	6 June	Mount Albert	16	City	3	-	Outer Domain, 3:00
Round 7	13 June	Mount Albert	16	Marist	10	S Chalmers	Domain, 3:00
-	13 June	Ponsonby	8	Devonport	8	T Evans	Domain, 3:00
-	13 June	Newton	11	Manukau	5	L Dixon	Outer Domain, 3:00
-	13 June	Richmond	11	City	5	Jack Hawkes	Outer Domain, 1:45
Round 8	20 June	Richmond	21	Ponsonby	0	Stuart Billman	Domain, 3:00
-	20 June	Devonport	8	Manukau	0	J Hammond	Domain, 1:30
-	20 June	Marist	11	City	5	O Chalmers	Outer Domain, 3:00
-	20 June	Mount Albert	32	Newton	0	G Kelly	Outer Domain 1:30
Round 9	27 June	Mount Albert	23	Devonport	0	L Dixon	Domain, 3:00
-	27 June	Richmond	35	Manukau	2	A Kirkland	Domain, 3:00
-	27 June	Marist	25	Newton	0	M Renton	Outer Domain, 3:00
-	27 June	Ponsonby	13	City	5	D Taylor	Outer Domain, 1:45
Round 10	4 July	Ponsonby	27	Manukau	10	T Evans	Domain, 3:00
-	4 July	Mount Albert	11	Richmond	7	O Chalmers	Domain, 1:45
-	4 July	City	?	Newton	?	H Taylor?	Outer Domain, 3:00
-	4 July	Marist	16	Devonport	0	H Taylor?	Outer Domain, 1:45
Round 11	18 July	City	24	Manukau	7	O Chalmers	Domain 1, 3:00
-	18 July	Mount Albert	11	Ponsonby	0	Roy Otto	Domain 1, 1:40
-	18 July	Devonport	24	Newton	0	M Benton	Outer Domain, 3:00
-	18 July	Marist	8	Richmond	3	Stuart Billman	Outer Domain, 1:40
Round 12	1 August	Devonport	18	City	10	O Chalmers	Domain, 3:00
-	1 August	Mount Albert	36	Manukau	0	Roy Otto	Domain, 1:40
-	1 August	Richmond	?	Newton	?	T Tracy	Outer Domain, 3:00
-	1 August	Marist	19	Ponsonby	2	D Taylor	Outer Domain, 1:40
Round 13	22 August	Richmond	CCD	Devonport	CCD	O Chalmers	Carlaw Park 2, 1:40
-	22 August	Manukau	CCD	Marist	CCD	G Kelly	Domain, 3:00
-	22 August	City	CCD	Mount Albert	CCD	Roy Otto	Domain, 1:40
-	22 August	Newton	CCD	Ponsonby	CCD	L Dixon	Outer Domain, 3:00
Round 14	29 August	Richmond	WBD	City	LBD	T Evans	Domain 2, 3:00
-	29 August	Marist	14	Mount Albert	6	O Chalmers	Domain 2, 1:40
-	29 August	Devonport	16	Ponsonby	7	M Renton	Devonport Domain, 3:00
-	29 August	Manukau	?	Newton	?	L Dixon	Outer Domain, 1:40

=== Stallard Cup (reserve and senior B knockout) ===
Following the conclusion of the senor reserve and senior B competitions the competitions combined for the second year in a row to compete for the Stallard Cup in a knockout competition. Papakura by winning the senior B competition had been invited to compete for the Roope Rooster, and Otahuhu and Waiuku did not field teams in the Stallard Cup. This meant that just Green Lane and Point Chevalier joined the reserve grade sides. Point Chevalier beat Manukau in round 1, and then received a bye in the second week. They were defeated by Marist in the major semi-final, with Marist progressed to the final where they played Richmond, who had had a bye into the final. Marist won by 13 points to 12 at Carlaw Park. The Green lane senior B side was defeated by City in the first round.

Stallard Cup results
	Date		Score		Score	Referee	Venue
Round 1	12 September	Marist	22	Mount Albert	16	Stuart Billman	Carlaw Park 1, 1:40
-	12 September	City	W	Green Lane	L	O Chalmers	Outer Domain, 3:00
-	12 September	Richmond	7	Ponsonby	2	Roy Otto	Outer Domain, 1:40
-	12 September	Devonport	19	Newton	0	L Dixon	Outer Domain, 3:00
-	12 September	Point Chevalier	11	Manukau	2	T Evans	Outer Domain, 1:45
Minor semi-finals	19 September	Marist	29	City	7	G Kelly	Carlaw Park 2, 1:30
-	19 September	Richmond	28	Devonport	12	Stuart Billman	Outer Domain, 3:00
Major semi-final	26 September	Marist	23	Point Chevalier	7	Stuart Billman	Carlaw Park 2, 3:00
Final	3 October	Marist	13	Richmond	12	Frank Thompson	Carlaw Park 2, 3:00

== Senior B competitions ==
=== Senior B grade standings (Sharman Cup) ===
Point Chevalier were coached by Sonny Hing once again and captained by Archie Lane. They finished third in the championship but won the knockout competition.

Team	Pld	W	D	L	F	A	Pts
Papakura	8	8	0	0	123	23	16
Otahuhu Rovers	8	5	0	3	77	67	10
Point Chevalier	8	4	0	4	83	64	8
Green Lane	8	2	0	6	45	81	4
Waiuku	8	1	0	7	34	127	2

=== Sharman Cup results ===
Green Lane had a player ruled out of order after their match with Otahuhu in round 2 but they were defeated 5–2 anyway. In round 4 Waiuku defeated Papakura 7–6; however, they fielded Roy Bright (formerly of Newton) and he had not been regraded. Waiuku were under the impressions that he was free to play for them as he had not played at all in 1935. The ARL said that it was an unfortunate technicality but they had to adhere to the rules and the match was awarded to Papakura.

	Date		Score		Score	Referee	Venue
Round 1	2 May	Point Chevalier	6	Otahuhu	13	T Evans	Walker Park, Point Chevalier, 3:00
	2 May	Green Lane	5	Papakura	15	O Chalmers	Green Lane, 3:00
Round 2	9 May	Otahuhu	5	Green Lane	2	Frank Thompson	Otahuhu, 3:00
	9 May	Waiuku	?	Point Chevalier	?	A Smith	Waiuku, 3:00
Round 3	16 May	Green Lane	?	Waiuku	?	L Dixon	Green Lane, 3:00
	16 May	Papakura	18	Otahuhu	0	G Kelly	Prince Edward Park, Papakura, 3:00
Round 4	23 May	Point Chevalier	13	Green Lane	8	L Dixon	Walker Park, Point Chevalier, 3:00
	23 May	Waiuku	7	Papakura	6	J Gedye	Waiuku, 3:00
Round 5	30 May	Otahuhu	32	Waiuku	8	Stuart Billman	Otahuhu, 3:00
	30 May	Papakura	16	Pont Chevalier	9	Roy Otto	Prince Edward Park, Papakura, 3:00
Round 6	6 June	Point Chevalier	28	Waiuku	2	D Taylor	Walker Park, Point Chevalier, 3:00
	6 June	Green Lane	3	Otahuhu	15	H Taylor	Green Lane, 3:00
Round 7	13 June	Otahuhu	2	Papakura	16	H Taylor	Otahuhu, 3:00
	13 June	Waiuku	?	Green Lane	?	M Renton	Waiuku, 3:00
Round 8	20 June	Otahuhu	?	Point Chevalier	?	T Evans	Otahuhu, 3:00
	20 June	Papakura	15	Green Lane	5	H Taylor	Prince Edward Park, Papakura, 3:00
Round 9	27 June	Waiuku	?	Otahuhu	?	G Kelly	Waiuku, 3:00
	27 June	Point Chevalier	2	Papakura	12	O Chalmers	Walker Park, Point Chevalier, 3:00
Round 10	4 July	Green Lane	?	Point Chevalier	?	A Kirkland	Green Lane, 3:00
	4 July	Papakura	29	Waiuku	0	L Dixon	Prince Edward, Papakura, 3:00

=== Walmsley Colts Shield ===
After the round 1 match between Waiuku and Green Lane the later team was asked by the ARL why they had fielded a player who was not on the team sheet. There was no score published in the newspapers but the breach of the rules indicates that Waiuku won. Green Lane also fielded an ineligible player in their round 6, 0–0 draw with Point Chevalier, so their opponents were awarded the match. Waiuku would have played Papakura in the final but they could not muster a team and defaulted the match.

==== Results ====
	Date		Score		Score	Referee	Venue
Round 1	11 July	Papakura	16	Otahuhu	6	T Evans	Jellicoe Park, Manurewa, 3:00
-	11 July	Waiuku	?	Green Lane	?	O Chalmers	Waiuku, 3:00
Round 2	18 July	Otahuhu	?	Point Chevalier	?	J Hammond	Domain, 3:00
-	18 July	Green Lane	6	Papakura	8	J Cottingham	Green Lane, 3:00
Round 3	25 July	Otahuhu	?	Waiuku	?	Roy Otto	Otahuhu, 3:00
-	25 July	Point Chevalier	7	Papakura	18	J Cottingham	Walker Park, Point Chevalier, 3:00
Round 4	1 August	Green Lane	?	Otahuhu	?	T Evans	Green Lane, 3:00
-	1 August	Waiuku	?	Point Chevalier	?	A Simpson	Waiuku, 3:00
Round 5	22 August	Otahuhu	LBD	Papakura	WBD	M Renton	Otahuhu, 3:00
-	22 August	Point Chevalier	?	Waiuku	?	J Cottingham	Walker Park, Point Chevalier, 3:00
Round 6	29 August	Point Chevalier	0	Green Lane	0	H Taylor	Walker Park, Point Chevalier, 3:00
-	29 August	Papakura	WBD	Waiuku	LBD	A Lennie	Prince Edward Park, Papakura, 3:00

=== Foster Shield Knock-out ===
Point Chevalier and Green Lane played a 'knock-out' competition match with Point Chevalier winning by 22 points to 9. Papakura had been admitted into the Roope Rooster competition and both Waiuku and Otahuhu had defaulted their recent matches leaving only two senior B teams to contest.

	Date		Score		Score	Referee	Venue
Round 1	11 July	Green Lane	9	Point Chevalier	22	M Renton	Green Lane, 3:00

== Other Club Matches and Lower Grades ==
=== Senior club matches ===
==== Hawke's Bay v Mount Albert ====
In September Mount Albert travelled to Hawke's Bay to take on the local representative side and were victorious 20–16. For Mount Albert Cliff Satherley played as a guest player as he was still registered with Richmond. He moved to Mount Albert the following year where he became player coach.

19 September	Hawkes Bay	11-20	Mount Albert	League Park, Napier
3:00	Try: Rewi, Ponga 2 Con: Brown		Try: Len Schultz 3, Joseph Gunning 2, Clarrie Petersen; Con: Cliff Satherley	Referee: G Bradbury

19 September	Taradale	16-8	Mount Albert Reserves	League Park, Napier
1:30	Try: Gibbs, Unknown x 3 Con: Farquhar, Hepburn		Try: Basil Cranch, Unknown 1 Con: Unknown 1	Referee: B Reid

==== Taumarunui v Manukau ====
On September 19 Manukau played the local Taumarunui side in Manunui as part of an effort to revive the sport in the area. Manukau won in the last minute 30–28. Messrs. D. Wilkie and I. Stonex represented the Auckland Rugby League on the trip. It was hoped that the sport could be established "on a sound footing" from Ōtorohanga to Raetihi.

	Date		Score		Score	Venue	Referee
Manukau Tour Match	19 September	Taumarunui	28	Manukau	30	Manunui, Taumarunui	Jack Hawkes

==== Taumarunui v Richmond ====
On September 26 Richmond also paid a visit to Taumarunui and beat the local side 24–22 before "a good attendance". The Richmond 4th Grade side went down to a "heavy" local team in the curtain-raiser 20–16.

	Date		Score		Score	Venue	Referee
Richmond Tour Match	26 September	Taumarunui	22	Richmond	24	Manunui, Taumarunui	O Chalmers
-	26 September	Taumarunui B	20	Richmond 4th Grade	16	Manunui, Taumarunui	

== Lower grade competitions ==
There were 6 lower grades in 1936 and an additional 3 schoolboy grades. Grades and trophy winners were as follows:

The Points Shields were won by Richmond (Davis Shield) in the open competition for all clubs, while the trophy for just junior clubs was won by Otahuhu (Tracy Inglis' trophy).

=== Junior grade competitions ===
==== 2nd Grade (Hayward Shield) ====
The RV club won the 2nd Grade championship (Hayward Shield). They were a company side named after Harvey and Sons Ltd. The "RV" being a play on the name 'Harvey'. They later joined up to form the well known company Carter Holt Harvey. Mount Albert won the knockout competition (Monteith Shield) following an 18–8 win over RV on August 29 and a 9–0 final win over Richmond on September 5. The Manukau side only had scheduled matches on May 2, and then May 30, June 6, and June 13. On July 25 RV had a bye and played the Northland representative side and lost 10–0. Post season Kamo beat the Mt Albert side 27–8.

Team	Pld	W	D	L	F	A	Pts
RV	9	8	0	1	61	41	16
Mount Albert United	11	5	0	4	64	67	10
Richmond Rovers	11	4	0	7	81	81	8
Glen Ora	10	4	0	4	45	52	8
Manukau Rovers	3	0	0	2	5	15	0

==== 3rd Grade (Walker Cup) ====
Ellerslie won the third grade championship (Benson Cup). They were coached by former New Zealand international Charles Gregory who had coached the Marist senior side the previous two seasons. The competition was split into 2 sections with Ponsonby winning section 1, and Ellerslie section 2. The two teams met in a cross over final on September 19 with Ellerslie winning 11–10. They then met again a week later in the first week of the knockout competition with Ellerslie winning once more by 5 points to 3. City eventually won the knock out competition (Murray Cup) when they defeated Manukau 29–18 on October 31. William Pengelly of the Ponsonby side was awarded Mr. J.F.W. Dickson's medal for the most sportsmanlike player in the grade. RV beat the City club from Whangarei on September 12 in a friendly match.

===== Section 1 =====
Team	Pld	W	D	L	F	A	Pts
Ponsonby United	18	9	0	4	178	75	18
Richmond Rovers	16	9	1	2	215	64	19
City Rovers	16	8	2	1	181	62	18
Ōtāhuhu Rovers	16	8	0	2	139	77	16
Marist Old Boys A	16	4	0	7	71	87	8
Northcote & Birkenhead Ramblers	16	3	0	8	70	115	6
Glenora	16	2	1	5	80	89	5
Point Chevalier B	16	1	0	13	61	326	2

===== Section 2 =====
Team	Pld	W	D	L	F	A	Pts
Ellerslie United	18	11	1	2	222	59	23
Papakura	16	10	1	3	96	57	21
Manukau Rovers	15	8	0	4	128	66	16
Devonport United	15	5	0	5	139	49	10
Newton Rangers	15	5	0	3	77	89	10
RV	14	4	0	9	53	133	8
Point Chevalier A	15	3	1	8	90	130	7
Green Lane	15	2	1	7	50	84	5
Mount Albert United	15	0	0	8	25	210	0

==== 4th Grade (Hospital Cup) ====
City won the fourth grade championship (Hospital Cup) and the knock out competition (Kiwi Shield). The final round of the championship doubled as the first round of the knockout competition with City, Richmond, and Ellerslie recording wins. Then City beat Richmond 11–7, and Ellerslie beating Marist 3–0 (Marist had had a bye in the last round of the championship). Then in the final City won 11 to 9 over Ellerslie on September 19.

Team	Pld	W	D	L	F	A	Pts
City Rovers	14	13	1	0	419	23	27
Richmond Rovers	15	11	1	3	189	47	23
Ellerslie United	15	10	0	4	90	103	20
Marist Old Boys	15	9	0	5	102	85	19
Mount Albert United	15	5	0	8	127	81	10
North Shore Albions	16	5	0	10	67	165	10
Ponsonby United	15	1	0	13	35	293	2
Point Chevalier	14	1	0	11	27	268	2

==== 5th Grade (Endean Shield) ====
Glenora won the fifth grade championship (Endean Shield). Otahuhu winning the knockout competition (Milicich Cup) after beating Northcote in the final on September 12. Otahuhu had defeated Devonport in one semi final with Northcote beating Richmond 5–0 in the other. On their bye round on July 11 Richmond played Waiuku with no result reported while a week later on July 18 Waiuku beat Papakura who were on their bye round.

Team	Pld	W	D	L	F	A	Pts
Glenora	12	7	1	3	120	44	15
Richmond Rovers A	12	5	2	3	80	55	12
Papakura	11	5	0	5	68	42	10
Otahuhu Rovers	12	4	1	2	69	39	9
Northcote & Birkenhead Ramblers	11	4	1	2	50	18	9
Devonport United	12	2	1	6	32	119	5
Newton Rangers	12	2	0	8	41	143	4

==== 6th Grade (Rhodes Shield) ====
The sixth grade championship (Rhodes Shield) was won by Richmond, with City winning the knock-out competition (Hammill Cup). The knockout competition saw Richmond beat Papakura A by default on September 12, and City beat Green Lane 28–0. In the final City won 7–6 over Richmond on September 19.

Team	Pld	W	D	L	F	A	Pts
Richmond Rovers	13	10	0	1	269	19	20
City Rovers	13	9	0	0	222	13	18
Green Lane	15	7	1	5	88	128	15
Papakura A	15	3	1	11	47	230	7
Avondale	12	1	0	11	15	223	2
Papakura B	1	0	0	2	5	28	0

==== 7th Grade (Myers Cup) ====
Otahuhu won the seventh grade championship (Myers Cup), the knock out competition (Oval Shield), and Walmsley Miniature Shield for a special round were both shared by Richmond and City who drew the final 3–3.

Team	Pld	W	D	L	F	A	Pts
Otahuhu Rovers	16	10	0	1	61	14	20
Richmond Rovers	16	9	1	2	162	34	19
City Rovers	16	6	1	2	78	22	13
Northcote & Birkenhead Ramblers	16	6	0	5	101	71	12
Point Chevalier	16	3	0	9	43	152	6
Glenora	15	2	0	6	33	49	4
Marist Old Boys	15	2	0	6	50	80	4
Papakura	7	1	0	3	0	60	2
Ellerslie United	16	0	0	6	8	52	0

=== Schoolboy competitions ===
Harold Green of Avondale donated a trophy for competition by the senior school teams. It was suggested that the trophy be named the Benson Trophy in honour of Mr. Richard Benson, a former chairman of the Auckland Rugby League. A trophy (Bennet Uniform Cup) was presented for the best team in regards to their "playing equipment and general good conduct". Referees would award the teams points each week and it was open to all sides in Auckland including senior teams. The final points were as follows: Northcote 28.41, Mount Albert (Intermediate) 28.09, Newton 26.81, Mount Albert (seniors) 26.33, Marist 26.25, Green Lane 26, Richmond (seniors) 25.3, Ellerslie 25.09, Richmond (Intermediate) 25.09, Ponsonby 24.5, Balmoral 23.89, Otahuhu 23.36, Manukau Rovers 23.3, Avondale 22.66, Devonport 22.

==== Senior (Lou Rout Challenge) ====
Richmond won the championship which had a new trophy named the Rout Trophy, it was in honour of the secretary of the schoolboy committee, Lou Rout. Devonport won the knockout competition after they beat Mt Albert in the final on October 10.

Team	Pld	W	D	L	F	A	Pts
Richmond	18	12	1	3	217	71	25
Devonport	17	7	3	3	179	79	17
Mt Albert	17	4	2	7	74	149	10
Ponsonby	17	2	0	12	45	216	4

==== Intermediate championship (Newport Shield) ====
Richmond won the Intermediate grade championship and the seven-a-side Robert Reid Memorial Shield. Marist won the Eccles Davis Cup for finishing runners up and the Ernest Davis Cup for winning the knockout competition. Intermediate championship runners-up (Eccles Memorial Shield) was awarded to Marist.

Team	Pld	W	D	L	F	A	Pts
Richmond	19	16	2	1	330	67	34
Marist	19	12	3	4	151	98	27
Green Lane	19	12	1	6	129	111	25
Otahuhu	18	10	1	7	163	98	21
Avondale	19	9	0	10	188	152	18
Ellerslie	19	8	1	10	133	149	17
Mount Albert	18	6	1	11	91	171	13
Newton	18	6	1	11	192	136	13
Northcote	19	5	0	14	111	318	10
Manukau	17	4	0	13	115	113	8

==== Intermediate knockout (Ernest Davis Cup) ====
The knockout cup was awarded to Marist.

Team	Pld	W	D	L	Pts
Richmond	13	10	1	2	21
Marist	11	8	3	0	19
Green Lane	10	7	0	3	14
Ellerslie	10	6	1	3	13
Otahuhu	9	4	1	4	9
Newton	9	4	1	4	9
Avondale	10	4	0	6	8
Mount Albert	9	2	1	6	5
Northcote	10	2	0	8	4
Manukau	8	2	0	6	2
Balmoral	8	0	0	8	0

==== 7-a-side Junior championship standings ====
Awarded to Richmond (Walmesley Midget Shield)

Team	Pld	W	D	L	Pts
Richmond A	13	11	2	0	24
Ellerslie	12	8	2	2	18
Mount Albert	13	7	4	2	18
Manukau	10	5	3	2	13
Green Lane	11	5	3	3	13
Devonport	10	5	2	3	12
Newton A	12	4	3	5	11
Newton B	12	5	1	6	11
Otahuhu	13	4	2	7	10
Northcote	10	4	1	5	9
Ponsonby	10	3	3	4	9
Marist	11	1	6	4	8
Richmond B	11	3	2	6	8
Balmoral	5	1	0	4	2
Avondale	6	0	0	6	0

== Auckland representative team ==
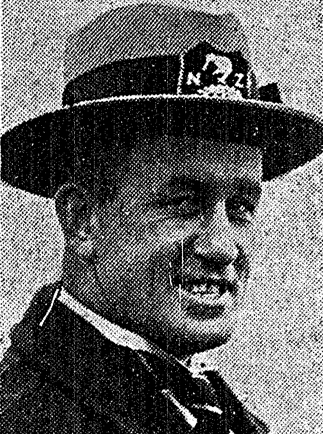
Sole Auckland selector Bert Avery.

Prior to the selection of the selectors for the season Newton Rangers proposed that the representative selector or selectors should have no other position in the game. This was referred to the clubs for eventual decision at the annual general meeting. At the control board meeting on May 13 it was confirmed that Bert Avery would be the sole selector for the Auckland team. He had been nominated by 6 of the 8 senior clubs. Auckland had planned to celebrate the Kings Birthday weekend with a A v B trial match and a match between Auckland and Auckland Maori. However Wellington intimated that they would like to play a match with Auckland on that weekend. The ARL then dropped the A v B match and instead scheduled one between Auckland and Wellington whilst still playing the Auckland v Auckland Māori match as well. The Auckland Rugby League set the ticket prices for the Auckland v England match at 2 shillings and 6 pence. But after many complaints from the clubs that it should not be the same price as a test match the price was lowered to 2 shillings.

Three Auckland players were to play representative football during the season however it was for neither Auckland nor New Zealand. The Northland team to play England required strengthening and so the selector E.J. Parkes chose George Kerr (Devonport), Reginald Haslam (Marist), and Reg Hollows (Devonport). The first two were former Northland players. At the same time the New Zealand first test team was chosen. Nine Auckland players were chosen for the first test with England. Jack Hemi, Len Scott, Wally Tittleton, Lou Brown, Thomas Trevathan, Arthur Kay, Roy Powell, Frank Pickrang, and Steve Watene. Notably the entire back division were Auckland players. For the second test Hemi was replaced by Claude Dempsey and Len Scott was replaced by Ted Mincham meaning that the backline was still composed entirely of Auckland players. Three more Auckland players strengthened the Taranaki side to play Great Britain also, they were Glover, Brimble, and one other unnamed in the papers. Glover was said to have given "an almost flawless display, and Brimble gave a remarkable exhibition as first five-eighth".

=== Auckland (Pākehā) v Tāmaki (Auckland Māori) ===
This was the first time an Auckland Māori side had played against an Auckland Pākehā side. Whilst it was named "Auckland" in 1936 and 1937 it was thereafter named Auckland Pākehā, or simply "Pākehās" in the newspapers.

23 June	Auckland (Pākehā)	21-30	Tāmaki (Auckland Māori)	Carlaw Park 1
3:00	Try: John Anderson 3, Arthur Kay, Harold Tetley; Con: Ted Mincham 2, John Anderson		Try: Peter Mahima, Alex Nathan, Frank Pickrang, P Mannix 2, Steve Watene; Con: Steve Watene 5 Pen: Steve Watene	Referee: Maurice Wetherill

=== Auckland v Wellington ===
The Wellington team.

Ross Jones (Ponsonby) debuted for Auckland along with halfback Frank Halloran (Ponsonby), and hooker Jack Satherley (Richmond). Walter Stockley (Ponsonby), Halloran's former teammate in the Northcote juniors and current teammate for Ponsonby, captained the Auckland team at five eighth. The Wellington side was managed by Ernie Buckland, Kiwi number 30 who debuted for New Zealand in 1909.

23 June	Auckland	25-22	Wellington	Carlaw Park 1
1:30	Try: Ross Jones 2, Reginald Haslam, Walter Stockley 2, Jack Satherley, Clarrie Petersen; Con: Frank Paton 2		Try: N Gladding 2, Joe Cootes 2, Dick Moisley, W Large; Con: J Coman 2	Referee: Wilfred Simpson

=== New Zealand A v New Zealand B (trial match) ===
11 July	New Zealand A	13-16	New Zealand B	Carlaw Park 2
1:40	Try: Sidney Loader, Bill Telford, Angus Gault; Con: Walter Stockley, Frank Halloran		Try: Thomas Trevathan, Bill Breed 2, T O'Connor; Pen: Noel Bickerton, George Kerr	Attendance: 15,000; Referee: Maurice Wetherill

=== North Island v South Island (inter-island match) ===
During the match Reginald Haslam was running with the ball when he began falling into a hole which had fallen into the ground. In the meantime he had passed the ball and play moved away but was forced to stop once the referee realised what had happened. It had formed near a drain where the water had washed away the soil beneath the ground. A ball boy was photographed standing in the hole 'buried' to his waist. The gate receipts for the match were £608 19/ with 15,000 in attendance at the match and the trial curtain-raiser.

11 July	North Island	21-16	South Island	Carlaw Park 1
3:00	Try: Lou Brown 2, Roy Bright, Wally Tittleton, Harold Tetley; Con: John Anderson 2 Pen: John Anderson		Try: E Hendry, J McCarthy; Con: Ces Davison; Pen: Ces Davison 4	Attendance: 15,000; Referee: Percy Rogers

=== Auckland v England ===
The Auckland team had been selected by Bert Avery and coached by Bert Cooke. Auckland competed well against a very strong England team before going down 22–16. Walter Cuthbert donated a trophy (a cap) for the best Auckland player which was selected by an Mr. R.F. Anderton, the touring teams co-manager as being Steve Watene. It was presented to him at the Auckland annual prize giving in November.

25 July	Auckland	16-22	England	Carlaw Park 1
3:00	Try: Lou Brown, Bill Breed; Con: Steve Watene 2 Pen: Steve Watene 3		Try: Alan Edwards 3, Gus Risman, Barney Hudson, Emlyn Jenkins; Con: Gus Risman	Attendance: 14,000; Referee: Maurice Wetherill

=== Auckland Junior representatives ===
The Auckland school representative team travelled to Whangarei to play. The match was a 3–3 draw which meant that the Auckland side retained the Golden Bloom banner.

=== Auckland representative matches played and scorers ===
No	Name	Club Team	Play	Tries	Con	Pen	Points
1	John Anderson	Marist	1	3	1	0	11
2	Steve Watene	Manukau	1	0	2	3	10
3	R Jones	Ponsonby	1	2	0	0	6
3	Walter Stockley	Ponsonby	2	2	0	0	6
5	Ted Mincham	Richmond	1	0	2	0	4
5	Frank Paton	Ponsonby	1	0	2	0	4
7	Arthur Kay	Ponsonby	2	1	0	0	3
7	Harold Tetley	Richmond	2	1	0	0	3
7	Reginald Haslam	Marist	1	1	0	0	3
7	Jack Satherley	Richmond	2	1	0	0	3
7	Clarrie Peterson	Mount Albert	1	1	0	0	3
7	Lou Brown	City	1	1	0	0	3
7	Bill Breed	Marist	1	1	0	0	3
14	Claude Dempsey	Newton	2	0	0	0	0
14	Roy Powell	Richmond	2	0	0	0	0
14	Wally Tittleton	Richmond	2	0	0	0	0
14	Angus Gault	Manukau	2	0	0	0	0
14	Brian Riley	Ponsonby	1	0	0	0	0
14	Hugh Simpson	Devonport	1	0	0	0	0
14	Huck Flanagan	Mount Albert	1	0	0	0	0
14	Lou Hutt	Newton	1	0	0	0	0
14	Edgar Morgan	Ponsonby	1	0	0	0	0
14	Maurice Quirke	Newton	1	0	0	0	0
14	Robert Morrissey	Mount Albert	1	0	0	0	0
14	Tommy Trevathan	Manukau	1	0	0	0	0
14	Frank Halloran	Ponsonby	1	0	0	0	0
14	Bill Telford	Richmond	1	0	0	0	0
14	John Donald	Devonport	1	0	0	0	0
14	Daniel Keane	Marist	1	0	0	0	0
14	Len Scott	Devonport	1	0	0	0	0
14	Roy Bright	Newton	1	0	0	0	0
14	Frank Pickrang	Manukau	1	0	0	0	0

== Tāmaki (Auckland Māori) representative team ==
The Tāmaki team were selected by Ernie Asher. Tāmaki played their first match of the season on June 15 against a Waikato Māori side at Te Kohanga. They lost 43–30 though there was no significant reporting of the match and no scorers or team lists were published. They then played a match for the Waitangi Shield against Takahiwai (Northland Māori) on July 15. The Waitangi Shield had been made by Mr. Harold Walmsley and was originally presented to Hawke's Bay. Taranaki Māori won it from them before losing it to Tāmaki who had held it in recent seasons. The City Rovers side supplied 4 players to the team. City had recruited many Māori players over previous seasons, particularly drawing them from outside Auckland. The newly formed Manukau senior side provided an amazing eight players to the side during the course of the season. This was due to the influence of Steve Watene who had moved from City Rovers to the Manukau side and been part of the recruiting process of Māori players such as Jack Hemi. One very notable inclusion in the side was Ted Brimble. Notable for the fact that he was not Māori. He was the brother of Walter Brimble and Wilfred Brimble. The three brothers had an English father and a Basutu mother, from Africa.

=== Waikato Māori v Tāmaki ===
A mid week match was played between Waikato Māori and Tāmaki on June 15 at Te Kohanga however no individual scoring was reported. The only Tāmaki players named as appearing in the match were Len Kawe, Steve Watene, and Lou Brown. Jack Hemi was said to have missed the game through his injury sustained playing for Manukau.

15 June	Waikato Māori	43-30	Tamaki	Te Kohanga
3:00	Try: Unknown		Try: Unknown	Attendance: 500

=== Tāmaki v Takahiwai (Northland Māori) (Waitangi Shield) ===
15 July	Tāmaki	39-15	Takahiwai (Northland Māori)	Carlaw Park 1
3:00	Try: W Mason 2, Jackie Rata, Noel Bickerton, Peter Mahima, Alex Nathan, George Whye, Tai Raymond, Steve Watene; Con: Jack Hemi 2, Jackie Rata, Steve Watene 3		Try: R Paki, T Toki, W Flesher; Con: T Pitman; Pen: T Pitman 2

=== Tāmaki v Waikato Māori ===
This match was scheduled to be played for the Waitangi Shield at Carlaw Park on July 29 however the weather had been particularly bad during mid winter and the Carlaw Park surface was in fairly poor condition. As a result, the Auckland Rugby League cancelled the match when the weather in that weekend was bad and they wished to protect the surface from further damage prior to the first test between New Zealand and Great Britain due to be played 10 days later.

=== Tāmaki (Auckland Māori) representative matches played and scorers ===
The match with Waikato Māori only saw 3 players named so the appearance statistics are incomplete and the 30 points scored by the side was not attributed to any individual players.

No	Name	Club Team	Play	Tries	Con	Pen	Points
1	Steve Watene	Manukau	3	2	8	1	24
2	W Mason	Manukau	2	2	0	0	6
2	Peter Mahima	Manukau	2	2	0	0	6
2	P Mannix	Waiuku	1	2	0	0	6
5	Jackie Rata	City	2	1	1	0	5
6	Noel Bickerton	Richmond	2	1	0	0	3
6	Frank Pickrang	Manukau	1	1	0	0	3
6	George Whye	Manukau	1	1	0	0	3
6	Tai Raymond	City	1	1	0	0	3
10	Lou Brown	City	3	0	0	0	0
10	Len Kawe	Manukau	3	0	0	0	0
10	Jack Tawhai	City	2	0	0	0	0
10	Ted Brimble	Newton	1	0	0	0	0
10	W Johnson	City	1	0	0	0	0
10	M Proctor	Manukau	1	0	0	0	0

== Rugby league annual ball ==
On October 7 the Auckland Rugby League held their fourth annual ball at the Peter Pan Cabaret. The venue was decorated with blue, black, and white, the colours of Auckland and New Zealand. Tables were also decorated in the colours of the clubs. Arrivals were greeted by the chairman of the ladies committee, Mrs. Ivan Culpan, and Mr. A. Ferguson, chairman of the ball committee.

== Annual General Meetings and Club News ==
- Auckland Rugby League Junior management committee The junior management committee held a meeting on February 26 in order to begin arranging the season's programme as early as possible. They decided to hold their annual meeting on March 17. It was also suggested that every senior club should be compelled to have at least three junior teams. They held their annual meeting at the A.R.L. boardroom on March 17 with chairman Mr. D. Wilkie presiding. It was reported that the previous season had 1,033 players registered with 810 in weighted grades. There were 56 teams. There were twelve nominations for the nine seats on the junior board and the sealed vote of the affiliated clubs resulted in the return of the 1935 members as follows: Messrs, D. Wilkie (chairman), E. Chapman, T. Chernside, A. Hopkinson, T. Carey, I. Stonex, R. Short, G. Taylor and C. Howe. A favourable recommendation was made for compulsory insurance and for an increase of the transfer fee to be paid by senior clubs taking junior players. It was also decided to start the season on May 2. At a meeting of the Junior Control Board on March 31 the Point Chevalier delegate pointed out that the Davis Points Shield for aggregate club points was "difficult to win by junior clubs not having senior teams", and he "suggested that an additional trophy should be open to competition and confined to junior clubs". The members agreed with the suggestion. The transfer fee for junior clubs losing players to senior clubs was increased from £1 to £2.

At the July 22 meeting it was discussed as to whether junior games should be postponed on the Saturday as Auckland was playing the touring Great Britain side. It was decided that the games should go ahead as they needed to progress the various competitions though an exception was made for the 2nd Grade as it was well advanced. The chairman said they were endeavouring to start the matches as early as possible in the morning. It was decided however that the junior grades would be suspended on the weekends of the first and second test as they were being played in Auckland.

- Auckland Rugby League Primary School Management Committee: At a February 26 meeting of the ARL Mr. L. Rout, secretary of the schools' management, said it was proposed to extend the competition to include a grade for secondary school players. The co-operation of senior clubs with school teams was invited. ARL Chairman, G. Grey Campbell said that the schools competition had grown "remarkably and was a distinct asset" and "assured all that there would be no interference with any schoolboy as to what game he elected to play".

They held their 11th annual meeting on March 23 with Mr. R.E. Newport presiding. Their report stated that there were "11 teams in the championship and eight in the seven-a-side tournament, the season had proved most successful and a pronounced advance on the previous year". It was hoped that a schoolboy team could be sent to the South Island to tour. The following officers were elected:- Patron, Dr. M.G. Pezaro; president, Mr. R.E. Newport; vice-presidents, last year's with the addition of Messrs. E. Bennett and R. Shaw, with power to add; hon. secretary, Mr. L. Rout; selector, Mr. S. Dickey. On October 24 the schoolboys held a gala at Carlaw Park. A ten team seven-a-side tournament and running events were decided. Manukau won the seven-a-side tournament after defeating Ellerslie 3–0 in the final. A special seven-a-side match was played between Richmond A and Ngaruawahia with the Waikato side winning 9–0.

- Auckland Rugby League Referees Association At an ARL meeting on February 26 Mr. L.E. Bull chairman of the Referees' Association commended clubs on their sportsmanlike attitude to officials on the fields the previous season. He said that men who proved themselves capable players before the public had a good opportunity to valuably assist the game further in the ranks of the referees. The Referees' Association presented a report in March thanking and congratulating numerous members. P. Rogers and Maurice Wetherill were congratulated on being appointed to referee international fixtures. Mr. R. Otto won the Carey Cup for merit and consistency on the field. At their annual meeting Mr. Les Bull was presiding as president. It was announced that Mr. W. Mincham was celebrating his 25th active year in the code and was congratulated accordingly. Regret was expressed at the resignation of Mr. Arthur Ball due to ill-health. It was also decided to ask the junior board to appoint official line umpires to co-operate on outer grounds. The officers elected were as follows:- President, Mr. Les Bull; vice-president, Mr. J.G. McCowatt; hon. secretary, Mr. W. Simpson; treasurer, Mr. A. Chapman; auditor, Mr. B. Emirali; delegate to the Auckland Board of Control, Mr. W. Mincham; delegate junior management committee, Mr. F. Thompson; delegate to NZ Referees' Association, Mr. Bull; delegate to Referees' Association, Mr. Bull; delegate to Referees' Appointment Board and grading committee, Mr. A. Rae, Mr/ A. Sanders being elected as third man to the control board; executive, Messrs, Maurice Wetherill, T. Evans and R. Otto; social committee, Messrs. Mincham, Otto, Wetherill, and Sanders. At the ARL executive meeting on April 22 Mr. Les Bull was nominated the independent representative on the Referees' Appointment Board. At their meeting on May 18 Mr. P. Rogers was appointed treasurer of the association, succeeding Mr. Emirali. On October 10 the referees held their annual picnic at Henderson Park. The Carey Cup for the most improved junior referee during the season went to Mr. G. Kelly. Mr. L.E. Bull was thanked for his service for many years as president. Various fun sports events were competed for by those in attendance.
- Avondale League Football Club: Avondale fielded teams in the 6th Grade, the Intermediate Schoolboys Grade, and the Junior seven-a-side Grade.
- City Rovers They held their annual meeting at the Auckland League rooms at 7:30 on Thursday, March 12. A "record attendance" was present with Mr. George Hunt presiding. Their 26th annual report mentioned that their senior team, though brilliant at times failed "ultimately through laxity of trainings". The club had spent heavily on equipment and therefore only came out with a slight credit balance for the season. The following officers were elected:- Patron, Mr. Charles Raines; president, Mr. George Hunt; club captain, Mr. Ben Davidson; secretary and treasurer, Mr. Ernie Asher; assistant secretary, Mr. J. Counihan; auditor, Mr. E.H. Phelan; executive committee, Messrs, J. Sullivan, C. Raynes, J. Ragg and Lou Brown (seniors), J. Purdy (reserve grade), G. Miller (thirds), W. Martin (fourths), C. Nicholson (fifths), G.A. Dean (sixths), and S. Dickie (schoolboys); vice-presidents were re-elected with power to add. The club decided to support the remit that all senior teams must field at least three junior sides. Tuesday and Thursday evenings were chosen as training nights with the first general club practice set down for Saturday, March 21. City Rovers secured the services of Jack Rata, a well-known Te Kohanga, Franklin, and Waikato rugby player. On October 18 City held their annual picnic at Motuihi, travelling by the Baroona from the central wharf in the morning. On October 31 the City Rovers' fourth grade championship team were guests at a dinner at the Royal Hotel with club chairman Mr. George Hunt presiding. Their coach, Mr. Chris Olsen, was presented with a club blazer, and Alan Legge received a gold medal as the most improved player. Earlier on the same day the City third grade side had won their knockout competition, defeating Manukau in the final 29–18 at Carlaw Park. It was the final match of rugby league for the 1936 season. Their annual prize giving was held at the Carlton Cabaret on the evening of December 9.
- Devonport United Their annual meeting was held at Hellaby's Buildings in Devonport on Wednesday, March 11 at 7.45pm. Mr. A. Ferguson president of Devonport United presided over the meeting. Thanks was made to their coach Matt Scott, and to Mr. E. Johnson for his coaching of the senior reserve team. The following were elected officers:- Patron, Captain A.W.D. Meiklejohn; vice-patron, Messrs, E. Keely and J. Donald; president, Mr. A. Ferguson; vice-presidents, same as last year, with Messrs, E.H. Scott, L. Watson and J. Oliver; secretary and treasurer, Mr. M. Coghlan; club captain, Frank Bolger; school committee delegate, Mr. W. Aughton; executive committee, Messrs, N. Langton, M Scott, H. Mann, A.W. Seagar, H. Gerrard and P. Foster. Devonport was granted permission to pay Pukemiro (South Auckland) senior and junior teams on the North Shore on April 18 which would be the 'opening day' when other senior teams would be playing a special round of matches at Carlaw Park. They held a muster on April 4 on their home ground at Devonport. H Simpson, their representative forward injured his shoulder and was taken to Auckland Hospital.
- Ellerslie United League Football Club Their annual meeting was held in the Parish Hall in Ellerslie and "drew the largest attendance for several years". Mr. J. McInnarney presided over the meeting. It was said that the balance-sheet showed the club to be in a "very satisfactory position" and the club hoped to enter teams in the second and seventh grade competitions. The following were elected as officers:- Patron, Mr. W.J. Jordan, M.P.; president, Mr. J. McInnarney; vice-presidents, Messrs, R. McIsaacs, A. Chapman, J. Miller, F.E. Woodhams and J. Court, with power to add; club captain, Mr. F. Chapman; hon. secretary and treasurer, Mr. G. Whaley; committee, Messrs. O.D. Slye (chairman), J. Pinches, J. Ryan, R. Hunter, S. Pemberton, J. Welsh, H. Thomas, J. Crawford, A. Britton, T. Bevan and A. Tobin; hon. auditor, Mr. J. Carr. The Ellerslie delegate reported that ex-international Charles Gregory was now coaching their 3rd grade team. On July 21 the Ellerslie Town Board discussed the proposals for floodlighting on the Ellerslie Recreation Reserve for night training. It was decided that the board be responsible for the installation and maintenance of one floodlight on condition that the Ellerslie RL club and the amateur athletic club agree to meet the cost of installing and maintaining one light. Or alternatively that each club installs one light each and pays an additional ground fee of £2 15s annually. On October 31 Ellerslie officials, players and supporters gathered at the Returned Soldiers Hall to honour the third grade team which had won the Auckland championship. Mr. O. Sly presided and presentations were made to Mr. G Whaley, and to Mr. Charles Gregory who was thanked for his coaching of the third grade team. Ellerslie took their seventh grade and schoolboy teams to Tui Glen for a picnic where races were run.
- Glenora Rugby League Football Club Glenora held their annual meeting on March 9. The following officers were elected:- Patron, Mr. Chas. Robertson; vice-patrons, Messrs. H. Douglas and Frank Newton; president, Mr. J. Butterfield; vice-presidents, last year's list with several additions; chairman, Mr. W. McNeil; hon. secretary, Mr. W. McNamara; treasurer, Mr. A. Pearson. Glenora notified its intention to field a seventh grade team. Glenora held a dance on Tuesday May 12 at the Delta Theatre, New Lynn. There were about "125 couples" participating in the evening. Messrs. W. Probert, D. Wilkie and other representatives of various ARL boards were present and congratulated the club on their progress. In late October Glenora held a "social gathering to wind up the season" and Mr. A. Bow, the coach of the 5th grade team which had won the championship, received a trophy in recognition of his services. On December 5 Glenora held their end of season grand presentation dance at the Delta Theatre in New Lynn. The club secretary, Mr. McNamara thanked all members and followers for their support. Mr. Bill Hindman was presented with the Endean Shield and the ARL caps to the fifth grade team who won the championship.
- Green Lane Rugby League Club They held their first ever annual meeting on February 27 with about 50 members in attendance. Mr. W. E. Kane presided over the meeting. Their annual report mentioned that a senior B team was entered in the latter part of the 1935 season and they should be stronger in the future. They elected the following officers:- Patron, Dr. M.G. Pezaro; president, Mr. M. Duffin; vice-presidents, same as last year, with power to add; committee Messrs. W.E. Kane, J. Lawrence, L. Hart, O. Wilson, P. Dunn; hon. secretary, Mr. A. Wilson; hon treasurer, Mr. M. Duffin; club captain, F. Hulme; senior selector, Mr. D. Bird; junior selector, Mr. J. Silva; auditors, Messrs. W.O. Carlaw and J. Hardwick. Green Lane informed the Junior Control Board on March 31 that it had secured its own ground and intended to hold a local opening day on May 2. They were however using the racecourse ground and sharing it with the rugby union side there. On June 26 committee member Mr. William Edward Kane met with a very bad accident at the railway yards. He was loading a truck when another which was being shunted struck him from behind crushing his right leg so badly that it needed to be amputated. The Green Lane club wrote to the ARL informing them of the accident and that they would need to replace him on their board as he recovered. At a meeting of the junior management committee on August 25 Mr. Kane made an appearance after recovering from his injury. He received "a hearty welcome".
- Manukau Rugby League Football Club On February 16 Manukau held their club picnic at Eastern Beach. Several aquatic games were played and a sports programme run. They held a carnival on their new grounds at Albert Street, Onehunga on the 19th, 20th and 21 March to raise funds for training sheds and other improvements. At a meeting in late March with Mr. H.E. Kemp presiding a report was tabled that an ideal site for a ground in Onehunga had been acquired and training sheds would be erected. The club was in a "sound financial position as the result of reorganisation and profitable off-season social activities, and [they] now sought senior status with sound senior and reserve grade sides for competition". They planned to enter teams in every junior grade and alongside school teams in the Auckland competition they would organise a local competition between six schools in the district. At the control board meeting on April 1 Manukau sent a deputation of Messrs. F. House (president) and C. Cowan (secretary) to apply for senior status. The application was deferred for urgent consideration. At the New Zealand Council's meeting on July 30 the transfer of T Toki from Northland to Manukau in Auckland was brought up. Northland said that it was a clear case of "poaching". Mr. C. A. Snedden said that the ARL needed to acquaint itself with all the circumstances first. Mr. W. Liversidge then said that the ARL could not deal with the matter as it was between the Manukau club and Northland. After the conclusion of the competitive season Manukau defeated a combined thirteen which included several juniors at a match at Onehunga.
- Marist Brothers Old Boys League Football Club Marist held their annual meeting at 7.45pm at the Rugby League Rooms on Wednesday, March 4. Mr. J. Sayegh presided over the meeting. They thanked their coaches from the previous season who were Charles Gregory (senior), G. Batchelor (senior reserve), Mullarvy and Thompson (third grade), Bakalich and Mudford (schoolboys), and McElwain, Delihoyde and Fletcher. It was recommended by the outgoing committee that Jim Laird who had spent several months in hospital with water on the knee should receive a benefit match to help compensate him. The club reported that it was in a strong financial position with a credit balance of £168 13/6. The following officers were elected:- Patron, the Rev. Dr. M. J. Liston; president, Mr. J. Sayegh; vice-presidents, same as last year, with power to add; committee, Messrs. J. Regan, Wheaton, W. Madigan, G. Batchelor, J. Ball, W.J.B. McElwain, J. Flynn; hon, secretary, Jack Kirwan; treasurer, P. Fletcher; club captain, Hec Brisbane; J.M.C delegate, Mr. M. Thompson. Towards the end of the meeting Messrs. M.J. Moodabe and J. Molloy who representing the Marist Old Boys Association urged Marist to affiliate with the organisation. A decision was left for the incoming committee to decide later.
- Mount Albert United Rugby League Football Club On Saturday, April 29 Mount Albert arranged a welcome home evening at the Titirangi Kiosk for former player Mr. L.J. Schultz who had returned from England where he had been playing professionally for York since late 1934. It was unclear if he would be able to play for Mount Albert as his contract with York had not been completed but after the club cabled the English Council for information they were told that he was able to play. Mount Albert held their annual meeting at King George's Hall on Monday, March 2, at 8pm. Over 60 members and "friends" attended the meeting with Mr. A.C. Gallagher presiding. He said that for a draw with Devonport United the club "might have created a world's record in the game by winning a senior premiership in its first year". Their eighth report said more was needed to be done to build up the junior grades throughout the district. The club had fielded 5 teams and was coached by J. Johnson and selected by Tom Haddon. The medal for best forward went to H. Flannagan and for most improved back to B. Schultz. R. Morrissey won Mr. Cates cap for best goal kicker. The club reported that it was in a strong financial position with a credit balance of over £130. They elected the following as their officers:- Patron, Mr. R. Ferner, Mayor of Mount Albert; vice-patron, Mr. A.C. Gallagher; vice-presidents last year's with power to add; secretary, Mr. H.G. Shaw: treasurer, Mr. B.W. Davis: club captain, Mr. F. Martin; auditor, Mr. J.C. Johnstone. They thanked their retiring secretary Mr. T. Mooney, and also Clarrie McNeil, their centre who was departing to live in Wellington. The club decided to begin training at the Morningside ground on March 7. In a practice game on April 4 Mount Albert beat Ponsonby 11–8 at Fowld's Park. In mid-October Mount Albert held their annual prize giving at the Manchester Unity Hall with "180 members and friends" in attendance. The Mayor of Mount Albert, Mr. H.A. Anderson presided. The club was congratulated by ARL Chairman Mr. G. Grey Campbell on winning the senior reserve championship and winning the second grade knockout. The president's trophy for official service to the club was won by Mr. H.G. Shaw, secretary. The special trophy of Mr. Richards for the best club player giving attention to training and other points, and open to all grades, went to L. Slattery of the second grade side. Other trophies presented were: Most improved senior player during the season, J. Schultz; reserve grade, E. Dunn; best all-rounder in the second grade, J. Patterson; best club senior schoolboy player, W. Greenhough; and best intermediate schoolboy, I. Sumich.
- Newton Rangers Football Club They held their annual meeting on February 24 at the YMCA rooms. Their 26th annual report disclosed that the club's credit balance increased by £42 12/6, and that they recorded a considerable increase in membership. Mr. A.J. McGregor who had coached the senior side was thanked for his services. The following were elected officers:- Patron, Mr. Matt Hooper; vice patron, Mr. W. Monteith; president, Mr. J. A. Lee, M.P.; vice presidents, twenty-two re-elected, and Messrs. T. Jenyns, S. Watkins, A.E. Lovell, W.J. McGregor, T. Cohen, J. Cox; hon. secretary, Mr. W.E. Cloke; assistant secretary, Mr. G. Matthews; treasurer, Mr. P. Henry; committee, Messrs R. Baddiley, N. Preston, C. Turner, G. Steven, D. Grantley, G. Matthews and W. Dyer; property steward, Mr. S. Barker; club captain, Mr. J.A. Mason. The senior coach and selector was to be decided later. Mr. Baddiley announced that ex-Newton players Trevor Hall, Cyril Blacklaws, and Mortimer Stephens who were all playing for St Helens RFC were presenting a complete set of jerseys and sox, due to arrive for the seniors within the next few weeks. The club said that they intended on fielding two teams in the schools' competition and two teams in the seven-a-side tournament. The organiser of this would be E.F. Hickey, who was made an ex-officio member of the committee. At a following meeting the following were appointed to the executive of the Newton club: Committee, Messrs. E.R. Baddiley (chairman), Barker, Dyer, Matthews, Preston, Steven, Grantly, Turner and Hickey; secretary, Mr. E.W. Cloke; treasurer, Mr. P. Henry; trustees, Messrs. Steven and Rutledge; club captain, Mr. J. A. Mason; selector-coach, Mr. A. J. McGregor. During the season Hon. W.E. Parry, M.P., Minister of Internal Affairs accepted the position of president of the Newton club. The office had been made vacant by the elevation of Mr. J.A. Lee, Under-Secretary to the Prime Minister, to the position of president of the Auckland Rugby League. Following a round 11 match A. Nathan, a Newton forward was involved in a dressing room incident and was suspended by the league for the remainder of the season and all of 1937 with the suspension going to December 31. Newton held a special meeting in committee and reserved the decision arrived at for submission to the Auckland Rugby League management meeting. The appeal was later dismissed by the New Zealand Council. On October 28 Newton had an evening for its schoolboy players at the Paget Hall in Ponsonby. Roy Baddiley, the committee chairman welcomed those in attendance. Mr. G. Grey Campbell presented medals to Tom Graydon, Allan Waters, Albert Moyle (most improved player), Dawson Donaldson, Sydney White, Allan Leaning, Robert McCready, and Jock Sorby. The boys presented their delegate Mr. C. Moyle with a wristlet watch, and Mr. Baddiley an enlarged group photograph of the combined teams.
- Northcote and Birkenhead Ramblers Football Club The club communicated to the Junior Control Board on March 31 that the club had a credit balance of £18 and had registered 15 new players. The Northcote Borough Council agreed with the Ramblers' club that it should share the Stafford Road ground for the season with the rugby club on alternate Saturdays. In June the Northcote club requested floodlighting be installed at Stafford Park. The Northcote Borough Council agreed to the request. A benefit dance was held in aid of Mr. R. Tapp who broke his leg during a match. The dance was held on Saturday night at the Forresters' Hall, Devonport. Mr. Clyde E. Howley was in charge of the floor arrangements and gave a demonstration of the Argentine tango with Mrs. Howley. On August 20 the Northcote and Birkenhead Ramblers League Football Club held their 26th anniversary ball at the King's Theatre in Northcote.
- Otahuhu Rovers R.L.F.C Prior to the commencement of the season the Otahuhu club complained strongly at the Otahuhu Borough Council's decision to grant exclusive playing rights to Sturges Park for the season to the Auckland Rugby Union. Mr. W Arnold said that league football interested in Otahuhu had not been treated fairly in past years, and Mr. W. Bright claimed that the league code should have a fair share of the playing rights. The Mayor, Mr. C.R. Petrie, M.P., said that the maintenance costs of the ground were a burden on ratepayers and that the Otahuhu club representative had told a conference the previous August that a charge of £1 a match for the ground was unreasonable and that the council had received no contact from the club since this time. He went on to say that the council was anxious to assist the league code and "would endeavour, if desired, to make Princes Street reserve or Murphy's Park available. After some "brisk exchanges" the mayor offered to inspect and consider the suitability of the other two parks for the use of league players and this was excepted by the Otahuhu club's delegation. On March 5 the Auckland Rugby League voiced their displeasure at the council's decision. Mr. G. Grey Campbell and Mr. E.J. Phelan were accompanied by officials of the Otahuhu club. Campbell said "the league people feel that an injustice has been done, as they were not advised that the council was prepared to consider tenders". In previous years the council had asked clubs to make applications for the use of the ground and that from the date of the conference in 1935 in August when charges for the park were only suggested and discussed, the "league officials had received no further word until the press report of the council's agreement with the union". Mayor Petrie reiterated what he had said previously that the council saw that the park was being commercialised for sport and that they had decided to "fix definite charges" and that "he had expected to hear some feasible scheme advanced. Instead there had been nothing but criticism". Bright and Campbell spoke further but the mayor declared that he "won't have any more criticism" and a short time later the deputation departed.

The attendance at their annual meeting on March 11 was said to be "easily the best for a number of years". Mr. J. Clark occupied the chair. The club was said to be in a "highly satisfactory" financial position. There was a lengthy discussion on the allocation of the local playing area given the recent controversy over the allocation of Sturges Park exclusively to the rugby union. They decided to nominate teams in the senior B, third intermediate, fourth grade, fifth grade and schoolboys' competitions. The following were elected officers:- Patron, Mr. W.W. Massey; president, Mr. J. Nicholson; vice-presidents, same as last year, with the addition of Messrs, W. Speedy and W. Baxter, with power to add; chairman, Mr. Jim Clark; secretary, Mr. W. Hart; treasurer, Mr. W. Bright; committee, Messrs, W. McManus, J. Graham, W. Gordon, M. Clark, Trevena, W. Whitelaw, M. Ritchie, W. Lockhart, and C. Finlayson. At the control board meeting on April 1, Otahuhu advised that it had arranged an ideal ground in Princess Street, Otahuhu and its request for goal posts was granted. Otahuhu claimed transfer fees for several players at the May 19 junior management meeting. They included R. Halsey and M. Hucker (to Mount Albert), R. Philp and G Whye (to Manukau), and K. Finlayson (to Marist). These transfer fee requests were all referred to the senior board.

- Papakura Rugby League Football Club Pakakura held their annual meeting in early March with Mr. S.H. Godden presiding. The officers elected were: Patron, Mr E.C. Foote; president, Mr H.A. Pollock; vce-presidents, Messrs C. Spencer, L. McVeagh, C. Chhamberlain, F.J. Verner and V. Hardwick; executive, Messrs G. Wilson, V. Ashby, C. Spencer, W. Elliot and L. Mcveigh; club captain, Mr. E.B. Pope; treasurer, Mr R. Walsh; social commit, Messrs Hawley, E. Ashby, R. Richardson, J. McInnes, A. Verner, junior, and H.T. McDonald; grounds committee, Messrs Wellm, A. Hill, A. McVeagh and King; hon. physicians, Drs. G.W. Lock and H. Burrell; auditor, Mr W.K. Francis, junior. Mr H.D. Spinley moved a vote of thanks to the outgoing president for his valuable services. The financial statement showed a credit of £35 5s. Their last season membership totalled 73 players and honorary members. It was also discussed that many members were disinterested in training nights and they were a "farce", and that "payment of club fees was disregarded by more than two-thirds of the players". Papakura applied for the use of Prince Edward Park to the Papakura Town Board on March 23 and stated a desire to beginning practice on the following Saturday.

The cost for installing floodlights at Prince Edward Park for the Papakura club to train under was estimated at £28 by the council. They intended to inform the club to see if they were prepared to pay a portion a rent for the ground to assist with the cost. On April 14 the Papakura town board at their meeting stated that the league club had suggested that two floodlights be erected at Prince Edward park. The cost of each would be £14, including £2 for installation. Mr. H.D. Spinley suggested that "the club pay for one light each. The club had plenty of money, its funds being obtained from Auckland". It was decided to advise the club and ask for their comments. They also planned to ask the Auckland Electric Power Board for the cost of erecting a special floodlight in Queen Street in Papakura to light the playing area in the park, and also whether a slot-meter could be installed. On April 27 at the Papakura Town Board meeting it was virtually decided to install a floodlight where Cooke Street and Queen Street meet which would light up the new portion of the park for practices with a meter being installed. On April 23 the Papakura club held a dance in the Regent Theatre which in spite of bad weather was a "success". After the supper adjournment Mr. Ben Davidson, ex-New Zealand player presented the Foster Memorial Shield to the captain (Mr. E. Pope) of the Papakura senior B team which the team had won 4 out of 5 times. They were also presented with the Walmsley Shield. Papakura secured Ben Davidson as their coach. He intended to travel from Auckland out to Papakura each Wednesday evening and to do so voluntarily. On June 10 Papakura held a club dance at the Regent Theatre that "attracted one of the largest crowds seen at a local dance for some time". Music was supplied by Shalfoon's orchestra. The Papakura Town Board decided that the rugby league club should pay a sum of not less than £5 annually for the use of Prince Edward Park. The club held their carnival dance at the Regent Theatre on August 28 with it crowded to almost capacity with about 300 present. Music was supplied by Epi Shalfoon's orchestra For the Roope Rooster match with Manukau on September 12 the Papakura side fielded three Burgess brothers, two Francis brothers, and two Taylor brothers. The Papakura club held their annual 'smoke' concert in the Regent theatre in Papakura. The building was "packed" and featured music from the S.S. Remuera orchestra led by Mr. Alan Dunker. Numerous people spoke about the administration of the game, the state of the club, and various other matters. On November 28 the Papakura club held their annual picnic at Mr. N.J. Sutherland's farm in south Clevedon. There were nearly 500 people in attendance who had been transported to the venue in "fleets of motor lorries". Various races were held for different age groups and at the conclusion the president of the club, Mr. H. Pollock presented prizes, and Mr. Les McVeagh awarded a silver cup to R. Burgess for winning the cub championship 100 yard race.

- Point Chevalier League Football Club At a meeting of the Junior Control Board on March 31 the Point Chevalier delegate said that the club hoped to enter seven teams.
- Ponsonby United Football Club On February 7 the Ponsonby club along with the Ponsonby Boys' Band, and the Ponsonby Swimming Club held a parade in the evening in Ponsonby. The parade was from the Herne Bay terminus to the Three Lamps and featured three beauty 'queens'. The parade was to raise money for the three organisations. On March 27 the club held a "sing-song at the Leys Institute" with Mr. G. Grey Campbell leading the "happy hour". They then held a collection at their pre-season senor match with Mount Albert at Fowld's Park on April 4. The Ponsonby Queen Carnival concluded on Thursday, April 9 and had raised over £600 to be shared equally between the Ponsonby Boys' Band, the Ponsonby Swimming Club, and the Ponsonby RL club. The Ponsonby RL Queen, Miss Irene Robertson placed third in voting with 41,882.

Bert Cooke was appointed the coach and selector of the Ponsonby United club for the 1936 season after he had retired from playing with Richmond Rovers the previous year. Prior to Ponsonby's round 7 match they secured the services of Ernest Alfred Neale, who had represented Wellington and Auckland at rugby union. On September 5 the Ponsonby 3rd grade team travelled to Whangarei to play the Northland Junior side (Under 11 stone). Northland Juniors won 5 points to 0. In late November the Ponsonby club held a children's fancy dress dance in their clubrooms.

- Richmond Rovers Football Club They held their annual meeting on Thursday, April 5 at 8pm in the Gaiety Hall, Surrey Crescent in Grey Lynn. President Mr. B.W. Davis said that "the club had a record championship year, but the management expected every team to win in 1936". The club fielded ten grade teams and two 7-a-side school teams. They won the senior championship and champion of champions, second, fifth, sixth and seventh grade championships and knock-out, and the school championship. They also won the Davis Points Shield for the most aggregate points in the juniors. The senior teams success was attributed "a great deal" to the coaching of Mr. Thomas McClymont. The report stated that the balance-sheet showed a credit of £184 19/5. The following officers were elected:- Patron, Mr. W.J. Holdsworth; vice-patron, Mr. J. Redwood; president, Mr. B.W. Davis; chairman, Mr. W.A. Swift; hon. secretary and treasurer, Mr. W.R. Dick; delegate to primary schools' management, Mr. C. Rowe; club captain, Mr. R. Hyland; auditor, Mr. Redwood. The existing vice-presidents were re-elected with several other nominations. The Harry Johns Cup (named after a Richmond player who had tragically died after injuries suffered from boxing) was awarded to the Richmond schoolboys team who won 19 games, lost 3, drew 3 and scored 539 points for and only 70 against. Life membership medallions were presented to Messrs. F. Thompson (17 years' service to the club), Ralph Jenkinson (18) and W. Berger (15).
- R.V. Rugby League Football Club: On the evening of February 19 the club held their annual meeting. They elected Mr. E. Muller as chairman; patron, Mr. A. G. Harvey; vice presidents, Mr. D Harvey, Mr. W. Harvey, sen., Mr. W Harvey, jun., Mr. A Harvey, jun., Mr. J McGehan, Mr. Hamilton, Mr. E. Griffiths; secretary, Mr. F. W. Day; treasurer, Mr. C. Smith; committee (two represent each factory), Victoria Street, R. Parr, E. Knight, Albert Street, A. Cloke, J Salter, King's Drive, J Taberner, L. Simpson; selector, trainer, A. Cloke; delegate, Mr. R. Parr; deputy-delegate, Mr. J. Taberner; official linesman, J. Salter; ball custodian, R. Shearer.
- Waiuku Rugby League Football Club: Waiuku beat Papakura in a round 4 match but lost the match as they had fielded C. Bright who was not registered with them. Bright hadn't played in 1935 and was a free agent but he needed to be regraded from senior A to senior B to be eligible. A week later they complained to the ARL that Manukau had taken their senior B halfback (Mahema) to Carlaw Park to play for them instead of being at the Waiuku game. They had since allowed the player a transfer. The senior board of control felt that it was unfair to lose points on a technicality and said that a replayed match might be fairer and this was suggested for the junior control board to consider.

== Senior grade registrations and transfers ==
At their annual meeting on 24 February Newton Rangers announced the following new players, C. Watson (Northern Wairoa Rugby Union rep.) and Joseph Ginders (ex-Richmond), R. Merrick (North Auckland rep.), and R. Robinson (ex-Taranaki rep).

At their annual general meeting Marist nominated the following new playing members, Norman Boyd (N.S.W. rep forward from Leeton), John Anderson (from the Blackball club on the West Coast), Blake (ex-Wellington), William (Bill) Breed (Otahuhu), and Rennie.

At Richmond's annual meeting they welcomed George Tittleton to the club who was a New Zealand representative who had previously been playing in the Waikato.

At their annual meeting City Rovers nominating the following new players: T.C. Allen (ex-Auckland rugby union rep), R.H. Dawson, S. Tipene (Panmure), and Harry Wayne was welcomed back from Taranaki.

At the board of control meeting on April 1 George Kerr was transferred from Newton Rangers to Ellerslie. K. Massey (Devonport) was reinstated and 18 applications were made for senior registration. Robert L. Merrick of the City club in Whangarei transferred to Newton Rangers.

On April 15 at the board of control meeting the following transfers and registrations occurred. H. Crook (Devonport), subject to Newton approval, A.C. Miller (Devonport), from City Rovers; A.C. Greenwood (Devonport), from Otahuhu; Robert L. Merrick (Newton), approved by Northland and the New Zealand Council; J.L. Wall (Ellerslie), to Newton; A.G. Kennedy, of Hobsonville, A.H. Forbes (Kumeu) and T.G. Jordan (Northcote) to Devonport. Transfers:- K. Finlayson, Otahuhu thirds, to Marist Old Boys' senior reserves; R.G. Aro, Ponsonby to Marists; Norman Boyd, Marists to Ponsonby. Clearances:- R. White (Pukemiro), to Newton; George Tittleton and Wally Tittleton, Taupiri to Richmond, approved by South Auckland. J. O'Brien's registration from Huntly with Mount Albert was referred back to South Auckland. Arnold Porteous was reinstated and allowed to play for City Rovers.

At the ARL executive meeting on April 22 the following registrations were accepted: M. Simms (Devonport), A. McGill (Devonport), Wally Tittleton (Richmond), George Tittleton (Richmond), C.J. Glasgow (Newton), Edgar A. Morgan (Ponsonby), A.J. Watkins (Mount Albert). Leonard L. Knock was reinstated and registered with Newton. The following transfer were approved: H. Crook, Newton to Devonport; A. Wicks, Devonport to R.V.; F.R. Halsey, Otahuhu to Mount Albert; M. Hucker, Otahuhu to Mount Albert; V. Barchard, City to Marist.

From the April 29 meeting the following transfers were approved:- Ray Middleton (Newton to Ponsonby); George A. Kerr (Newton to Devonport); Arnold O. Porteous (Newton to City); W. Cuff (Mount Albert to Newton); Midgley (Ponsonby), subject to regrade, Dunn (Ellerslie) and Shippe (Mount Albert), to Green Lane. Ponsonby informed the league that R. Bright and Lou Hutt had been granted transfers to Newton. Other players registered were W. Barlow, T. Allen (City), S.J. Davis, N.L. Parris (Ponsonby), R.L. Haslam, R. Aro, John Anderson (Marist). Arnold Porteous and Leonard L. Knock's re-instatements were approved.

On May 6 the following registrations were approved:- E.A. Jones (Grey Lynn), J. Greenwood (Ponsonby), K Fletcher (Mount Eden), to Richmond; R. Farrington (Eden Terrace) to Ponsonby; H.A. McCarthy (Ponsonby) and W.N. Paine, subject to clearance from Pirates, West Coast, to City; G.L. Breed (Otahuhu, to Marist Old Boys. Clearances:- John Anderson (Marist) from West Coast; H.R. Hadley (Richmond), from NSW; R.O. Jones (Ponsonby), from Wellington; Jack Whye (Manukau), from Otahuhu, subject to registration. Reinstatement:- John Rutherford (Onehunga) to Manukau, subject to transfer from City. Transfers:- H.R. Smith, Point Chevalier to Richmond; R. Philp, Otahuhu to Manukau; A.C. Greenwood, Otahuhu to Devonport.

On May 12 J.T. Silva was granted a transfer from Ellerslie to the Green Lane senior B team. The transfer of J. Kelly from Otahuhu to Green Lane was referred to the senior board while the transfer of E.J. Ginders from Green Lane to Newton was referred back to the board, as Ginders was not considered to come under the rule as applying to junior players.

On May 20 F. Flavell was granted a transfer from Waiuku senior B to Newton Rangers. The transfers of William Tittleton (brother of Wally Tittleton and George Tittleton) from Taupiri to Richmond, and J.F. Wilton from Newton Rangers to Huntly were referred to the New Zealand Council.

The following players were granted transfers on May 27:- Reg Johnson (City to Manukau), D. Tuck (Newton to City), C. Spiro (Mount Albert to City), Richard (Dick) Smith (Devonport to Newton), and T. Pawson (Taupiri to Mt Albert – subject to appeal). H.N. Halliwell and Mervyn Lyon were registered to Mount Albert. N. Pell and C. Bright of Newton were regraded to the Waiuku Senior B team.

A.C. Miller of Grey Lynn registered with the Mount Albert senior reserves on June 3. J.A. Mackinnon of Grey Lynn registered with Newton, F. McR. Murray of Zingari-Richmond RU club in Dunedin registered, as did Peter Mahima who was transferring from Waiuku to Manukau. James J. Shepherd applied for reinstatement after playing for the Hutt RU club in Wellington. He was seeking a clearance from his former City Rovers club to join Richmond.

On June 10 the following transfer was approved: R. Keesing from Ponsonby to Green Lane senior B. Clearances were granted for Carl von Lubbe from West Coast to Auckland; T. Pawson from South Auckland to Auckland; and C.W. Haydon from Wellington to Auckland. The following were registered: W.E. Robinson with Marist; A.W. Carter and J.H. Steele to Ponsonby. R.S. Pyke was regraded from City reserves to Papakura senior B.

On June 17 the following players were registered: J. Reeve to Marist; Bruce Donaldson to Mount Albert; Ernest A. Neale to Devonport; A.L. Beasley to Devonport; H.G. Shalfoon and L. Maddren to Ponsonby; and M. Grey to City. E.G. Williams was granted a transfer from the Kensington club in Whangarei to City subject to approval by the New Zealand Council.

On June 24 H. Perfect was registered with Marist. Ex-NZ international Craddock Dufty came out of retirement and registered with the City club pending approval from his former club Ellerslie. R.M. Farrell registered with Mount Albert. Tai Raymond, an ex-Bay of Plenty rugby union representative was registering with City, as were A. Dent who was joining from Northland, and R. Doonin (of Balmoral).

On July 8 L.G. Andrews and R.J. Hobbs registered with Newton subject to a transfer from Richmond; Fred Moate (of Tokomaru Bay), and A.N. Finlayson (of Northland) registered with Marist. Phil Donovan was reinstated subject to approval by the New Zealand Council.

On July 14 F.C.H. Pope was transferred from City 3rd grade to Newton reserves. G. Phillips transferred from Manukau seniors to Otahuhu senior B, while R.A. Burrell transferred from Papakura to Otahuhu senior B.

The August 19 meeting of the board of control saw the transfer of J. Cooper of the Manaia club at Tuakau to the City Rovers. M. Proctor transferred from Manukau to Newton, while P. Serra from the Addington club in Christchurch joined the Marist Old Boys. N McKinney registered with Ponsonby, and E. McCarthy registered with City.

At the board of control meeting on August 26 R.B. Reed was registered with the Newton Rangers. Former New Zealand international Alf Mitchell was reinstated and transferred from Richmond to Newton pending approval by the New Zealand Council. It is unknown who he had played for in rugby union.

On 29 August at the board meeting T. Lynch was registered with the City Rovers, A. Beyer with Richmond, Lance Evans (ex-Canterbury) with Mount Albert, and D.G. Black (ex Grafton club) with Ponsonby.

On September 9 the following players were registered : Walter P. Brimble with Manukau, Ivan Christoff to Newton, Clive Murdoch and Andrew F. Fletcher to Marist, Morrice D. Dalton to Richmond, Robert Loui, George Marsh and Norman Shalfoon to City. P. Minnix of the Manaia (Tuakau) transferred to City.

On September 16 Bernard J. Patten, Royce Davis, and W. Fleet were registered with the Manukau club. M. Grey was transferred from the City reserves to the Green Lane senior B side.
