= 2010 Auckland Rugby League season =

The 2010 Auckland Rugby League season was the 2010 season of senior rugby league in Auckland. The Auckland Rugby League ran the various competitions. The season commenced on 13 March, with the start of the Phelan Shield, and finished on 28 August with the three senior grand finals. This was the 101st season of the competition, which began in 1910.

The season followed the same format as 2009, with a qualification series in the first half of the year giving sixteen teams the opportunity to enter the Fox Memorial competition.

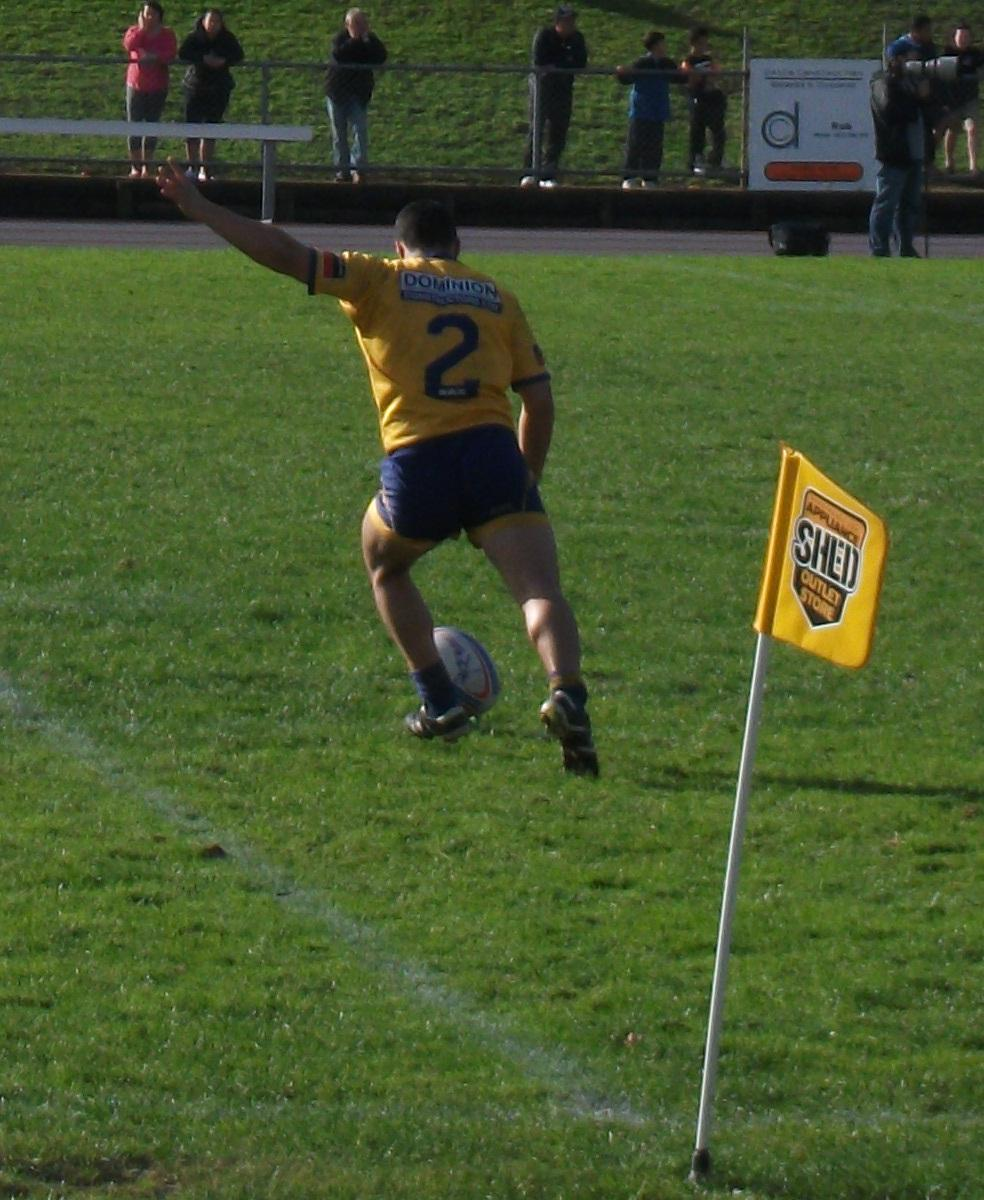
Mt Albert convert in the Fox Memorial grand final

== Fox memorial qualification series ==
The Appliance Shed Fox Memorial Qualification Series involved sixteen teams divided into two pools, with the top eight teams entering the Fox Memorial competition. It started on 20 March and concluded on 2 May. The bottom eight teams instead entered the Sharman Cup.

=== Teams ===
- Papakura were coached by Dean Clark.
- Otahuhu were coached by Richie Blackmore.
- Mt Albert were coached by Steve Buckingham with Ben Lythe as his assistant coach. The team included Matthew Sturm.
- East Coast Bays were coached by Willie Swann & Joe Vagana.
- Te Atatu included former Warrior Malo Solomona.
- The Bay Roskill Vikings were coached by Duane Mann and featured Willie Wolfgramm.

=== Standings ===
Team	Pld	W	D	L	Pts
Otahuhu Leopards	7	7	0	0	14
Howick Hornets	7	6	0	1	12
Mt Albert Lions	7	5	0	2	10
Te Atatu Roosters	7	4	0	3	8
Richmond Bulldogs	7	3	0	4	6
Marist Saints	7	2	0	5	4
Bay Roskill Vikings	7	1	0	6	2
Pakuranga Jaguars	7	0	0	7	0

Team	Pld	W	D	L	Pts
Northcote Tigers	7	6	1	0	13
Glenora Bears	7	6	1	0	13
Manurewa Marlins	7	5	0	2	10
Papakura Sea Eagles	7	3	1	3	7
East Coast Bays Barracudas	7	3	1	3	7
Manukau Magpies	7	2	0	5	4
Mangere East Hawks	7	1	0	6	2
Ponsonby Ponies	7	0	0	7	0

== Phelan shield ==
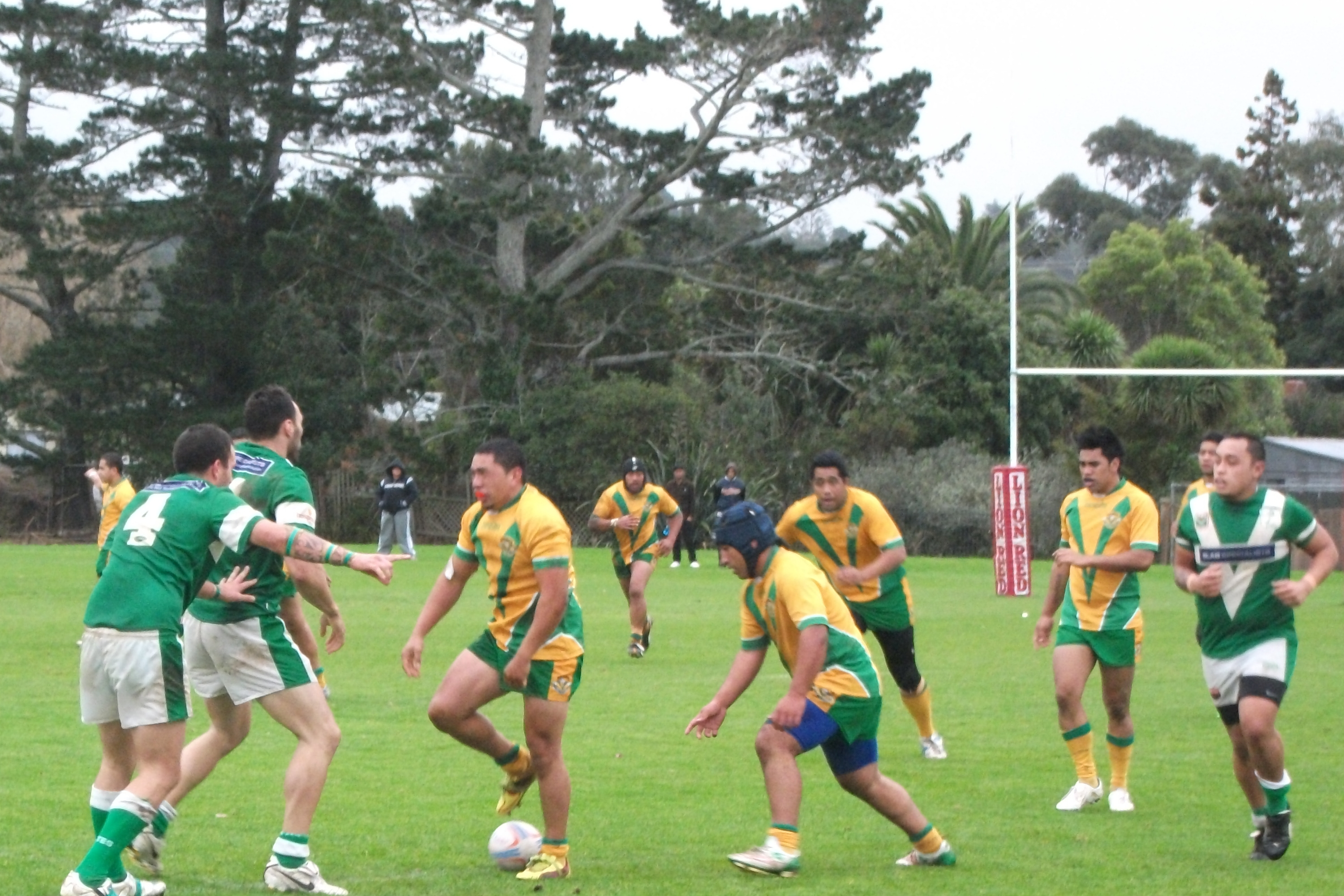
Point Chev v Waitemata in Phelan Shield action

The Mandron Masonry Phelan Shield began on 13 March and featured eleven teams. The Manukau Magpies were the 2009 champions, but in 2010 they were promoted into the Fox Memorial Qualifying series at the expense of the Hibiscus Coast Raiders. The Pukekohe Pythons also replaced the Waiheke Rams.

After finishing last in 2009, the Point Chevalier Pirates received the help of old boys Awen Guttenbeil and Stacey Jones, who were able to attract some high-profile players to the club such as Wairangi Koopu, Monty Betham and Karl Te Nana. They went on to win the minor premiership in their 90th season, losing only two games in the round robin, before beating the Otara Scorpions 37–12 in the grand final.

Team	Pld	W	D	L	B	Pts
Pt Chevalier Pirates	22	18	0	2	2	38
Otara Scorpions	22	14	1	5	2	33
Papatoetoe Panthers	22	14	1	5	2	33
Glenfield Greyhounds	22	11	2	7	2	30
Ellerslie Eagles	22	11	2	7	2	28
New Lynn Stags	22	10	1	9	2	25
Mt Wellington Warriors	22	9	0	11	2	22
Hibiscus Coast Raiders	22	9	0	11	2	22
Navy/North Shore Dolphins	22	4	1	15	2	13
Waitemata Seagulls	22	2	0	18	2	10
Pukekohe Pytons	22	3	2	15	2	10

Semifinals
Pt Chevalier Pirates	22
Otara Scorpions	20
Papatoetoe Panthers	22
Glenfield Greyhounds	20

Preliminary Final
Otara Scorpions	34
Papatoetoe Panthers	28

Grand Final
Pt Chevalier Pirates	37
Otara Scorpions	12

== Sharman cup ==
The bottom eight teams in the Fox Memorial Qualification Series took part in the SAS Sharman Cup. The Howick Hornets were the defending champions but in 2010 they earned a place in the Fox Memorial. The Cup was won by the minor premiers, the East Coast Bays Barracudas, who defeated the Bay Roskill Vikings 34–4.

Team	Pld	W	D	L	Pts
East Coast Bays Barracudas	14	12	0	2	24
Bay Roskill Vikings	14	10	0	4	20
Marist Saints	14	9	1	4	19
Richmond Bulldogs	14	8	1	5	17
Mangere East Hawks	14	6	1	7	13
Manukau Magpies	14	5	1	8	11
Ponsonby Ponies	14	2	0	12	4
Pakuranga Jaguars	14	2	0	12	4

Semifinals
East Coast Bays	16
Bay Roskill Vikings	0
Marist Saints	27
Richmond Bulldogs	24

Preliminary Final
Bay Roskill Vikings	24
Marist Saints	10

Grand Final
East Coast Bays	34
Bay Roskill Vikings	4

== Fox memorial ==
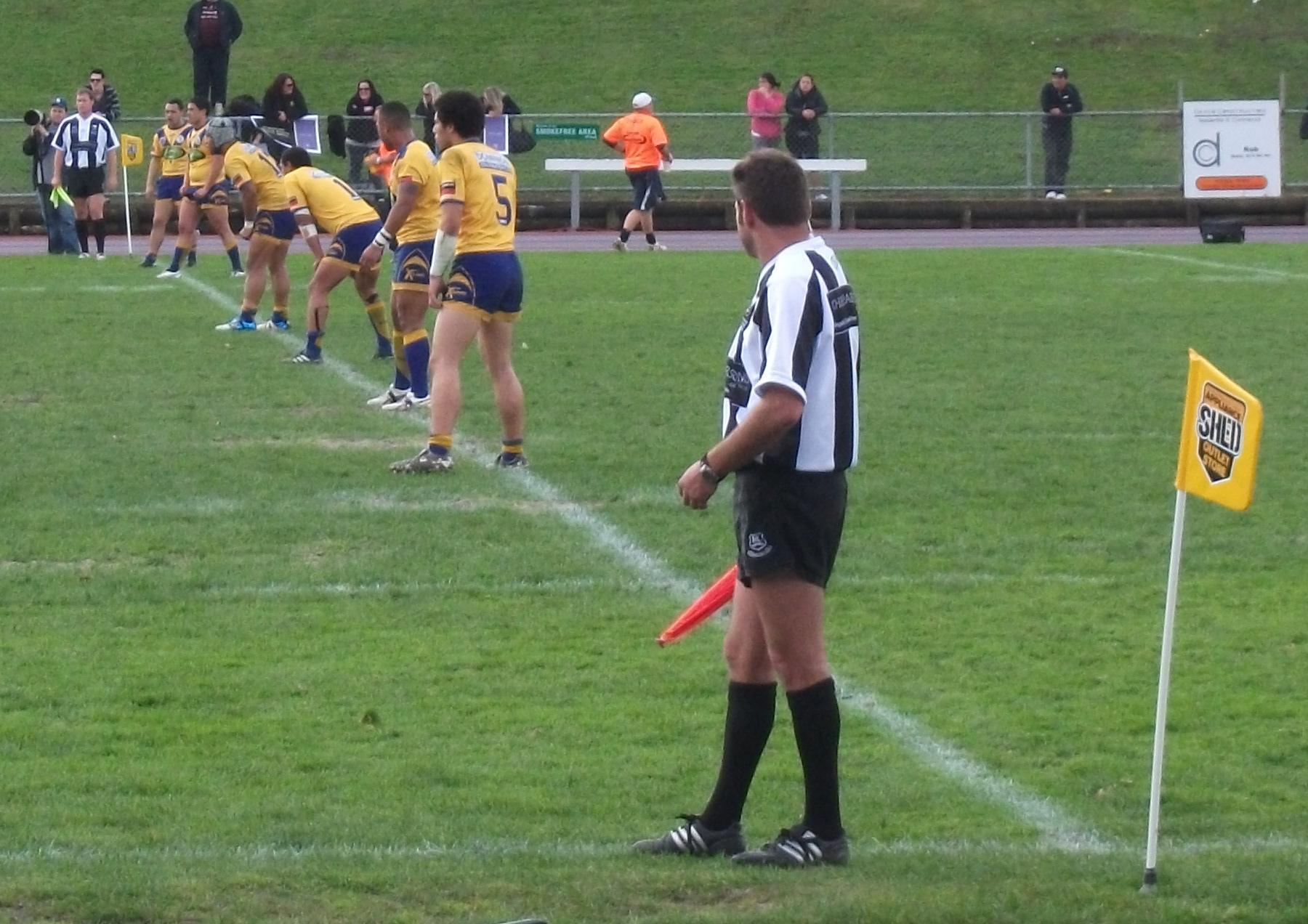
Mt Albert kick off in the Fox Memorial grand final

The top eight teams in the Fox Memorial Qualification Series took part in the Appliance Shed Fox Memorial. The Mt Albert Lions were the defending champions. Round One began with the Otahuhu Leopards and Northcote Tigers playing off for the Stormont Shield and Roope Rooster Challenge Trophy. Otahuhu won this contest and also finished the season as minor premiers to claim to Rukutai Shield.

Otahuhu defeated Mt Albert 22–18 in the grand final to claim the Fox Memorial.

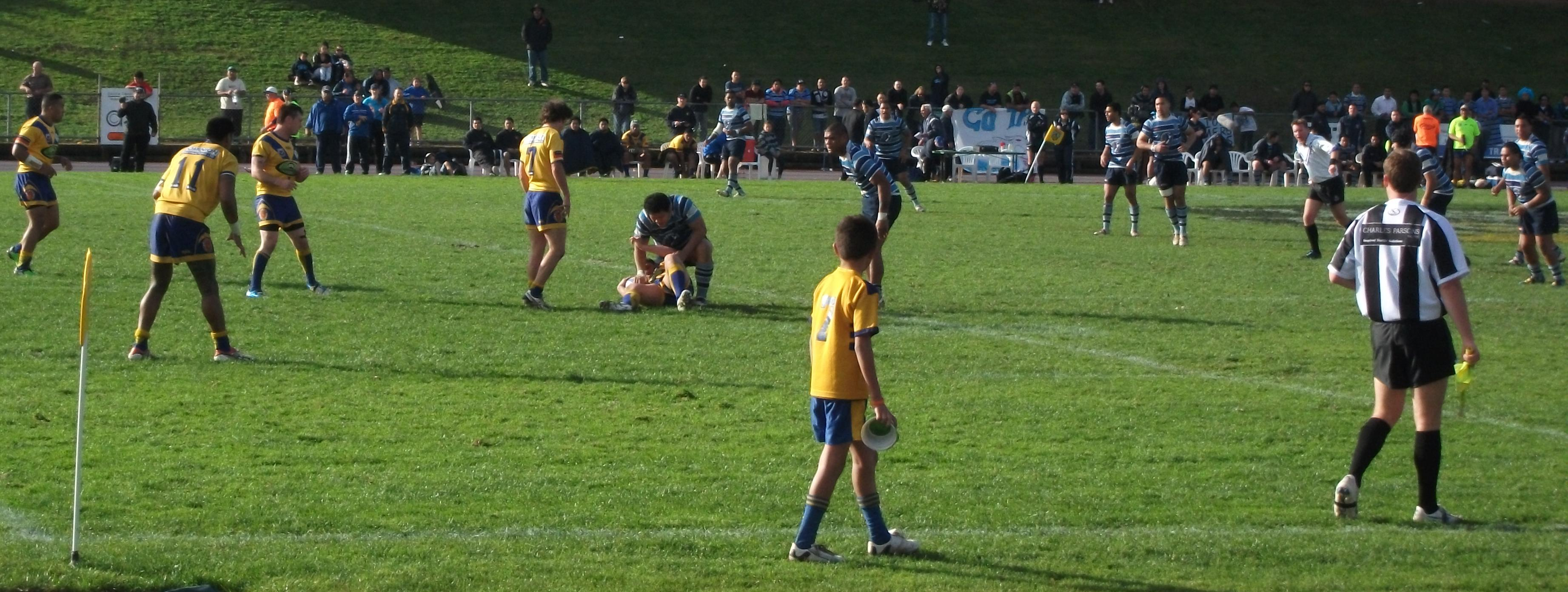
Otahuhu and Mt Albert play in the Fox Memorial grand final

Team	Pld	W	D	L	Pts
Otahuhu Leopards	14	9	3	2	21
Mt Albert Lions	14	9	1	4	19
Howick Hornets	14	9	0	5	18
Te Atatu Roosters	14	8	0	6	16
Glenora Bears	14	7	2	5	16
Northcote Tigers	14	7	1	6	15
Papakura Sea Eagles	14	2	0	12	4
Manurewa Marlins	14	1	1	12	3

Semifinals
Otahuhu Leopards	18
Mt Albert Lions	26
Howick Hornets	8
Te Atatu Roosters	26

Preliminary Final
Otahuhu Leopards	28
Te Atatu Roosters	14

Grand Final
Mt Albert Lions	18
Otahuhu Leopards	22

== Auckland rugby league referees association ==
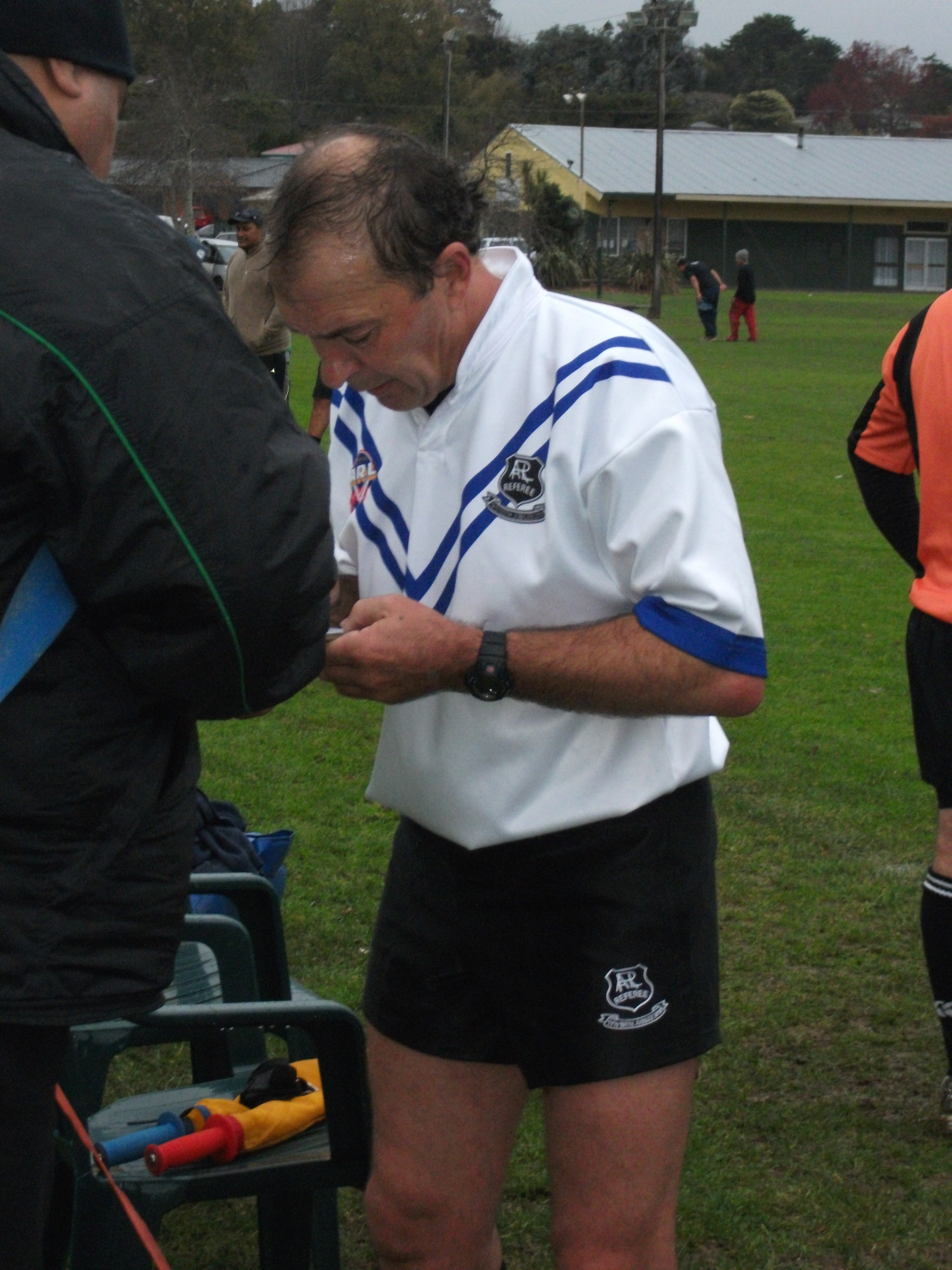
An ARLRA referee in 2010.

The ARL Referees Association celebrated 100 years in 2010 after being founded on 24 May 1910. The referees wore a special centenary strip to celebrate the year.

== High school ==
St. Paul's College won the University Cup as first XIII champions. Tamaki College won the under 85 kg division while St Paul's College won the Graeme Lowe Cup for Under 15's.

== Awards ==
- Player of the Year: Phillip Kahui- Mt Albert
- Coach of the Year: Richard Blackmore – Otahuhu
- Club of the Year: Bay Roskill Vikings
- Volunteer of the Year: Maude Morunga – Papakura
- Top Goal Kicker: Nickolas Lythgo – Marist
- Top Try Scorer: Phillip Kahui- Mt Albert
- Referee of the Year: Craig Pascoe
- Rookie of the Year: Phillip Pese – Te Atatu

Team of the Year:

- Fullback – James Blackwell (Otahuhu)
- Winger – Phillip Kahui (Mt Albert)
- Centre – Jonathan Carl (Te Atatu)
- Stand-off – Gavin Bailey (Glenora)
- Halfback – Trent Wallace (Mt Albert)
- Prop – Freddie Turuwhenua (Otahuhu)
- Hooker – Darrin Kingi (Manurewa)
- 2nd Row – Setu Matafeo (Northcote)
- Lock – Roman Hifo (Papakura)

Preceded by 2009	101st Auckland Rugby League season 2010	Succeeded by 2011
