= 2009 Auckland Rugby League season =

The 2009 Auckland Rugby League season was the 2009 season of senior rugby league in Auckland. The Auckland Rugby League ran the various competitions. The season commenced on 14 March with the start of the Phelan Shield and ended on 5 September with the Fox Memorial Grand Final. This was the 100th season of the competition, which began with the 1910 season.

The season followed the same format as 2008, with a qualification series in the first half of the year giving sixteen teams the opportunity to enter the Fox Memorial competition.

Beginning 7 June two games a week were broadcast in both English and Māori on Māori Television and Te Reo respectively.

== Fox Memorial qualification series ==
The Lion Red Fox Memorial Qualification Series involved sixteen teams divided into two pools, with the top eight teams entering the Fox Memorial competition. It started on 21 March and concluded on 2 May. The bottom eight teams instead entered the Sharman Cup.

Pool A	Pool B
Papakura Sea Eagles; Marist Saints; Mt Albert Lions; Northcote Tigers; Richmond Bulldogs; Howick Hornets; Mangere East Hawks; Bay Roskill Vikings	Otahuhu Leopards; East Coast Bays Barracudas; Te Atatu Roosters; Manurewa Marlins; Ponsonby Ponies; Glenora Bears; Pakuranga Jaguars; Hibiscus Coast Raiders

== Phelan shield ==
The Mandron Masonry Phelan Shield began on 14 March and features eleven teams. The regular season concluded on 5 September with a grand final. The New Lynn Stags were the defending champions. Minor premiers the Manukau Magpies defeated the Waiheke Rams in the final to win the Shield.

Team	Pld	W	D	L	B	Pts
Manukau Magpies	20	16	2	2	2	36
Waiheke Rams	20	14	3	3	2	36
New Lynn Stags	20	13	0	7	2	32
Glenfield Greyhounds	20	13	2	5	2	32
Papatoetoe Panthers	20	10	0	10	2	24
Ellerslie Eagles	20	9	2	9	2	24
Navy/North Shore Dolphins	20	9	1	10	2	23
Otara Scorpions	20	8	0	12	2	20
Mt Wellington Warriors	20	6	1	13	2	17
Waitemata Seagulls	20	4	1	15	2	14
Pt Chevalier Pirates	20	1	2	17	2	6

Semifinals
Manukau Magpies	24
Waiheke Rams	20
New Lynn Stags	56
Glenfield Greyhounds	8

Preliminary Final
Waiheke Rams	28'
New Lynn Stags	26

Grand Final
Manukau Magpies	26
Waiheke Rams	16

== Sharman cup ==
The bottom eight teams in the Fox Memorial Qualification Series took part in the SAS Sharman Cup. The Richmond Bulldogs were the defending champions. The grand final was held on 5 September and saw minor premiers the Howick Hornets defeat the Glenora Bears 19–12 to win the Cup. Hibiscus Coast were relegated to the Phelan Shield with the Manukau Magpies being promoted.

Team	Pld	W	D	L	Pts
Howick Hornets	14	12	1	1	25
Richmond Bulldogs	14	12	0	2	24
Glenora Bears	14	10	1	3	21
Mangere East Hawks	14	6	1	7	13
Bay Roskill Vikings	14	5	0	9	10
Ponsonby Ponies	14	4	1	9	9
Pakuranga Jaguars	14	3	0	11	6
Hibiscus Coast Raiders	14	2	0	12	4

Semifinals
Howick Hornets	44
Richmond Bulldogs	14
Glenora Bears	38
Mangere East Hawks	18

Preliminary Final
Richmond Bulldogs	18
Glenora Bears	31

Grand Final
Howick Hornets	19
Glenora Bears	12

== Fox memorial ==
The top eight teams in the Fox Memorial Qualification Series took part in the Lion Red Fox Memorial. The Mt Albert Lions were the defending champions and managed to defend their title, defeating the Papakura Sea Eagles 32–10 in the final.

As minor premiers, the Otahuhu Leopards were awarded the Rukutai Shield.

Team	Pld	W	D	L	Pts
Otahuhu Leopards	14	11	0	3	22
Mt Albert Lions	14	11	0	3	22
Papakura Sea Eagles	14	10	0	4	20
East Coast Bays Barracudas	14	8	0	6	16
Marist Saints	14	6	0	8	12
Northcote Tigers	14	6	0	8	12
Te Atatu Roosters	14	3	0	11	6
Manurewa Marlins	14	1	0	13	2

Semifinals
Otahuhu Leopards	24
Mt Albert Lions	40
Papakura Sea Eagles	25
East Coast Bays Barracudas	20

Preliminary Final
Otahuhu Leopards	20
Papakura Sea Eagles	26

Grand Final
Mt Albert Lions	32
Papakura Sea Eagles	10

== Awards ==
The Auckland Rugby League's 2009 Awards were announced on 24 October.

Lion Red Fox Memorial Player of the Year: Phillip Kahui (Mt Albert)

George Rainey Medal Fox Memorial Team of the Year:
Fullback: James Blackwell (Otahuhu)
Winger: Phillip Kahui (Mt Albert)
Centre: Toshio Laiseni (Papakura)
Standoff: Zensei Inu (Te Atatu)
Halfback: Aaron Woodhouse (Manurewa)
Prop: Dylan Davis (Marist)
Hooker: Zac Tippins (Te Atatu)
2nd Row: Sala Faalogo (Mt Albert)
Lock: Tui Samoa (East Coast Bays)

Mandron Masonry Phelan Shield Player of the Year: Itaifale Tolefoa (Navy/North Shore Dolphins)
SAS Sharman Cup Player of the Year: Aaron Booth (Glenora Bears)
Māori Television Rookie of the Year: Stephen Shennan (Te Atatu Roosters)
Premiership Coach of the Year: Brent Gemmell (Mt Albert)

Preceded by 2008	100th Auckland Rugby League season 2009	Succeeded by 2010
