= Fox Memorial grand finals =

New Zealand rugby league championship

The Fox Memorial is awarded to the premier club rugby league champions in the Auckland Rugby League. It was first awarded in 1931 and is named after Edward Vincent Fox who played for North Shore Albions, and represented Auckland in 1914. He fought in World War I and received leg injuries in 1916 which ended his playing career. The first ever grand final was played in 1958 between Ponsonby and Otahuhu. Prior to this the trophy was awarded to the team at the top of the standings from the regular season though occasionally a playoff was needed to decide the champion (for a list of these teams see below). The majority of the grand finals were played at Carlaw Park, but after the ground was vacated by Auckland Rugby League in the early 2000s the games have usually been played at Mt Smart Stadium.

== Fox Memorial grand final appearances ==
Team	Winner	Runner up
Mt Albert	12	11
Otahuhu	12	14
Northcote	7	2
Point Chevalier	6	2
Glenora	5	8
Ponsonby	4	3
Eastern United	4	0
Richmond	3	4
Marist Brothers	2	2
Howick	2	0
Manurewa	2	0
Mangere East	1	6
Papakura	1	5
Te Atatu	1	3
Southern Districts (Otahuhu, Papakura & Papatoetoe)	1	1
Ellerslie	1	1
Hibiscus Coast	1	1
Western United (Mt Albert & Pt Chevalier)	1	0
Mt Wellington	1	0
Otara	1	0
Manukau	0	1

== Fox Memorial grand finals ==
In brackets is the number of championships each club has won following their wins.

Year	Winners	Score	Runners up
1958	Ponsonby (9)	16–7	Otahuhu
1959	Western United (Mt Albert & Pt Chevalier) (1)	15–0	Richmond
1960	Eastern United (1) & Southern Districts (Otahuhu, Papakura & Papatoetoe) (1)	7–7 *title shared	
1961	Eastern United (2)	24–7	Glenora
1962	Eastern United (3) & Glenora (1)	17–17 *title shared	
1963	Eastern United (4)	8–0	Southern Districts
1964	Otahuhu (2)	no final*	
1965	Marist Brothers (5)	19–6	Glenora
1966	Marist Brothers (6)	24–7	Ponsonby
1967	Ponsonby (10)	12–9	Otahuhu
1968	Mt Albert (5)	12–7	Ponsonby
1969	Mt Albert (6)	20–0	Marist Brothers
1970	Otahuhu (3)	10–5	Mt Albert
1971	Otahuhu (4)	25–12	Mt Albert
1972	Ponsonby (11)	14–12	Ellerslie
1973	Ponsonby (12)	15–5	Otahuhu
1974	Ellerslie (2)	16–8	Ponsonby
1975	Otahuhu (5)	22–8	Northcote
1976	Mt Wellington (1)	20–12	Glenora
1977	Otahuhu (6)	11–3	Richmond
1978	Otahuhu (7)	18–4	Mangere East
1979	Richmond (10)	16–15	Otahuhu
1980	Richmond (11)	21–15	Otahuhu
1981	Mt Albert (7)	18–7	Glenora
1982	Mt Albert (8)	18–8	Otahuhu
1983	Otahuhu (8)	14–11	Mt Albert
1984	Mt Albert (9)	25–6	Otahuhu
1985	Mt Albert (10)	24–19	Manukau Magpies
1986	Mount Albert Lions (11)	31–4	Te Atatu Roosters
1987	Northcote Tigers (1)	12–8	Mangere East Hawks
1988	Te Atatu Roosters (1)	22–16	Glenora Bears
1989	Northcote Tigers (2)	30–14	Mangere East Hawks
1990	Otahuhu Leopards (9)	28–14	Te Atatu Roosters
1991	Northcote Tigers (3)	23–20	Otahuhu Leopards
1992	Northcote Tigers (4)	16–11	Mt Albert
1993	Northcote (5)	29–10	Te Atatu
1994	Northcote (6)	32–12	Otahuhu
1995	Otahuhu (10)	32–0	Marist Brothers
1996	Otara (1)	36–28 (triple extra time)	Otahuhu
1997	Glenora (2)	34–14	Mangere East
1998	Glenora (3)	35–6	Mangere East
1999	Glenora (4)	24–4	Otahuhu
2000	Otahuhu (11)	21–14	Richmond
2001	Northcote (7)	30–29	Richmond
2002	Hibiscus Coast (1)	44–40 (double extra time)	Otahuhu
2003	Mangere East (1)	30–29	Hibiscus Coast
2004	Mt Albert (12)	14–10	Mangere East
2005	Manurewa (1)	34–24	Papakura
2006	Mt Albert (13)	49–6	Papakura
2007	Manurewa (2)	28–20	Papakura
2008	Mt Albert (14)	24–22	Otahuhu
2009	Mt Albert (15)	32–10	Papakura
2010	Otahuhu (12)	22–18	Mt Albert
2011	Howick (1)	24–14	Otahuhu
2012	Mt Albert (16)	58–10	Glenora
2013	Pt Chevalier (2)	24–22	Mt Albert
2014	Pt Chevalier (3)	18–17	Mt Albert
2015	Pt Chevalier (4)	22–10	Mt Albert
2016	Papakura (1)	12–8	Pt Chevalier
2017	Glenora (5)	26–0	Pt Chevalier
2018	Pt Chevalier (5)	6–0	Glenora
2019	Howick (2)	22–18 (aet: 18–18)	Mt Albert
2020	Not Played		
2021	Not Played		
2022	Point Chevalier Pirates (6)	14–12	Glenora Bears
2023	Point Chevalier Pirates (7)	24-16	Richmond
2024	Richmond (12)	15-14 (aet: 14–14)	Papakura
2025	Otahuhu (13)	8-4	Mt Albert
2026	Otahuhu (14)	20-16	Mt Albert

- In 1964 the competition was reverting to its original composition with individual suburban clubs. Auckland Rugby League had enforced a district competition for several years with clubs merging to form teams geographically. As a result, there was a larger first division in 1964 and no final was played as a way of reintroducing the club competition.

Year	Winners
1910	City (1)
1911	City (2)
1912	Newton (1)
1913	North Shore (1)
1914	North Shore (2)
1915	Grafton (1)
1916	City (3)
1917	Ponsonby (1)
1918	Ponsonby (2)
1919	Ponsonby (3)
1920	Maritime (1)
1921	City (4)
1922	City (5)
1923	City (6)
1924	Marist Brothers (1)
1925	City (7)
1926	Ponsonby (4)
1927	Newton (2)
1928	Devonport (1)
1929	Ponsonby (5)
1930	Ponsonby (6)
1931	Marist Brothers (2)
1932	Devonport (2)
1933	Devonport (3)
1934	Richmond (1)
1935	Richmond (2)
1936	Manukau (1)
1937	Richmond (3)
1938	Marist Brothers (3)
1939	Mt Albert (1)
1940	Richmond (4)
1941	North Shore (3)
1942	Manukau (2)
1943	Manukau (3)
1944	City (8)
1945	Otahuhu (1)
1946	Richmond (5)
1947	Mt Albert (2)
1948	Marist Brothers (4)
1949	Richmond (6)
1950	Mt Albert (3)
1951	Richmond (7) & Mt Albert (4)
1952	Ponsonby (7)
1953	Pt Chevalier (1)
1954	Ponsonby (8)
1955	Richmond (8)
1956	Richmond (9)
1957	Ellerslie (1)
