= Auckland Rugby League club trophies =

Rugby tournament in new Zealand

The Auckland Rugby League competition has been competed for since 1909 when the first organised match was played between North Shore and City Rovers (won 44–22 by North Shore). The following year an official champion was crowned for the first time, namely the City Rovers club who won the 1910 1st Grade title and were one of the 4 original teams at that time (City Rovers, Devonport United, Newton Rangers, and Ponsonby United). Over the following 110 years many team and individual trophies have been awarded. The following is a list of the clubs and individuals that they have been awarded to at the premier-grade level.

== Trophies ==
There are approximately 24 trophies which have been competed for in Auckland Rugby League history by clubs. These include the following for teams; Fox Memorial Shield, Rukutai Shield, Roope Rooster, Stormont Shield, Kiwi Shield, A.R.L. Trophy, Sharman Cup, Lawson Cup, Walmsley Shield, ARL Cup, Norton Cup, Gillett Cup and the Autex Award. Several have also been awarded to players including the Lipscombe Cup, Rothville Trophy, Bert Humphries Memorial, Tetley Trophy, Painter Trophy, Hyland Memorial Cup, Doug Price Memorial Medal, Jack Counihand Trophy, Harry Mackwood Trophy and the Simons Scroll.

=== Explanation of team trophies ===
- The Fox Memorial is awarded to the grand final winner of Premier One and is considered the most prestigious trophy in Auckland club rugby league. It was named after Edward Vincent Fox who played for North Shore, and Auckland before going to fight in World War I. He was awarded a medal for bravery but suffered a leg injury ending his playing career. From 1910 to 1919 the first grade trophy awarded was the Myers Cup. In the war years the trophy was not officially awarded. Then from 1920 to 1930 the Monteith Shield was awarded to the first grade champions. It was named after the man who had donated it to the league.
- The Rukutai Shield is awarded to the Premier One minor or premiership champions at the end of the regular season. It is named after Jim Rukutai who was an early player in Auckland Rugby League and later became the youngest-ever coach of New Zealand at the age of 33.
- The Roope Rooster was first competed for in 1915. It was named after Dick Roope who donated the trophy when he was Auckland Rugby League Chairman. For the first few decades of its existence it was a knockout competition played after the championship was completed but later moved to being a pre-season competition. In 2006 it changed format when it became a trophy which only changes hand when the holder of the trophy loses a match on their home ground.
- The Stormont Shield is named after Bill Stormont (William Devanney Stormont), a World War I veteran who played for the Marist club and for the Kiwis. The Shield is a champion of champions playoff between the Fox Memorial and Roope Rooster winners and has been competed for since 1925.
- The Kiwi Shield is awarded to the Premier One club with the most points scored from Premiers and Reserves (x1).
- Club of the Year. Awarded to the club in Auckland considered to have achieved the most in an all-round sense.

=== Premier One titles ===
Year	Myers Cup/Monteith Shield/Fox Memorial Shield	Rukutai Shield	Roope Rooster	Stormont Shield	Kiwi Shield	Club of the Year
1910	City Rovers (1)	–	–	–	–	
1911	City Rovers (2)	–	–	–	–	
1912	Newton Rangers (1)	–	–	–	–	
1913	North Shore Albions (1)	–	–	–	–	
1914	North Shore Albions (2)	–	–	–	–	
1915	Grafton Athletic (1)	–	North Shore (1)	–	–	
1916	City Rovers (3)	–	City Rovers (1)	–	–	
1917	Ponsonby United (1)	–	Ponsonby United (1)	–	–	
1918	Ponsonby United (2)	–	City Rovers (2)	–	–	
1919	Ponsonby United (3)	–	Newton Rangers (1)	–	–	
1920	Maritime (1)	–	Newton Rangers (2)	–	–	
1921	City Rovers (4)	–	City Rovers (3)	–	–	
1922	City Rovers (5)	–	Ponsonby United (2)	–	–	
1923	City Rovers (6)	–	Ponsonby United (3)	–	–	
1924	Marist Old Boys (1)	–	City Rovers (4)	–	–	
1925	City Rovers (7)	–	Ponsonby United (4)	Ponsonby United (1)	–	
1926	Ponsonby United (4)	–	Richmond Rovers (1)	Ponsonby United (2)	–	
1927	Newton Rangers (2)	–	Richmond Rovers (2)	Newton Rangers (1)	–	
1928	Devonport United (3)	–	Marist Old Boys (1)	Marist Old Boys (1)	–	
1929	Ponsonby United (5)	–	Marist Old Boys (2)	Marist Old Boys (2)	–	
1930	Ponsonby United (6)	–	Ponsonby United (5)	Devonport United (1)	–	
1931	Marist Old Boys (2)	–	Devonport United (1)	Devonport United (2)	–	
1932	Devonport United (4)	–	Marist Old Boys (3)	Marist Old Boys (3)	–	
1933	Devonport United (5)	–	Richmond Rovers (3)	Devonport United (3)	–	
1934	Richmond Rovers (1)	–	Richmond Rovers (4)	Richmond Rovers (1)	–	
1935	Richmond Rovers (2)	–	Newton Rangers (3)	Richmond Rovers (2)	–	
1936	Manukau (1)	–	Manukau (1)	Richmond Rovers (3)	–	
1937	Richmond Rovers (3)	–	Marist Old Boys (4)	Marist Old Boys (4)	–	
1938	Marist Old Boys (3)	–	Richmond Rovers (5)	Richmond Rovers (4)	–	
1939	Mt Albert United (1)	–	Marist Old Boys (5)	Mt Albert United (1)	–	
1940	Richmond Rovers (4)	North Shore Albions (1)	Richmond Rovers (6)	North Shore Albions (4)	–	
1941	North Shore Albions (6)	North Shore Albions (2)	Manukau (2)	Manukau (1)	–	
1942	Manukau (2)	City-Otahuhu (merged side) (1)	Richmond Rovers (7)	Manukau (2)	–	
1943	Manukau (3)	Manukau (1)	Manukau (3)	Manukau (2)	–	
1944	City Rovers (8)	City Rovers (2)	Ponsonby United (6)	City Rovers (1)	–	
1945	Otahuhu Rovers (1)	Otahuhu Rovers (2)	North Shore Albions (2)	North Shore Albions (5)	–	
1946	Richmond (5)	North Shore Albions (3)	Marist Old Boys (6)	Richmond Rovers (5)	–	
1947	Mt Albert United (2)	Marist Old Boys (1) & Richmond Rovers (1)	Mount Albert United (1)	Mount Albert United (2)	–	
1948	Marist Brothers (4)	Marist Brothers (2) & Richmond (2)	Mount Albert (2)	Mount Albert (3)	–	
1949	Richmond Rovers (6)	Richmond Rovers (3)	Richmond Rovers (8)	Richmond Rovers (6)	–	
1950	Mount Albert United (3)	Mount Albert United (1)	Mount Albert United (3)	Marist Old Boys (5)	–	
1951	Richmond Rovers (7) & Mount Albert Lions (4)	Mount Albert United (2) & Richmond Rovers (4)	Point Chevalier Pirates (1)	Point Chevalier Pirates (1)	–	
1952	Ponsonby United (7)	Ponsonby United (1)	Ponsonby United (7)	Ponsonby United (3)	–	
1953	Pt Chevalier (1)	Mt Albert (3)	Ponsonby United (8)	not played	–	
1954	Ponsonby (8)	Ponsonby (2) & Mt Albert (4)	North Shore Albions (3)	North Shore Albions (6)	–	
1955	Richmond (8)	Richmond (5) & North Shore Albions (4)	Ellerslie United (1)	Ellerslie United (2)	–	
1956	Richmond (9)	Richmond Rovers (6) & Point Chevalier	Ellerslie United (2)	Richmond Rovers (7)	–	
1957	Ellerslie United (1)	Ellerslie United (1) & City Newton Dragons (1)	Otahuhu Rovers (1)	not played	–	
1958	Ponsonby United (9)	Ponsonby United (3)	Marist Old Boys (7)	Marist Old Boys (6)	–	
1959	Western United (1)	Western United (1)	Ellerslie United (3)	Ellerslie United (3)	–	
1960	Eastern United (1) & Southern Districts (1)	Eastern United (1)	Glenora (1)	Eastern United (1) & Glenora (1)	–	
1961	Eastern United (2)	Eastern United (2)	Eastern United (1)	Eastern United (2)	–	
1962	Eastern United (3) & Glenora (1)	Eastern United (3)	Eastern United	Glenora	–	
1963	Eastern United (4)	Southern Districts (1)	Eastern United	Eastern United	–	
1964	Otahuhu (2)	Otahuhu (3)	Mt Albert	Mt Albert	–	
1965	Marist Brothers (5)	Ponsonby (4)	Otahuhu	Marist Brothers & Otahuhu	–	
1966	Marist Brothers (6)	Otahuhu (4)	Marist Brothers	Marist Brothers	–	
1967	Ponsonby (10)	Ponsonby (5)	Otahuhu	Ponsonby	–	
1968	Mt Albert (5)	Ponsonby (6)	Ellerslie	Ellerslie	–	
1969	Mt Albert (6)	Otahuhu (5)	Richmond	Mt Albert	Otahuhu	
1970	Otahuhu (3)	Mt Albert (5)	Otahuhu	Mt Albert	Mt Albert	
1971	Otahuhu (4)	Otahuhu (6)	Marist Brothers	Otahuhu	Otahuhu	
1972	Ponsonby (11)	Ellerslie (2)	Ponsonby	Ponsonby	Otahuhu	
1973	Ponsonby (12)	Ponsonby (7)	Mt Wellington Warriors	Ponsonby	Otahuhu	
1974	Ellerslie (2)	Ellerslie (3)	Otahuhu	Ellerslie	Mt Wellington Warriors & Ponsonby	
1975	Otahuhu (5)	Otahuhu (7)	Otahuhu	Otahuhu	Northcote	
1976	Mt Wellington Warriors (1)	Mt Wellington Warriors (1)	Richmond	Richmond	Glenora	
1977	Otahuhu (6)	Otahuhu (8)	Otahuhu	Otahuhu	Otahuhu	
1978	Otahuhu (7)	Otahuhu (9)	Glenora	Otahuhu	Otahuhu	
1979	Richmond (10)	Otahuhu (10)	Manukau	Richmond	Otahuhu	
1980	Richmond (11)	Richmond (7)	Manukau	Manukau & Richmond	Richmond	
1981	Mt Albert (7)	Mt Albert (6)	Otahuhu	Mt Albert	Mt Albert	
1982	Mt Albert (8)	Glenora (1)	Otahuhu	Otahuhu	Otahuhu	
1983	Otahuhu (8)	Mt Albert (7)	Manukau	Manukau	Otahuhu	
1984	Mt Albert (9)	Otahuhu (11)	Mt Albert	Otahuhu & Manukau	Otahuhu	
1985	Mt Albert (10)	Manukau (2)	Manukau	Mt Albert	Manukau	
1986	Mt Albert (11)	Te Atatu (1)	Manukau	Manukau	Te Atatu	
1987	Northcote (1)	Mangere East (1)	Otahuhu	Mt Albert	Otahuhu	
1988	Te Atatu (1)	Glenora (2)	Northcote	Otahuhu	Te Atatu	
1989	Northcote (2)	Northcote (1)	Mangere East	Northcote	Otahuhu	
1990	Otahuhu (9)	Northcote (2)	Richmond	Northcote	Northcote	
1991	Northcote (3)	Northcote (3)	Northcote	Northcote	Northcote	
1992	Northcote (4)	Mt Albert (8)	Northcote	Northcote	Northcote	
1993	Northcote (5)	Northcote (4)	Northcote	Mt Albert	Northcote	
1994	Northcote (6)	Otahuhu (12)	Otahuhu	Otahuhu	Northcote	
1995	Otahuhu (10)	City-Pt Chevalier (1)	not played	Otahuhu	Otahuhu	
1996	Otara (1)	Otahuhu (13)	Manurewa	Otahuhu	Otahuhu	
1997	Glenora (2)	Mangere East (2)	Marist Brothers	Otara	Otahuhu	
1998	Glenora (3)	Glenora (3)	Mangere East	not played	–	
1999	Glenora (4)	Glenora (4)	Glenora	not played	–	
2000	Otahuhu (11)	Richmond (8)	not played	not played	Otahuhu	
2001	Northcote (7)	Richmond (9)	not played	not played	–	
2002	Hibiscus Coast (1)	Papakura (1)	Hibiscus Coast	not played	–	
2003	Mangere East (1)	Mangere East (3)	Hibiscus Coast	not played	–	
2004	Mt Albert (12)	Mangere East (4)	Ellerslie	not played	–	
2005	Manurewa (1)	Papakura (2)	Mt Albert	not played	–	
2006	Mt Albert (13)	Mt Albert (9)	Mt Albert, Te Atatu, Richmond, East Coast Bays(*)	Mangere East	Mt Albert	
2007	Manurewa (2)	Papakura (3)	Papakura(*)	Richmond		
2008	Mt Albert (14)	Otahuhu (14)	Mt Albert	Richmond	Richmond	
2009	Mt Albert (15)	Otahuhu (15)	Mt Albert, Northcote, Otahuhu(*)	Otahuhu	–	
2010	Otahuhu (12)	Otahuhu (16)	Otahuhu (*)	Otahuhu	Mt Albert	
2011	Howick (1)	Howick (1)	Otahuhu (*)	Glenora	Mt Albert	
2012	Mt Albert (16)	Mt Albert (10)	Howick (*)	Otahuhu		
2013	Pt Chevalier (2)	Pt Chevalier (1)	Mt Albert (*)	Howick	Mt Albert	Otara
2014	Pt Chevalier (3)	Pt Chevalier (2)	Pt Chevalier (*)	Pt Chevalier	Pt Chevalier	
2015	Pt Chevalier (4)	Mt Albert (11)	Pt Chevalier	Pt Chevalier, Mt Albert (shared after a 14–14 draw)	Mt Albert	New Lynn Stags
2016	Papakura (1)	Papakura (4)	Papakura	Pt Chevalier	Mt Albert	
2017	Glenora (5)	Pt Chevalier (3)	Pt Chevalier, Glenora	Pt Chevalier	Pt Chevalier	Northcote
2018	Pt Chevalier (5)	Glenora (5)	Glenora, Pt Chevalier	Pt Chevalier	Glenora	Mangere East
2019	Howick (2)	Howick (2)	Mt Albert, Howick	Glenora		
2020	Not Awarded	Not Awarded	Mt Albert	Mt Albert	Not Awarded	
2021	Not Awarded	Pt Chevalier (4)	Glenora, Pt Chevalier	Pt Chevalier	Not Awarded	
2022	Pt Chevalier (6)	Pt Chevalier (5), Glenora (6)	Pt Chevalier	Pt Chevalier		
2023	Pt Chevalier (7)	Richmond Rovers (8)	Pt Chevalier	Pt Chevalier	Pt Chevalier	
2024	Richmond (12)	Richmond (11)	Te Atatu	Richmond (13)	Richmond	
2025	Otahuhu (13)	Otahuhu (17)	Te Atatu, Ponsonby, Mt Albert, Otahuhu	Papakura (2)	Otahuhu	Mt Albert
2026	Otahuhu (14)	Otahuhu (18)	Otahuhu	Otahuhu	Otahuhu	Otahuhu
Year	Fox Memorial	Rukutai Shield	Roope Rooster	Stormont Shield	Kiwi Shield	Club of the Year

==== Total Fox Memorial First Grade Titles (includes Myers Cup and Monteith Shield) ====
- 16: Mt Albert
- 14: Otahuhu *includes City-Otahuhu side of 1942
- 12: Ponsonby, Richmond
- 9: City Rovers *includes City-Otahuhu side of 1942
- 7: Northcote, Pt Chevalier
- 6: North Shore Albions/Devonport United, Marist
- 5: Glenora
- 4: Eastern United
- 3: Manukau
- 2: Newton Rangers, Ellerslie, Howick, Western United, Manurewa
- 1: Grafton Athletic, Maritime, Mt Wellington, Te Atatu, Otara, Mangere East, Hibiscus Coast, and Papakura.

==== Roope Rooster ====
Year	Holders
2018	Glenora (28-20 v Point Chevalier)
2019	Mt Albert Lions, Howick Hornets
2020	Point Chevalier Pirates
2021	Glenora, Point Chevalier Pirates (20-? v Glenora)
2022	Point Chevalier Pirates (4 successful defenses)
2023	Point Chevalier Pirates (5 successful defenses)
2024	Point Chevalier Pirates (3 successful defenses), Te Atatu Roosters (26-22 v Point Chevalier)

=== Premier two and three titles ===
- The Sharman Cup has been awarded to the Premier 2 Championship winners in recent years; however, originally it was awarded to the Premier 2 Minor Championship winners. It was gifted to Auckland Rugby League in October 1934 by Mr. Sharman of George Court and Sons. He was moving from New Zealand to live in England and wished to leave a happy memory behind of his involvement in Auckland rugby league.
- The Lawson Cup was awarded to the Premier 2 Major Champions, and in essence it has been replaced by the Sharman Cup.
- The Norton Cup was originally awarded to the Senior B Grade (second division) champions however in 1931 it was awarded to the reserve grade winners which superseded the second division for a period of time.
- The Phelan Shield has been awarded to the Premier 3 Major Champions. The Phelan Shield replaced the ARL Trophy (first awarded in 1989); however, from 2015 it was awarded to the Premier 2 Minor Champion as the competition reverted to a two-division structure. It was donated to the league in 1934 by Ted Phelan and was won in its inaugural season by Newton Rangers. At this point it was competed for by teams who were eliminated from the Roope Rooster in the first round.

Year	Sharman Cup	Lawson Cup	Norton Cup	Phelan Shield/ARL Trophy	Stallard Cup
1925	–	–	Ellerslie United (1)	–	Otahuhu Rovers (1)
1926	–	–	Northcote & Birkenhead Ramblers (1)	–	Kingsland Rovers(1)
1927	–	–	Ellerslie United (2)	–	Ellerslie United (1)
1928	–	–	Grafton Athletic (Maritime) (1)	–	–
1929	–	–	Point Chevalier (1)	–	–
1930	–	–	Otahuhu Rovers (1)	–	–
1931	–	–	Devonport United (1)	–	–
1932	–	–	Richmond Rovers (1)	–	–
1933	–	–	Richmond Rovers (2)	–	–
1934	–	–	Richmond Bulldogs (3)	Newton Rangers (1)	–
1935	Otahuhu Rovers (1)	–	Marist Old Boys (1)	Ponsonby United (1)	Marist Old Boys (1)
1936	Papakura (1)	–	Mount Albert United (1)	Ponsonby United (2)	Marist Old Boys (2)
1937	Papakura (2)	–	Richmond Rovers (4)	North Shore Albions (1)	Marist Old Boys (3)
1938	Otahuhu Rovers (2)	–	Richmond Rovers (5)	Manukau (1)	Richmond Rovers (1)
1939	Otahuhu Rovers (3)	–	Richmond Rovers (6)	City Rovers (1)	Richmond Rovers (2)
1940	Otahuhu Rovers (4)	–	Richmond Rovers (7)	Manukau (2)	–
1941	Otahuhu Rovers (5)	–	Not Played (due to war)	Mount Albert United (1)	–
1942	No Competition	–	No Competition	No Competition	–
1943	Not Awarded	–	Not Awarded	Mount Albert United (2)	–
1944	Not Awarded	–	Not Awarded	No Competition	–
1945	Not Awarded	–	Not Awarded	Ponsonby United (3)	–
1946	Not Awarded	–	Not Awarded	–	
1947	Not Awarded	–	Not Awarded	–	
1948	Newton (1)	–	Not Awarded	Richmond Rovers (1)	
1949	Ellerslie (1)	–	Ponsonby	–	
1950	Otahuhu (6)	–	Mt Albert	–	
1951	Pt Chevalier (1)	–	Not Awarded	–	
1952	Pt Chevalier (2)	–	Not Awarded	–	
1953	Richmond (1)	–	Not Awarded	–	
1954	Not Awarded	–	Not Awarded	–	
1955	Not Awarded	–	Not Awarded	–	
1956	Not Awarded	–	Not Awarded	City Newton	
1957	Not Awarded	–	Not Awarded	–	
1958	Not Awarded	–	Not Awarded	–	
1959	Not Awarded	–	Not Awarded	–	
1960	Not Awarded	–	Not Awarded	–	
1961	Not Awarded	–	Not Awarded	–	
1962	Not Awarded	–	Not Awarded	–	
1963	Not Awarded	–	Not Awarded	–	
1964	Not Awarded	–	Not Awarded	Marist	
1965	Southern (1)	–	Not Awarded	–	
1966	City Newton (1)	–	Not Awarded	–	
1967	Southern (2)	–	Not Awarded	–	
1968	Mt Wellington (1)	–	Not Awarded	–	
1969	City Newton (2)	–	Mangere East		
1970	Te Atatu (1) & Pt Chevalier (1)	–	Northcote	University	
1971	Glenora (1)	–	Marist & Pakuranga	–	
1972	Richmond (2)	–	Mt Roskill	–	
1973	Te Atatu (2)	–	North Shore	–	
1974	Te Atatu (3)	–	Maritime & City Newton	–	
1975	Mangere East (1)	–	Pt Chevalier	–	
1976	Te Atatu (4)	–	City Newton	–	
1977	Manukau (1)	–	Glenfield	–	
1978	Te Atatu (5)	–	Pt Chevalier	–	
1979	Northcote (1)	–	Glenora Corona	–	
1980	Mt Albert (1)	–	Otara	–	
1981	Ellerslie (1)	–	Richmond	–	
1982	Mangere East (2)	–	Glenora	–	
1983	Richmond (3)	–	Glenora/Kelston	–	
1984	City Newton (3)	City Newton	Richmond	–	
1985	Glenora (2)	Glenora	Richmond	–	
1986	Ellerslie (2)	Ellerslie	Richmond	–	
1987	City-Pt Chevalier (1)	City-Pt Chevalier	Mt Albert & Richmond	–	
1988	City-Pt Chevalier (2)	Otara	Otahuhu Blue	–	
1989	City-Pt Chevalier (3)	Otara	Mt Wellington	Mt Wellington	
1990	Ponsonby (1)	City-Pt Chevalier	North Shore	Glenfield	
1991	Ellerslie (4)	Ellerslie	North Shore	Waitemata	
1992	Marist (1)	Ellerslie	Glenfield	Glenfield	
1993	Marist Saints (2)	–	–	Glenfield Greyhounds	
1994	–	–	–	–	
1995	Manurewa Marlins (1)	–	–	–	
1996	Glenora (3)	–	–	–	
1997	Richmond (4)	–	–	–	
1998	Hibiscus Coast (1)	–	–	Mt Albert	
1999	Mt Albert	–	–	–	
2000	Ponsonby	Ponsonby	Mt Albert	Mt Albert	
2001	Hibiscus Coast (2)	Hibiscus Coast	Mangere East	Mangere East	
2002	Ellerslie	–	Mt Wellington	–	
2003	Northcote (2)	–	–	East Coast Bays	
2004	Manukau (2)	–	–	–	
2005	Howick	–	–	–	
2006	Manurewa	–	–	Hibiscus Coast	
2007	Northcote (3)	–	–	Ponsonby	
2008	Richmond (5)	–	–	New Lynn	
2009	Howick	Howick	Manukau	Manukau	
2010	East Coast Bays	–	Pt Chevalier	Pt Chevalier	
2011	Pt Chevalier	–	–	New Lynn	
2012	Mangere East	Papatoetoe	–	Hibiscus Coast	
2013	Richmond (6)	Otara	–	Mt Wellington	
2014	Ōtara (1)	–	–	Mt Wellington	
2015	Richmond (7)	–	–	Te Atatu	
2016	Te Atatu (6)	–	–	Te Atatu	
2017	Otahuhu (7)	–	–	Otahuhu	
2018	Bay Roskill	–	–	Bay Roskill	
2019	-	–	–	-	
2020	Not Awarded	Not Awarded	Not Awarded	Not Awarded	
2021	Waitemata Seagulls (1)	–	–	Manukau Magpies	
2022	Northcote (4)	–	–	–	
2023	Ōtara (2)	–	–	–	
2024	Northcote (5)	–	–	–	
2025	Otara (3)	–	–	Hibiscus Coast	
2026	Hibiscus Coast (3)	–	–	Richmond	

=== Explanation of player trophies ===
- The Fox Memorial Player of the Year is awarded to the player who accrues the most votes from coaches voting for the best player in their team and the opposing team.
- The Lipscombe Cup is awarded to the Premier One sportsman of the year, chosen by the Senior Management Committee, from nominations received from Premier clubs.
- The Rothville Trophy is awarded to the Premier One player of the year, selected by the Auckland Coach.
- The Bert Humphries Memorial is awarded to the most improved forward and back in Premier One and is selected by the Auckland coach/selector.
- The Tetley Trophy is awarded to the Premier One player scoring the most tries during the Rukutai Shield competition.
- The Lance Painter Rose Bowl is awarded to the Premier One player kicking the most goals during the Rukutai Shield competition. It was donated by Lance Painter in June, 1944 to be awarded for place kicking.
- The Hyland Memorial Cup is awarded to the most outstanding Premier/Senior Coach selected by the Senior Management Committee.
- The Doug Price Memorial Medal is awarded to the player of the day in the Premier One Grand Final and is selected by a sub committee appointed by the board of directors.

=== Player trophies by year in the Premier grade ===
Year	Fox Memorial Player of the Year	J.F.W. Dickson Medal/Lipscombe Cup (Sportsman)	Rothville Trophy (Player of the Year)	Bert Humphries Memorial (Most Improved Forward)	Bert Humphries Memorial (Most Improved Back)	Tetley Trophy (now named Masters Rugby League Cup) (Top Try Scorer)	Lance Painter Rose Bowl (Top Goal Kicker)	Hyland Memorial Cup (Coach of the Year)	Doug Price Memorial Medal (Grand Final POTD)	Women's Player of the Year
1935		none		none	none	none	Robert Morrissey (Mt Albert)	none	none	
1937		Wally Tittleton (Richmond)		none	none	none	none	none	none	
1938		Claude Dempsey (Newton)		none	none	none	none	none	none	
1941		George Mitchell (Richmond)		none	none	none	none	none	none	
1942		Owen Hughes (City Rovers)		none	none	none	none	none	none	
1943		M. Ryan (Pt Chevalier) (Junior club)		none	none	none	none	none	none	
1944		Horace Hunt (North Shore)		none	none	none	Colin Riley (Otahuhu)	none	none	
1945		Jim Fogarty (Otahuhu) & V. Fredatovich (City 3rd Grade)		none	none	none	Colin Riley (Otahuhu)	none	none	
1960		none	Ron Ackland (Eastern)	none	none	none	none	none	none	
1961		none	Ron Ackland (Eastern)	none	none	none	none	none	none	
1962		none	Brian Reidy (Marist)	none	none	none	none	none	none	
1963		none	Ray Sinel (Eastern)	none	none	none	none	none	none	
1964		Neville White (Richmond)	Don Hammond (Eastern)	none	none	none	none	none	none	
1965		Tony Kriletich (Marist)	Bill Harford (Marist)	none	none	none	none	none	none	
1966		Roy Christian (Otahuhu)	Bruce Castle (Ellerslie)	none	none	none	B Gascoigne (Marist)	none	none	
1967		Doug Ellwood (City Newton)	Doug Ellwood (City Newton)	none	none	Robert Mincham (Glenora)	Ernie Wiggs (Otahuhu)	none	none	
1968		John Young (Ellerslie)	Tony Kriletich (Marist)	none	none	none	Ernie Wiggs (Otahuhu)	none	none	
1969		Gary Woollard (Mt Albert)	Eric Carson (Glenora)	none	none	none	Ernie Wiggs (Otahuhu)	none	none	
1970		Ray Williams (Richmond)	Tony Kriletich (Marist)	none	none	Mike McClennan (Ponsonby)	Ernie Wiggs (Otahuhu)	Simon Yates (Otahuhu)	none	
1971		Eddie Wulf (Marist)	Ken Stirling (Ellerslie)	Eddie Heatley (Otahuhu)	Ken Stirling (Ellerslie)	Paul Matete (Otahuhu)	Brian Tracey (Ponsonby)	Morrie Robertson (Ellerslie)	none	
1972		Bill Harford (Te Atatu)	Murray Eade (Ellerslie)	Peter Gurnick (Otahuhu)	Len Hall (Ellerslie)	Len Hall (Ellerslie)	Bruce Rowe (Ellerslie)	Don Mann (Ponsonby)	none	
1973		Tom Conroy (Ponsonby)	Don Mann (Ponsonby)	Lyndsay Proctor (Ellerslie)	Dave Sorensen (Mt Wellington)	Ashley McEwen (Mt Albert)	Ernie Wiggs (Mt Albert)	Roger Bailey (Ponsonby)	none	
1974		Bruce Rowe (Ellerslie)	Graham Smith (Ellerslie)	Tom Conroy (Ponsonby)	Bob Jarvis (Otahuhu)	Colin Wells (Ponsonby)	Bruce Rowe (Ellerslie)	Morrie Robertson (Ellerslie)	none	
1975		Shane Dowsett (Otahuhu)	Dane Sorensen (Mt Wellington)	Tom Conroy (Ponsonby)	Fred Ah Kuoi (Richmond)	Mark Graham (Otahuhu)	John Wilson (Northcote)	Joe Gwynne (Otahuhu)	none	
1976		Dane Sorensen (Mt Wellington)	Kurt Sorensen (Mt Wellington)	Murray Netzler (Ellerslie)	Gary Kemble (Ellerslie)	Gus Fepuleai (Richmond)	Joe Karam (Glenora)	Ron Ackland (Mt Wellington)	none	
1977		John Wilson (Northcote)	Denis Williams (Te Atatu)	Lyndsay Proctor (Ellerslie)	Olsen Filipaina (Mangere East)	Nick Wright (Otahuhu)	Joe Karam (Glenora)	Graham Lowe (Otahuhu)	none	
1978		Gene Swann (Marist)	Olsen Filipaina (Mangere East)	Owen Wright (Otahuhu)	Warwick Freeman (Glenora)	Brian Campbell (Richmond)	Phil Dryland (Richmond)	Graham Lowe (Otahuhu)	none	
1979	Wayne Robertson Te Atatu Roosters	Paul Bridges (Mt Albert)	Fred Ah Kuoi (Richmond)	Alan McCarthy (Ponsonby Mar.)	James Leuluai (Mt Wellington)	Olsen Filipaina (Mangere East)	Olsen Filipaina (Mangere East)	Joe Gwynne (Richmond)	none	
1980	Darryl Morrison Otahuhu Leopards	James Leuluai (Mt Wellington)	Stan Martin (Richmond)	Gary Evans (Manukau)	Stephen Craike (Ellerslie)	David Kerr (Mt Wellington)	Denis Williams (Te Atatu)	Mike McClennan (Mt Albert)	none	
1981	Mark Tavai Mt Albert Lions	John Ackland (Mt Albert)	Ron O'Regan (City Newton)	Kevin Schaumkel (Glenora)	Marcus Pouesi (Mt Albert)	Emil Vaafusuaga (Otahuhu) & Dean Bell (Manukau)	Denis Williams (Glenora)	Mike McClennan (Mt Albert)	none	
1982	Paul Bridges City Newton	Hugh McGahan (Otahuhu)	Owen Wright (Otahuhu)	Hugh McGahan (Otahuhu)	Clayton Friend (Manukau)	Fred Muller (Otahuhu)	Billy Kem (Glenora)	Ian Gorden (Otahuhu)	none	
1983	Owen Wright Otahuhu Leopards	Darryl Morrison (Otahuhu)	Ron O'Regan (City Newton)	John Ackland (Mt Albert)	Joe Ropati (Otahuhu)	Paul Sorich (Ellerslie)	Phil Harrison (Northcote)	Ian Gorden (Otahuhu)	none	
1984	Dave Seifuiva Richmond Bulldogs	Owen Wright (Otahuhu)	Owen Wright (Otahuhu)	Verne Wilson (Manukau)	Clayton Friend (Manukau)	Uiti Tui (Otahuhu)	Cedric Lovett (Mt Albert)	Mike McClennan (Mt Albert) & Brian Tracey (Te Atatu)	none	
1985	Dean Lonergan City Newton	Mike Patton (Mangere East)	Shane Cooper (Mt Albert)	James Goulding (Richmond)	Kelly Shelford (Manukau)	Joe Ropati (Otahuhu)	Kevin Hughes (Te Atatu)	Cameron Bell (Manukau)	none	
1986	Terry O'Shea Te Atatu Roosters	George Mann (Mangere East)	Patrick "Paddy" Burgoyne (Glenora)	Dean Lonergan (City Newton)	David Watson (Manukau)	Shane Horo (Te Atatu)	Kevin Teague (City Newton)	Brian Tracey (Te Atatu)	none	
1987	Neville Ramsay Manukau Magpies	Mike Patton (Glenora)	Gary Freeman (Northcote)	Rene Nordmeyer (Mangere East)	Kevin Iro (Mt Albert)	Iva Ropati (Otahuhu), Gary Freeman (Northcote) & Peter Fue (Northcote)	Dean Birch (Northcote)	Wally Green (Mangere East)	none	
1988	Arthur Clark Otahuhu Leopards	Brett Ward (Mangere East)	Shane Hansen (Northcote)	Se'e Solomona (Richmond)	Dean Birch (Northcote)	Kelly Shelford (Glenora)	Phil Bancroft (Glenora)	Ron O'Regan (Te Atatu)	none	
1989	Tawera Nikau Otahuhu Leopards	Dave Townsend (Mangere East)	Kelly Shelford (Glenora)	Jason Lowrie (Northcote)	Stu Galbraith (Northcote)	Dave Townsend (Mangere East)	Phil Bancroft (Glenora)	Neville Ramsey (Manukau)	none	
1990	Mark Riley Otahuhu Leopards	Iva Ropati (Mangere East)	Tawera Nikau (Otahuhu)	Tamie Tagaloa (Te Atatu)	Stu Galbraith (Northcote)	Iva Ropati (Mangere East)	Phil Bancroft (Glenora)	Russell Cole (Glenora)	none	
1991	Aaron Palelei Otahuhu Leopards	Brian Laumatia (Mangere East)	Se'e Solomona (Glenora)	Phil Robards (Te Atatu)	Logan Campbell (Northcote)	Logan Campbell (Northcote)	Dave McIntosh (Northcote)	Dominic Clark (Mt Albert)	Stu Galbraith (Northcote)	
1992	Tony Botica City-Point Chevalier	Eric McAllistar (Glenora)	Mike Patton (Glenora)	Jason Lowrie (Northcote)	Mike Kini (Te Atatu)	Vae Afoa (Northcote) & Richard Barnett (Otahuhu)	Wayne Trainor (Mt Albert)	Graeme Norton (Northcote)	Fred Sapatu (Mt Albert)	
1993	Roy Tusa Mangere East		Francis Leota (Otahuhu)							
1994	Sean Wilson Northcote	Leroy Joe Otahuhu Leopards					Mark Elder (Otahuhu)			
1995	Junior Pumipi Otara Scorpions	Karl Taylor Te Atatu Roosters	Gavin Welsh (Otahuhu)		Gavin Welsh (Otahuhu)	Lamond Copestake (20, Northcote)	Lawrence Tagaloa (75, City-Pt Chev)	Trevor McLeod (Otahuhu)	Gavin Welsh (Otahuhu)	
1996	Jason Arama Manurewa Marlins	Peter Feau (Otahuhu)	Matthew Sturm (Glenora)	Milton Ross (Ellerslie)	Lionel Periera (Manurewa)			Ronald Kite Otara Scorpions		
1997	Tukere Barlow Mangere East Hawks					Hare Te Rangi (Otahuhu)				
1998	Fred Robarts Te Atatu Roosters	Fred Robarts Te Atatu Roosters								
1999	Fred Robarts Te Atatu Roosters	Shane Edwards (?)				Richard Barnett (Otahuhu)			Ben Valeni (Glenora)	
2000	Daniel Vasau Richmond Bulldogs								Paul Teniseli (Otahuhu)	
2001	John Teina Manukau Magpies		Taetafa Taua'a Richmond Bulldogs	Taetafa Taua'a Richmond Bulldogs						
2002	Willie Bishop Hibiscus Coast Raiders	Shane Dance (Otahuhu)	Junior Asiata (Otahuhu)	Junior Asiata – Forward (Otahuhu)	Willie Bishop – Back (Hibiscus Coast)	Willie Bishop (Hibiscus Coast)				
2003	Corey Wetini Ellerslie Eagles									
2004	Clayton Rogers Papakura Sea Eagles									
2005	Eliakim Fononga Mangere East									
2006	Darren Himiona Northcote Tigers			TJ Aoese (Mt Albert)	Simon Ieremia (Mt Albert)				Fale Talaepa Mt Albert Lions	
2007	Eddie Leavai Marist Saints		Francis Leger Richmond Bulldogs						Victor Field	
2008	Suaia Matagi Te Atatu Roosters									
2009			Phillip Kahui (Mt Albert)					Brent Gemmell (Mt Albert)		
2010			James Blackwell (Otahuhu)		James Blackwell (Otahuhu)	Nickolas Lythgo (Marist)		Richie Blackmore (Otahuhu)		
2011			Jeremiah Pai (Northcote)		Rusty Bristow (Papakura)	William Stowers (Papakura)	Lee Weatherill (Howick)	Tony Tuia (Howick)		
2012			Ralph Ah Van (Mt Albert)			Simon Ieremia (Marist)		Brendan Douglas (Glenora)		
2013			Zebastian Luisi (Pt Chevalier)		James Blackwell (Mt Albert)	James Blackwell (Mt Albert)	Cody Walker (Mt Albert)			
2014			Dion Snell (Howick)				Grant Pocklington (Pt Chevalier)			
2015			Raymond Talimalie (Mangere East)			Dillon Rota (Mt Albert)	Jonathan Carl (Pt Chevalier)	Steve Buckingham (Mt Albert)		Georgia Hale (Richmond)
2016			Zacharia Tippins (Glenora)			Saula Solomona (Pt Chevalier)	Jonathan Carl (Pt Chevalier)	Richie Blackmore (Papakura)	Terence Phillips (Papakura)	
2017			Taylor Daniels (Northcote) & Dylan Moses (Pt Chevalier)			Saula Solomona (Pt Chevalier)	Drew Radich (Howick)	Bernie Perenara (Glenora)		Krystal Rota (Manurewa)
2018			Phoenix Hunt (Papakura)			James Waterson (Northcote)	Drew Radich (Howick)	Bernie Perenara (Glenora)		Alice Vailea (Richmond)
2019	Wyatt Rangi (Glenora)									Mele Toki (Ponsonby)
2020									No grand final	
2021	Jethro Friend (Howick Hornets)					Patrick Sipley (Point Chevalier)	Francis Leger (Point Chevalier)	Sefo Fuimaono (Point Chevalier)	No grand final	
2022									Brody Tamarua (Point Chevalier)	
2023	Sione Feao (Ōtāhuhu)								Ollie Tuimavave (Pt Chevalier)	Lavinia Tauhalaliku (City)
2024	Fine Vakautakakala (Te Atatu)							Henri Nicholas (Richmond)	Beau Cordtz (Richmond)	
2025	Joshua Tanielu (Bay Roskill)		Joshua Tanielu (Bay Roskill)			Kahn Munokoa (Manukau), Andrew Nansen (Otahuhu), & Toaiti Ramsay (Otahuhu)	William Fakatoumafi (Otahuhu)	Tusa Lafaele (Otahuhu)	Sebastine Ikahihifo (Otahuhu)	Onjeurlina Hunt (Otahuhu)
2026	Dylan Tavita (Otahuhu)					Kahn Munokoa (Manukau), and Toaiti Ramsay (Otahuhu)	James Dowie (Otahuhu)	Tusa Lafaele (Otahuhu)	Viliami Tahitu'a (Otahuhu)	Onjeurlina Hunt (Otahuhu)
Year	Lion Red Fox Memorial Player of the Year	Lipscombe Cup (Sportsman)	Rothville Trophy (Player of the Year)	Bert Humphries Memorial (Most Improved Forward)	Bert Humphries Memorial (Most Improved Back)	Tetley Trophy (now named Masters Rugby League Cup) (Top Try Scorer)	Lance Painter Rose Bowl (Top Goal Kicker)	Hyland Memorial Cup (Coach of the Year)	Doug Price Memorial Medal (Grand Final POTD)	Women's Player of the Year

== See also ==
- Rugby league in New Zealand
