= Fred Robarts =

Fiji international rugby league footballer

Freddie Robarts
Personal information
- Born: 1972 or 1973 (age 52–53) Fiji

Playing information
- Position: Hooker, Prop, Second-row
Club
Years	Team	Pld	T	G	FG	P
1996	Te Atatu Roosters
1994–95	Waitakere City Raiders	15	2	0	0	8
	Total	15	2	0	0	8
Representative
Years	Team	Pld	T	G	FG	P
	Auckland
2000	Fiji	3	0	0	0	0

Freddie Robarts is a Fijian former professional rugby league footballer who represented Fiji in the 2000 World Cup.

== Playing career ==
A Bay Roskill Vikings junior, Robarts played for the Te Atatu Roosters in the Auckland Rugby League competition. In 1992 he represented an Auckland-based Pacific XIII that beat the New Zealand Māori rugby league team 46–42.

Along with his brother Phil, played for the Waitakere City Raiders in the Lion Red Cup between 1994 and 1995.

He won the ARL's best and fairest award in 1998 and 1999 representing Te Atatu Roosters, becoming the only player ever to win the award in back to back seasons. He also won the Lipscombe Cup for sportsman of the year in 1999. Robarts also played for Auckland.

In 2000 Robarts represented Fiji at the Millennium World Cup, playing in all three of Fiji's matches.
