= Kelly Shelford =

New Zealand international rugby league footballer & coach

Personal information
- Born: 4 May 1966 (age 60) New Zealand

Playing information
- Position: Stand-off
Club
Years	Team	Pld	T	G	FG	P
19??–8?	Manukau Magpies
198?–90	Glenora Bears
1991–??	Otahuhu Leopards
1987–89	Whitehaven	17	8	0	0	32
1991–97	Warrington	174	42	1	8	178
	Total	191	50	1	8	210
Representative
Years	Team	Pld	T	G	FG	P
1985–89	Auckland	3	2	5	0	18
1986–97	New Zealand Māori
1989–91	New Zealand	10	5	6	0	32

Kelly Shelford (born 4 May 1966) is a New Zealand rugby league player who represented New Zealand, including in Test matches that counted towards the 1992 World Cup.

== Playing career ==
Shelford was a Manukau Magpies junior and played for the club in the Auckland Rugby League competition. In 1985 he won the Bert Humphries Memorial award as the most improved back in the competition.

Shelford then switched clubs, joining the Glenora Bears. In 1988 he won the Tetley Trophy as the top try scorer in the competition and in 1989 he won the Rothville Trophy as the player of the year.

In 1991 Shelford joined the Otahuhu Leopards. Shelford was also an Auckland representative and played for the New Zealand Māori side between 1986 and 1997.

During the 1980s Shelford also played for the Whitehaven in England, where he played only a small number of games, then left with no explanation.

Between 1989 and 1991 Shelford was a New Zealand national rugby league team representative, playing in ten Test matches.

In 1991 Shelford joined the Warrington Wolves. Kelly Shelford played loose forward in Warrington's 10-40 defeat by Wigan in the 1994–95 Regal Trophy Final during the 1994–95 season at Alfred McAlpine Stadium, Huddersfield on Saturday 28 January 1995. He stayed with the club until the 1997 season, when he left midway through the season.

After leaving Warrington, Shelford returned home and joined the Waikato Cougars in the National Provincial Competition.

In 1998 Shelford served as the player-coach for Hukanui in the Waikato Rugby League. In 1999 he switched to cross town rivals, the Hamilton City Tigers.

== Coaching career ==
Shelford coached the Papakura Sea Eagles in the Auckland Rugby League competition in 2002 and in 2003 Shelford coached the Manurewa Marlins in the Bartercard Cup.
