= Willie Bishop =

NZ international rugby league & union player

Personal information
- Born: New Zealand

Playing information
Club
Years	Team	Pld	T	G	FG	P
2003	New Zealand Warriors
2004	Sydney Roosters
2006	Manly Sea Eagles
2007	Belrose Eagles
	Total	0	0	0	0	0

Rugby union career
Senior career
Years	Team	Apps	(Points)
–	Warringah Rugby Club		
National sevens team
Years	Team		Comps
2008-09	Australia 7s		

Willie Bishop is a New Zealand rugby footballer who played for the Australian rugby union sevens team.

== Playing career ==
Bishop initially played touch rugby and rugby league and in 2000 he won the New Zealand Junior Sportsperson of the Year and New Zealand Maori Sportsperson of the Year awards. In 2002, while playing for the Hibiscus Coast Raiders, won the Auckland Rugby League's Best and Fairest award.

In 2003 he played for the New Zealand Warriors at the Rugby League World Sevens where he was subsequently signed by the Sydney Roosters. He again played in the 2004 World Sevens for the Roosters.

In 2006 he signed with the Manly Sea Eagles, playing six matches in the NSWRL Premier League and also playing for the Belrose Eagles in the 2007 Jim Beam Cup.

Bishop then switched to rugby union, joining the Warringah Rugby Club. In 2008 he was spotted playing rugby union sevens for the club and called into the Australian team. He again played for Australia in 2009.

== Personal life ==
His father Matt played rugby union for New Zealand Maori and his brother Raymond played for Waikato in the NPC.
