= Howick Hornets =

NZ rugby league club, based in Auckland

Club information
- Full name: Howick Rugby League Football Club
- Nickname: Hornets
- Short name: 'Nets
- Colours: Blue, Maroon and Gold
- Founded: 1961; 65 years ago

Current details
- Ground: Paparoa Park
- Coach: Ruka Loza
- Captain: Jethro Friend
- Competition: Auckland Rugby League

Records
- Premierships: 2011 & 2019
- Minor premierships: 2011
- Sharman Cup: 2005, 2009, Phelan Shield 1999.

The Howick Hornets are a rugby league club based in Howick, New Zealand. The premier team competes in Auckland Rugby League's senior competitions. The club currently competes in the top division, the Fox Memorial Trophy. The club has a historic rivalry with neighbours, the Pakuranga Jaguars The Howick Hornets are former Fox Memorial champions, winning the shield twice so far (2011 and 2019) since they announced themselves in 1st division in 2010.

== History ==
The Howick Rugby League Football Club was founded in 1961 with the team playing at the Howick Domain. Former New Zealand representative Cliff Johnson was the club's first chairman. The club first entered a senior team into Auckland Rugby League competitions in 1964 under coach Tommy Baxter. In 1965 Paparoa Park, the club's current home ground, was created with the help of the Howick Borough Council.

Between 1978 and 1985 the club competed in senior competitions as Eastern United, a combined team with the Pakuranga club. The team was coached by former Kiwi Murray Eade.

The club won the Sharman Cup, the second division title, in 2005 and 2009. In 2005 they defeated the Bay Roskill Vikings 20–16. In 2009 the team won the Sharman Cup by defeating the Glenora Bears 19–12 in extra time. They also won the Auckland Rugby League's 2009 Club of the Year award for the first time ever.

In 2010 the club won promotion to the Fox Memorial Trophy and finished third before losing to the Te Atatu Roosters in a semi final. This was the first time in the club's 49-year history that they had competed in the top division of the Auckland Rugby League. During the season the Hornets defeated the Mt Albert Lions for the first time in three decades and defeated the Otahuhu Leopards for the first time in the club's history. They also hosted a Māori Television broadcast from Paparoa Park for the first time. Six players from the Hornets were named in the Counties Manukau representative team to compete in the Albert Baskerville Trophy.

In 2011, the Hornets won the Fox Memorial, defeating the Otahuhu Leopards 24–14 in the Grand Final.

In 2019, the Hornets would win their second Fox Memorial at Mt Smart Stadium.

== Notable players ==
Players who have played for the club include Paul Atkins, Zeb Luisi, Anthony Gelling, Samuel Brunton, Luke Laban and Isaac John.

== Howick Senior Team Records (2022) ==
The season record for the most senior men's team in the club.

Season	Grade	Name	Played	W	D	L	PF	PA	PD	Pts	Position (Teams)
2022	1st Grade (Fox Memorial)	Howick Hornets	8	6	0	2	228	172	56	12	2nd of 9 in section 1, beat Bay Roskill 44–6 in the QFs, lost to Pt Chevalier 24–12 in the SFs
2022	TOTAL		8	6	0	2	228	172	56	12	
