= Richmond Rovers =

Rugby league club, based in Auckland, New Zealand

Club information
- Full name: Richmond Rovers Rugby League Club
- Nickname: The Bulldogs
- Founded: 1913
- Website: www.richmondroversrugbyleague.com

Current details
- Ground: Grey Lynn Park

Records
- Premierships: (12) 1934, 1935, 1937, 1940, 1946, 1949, 1951, 1955, 1956, 1979, 1980, 2024
- Minor premierships: (Rukutai Shield 11) 1947, 1948, 1949, 1951, 1955, 1956, 1980, 2000, 2001, 2023, 2024
- Rangatira Shield: 1934
- Roope Rooster: 1926, 1927, 1933, 1934, 1938, 1940, 1942, 1949, 1969, 1976, 1990, 2006
- Stormont Shield: (13) 1934, 1935, 1936, 1938, 1946, 1949, 1956, 1976, 1979, 1980, 2007, 2008, 2024
- Sharman Cup: 1953, 1972, 1983, 2008, 2015

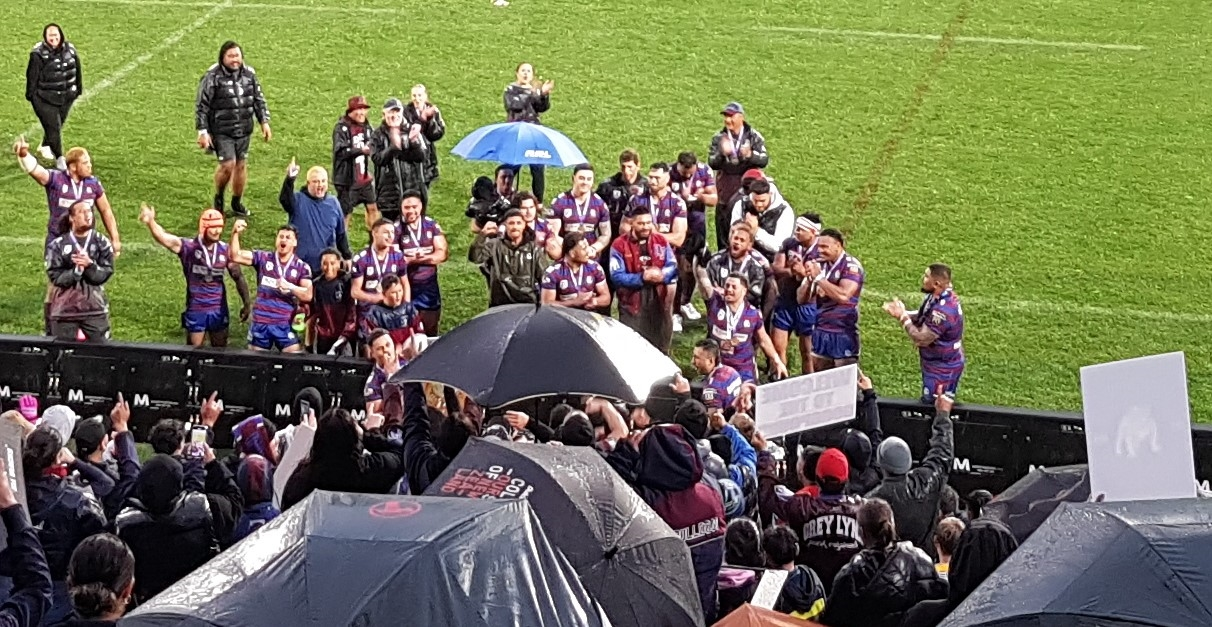
Richmond celebrating winning the 2024 Fox Memorial championship.

The Richmond Rovers Rugby League Club is a rugby league club based in Grey Lynn, New Zealand. The premier team is called the Richmond Bulldogs/Richmond Rovers and compete in Auckland Rugby League's first grade Fox Memorial competition. They have won the first grade championship on 12 occasions.

== Early history ==
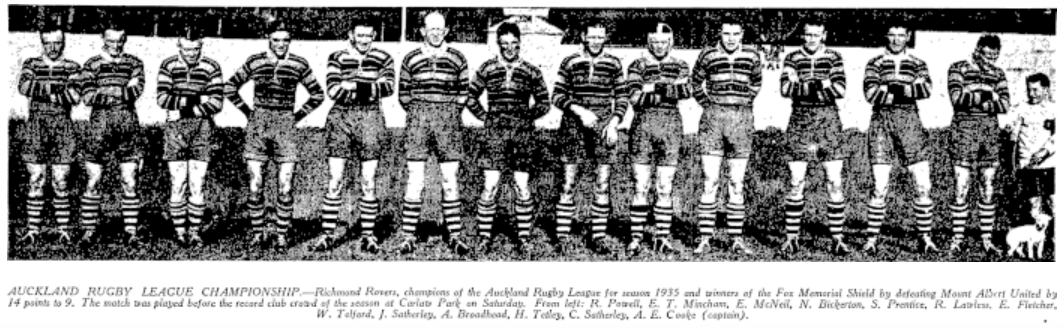

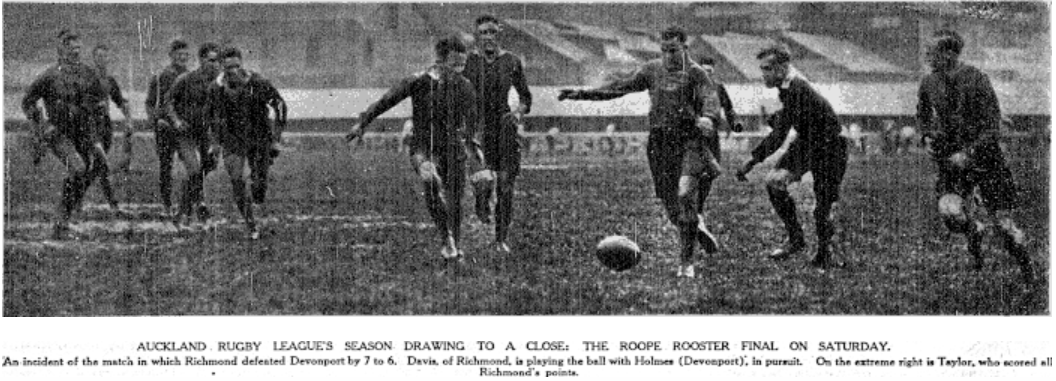
Action from Richmond's Roope Rooster win in 1927 v Devonport (North Shore Albions).

The club was formed in 1913 by employees at Mr. B. W. Davis' Boot Factory and Elliott's, following a scratch game in 1912. They didn't in fact play an official game until 1914 when they affiliated with the Grafton Athletic club and entered a team in the 4th grade and played in the Grafton Athletic colours.

In 1883 the land surrounding Grey Lynn Park was subdivided and the houses were built. The area that is now Grey Lynn Park was too steep to build houses on and so, in 1914, the area was drained and flattened so sport could be played. Flood lights were installed at the park in the 1950s.

Richmond's first ever first grade game was against Athletic (Maritime) on April 22, 1922. They lost 14-2 with Henderson scoring their first ever points in the grade with a penalty.

22 April	Richmond	2–14	Athletic	Grey Lynn Park
3:00	Pen: Henderson		Try: Eric Grey 2, Hall, George Yardley; Con: George Yardley	Referee: T Neill

Richmond enjoyed considerable success in the middle decades of the 1900s. They were the first club ever to win the Fox Memorial, Roope Rooster, and Stormont Shield in a single season (1934). They went on to win these trophies several more times in the following years. They also defeated 4 Australian club teams from 1934 to 1939 (including the Sydney champions - Western Suburbs 18–16, and 10–3 in 1934). This saw them win the Rangatira Shield, played for between Sydney and Auckland clubs. They won the Fox Memorial in 1934, 1935, 1937, 1940, 1946, 1949, 1951, 1955 and 1956.

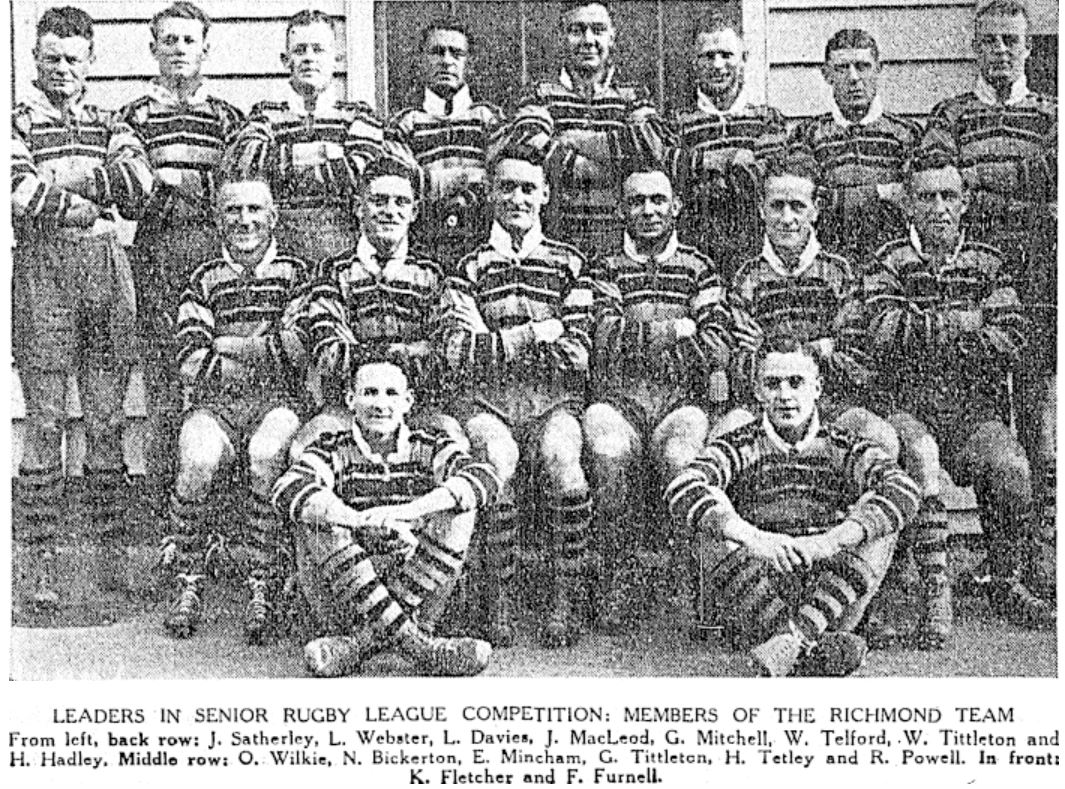
The 1937 Fox Memorial championship winning side.

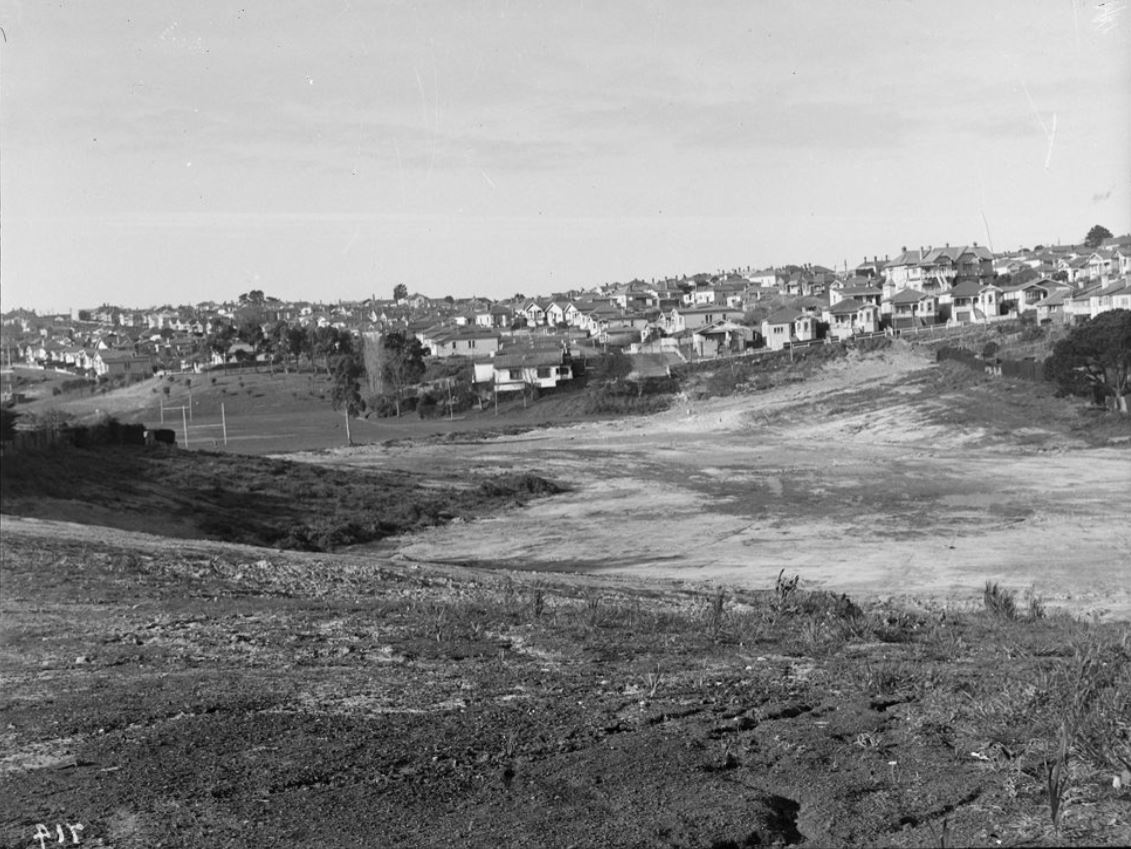
Grey Lynn Park being developed in 1952. In the distance is the main field adjacent to the clubrooms.

== Bartercard Cup ==
The Richmond club were involved in the Bartercard Cup as a joint venture with the Marist Saints between 2000 and 2005. This team was called the Marist Richmond Brothers.

== Notable players ==
48 Richmond Juniors have played for the New Zealand national rugby league team including Nigel Vagana, Fred Ah Kuoi, Steve Matai, David Solomona and Evarn Tuimavave. In addition 19 women have represented the New Zealand Women's team.

Other Warriors such as Tevita Latu, Steve Matai, Sam Lousi, Sione Lousi, John Palavi, Wayne McDade, Daniel Vasau, Evarn Tuimavave, Faavae Kalolo, & Malo Solomona were also Richmond juniors.

American actor Geno Segers had a stint with the club.

A team of the century was named in 2013, and consisted of: 1. Bert Cooke, 2. Nigel Vagana, 3. Tom Baxter, 4. Maurie Robertson, 5. Vern Bakalich, 6. Fred Ah Kuoi, 7. Shane Varley, 8. Joe Vagana, 9. John Lasher, 10. Cliff Johnson (c), 11. Jim Riddell, 12. Se'e Solomona and 13. Raymond Williams.

== Richmond Senior Team Records (1915-1945, 1993-2004 + 2022-24) ==
The season record for the most senior men's team in the club.

Season	Grade	Name	Played	W	D	L	PF	PA	PD	Pts	Position (Teams)
1915	3rd Grade	Richmond	6	1	0	5	17	66	-49	2	10 teams, full results unknown
1916	3rd Grade	Richmond	4	3	0	1	34	21	13	6	8 teams, full results unknown
1917	4th Grade	Richmond	7	4	0	3	25	45	-20	8	8 teams, full results unknown
1918	4th Grade	Richmond	6	5	0	1	34	25	9	10	9 teams, full results unknown
1919	4th Grade	Richmond	7	6	1	0	77	6	71	13	4th of 10
1920	4th Grade	Richmond	7	4	0	3	92	26	66	8	Approx 3rd of 10
1921	4th Grade	Richmond	6	5	0	1	51	13	38	10	Approx 3rd of 8
1922	1st Grade (Monteith)	Richmond	14	3	0	11	141	295	-154	6	7th of 8
1923	1st Grade (Monteith)	Richmond	12	1	0	11	93	239	-146	2	7th of 7
1924	1st Grade (Monteith)	Richmond	16	5	0	11	97	194	-97	10	7th of 9
1925	1st Grade (Monteith)	Richmond	11	4	0	7	155	184	-29	8	5th of 7
1926	1st Grade (Monteith)	Richmond	11	3	0	8	142	176	-34	6	5th of 7
1927	1st Grade (Monteith)	Richmond	12	4	1	7	134	182	-48	9	5th of 7
1928	1st Grade (Monteith)	Richmond	12	7	1	4	143	132	11	15	2nd of 7
1929	1st Grade (Monteith)	Richmond	14	3	0	11	105	161	-56	6	7th of 8
1930	1st Grade (Monteith)	Richmond	13	4	0	9	118	156	-38	8	8th of 8
1931	1st Grade (Fox)	Richmond	12	7	1	4	143	93	50	15	3rd of 7
1932	1st Grade (Fox)	Richmond	10	3	0	7	117	134	-17	6	5th of 6
1933	1st Grade (Fox)	Richmond	10	3	1	6	147	131	16	7	5th of 6
1934	1st Grade (Fox)	Richmond	13	11	0	2	257	108	149	22	1st of 6
1935	1st Grade (Fox)	Richmond	13	10	1	2	217	95	122	21	1st of 7
1936	1st Grade (Fox)	Richmond	14	8	2	4	199	136	63	18	2nd of 8
1937	1st Grade (Fox)	Richmond	14	10	1	3	266	156	110	21	1st of 8
1938	1st Grade (Fox)	Richmond	15	8	1	6	205	180	25	17	5th of 9
1939	1st Grade (Fox)	Richmond	15	7	0	8	171	174	-3	14	6th of 9
1940	1st Grade (Fox)	Richmond	16	12	1	3	303	143	160	25	1st of 9
1941	1st Grade (Fox)	Richmond	15	9	0	6	235	149	86	18	3rd of 9
1942	1st Grade (Fox)	Richmond	15	5	0	10	148	186	-38	10	5th of 6
1943	1st Grade (Fox)	Richmond	16	11	0	5	247	123	124	22	3rd of 9
1944	1st Grade (Fox)	Richmond	18	10	0	8	242	153	89	20	6th of 10
1945	1st Grade (Fox)	Richmond	14	11	0	3	266	100	166	22	2nd of 10
1993	Lion Red Rukutai	Richmond	18	11	1	6	352	353	99.7%	23	2nd of 10, SF 10-7 v Mt Albert, PF 7-3 v Ponsonby, GF 5-11 v Otahuhu. Roope Rooster GF 12-22 v North Shore
1994	Lion Red Rukutai	Richmond	22	10	0	12	596	618	96.4%	20	7th of 12
1995	Lion Red Rukutai	Richmond	24	14	0	10	715	605	118.2%	32	5th of 13
1996	Lion Red Prelim	Richmond	13	5	1	7	318	301	105.6%	11	9th of 14
1998	Super 10	Central Sharks	18	3	1	14	327	601	54.41%	7	9th of 10
1999	Rukutai Shield Super 12	Central Sharks	22	3	1	18	401	740	54.19%	7	12th of 12
2000	Mad Butcher Fox Top 8	Richmond	14	12	1	1	517	254	203.5%	25	1st of 8
	Playoffs	Richmond	3	1	0	2	44	63	-	-	L 10-26 v Ōtāhuhu in minor SF, W 20-16 v Te Atatū in major SF, L 14-21 v Ōtāhuhu in Fox final
2001	Mad Butcher Fox Top 8	Richmond	14	9	2	3	460	385	119.5%	20	
	Playoffs	Richmond	2	1	0	1	51	48	106.3%	-	W 22-18 v Northcote in Major SF, L 29-30 v Northcote in Fox Final
2002	Fox Memorial Top 8	Richmond	14	3	1	10	276	428	64.5%	7	7th of 8
2003	Playoffs	Richmond	3	1	0	2	79	77	-	-	L v Hib Coast 28-41 in PF, W v Marist 32-28 in Minor Final, L v Mangere East 19-24 in Major final
2004	Mad Butcher Fox	Richmond	14	9	0	5	438	322	136%	18	4th of 8
	Playoffs	Richmond	2	1	0	1	42	29	-	-	W 30-10 v Papakura in Prel final, L 12-19 v Manurewa in Minor final
2022	Fox Premiership Section 2	Richmond	9	6	0	3	326	134	192	12	4th of 10 in section 2, W v Marist 34-0 in PF, L v Otahuhu 20-12 in QF
	Playoffs	Richmond	2	1	0	1	46	20	-	-	W 34-0 v Marist in Prel SF, L v Otahuhu 20-12 in QF
2023	Fox Grading	Richmond	3	2	0	1	98	48	204.2%	4	2nd of 4 in Pool B
	Fox (Rukutai Shield)	Richmond	11	9	1	1	316	116	272.4%	19	1st of 12 (Rukutai winner)
	Playoffs	Richmond	2	1	0	1	24	30	-	-	W v Papakura 8-6 in Major SF, L v Pt Chevalier in Grand Final
2024	Fox Grading	Richmond	3	2	0	1	122	30	+92	4	2nd of 4 in Pool A
	Fox (Rukutai Shield)	Richmond	11	10	0	1	383	147	+236	20	1st of 12 (Rukutai winner)
	Playoffs	Richmond	2	2	0	0	38	26	-	-	W v Pt Chevalier 23-12 in PF, W v Papakura in GF 15-14 (after ET)
1922-45, 1993–96, 2000-2002, 2004, 2022-2024	TOTAL		594	303	20	272	10590	9359	-	614	

== Club Titles ==
=== Richmond Rovers grade championships (1910-1944) ===
- 1921 Sixth Grade
- 1922 Fourth Grade
- 1923 Fifth Grade
- 1924 Second Grade B Section winners (lost final to Otahuhu 17-5, who won the A Section), Fourth Grade B Section winners (lost final to Ponsonby, who were A Section winners), Fifth Grade knockout (Section B)
- 1925 Second Grade, Fourth Grade, Fifth Grade, Sixth Grade A, & Sixth Grade B
- 1926 Third Grade Intermediate, & Fifth Grade
- 1927 Third Grade Intermediate and Third Grade knockout competition, Fourth Grade (Hospital Cup), & Sixth Grade B (Myers Cup)
- 1928 Third Grade Open, Third Grade Intermediate, & Fourth Grade
- 1929 Third Grade Open, Fifth Grade, Sixth Grade A, & Sixth Grade B
- 1930 Second Grade, Fourth Grade & Fourth Grade knockout, Seventh Grade & Seventh Grade knockout, & Schoolboys (Richmond Schools A)
- 1931 Third Grade Intermediate, & Seventh Grade
- 1932 Reserve Grade, & Sixth Grade
- 1933 Reserve Grade, Fifth Grade, & Seventh Grade
- 1934 First Grade (Fox Memorial), Reserve Grade, Third Grade Open, & Seventh Grade
- 1935 First Grade (Fox Memorial), Second Grade, Fifth Grade, Sixth Grade A, Seventh Grade, & Schoolboys (Senior)
- 1936 Sixth Grade A, & Schoolboys (Senior)
- 1937 First Grade (Fox Memorial), Reserve Grade, Fourth Grade, Schoolboys (Senior)
- 1938 Reserve Grade, Third Grade Open, Seventh Grade, Schoolboy (Senior), Schoolboy (Intermediate)
- 1939 Reserve Grade, Sixth Grade A, Seventh Grade
- 1940 First Grade (Fox Memorial), Reserve Grade, Fifth Grade, Seventh Grade, Schoolboys (Senior)
- 1941 Sixth Grade

==== Other titles ====
- 1926 Roope Rooster
- 1927 Roope Rooster
- 1933 Roope Rooster
- 1934 Roope Rooster, & Stormont Shield
- 1935 Stormont Shield
- 1936 Stormont Shield
- 1938 Roope Rooster, & Stormont Shield
- 1940 Roope Rooster
- 1942 Roope Rooster

=== All time top point scorers (1922-1945) ===
The point scoring lists are compiled from first grade matches in the championship, Roope Rooster, Phelan Shield, Stormont Shield, Sharman Cup, official exhibition matches including organised preseason rounds, and organised friendly matches.

Top point scorers
No	Player	Start	End	Games	Tries	Con	Pen	DG	Pts
1	Ted Mincham	1928	1942	124	59	54	36	0	357
2	L 'Snowy' Taylor	1926	1930	40	22	42	37	3	230
3	Cliff Satherley	1933	1943	62	19	53	25	0	213
4	Bernard Lowther (snr)	1941	1945	62	44	24	9	0	198
5	Frank Furnell	1937	1945	54	8	58	26	0	192
6	Charles W Webb	1939	1942	46	2	57	14	0	148
7	Wally Tittleton	1936	1943	118	42	0	0	0	126
8=	Reece Marshall	1932	1936	31	13	26	17	0	125
8=	George Tittleton	1936	1941	50	25	21	4	0	125
10	Stan Prentice	1926	1935	131	40	0	0	0	120
11	Bill Telford	1927	1937	132	39	1	0	0	119
12	Alf Broadhead	1934	1941	110	35	1	0	0	107
13	Leo Davis	1936	1945	146	31	4	0	0	101
14	J McDonald	1942	1944	45	10	29	5	1	100
15	Jack Magill	1941	1945	77	5	24	17	0	97
16=	Trevor Bramley	1938	1940	42	5	23	14	0	89
16=	Dave Solomon	1939	1941	46	21	11	2	0	89
18	Laurie Mills	1938	1940	47	29	0	0	0	87
19	William Kinney	1942	1945	48	28	0	0	0	84
20	Eric Hugh (Mick) Carroll	1922	1928	43	4	27	8	0	82
21	Ernest McNeil	1933	1935	42	27	0	0	0	81
22=	Ray Lawless	1929	1935	82	26	0	0	0	78
22=	George Mitchell	1937	1942	70	26	0	0	0	78
24	Jack Satherley	1934	1945	128	24	1	1	0	76
25=	Ralph Jenkinson	1925	1934	90	25	0	0	0	75
25=	Ron McGregor	1942	1945	61	25	0	0	0	75
27	Merv Devine	1938	1940	59	17	9	2	0	73
28	Bert Cooke	1932	1937	50	18	4	5	0	72
29=	Abbie Graham	1938	1941	45	22	0	0	0	66
29=	Harold Tetley	1934	1938	64	22	0	0	0	66
29=	Owen Wilkie	1936	1937	37	22	0	0	0	66

== See also ==
- Auckland Rugby League club trophies
- Fox Memorial Grand Finals
