= Manukau Magpies =

New Zealand rugby league club, based in Māngere, Auckland

Manukau Rugby League Football & Sports Club Inc

Club information
- Nickname: Magpies
- Colours: Black / White
- Founded: 1912
- Website: manukauleague.co.nz

Current details
- Ground: Moyle Park, Māngere
- Competition: Auckland Rugby League

Records
- Premierships: 1936, 1942, 1943
- Minor premierships: 1943, 1985
- National Club Competition: 1985
- Roope Rooster: 1936, 1941, 1943, 1979, 1980, 1983, 1985, 1986
- Stormont Shield: 1941, 1942, 1943, 1980, 1983, 1984, 1986
- Sharman Cup: 1977, 2004, 2019
- Phelan Shield: 1938, 1939, 2009

The Manukau Magpies are a rugby league football club based in Māngere, a suburb of Auckland in New Zealand, who compete in the Auckland Rugby League. The club was established in March 1912 after a meeting in Onehunga (where they were originally based). That year they fielded a senior team and two junior teams.

== History ==
Established in 1912, the club played as the Manukau Rovers with Jim Rukutai as club captain. The club was officially affiliated with the Auckland Rugby League at their annual meeting on 16 April.

Their first committee selected at that first meeting in March 1912 was Patron: Mr. F.W. Lang, (M.P.); President: Mr. John R. Sceates; Secretary: Mr. H.V. Pattin; Treasurer: Mr. H.E. Reynolds; Committee: Messrs R.W. Sansbury, T.A. George, J.B. Morton, T. Grundy, H.E. Reynolds, A. Patten, E. Pullan, Jim Rukutai, and S. Child (chairman).

In their first season they had 53 registered members. Their senior team squad was made up of the following players: Jim Rukutai, Arthur Hardgrave, Pullen, Strong, Alexander, Targuse, Hughes, Griffiths, McGechan, Clark (2), Kennedy, Tole, Wilson, and Moore (2). They finished the 1912 season with 3 wins and 7 losses. In the 1913 season they struggled to put a full team on the field and pulled out of the senior grade after playing just 5 matches. In 1914 they fielded junior teams only and this continued until 1923 when they amalgamated with the Māngere club to enter a senior team in the competition named "Mangere United".

In 1924 the entire club switched codes and became a rugby union club. They were extremely critical of the Auckland Rugby League and stated that they had been on the end of a number of poor decisions over the previous three seasons particularly to do with player registrations. The details of which were laid out in a letter from the club secretary which was published in the Auckland Star on 12 July 1924. Auckland Rugby League responded stating that the details in the letter were not correct.

=== Rebirth and first championship ===
The Manukau Rugby League club was reborn at a meeting in Onehunga on 29 September 1932 with Jim Rukutai in attendance

.

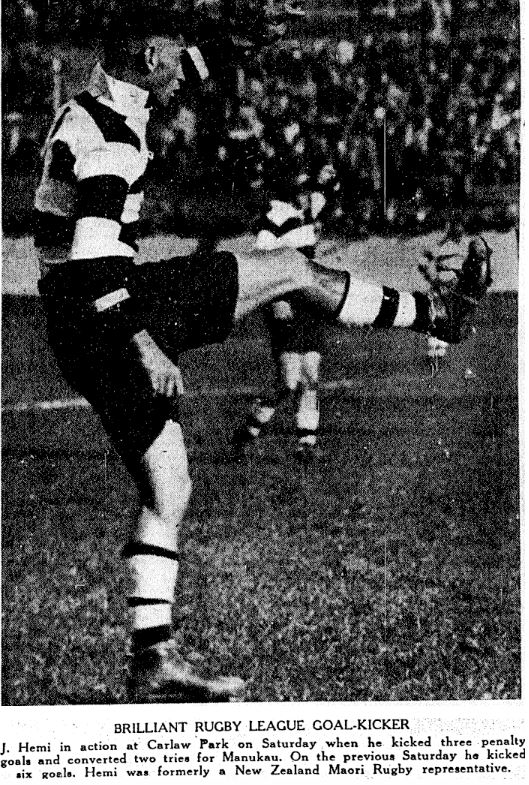
Jack Hemi kicking a penalty v City in 1936.

The club was initially mainly active in junior grades until 1936 when a senior team was re-established after Steve Watene, a Kiwi international convinced Auckland Rugby League that the team he had built from scratch would be competitive. Watene had travelled through many parts of the North Island recruiting players, including Jack Hemi, Joe Boughton, and Len Kawe (who had represented New Zealand Māori in 1925), Tom Trevarthan from Otago rugby. History was made that year when they took out the Championship (Fox Memorial), and Roope Rooster knockout competition in their first season back in the top grade since the 1913 season. Watene became the first ever Māori player to captain the Kiwi's Coffee, John; Wood, Bernie (2009). Auckland 100 Years of Rugby League. Huia. pp. 115–117. ISBN 978-1-86969-366-4.. Jack Hemi played 14 games and scored 92 points through four tries, 39 goals and a drop goal. Steve Watene played in 17 games and scored six tries and kicked 20 goals, while Angus Gault scored seven tries.

The club celebrated its centenary in 2011. Dean Bell was named as the Manukau Player of the Century. Given the club moved to the rugby union code in 1924 and wasn't re-established as a league club until 1932 the 2020 season would mark the 100th year of the club playing rugby league.

== Notable players ==
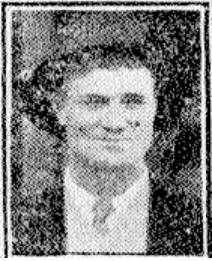
Arthur Hardgrave

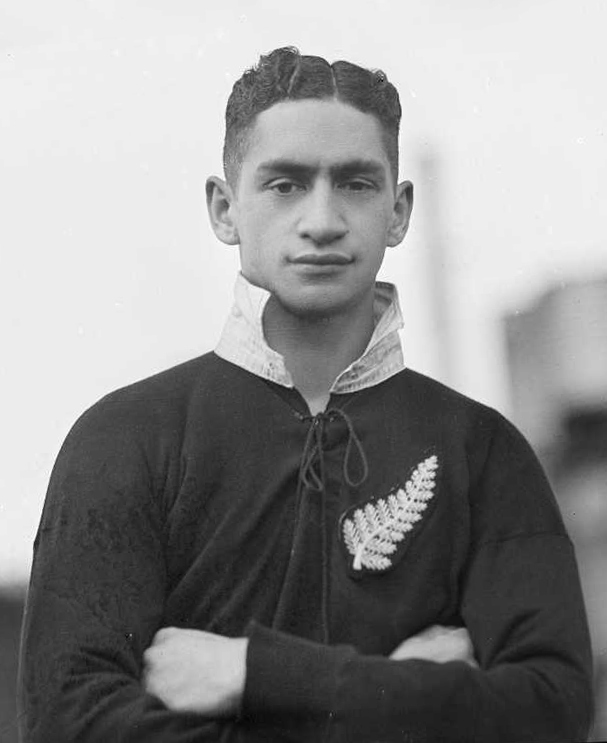
Jack Hemi

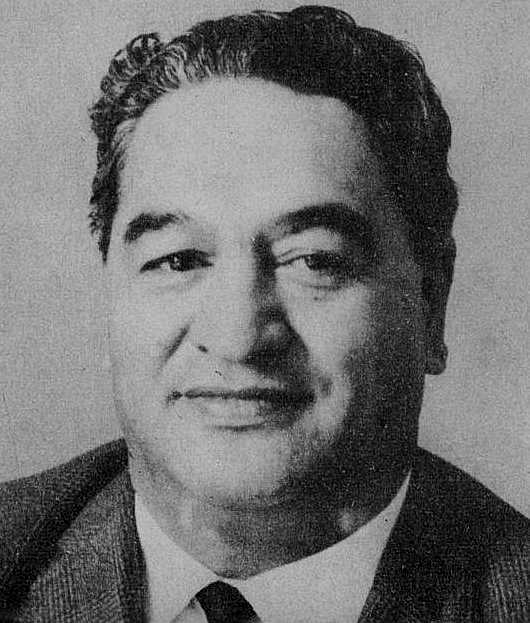
Puti Tipene Watene

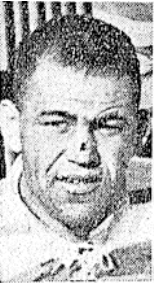
Frank Pickrang

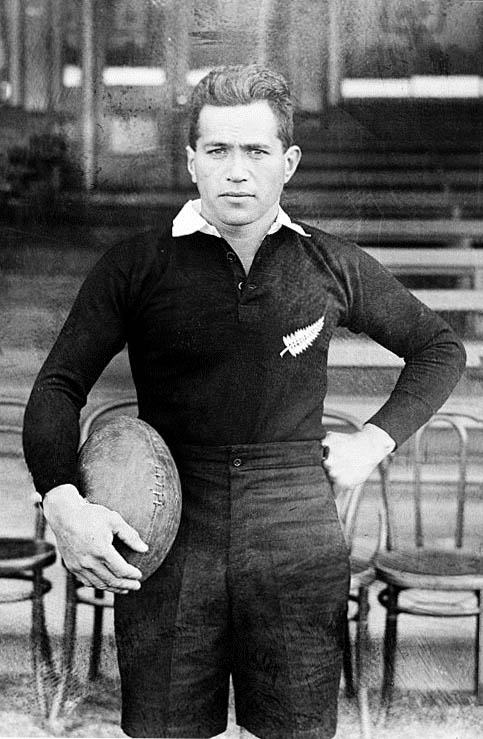
George Nēpia

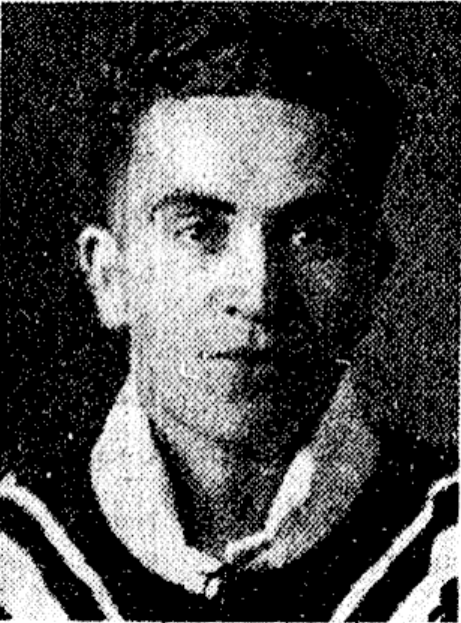
Rangi Chase

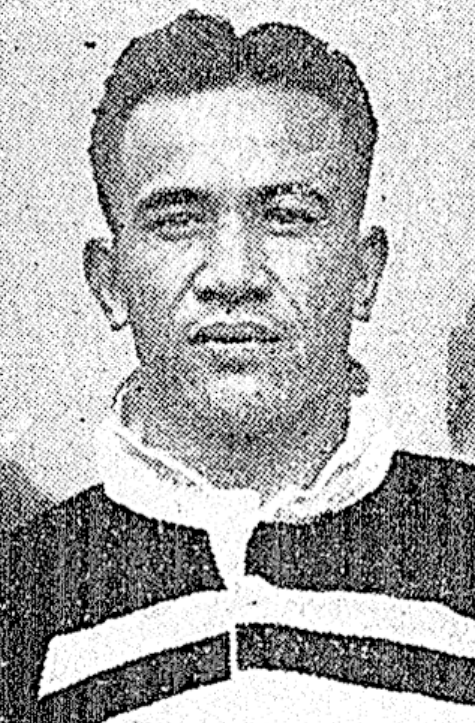
Tommy Chase

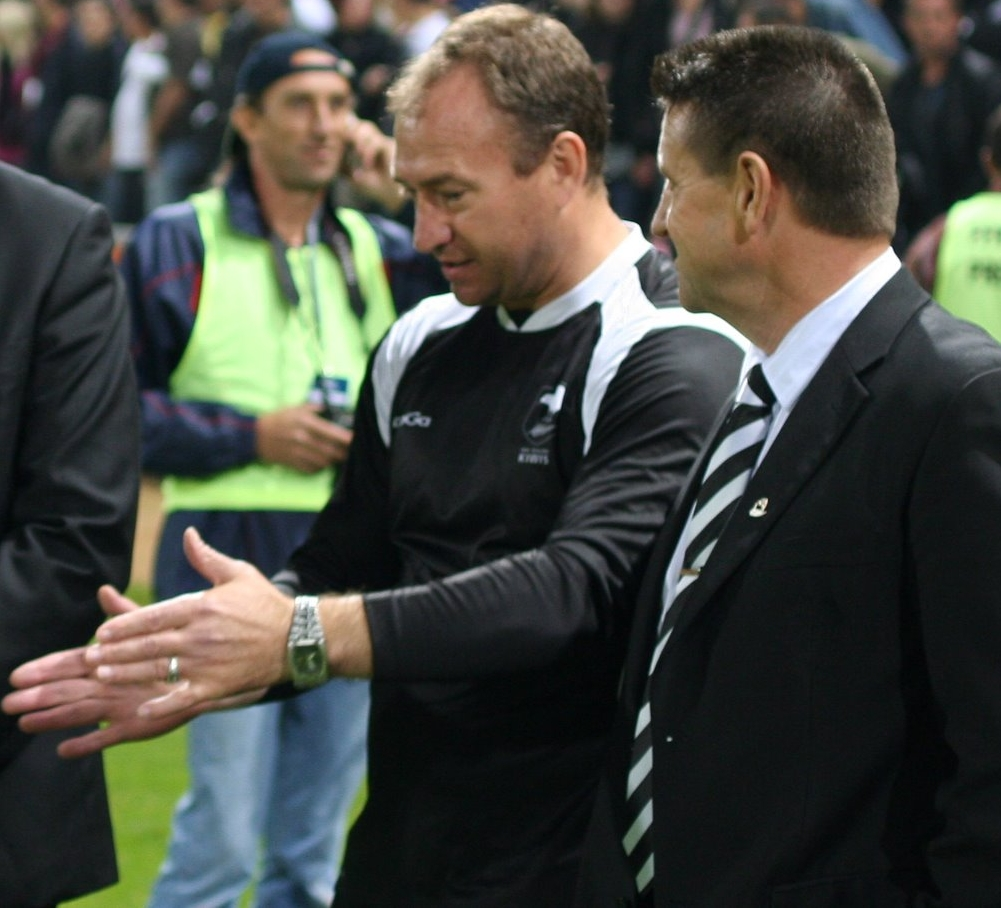
Dean Bell

Arthur Hardgrave was Manukau's first New Zealand representative in 1912. He scored their only points in their first ever first grade game against Ponsonby with a try and a penalty on May 11, 1912 at Eden Park 2. He played in all 7 of New Zealand's matches on the 1912 tour of Australia at fullback, kicking 4 goals. In 1913 the Manukau first grade side folded and Hardgrave was granted a transfer to North Shore Albions before joining Otahuhu Rovers in 1914. His son Roy Hardgrave also represented New Zealand in 1928 and played for St Helen's in England. Another notable player in the early Manukau side was Jim Rukutai who had already represented New Zealand Māori, Auckland, and New Zealand. He played four game, scoring two tries for Manukau this season.

In 1936 the Manukau club travelled around the North Island recruiting players to join their side for a re-entry into the first grade competition in Auckland including Steve Watene who captained the side after having played seven seasons for City Rovers before transferring. They secured the services of an astounding group of talent which ultimately carried them to the first grade Fox Memorial championship in 1936. They included Jack Hemi from the Wairarapa, Frank Pickrang and Len Kawe from the King Country, and Angus Gault who had been born in Scotland but moved to New Zealand aged 16 to farm in the King Country, and Jack Brodrick in August of 1936. Brodrick was 23 years old and had been born in Ruatoke North in the Bay of Plenty. Others included Thomas Trevathan from North Otago, Joe Broughton, Joe Murray, Peter Mahima, and Jack Whye.

Then in 1937 Rangi Chase from Moawhango in Whanganui along with his brother Tommy Chase, came to Manukau, as did Pita Ririnui, Thomas Trevarthan from Otago, and then George Nēpia from All Black fame who had converted to rugby league in 1937 but played for Manukau in 1938 & 1939. In 1938 Walter Brimble joined the Manukau side after transferring from Manukau rugby. His brothers Ted Brimble and Wilfred Brimble all grew up in Onehunga after moving to New Zealand and were of English (father) and South African (mother) origin and also played for New Zealand though were at the Newton club.

The club later had a close association with the Bell family as Dean Bell, Ian Bell and Clayton Friend all played for the club and Cameron Bell coached the club.

The following players have played for Manukau and gone on to make the New Zealand national rugby league team with the year(s):

- Arthur Hardgrave 1912
- Jack Hemi 1936
- Puti Tipene (Steve) Watene 1936
- Frank Pickrang 1936
- Thomas Trevathan 1936
- George Nēpia 1937
- Walter Pierrepont Brimble 1938
- John Purewa (Jack) Brodrick 1938-39
- Rangi Chase 1937–38
- Angus Gault 1938-39
- Tommy Chase 1939
- Pita Ririnui 1939
- Lummy Graham 1970
- Doug Gailey 1974
- Ian Bell 1978–83
- Clayton Friend 1982–91
- Dean Bell 1983–89
- Nick Wright 1983
- Kelly Shelford 1989–91

== Manukau Senior Team Records (1912-24, 1933-45, 1990, 1992-96, 1998-99, 2001-02, 2004, 2022-26) ==
The season record for the most senior men’s team in the club.

Season	Grade	Name	Played	W	D	L	PF	PA	PD	Pts	Position (Teams)
1912	1st Grade (Myers Cup)	Manukau NUFC	10	3	0	7	57	139	-82	6	5th of 6
1913	1st Grade (Myers Cup)	Manukau NUFC	5	0	1	4	21	56	-35	1	6th of 6 (defaulted R5 & R6 & withdrew)
1914	3rd Grade	Manukau NUFC	6	3	0	3	45	53	-8	6	5th of 10, full results unknown
1915	3rd Grade	Manukau NUFC	6	2	0	4	24	38	-14	4	4th of 8, full results unknown
1916	5th Grade	Manukau NUFC	7	5	1	1	51	24	27	11	2nd of 7, full results unknown
1917											Did not field any teams
1918	3rd Grade	Manukau NUFC	4	3	0	1	54	19	35	6	2nd of 5, full results unknown
1919	3rd Grade	Manukau NUFC	8	8	0	0	18	0	16	16	1st of 6, full results unknown
1920	3rd Grade	Manukau NUFC	5	5	0	0	64	26	38	10	1st of 6, full results unknown
1921	2nd Grade	Manukau Rovers	2	1	0	1	19	19	0	2	6th of 10, full results unknown
1922	2nd Grade	Manukau Rovers	4	3	0	1	30	21	9	6	6th of 13, full results unknown
1923	3rd Grade	Manukau Rovers	6	5	1	0	87	3	84	11	3rd of 14, full results unknown
1924	2nd Grade	Manukau Rovers	2	2	0	0	20	0	20	4	8th of 12
1925-32	Joined ARU late in 1924, then reformed the RL club in late 1932										
1933	2nd Grade (Wright Cup)	Manukau	12	0	0	12	13	120	-107	0	7th of 7
1934	3rd Grade Intermediate	Manukau B Rovers	23	11	1	11	-	-	-	23	6th of 13
1935	2nd Grade	Manukau	-	-	-	-	-	-	-	-	6th of 7
1936	Fox Memorial	Manukau	14	9	1	4	223	197	+26	19	1st of 8
1937	Fox Memorial	Manukau	14	7	2	5	233	184	49	16	4th of 8
1938	Fox Memorial	Manukau	15	9	1	5	226	211	15	19	4th of 9
1939	Fox Memorial	Manukau	16	7	1	8	240	244	-4	15	4th of 9
1940	Fox Memorial	Manukau	15	8	1	6	214	195	19	17	4th of 9
1941	Fox Memorial	Manukau	16	13	0	3	360	115	245	26	2nd of 9, the 360 points scored was a first grade competition record
1942	Fox Memorial	Manukau	15	13	0	2	283	110	+173	26	1st of 6
1943	Fox Memorial	Manukau	16	14	0	2	253	108	+145	28	1st of 9
1944	Fox Memorial	Manukau	18	11	2	5	194	119	75	24	3rd of 10
1945	Fox Memorial	Manukau	14	5	0	9	189	188	1	10	8th of 10
	Roope Rooster	Manukau	1	0	0	1	15	18	-	-	L v Mt Albert in R1
1990	Lion Red Premiership	Manukau Magpies	21	5	1	15	354	585	60.51%	11	8th of 8
1992	Lion Red Premiership	Manukau Magpies	18	8	0	10	316	392	80.61%	16	7th of 10
1993	Lion Red Premiership	Manukau Magpies	18	10	0	8	408	395	103.3	20	3rd of 10
	Playoffs		2	0	0	2	16	38			L v Richmond 10-16 in min. SF, L v Te Atatū 6-22 in maj. SF
1994	Lion Red Rukutai Shield	Manukau Magpies	18	10	0	8	352	564	62.41	16	10th of 12
1995	Lion Red Rukutai Shield	Manukau Magpies	24	14	0	10	610	475	128.4	28	4th of 12
	Playoffs		?	-	-	-	-	-	-	-	?
1996	Lion Red Preliminary Round	Manukau Magpies	13	5	1	7	259	280	92.5	11	10th of 14
	Sharman Cup	?	-	-	-	-	-	-	-	?	?
1998	Super 10	Manukau Magpies	18	6	0	12	391	617	63.37	12	7th of 10
1999	Rukutai Shield Super 12	Manukau Magpies	22	5	0	17	405	701	57.77	10	10th of 12
2001	Mad Butcher Fox Memorial Top 8	Manukau Magpies	14	6	4	4	431	442	97.51	16	4th of 8
	Playoffs		1	0	0	1	28	38	-	-	L v Otahuhu in prelim. SF after extra time
2002	Fox Memorial Top 8	Manukau Magpies	14	3	1	10	317	434	73.04	7	6th of 8
2004	Sharman Cup	Manukau Magpies	14	11	1	2	547	318	172	23	1st of 8
	Playoffs		2	2	0	0	70	46			W v Howick 46-26 in min. F, W v Te Atatū 24-20 in GF
2022	Fox Memorial	Manukau Magpies	8	4	1	3	180	172	8	9	5th of 9 in section 1
	Playoffs		1	0	0	1	22	28			L v Bay Roskill 22-28 in PO round
2023	Fox Qualifiers	Manukau Magpies	3	2	0	1	102	62	164.5	4	2nd of 4 in Pool A
	Fox Memorial Shield		11	3	1	7	170	268	63.4		10th of 12
2024	Fox Qualifiers	Manukau Magpies	3	2	0	1	44	76	-32	4	2nd of 4 in Pool B
	Fox Memorial Shield		11	5	1	5	264	274	-10	11	7th of 12
2025	Fox Qualifiers	Manukau Magpies	3	3	0	0	94	40	54	6	1st of 4 in Pool C
	Fox Memorial Shield		12	8	1	3	289	202	-87	17	3rd of 12
	Playoffs		2	1	0	1	30	28	2	-	W v Bay Roskill 30-28 in QF, L v Mt ALbert 16-22 in SF
2026	Fox Memorial Shield		14	7	2	4	348	276	+72	17	2nd of 8
	Playoffs		2	0	0	2	24	76	-52	-	L v Otahuhu 12-54 in Maj SF, L v Mt Albert 12-22 in Maj SF
1912-2026	TOTAL		522	262	26	2	8,940	8,982	-42	549	

== Club titles (1912-1945) ==
- 1919 Third Grade
- 1920 Third Grade and Fifth Grade
- 1922 Second Grade knockout competition
- 1936 First Grade (Fox Memorial)
- 1938 Phelan Shield
- 1939 Phelan Shield
- 1941 Thistle Cup (highest point scorers in the 2nd round), Roope Rooster, Stormont Shield
- 1942 First Grade (Fox Memorial), Stormont Shield
- 1943 First Grade (Fox Memorial), Roope Rooster, Stormont Shield

== Manukau Magpies top point scorers and try scorers (1912-1945) ==
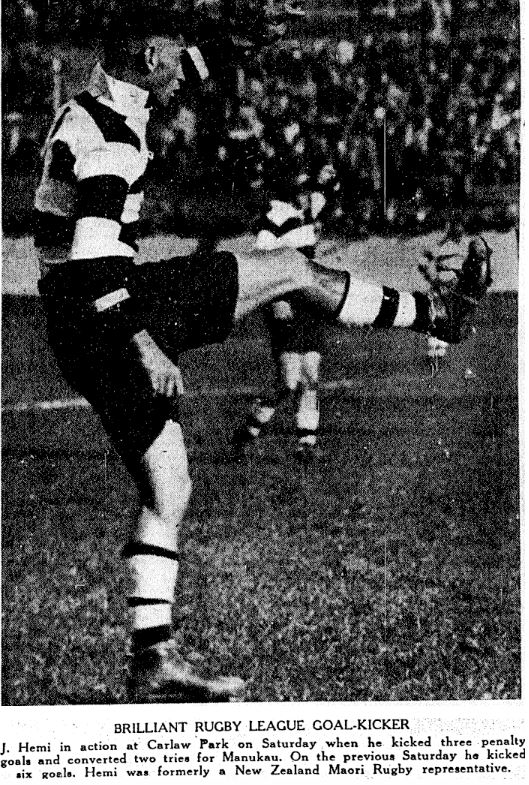
Jack Hemi kicking for Manukau in 1936.

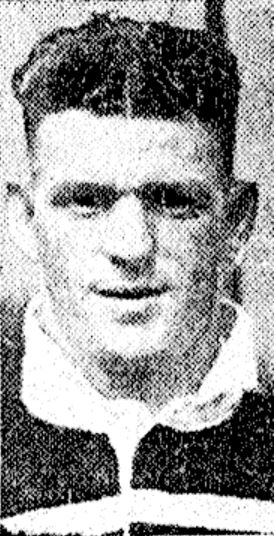
Angus Gault in 1939.

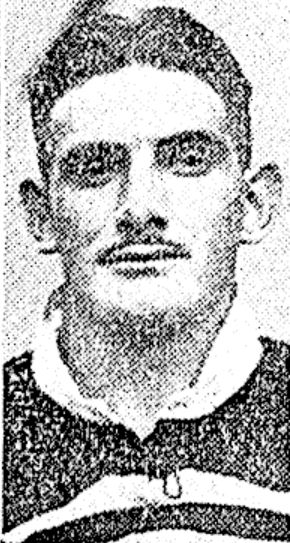
Jack Brodrick in 1939.

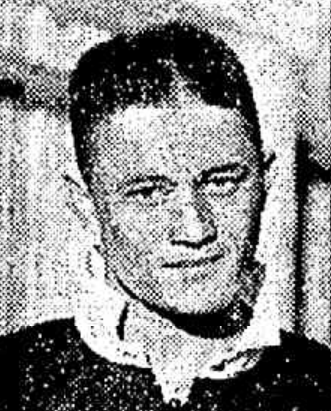
Walter Brimble

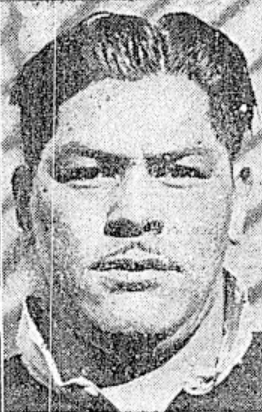
Pita Ririnui

The point scoring lists are compiled from matches played in the first grade side including organised preseason games, and exhibition type matches.

Rank	Player	Start	End	Games	Tries	Con	Pen	DG	Pts
1	Jack Hemi	1936	1943	108	36	194	106	8	724
2	Tommy Chase	1937	1945	126	32	111	57	1	434
3	Tom Butler	1940	1945	110	52	35	22	0	270
4	Joe Murray	1941	1945	88	65	12	5	1	231
5	Puti Tipene (Steve) Watene	1936	1943	82	23	19	17	0	141
6	George Shilton	1938	1945	117	38	0	0	0	114
7	Jack Brodrick	1936	1944	79	35	0	0	0	105
8	Joe Broughton	1936	1942	78	26	4	0	0	86
9	Aubrey Thompson	1941	1944	53	28	0	0	0	84
10=	Peter Mahima	1936	1940	74	26	0	0	0	78
10=	Pita Ririnui	1938	1947	137	26	0	0	0	78
12	Wiremu Te Tai	1940	1945	83	24	0	0	0	72
13	Rangi Chase	1937	1938	17	17	0	0	1	53
14	Angus Gault	1936	1939	61	17	0	0	0	51
15	Peter Awhitu	1939	1943	27	13	0	1	0	41
16=	Walter Brimble	1936	1941	59	13	0	0	0	39
16=	R Wilson	1937	1938	24	13	0	0	0	39
18	Freddie McGuire	1938	1943	58	12	0	0	0	36
19	Ralph Martin	1940	1945	97	9	3	1	0	35
20=	George (Tiki) Whye	1936	1939	45	11	0	0	0	33
20=	W Rogers	1943	1945	35	11	0	0	0	33
22=	Ivan Gregory	1939	1942	22	10	0	0	0	30
22=	Martin Thompson	1943	1945	21	10	0	0	0	30
24=	Jack Major	1941	1945	53	8	0	0	0	24
24=	George Nēpia	1938	1939	14	2	6	2	1	24

=== Manukau Rovers/Magpies Head to Head records (1912-1913, 1936) ===
Head to head records by opponent
Opponent	Start	Finish	Games	Wins	Draws	Losses	For	Against	Pts diff
Eden Ramblers	1912	1913	3	2	0	1	35	19	+16
Taumarunui	1936	-	1	1	0	0	30	28	+2

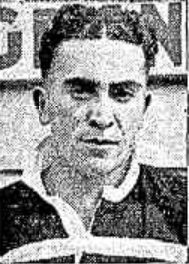
Rangi Chase in a Manukau jersey in 1938.
