= East Coast Bays Barracudas =

Club information
- Full name: East Coast Bays Rugby League Club
- Nickname(s): The Cudas
- Colours: Green, Black
- Founded: 1971

Current details
- Ground(s): Freyberg Park
- Coach: Ken McIntosh
- Manager: Cameron Dick
- Competition: Auckland Rugby League

Records
- Roope Rooster: 2006
- Sharman Cup: 2010
- Phelan Shield: 2003

The East Coast Bays Barracudas is a rugby league club based in Browns Bay, New Zealand. Currently, they compete in the Sharman Cup, the second division in Auckland Rugby League. Coached by Ken McIntosh and managed by Cameron Dick, the "Cudas" are currently based at Freyberg Park.

== Notable players ==
Notable former juniors include Louis, Fraser & Vinnie Anderson, Aaron Heremaia, Shaun Kenny-Dowall, Vince Mellars, Jeremiah Pai, and Anthony Swann Jesse Arthars

== Grades ==
Under 5/6 Restricted - Under 7/8 Restricted - Under 9/10 Restricted - Under 11/12 Restricted - Under 13/14 Restricted - Under 15/16 Restricted - Under 17/18 Restricted - Under 6 Open - Under 7 Open - Under 8 Open - Under 9 Open - Under 10 Open - Under 11 Open - Under 12 Open - Under 13 Open - Under 14 Open - Under 15 Open - Under 16 Open - Under 17 Open - Under 18 Open - Masters - Premiers - Reserves
