= Papakura Sea Eagles =

Rugby league club based in Papakura, Auckland, New Zealand

Club information
- Full name: Papakura Sea Eagles Rugby League Sports Club
- Colours: Maroon and White
- Founded: 1931
- Website: papakurarugbyleague.co.nz/

Current details
- Grounds: Prince Edward Park; Ray Small Park
- Competition: Auckland Rugby League

Records
- Premierships: 2016
- Minor premierships: 2002, 2005, 2007
- Roope Rooster: 2007
- Sharman Cup: 1936, 1937

The Papakura Sea Eagles are an Auckland rugby league club based in Papakura. The Sea Eagles currently compete in the Fox Memorial competition run by the Auckland Rugby League.

== History ==
The Papakura Rugby League Club formed in 1931. On March 26 they had 60 players enroll to play. They applied to the Papakura Town Board for the use of the reserve at Papakura. This was granted as the entire club had switched over from Rugby Union meaning they had no competition for the field. The council said that if a representative rugby game was being played on the field then the league team could use Prince Edward Park (which later became their home ground and remains so to this day). On Saturday, 18 April they played a practice match with Mount Wellington at Papakura. The match was won by Mt Wellington by 8 points to 5. Papakura's points came from an unconverted try to Johnstone, and Ivan Wilson kicked a penalty goal.

Their first ever grade wins were in the 1931 and 1932 second grade which was essentially the modern day equivalent of the second division. Some of their early notable players from the early 1930s were Cyril Blacklaws and Mortimer Stephens who both played their junior rugby league for Papakura. They later moved to Newton Rangers to play senior league and were signed by St Helens in England. Blacklaws played 35 games for St Helens from 1935–36 and then signed with Rochdale Hornets, while Stephens played 56 games for St Helens from 1935–37 and also moved to Rochdale Hornets before returning to New Zealand.

They won the Sharman Cup in 1936 by winning the Senior B grade having finished runner-up in 1935. They won the Walmsley Shield in 1936 also. In 1937 they once again won the Sharman Cup.

In 2016, the premiers went on a solid run throughout the season, only losing 2 games and winning the clubs first ever Fox Memorial Premiership. They also went on to another grand final in 2024, and unfortunately fell short in hard fought match in very tough conditions, losing in extra time to a drop goal.

== Kiwi representatives ==
To date, seven players from the club have represented the New Zealand national rugby league team. The first New Zealand player to represent Papakura was Harold Milliken who joined the club in 1940 after playing for New Zealand in 1939 however he did not represent the national side whilst at Papakura.

- Bevin Hough: 1950, 1953
- Brian Lee: 1961–1963
- Reg Cooke: 1961, 1964
- Roger Tait: 1965–1967
- Lyndsay Proctor: 1974, 1975
- Gary Kemble: 1980–1986
- Kelly Shelford: 1989–1991
- Jason Taumalolo: 1997

== Notable juniors ==
- Billy Ngawini
- Jazz Tevaga

== Papakura senior team records (1931–1943 + 2022) ==
The season record for the most senior men's team in the club.

Season	Grade	Name	Played	W	D	L	PF	PA	PD	Pts	Position (teams)
1931	2nd Grade	Papakura	15	10	1	4	107	83	24	21	3rd of 8 (won KO final 26-0 v Mt Albert)
1932	2nd Grade	Papakura	17	13	0	4	243	91	152	26	1st of 9 (won the final 5-2 v Otahuhu), lost KO SF v Mt Albert 8-17.
1933	2nd Grade	Papakura	12	7	2	3	143	53	90	16	3rd of 7
1934	2nd Grade	Papakura	14	11	1	2	137	41	96	23	2nd of 6, won the KO final over Māngere United 26-3.
1935	Senior B (Sharman Cup)	Papakura	9	7	0	2	133	50	83	14	2nd of 4
1936	Senior B (Sharman Cup)	Papakura	8	8	0	0	123	23	100	16	1st of 5
1937	Senior B (Sharman Cup)	Papakura	15	14	0	1	304	74	230	28	1st of 9
1938	1st Grade (Fox Memorial)	Papakura	15	2	0	13	153	279	-126	4	9th of 9
1939	1st Grade (Fox Memorial)	Papakura	16	2	2	12	132	256	-124	6	9th of 9
1940	1st Grade (Fox Memorial)	Papakura	15	1	0	14	131	387	-256	2	9th of 9
1941	1st Grade (Fox Memorial)	Papakura	16	1	0	15	130	392	-262	2	9th of 9
1942	Schoolboys (Senior)	Papakura	-	-	-	-	-	-	-	-	-
1943	4th Grade	Papakura	-	-	-	-	-	-	-	-	-
2022	1st Grade (Fox Memorial)	Papakura	9	1	0	8	68	550	12.36%	2	9th of 10 in section 2, lost to Papatoetoe in the elimination game of the Sharman Cup
1931-41, 2022	TOTAL		161	77	6	78	1804	2279	-475	160	
