= 1939 Auckland Rugby League season =

The 1939 Auckland Rugby League season was its 31st.

Mount Albert United won their first ever Fox Memorial Shield title with a 13 win, 1 draw, 2 loss record. North Shore Albions were 6 competition points further back. After 12 rounds, Mount Albert (17) trailed North Shore (18) by one competition point before North Shore could only secure a win and a draw from their last 5 matches while Mount Albert won all five to run away with the title.

Marist Old Boys beat Mount Albert in the Roope Rooster final 13–11. This was the 5th time Marist had won the Roope Rooster. A week later Mount Albert beat Marist 15–9 to win the Stormont Shield (champion of champions) for the first time. City Rovers won the Phelan Shield when they beat Richmond Rovers 15–12 in the final. This was the first time they had won the Phelan Shield which was played for by teams knocked out of the Roope Rooster in the first two rounds.

Richmond won the reserve grade competition ahead of Mount Albert and Ponsonby United. They also won the reserve grade knockout competition (Stallard Cup) when they beat Otahuhu Rovers in the final. Otahuhu had competed in the senior B grade but asked to compete for the Stallard Cup after they had won the senior B championship (Sharman Cup). Otahuhu also won the senior B knockout competition beating Ellerslie United 5–3 in the final. Ellerslie claimed the Foster Shield.

The representative season to an extent was focussed on helping the selectors choose the New Zealand team to tour England and France. Auckland played matches against South Auckland and Wellington while the traditional Inter-Island match was also played at Carlaw Park. Two New Zealand trial matches were played at the same venue and were heavily populated by Auckland players. The Tāmaki (Auckland Māori) side played 2 matches against Auckland Pākehā with the sides splitting them, one win a piece. On June 11, the Māori side played South Auckland in Huntly with the South Auckland team winning. They also played the first ever Bay of Plenty Māori side for the Waitangi Shield with the teams deadlocked 3–3 at full time. Another Waitangi Shield defence was scheduled for August 31 but was postponed due to bad weather. It was then cancelled altogether because of petrol restrictions due to the looming outbreak of war meaning the Taranaki Māori side couldn't get a license to travel. At the start of the season, an Eastern Suburbs side (though with several players from other clubs) visited Auckland and played 4 matches against Auckland club sides. They beat Marist (22–9), lost to Richmond (16–17), lost to Mount Albert (11–16), and then beat Manukau (23–10).

Preceded by 1938	31st Auckland Rugby League season 1939	Succeeded by 1940

== Auckland Rugby League news ==
=== Club teams by grade participation ===
There were 103 club teams across 10 grades in the 1938 season. Newmarket initially had a team in the 3rd Grade but after they suffered several heavy defeats they were transferred into the 4th Grade so they have been credited with a 4th Grade team and not a 3rd Grade team as it was effectively the same side.

Team	Fox Memorial	Senior Reserve	Senior B	3rd	4th	5th	6th	7th	Schoolboys	Total
Richmond Rovers	1	1	0	1	1	1	1	1	2	9
Manukau	1	1	0	1	1	0	1	0	2	7
North Shore Albions	1	1	0	1	1	0	1	0	2	7
Mount Albert United	1	1	0	1	1	0	1	0	2	7
City Rovers	1	1	0	2	1	0	1	1	0	7
Papakura	1	1	0	1	1	1	0	1	0	6
Ponsonby United	1	1	0	1	1	0	0	1	1	6
Northcote & Birkenhead Ramblers	0	0	1	1	1	0	0	1	2	6
Ellerslie United	0	0	1	1	0	1	1	0	2	6
Point Chevalier	0	0	1	1	0	1	0	1	2	6
Otahuhu Rovers	0	0	1	1	1	0	1	0	2	6
Newton Rangers	1	1	0	1	0	0	0	0	2	5
Newmarket	0	0	0	0	1	1	0	0	2	4
Marist Old Boys	1	1	0	1	0	1	0	0	0	4
Avondale	0	0	0	1	0	1	0	0	2	4
R.V.	0	0	1	1	1	0	0	0	0	3
Green Lane	0	0	1	0	1	0	0	0	1	3
Glenora	0	0	0	1	0	1	0	0	1	3
St Patricks School	0	0	0	0	0	0	0	0	2	2
Total	9	9	6	17	12	9	7	6	27	103

=== Annual meeting ===
The report presented at the annual meeting on March 8 stated: "there was again a marked increase in revenue from gate and grandstand receipts and ground rates, the respective figures being: 1937, £3410; 1938, £3761 18s 5d [with] the tour of the Sydney Eastern Suburbs team [being] a material factor in this increase. There had been an increase in expenditure from £160 to £312 due to the increased length of the season, more travel, and more insurance payments to cover injured players hospital treatment. The surplus for the season to be transferred to the appropriation account was £1439". Grants to clubs had amounted to £628 4s 7d. Mention was also made of the loss of several “notable stalwarts, including the late Messrs. Charles Seagar, William James Liversidge, T. Bellamy, and R. Badiley”. The annual meeting was held on March 8 with Mr. John A. Lee, M.P. presiding. He said that “the code was steadily progressing so far as the quality of players and public esteem were concerned”. Ivan Culpan was congratulated on reaching his twenty-first year in office. Mr. G. Grey Campbell referred to the generosity of vice-president, Mr. R.H. Wood who had presented “the handsome Edith Wood Roll of Honour for the inscription of the names of men who had given 25 years of continuous special service. The gift was dedicated to the memory of the donor's wife. The memorial was draped with the flags of all the clubs”. Election of officers were as follows:-Patron Mr. J.F.W. Dickson; president, Mr. John A. Lee, M.P.; vice-presidents, Sir Ernest Davis, Messrs. J. Donald, C. Drysdale, H. Grange, R.J. Land, W.J. Lovatt, E. Morton, Frederick William Schramm, M.P., W. Wallace, W.H. Brien, L. Coakly, H. Luke, R.D. Bagnall, O. Blackwood, E. Montgomery, T.G. Symonds, G.T. Wright, R.H. Benson, auditors being Messrs. Allan Moody, E. Grey and J.C. Gleeson; trustees, Messrs. G. Grey Campbell (chairman) and E.J. Phelan and A. Stormont; control board, Messrs. G. Grey Campbell (chairman), E.J. Phelan (deputy), John F. McAneny, T. Davis, J.W. Probert and Jim Rukutai (re-elected by clubs), William Mincham (Referees’ Association), D. Wilkie (chairman junior management), R. Doble (delegate to New Zealand Council), Mr. Ivan Culpan (hon. secretary) and Mr. J.E. Knowling (hon. treasurer); auditor, Mr. Robert Arthur Spinley; solicitor, Mr. H.M. Rogerson; time keepers, Messrs. T. Hill and A.E. Chapman; representatives n referees appointment board, Messrs. R. Benson with T. Davis as deputy; appointment board, Messrs. Percy Rogers, R. Benson and G. Grey Campbell; committees were allocated the same as last year; hon physicians, Drs. F.J. Gwynne, H.N. Holdgate, S. Morris, G.W. Lock, J.N. Waddell, M.G. Pezaro, H. Burrell and W. Bridgman. Following R. Doble's July appointment as co-manager of the New Zealand team to tour England and France a reshuffle was needed of officials at Auckland Rugby League. Mr. Francis Thomas McAneny was asked to deputise on the New Zealand Council pending a permanent appointment. Mr. E. Chapman was chosen as Press and call steward at Carlaw Park and Mr. Probert was elected to the insurance committee.

=== Junior Control Board ===
Their annual report from the 1938 season stated that 55 teams took part in junior competitions with 1123 players registered. The ladies social committee “paid over 200 visits to the sick and needy” with many players expressing their “thanks for their generosity and kindness”. The ladies committee also managed all the social functions of the control board. In 1937 club delegates had formed the Amalgamated Senior Clubs' Officers Association and through their efforts £300 had been contributed to help players in need.

=== Honours board ===
At the control board meeting on February 15 “consideration was given to the list of names to be inscribed on the honours’ board, which will be a record of those who have given 25 years of continuous service to the code in Auckland". At their March 1 meeting chairman Campbell “stated that the roll of honour ... would be unveiled at the annual meeting” the following week. At the annual meeting on March 8 the memorial was unveiled with the names being D.W. Mclean, founder of the New Zealand Rugby League, and James Carlaw (deceased), Messrs. Ernie Asher, R.H. Benson, A.J. Ferguson, Ivan Culpan, B Longbottom, C. Raynes, A. Campney, Freeman Thompson, W.J. Liversidge, W. Mincham, and M.J. Hooper. Chairman Campbell said that other names were to be added. On August 7 Mr. W. Mincham reported that the name of Mr. Les Edgar Bull was being added to the Roll of Honour board. He was the association president and had been a key figure in Auckland refereeing for many years.

=== Pre-season ===
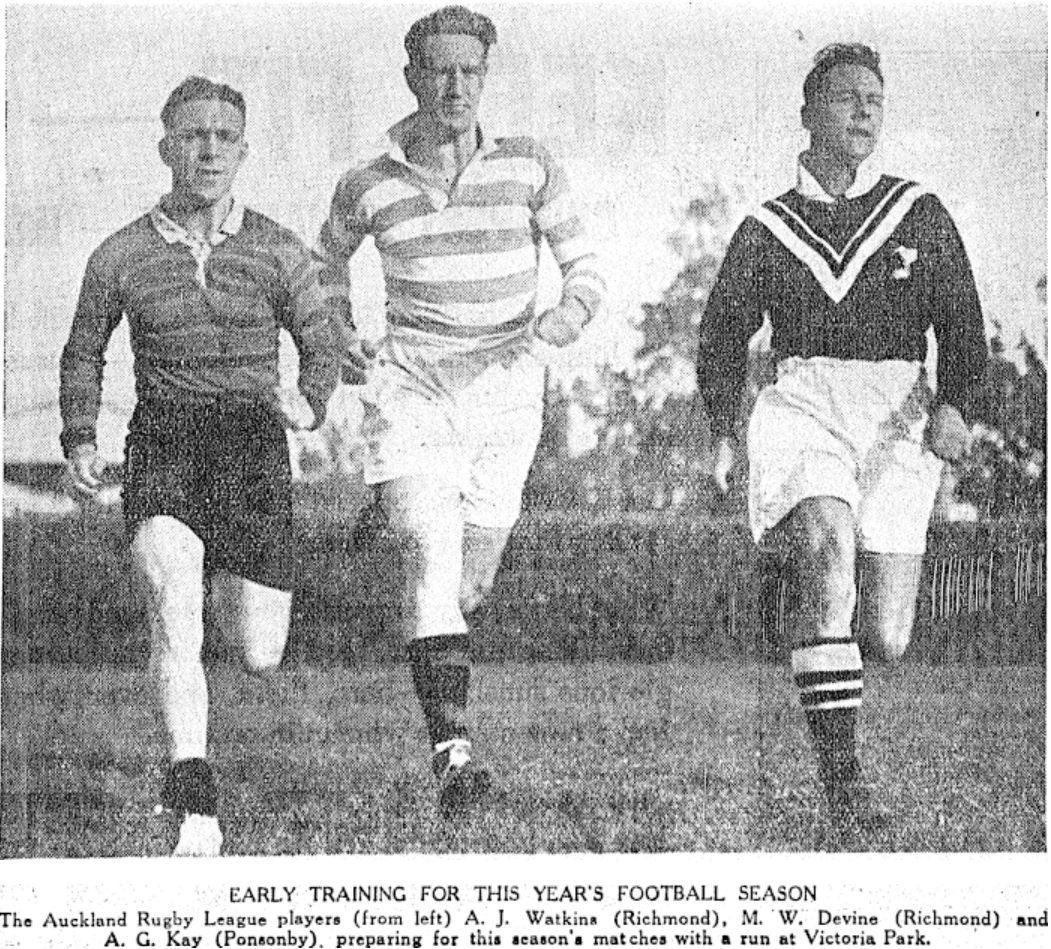
Alan Watkins (Mt Albert), Merv Devine (Richmond), and Arthur Kay (Ponsonby) training in pre-season.

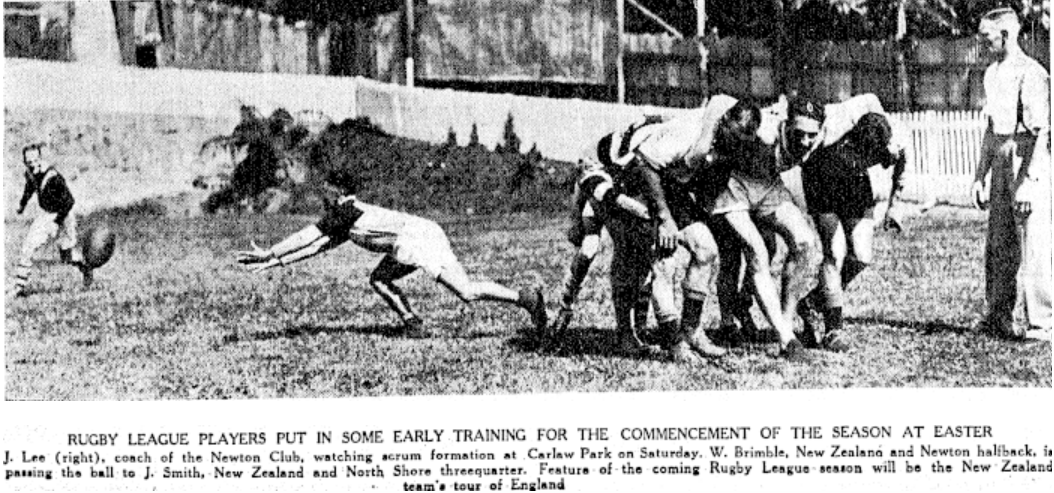
Mixed club preseason training on the number 2 field at Carlaw Park. Wilfred Brimble (Newton) passing from a scrum with Jack Smith (North Shore) in the background.

At the board of control meeting on February 22 it was decided to notify clubs that Carlaw Park “would be available for regular training after next Saturday and to engage a coach to attend the park to conduct free physical culture and loosening exercises for players from 7:30 pm to 8pm tonight week and the following Tuesday and Thursday evenings” with “his services open to all players”. At the same meeting the board congratulated Verdun Scott of the North Shore Albions who had scored a record 235 not out recently in club cricket.

=== Sydney combined side tour ===
It was organised that the Balmain club would tour Auckland playing three matches over the Easter weekend before returning to Australia to begin their season. A week later however the club informed the authorities in New Zealand that they would not be able to come as "several players were not available". The Auckland Rugby League then engaged in a “lengthy radio-telephone conversation with Australia” on February 15 that left them “practically certain that one of the leading club teams of Sydney will play at Carlaw Park at Easter in lieu of Balmain”. Ray Stehr of Eastern Suburbs had also been reported as saying that he could get together a very strong composite team made up of Eastern Suburbs and Balmain players to tour. The team was eventually granted permission to tour and four matches were arranged for Carlaw Park against Marist, Richmond, Mount Albert, and Manukau. The touring side was particularly strong and included good players from several clubs: Jim Sharman, Jack Rubinson (W. Suburbs), Frank Hyde, Jim Quealey, Jack Redman, Frank Griffiths, George Watt (Balmain), Roy Thompson (N. Sydney), Don Manson (S. Sydney), Aub Mitchell (Canterbury-Bankstown), Fred Tottey, Rod O'Loan, Laurie Pickup, Jack McCarthy, Jack Arnold, Harry Pierce, and Ray Stehr (E. Suburbs). The tour raised £300 for the injured players fund.

==== Marist v Sydney XIII ====
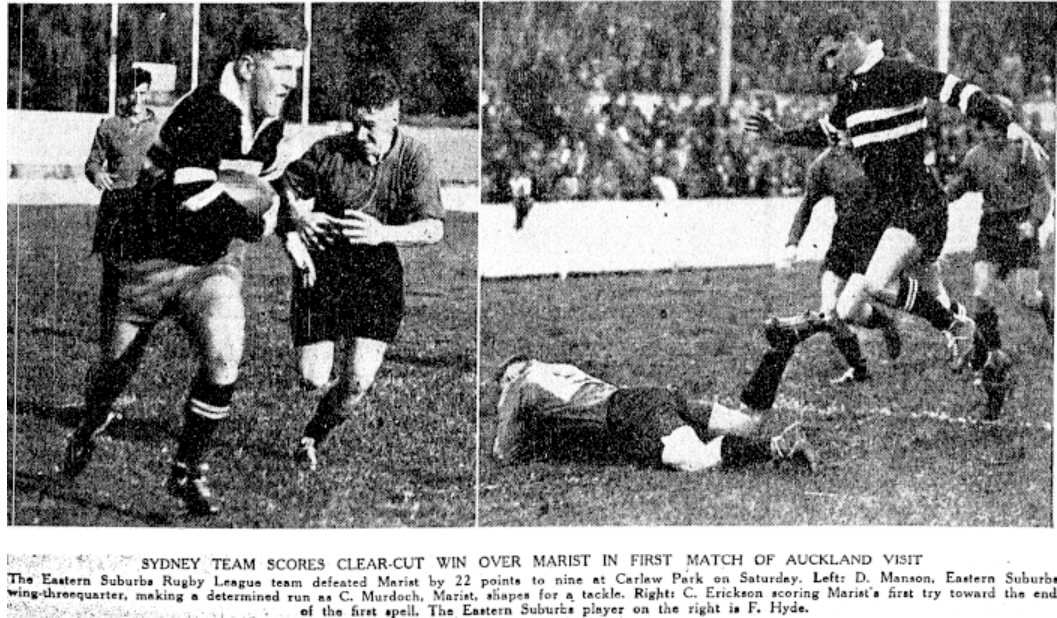
Don Manson being chased by Clive Murdoch in the left picture, and Cyril Erickson scoring for Marist with Frank Hyde arriving too late.

Before the kickoff of the first match between Marist and Sydney XIII both teams stood in silence and wore arm bands as a mark of respect for the late Prime Minister of Australia, Mr. Joseph Lyons who had died in office 13 days earlier on April 7. Robert Grotte was sent off for Marist and was later suspended for 2 games. John Anderson, normally one of the most reliable place kickers in New Zealand missed 5 first half shots at goal and another in the second half, while Murdoch also missed one. Early in the second half Billy Grotte, a Marist forward was ordered off by referee George Kelly leaving them a man short for the remainder of the game.

8 April	Marist	9-22 (6-7)	Sydney XIII	Carlaw Park 1
3:00	Try: Cyril Erickson, Phil Donovan, John Anderson		Try: Aub Mitchell, Jack Redman 2, Jack Arnold; Con: Roy Thompson 3 Pen: Roy Thompson 2	Referee: George Kelly

==== Richmond v Sydney XIII ====
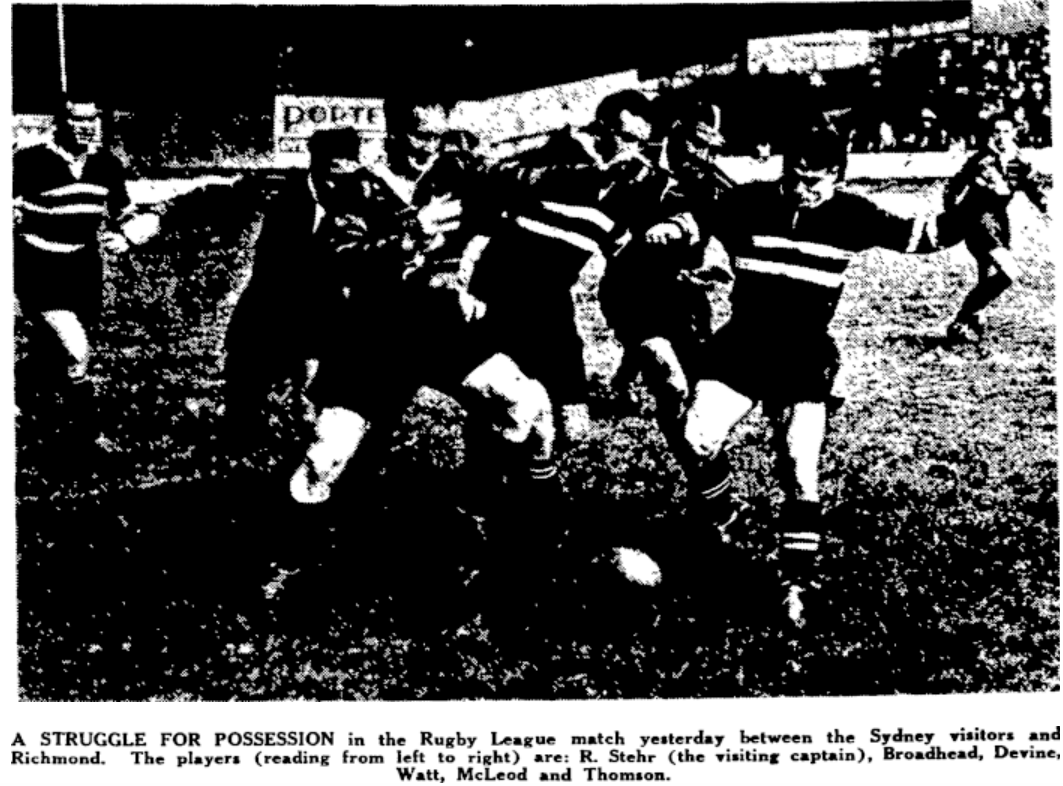
Players from both teams competing for the ball. They include Ray Stehr, Alf Broadhead, Merv Devine, George Watt, Jack McLeod, and Roy Thompson.

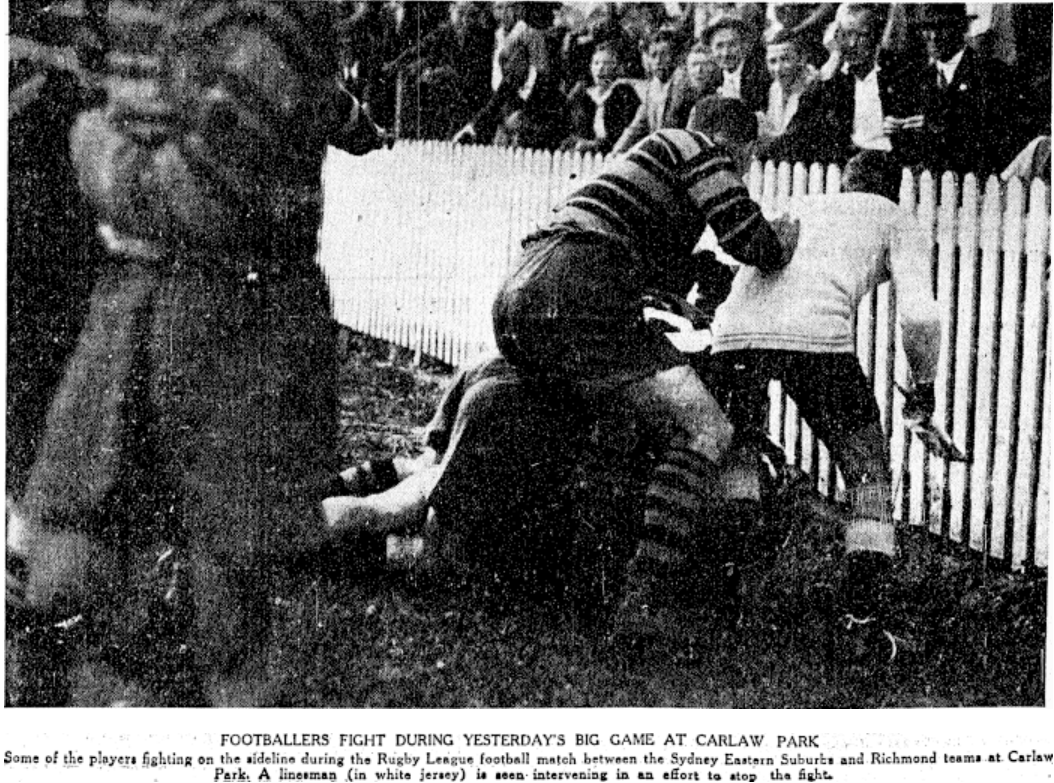
A fight between players which has gone over the sideline up against the grandstand.

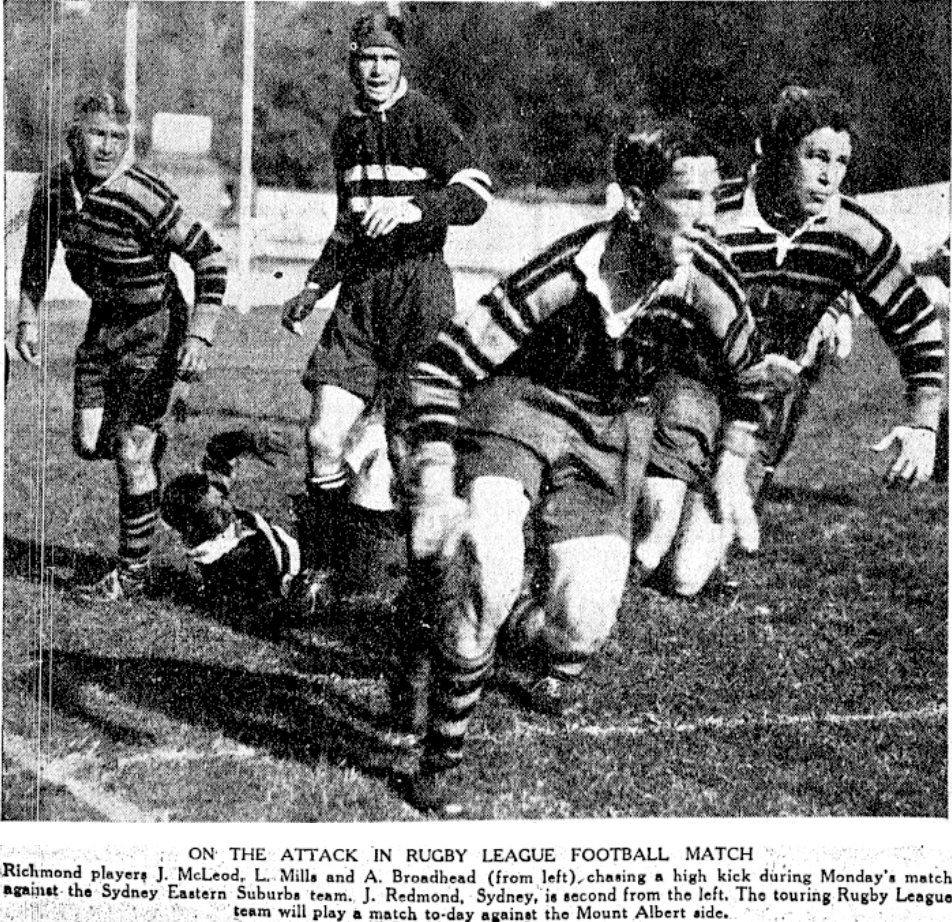
Laurie Mills leading the chase for Richmond with Jack McLeod and Alf Broadhead in close support. The Sydney player is Jack Redmond.

Richmond's amazing record against touring teams from Australia in the 1930s continued with a 17–16 victory. Halfway through the second half a large fight broke out involving most players and which lasted for a full minute. As it was up against the grandstand fence some spectators jumped over and joined in the effort to separate the players. There had been a "series of rough incidents which occurred throughout the game. Several times the referee had stopped play to issue warnings to players who appeared to be adopting illegal tactics". For Richmond George Mitchell scored two tries while Merv Devine scored a try and kicked a conversion and a penalty. For the Sydney side Jim Quealey and Fred Tottey had been brought into the side and Quealey scored one try and Tottey, two. The hard ground was said to have been responsible for several injuries. Alf Broadhead had to leave the field injured early in the second half for Richmond but was able to come back on 15 minutes later. After the game their halfback, Alan Watkins was taken by ambulance to Auckland suffering from concussion. A relay race was run during the afternoon between 4 senior club teams including the Sydney side. The Ponsonby team won by 2 yards ahead of Sydney with Brian Riley, Arthur Kay, Jack Campbell, and Pat Young running for the winners.

10 April	Richmond	17-16 (7-3)	Sydney XIII	Carlaw Park 1
3:00	Try: George Mitchell 2, Merv Devine; Con: Merv Devine, Frank Furnell 2 Pen: Merv Devine		Try: Jim Quealey, Jack Redmond, Fred Tottey 2 Con: Roy Thompson 2	Referee: Stuart Billman

==== Mount Albert v Sydney XIII ====
12 April	Mount Albert	16-11	Sydney XIII	Carlaw Park 1
3:15	Try: Des Herring, Roy Hardgrave; Con: Des Herring, Bob Banham; Pen: Des Herring, Bob Banham 2		Try: Rod O'Loan, George Watt, Laurie Pickup; Pen: Jim Quealey	Referee: Stuart Billman

==== Manukau v Sydney XIII ====
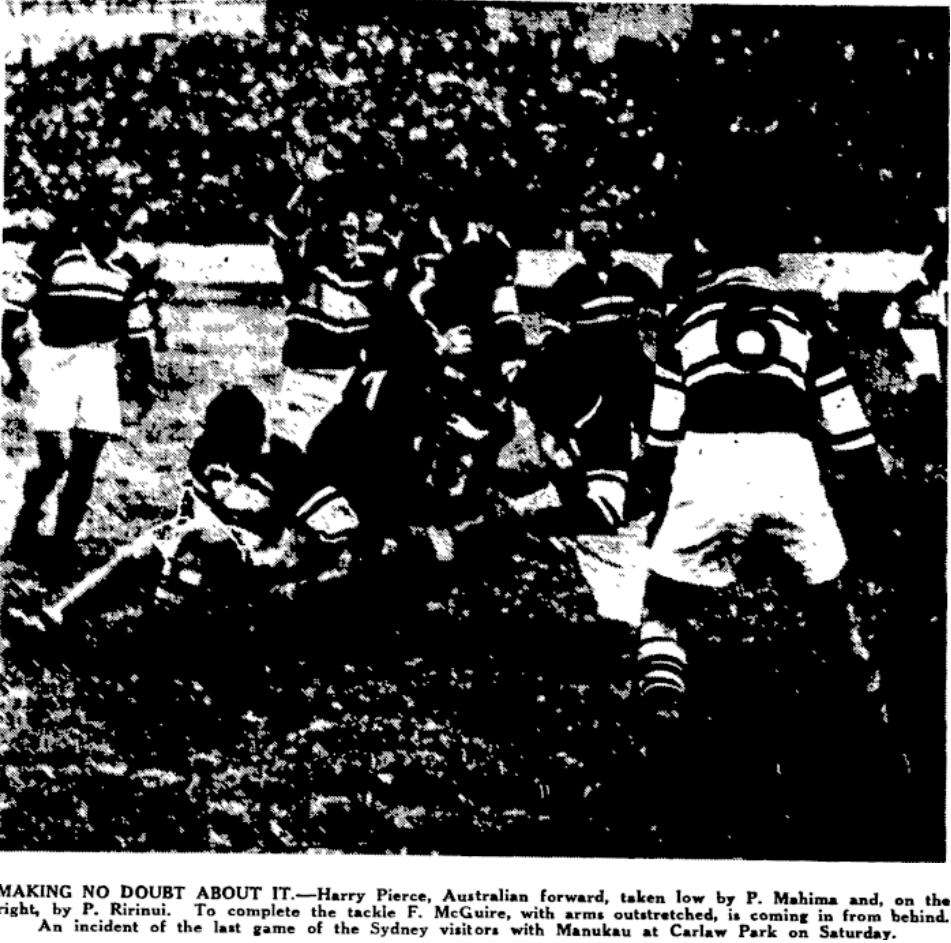
Harry Pierce being tackled by Peter Mahima and Pita Ririnui.

15 April	Manukau	10-23 (3-15)	Sydney XIII	Carlaw Park 1
3:15	Try: George (Tiki) Whye, Cyril Wiberg; Con: Jack Hemi; Pen: Jack Hemi		Try: Fred Tottey 3, Roy Thompson, Rod O'Loan; Con: Roy Thompson 4	Referee: Stuart Billman

=== Harold Milliken, Dave Solomon and Bruce Donaldson switch codes ===
It was reported on March 21 that Harold Milliken, an All Black in 1937-38 was moving from Christchurch to Auckland and would play for the Papakura club. At the same time the Auckland rugby representative five eighth, Bruce Donaldson also switched codes and joined the Mount Albert side. He ultimately topped the point scoring for the season with 117 points. On May 20 Dave Solomon who had played for the All Blacks in 1935-36 switched to rugby league and joined Richmond. He debuted for them in their May 20 match with Papakura.

=== Return of Bob Banham, George Nepia, and Hawea Mataira ===
Bob Banham the Australian who had been recruited by Auckland Rugby League in 1938 as a player-coach was returning to Auckland for the 1939 season. The previous year he had played and coached at North Shore Albions (5 games), and City Rovers (12 games), with 2 other appearances for Newton Rangers as a guest. Mount Albert United had secured his services as a player coach. Hawea Mataira, who had played for City Rovers in 1937 before returning to the East Coast for 1938 was once again back in Auckland and playing for his former side. George Nepia had also returned to Auckland to play for Manukau Rovers. He had played for them briefly in 1938 before leaving for Gisborne after he pulled out of the New Zealand team to tour Australia for personal reasons. He was joining Manukau as a player-coach.

=== Newmarket Rugby League Football Club revival ===
On February 6 a special meeting was held at the Municipal Hall for the Newmarket Rugby League Football Club and they were “revived” as a result. The mayor of Newmarket was presiding over the meeting. The Auckland Rugby League granted them affiliation as a junior club. The club had last fielded junior teams in 1931 when they won the 6th grade A competition, after starting out with a solitary schoolboys side in 1926.

=== Carlaw Park ===
Improvements were made to the Carlaw Park entrance gates with the work completed by May 6 at a cost of £200. Work was also intended to be carried out on the “eastern end of the grandstand, to prevent rain beating in”.

=== Obituaries ===
==== William James Barningham Liversidge ====
On December 26, 1938, William Liversidge had a heart attack and died in the pavilion of the Auckland Bowling Club whilst competing in a bowls tournament. He was aged just 50 at the time of his death. Liversidge was a member of the Men's fours national champions in 1935 from the Grey Lynn club along with Auckland referee and father of Ted Mincham, William Mincham. He had been involved in Auckland rugby league "since its inception" and was a life member of the Auckland Rugby League. He had also been on the committee of the Maritime Football Club from 1919 onwards. At the Auckland control board meeting on February 2 chairman Campbell said that "Mr Liversidge was a progressive administrator of ability and for many years had served the game well, giving keen support to the Auckland League as well as to the national management". Liversidge was an employee of the waterworks department of the City Council. He was buried at Waikumete Cemetery on the 28th.

=== Representative season ===
At the control board meeting on March 15 there were four nominations for the three positions of Auckland selectors. As the result of a ballot Messrs. Hec Brisbane, Bert Avery, and Bill Cloke were elected. Auckland played two matches, the first against South Auckland (Waikato) on August 5 resulting in a 26–17 win while they defeated Wellington 23–9 on September 2. An Auckland Pākehā side played the Tamaki (Auckland Māori) side on two occasions with the Māori side winning the first 19-15 (June 5), and the Pākehā side the second 15-12 (September 30). The Māori side also played a Bay of Plenty Māori team on August 24 with the match drawn 3-3. Other matches were played by Māori teams against South Auckland sides but the results were not well reported. They were also scheduled to play against the Taranaki Māori side but the match was postponed due to the weather and then cancelled due to government imposed petrol restrictions with war looming. the annual inter-island match between the North Island and South Island was also played at Carlaw Park and was won 35–13 by the North Island which was dominated by Auckland players as was the norm. There were also 2 New Zealand trial matches played at Carlaw Park again featuring a large number of Auckland players.

=== Auckland players chosen for New Zealand tour of England and France ===
In July the New Zealand team to tour England and France was named in 3 stages. The following players from Auckland were selected:- Bob Banham (Mount Albert), Tommy Chase (Manukau), Jack Hemi (Manukau), Ross Jones (North Shore), Arthur Kay, Bert Leatherbarrow, Hawea Mataira (City), Arthur McInnarney (Mount Albert), George Mitchell (Richmond), Harold Milliken (Papakura), Laurie Mills (Richmond), Pita Ririnui (Manukau), Verdun Scott (North Shore), Jack Smith (North Shore), Dave Solomon (Richmond), Ivor Stirling (North Shore), Wally Tittleton (Richmond). The Auckland Rugby League chairman, Mr. G. Grey Campbell was appointed co-manager for the tour, along with Mr. J.A. Redwood. On July 15 a complimentary dinner was held at Hotel Auckland in the evening to farewell the managers and Auckland players selected. The team was toasted by Mr. John A. Lee, M.P., and replied to by Bob Banham and Hawea Mataira. Each of “the Auckland players was presented with a travelling case on behalf” of Auckland Rugby League. Campbell withdrew as co-manager on July 23 following several medical checks on his health. He “had recently had a severe attack of influenza, and the doctors were unanimously of the opinion that it would not be in the best interests of his health to undertake such a strenuous tour at the present time” He was replaced as co-manager by Mr. R. Doble who was the Auckland delegate to the New Zealand Rugby League Council.

On July 22 at Carlaw Park during the afternoon of regular club matches the Auckland players were farewelled by all the junior teams. The schoolboys marched in their playing gear and “formed huge letters N.Z. in the background”. Members of the New Zealand team “assembled in front of the grandstand and a loud speaker system was used to carry the farewell messages of a dozen speakers”. The New Zealand Herald reported that “a feature of the occasion was the dedication in Māori of the New Zealand ensign and the ceremony was carried out by Mr. T.P. Kewene, on behalf of the Māori Control Board. The address was interpreted by Mr. Paraire Karaka Paikea, M.P. for the Northern Māori district, as an incantation of guidance and blessing to the team when abroad. Presentations were made to Verdun Scott, Arthur McInnarney and Laurie Mills by Mr. R. Newport on behalf of the Schoolboys’ Association for being the first ever products of the Auckland Rugby League school grades to “earn national honours with a team going overseas”. The ceremony concluded with Mr. John A. Lee, M.P., president of the ARL leading singing of “For They Are Jolly Good Fellows”, and George Nēpia and other Māori players singing “Till We Meet Again”.

== Senior first grade competitions ==
=== Fox Memorial standings ===
Team	Pld	W	D	L	F	A	Pts
Mount Albert United	16	13	1	2	284	165	27
North Shore Albions	16	10	1	5	196	153	21
Newton Rangers	16	9	1	6	188	126	19
Manukau	16	7	1	8	240	244	15
Ponsonby United	15	7	1	7	176	204	15
Richmond Rovers	15	7	0	8	171	174	14
City Rovers	16	5	3	8	137	188	13
Marist Old Boys	16	6	0	10	189	126	12
Papakura	16	2	2	12	132	256	6

=== Fox Memorial results ===
==== Round 1 ====
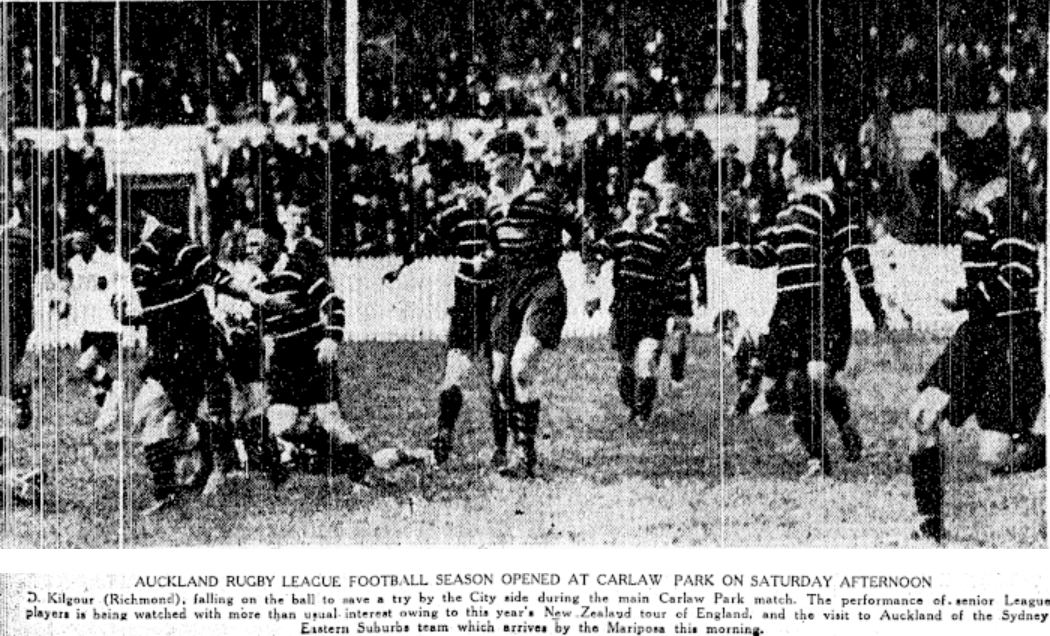

Hawea Mataira returned to rugby league after spending a year in Tokomaru Bay on the East Coast. He was joined in the City side by fullback William Greer who had played for Canterbury at rugby. Greer's Sunnyside rugby club teammate had also moved to Auckland, namely Harold Milliken who played seven games for the All Blacks on their 1938 tour of Australia. Milliken had joined the Papakura club and debuted in their game with Mt Albert. He was selected for the New Zealand team later in the year to tour England. It had been reported that Reginald Haslam, the brilliant centre for Marist had "definitely retired" but he turned out for them once more "and led the green backs in fine style". Graham Simpson scored two tries for Ponsonby on debut at centre. He was an ex-Manawatu rugby representative. Jack Taylor, a former Kamo breakaway forward debuted for Newton in that position.

1 April	Richmond	15-14 (5-9)	City	Carlaw Park 1
3:00	Try: George Mitchell, Laurie Mills 2 Con: Merv Devine 3		Try: J Hutchinson, Hawea Mataira; Con: William Greer 2 Pen: William Greer 2	Referee: Stuart Billman

1 April	Mount Albert	24-10	Papakura	Carlaw Park 1
1:30	Try: Ivan Wilson 2, Bruce Donaldson 2, Roy Hardgrave, Arthur McInnarney; Con: Des Herring 2 Pen: Colin Cowley		Pen: W Cooke 5	Referee: G Kelly

1 April	Ponsonby	29-22 (9-9)	Manukau	Carlaw Park 2
3:00	Try: Huck Flanagan, Brian Riley, Arthur Kay 2, Graham Simpson 2, Jack Campbell; Con: Arthur Kay 3 Pen: Arthur Kay		Try: Joe Broughton, Jack Brodrick, J Hapi, J Marsh; Con: Tommy Chase 2 Pen: Tommy Chase 3	Referee: Owen Chalmers

1 April	Marist	13-5 (5-3)	Newton	Carlaw Park 2
1:30	Try: John Anderson, Gordon Midgley, Robert Grotte; Con: John Anderson; Pen: John Anderson		Try: Cyril Blacklaws; Pen: Wilfred Brimble	Referee: A Kinnaird

==== Round 2 ====
Manukau played against the touring Eastern Suburbs side at 3pm on the number 1 field with just 3 senior club matches played. In the Ponsonby v North Shore match the New Zealand Herald reported that Jack Campbell scored 2 tries however the Auckland Star said that he scored one and Simpson scored the other. The New Zealand Herald had a slightly more detailed description of the match and so Campbell has been attributed with both tries. For North Shore Jack Smith kicked four penalties and three conversions. In the Ponsonby backline Arthur Kay "was brilliant at times, but his good play was nullified by bad errors". The game between Mt Albert and Newton was even until brilliant play by Bob Banham won Mt Albert the game. He beat four Newton players "cleverly passing to Tristram, who gave Mt Albert the winning try". Walter Alfred Cameron debuted for Mt Albert after crossing the Tasman. He had played eight games for the South Sydney for their first grade side from 1935 to 1937 before joining the Queanbeyan side in 1938. He came across with Bob Banham and would just play one season before returning to Queanbeyan in 1940, Mt Kembla 1941–44, and Woolongong in 1945. William Greer kicked outstandingly for City, scoring 12 points from five penalties and a conversion. Harold Milliken was "very solid, although not brilliant amount the Papakura forwards. While Hawea Mataira "was outstanding" for City. On the wing for City was a 17 year old, Jim Gould who showed "plenty of speed and determination".

15 April	Mount Albert	11-9	Newton	Carlaw Park 1
1:30	Try: Bert Leatherbarrow, Roy Hardgrave, Jack Tristram; Pen: Des Herring		Try: Mortimer Stephens; Pen: Wilfred Brimble 2, Cyril Blacklaws	Referee: Jack Hawkes

15 April	City	24-7	Papakura	Carlaw Park 2
3:00	Try: Hawea Mataira, A Smith, Jackie Rata, Bill Jackson; Con: William Greer; Pen: William Greer 5		Try: Benny Crocker 2 Pen: J McInnes 2	Referee: G Kelly

15 April	North Shore	26-8	Ponsonby	Carlaw Park 2
1:30	Try: Casey 2, Morgan, Ivor Stirling; Con: Jack Smith 4 Pen: Jack Smith 3		Try: Jack Campbell 2 Pen: J Fraser	Referee: A Kinnaird

==== Round 3 ====
Several Richmond players were suffering from influenza and Roy Powell made a reappearance at halfback for them. Alan Watkins played at standoff but struggled and switched with J Greenwood at halftime who had been outside him. Potter played poorly in the centre position and the wings got no chances as a result. For Marist, long time centre, Reginald Haslam played in the forwards.

22 April	North Shore	7-0	Richmond	Carlaw Park 1
3:00	Try: Morgan; Con: Verdun Scott; Pen: Jack Smith			Referee: George Kelly

22 April	City	4-3	Marist	Carlaw Park 1
1:30	Pen: William Greer; Drop: William Greer		Try: Cyril Erickson	Referee: Ted Mincham

22 April	Ponsonby	10-6	Newton	Carlaw Park 2
3:00	Try: Jack Campbell, Edgar Morgan; Con: Roy Nurse 2		Pen: Wilfred Brimble 3	Referee: Owen Chalmers

22 April	Manukau	20-0	Papakura	Carlaw Park 2
1:30	Try: Peter Mahima 2, Tommy Chase, Mihaka Panapa; Con: Jack Hemi 3 Drop: George Nēpia			Referee: Stuart Billman

==== Round 4 ====
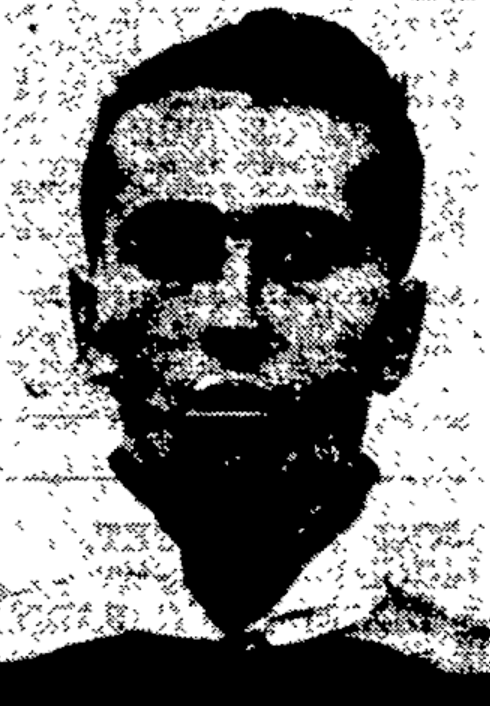
Bruce Donaldson who was in brilliant form for Mt Albert at second five-eighth.

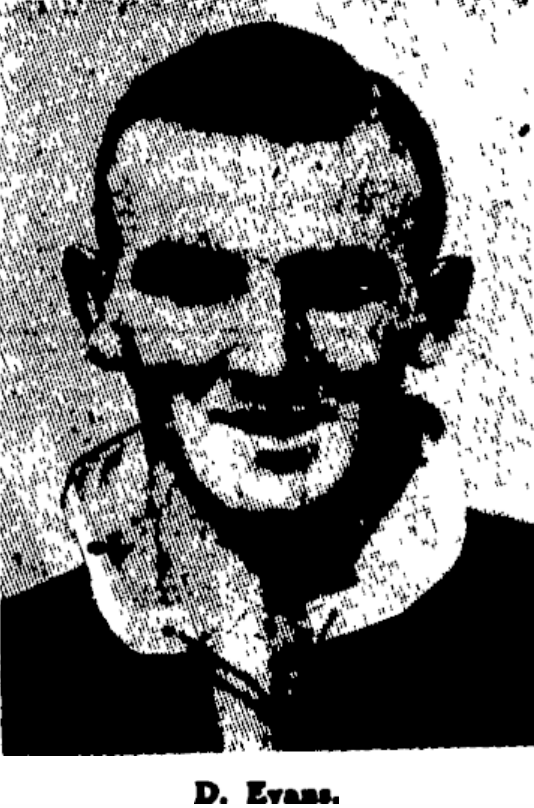
Dennis Evans, Papakura forward.

Papakura had their first win of the season beating a Marist side that was missing six of its regular players due to influenza. For Papakura, forward Dennis Evans was their best player, he "was always up with the play, and an indefatigable worker in both tight and loose" and he scored three of their four tries. For Marist their "remnants of the regulars" Ray Halsey, Jimmy Matthews, and Phil Donovan in the backs, and Ken Finlayson and Billy Grotte in the forwards led the rest well. Manukau had a big win over North Shore with George Nēpia solid at fullback with Jack Hemi also good at centre. Tommy Chase was moved from wing to second five eighth during the game and excelled in that position. In their forwards the 23 year old 14st 5lb forward, Waka McLeod "made a promising debut". He had played representative rugby union for Wanganui in 1935, and then for Bay of Plenty in 1937 and 1938. A former team mate of his at Rangataua and Tauranga, Pita Ririnui also played well in the Manukau forwards, though it was Jack Brodrick who was "again the most outstanding forward and in the loose play was brilliant". For North Shore their young forward, Ross Jones who was in his second year of senior league was said to be playing the best football of any forward in Auckland.

29 April	Manukau	23-7	North Shore	Carlaw Park 1
3:00	Try: Tommy Chase 2, Jack Brodrick 2, Cyril Wiberg; Con: Jack Hemi 3 Pen: Jack Hemi		Try: Ivor Stirling; Con: Jack Smith; Pen: Jack Smith	Referee: Owen Chalmers

29 April	Mount Albert	9-0	Richmond	Carlaw Park 1
1:30	Try: W Walker; Pen: Bruce Donaldson 3			Referee: A Kinnaird

29 April	City	8-5	Newton	Carlaw Park 2
3:00	Try: Joseph Hapi, Claude Kindley; Pen: Jackie Rata		Try: Linley Sanders; Pen: Wilfred Brimble	Referee: Stuart Billman

29 April	Papakura	12-7	Marist	Carlaw Park 2
1:30	Try: Dennis Evans 3, Craig Smith		Try: Ray Halsey; Pen: Billy Grotte 2	Referee: H Tate

==== Round 5 ====
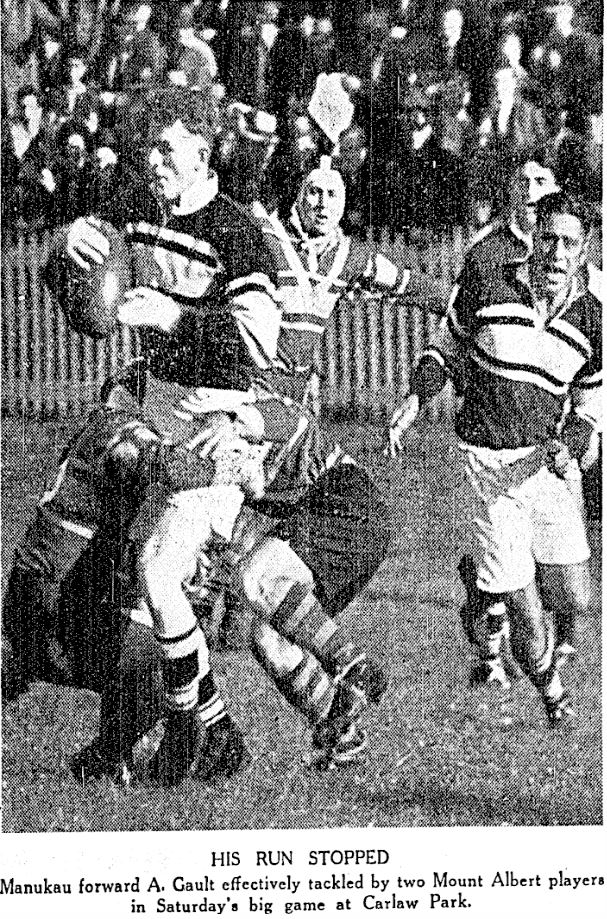
Angus Gault playing for Manukau against Mt Albert with Tommy Chase in support.

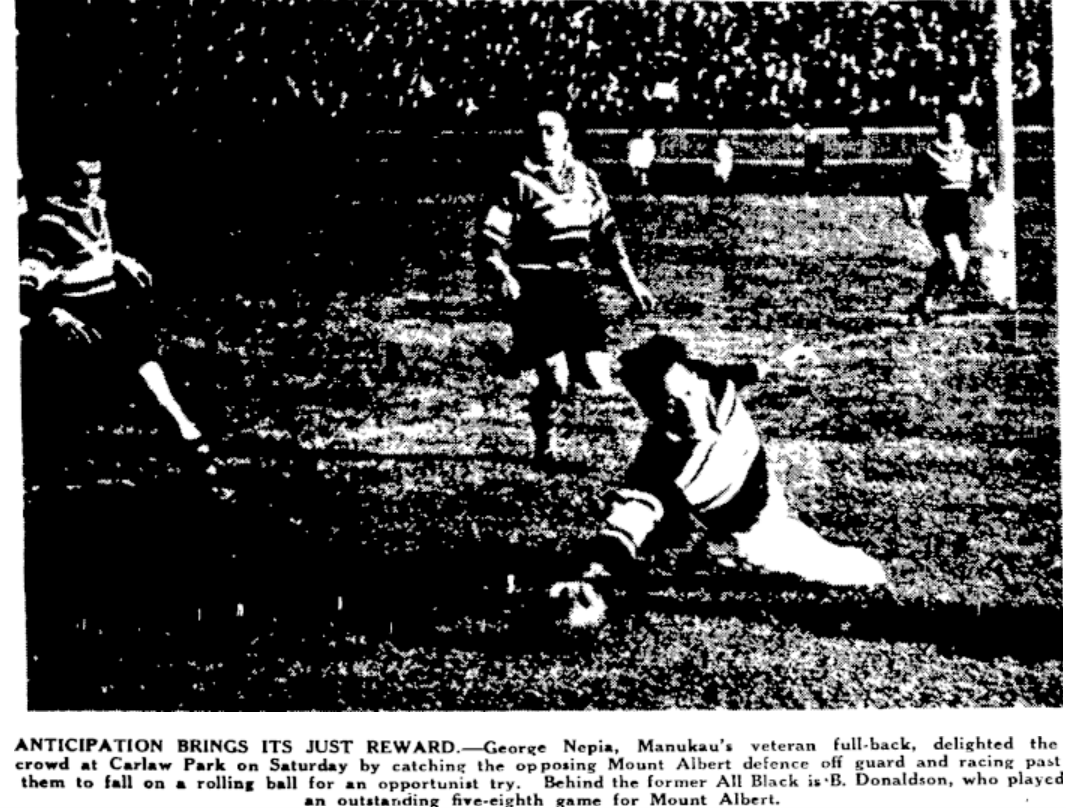
George Nēpia scoring after following up his own kick which bounced past defenders into the in goal

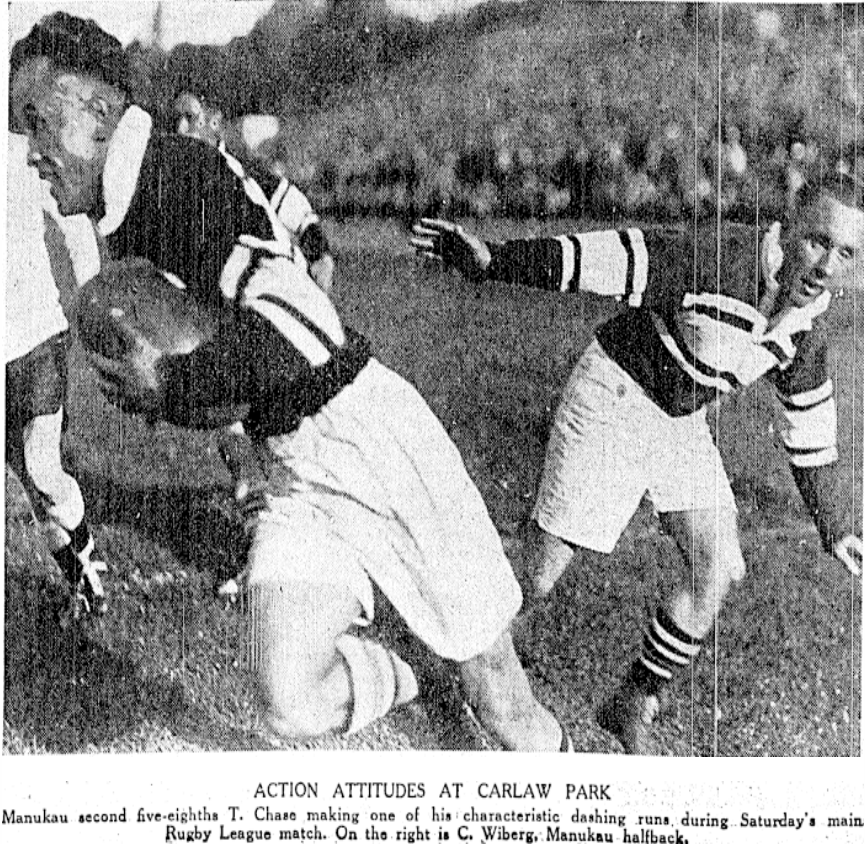
Tommy Chase running with halfback Cyril Wiberg behind.

In the match between Newton and Papakura, Harold Milliken was sent off. The match was said to be marred by rough play and “the referee appeared to treat the incidents too lightly”. It was said that deliberate “spotting” of prominent players “should not be tolerated. In this respect H. Milliken, who was ordered off, must be considered unlucky, as he was badly obstructed on several occasions”. For Papakura their captain John Fogarty left the field injured after being "in everything that was going" before that. For Newton, veteran Claude Dempsey was "excellent" once more "handling well and frequently finding the gap". Ted Brimble and his younger brother Wilfred Brimble combined well in the inside backs though Wilfred had to go off injured during the first half and Ted moved into halfback and kept the backs moving well. While Linley Sanders and H Kendall ran hard when they got the ball. George Nepia scored an opportunist try for Manukau in their loss to Mt Albert which was photographed. The match was full of current and future New Zealand team players such as Angus Gault, Walter Brimble, Tommy Chase, George Nēpia, Pita Ririnui, Jack Brodrick, and Jack Hemi of Manukau, and Des Herring, Arthur McInnarney, Roy Hardgrave, Bob Banham, and Bert Leatherbarrow of Mt Albert. The Mt Albert side showed that they were the form team in the competition by running in eight tries including two to centre Robert Marshall, and three to prop Des Herring, while five eighth Bruce Donaldson scored a try and kicked seven goals for 17 personal points. Walter Brimble made his first appearance for Manukau of the season though he "was not up to his best form" while Cyril Wiberg at halfback "was a little too slow under the faster conditions". In the drawn match between City and Ponsonby, Arthur Kay played brilliantly at centre for Ponsonby while Wilfred Dormer "got the ball away crisply and cleanly" from the scrum. Fullback William Greer who had gone off injured the previous week was still unavailable, and the man who replaced him during that game, Jack Silva, made a "capable deputy" when he started in the same place. Marist, who had been missing half their team the previous week through illness were back at full strength and over turned a 5–7 halftime deficit to beat North Shore 16–7. Marist would have won by more but Billy Grotte missed several goal kicks and the normally outstanding goal kicker, John Anderson had struggled recently and failed to kick any in this game. Billy Grotte's brother, Robert played well at halfback for the winners. Reginald Haslam "did all that was asked of him at centre" but their star in the backs was winger Jimmy Matthews who ran in three tries. North Shore badly missed the services of Jack Smith at fullback, though M Pitt played well there in his place. Verdun Scott was their best back, with Ross Jones, Condon, and Ted Scott playing well in the forwards. For Marist Kenneth Finlayson, Len Barchard, Bill Breed, and John Anderson were their best forwards.

6 May	Mount Albert	38-15	Manukau	Carlaw Park 1
3:00	Try: Des Herring 3, Robert Marshall 2, Arthur McInnarney, Bruce Donaldson, Bert Leatherbarrow; Con: Bruce Donaldson 4 Pen: Bruce Donaldson 3		Try: George Nepia, Tommy Chase, Jack Brodrick; Con: Jack Hemi 2 Pen: Jack Hemi	Attendance: Carlaw Park 1 Referee: Maurice Wetherill

6 May	City	11-11	Ponsonby	Carlaw Park 1
1:30	Try: Jim Gould, J Hutchinson; Pen: Jackie Rata 3		Try: Jack Campbell, Jack McManus, Clarrie Petersen; Con: Wilfred Dormer	Referee: H Tate

6 May	Marist	16-7	North Shore	Carlaw Park 2
3:00	Try: James Matthews 3, Reginald Haslam; Con: Len Barchard; Pen: Billy Grotte		Try: G Brown; Pen: Verdun Scott 2	Referee: Roy Otto

6 May	Newton	27-6	Papakura	Carlaw Park 2
1:30	Try: Mortimer Stephens 2, H Kendall, Donald McKenzie, Joseph Ginders, Cyril Blacklaws, F Lawson; Con: Claude Dempsey 2, Wilfred Brimble		Pen: J McInnes 2, W Cooke	Referee: (V.) G Kelly

==== Round 6 ====
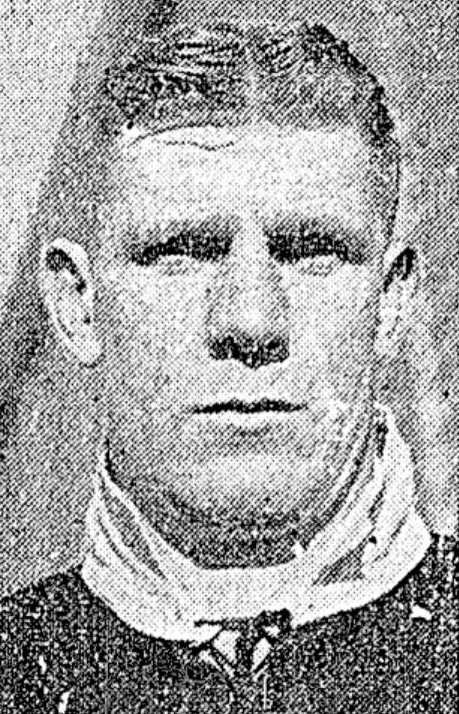
Wally Tittleton showed outstanding defence for Richmond against Manukau's star-studded backline.

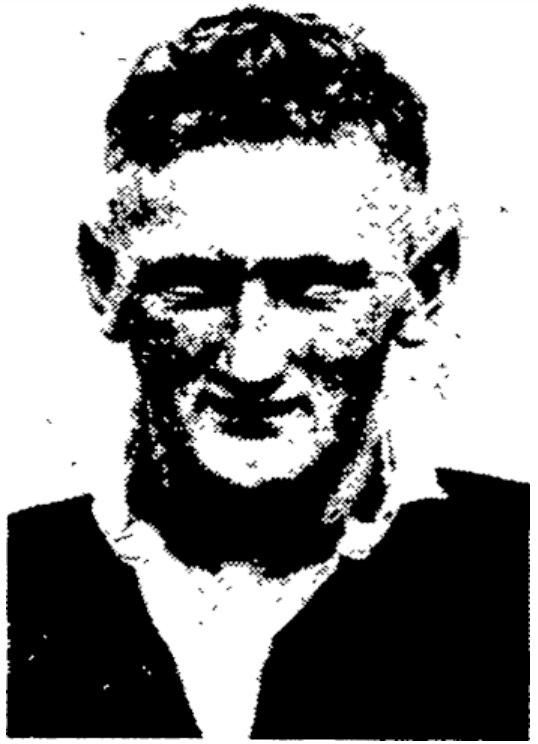
Abbie Graham, the young star for Richmond. He became a New Zealand rugby league international in 1947.

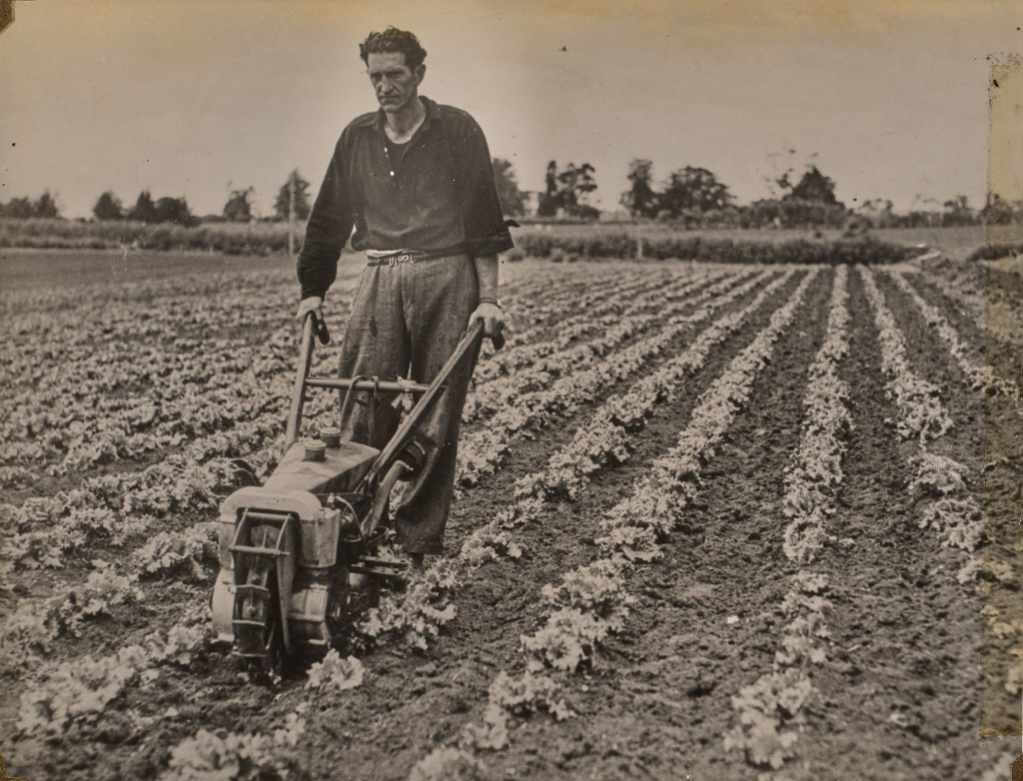
Cyril Blacklaws tending to his lettuce crop in Patumahoe in 1943.

In the match between North Shore and Newton at the Devonport Domain, Newton player Cyril Blacklaws was carried from the field with broken ribs. He missed several months and only returned to play late in the season. Jack Smith kicked five goals at fullback for North Shore, while Claude Dempsey his opposite kicked three. Ross Jones was North Shore's best forward, with S Hapeta also "in the limelight at times". Joseph Ginders was the best of the Newton pack. Marist played very well against Mt Albert who were missing Richard Shadbolt and Walter Cameron who were both injured. Marist led by five points at halftime but Mt Albert ran in 4 tries, all converted by Bruce Robertson to win 20–13. H McLachlan "played a splendid game" at fullback for Mt Albert. For Marist Phil Donovan was "exceptionally good" in the five eight line. Bill Breed went off with an injured leg and Clive Murdoch, first five eighth had to move into the scrum with Jimmy Chalmers coming on to play at first five-eighth. Manukau disappointed once more with it noted that with George Nēpia, Jack Hemi, Tommy Chase, and Walter Brimble in the backline they should be doing better. Nēpia was said to be no more than sound at fullback, though Tommy Chase with his brilliant left foot sidestep was well positioned on the left wing. Mihaka Panapa did not play well at five eighth and it was mentioned that he was being played out of position as he had come to Auckland from North Auckland as a halfback. The two outstanding forwards in the game were Merv Devine (Richmond), and Jack Brodrick (Manukau) who were brilliant in loose play and should be in the running for any representative sides. Twenty year old Abbie Graham played at second five eighth for Richmond in his first appearance of the season, and his side step and speed were impressive and he combined well with Noel Bickerton, with Alan Watkins sending out "long, well directed" passes. While Wally Tittleton's defence was described as "glorious". City had their bye and traveled to Huntly to play a match at Davies Park against Huntly District though the result was not reported. Ponsonby were missing Arthur Kay and struggled to settle down. Wilfred Dormer was good at halfback but had to leave the field injured. Brian Riley was not as impressive as usual at centre and Jack Campbell and Jack McManus on the wings did not get many chances. The Papakura forwards played much better than their backs as usual despite being without Percy Herkt and Dennis Evans. Harold Milliken, John Fogarty, and F.G. Wells were their best along with Ewan Cossey who usually played at first five-eighth. Thought Wright played with steadiness at fullback, and W Cooke who usually played in that position moved up to the five eighth line and game them "steadiness". Veteran Ponsonby forward Ray Middleton scored two of their three tries while Clarrie Petersen who was impressive scored their other one with Roy Nurse converting all three.

13 May	Mount Albert	20-13 (5-10)	Marist	Carlaw Park 1
3:00	Try: Joseph Gunning, Bruce Donaldson, Arthur McInnarney, Ernie Pinches; Con: Bruce Donaldson 4		Try: Ray Halsey, Kenneth Finlayson, J Logan; Con: John Anderson; Pen: John Anderson	Referee: Stuart Billman

13 May	Richmond	15-5	Manukau	Carlaw Park 1
1:30	Try: George Mitchell, Noel Bickerton, Jack McLeod; Con: Merv Devine 2 Pen: Merv Devine		Try: Angus Gault; Pen: Jack Hemi	Referee: Roy Otto

13 May	Ponsonby	15-4	Papakura	Carlaw Park 2
3:00	Try: Ray Middleton 2, Clarrie Petersen; Con: Roy Nurse 3		Pen: J McInnes 2	Referee: Jack Donovan

13 May	North Shore	19-12 (12-7)	Newton	Devonport Domain
3:00	Try: Ross Jones, Ivor Stirling, D Morgan; Con: Jack Smith 3 Pen: Jack Smith 2		Try: Donald McKenzie, Mortimer Stephens; Con: Claude Dempsey; Pen: Claude Dempsey 2	Referee: Owen Chalmers

==== Round 7 ====
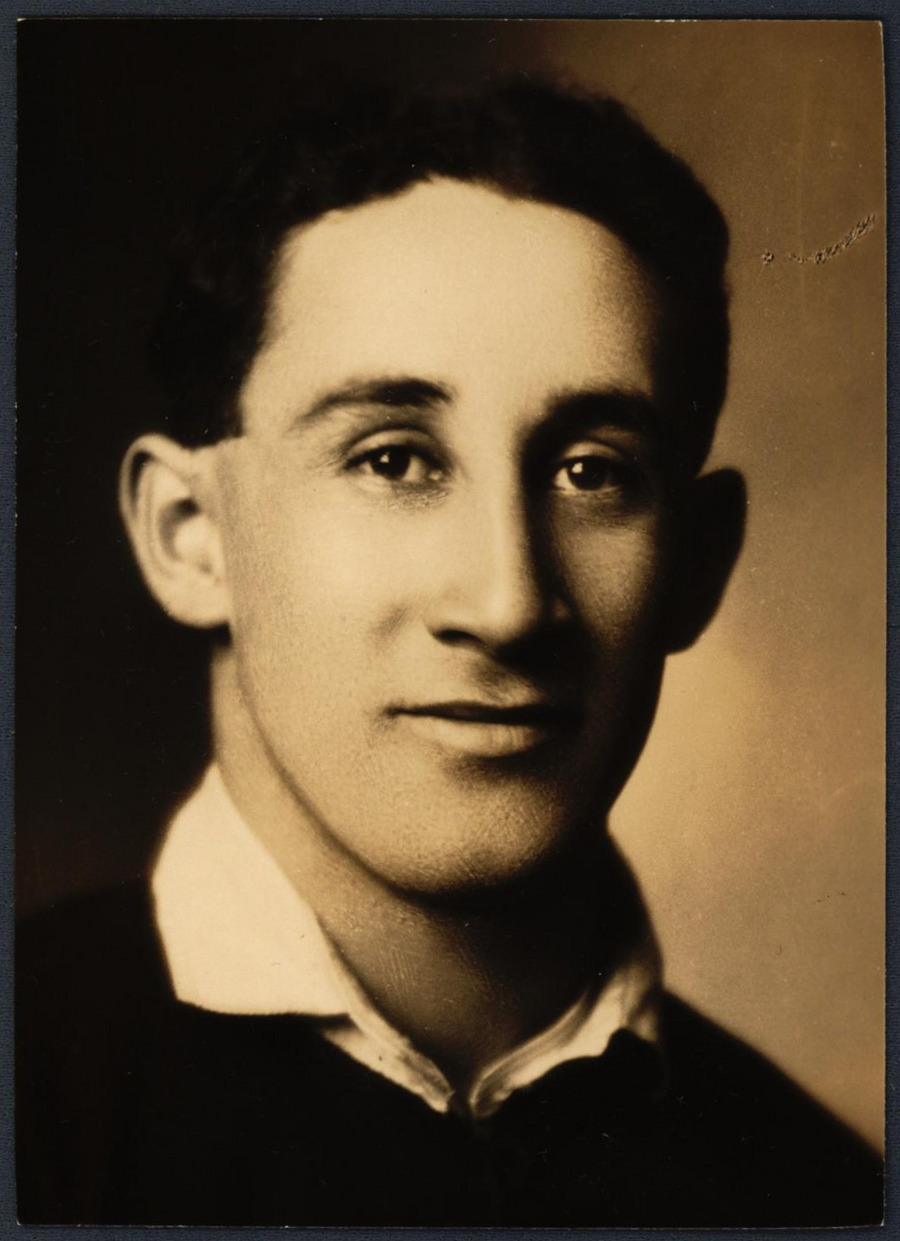
Dave Solomon who debuted for Richmond at first five-eighth.

Ex-New Zealand rugby union player Dave Solomon made his debut for Richmond and scored a try. Jack Campbell of the Ponsonby side was reported in the newspaper following this round to have been transferred to Christchurch for work reasons. He was selected for the New Zealand team later in the year. The Ponsonby v Marist match was reported as being 13–7 in both the New Zealand Herald and the Auckland Star however both newspapers only provided details for 10 of Ponsonby's points with a Ponsonby try scorer seemingly omitted. It is possible that Brian Riley or Watson in fact scored two tries.

20 May	North Shore	15-12	Mount Albert	Carlaw Park 1
3:00	Try: Thomas Field, M Pitt, G Brown; Con: Jack Smith; Pen: Jack Smith 2		Try: Roy Hardgrave, Clarry McNeil, Bruce Donaldson, Bert Leatherbarrow	Referee: G Kelly

20 May	Manukau	21-0	City	Carlaw Park 1
1:30	Try: Peter Mahima 3, Pita Ririnui, Freddie McGuire; Con: Jack Hemi 2 Pen: Jack Hemi			Referee: Jack Donovan

20 May	Ponsonby	13-7	Marist	Carlaw Park 2
3:00	Try: Brian Riley, Watson, Unknown x 1 Pen: Arthur Kay 2		Try: Ray Halsey; Pen: John Anderson 2	Referee: Maurice Wetherill

20 May	Papakura	17-23	Richmond	Prince Edward Park, Papakura
3:00	Try: Benny Crocker 2, J McInnes; Con: W Cooke; Pen: W Cooke 3		Try: Alan Watkins, George Mitchell 2, Dave Solomon, Frank Furnell, Laurie Mills; Con: Merv Devine	Referee: Owen Chalmers

==== Round 8 ====
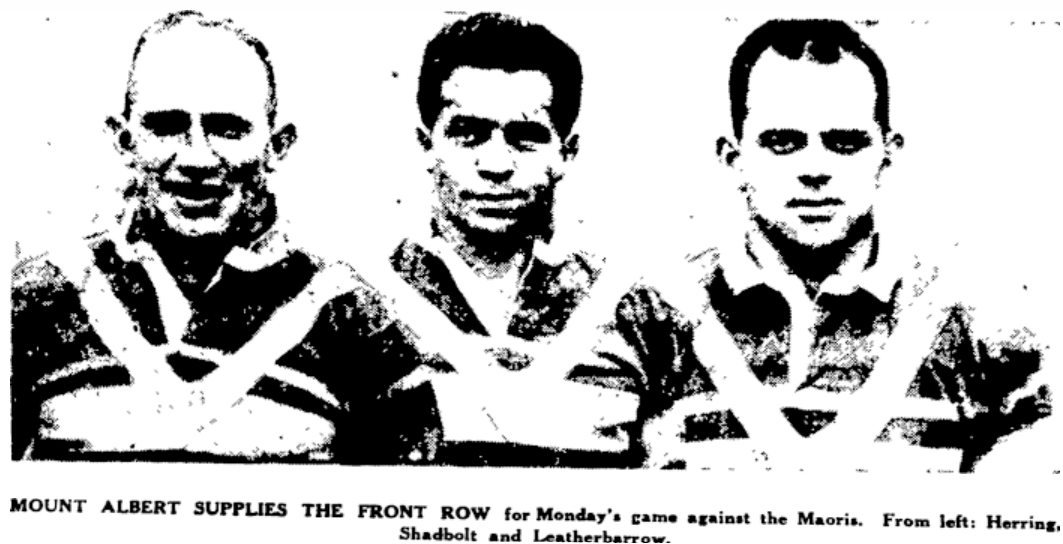
Des Herring, Richard Shadbolt, and Bert Leatherbarrow, the Mount Albert front row.

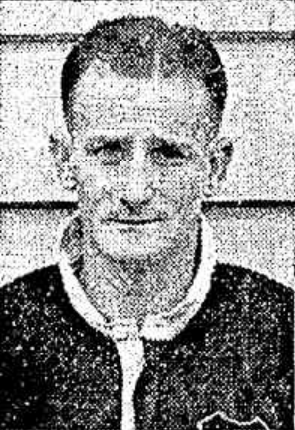
Jack Smith who kicked 12 points in North Shore's win including a 40-yard penalty and drop goal near the halfway line.

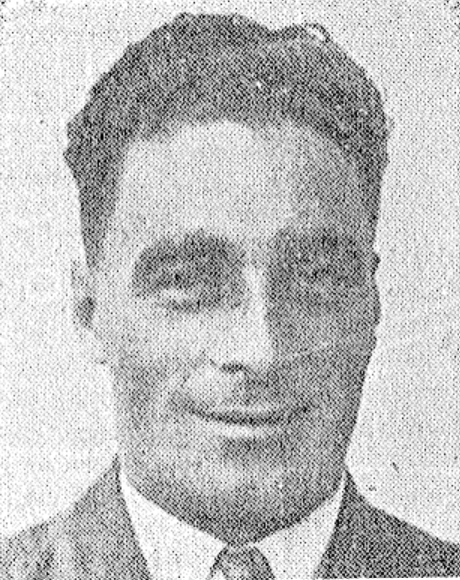
Mortimer Stephens the Newton winger who scored two tries. He had returned from England where he had spent three seasons playing for St Helens and Rochdale. He was originally from the Papakura club but transferred to Newton to play senior rugby league in 1933.

There was a lot of interest at Carlaw Park in the first appearance of former All-Black Dave Solomon after his debut the previous week was at Prince Edward Park in Papakura. There was surprise when he was played at halfback and it was thought that he would have been more use at first five eighth. He got the ball out well from the scrums but the five eighths struggled to do much with the ball with Abbie Graham not playing as well as usual, though Maurice Potter went well enough at first five eighth. Solomon's cover defence was said to be a feature of the game and was something he was well known for. Richmond lost forward George Mitchell to injury just before halftime and he was replaced by Stan Broadhead who was the brother of Alf Broadhead. Mitchell was the brother of Alf Mitchell who had played for New Zealand in 1935. They had an English father and Samoan mother and were amongst the first ever Pacific Island players in Auckland rugby league. George would be selected for the New Zealand tour of England later in the season. Jack McManus, a former Otahuhu player, used his speed on the wing brilliantly for Ponsonby on the wing and they scored an outstanding try to Edgar Morgan after McManus, Arthur Kay, Wilfred Dormer and Clarrie Petersen all combined before Morgan crossed. Loose forward, Petersen was said to have been the best forward on the ground. North Shore easily beat Papakura 21–0 after leading 16–0 at halftime. Their fullback Jack Smith had another great day with his kicking converting all three of their tries, and kicking two conversions and a drop goal. One of his penalties was from 40 yards out while his drop goal was from near halfway. Vincent Axmann, usually a halfback played at centre three-quarter in the absence of Verdun Scott. In the forwards for North Shore Ross Jones and S Hapeta, a recent recruit from Rotorua were their best. City were competitive against Mt Albert with the scores level midway through the second half however City forward Hawea Mataira stepped on the deadball line when attempting to bring his try closer to the posts and after this Mt Albert ran away with the game. Bruce Donaldson and Bob Banham, the Mt Albert five eighths beat the defence twice cleverly and tries resulted. Walker played a "sterling game" at halfback for the winners while in their forwards Joseph Gunning in his 4th season "played a fine game". Despite his error Mataira was "outstanding" for City while Jackie Rata was prominent in the backline at centre three-quarter and half back J Hutchinson was "a tower of strength". The Newton v Manukau game saw the three Brimble brothers meet. For Newton Ted Brimble and Wilfred Brimble combined in the first five-eighth - halfback positions, while Walter Brimble was at first five eighth for Manukau. Ted was in his 10th season of first grade for Newton, while Wilfred was in his fifth, and Walter his fourth for Manukau. S Anderson, a recent recruit from Australia kicked a penalty goal for Newton. Newton sealed victory after Ted and Wilfred made brilliant runs allowing Linley Sanders to score a try. The twelve stone winger, Mortimer (Monty) Stephens played his best game since returning from England on the wing making "several good runs" and scoring two tries. Stephens, then aged 21 had played for St Helens 56 times from February 1935 to 1937, scoring 20 tries and transferred to Rochdale in 1937 before returning to Auckland.

27 May	Ponsonby	14-10 (6-5)	Richmond	Carlaw Park 1
3:00	Try: Brian Riley, Edgar Morgan 2, Ray Middleton; Con: Arthur Kay		Try: Dave Solomon, Maurice Metcalfe; Con: Frank Furnell; Pen: Dave Solomon	Referee: Maurice Wetherill

27 May	Mount Albert	18-7	City	Carlaw Park 1
1:30	Try: W Walker, Bert Leatherbarrow, Roy Hardgrave, Bob Banham; Con: Bert Leatherbarrow, Bruce Donaldson; Pen: Bruce Donaldson		Try: Joseph Hapi; Con: Jackie Rata; Pen: J Hutchinson	Referee: Owen Chalmers

27 May	Newton	16-10	Manukau	Carlaw Park 2
3:00	Try: Mortimer Stephens 2, Donald McKenzie, Linley Sanders; Con: Wilfred Brimble; Pen: S Anderson		Try: Walter Brimble, P Awhitu; Con: Jack Hemi; Pen: Jack Hemi	Referee: Jack Hawkes

27 May	North Shore	21-0 (16-0)	Papakura	Carlaw Park 2
1:30	Try: Ross Jones, Ted Scott, Vincent Axmann; Con: Jack Smith 3 Pen: Jack Smith 2 Drop: Jack Smith			Referee: Roy Otto

==== Round 9 ====
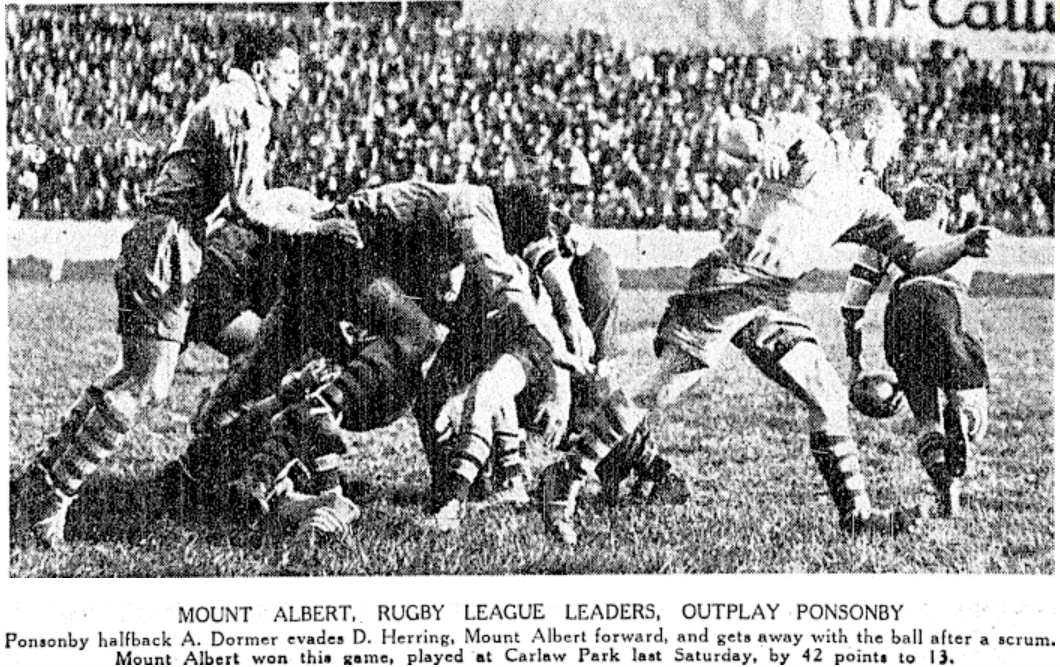
Ponsonby halfback Wilfred Dormer evading the grasp of Des Herring.

The Auckland Star said that Wilfred Brimble gave the "most brilliant exposition of halfback play that has been seen in Auckland this season". S Anderson from New South Wales was the key to Newton's win as he converted all four of their tries and added a penalty. Hermes Hadley (Richmond), and Maurice Quirke (Newton) were ordered off and both suspended for one match though the suspension didn't come until midweek after Hadley had played the Monday catch-up game against Marist.

3 June	Mount Albert	42-13	Ponsonby	Carlaw Park 1
3:00	Try: Roy Hardgrave 2, Joseph Gunning 2, Bruce Donaldson, Bob Banham, Martin Hansen, Bert Leatherbarrow, Arthur McInnarney; Con: Bruce Donaldson 5, Des Herring		Try: Arthur Kay, Edgar Morgan, Pat Young; Con: Arthur Kay 2	Referee: Jack Donovan

3 June	Newton	22-11	Richmond	Carlaw Park 1
1:30	Try: Joseph Ginders, Mortimer Stephens, Linley Sanders, Proctor; Con: S Anderson 4 Pen: S Anderson		Try: Dave Solomon, Trevor Bramley, Wally Tittleton; Con: Dave Solomon	Referee: Roy Otto

3 June	North Shore	26-16	City	Carlaw Park 2
3:00	Try: M Pitt 2, Jack Smith, Bennetts, Ivor Stirling, Tom Fields; Con: Jack Smith 3 Pen: Jack Smith		Try: Jackie Rata 2, John Donald, Hawea Mataira; Con: Jackie Rata 2	Referee: Stuart Billman

3 June	Manukau	26-11	Marist	Carlaw Park 2
1:30	Try: Joe Broughton 2, Freddie Maguire, Tommy Chase, Angus Gault, Jack Brodrick; Con: George Nepia 3 Pen: George Nepia		Try: Phil Donovan; Con: John Anderson; Pen: John Anderson 3	Referee: George Kelly

==== Catchup match ====
On June 5 a match was played between Richmond and Marist. The match was from round 2 but was not played as Manukau were playing the Eastern Suburbs side at Carlaw Park that day and so only 3 club matches could be played.

5 June	Richmond	24-10	Marist	Carlaw Park 1
1:30	Try: Wally Tittleton, Leo Davis, Jack McLeod, Abbie Graham, Dave Solomon, Hermes Hadley; Con: Trevor Bramley 3		Try: Jimmy Matthews, Robert Grotte; Con: John Anderson; Pen: John Anderson	Referee: Jack Hawkes

==== Round 10 ====
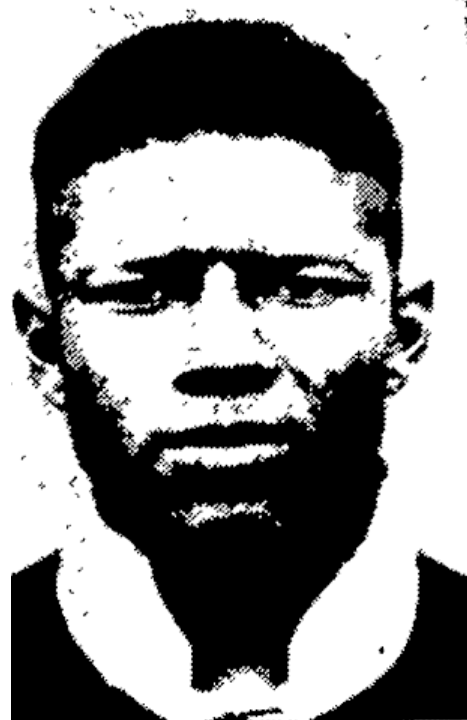
Ted Brimble who played an outstanding game at first five eighth for Newton.

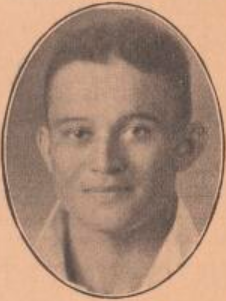
Wilfred Brimble, the Newton halfback who combined effectively with his brother.

For Manukau's match against Ponsonby they were missing George Nepia, Jack Hemi, Peter Mahima, and Jack Brodrick, while Ponsonby was missing Jack McManus (who had been injured the previous week in the first minute of the game), whilst Brian Riley went off injured early in the match after having looked good prior to this. Clarrie Petersen dropped out of the scrum to take up a position as wing three-quarter. Mihaka Panapa played a brilliant game at halfback for Manukau in their 10–6 win. Outside him Walter Brimble and Tommy Chase played well with Chase being "constructive on attack" and showing "good defence". Cyril Wiberg played in the unfamiliar position of fullback with Nēpia and Hemi both absent and was sound, outplaying his opposite, Shilling. William Greer who had begun the season with City transferred to Papakura and played his first match with them against Mount Albert. Papakura had lost he services of one of their best forwards in Percy Herkt who had transferred to Wellington for work. Despite this they managed to hold the Mt Albert side to a 13–13 draw at Prince Edward Park in Papakura. The home team led 13-0 and threatened to hand the competition leaders only their second loss of the season with Harold Milliken leading their forwards who gave the backs "a feast of the ball". J McInnes scored one of their three tries and kicked two conversions. Ewan Cossey, Papakura's first five eighth was outstanding and was involved in all of their tries. In Mt Albert's second half comeback tries were scored by Des Herring, Robert Marshall, and Arthur McInnarney with their outstanding five eighth, Bruce Donaldson kicking a conversion and a penalty. Richmond outplayed City who failed to score a point in their 8–0 loss on a "sloppy ground". Hawea Mataira and John Donald were the best forwards for City while Jack Airey hooked well for them against New Zealand international hooker Jack Satherley in the first half. Airey was a former Canterbury representative. In the second half Satherley began to dominate the hooking. City forward Bill Jackson was injured early and was replaced by Joseph Hapi who was in his fifth season with City though his first playing as a forward. F Whittle played at fullback following William Greer's departure. J Hutchinson was good at halfback but Graham Simpson at five eighth was accused of kicking too much meaning Jackie Rata and Jim Gould got few opportunities. In the Richmond backline Dave Solomon's defence was excellent though Abbie Graham outside him did not handle well. Laurie Mills attacked brilliantly when he got the ball on the wing and was their best back while Trevor Bramley played "splendidly" at fullback. Andrew Kronfeld debuted for Richmond on the wing and "made a good impression". In Newton's 5–2 win over Marist the Brimble brothers Wilfred and Ted "worked like a machine" in the half/five eighth positions. Other impressive backs for them were Linley Sanders and Claude Dempsey. For Marist, half back Robert Grotte was "outstanding", giving "good service" but this was nullified by poor combination of the men outside him who did not handle well in the slippery conditions. In the forwards Jack Taylor and M Proctor were the best for Newton. Marist missed the services of Reginald Haslam and Gordon Midgley in the backs with John Anderson playing at centre instead of his usual loose forward position.

10 June	Richmond	8-0 (2-0)	City	Carlaw Park 1
3:00	Try: Dave Solomon, Laurie Mills; Pen: Trevor Bramley			Referee: Jack Hawkes

10 June	Manukau	10-6 (0-3)	Ponsonby	Carlaw Park 1
1:30	Try: Waka McLeod, J Marsh; Con: Tommy Chase; Pen: Tommy Chase		Try: Pat Young, Wilfred Dormer	Referee: Stuart Billman

10 June	Newton	5-2	Marist	Carlaw Park 2
3:00	Try: Jack Taylor; Con: S Anderson		Pen: John Anderson	Referee: Owen Chalmers

10 June	Papakura	13-13 (13-0)	Mount Albert	Prince Edward Park, Papakura
3:00	Try: Dobbyn, John Fogarty, J McInnes; Con: J McInnes 2		Try: Des Herring, Robert Marshall, Arthur McInnarney; Con: Bruce Donaldson; Pen: Bruce Donaldson	Referee: Roy Otto

==== Round 11 ====
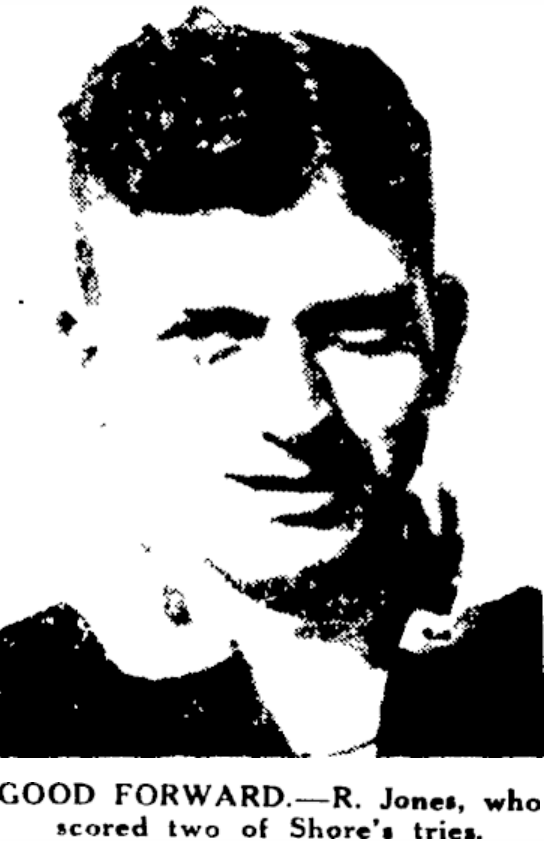

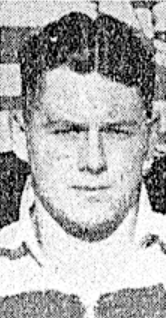
Arthur Kay who was in season best form for Ponsonby at second five-eighth.

Newton caused an upset 21–7 win over Mt Albert. Mt Albert were unlucky to lose second five-eighth Bruce Donaldson shortly before halftime but it was reported that it would have made little difference to the result. Les Clement replaced him. Newton's backs received a lot of possession due to hooker Bert Leatherbarrow not being available for Mt Albert. The Brimble brothers once again played well, taking advantage of their chances. Claude Dempsey the Newton fullback in his tenth season of senior football beat his opposite, H McLachlan in kicking duels. For North Shore, young forward Ross Jones scored two of their four tries in a 16–8 win over Ponsonby. The Auckland Star and New Zealand Herald both praised his form saying that he was the best forward find in Auckland for years and that he must be seriously considered for the New Zealand team to tour England and France. He did indeed go on to be selected for the tour. Jones had also been a junior Auckland cycling champion in 1934 aged just 16. Jack Smith played an outstanding game at fullback and was the form fullback of the competition. His try came after he cut inside Verdun Scott and caught the Ponsonby backs "hopelessly out of position". Scott also played a very good game at centre while Ivor Stirling was good at halfback. All three players would go on to be selected for the New Zealand tour of England as was Ross Jones. In the Ponsonby side Arthur Kay "played his best game this season", while Brian Riley "played well at centre". Ewan Cossey was outstanding once again at first five-eighth for Papakura in their 12–9 win over City. J McInness scored a try and kicked 2 conversions and a penalty. Richmond soundly beat Marist 26–14 with the score flattering the losing side. At one stage Richmond led 26-5 but Marist scored three late unconverted tries to narrow the score. For Richmond Dave Solomon scored twice and was "outstanding throughout the game" while Abbie Graham also scored two tries, while fullback Trevor Bramley converted four of their six tries. Charles Webb played well for Richmond on debut at halfback after being promoted from their reserve grade side. Marist played John Anderson in the backs once again, this time at second five eighth but it was not a success and they moved him back into the loose forwards where he had played all of his career, with Billy Grotte switching places. The move improved the backs performance.

17 June	Newton	21-7 (7-5)	Mount Albert	Carlaw Park 1
3:00	Try: Donald McKenzie, Mortimer Stephens, Jack Taylor; Con: S Anderson, Wilfred Brimble; Pen: S Anderson 4		Try: W Walker; Con: Bruce Donaldson; Pen: Des Herring	Referee: Jack Donovan

17 June	North Shore	16-8 (3-3)	Ponsonby	Carlaw Park 1
1:30	Try: Ross Jones 2, Jack Smith, S Hapeta; Con: Jack Smith; Pen: Jack Smith		Try: Brian Riley, Arthur Kay; Con: Arthur Kay	Referee: Roy Otto

17 June	Richmond	26-14 (15-5)	Marist	Carlaw Park 2
1:30	Try: Dave Solomon 2, Abbie Graham 2, Wally Tittleton, Keith Fletcher; Con: Trevor Bramley 4		Try: Kenneth Finlayson, Ray Halsey, Robert Grotte, Gordon Midgley; Pen: John Anderson	Referee: Owen Chalmers

17 June	Papakura	12-9 (12-7)	City	Carlaw Park 2
1:30	Try: J McInnes, Ewan Cossey; Con: J McInnes 2 Pen: J McInnes		Try: Jim Gould; Pen: J Hutchinson 3	Referee: T Evans

==== Round 12 ====
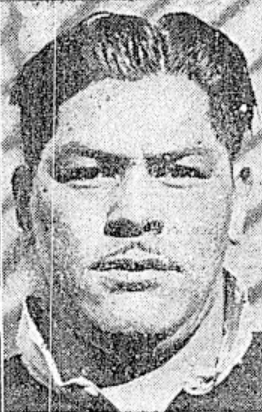
Pita Ririnui, Manukau's fine forward who scored two tries.

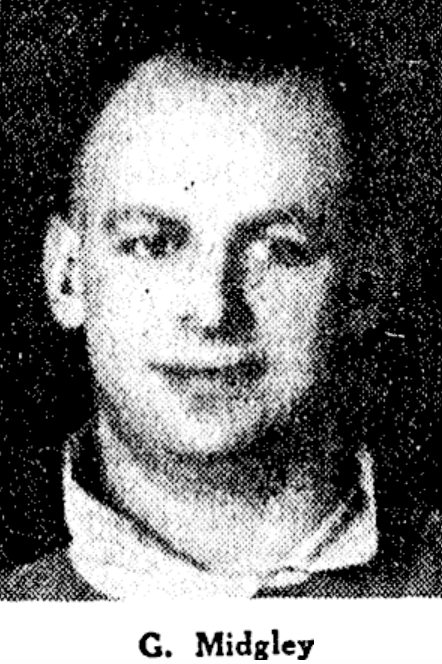
Gordon Midgley who scored three tries for Marist.

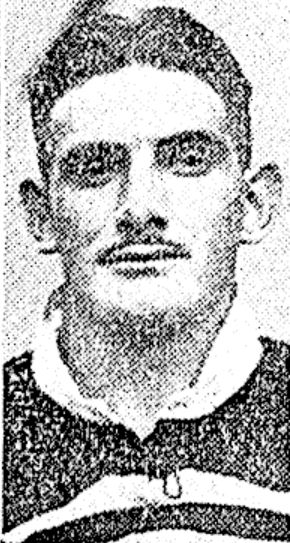
Jack Brodrick, Manukau's loose forward who was in brilliant form.

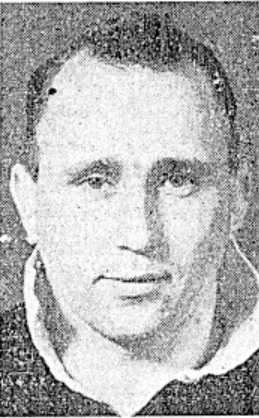
Harold Milliken, the Papakura forward who played for the All Blacks. He was in his debut rugby league season but was amongst the best forwards in the game by this stage of the season.

Taranaki played against Northland in a representative match at Carlaw Park as the curtain-raiser to the North Shore v Richmond match. While Manukau hosted Papakura at Waikaraka Park in Onehunga where Manukau were based at this time of their existence. A feature of the game was the goal kicking of Jack Hemi for Manukau and J McInnes for Papakura who kicked six and four goals respectively. The game was in the balance until Pita Ririnui "bustled his way through to score two splendid tries". Other highlights were Jack Brodrick's long pass to Joe Broughton in the Papakura tryline for a try, and Broughton's reverse pass to Hemi which gave him an easy try. In comments on the game the New Zealand Herald said that Ririnui, Brodrick, and Harold Milliken "were responsible for some of the finest play seen in the code for a considerable time". Papakura was unlucky to lose F Wells to injury in the first half where he was replaced by Holmes while they later lost captain John Fogarty. George Nēpia had a slight injury and so did not play with Cyril Wiberg taking his place again at fullback. In the principal match at Carlaw Park, North Shore defeated Richmond 9–8. Dave Solomon "played a constructive game that was full of merit" and often cleaned up his teammates mistakes. For North Shore their fullback Jack Smith "played the smooth, polished game which is expected of the best league fullback in New Zealand, fielding cleanly, placing his kicks with judgment, tackling unerringly and often running his supports into better position". Eric Chatham debuted on the wing for North Shore but didn't get many chances though "on a couple of occasions showed real pace and dash". Ted Scott in his ninth season for North Shore scored an opportunist try which essentially won them the match. It came after Verdun Scott had a long kick at goal which hit the crossbar, bounced up and hit the post before bouncing in the field and over the try line. Ted, a cousin of Verdun knocked the ball out of a defenders hands and scored. As usual George Mitchell, Jack McLeod, and Merv Devine stood out in the Richmond forwards. newton continued their good form with a 15–6 win over Ponsonby. The Brimble brothers Ted and Wilfred were "always in the limelight" while their centre three-quarter, Linley Sanders "played an outstanding game and his first try was a masterpiece, the result of his quickness to grasp an opportunity and sure handling and strong running in making the most of it". Cyril Blacklaws returned to the Newton side after suffering broken ribs earlier in the season and "played well". In the Ponsonby forward pack Frank Bell was said to have played his best game since coming from Sydney, while Clarrie Petersen "got through his work in finished style". And their hooker, Huck Flanagan was said to have "no peer in Auckland" when it comes to hooking clean ball from the scrum. Des Williams was promoted from the juniors and played "a fair game at halfback". He would go on to play several more seasons for the side. In Marist's 20–5 win against City their star player was Robert Grotte at halfback, he "stood out head and shoulders above the rest of the backs on the field". Towards the end of the game Gordon Midgley became more involved and ran in three tries in succession "by determined running". In the City forward pack Hawea Mataira "was easily the best forward" but was well assisted by Leslie Wehner, John Donald, and Bill Jackson. Donald played on in the second half despite being injured and it was later found out that he had a broken forearm.

24 June	North Shore	9-8 (4-3)	Richmond	Carlaw Park 1
3:00	Try: Ted Scott; Con: Jack Smith; Pen: Jack Smith 2		Try: Wally Tittleton, Andrew Kronfeld; Pen: Trevor Bramley	Referee: Owen Chalmers

24 June	Newton	15-6	Ponsonby	Carlaw Park 2
3:00	Try: Linley Sanders 2, Wilfred Brimble; Con: Wilfred Brimble 2, S Anderson		Try: Edgar Morgan 2	Referee: George Kelly

24 June	Marist	20-5 (3-0)	City	Carlaw Park 2
1:30	Try: Gordon Midgley 3, J Logan, Cyril Erickson, Ray Halsey; Con: Kenneth Finlayson		Try: Graham Simpson; Con: John Donald	Referee: Ken McIvor

24 June	Manukau	24-16	Papakura	Waikaraka Park, Onehunga
3:00	Try: Pita Ririnui 2, Jack Broughton, Jack Hemi (obstruction try); Con: Jack Hemi 3 Pen: Jack Hemi 3		Try: Trevor Hoskin, Penalty Try; Con: J McInnes; Pen: J McInnes 3 Drop: William Greer	Referee: Jack Donovan

==== Round 13 ====
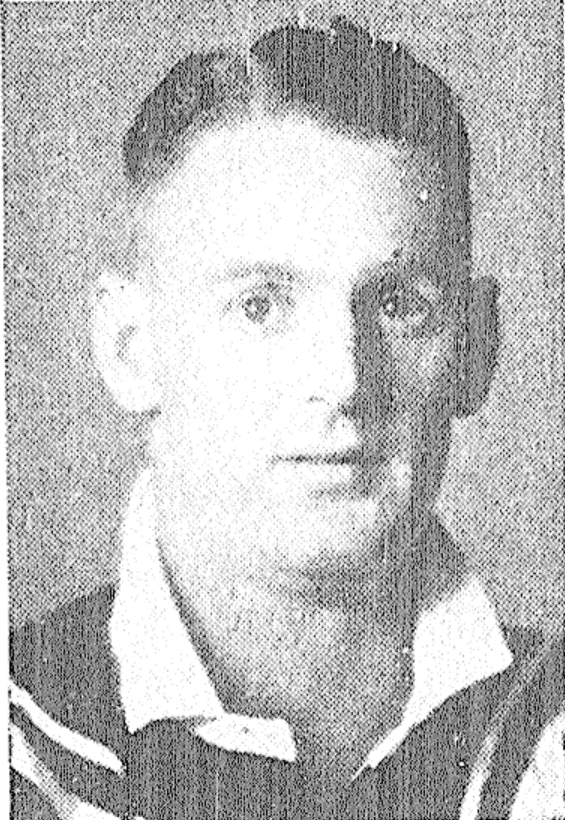
Ivor Stirling, the in-form North Shore halfback.

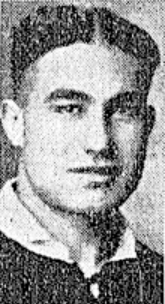
Hawea Mataira, City's outstanding forward.

The main match between North Shore and Manukau saw the two outstanding fullbacks up against each other in Jack Smith, and George Nēpia. The Auckland Star wrote "Nēpia of Manukau and Smith of Shore, are both candidates for a place in the New Zealand team. Both played the positional games but Nēpia's display was marked by a deeper strategy, and he showed great skill at running supports into position". Robert Cheator played how first game for North Shore on the wing and "tackled brilliantly", including two times against Jack Hemi who was in full flight for the try line. For North Shore who won 19–5, Ivor Stirling continued "to show good form" at halfback, and in the forwards Ross Jones "was outstanding" and Ted Scott supported well. Like previous weeks Pita Ririnui and Jack Brodrick stood out in the Manukau forwards. Newton seemed certain to win against City but "slippery conditions and stout defence upset many a promising movement" in the final 20 minutes and they were defeated 6–5. For City Owen Hughes and Jim Gould "showed up well" while Hawea Mataira and Leslie Wehner were the best of the forwards who badly missed the services of John Donald who was baldy injured the week before. They also lost J.A. Thompson who went off with a knee injury during second half leaving them a man short. In their backs Owen Hughes at halfback struggle to combine with Madigan who was a promoted junior at first five-eighth, though his defence stood up well. In Marist's win over Papakura 7–5, Cliff Hudson, a former Wellington rugby union representative player debuted though he did not get many opportunities. Hudson had been a member of the Petone rugby club for five years and also the Petone cricket club while he played twice for Wellington at rugby union. He had been transferred to Auckland for work in April 1938 and joined the Ponsonby rugby club before switching to rugby league at this point in the 1939 season. Harold Milliken in the Papakura forwards "was the outstanding forward. He played a truly remarkable game in the Papakura front line". As in previous weeks Dave Solomon showed play "of a very high order". Merv Devine was missing from the Richmond forwards but their other two standouts George Mitchell, and Jack McLeod "were the best". In the Mt Albert backs, halfback W Walker "played a polished game of a quality that should strengthen his claims for representative honours". Bob Banham cross kicked from first five eighth a lot and so Bruce Donaldson received little of the ball. J Donnelly on debut for Mt Albert "made a good impression by his speed and resolute running". In the Mt Albert forwards Walter Cameron, the Australian "was more prominent than usual" while Martin Hansen finished up in the fullback position after H. McLachlan went off injured. Robert Marshall the centre-threequarter moved into Hansen's position at the back of the scrum.

1 July	North Shore	19-5 (7-2)	Manukau	Carlaw Park 1
3:00	Try: Tom Field, Ross Jones, Ted Scott; Con: Verdun Scott 2, Jack Smith; Pen: Verdun Scott 2		Try: Cyril Wiberg; Pen: Jack Hemi	Referee: Roy Otto

1 July	Mount Albert	11-6	Richmond	Carlaw Park 1
1:30	Try: Bruce Donaldson, W Walker, Roy Hardgrave; Con: Des Herring		Try: Laurie Mills 2	Referee: George Kelly

1 July	City	6-5 (3-5)	Newton	Carlaw Park 2
3:00	Try: Jim Gould, Owen Hughes		Try: Linley Sanders; Con: S Anderson	Referee: Stuart Billman

1 July	Marist	7-5 (4-0)	Papakura	Carlaw Park 2
1:30	Try: Gordon Midgley; Pen: John Anderson 2		Try: Dobbyn; Con: J McInnes	Referee: J Jones

==== Round 14 ====
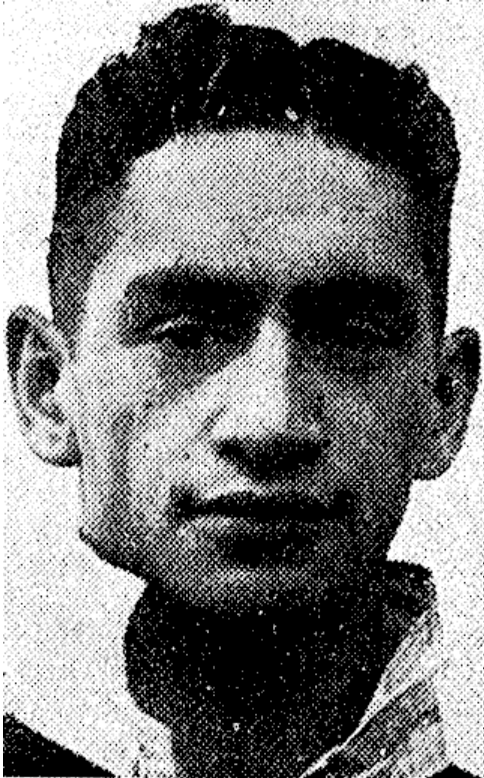
Jack Hemi, who scored a try and kicked five goals in Manukau's loss to Mt Albert.

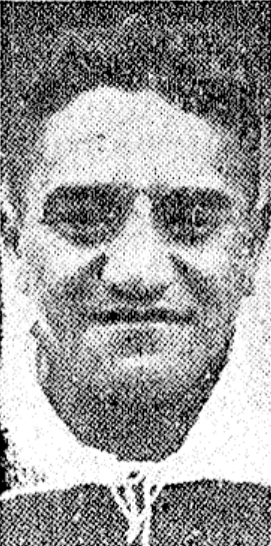
Peter Mahima, the Manukau halfback who gave his backs good service. He played 6 games for Auckland Māori and three for Auckland from 1936 to 1940.

In Marist's upset 18–5 win over North Shore their hooker, Kenneth Finlayson won them a lot of ball from the scrums. Robert Grotte played well for them at halfback "and got his passes away well" while Hughes and Jimmy Chalmers combined well in the five eighths. For North Shore Jack Smith was injured early and so moved from the fullback position to centre three-quarter with Verdun Scott swapping places with him. Brown was their best back making many openings from the second five-eighth position. For Marist Cliff Hudson in his second game for the side playing at centre scored two tries and was their best back with Ivor Stirling also playing well at halfback while in the forwards Ted Scott stood out. S Hapeta the North Shore forward was sent off and suspended for one match. The loss saw North Shore lose their position at the top of the standings. Bob Banham who had already been selected for the New Zealand tour had to leave the field in his Mount Albert match with Manukau. He returned heavily bandaged and needed stitches afterwards. With the game close Manukau threw everything they could at Mt Albert to win the game but brilliant tackling by Bruce Roberston and Banham held them out. On the wing for Mt Albert, Roy Hardgrave "gave a brilliant demonstration of wing three quarter play though Arthur McInnarney who had just been selected for the New Zealand tour was quiet on the other wing. Bert Leatherbarrow played well in the forwards as did Richard Shadbolt and Joseph Gunning, the later being considered unlucky not to make the New Zealand team. Mt Albert played long time forward Martin Hansen at fullback but the move was not considered a success. For Manukau halfback Peter Mahima and first five eighth Walter Brimble gave good service to the backs but Jack Hemi made many errors at second five eighth. As a result Tommy Chase did not get many chances at centre three-quarter. At fullback George Nēpia was playing a sound game but had to leave the field with an injury and Jack Brodrick moved on to the wing and the fast loose forwards "revealed possibilities" in that position which he had only played occasionally previously. It was announced after the game that J.F.W Dickson was donating a gold medal to be awarded to Jack Hemi for "sportsmanlike conduct" and it would be presented to him the following weekend. City beat Ponsonby without the services of Hawea Mataira who had just been selected for the New Zealand tour, while Arthur Kay who was also selected was absent from the Ponsonby side as was Brian Riley. Clarrie Petersen, usually a break away forward filled in on the left wing for Ponsonby. For City, winger Jim Gould scored all three of their tries "his handling was good throughout, he tackled well andused his pace to advantage". Jack McManus was also good in the five eighths as was Graham Simpson at centre three-quarter. Newton required a last minute try to R Proctor to draw a hard-fought game with Papakura. At halftime the only points had come from a penalty by Wilfred Brimble after Newton's forward, S Anderson had taken and missed four. Papakura took the lead in the second half when their winger, Anderson scored a lucky try when he the New Zealand Herald reported that he lost the ball when attempting to ground it. A penalty increased Papakura's lead to 5–3 before Newton's late equaliser. For Papakura, John Fogarty and Harold Milliken were their best in the forwards while Benny Crocker and J McInnes the best of their backs who were missing regular first five-eighth, Ewan Cossey, with Reeve playing well in his absence.

15 July	Mount Albert	21-19 (8-7)	Manukau	Carlaw Park 1
3:00	Try: Roy Hardgrave 2, Bert Leatherbarrow, Robert Marshall, Joseph Gunning; Con: Bruce Donaldson 3		Try: George Nepia, Jack Hemi, P Awhitu; Con: Jack Hemi 3 Pen: Jack Hemi 2	Referee: Stuart Billman

15 July	Marist	18-5	North Shore	Carlaw Park 1
1:30	Try: Cliff Hudson 2, Gordon Midgley, Robert Grotte; Con: John Anderson 2 Pen: John Anderson		Try: MacIntosh; Pen: Jack Smith	Referee: Jack Donovan

15 July	Newton	5-5 (2-0)	Papakura	Carlaw Park 2
3:00	Try: R Proctor; Pen: Wilfred Brimble		Try: Anderson; Pen: J McInnes	Referee: Owen Chalmers

15 July	City	13-8 (10-5)	Ponsonby	Carlaw Park 2
1:30	Try: Jim Gould 3 Con: Jack Silva; Pen: Jack Silva		Try: W Briggs, Des Williams; Pen: Roy Nurse	Referee: H Tate

==== Round 15 ====
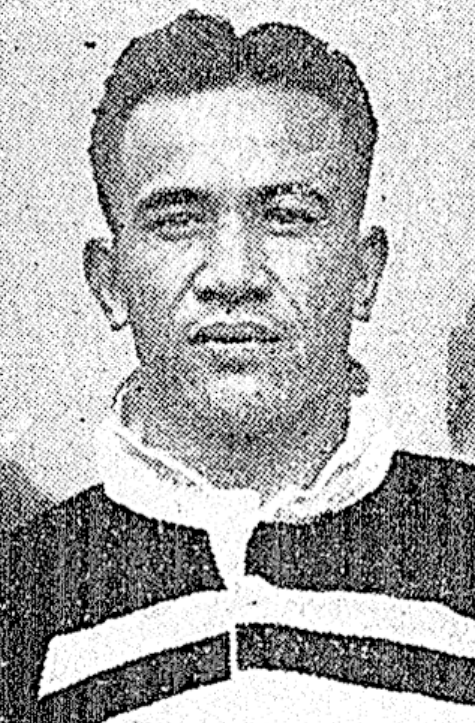
Tommy Chase the outstanding Manukau back.

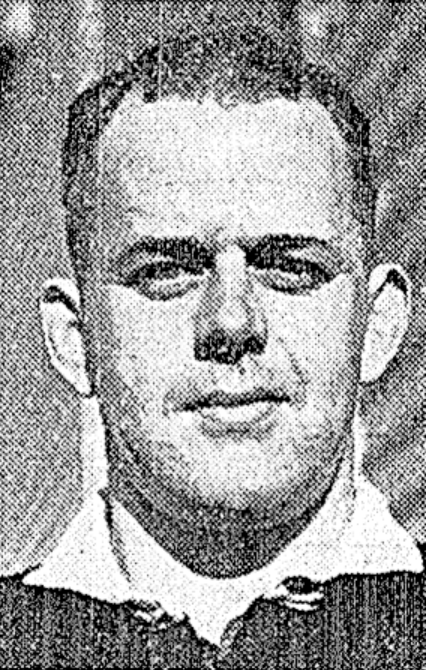
Bert Leatherbarrow, the international Mt Albert hooker.

Mt Albert struggled to beat Marist but two converted tries brought them victory. Gerry Hughes, their new five eighth played an outstanding game "and one try that he got was the result of incisive running and swift changes of direction". Cyril Erickson and Kenneth Finlayson were particular good in the Marist forwards. For Mt Albert, Richard Shadbolt, Walter Cameron, and Joseph Gunning "were all deserving of places in the New Zealand team" according to the Auckland Star, however none of them was actually selected. W Walker "played brilliantly at halfback" however Bob Banham and Bruce Donaldson did not play as well together as usual in the five eighths. Donaldson did kick well though, kicking six goals. Of their wings, Roy Hardgrave was "more impressive" than his teammate Arthur Hardgrave though it was noted that Hardgrave was more experienced in his sixteenth year of senior football compared to McInnarney in just his second. For the second week in a row Martin Hansen had to fill in at fullback with H McLachlan absent. Marist would likely have won but Des Herring beat tackles by Jimmy Chalmers and Gerry Hughes and then a forward before he passed to Hardgrave who scored. Bert Leatherbarrow "took the hooking honours" from Kenneth Finlayson. Manukau beat Richmond 23-14 and it George Nēpia "gave a display that was so good that it could only occasion regrets that he is not in the New Zealand team to go to England, while Brodrick's display at wing three-quarter was refreshing after some of the weak displays in the position given in the recent trial matches. Brodrick is a versatile player, and with speed and over 14st weight is a decidedly unusual type of back". In addition to those two, "Tommy Chase was brilliant, and Jack Hemi and Peter Mahima were in excellent form". Chase being "undoubtedly" the outstanding player for Manukau. In their forwards Pita Ririnui and J Marsh "were outstanding". Ririnui "played easily his best game of this season". In the Richmond forwards Jack McLeod "was the best". Their best back was Trevor Bramley at fullback. Alf Broadhead of Richmond was sent off for “reckless tackling” and suspended for one week. Jack Satherley received a bad face injury and had to be treated at Auckland Hospital. In Newton's 11–10 win over a depleted North Shore side Claude Dempsey who had been brought up into the five eighths, Linley Sanders, Mortimer Stephens, and brother Bill and Donald Mckenzie "shared the honours". Dempsey went off near the end of the game after being injured. North Shore was without Jack Smith, Verdun Scott, Ivor Stirling, and Ross Jones who had been selected for the New Zealand team to tour. Their best player was Ted Scott, their loose forward "who seemed to be wherever he was wanted, and retrieved many an awkward situation". Despite Newton's perceived advantage they only led 4–0 at halftime following two penalties to S Anderson. North Shore then suffered two further losses when wingers Bennetts and O'Brien in the forwards left the field injured to be replaced by Somervell and G. Brown. Ponsonby dominated their match with Papakura largely thanks to their hooker Huck Flanagan who won the ball consistently from the scrums. Clarrie Petersen once again played in the backs and he and Roy Nurse were "the outstanding players" in that area for Ponsonby.

22 July	Mount Albert	24-15 (6-7)	Marist	Carlaw Park 1
3:00	Try: Roy Hardgrave 2, Des Herring, Jack Tristram; Con: Bruce Donaldson 2 Pen: Bruce Donaldson 3 Drop: Bruce Donaldson		Try: Gerry Hughes, Ray Halsey, John Anderson; Con: John Anderson 2 Pen: John Anderson	Referee: George Kelly

22 July	Manukau	23-14	Richmond	Carlaw Park 1
1:30	Try: Freddie Maguire, Cyril Wiberg, Jack Brodrick, Pita Ririnui, Tommy Chase; Con: Jack Hemi 3 Pen: Jack Hemi		Try: Stan Broadhead, Maurice Potter; Pen: Edgar Takle 4	Referee: M McIvor

22 July	Newton	11-10 (4-0)	North Shore	Carlaw Park 2
3:00	Try: Beattie; Con: S Anderson; Pen: S Anderson 2 Drop: Donald McKenzie		Try: Barnett 2 Con: Robert Cheater 2	Referee: Stuart Billman

22 July	Ponsonby	19-9 (11-0)	Papakura	Carlaw Park 2
1:30	Try: Carr, Funnell, Dunning, W Briggs, Des Williams; Con: Edgar Morgan 2		Try: J McInnes; Con: J McInnes; Pen: J McInnes, William Greer	Referee: Owen Chalmers

==== Round 16 ====
Robert Grotte who played an outstanding game at halfback for Marist.

With their 8–0 win over North Shore, Mount Albert sealed the championship. It gave them an unassailable 5 pt lead over the same side with only two rounds remaining. Even without Bob Banham, Arthur McInnarney, and Bert Leatherbarrow who were traveling to England with the New Zealand side they "were able to capably fill their places". The games were played in "rain, hail, and slush" but "some good football was played". For the North Shore side Hall played "a fine constructive game at full-back" while Robert Cheater "disclosed great pace on the wing, and Perry played a striking game at halfback". Hall and Perry were both promoted juniors with Jack Smith, Verdun Scott, and Ivor Stirling all away on tour. For the winners Bruce Donaldson in the five eighths "gave one of the best displays seen at Carlaw Park this season, being in every constructive movement. The easy method in which he beat the opposition showed Donaldson to be the best attacking back in the game in Auckland". Ponsonby beat Marist 16–5 with Clarrie Petersen playing on the wing once more and he gave an otherwise good display but made a couple of bad handling errors in "critical occasions". Ponsonby were missing Arthur Kay and Brian Riley but Carr at second five eighth "showed brilliant attacking skill". Huck Flanagan at hooker was well matched by Kenneth Finlayson his Marist opposite but Ponsonby forward Frank Bell was the best forward on the ground. At one point he fended off four players and ran 40 yards before passing to Carr who scored. For Marist at halfback Robert Grotte "gave one of the best halfback displays of the season... while Cliff Hudson in the centre gave an exhibition which stamped him as the best player in Auckland in that position". The match between City and Manukau was 9–9 at halftime and neither team could add to their totals in the second half. George Nēpia "at full back stood out as the best player on the field" but it was the City forwards that took "the honours of the game". J.A. Thompson was the best of them though he had to leave the field injured late in the match. Nēpia's play was even more remarkable given the game was played in ankle deep mud. His "fielding, line kicking and co-operation with the back line on attack had the stamp of a master of the game", while his opposite F Whittle was also excellent. For Richmond in their 11–10 win over Papakura, Charles Webb at halfback "played grandly" and received good support from C Williams, Maurice Potter, and Abbie Graham.

29 July	Mount Albert	8-0 (8-0)	North Shore	Carlaw Park 1
3:00	Try: Joseph Gunning, W Walker; Pen: Bruce Donaldson			Referee: Ken McIvor

29 July	Ponsonby	16-5 (10-5)	Marist	Carlaw Park 1
1:30	Try: Carr 2, Hector Dunning, Pat Young; Con: Edgar Morgan 2		Try: John Anderson; Pen: John Anderson	Referee: J Jones

29 July	City	9-9 (9-9)	Manukau	Carlaw Park 2
3:00	Try: James Brassey, A Smith, Jack Silva		Try: P Awhitu 2, Jack Brodrick	Referee: Jack Hawkes

29 July	Richmond	11-10 (6-5)	Papakura	Carlaw Park 2
1:30	Try: Jack McLeod, Abbie Graham, Stan Broadhead; Con: Charles Webb		Try: John Fogarty 2 Con: J McInnes; Pen: J McInnes	Referee: Jack Donovan

==== Round 17 ====
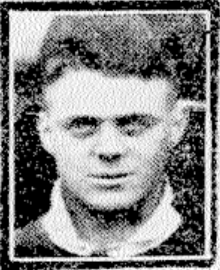
Roy Hardgrave the veteran Mt Albert winger in his 16th senior season aged 32 was still playing brilliantly.

Newton upset Richmond 9–0 with their backs dominating. Claude Dempsey "played a splendid positional game at full-back and Wilfred Brimble opened up the play with speed and judgment". Mortimer Stephens scored twice "from passing runs". It was said that Bill McKenzie in the inside backs was one of the best in that position in Auckland. In Mt Albert's 8–0 win over Ponsonby the scores were level 0–0 at halftime. The ground was deep in mud over much of it with most of the play limited to the forwards dribbling the ball over the ground to move down the field. Ponsonby gained a lot of possession in the second half and Des Williams (halfback) and Pat Young at first five eighth combined well. Edgar Morgan led the forwards who "hammered away at the Mount Albert line, but could not finish off their efforts". The game then turned and Mt Albert took over in the final stages with Roy Hardgrave playing "at his best, and his solo try, the result of a smart interception and a 50yds dash, was the highlight of the game", the pass he intercepted was from Brian Riley to George Funnell. Hardgrave had debuted for Newton in 1924 aged 16 and was now in his 16th season of senior rugby league. He had played over 360 senior games in New Zealand and Europe and scored over 265 tries. In their forwards Jack Tristram and Martin Hansen were outstanding. Marist dominated Manukau winning 28 to 6. Manukau's only points came from three penalties to Cyril Wiberg in the first half who played well at fullback. For Marist, Kenneth Finlayson secured them a wealth of possession from the scrums with Ken Nicholson playing well on debut for Marist at halfback. The Marist five eighths, Gerry Hughes and Jimmy Chalmers "frequently carved gaps in the defence". Jimmy Matthews and Ray Halsey on the wingers benefited with Halsey scoring a try and Matthews getting two. City and North Shore fought out a 2–2 draw. City debuted George Raisbeck at halfback "who was sharpness personified and threw out splendid passes to his supports". Raisbeck was described as "probably the smallest halfback in the senior grade". In their forwards Bill Jackson, J.A. Thompson, and Claude Kindley "showed up well". For North Shore, G Brown played well at fullback while Robert Cheater showed "speed and tackling ability on the wing" and the veteran Vincent Axmann played "a good game behind the scrum". Axmann had debuted in senior rugby league for City Rovers in 1932.

12 August	City	2-2 (2-0)	North Shore	Carlaw Park 1
3:00	Pen: Jack Silva		Pen: G Brown	Referee: Jack Donovan

12 August	Newton	9-0 (3-0)	Richmond	Carlaw Park 1
1:30	Try: Mortimer Stephens 2, Jack Taylor			Referee: Roy Otto

12 August	Mount Albert	8-0 (0-0)	Ponsonby	Carlaw Park 2
3:00	Try: Roy Hardgrave, Joseph Gunning; Con: Bruce Donaldson			Referee: Stuart Billman

12 August	Marist	28-6 (12-6)	Manukau	Carlaw Park 2
1:30	Try: Billy Grotte, Ray Halsey, Gerry Hughes, Jimmy Matthews 2, Kenneth Finlayson; Con: John Anderson 3 Pen: John Anderson 2		Pen: Cyril Wiberg 3	Referee: George Kelly

==== Round 18 ====
Despite the fact that Mount Albert had secured the championship the league decided to play the final two rounds to find the runner up. In many seasons the competition would have concluded when the champion was found but a proper runner up was needed to play in the Stormont Shield final against Mount Albert in the event that they also won the Roope Rooster. North Shore beat Manukau to take second place with 21 points ahead of Newton on 19. The Richmond v Ponsonby match did not take place as the result could not have any bearing on second place.

19 August	Newton	15-2 (5-0)	Manukau	Carlaw Park 1
3:00	Try: Jack Taylor, Bill McKenzie, Cyril Blacklaws; Con: Wilfred Brimble 2 Pen: S Anderson		Pen: George Nepia	Referee: Stuart Billman

19 August	North Shore	7-6	Papakura	Carlaw Park 1
1:30	Try: Tom Field; Con: Coutts; Pen: Coutts		Try: Craig Smith, Trevor Hosken	Referee: Jack Hawkes

19 August	Mount Albert	18-9 (15-7)	City	Carlaw Park 2
3:00	Try: J Donnelly, Martin Hansen 2, Joseph Gunning; Con: Bruce Donaldson 2 Pen: Bruce Donaldson		Try: A Smith; Pen: John Magee 2, Jack Silva	Referee: George Kelly

=== Roope Rooster ===
==== Round 1 ====
Mt Albert continued the form which had won them the championship beating Newton 8–0. The fullbacks, H McLachlan (Mt Albert), and Claude Dempsey (Newton) played very well with both "unerring in their fielding and both kicked with good length and judgment". On the wing for the winners Roy Hardgrave "was the outstanding three quarter of the game, and is the best wing in New Zealand, despite the fact that he is now in the veteran stage". Hugh Brady returned to the Newton side since he last played for them in June, 1936 "and showed form of the kind that won him representative honours in other seasons". W Walker the Mt Albert halfback and Wilfred Brimble the Newton halfback each gave "a good exhibition" with it said of Brimble that he "is the best attacking half in the game". In the forwards Cyril Blacklaws and Maurice Quirke were Newton's best while Walter Cameron "gave his best display in Auckland to date" for Mt Albert. The game became heated in the second half with several instances "of punching and kicking" being allowed to go before Mt Albert captain Martin Hansen was sent from the field by referee Roy Otto. Like in the other game, the Ponsonby - Marist match featured fine fullback play. This time by Martin for Ponsonby and Bill Glover for Marist. Reginald Haslam returned to the Marist side since June 17 but the usual centre three quarter played as a prop "where his leadership and 14 stone weight were an asset". Huck Flannagan hooked well for Ponsonby with Edgar Morgan also playing well, however they missed the "fast raiding" of Clarrie Petersen who was not available. In muddy conditions Richmond beat City 12–7. The most effective form of attacking was shown by dribbling rushes by Bill Jackson and John Magee. George Raisbeck played a "fine game" for City at halfback but when he sent his backs away the movements broke down though overall Jack Silva in the five eighths was their best back "initiating many moves and showing commendable enterprise". For Richmond, Merv Devine, Leo Davis, and Jack McLeod "were always on the ball" in the forwards, while Charles Webb, Abbie Graham, and Maurice Potter in the inside backs combined well. Papakura had to defend well at the end of their game to hang on to their two-point win. A Gray, "a new player for Papakura was one of the best backs in the side" playing in the five eighths. For North Shore their best forward was Tom Fields "who was fast and reliable" along with Condon and the veteran Arthur Sowter now in his eighth season having played over 90 first grade matches. For Papakura in the forwards B Bentley on debut "played a sterling game" until he went off injured late in the match. William Francis who had come on to replace the injured Holmes in the first half also played well.

26 August	Mount Albert	8-0 (8-0)	Newton	Carlaw Park 1
3:00	Try: Roy Hardgrave, Joseph Gunning; Con: Bruce Donaldson			Referee: Roy Otto

26 August	Marist	7-3	Ponsonby	Carlaw Park 1
1:30	Try: Ray Halsey; Con: Billy Grotte; Pen: Billy Grotte		Try: Brian Riley	Referee: Owen Chalmers

26 August	Richmond	11-7	City	Carlaw Park 2
3:00	Try: Maurice Potter, Abbie Graham, Andrew Kronfeld; Con: Charles Webb		Try: A Smith; Pen: Jack Silva	Referee: Jack Donovan

26 August	Papakura	7-5	North Shore	Carlaw Park 2
1:30	Try: Wright; Con: J McInnes; Pen: J McInnes		Try: Arthur Sowter; Con: G Brown	Referee: Ken McIvor

==== Round 2 ====
2 September	Manukau	27-12 (8-12)	Papakura	Carlaw Park 1
1:30	Try: Steve Watene, P Awhitu, J Marsh, Joseph Hapi, J Gregory, Walter Brimble, Cyril Wiberg; Con: George Nepia 3		Try: F Anderson, J McInnes; Con: J McInnes 2 Pen: J McInnes	Referee: George Kelly

==== Semifinals ====
9 September	Mount Albert	22-21 (12-19)	Richmond	Carlaw Park 1
3:00	Try: Joseph Gunning, Donnelly, Roy Hardgrave, Bruce Donaldson; Con: Bruce Donaldson 2 Pen: Bruce Donaldson 3		Try: Maurice Metcalfe, Alf Broadhead, Abbie Graham; Con: Charles Webb 3 Pen: Charles Webb 3	Referee: George Kelly

9 September	Marist	31-15	Manukau	Carlaw Park 1
1:30	Try: Jimmy Matthews 3, Cliff Hudson 2, Gordon Midgley, Len Barchard; Con: John Anderson 5		Try: Freddie Maguire, P Awhitu, P Kauhoa; Con: Cyril Wiberg; Pen: Steve Watene 2	Referee: Stuart Billman

==== Final ====
16 September	Marist	13-11	Mount Albert	Carlaw Park 1
3:00	Try: John Anderson, Billy Grotte, Gordon Midgley; Con: John Anderson; Pen: John Anderson		Try: Bruce Donaldson; Con: Bruce Donaldson; Pen: Bruce Donaldson 3	Referee: Ken McIvor

=== Phelan Shield ===
The Phelan Shield was played for by teams who were defeated in the first round of the Roope Rooster knockout competition.

==== Round 1 ====
2 September	City	9-3	North Shore	Carlaw Park 2
3:00	Try: Jack Silva, George Raisbeck, A Smith		Try: G Brown	Referee: Owen Chalmers

2 September	Newton	16-14	Ponsonby	Carlaw Park 2
1:30	Try: M Housham, R Proctor, Mortimer Stephens, Cyril Blacklaws; Con: S Anderson, Wilfred Brimble		Try: Wilfred Dormer, W Briggs, Saunders, Carr; Con: Edgar Morgan	Referee: Stuart Billman

==== Round 2 ====
9 September	Papakura	12-14	Newton	Prince Edward Park, Papakura
3:00	Try: John Fogarty, Trevor Hosken; Con: J McInnes 2 Pen: J Mcinnes		Try: Linley Sanders 2, Hugh Brady, Simpson; Drop: Claude Dempsey	Referee: Roy Otto

==== Semifinals ====
16 September	City	21-9	Newton	Carlaw Park 1
1:30	Try: A Smith, George Raisbeck, Leslie Wehner, James Brassey, Owen Hughes; Con: A Smith 2, John Magee		Try: R Proctor; Con: S Anderson; Pen: S Anderson 2	Referee: T Evans

16 September	Richmond	26-16	Manukau	Carlaw Park 2
3:00	Try: Abbie Graham 2, Merv Devine 2, Maurice Potter 2 Con: Charles Webb 4		Try: Harris 2, J Gregory, Steve Watene; Con: Cyril Wiberg 2	Referee: Jack Donovan

==== Final ====
City won the Phelan Shield for the first time in their history. It was the first club trophy of any significance since they won the championship in 1925. The scores were level 7–7 at halftime. In the City backs A Smith played a good game and contributed nine points through a try, two conversions and a penalty. His try came when he ran 75 yards to score. In the five eighths Owen Hughes and Jack Silva outside him "showed enterprise on attack and defended soundly". Their forwards "never let up" with the most prominent being John Magee, Leslie Wehner, Thompson, and Jack Airey. The Richmond forwards also played well, with "hard workers" being Jack McLeod, Merv Devine, Leo Davis, Alf Broadhead, and Hermes Hadley. The Richmond backs regularly changed position which did not help them and Williams at halfback, Abbie Graham at centre and wing, Trevor Bramley on the wing and at fullback were their best.

30 September	City	15-12 (7-7)	Richmond	Carlaw Park 1
1:30	Try: Herbert Thompson, A Smith, Owen Hughes; Con: A Smith 2 Pen: A Smith		Try: Abbie Graham, Merv Devine; Con: Edgar Takle 2 Pen: Charles Webb	Referee: Jack Hawkes

=== Stormont Shield (champion of champions) ===
==== Final ====
Malcolm Cato kicked a drop goal for Mount Albert after recently having switched from the rugby code. He went overseas to join the war effort in early 1941 and was killed in an aircraft accident on July 16, 1942, aged 25.

23 September	Mount Albert	21-9 (7-0)	Marist	Carlaw Park 1
3:00	Try: Roy Hardgrave 3, Martin Hansen, Bruce Donaldson; Con: Bruce Donaldson 2 Drop: Malcolm Cato		Try: Jimmy Matthews, Gordon Midgley, Kenneth Finlayson	Referee: Stuart Billman

=== Seven-a-side tournament ===
On April 8 a seven-a-side tournament was held at Carlaw Park between the senior teams prior to the Eastern Suburbs XIII match against Marist.

	Date		Score		Score	Venue
Section 1, Round 1	8 April	Papakura	WBD	Manukau	LBD	Carlaw Park 1, 1:30
		Richmond	18	City	3	Carlaw Park 1, 1:45
		Mount Albert	29	Newton	0	Carlaw Park 1, 2:00
		Ponsonby	21	North Shore	3	Carlaw Park 1, 2:15
Section 1, Round 2		Richmond	16	Papakura	0	Carlaw Park
		Ponsonby	13	Mount Albert	10	Carlaw Park
Section 2, Round 1		Richmond	11	City	8	Carlaw Park 2, 1:30
		Mount Albert	WBD	Manukau	LBD	Carlaw Park 2, 1:45
		Newton	18	North Shore	0	Carlaw Park 2, 2:00
Section 2, Round 2		Ponsonby	8	Richmond	5	Carlaw Park
Section 1 Semifinal		Ponsonby	21	Richmond	0	Carlaw Park
Section 2 Semifinal		Newton	25	Mount Albert	5	Carlaw Park
Final		Ponsonby	23	Newton	0	Carlaw Park

=== Top try scorers and point scorers ===
Top try scorers
Rk	Player	Team	Games	Tries
1	Roy Hardgrave	Mount Albert	20	16
2	Jimmy Matthews	Marist	17	13
3=	Joseph Gunning	Mount Albert	17	11
3=	Gordon Midgley	Marist	13	11
3=	Mortimer Stephens	Newton	19	11
6=	Bruce Donaldson	Mount Albert	18	9
6=	Abbie Graham	Richmond	15	9
8=	Ray Halsey	Marist	16	8
8=	Linley Sanders	Newton	19	8
10=	Jack Brodrick	Manukau	14	7
10=	A Smith	City	14	7
10=	Dave Solomon	Richmond	8	7

Top point scorers
Rk	Player	Team	G	T	C	P	DG	Pts
1	Bruce Donaldson	Mount Albert	18	9	29	16	1	119
2	John Anderson	Marist	19	5	17	18	0	85
3	Jack Smith	North Shore	11	2	18	16	1	76
4	J McInnes	Papakura	19	5	13	16	0	73
5	Jack Hemi	Manukau	11	1	20	11	0	65
6	Roy Hardgrave	Mount Albert	20	16	0	0	0	48
7	Jimmy Matthews	Marist	17	13	0	0	0	39
8	S Anderson	Newton	14	0	10	9	0	38
9	Wilfred Brimble	Newton	20	1	8	8	0	35
10=	Joseph Gunning	Mount Albert	17	11	0	0	0	33
10=	Gordon Midgley	Marist	13	11	0	0	0	33
10=	Mortimer Stephens	Newton	19	11	0	0	0	33

== Senior reserve competitions ==
=== Norton Cup standings ===
Team	Pld	W	D	L	F	A	Pts
Richmond Rovers reserves	13	13	0	0	280	33	26
Mount Albert United reserves	15	11	0	4	333	107	22
Ponsonby United reserves	13	10	0	3	192	84	20
City Rovers reserves	14	7	0	7	104	181	14
Marist Old Boys reserves	13	6	1	6	109	150	13
North Shore Albions reserves	12	5	0	7	95	157	10
Papakura reserves	14	4	1	9	118	168	9
Manukau reserves	14	2	0	12	78	227	4
Newton Rangers reserves	12	1	0	11	53	258	2

=== Norton Cup results ===
In round 1 Papakura defaulted to Manukau with it being reported during the week that the team had “suffered seriously from influenza”. Following round 16 Richmond were congratulated on securing the championship. Ponsonby appealed the result suffered in that same round claiming that Richmond had played an ineligible player since the match was a ‘final’. They said that he had played 5 matches for the senior side already so should not have been allowed to play. The league said that the game was not a final and so the player was in order.

	Date		Score		Score	Referee	Venue
Round 1	22 April	Marist	13	City	3	H Tate	Auckland Domain 1, 3:00
-	22 April	Richmond	13	North Shore	3	T Evans	Auckland Domain 1, 1:30
-	22 April	Manukau	WBD	Papakura	LBD	A Pearson	Auckland Domain 3, 3:00
-	22 April	Ponsonby	19	Newton	2	Ken McIvor	Auckland Domain 3, 1:30
Round 2	29 April	Richmond	17	Mount Albert	0	George Kelly	Auckland Domain 2, 3:00
-	29 April	North Shore	15	Manukau	5	Jack Donovan	Auckland Domain 2, 1:30
-	29 April	City	WBD	Newton	LBD	Roy Otto	Auckland Domain 6, 3:00
-	29 April	Marist	8	Papakura	3	A Pearson	Auckland Domain 6, 1:30
Round 3	6 May	Ponsonby	32	City	0	Stuart Billman	Auckland Domain 1, 3:00
-	6 May	Mount Albert	42	Manukau	7	Jack Donovan	Auckland Domain 1, 1:30
-	6 May	Papakura	16	Newton	5	Jack Hawkes	Auckland Domain 5, 3:00
-	6 May	Marist	7	North Shore	3	J Gedye	Auckland Domain 5, 1:30
Round 4	13 May	Ponsonby	?	Papakura	?	A Pearson	Carlaw Park 3, 1:30
-	13 May	Richmond	36	Manukau	0	Maurice Wetherill	Auckland Domain 2, 3:00
-	13 May	Marist	10	Mount Albert	5	A Kinnaird	Auckland Domain 2, 1:30
-	13 May	North Shore	?	Newton	?	George Kelly	Devonport Domain, 1:30
Round 5	20 May	Ponsonby	35	Marist	6	Stuart Billman	Carlaw Park 2, 1:30
-	20 May	Papakura	8	Richmond	44	H Tate	Prince Edward Park, Papakura, 1:30
-	20 May	City	13	Manukau	3	T Evans	Auckland Domain 2, 3:00
-	20 May	Mount Albert	22	North Shore	2	Jack Hawkes	Auckland Domain 2, 1:30
Round 6	27 May	Mount Albert	28	City	7	E Pope	Auckland Domain 5, 3pm
-	27 May	Richmond	20	Ponsonby	0	Stuart Billman	Auckland Domain 5, 1:30
-	27 May	Papakura	14	North Shore	8	J Jones	Auckland Domain 1, 3:00
-	27 May	Newton	7	Manukau	6	E Longville	Auckland Domain 1, 1:30
Round 7	3 June	Richmond	70	Newton	4	Jack Hawkes	Auckland Domain 3, 3:00
-	3 June	Ponsonby	5	Mount Albert	4	Ken McIvor	Auckland Domain 3, 1:30
-	3 June	Marist	14	Manukau	3	A Kinnaird	Auckland Domain 5, 3:00
-	3 June	City	12	North Shore	10	A Barnhill	Auckland Domain 5, 1:30
Round 8	10 June	Marist	24	Newton	2	J Cottingham	Carlaw Park 2, 1:30
-	10 June	Ponsonby	19	Manukau	3	A Smith	Auckland Domain 2, 3:00
-	10 June	Mount Albert	21	Papakura	11	E Korn	Auckland Domain 2, 1:30
-	10 June	Richmond	20	City	3	?	?
Round 9	17 June	Ponsonby	17	North Shore	3	E Korn	Auckland Domain 1, 3:00
-	17 June	Mount Albert	36	Newton	4	A Pearson	Auckland Domain 1, 1:30
-	17 June	City	18	Papakura	13	A Kinnaird	Auckland Domain 5, 3:00
-	17 June	Richmond	22	Marist	5	Stuart Billman	Auckland Domain 5, 1:30
Round 10	24 June	Manukau	5	Papakura	14	A Kinnaird	Waikaraka Park, Onehunga, 1:30
-	24 June	City	13	Marist	5	T Evans	Auckland Domain 2, 1:30
-	24 June	North Shore	?	Richmond	?	H Tate	Auckland Domain 6, 3:00
-	24 June	Ponsonby	26	Newton	12	Roy Otto	Auckland Domain 6, 1:30
Round 11	1 July	Richmond	18	Mount Albert	7	Jack Hawkes	Auckland Domain 2, 3pm
-	1 July	North Shore	11	Manukau	10	A Kinnaird	Auckland Domain 2, 1:30
-	1 July	Marist	5	Papakura	5	Owen Chalmers	Auckland Domain 6, 1:30
-	1 July	City	6	Newton	0	G Barnhill	Auckland Domain 6, 1:30
Round 12	date	Ponsonby	?	Manukau	?	J Gedye	Auckland Domain 1, 1:30
-	8 July	Richmond	8	City	0	J Jones	Auckland Domain 5, 1:30
-	8 July	Mount Albert	21	Papakura	5	A Smith	Outer Domain, 1:30
-	8 July	Newton	?	Marist	?	J O’Shannessy	Victoria Park 2, 3:00
Round 13	13 July	Papakura	18	Newton	8	Jack Hawkes	Auckland Domain 5, 1:30
-	13 July	Ponsonby	22	City	5	Ken McIvor	Auckland Domain 5, 3:00
-	13 July	North Shore	16	Marist	12	Roy Otto	Auckland Domain 3, 3:00
-	13 July	Mount Albert	44	Manukau	4	George Kelly	Auckland Domain 3, 1:30
Round 14	22 July	Richmond	WBD	Manukau	LBD	A Smith	Auckland Domain 2, 3:00
-	22 July	Mount Albert	40	Marist	0	J Jones	Auckland Domain 2, 1:30
-	22 July	Ponsonby	14	Papakura	3	C Korn	Auckland Domain 6, 3:00
-	22 July	North Shore	13	Newton	7	E Pope	Auckland Domain 6, 1:30
Round 15	29 July	Ponsonby	WBD	Marist	LBD	Owen Chalmers	Auckland Domain 1, 3:00
-	29 July	Mount Albert	30	North Shore	0	A Appleton	Auckland Domain 1, 1:30
-	29 July	Richmond	WBD	Papakura	LBD	George Kelly	Auckland Domain 5, 3:00
-	29 July	City	9	Manukau	8	A Pearson	Auckland Domain 2, 1:30
Round 16	5 August	Richmond	12	Ponsonby	3	H Marshall	Carlaw Park 1, 1:30
-	5 August	Mount Albert	19	City	15	George Kelly	Auckland Domain 2, 3:00
-	5 August	North Shore	11	Papakura	8	Stuart Billman	Auckland Domain 6, 3:00
-	5 August	Manukau	24	Newton	2	J O’Shannessey	Auckland Domain 2, 1:30
Round 17	12 August	Richmond	?	Newton	?	J Gedye	Auckland Domain 6, 3:00
-	12 August	North Shore	?	City	?	Arthur Lennie	Auckland Domain 6, 1:30
-	12 August	Marist	?	Manukau	?	Owen Chalmers	Auckland Domain 2, 3:00
-	12 August	Mount Albert	14	Ponsonby	0	Ken Mcivor	Auckland Domain 2, 1:30
Round 18	19 August	Richmond	?	Marist	?	H Tate	Auckland Domain 1, 3:00
-	19 August	City	?	Newton	?	Roy Otto	Auckland Domain 1, 1:30

=== Stallard Cup (knockout competition) ===
Stallard Cup results
	Date		Score		Score	Referee	Venue
Round 1	26 August	Richmond	W	Mount Albert	L	T Evans	Auckland Domain 3, 3:00
-	26 August	Newton	W	Manukau	L	A Ansell	Auckland Domain 3, 1:30
-	26 August	Ponsonby	W	Papakura	L	G Kelly	Auckland Domain 5, 3:00
-	26 August	Otahuhu	W	North Shore	L	H Marshall	Auckland Domain 5, 3:00
Semifinals	2 September	Otahuhu	13	Ponsonby	8	H Tate	Auckland Domain 2, 3:00
-	2 September	Richmond	28	Newton	0	A Ansell	Auckland Domain 6, 3:00
Final	16 September	Richmond	W	Otahuhu	L	Arthur Lennie	Carlaw Park 2, 1:30

== Senior B grade competitions ==
In the Sharman Cup Otahuhu won with Ellerslie runner up. The first round featured a bye for Green Lane as Northcote was not able to field a team until round 2. Several results were not reported in any of the Auckland newspapers though Otahuhu winning the competition was reported.

=== Sharman Cup standings ===
The standings are incomplete as all teams had match scores unreported (Ellerslie x 2), Green Lane (x1), R.V. (x2), Otahuhu (x2), Point Chevalier (x2), and Northcote (x3).

Team	Pld	W	D	L	F	A	Pts
Otahuhu Rovers senior B	8	6	1	1	83	21	13
Ellerslie United senior B	8	6	0	2	123	36	12
Point Chevalier senior B	8	4	0	4	49	53	8
Green Lane senior B	7	3	1	3	53	27	7
R.V. (Harvey & Sons Ltd senior B)	7	1	0	6	27	95	2
Northcote & Birkenhead Ramblers senior B	6	1	0	5	23	100	2

=== Sharman Cup results ===
In their round 3 match the entire Green Lane side walked off the field in protest at the referee's decision. The referee was J. Gedye with the “incident occurring shortly before full time”. Point Chevalier were leading 10–6 at the time. Green Lane players stated later “that the play had been clean and that their action had been taken solely in protest to a decision by the referee”. in round 7 referee K. McIvor called off the match before it started because one of the teams only had 8 players after being “handicapped by influenza and injuries to players”. When dealing with the matter later the control board stated that a match should go ahead provided a team had 7 players and “desired to play”. Otahuhu were congratulated on winning the competition following round 10.

	Date		Score		Score	Referee	Venue
Round 1	29 April	Otahuhu	?	R.V.	?	Ted Mincham	Otahuhu, 3:00
-	29 April	Ellerslie	15	Point Chevalier	0	K McIvor	Auckland Domain, 3:00
Round 2	6 May	Point Chevalier	2	Otahuhu	8	K McIvor	Walker Park, Point Chevalier, 3:00
-	6 May	R.V.	12	Green Lane	10	Ted Mincham	Victoria Park 2, 3:00
-	6 May	Ellerslie	32	Northcote	3	P Merrick	Ellerslie School
Round 3	13 May	Otahuhu	7	Ellerslie	2	H Tate	Otahuhu, 3:00
-	13 May	Green Lane	6	Point Chevalier	10	J Gedye	Green Lane, 3:00
-	13 May	Northcote	?	R.V.	?	K McIvor	Stafford Park, Northcote, 3:00
Round 4	20 May	Green Lane	7	Otahuhu	7	K McIvor	Green Lane, 3:00
-	20 May	Ellerslie	19	R.V.	2	A Kinnaird	Ellerslie Domain, 3:00
-	20 May	Point Chevalier	15	Northcote	3	R Otto	Walker Park, Point Chevalier, 3:00
Round 5	27 May	Point Chevalier	11	R.V.	6	A Pearson	Walker Park, Point Chevalier, 3:00
-	27 May	Green Lane	12	Ellerslie	11	K McIvor	Green Lane, 3:00
-	27 May	Otahuhu	24	Northcote	0	G Kelly	Otahuhu, 3:00
Round 6	3 June	Otahuhu	17	R.V.	2	E Korn	Victoria Park 2, 3:00
-	3 June	Point Chevalier	?	Ellerslie	?	T Evans	Walker Park, Point Chevalier, 3:00
-	3 June	Green Lane	13	Northcote	3	H Tate	Outer Domain, 3:00
Round 7	10 June	Otahuhu	8	Point Chevalier	0	A Pearson	Otahuhu, 3:00
-	10 June	Green Lane	ABN	R.V.	ABN	K McIvor	Green Lane, 3:00
-	10 June	Northcote	7	Ellerslie	13	H Tate	Stafford Park, Northcote, 3:00
Round 8	17 June	Ellerslie	8	Otahuhu	5	K McIvor	Mount Wellington, 3:00
-	17 June	Point Chevalier	3	Green Lane	5	J Jones	Walker Park, Point Chevalier, 3:00
-	17 June	Northcote	7	R.V.	3	E Longville	Victoria Park, 3:00
Round 9	24 June	Otahuhu	7	Green Lane	0	J Hawkes	Otahuhu, 3:00
-	24 June	Ellerslie	23	R.V.	0	Frank Delgrosso	Outer Domain, 3:00
-	24 June	Northcote	?	Point Chevalier	?	E Longville	Stafford Park, Northcote, 3:00
Round 10	1 July	Point Chevalier	8	R.V.	2	J Cottingham	Western Springs, 3:00
-	1 July	Ellerslie	?	Green Lane	?	Frank Delgrosso	Ellerslie Domain, 3:00
-	1 July	Otahuhu	?	Northcote	?	T Evans	Green Lane, 3:00

=== Walmsley Shield (knockout competition) ===
As in previous seasons due to the short nature of the championship competition the Walmsley Shield knockout competition was played over one full round. The matches were played at neutral venues. In round 4 R.V. defaulted their match and withdrew from the competition owing to illness and injuries. The final was due to be played in late August but Otahuhu were entering the reserve grade knockout competition and so Ellerslie agreed to postpone the Walmesley Shield final until a later date which was ultimately September 9. Otahuhu won the final 5-3 which was played at Manukau. Northcote won the Foster Shield, presumably for finishing the 5 match round in first place (prior to the final).

==== Walmesley Shield results ====
	Date		Score		Score	Referee	Venue
Round 1	15 July	Otahuhu	WBD	R.V.	LBD	E Longville	Green Lane, 3:00
-	29 July	Ellerslie	?	Point Chevalier	?	E Pope	Western Springs, 3:15
-	29 July	Green Lane	?	Northcote	?	G Barnhill	Walker Park, Point Chevalier, 3:00
Round 2	29 July	Otahuhu	13	Point Chevalier	3	G Barnhill	Green Lane, 3:00
-	29 July	R.V.	?	Green Lane	?	H Marshall	Outer Domain, 3:00
-	29 July	Ellerslie	?	Northcote	?	Frank Delgrosso	Victoria Park, 3:00
Round 3	5 August	Otahuhu	5	Ellerslie	5	Frank Delgrosso	Manukau, 3:00
-	5 August	Green Lane	?	Point Chevalier	?	E Pope	Avondale Racecourse, 3:00
-	5 August	Northcote	?	R.V.	?	A Pearson	Walker Park, Point Chevalier, 3:00
Round 4	12 August	Otahuhu	?	Green Lane	?	H Tate	Mount Wellington, 3:00
-	12 August	Ellerslie	WBD	R.V.	LBD	Jack Hawkes	Green Lane, 3:00
-	12 August	Point Chevalier	10	Northcote	6	T Evans	Western Springs, 3:00
Round 5	19 August	Ellerslie	24	Green Lane	0	Arthur Lennie	Manukau, 3:00
-	19 August	Otahuhu	38	Northcote	0	T Evans	Green Lane, 3:00
Final	9 September	Otahuhu	5	Ellerslie	3	Jack Hawkes	Manukau, 3:00

== Other club matches and lower grades ==
=== Lower grade clubs ===
On October 4 the junior control board advised that Edmund Walter Garrod of the Marist club's third grade team had won the Dickson medal for the most improved player.

=== 3rd Grade ===
The 3rd Grade was split into 2 sections due to the number of teams. Otahuhu won the championship after beating Richmond 16–5 on September 23 in the final. Otahuhu had won section 1 and Richmond had won section 2. Otahuhu also won the third grade knockout when they beat Newton 36–4.

==== Section 1 ====
After four heavy defeats the Newmarket team was transferred into the 4th Grade in early June.

Team	Pld	W	D	L	F	A	Pts
Otahuhu Rovers	16	12	0	0	342	21	24
Mount Albert United	16	7	1	3	125	54	15
Marist Old Boys	16	7	0	4	184	61	14
City Rovers A	14	6	1	0	64	81	13
Newton Rangers	15	3	0	4	65	117	6
Papakura	15	2	0	7	34	68	4
Ellerslie United	14	2	0	9	54	141	4
Manukau	16	2	0	9	34	174	4
Newmarket	4	0	0	4	4	189	0

==== Section 2 ====
Team	Pld	W	D	L	F	A	Pts
Richmond Rovers	16	6	0	0	121	27	12
R.V.	16	7	2	1	97	32	15
Glenora	16	4	0	2	121	26	8
City Rovers B	15	4	0	4	48	69	8
North Shore Albions	16	2	2	2	51	37	6
Ponsonby	15	2	1	5	52	74	5
Avondale	16	2	1	3	38	97	5
Northcote & Birkenhead Ramblers	16	2	0	3	55	54	4
Point Chevalier	16	0	1	9	39	206	1

=== 4th Grade ===
Gillett Cup Won jointly by City Rovers and Mount Albert United who drew 11–11 in the final on October 14. City won the knockout competition beating North Shore though the actual score was not reported. Newmarket 3rd Grade team was transferred into the 4th Grade in early June after struggling in the higher grade. R.V. withdrew mid-season, while Newton played in the opening round and then randomly again mid season.

Team	Pld	W	D	L	F	A	Pts
City Rovers	23	17	1	2	178	42	35
Mount Albert	21	15	1	2	235	64	31
Richmond Rovers	21	14	0	2	400	51	28
Ponsonby United	20	9	0	7	161	127	18
Papakura	19	5	1	3	65	51	11
Otahuhu Rovers	19	5	1	9	92	126	11
Northcote & Birkenhead Ramblers	17	3	1	8	35	118	7
Manukau	16	3	1	8	38	211	7
Green Lane	19	3	0	8	51	85	6
North Shore Albions	19	3	0	10	37	217	6
Newmarket	13	0	0	9	11	126	0
R.V.	11	0	0	8	4	85	0
Newton Rangers	2	0	0	2	2	6	0

=== 5th Grade ===
Avondale won the competition following an 8-3 win against Point Chevalier on August 19. Ellerslie won the knockout competition when they beat Richmond in the final on September 16. The Manukau side withdrew 5 weeks into the season and seemingly joined the 5th grade competition the following weekend.

Team	Pld	W	D	L	F	A	Pts
Avondale	15	11	1	1	49	19	23
Newmarket	15	9	0	3	169	42	18
Richmond Rovers	16	8	2	1	114	27	18
Marist Old Boys	14	4	0	5	127	39	8
Ellerslie United	15	2	2	4	77	44	6
Point Chevalier	15	2	1	6	42	81	5
Papakura	15	0	0	6	16	47	0
Glenora	15	0	0	9	10	223	0
Manukau	4	0	0	3	13	95	0

=== 6th Grade ===
Richmond beat Otahuhu 8–0 in the championship final while City won the knockout competition though it was not played in a knockout format as all seven teams played each other in a six-round competition.

Team	Pld	W	D	L	F	A	Pts
Richmond Rovers	12	9	1	1	124	32	19
Otahuhu Rovers	11	3	2	3	51	67	8
North Shore Albions	11	4	2	0	81	22	10
City Rovers	12	3	1	2	35	40	7
Ellerslie United	12	3	0	6	70	69	6
Mount Albert United	12	1	1	7	38	111	3
Manukau	7	0	1	3	8	66	0

=== 7th Grade ===
Papakura won the knockout competition with Ponsonby, Richmond, and Point Chevalier finishing equal second in the knockout.

Team	Pld	W	D	L	F	A	Pts
Richmond Rovers	10	7	0	3	105	23	14
Papakura	10	3	2	2	49	39	8
Point Chevalier	10	3	0	4	48	62	6
Ponsonby United	10	2	2	2	48	17	6
City Rovers	10	0	2	3	3	17	4
Northcote & Birkenhead Ramblers	9	0	0	4	10	105	0

=== Schoolboys ===
==== Seniors (Lou Rout Trophy) ====
The second half of the season saw very few results reported in the newspapers so the standings are incomplete. On September 9 the only match played was between Richmond and Mount Albert and following the game it was reported that Newton had won the championship. It was most likely a make up game which Richmond presumably lost, handing Newton the championship. Pt Chevalier fielded a team in the opening week but then not beyond that. Avondale played for 7 rounds before withdrawing. On October 7 Richmond defeated Newton to win the knockout competition.

Team	Pld	W	D	L	F	A	Pts
Newton Rangers	14	6	3	2	124	19	15
Richmond Rovers	13	7	1	2	120	23	15
Otahuhu Rovers	14	5	3	1	134	13	13
Mount Albert United	15	3	3	2	50	23	9
Northcote & Birkenhead Ramblers	10	2	0	3	16	44	4
Ellerslie United	14	1	0	6	12	71	2
North Shore Albions	13	0	0	6	3	173	0
Avondale	6	0	0	2	0	59	0

==== Intermediate (Newport and Eccles Memorial Shield) ====
Richmond won section A while Ellerslie won section B. The two teams met in the championship final on September 9 with Ellerslie winning. Ponsonby won the knockout competition beating North Shore 5–0 in the final on September 30. Ponsonby and Ellerslie then met in the 'champion of champions' game with Ponsonby winning 5–0 on October 7.

===== Section A =====
- only seven of Richmond's results were reported though they obviously had several more victories to finish ahead of Ponsonby.

Team	Pld	W	D	L	F	A	Pts
Richmond Rovers	16	6	0	1	149	5	12
Ponsonby United	16	9	1	0	115	3	19
Newton Rangers	16	3	1	5	15	53	7
Pt Chevalier	16	1	2	1	6	8	4
Mount Albert United	16	0	0	6	3	88	0
Avondale	16	0	0	6	0	131	0

===== Section B =====
Team	Pld	W	D	L	F	A	Pts
Ellerslie United	14	10	0	0	188	5	20
Newmarket	14	5	0	2	92	25	10
St Patricks	16	5	0	3	74	25	10
Green Lane	15	3	0	4	64	53	6
Manukau	16	0	0	8	5	230	0
North Shore Albions	15	0	0	6	5	90	0

==== Junior ====
Green Lane won the championship on September 2 following an 8–3 win over Newmarket. Green Lane also won the knockout competition when they beat Northcote on September 30. Green Lane only had five results reported (all wins) and as they won the championship they would have had several other wins unreported.

Team	Pld	W	D	L	F	A	Pts
Green Lane	13	5	0	0	114	3	10
Newmarket	14	6	1	1	80	25	13
Manukau	15	3	1	2	57	14	7
Northcote	13	2	0	2	34	16	4
Glenora	12	1	1	2	3	15	3
St Patricks	13	1	0	6	6	89	2
Manukau	13	0	0	8	6	158	0

=== Schoolboy gala ===
A schoolboy gala was held at Carlaw Park On October 14. It featured the final of the fourth grade between Mount Albert and City which resulted in an 11-all draw, along with the crowning of the schoolboys’ queen which was Miss Dick. Other events were held such as running races, goal kicking competitions and a tug-o-war.

=== Other notable matches ===
==== Portland-Hikurangi Combined v Newton ====
Newton were the first Auckland team to send a side to play in Northland. They won an entertaining game 28–20 after leading 16–0 at halftime. It was said that the game "was one of the best seen in Whangarei for some years" and better than those seen against Auckland sides the previous year. In the first half Wilfred Brimble left the field injured after earlier having scored a try. He was replaced by Gibson. The local side rearranged their backline at halftime with first five eighth Tommy Wallbank who had been "excellent" up to this point being replaced by Tautari who went to halfback, with Raisbeck moving from halfback into Wallbank's position. The move was made to give the selectors a chance to see other players. S Anderson debuted for Newton after having transferred where he had been a member of the St George club in the lower grades. McConnell was injured in the forwards for the local side and was replaced by Len Payne who was actually from the City (Whangarei) side.

20 May	Portland-Hikurangi Combined	20-28 (0-16)	Newton	Jubilee Park, Whangarei
3:00	Try: Springfellow 2, Flesher 2 Con: Claude Hamilton 3 Pen: Claude Hamilton		Try: Wilfred Brimble, Bill McKenzie, Donald McKenzie, H Kendall, Mortimer Stephens, Joseph Ginders, Claude Dempsey, Linley Sanders; Con: Linley Sanders, S Anderson	Referee: J Hill

==== City-Portland v Papakura ====
Former New Zealand player Frank Pickrang who had played for Manukau in 1936 and then Ponsonby in 1937 and 1938 after switching codes, turned out for the combined City-Portland side. Late in the first half Galloway, playing on the wing for Papakura knocked himself out in scoring a try. He was also not wearing boots and was playing in his socks. For the combined side Harold Parkes came on at halftime for Vaughan and he too was not wearing boots.

3 June	City-Portland	12-21 (3-16)	Papakura	Jubilee Park, Whangarei
3:00	Try: Murray 2, Vince Payne, Bowyer		Try: Fitzpatrick, W Cooke, Harold Milliken, Galloway, Gibson; Con: W Cooke, J McInnes 2	Referee: E Bowyer

==== Manukau v Huntly District ====
The South Auckland (Waikato) champion side, Huntly travelled to Onehunga to play Manukau who had a bye. Manukau was missing Jack Hemi, Jack Brodrick, and Angus Gault. Manukau took a hard-fought win where "splendid forward play was a feature of the game". The Huntly side had recently won four matches against Auckland sides. Tommy Chase scored twice for Manukau while Mihaka Panapa scored their other try. For Huntly, Brooks and Raynor scored tries with fullback T Shaw kicking a penalty. George Nēpia "gave a fine display at fullback" and saved his side from defeat with his defence. Tommy Chase on the wing was said to be the "outstanding back on the ground".

17 June	Manukau	9-8	Huntly District	Waikaraka Park, Onehunga
3:00	Try: Tommy Chase 2, Mihaka Panapa		Try: J Brooks, L Raynor; Pen: T Shaw

==== Kensington & City Combined v Richmond reserves ====
16 July	Kensington & City combined	0-13	Richmond reserves	Jubilee Park, Whangarei
3:00			Try: Sale, Purvis, Abbie Graham; Con: Edgar Takle 2	Referee: J Hill

==== City (Whangarei) v Newton reserves ====
29 July	City (Whangarei)	9-29	Newton reserves	Jubilee Park, Whangarei
3:00	Try: Gough, Hirtzell, Lenne		Try: Linley Sanders 3, R Proctor, Edgar Tredea, M Housham, Preston; Con: Linley Sanders 3, Hill

Other Matches
	Date		Score		Score	Referee	Venue
Friendly Match	22 July	Rotorua	13	City	12	-	Rotorua
Friendly Match	2 September	Rotorua	14	Ellerslie Senior B	8	-	Rotorua
Friendly Match	30 September	Rotorua	31	Ponsonby	22	-	Rotorua

== Representative fixtures ==
=== South Auckland (Waikato) Māori v Tāmaki (Auckland Māori) ===
There were no match reports with only the score stated as being a 19–8 win for the South Auckland team. It was also remarked that George Nēpia had played brilliantly in the game.

28 May	South Auckland (Waikato) Māori	19-8	Tāmaki (Auckland Māori)	Davies Park, Huntly
3:00	Try: Unknown		Try: Unknown	Referee: Stuart Billman

=== Tāmaki (Auckland Māori) v Auckland Pākehā ===
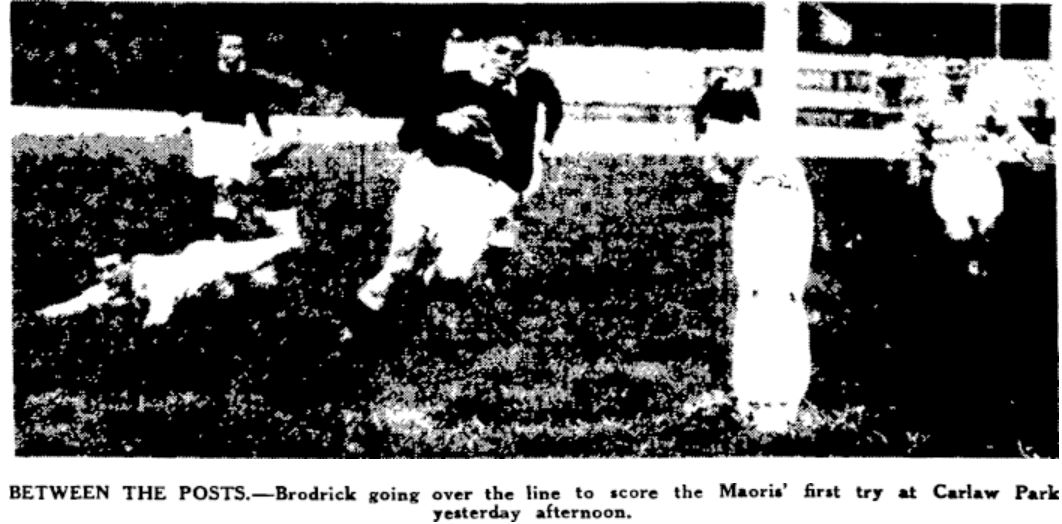
Jack Brodrick scoring for Auckland Māori.

Ernie Asher was the selector for the Auckland Māori side while R. Doble selected the Auckland Pākehā team. Richmond were playing Marist on the same afternoon and so no players from either team were chosen for the match. Jack Hemi kicked a penalty goal from a yard inside his own half. Tommy Chase was said to have played a brilliant game on the wing for the Māori side.

5 June	Auckland Māori	19-15	Auckland Pākehā	Carlaw Park 1
3:00	Try: Jack Hemi 2, Jack Brodrick; Con: Bruce Donaldson 2 Pen: Bruce Donaldson 2, Jack Hemi		Try: Roy Nurse, Arthur McInnarney, Bob Banham; Con: Des Herring, Verdun Scott; Pen: Verdun Scott

=== South Auckland (Waikato) v Tāmaki (Auckland Māori) ===
There were no match reports so it is unknown what the score was or who took the field exactly.

11 June	South Auckland (Waikato)	?-?	Tāmaki (Auckland Māori)	Davies Park, Huntly
3:00	Try: Unknown		Try: Unknown

=== Inter Island match ===
Wally Tittleton was chosen as the North Island captain while Rex King captained the South Island.

8 July	North Island	35-13	South Island	Carlaw Park 1
3:00	Try: Roy Nurse 2, Wally Tittleton, Laurie Mills, Dave Solomon 2, Pita Ririnui; Con: Jack Hemi 3, Dave Solomon; Pen: Jack Hemi 3		Try: Ces Davison, J Clarke, Rex King; Con: Ces Davison; Pen: Ces Davison	Attendance: 15,000; Referee: Ralph Otto

=== New Zealand Probables v New Zealand Possibles ===
Jack Smith (Possibles) and Bob Banham (Probables) captained the sides.

8 July	NZ Probables	31-17	NZ Possibles	Carlaw Park 1
1:30	Try: R Chinnery, Bob Banham, Bert Leatherbarrow 2, Joseph Gunning, Clarrie Petersen, R Barnard; Con: T Shaw, Tommy Chase 4		Try: Bruce Donaldson, Brian Riley, Peter Mahima; Con: Jack Smith 3 Pen: Jack Smith	Referee: G Kelly

=== New Zealand Probables v New Zealand Possibles ===
11 July	NZ Probables	27-18	NZ Possibles	Carlaw Park 1
3:00	Try: Tommy Chase 2, N Kiely, George Mitchell, W Bellamy; Con: T Shaw 2, Tommy Chase, Verdun Scott; Pen: Tommy Chase, Verdun Scott		Try: Bill McKenzie, Joe Cootes, Walter Cameron, Arthur McInnarney; Con: Jack Smith, Robert Marshall; Pen: Jack Smith

=== Auckland v South Auckland (Waikato) ===
Stan Prentice was named to coach the Auckland side. George Nepia was originally selected for Auckland but withdrew.

5 August	Auckland	26-17	South Auckland (Waikato)	Carlaw Park 1
3:00	Try: Roy Hardgrave 3, Bruce Donaldson, Des Herring, Clarrie Peterson; Con: Bruce Donaldson 3 Pen: Bruce Donaldson		Try: E Tukere, L Raynor, N Gunn; Con: L Powell 2 Pen: L Powell, T Shaw	Referee: O Chalmers

=== Tāmaki (Auckland Māori) v Bay of Plenty Māori (Waitangi Shield) ===
This match was originally scheduled to be played on August 17 but was postponed due to the state of Carlaw Park which had been badly affected by the wet weather.

24 August	Tāmaki	3-3	Bay of Plenty Māori	Carlaw Park 1
3:00	Try: H Kendall		Try: Wilson	Referee: A Lennie

=== Auckland v Wellington ===
For Wellington Percy Herkt played after transferring for work reasons earlier in the season from the Papakura club.

2 September	Auckland	23-9	Wellington	Carlaw Park 1
3:00	Try: Roy Nurse 2, Bill McKenzie, Bruce Donaldson, Walter Cameron; Con: Bruce Donaldson 3 Pen: Bruce Donaldson		Try: H Edie, Percy Herkt, Carroll	Referee: W.E. Simpson

=== Auckland Pākehā v Tāmaki (Auckland Māori) ===
There were no players included in either side from Marist, City, or Richmond, with the later two teams playing in the Phelan Shield final which was the curtain-raiser. During the game Frank Bell came on for the injured Ernie Pinches (Mt Albert). Bell had played for the Eastern Suburbs side which had toured New Zealand and had come to Auckland to join the Ponsonby side.

30 September	Auckland Pākehā	15-12	Tāmaki (Auckland Māori)	Carlaw Park 1
3:00	Try: Basil Cranch, Roy Nurse, Des Herring; Con: Claude Dempsey, Des Herring; Pen: J Cato		Try: Bruce Donaldson, Steve Watene; Con: George Nepia; Pen: George Nepia, Bruce Donaldson	Referee: Owen Chalmers

=== Auckland representative matches played and scoring ===
No	Name	Club Team	Play	Tries	Con	Pen	Points
1	Bruce Donaldson	Mount Albert	2	2	6	2	22
2	Roy Hardgrave	Mount Albert	2	3	0	0	9
3	Roy Nurse	Ponsonby	2	2	0	0	6
4	Bill McKenzie	Newton	2	1	0	0	3
4	Walter Cameron	Mount Albert	2	1	0	0	3
4	Clarrie Peterson	Ponsonby	2	1	0	0	3
4	Des Herring	Mount Albert	1	1	0	0	3
8	Claude Dempsey	Newton	2	0	0	0	0
8	Abbie Graham	Richmond	2	0	0	0	0
8	Huck Flanagan	Ponsonby	2	0	0	0	0
8	Richard Shadbolt	Mount Albert	2	0	0	0	0
8	Wilfred Brimble	Newton	1	0	0	0	0
8	Alf Broadhead	Richmond	1	0	0	0	0
8	Merv Devine	Richmond	1	0	0	0	0
8	Joseph Gunning	Mount Albert	1	0	0	0	0
8	W Walker	Mount Albert	1	0	0	0	0

=== Tāmaki (Auckland Māori) representative matches played and scoring ===
The Māori side played in 5 matches in total. The first match was at Davies Park in Huntly and there was no match report. That match and several others had squads published but not match day teams so all squad players have been credited with playing regardless of whether they did or not. There was no scoring reported in two of the games so the scoring is incomplete.

No	Name	Club Team	Play	Tries	Con	Pen	Points
1	Bruce Donaldson	Mount Albert	3	1	2	3	13
2	Jack Hemi	Manukau	2	2	0	1	8
3	George Nepia	Manukau	4	0	1	1	4
4	Jack Brodrick	Manukau	3	1	0	0	3
4	H Kendall	Newton	4	1	0	0	3
4	Steve Watene	Manukau	1	1	0	0	3
7	S Hapeta	North Shore	5	0	0	0	0
7	Peter Mahima	Manukau	4	0	0	0	0
7	Jack Tristram	Mount Albert	4	0	0	0	0
7	Tommy Chase	Manukau	3	0	0	0	0
7	Martin Hansen	Mount Albert	3	0	0	0	0
7	Hawea Mataira	City	3	0	0	0	0
7	P Awhitu	Manukau	3	0	0	0	0
7	Waka McLeod	Manukau	2	0	0	0	0
7	Jackie Rata	City	3	0	0	0	0
7	Pita Ririnui	Manukau	3	0	0	0	0
7	M Housham	Newton	2	0	0	0	0
7	R Proctor	Newton	2	0	0	0	0
7	Ted Brimble	Newton	2	0	0	0	0
7	Walter Brimble	Manukau	2	0	0	0	0
7	W Briggs	Ponsonby	2	0	0	0	0
7	J Marsh	Manukau	2	0	0	0	0
7	Ratu	Manukau	2	0	0	0	0
7	Jack McLeod	Richmond	1	0	0	0	0
7	J Gregory	Manukau	1	0	0	0	0
7	Joseph Hapi	City	1	0	0	0	0
7	Munro	Manukau	1	0	0	0	0
7	Taoho	South Auckland	1	0	0	0	0
7	Tukere	South Auckland	1	0	0	0	0
7	W R Walker	Manukau	1	0	0	0	0
7	Wilfred Brimble	Newton	1	0	0	0	0

=== Auckland Pakehā representative matches played and scoring ===
No	Name	Club Team	Play	Tries	Con	Pen	Points
1	Des Herring	Mount Albert	2	2	1	0	8
2	Roy Nurse	Ponsonby	2	2	0	0	6
3	Verdun Scott	North Shore	1	0	1	1	4
4	Arthur McInnarney	Mount Albert	1	1	0	0	3
4	Bob Banham	Mount Albert	1	1	0	0	3
4	Basil Cranch	Mount Albert	1	1	0	0	3
7	Claude Dempsey	Newton	1	0	1	0	2
7	Malcolm Cato	Mount Albert	1	0	0	1	2
9	Joseph Gunning	Mount Albert	2	0	0	0	0
9	Clarrie Peterson	Ponsonby	2	0	0	0	0
9	Richard Shadbolt	Mount Albert	2	0	0	0	0
9	Walter Cameron	Mount Albert	1	0	0	0	0
9	Huck Flanagan	Ponsonby	1	0	0	0	0
9	Angus Gault	Manukau	1	0	0	0	0
9	Roy Hardgrave	Mount Albert	1	0	0	0	0
9	Arthur Kay	Ponsonby	1	0	0	0	0
9	Bert Leatherbarrow	Mount Albert	1	0	0	0	0
9	Bill McKenzie	Newton	1	0	0	0	0
9	Ernie Pinches	Mount Albert	1	0	0	0	0
9	Brian Riley	Ponsonby	1	0	0	0	0
9	Jack Smith	North Shore	1	0	0	0	0
9	Ivor Stirling	North Shore	1	0	0	0	0
9	W Walker	Mount Albert	1	0	0	0	0
9	Frank Bell	Ponsonby	1	0	0	0	0

== Annual general meetings and club news ==
=== Auckland Rugby League Schools Committee ===
They held their annual meeting in mid May. President Mr. R.E. Newport congratulated the management on the progress they had made since the competition's inauguration with last year being a “record season”. Officers were elected as follows:- Patron, Dr. M.G. Pezaro; president, Mr. R.E. Newport; chairman of committee, Mr. A. Stanley; secretary, Mr. L Rout; selectors, senior, Mr. S. Dickey; intermediate, Mr. V. Rose. They deiced that where possible grades would be zoned with the season start date “tentatively fixed” for April 27.

=== Auckland Rugby League Junior Management Committee ===
The league decided to place on record their appreciation of the services of Mr. W.F. Clarke, the secretary. For the nine seats on the management committee, 13 nominations were received and the club ballot resulted:- D. Wilkie, I. Stonex, C. Howe, E. Chapmen, T. Carey, A. Hopkinson, M.E. McNamara, T. McIntosh and W. Berger, Messrs. Carey and McIntosh are new members. Mr. Wilkie was subsequently reappointed chairman. It was also decided to begin the junior championships on May 29. Mr. A Stanley resigned as chairman of the schools’ management committee in late May. Mr. V. Rose was appointed as deputy-chairman for the remainder of the season.

On July 4 the junior control board decided that all junior players should parade at Carlaw Park on July 22 to farewell the New Zealand team which was touring England and France. At their October 10 meeting it was decided “to confer with the clubs with a view to urging the amalgamation of the senior B and senior reserve grades.

=== Auckland Rugby League Referees Association ===
The annual meeting was held on March 7. Their report stated that she season had been very successful there being many new members. J. Donovan won the Carey Cup for being the most improved referee. Mr. Artie Rae was made a life member. The following officers were elected:-President, Mr Les Edgar Bull; vice-president, Mr G. McGowatt; executive, Messrs. R. Otto, Maurice Wetherill, J. Hawkes; delegates Messrs. William Mincham (Control Board), J. Short (junior management), G. Kelly (schools’ committee), and L.E. Bull (N.Z.R.L. Referees’ Association); official critic, Mr. A. Saunders; honorary secretary, Mr T.E. Skinner; treasurer, Mr A.E. Chapman; appointment board, Messrs. Artie Rae, and M. Renton; social committee, Messrs. A. Saunders, Maurice Wetherill and William Mincham; auditor, Mr Percy Rogers.

On March 27 Percy Rogers was made a life member of the Referees Association. He was an international referee and had been an active member for 16 years as well as being on the executive. At the same meeting the association accepted the resignations of Mr. W.H. Skelton who had accepted a coaching position, and Mr. H.T. Mcintosh who was now a member of the junior management. At the April 4 meeting Mr. William Mincham was made a life member following 25 years of “fine service”. William's son was Ted Mincham the New Zealand representative, and his grandson Robert Mincham would later represent New Zealand also. At the same meeting Mr. Freeman Thompson's resignation was “received with regret”. at their meeting on May 8 Frank Delgrosso, the former New Zealand international and long time Ponsonby player was elected by ballot as a member of the Referees’ Association. On October 1 the referees held their annual picnic at Mr. L. Pauling's farm at Te Atatū. Mr. An Ansell was presented with the Carey Cup for the most improved referee of the season.

=== Avondale League Football Club ===
In January the Avondale League Football Club wrote to the New Lynn Borough Council asking if they could use the New Lynn Domain ground for the 1939 season. The council decided that their request “would be given favourable consideration if the ground was suitable”. Avondale held their annual meeting on February 8 at the Labour Party's Rooms in Avondale. At the junior management committee meeting on May 9 they received a report from the Avondale club that they had acquired an area of ground on the Avondale racecourse. In mid June the Avondale club held a “successful fancy dress dance... in aid of funds for their candidate in the schoolboys’ queen competition”. Guests of honour included “members of the Auckland Rugby League ladies’ committee, Mesdames Culpan, Scott, Stonex, Howe, and Chernside, Mr. Ivan Culpan, and Mr. C. Howe”.

=== City Rovers Football Club ===
They held their annual meeting on February 27 at Carlaw Park and it was said to be “the most successful in the history of the club”. Mr George Hunt presided with their report emphasising “the fine play of the senior team which contested the final of the Roope Rooster competition”. C. Raynes was made a life member and Mr. Ernie Asher was congratulated on “reaching his 30th year with the club and 32nd year” involved with the sport. The following officers were elected:- Patron, Mr C. Raynes; president, Mr George Hunt; vice-presidents same as last year with power to add; secretary Mr Ernie Asher; treasurer Mr S. Belshaw; auditor Mr E.J. Phelan; club captain, J. Ragg. Hawea Mataira who had last played for City in 1937 was returning to the club after spending 1938 back on the East Coast. In mid March W.K. Greer, the Canterbury rugby representative joined the City side. He was reported “to be a good fullback, with a year's representative experience as a wing-three quarter”. On July 28 former City player Robert Clark died. He had played for City from 1916 to 1920 and represented Auckland in one match in 1919 which was against New Zealand on May 24. He scored a try in the match. Clark was survived by a wife.

On August 28 City held a combined dance with the Ponsonby club at the Metropole Cabaret. The colours used to decorate the venue were blue, black, and red. City held their annual picnic at Tui Glen, Henderson on October 29.

=== Ellerslie United League Football Club ===
They held their annual meeting on March 6 at the Parish Hall in Ellerslie with Mr. J. McInnarney presiding. Special mention was made of their senior B side which had won the knockout competition. Their fourth grade team had finished third while their seven-a-side team were runners up in the championship and knockout. Mr. McInnarney was elected a life member. Other officers elected were:- Patron, Mr. A.G. Osborne, M.P.; president, Mr. J. McInnarney; vice-presidents, Messrs. R.H. McIsaac, J. Court, C. Clarke, A. McKenzie, J. Carver, S. Whelan, B. Guy, Finerty, A. Crew, S. Woodhams, J. Pinches, M. Henderson, A. Chapmen; club captain, Mr. F. Chapman; auditors, Messrs. G. Skeen (chairman), R. Hunter, W. Miller, M. Campbell, H. Thomas, A. Strong, H. Johnson, R. Boss, S. Penberton, sen., S. Pemberton, jun., P. Simons, C. Murton, H. Arthur, J. Johnson, S. Harris, C. Spiro and A. Young.

On March 28 at the Ellerslie Borough Council meeting “objections to the curtailment of the number of playing days for the coming season were voiced by a deputation from the Ellerslie League Football Club. Members stated that for the past 14 years the club had been allocated alternate Saturdays during the season. The proposed allocation of one Saturday in three was considered unfair. The club had seven teams and over 100 players who were all local residents. The allocation of the ground for dog-racing was not in keeping with the national physical fitness campaign. The council decided to defer consideration pending replies from the other bodies concerned in the proposed allocation of the ground. In July former vice-president of Ellerslie, Mr. Albert Hutchison Mcintyre died. He was the current deputy Mayor of Ellerslie. On November 1 they held their 21st anniversary dance and prize-giving at St Mary's Hall in Ellerslie.

=== Glenora Rugby League Football Club ===
Glenora wrote to the junior management board on June 20 complaining about injuries received due to boot sprigs. The board advised them “that nothing could be done beyond action being taken in conjunction with the Referees’ Association”. While a delegate said that “he had noticed referees inspecting players’ boots recently on various grounds”.

=== Green Lane Rugby League Club ===
They reported to the junior management board at their May 9 meeting that Mr. F. Gadd had been appointed secretary for the club. Green Lane advised the league on July 5 that it had decided to invest a portion of its finances in the bonds issued to assist the tour of the New Zealand team. Chairman Campbell said “it was a fine gesture on behalf of the club”.

=== Manukau Rugby League Football Club ===
In January the Manukau club entered into negotiations with Ross McKinnon who was “the star of the last Australian team to tour England”. They held their annual meeting at the RSA Hall, Princes Street in Onehunga with Mr S.W. House presiding. Their annual report said it was creditable that the club has contributed five players to the New Zealand tour of Australia. The “placed on record appreciation for the services of their secretary Mr Allen Porter” over the past three years”. The club also noted that they had an urgent need to secure an adequate headquarters and training grounds with the committee authorised to “take steps to obtain them”. The following officers were elected:- President Mr S.W. House; secretary Mr L.G. Healey (vice Mr Allen Porter); treasurer, Mr A Walton; committee, Messrs C. Randrup, H. de Wolfe, J. Brown, and ex office members. They held another gathering on March 9 at the Training Grounds on Galway Street for intending players and supporters, to commence training and to elect a club captain. It was reported on April 28 that Waka McLeod of Tauranga had signed to play for Manukau. He was a Wanganui rugby representative in 1935 and would have played for Taranaki in 1936 but was injured. He then moved back to Tauranga and represented Bay of Plenty in 1937 and 1938. He was 23 years old and weighed 14.5 stone. In mid July it was announced that “a gold medal, donated by Mr. J.F. W. Dickson, for the most sportsmanlike conduct in senior football, was won by J. Hemi” with the presentation to be made at Carlaw Park on July 22 when the New Zealand touring team would be farewelled prior to leaving for England and France.

=== Marist Old Boys League Football Club ===
They held their annual meeting on March 2 in the ARL board room with Mr. Joe Sayegh presiding before a “large attendance”. The club was congratulated on it success and the various teams and coaches were referred to. Thanks were “extended to Mr. and Mrs. Glover, W. Cleary, E. McGinn, A. Baird, and S.M. Farrelly for generous practical support”. The following officers were elected:- Patron, his Lordship Bishop Liston; president, Mr. Joe Sayegh; vice-presidents, same as last year, with power to add; hon. secretary, Mr. Jack Kirwan; hon. treasurer, Mr. P Fletcher; club captain, R. Haslam; schoolboys’ delegate, Mr. E. Foster; auditors, Messrs. Hollyrake and B Cotterill; committee Messrs. J. Ball, P. Hughes, F. Webberley, George Copas and W. Maddigan.

=== Mount Albert United Rugby League Football Club ===
They held their 11th annual meeting at King George Hall in Mount Albert on February 20. Mr. A.C. Gallagher presided with patron, Mr. H.A. Anderson (Mayor of Mount Albert). ARL chairman Mr. G. Grey Campbell and secretary Ivan Culpan were present. The mayor said that the club “filled a long felt want in the district and he was proud to be identified with it”. The fifth grade team of 1938 was mentioned as it was the first junior team in the club to win a championship. J. Men, of the third grade team won the Mr. J.F.W. Dickson's medal for the most sportsmanlike player in the grade. I. Garrett was awarded the Patron's Cup for the best club schoolboy, C. Allen, of the reserve grade won the Vice-Patron's Cup as best club member, and the President's Trophy for best non-playing member went to A. Jenkinson, coach of the fourth grade and schoolboys. It was also noted that all of the forward pack gained representative honours, Joseph Gunning, Richard Shadbolt, and Bert Leatherbarrow for Auckland, M. Hansen and Jack Tristram for New Zealand Māori, and Des Herring and Clarry McNeil for New Zealand. C. Renton won H. Cotterall's trophy for most improved player. Trophies were given by Mr. Huxford for the best forward and for services rendered were presented to C. Callinan and Claude List, and Frederick List was awarded Mr. Roble's trophy for most consistent forward. Claude List also won the C. Elwin Memorial Cup for the annual 100 yards championship and Eric Cranch won the goal-kicking honours. The club also thanked their supporters the Mount Albert Borough Council and the St. John Ambulance Association. Nine new senior players were “signed at the end of the meeting where the following officers were elected:- Patron, Mr H.A. Anderson; vice-patron, Mr. Arthur Shapton Richards, M.P.; president, Mr. J.R. Johnson (Mr. Gallagher having retired from office), chairman of committee, Mr. R.J. Wilson; club captain, Mr. L. Pearson; honorary secretary, Mr. H.G. Shaw; assistant secretary, Mr. F. Martin; honorary treasurer, Mr. W.E. Schultz; honorary auditor, Mr. S.C. Johnston”. Prior to the start of the season Mount Albert secured the services of Australian Bob Banham who had played and coached in Auckland the previous season. In addition they also signed Bruce Donaldson, the Auckland rugby representative five eighth from the previous season, while R. Cameron was also accompanying Banham from Australia to play. Cameron reportedly weighed 13st 9lb and turned 23 on the day the Mariposa arrived in Auckland on April 3. He had previously played for South Sydney and the Queanbeyan country side.

At the referees meeting on June 12 a complaint was made about the state of Fowlds Park, and the senior delegate was “asked to draw the attention of the control board, with a request for representation of the matter to the Mount Albert Borough Council”

Arthur McInnarney who was selected for the New Zealand team to tour England and France in July received a presentation at his work (the Auckland Star on July 18. At a gathering in their social room at lunchtime Mr. E. Aldridge, “on behalf of employees of New Zealand Newspapers presented [him] with a complete outfit for evening wear, and in doing do said that his fellow workers felt proud of him, seeing that he was the first footballer of the staff ever to be chosen as an overseas representative”. Mr. W. Groves presented him with a dressing case “on behalf of the “Star” Social Club and endorsed the remarks of Mr. Aldridge”.

=== Newmarket Rugby League Club ===
The Newmarket club was revived at the start of the season at a general meeting held on February 6 and was granted affiliation as a junior club with the following officers elected: Patron, the Mayor, Mr. S. Donaldson; vice-patron, Mr. E.P. Liddell; president, Mr. E. Buchanan; chairman, Mr. R.E. Newport; honorary secretary, Mr. B.R. Arnott. Delegates: To the junior management, Mr. Moore; to the primary school's management, Mr. O’Connor; honorary treasurer, Mr. Skam; auditor, Mr. H. Wilson.

=== Newton Rangers Rugby League Football Club ===
They held their 29th annual meeting at the ARL boardroom on Courthouse Lane “before a large attendance” on February 27. The patron Mr M.J. Hooper “expressed his pleasure at the progress of the game and of the club which he founded just 30 years ago”. The seniors had finished third in the championship and they congratulated Bill McNeight and Wilfred Brimble on their selection to tour Australia. In addition H. Kendall, A. Duncan, J Proctor, A Nathan, and Steve Watene had also gained representative honours. The following officiers were elected:- Patron, Mr. M.J. Hooper, vice-Patron, Mr. W. Monteith; president, Hon. W.E. Parry; vice-presidents, same as last year, with power to add: trustees, Messrs. J. Rutledge and G. Steven; committee, Messrs J.A. Veitch, C. Preston, W. Dyer, D. McKenzie, J.A. Mason, and C Tunnycliffe; secretary treasurer, Mr J. Gibson, auditor Mr. C. Claudett.

=== North Shore Albions ===
Their annual meeting was held in the Labour Rooms, Devonport on March 1. On March 15 they sent a delegation headed by Mr. H.J. Gerrard to the control board meeting to suggest “the playing of more competition matches at Devonport. Chairman Campbell said that “due consideration would be given”.

=== Northcote and Birkenhead Ramblers League Football Club ===
Their annual meeting was held at the R.S.A. Rooms in Northcote on March 15. On March 28 at the Northcote Borough Council meeting they granted the use of Stafford Park for matches and practices for the season to the Northcote and Birkenhead club. Northcote and Birkenhead Ramblers held their annual ball on June 8 at the King's Theatre in Northcote. It had been organised by the ladies’ committee, comprising Mrs. T. Boyd, Mrs. C. Moore, Mrs. J. Dickson, Mrs. T. Schofield, Mrs. L. Reilly, Mrs. A. Borrows, Mrs. I. Bartulovich, and Miss N. Organ. Mr. Percy May was the master of ceremonies with the dance music played by an orchestra “under Mr. Geoffrey Crawford”. At the June 20 meeting of the junior control board a complaint was heard from the Northcote club regarding “petty thieving at the Outer Domain on June 10”. The board pointed out that it was a case for teams to supervise their possessions and that the league management could “not take responsibility”. On July 18 the club reported to the ARL that their treasurer, Mr. L. Riley, had resigned, and that Mr. C. Watson had been appointed in his place. On July 25 the Northcote club applied to hold a “charge day on Saturday at Stafford Park, Northcote”. The junior control board referred it to the control board “with favourable recommendation”.

=== Otahuhu Rovers Rugby League Football Club ===
They held their annual meeting in early March with Mr. C. Hall presiding. He stated that 1938 had been the “most successful since the formation of the club. It won the points Junior Trophy, was runner-up to Richmond in the Senior Points Trophy, won the senior B championship, and the fourth grade knock-out cup. The officers elected were:- Patron, Mr. H.T. Clements; president, Mr. Con Hall; secretary, Mr. Owen McManus; treasurer, Mr. C. Clark; committee, Messrs. W. Clayton, W. Gordon, C. Duane, C. Kelly, A. Porteous, J. Rond, W. Hart, W. McConnell and B. McDonnell. Club captain was J. Rond. O. McManus, assisted by W. McConnell were going to begin training a senior schoolboy team which was scheduled to play curtain-raiser to a touring Australian team at Easter. In late March the Otahuhu club sent a letter to the Otahuhu Borough Council asking for permission to use “Sturges Park for training purposes on the evenings or Tuesday and Thursday each week. On April 17 the Otahuhu Borough Council altered an agreement that the rugby league club could use Sturges Park for trainings on Tuesday and Thursday and instead gave the use of the ground to the rugby union club on those nights. They awarded rugby league the use of the grounds on Wednesdays. The Mayor said that the “council was not biased one way or the other. There are approximately 180 rugby players, against 90 to 100 belonging to the league”. They also decided to charge 12/6 per night instead of 7/6 as previously. On July 24 at their fortnightly meeting the Otahuhu Borough Council decided to “prepare a portion of the pound reserve for the purpose” of a practice ground for the Otahuhu club. The work would be done with No. 13 scheme labour.

In October, the club held its annual prize-giving event, which contemporary reports described as one of the club's most successful in several years. The evening was hosted by Walter Arnold and included the presentation of trophies won during the season. The senior B team won both its championship and knockout competition while the third-grade team achieved the same distinction in its division. Awards were presented to several team captains and players, including G. Brady, C. Kelly, E. Miles, J. Speedy, R. Philp, and J. Peterson. The third-grade team also presented gifts to Mr. and Mrs. C. Brady, while C. Kelly accepted the Nicholson Shield on behalf of the team as the club's most outstanding side. Mr. Roud received the Tracy Inglis Trophy from the Auckland Rugby League for the club's junior achievements. Club president C. Hall was presented with a case of pipes in recognition of his service to the club.

=== Papakura Rugby League Club ===
In late January the Papakura club wrote to the Papakura Borough Council thanking them for the use of the council's “coppers” at their recent picnic. They held their seventh annual meeting on February 28 at the Windsor Theatre in Papakura with “about 60 players” in attendance with president Mr. L. McVeigh presiding. Their report “disclosed a membership of 168, a record for the club” which included 131 playing members and 14 honorary members. The Papakura Amateur Athletic Club had presented a cup to the club to award to the boy who scored the greatest number of points and it was won by Des Bilkey. The club was aiming to field seven teams and their senior sides would begin training the following week. Negative comment was made regarding the reserve grade side with it stated “some members playing if and when, they felt inclined. Why should the club cater for any player who would let his team mates down’ selectors should know what to do with those who prefer racing to football”. Mention was also made of the trips taken during the season to Whangarei and Rotorua, while the third annual picnic had 500 people in attendance. The ladies social committee had organised many dances through the 1938 season and they were thanked. The club decided to make the subscription fee 7/6 for seniors and 5/- for juniors. Mr R Walsh had stated that only about 50 percent of the club had paid their fees the previous season. The annual report showed a credit balance of £118, though a heavy cost to the club was that of transport which amounted to £150. The total receipts were £294 and the club's assets were valued at £69. The following officers were elected:- Patron, Mr Hugh A. Pollock; president, Mr L. McVeigh; vice presidents, Messrs. W.H.D. Jack, S.N. Godden, W. Cornthwaite, S. Deery, M.J. Dobbing, J. Foggarty, sen., W. Human, E. Kemp, P. Hammond, F.J. Verner, C.H. Chamberlain, G.H. Davis, J. McVeigh, J. Wishart, S.D. Rice, S. Evans, C.W. Jackson, L. Fountain, F. Haynes; secretary to be appointed; treasurer, Mr R. Walsh; club captain, Mr. F. Osborne; committee, Messrs. B. Williams, W. Galloway, G. Wilson, V. Ashby, E.C. Dillicar, S. Schartzfeger, W. Leighton, S.N. Godden, L. Lacassie. At the Papakura Borough Council's meeting in mid March the Papakura club applied for the use of Prince Edward Park for the season, starting on April 1 with training to commence “almost at once”. The rent for the use of the park for the season was set at £10.

In early June the Papakura Post Office held a farewell function for Mr. P. Herkt who was transferring to Wellington. Herky had been a Papakura forward for years. On July 23 Papakura held a “special social function” with about 80 members and supporters in attendance to farewell Harold Milliken who had been chosen for the New Zealand team to tour England and France. Milliken was the Papakura club's first ever player to be selected to represent New Zealand. He was presented with “a substantial cheque... by the president, Mr. Les McVeagh, who wished him bon voyage and a successful tour. A combination travelling set was presented on behalf of the senior and senior reserve teams by Mr. J. Fogarty, captain of the senior side. Milliken “who replied, was accorded rousing musical honours. Items were given by Messrs Gregor Johnson, T.C. Seaton, Cyril Morris and Dobbyn”. In late July the club sent a letter of complaint regarding the state of Prince Edward Park which was “mud and slush”. The club secretary Mr. R.C. Williams wrote that the “club was deeply concerned about the conditions of the playing area. There was practically no grass in some parts and the mud near the shed where the sheep shelter was three or four inches thick. The Mayor said that the exceptionally bad weather was in a large measure responsible, but any damage by the sheep would be counteracted by the good they would do later on. It was decided to put a load or two of metal round the pavilion and pass on the matter to the reserves committee with power to act”.

In early September the Papakura Borough Council received a letter of complaint about the state of Prince Edward Park from the rugby league club particularly focussing on the playing area where the drain was not dealing with the flooding from recent rains. They also complained about several of the electric lights being broken and that the shed was in “an untidy condition” and often unlocked. On October 25 it was reported in the Franklin Times that the league club had taken over the scouts hall for training purposes. It would be fitted as a gymnasium and have “some useful equipment including overhanging rings, wrestling ring, vaulting horse, etc”. The club had received advice from the Athletic Centre in Auckland, and “a qualified instructor will be in attendance at the start of training which will begin very shortly. The training will be open for all members from boys to seniors”.

=== Pt. Chevalier Rugby League Football Club ===
Point Chevalier held a special general meeting on December 5, 1938, which resulted in a change to the club name from "The Pt. Chevalier Social and Sports Club (Incorporated)" to "Pt. Chevalier Rugby League Football Club". Their annual meeting was held at Armstrong's Hall on March 6. At the farewell for the New Zealand rugby league team at Carlaw Park on July 22 the Point Chevalier club were awarded a special trophy. The trophy was judged by ballot and was awarded based on “dress, marching and field conduct”.

=== Ponsonby United Football Club ===
A special general meeting was held on January 23 at their club rooms on 85 Jervois Road to look at altering Rule 11 of their constitution. They held their annual meeting at Curran Street Hall with Mr. J. Arnell presiding. The annual report noted that “a pleasing feature was the increase in player and general membership”. Representative honours had been “won by Arthur Kay, C. Petersen, E. Morgan, Jack Campbell, and Brian Riley. Mr. L. Mortensen who had been officially connected with the club since 1910 was made a life member and he was presented with his life membership badge. The financial statement showed a profit of £50 for the season's working. Their dance and social committee's activities had raised £40. The assets were shown at £221 and liabilities “nil”. Officers were elected as follows:- Patron Mr W.E. Grant; president, Mr J. Arneil; vice presidents same as last year with power to add; committee, Messrs. R. Francis (chairman), D. Malavey, R. Carlaw, D. Campbell, and B. Brown; secretary Mr. W. Grieves; treasurer Mr T.G. McKeown; club captain, Mr P. Rush; senior selector, Mr Gordon Campbell, auditor, Mr Graham.

On April 26 it was reported that Ponsonby was gaining the services of Frank Bell who had visited Auckland the previous season whilst playing for Eastern Suburbs on their tour. He was said to be able to play in any position and weighed 13st. 4lb. He had played at St. Joseph's College. On August 28 Ponsonby held a combined dance with the City Rovers club at the Metropole Cabaret. The colours used to decorate the venue were blue, black, and red.

=== R.V. Club ===
They held their annual meeting in the Y.M.C.A rooms on February 28, there was a good muster of players with a number of new members. A vote of thanks was made by the players and committee to Mr. E. Mullar, chairman and Mr. G. Dines, secretary for their service over the past two years with regret that they were resigning. Mrs. Dines received a presentation for her “valuable assistance” to the committee. The following officers were elected:- Patron, Mr. A.G. Harvey, chairman and president, Mr. W. Halverson, vice-presidents Messrs. W. Harvey, sen., A. Harvey, W. Harvey, jun., R. Harvey, D. Harvey, A. Harvey jun., F. Martin, W. Best, G. Martin, G. Taberner, C. Couper, W. Gussey, G. McGehan, R. Simpson, C. Hamilton, E. Griffiths, C. Smith, A. Cloke; secretary, R. McMilne, treasurer, W. Hamlen, committee, F. Derson, McLean, T. Adams, E. Knight, C. Lyons, T. Vercoe; club captain, E. Mullar; delegate, K. McMilne, coaches, W. Hanlen, L. Barchard, Heron.

=== Richmond Rovers Football Club ===
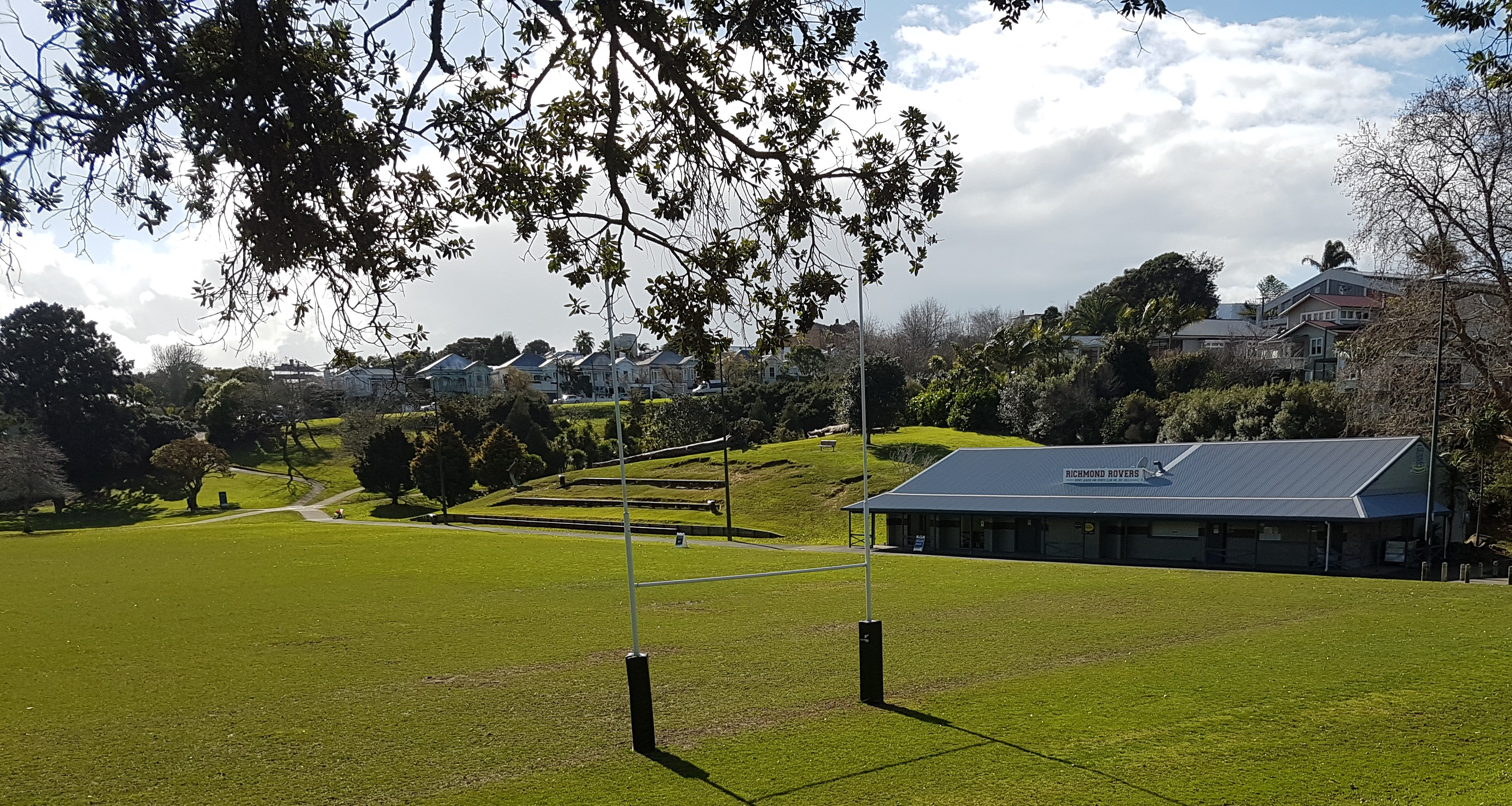
Richmond Rovers ground and location of club rooms.

They held their annual meeting on February 27 at their club rooms at Grey Lynn Park in late February. It was said to be “crowded” with Mr. Ben W. Davis presiding. The success of the club from 1938 was noted as they won the senior reserve championship, along with the third and seventh grades as well as the senior and intermediate school grades. They also won knockout competitions in the senior, senior reserve, third, sixth, and seventh grades and the senior and intermediate school competitions. Wally Tittleton, Jack Satherley, Harold Tetley, and Jack McLeod all toured Australia with the New Zealand team. The following officers were elected:- Patron, Mr. J. Redwood (sen); president, Mr. Ben W. Davis; vice-presidents, same as last year; committee chairman, Mr. W.A. Swift; secretary and treasurer, Mr. W.R. Dick; club captain, Mr. Ralph Jenkinson; school delegate Mr. E.J. McCarthy; auditor, Mr. J.A. Redwood. The club also welcomed “a number of new players”. They held their annual picnic at Henderson Domain on November 26.

== Senior grade registration and transfers ==
On March 1 there were two registration applications from Rotorua and J.E. Airey, the Canterbury representative hooker was registered with City Rovers. The Herald reported from the same meeting that Hawea Mataira, P.J. Johnson, J. Gould, W.J. Knox, H. Hulton, and N. Hulton were all registered with City. On March 22 Jack Turner formerly of Eastern Suburbs in Sydney was registered and joined Newton. Mortimer Stephens (playing with Rochdale previously) and Cyril Blacklaws also applied to play again for their old Newton club. Other players registered were T.E. Lawrence, W. White (Newton), R. Shilling, B.W. McDonald (City); R.G. Day (City); A.J. Sayers (Richmond); L. Cremer (Ponsonby). On March 28 the following applications for membership were approved: William K. Greer, H. Hulton, and N. Hulton (City), Harold Milliken (Papakura), J.B. (Bruce) Donaldson (Mount Albert), E. Montague, D. Ravell (Newton), D. Morgan, F.B. Schroder (North Shore), M. Puckey, J. Munro, J. Marsh (Manukau).

On April 5 the following players had their applications for playing membership approved:- C. Halford (Newton), T.A. Field (North Shore), S. Broadhead, K. Bjerk, L. McCready (Richmond); A. Smith (City), P. Awhitu, Cyril Wiberg, P. Kauhoa, George Nepia (Manukau), J. McManus, W. Goosman, H.W. Brown (Ponsonby); H.H. McKay (Papakura). On April 18 J. McManus was transferred from Otahuhu senior B to Ponsonby seniors. On April 19 the following applications for membership were approved:- H. Flannagan, P. Kelly, K.S. Kelcher, T.J. Chester (Ponsonby); Bob Banham, L. Clement (Mount Albert), J.W. Gillgren, K. Walker, J. Thompson (City); W.N. Sarsfield, M. Smythe (Newton); W.J. Reeves, Trevor Clifford Hosken (Papakura). While the following transfers were approved:- H. Zane (Manukau to North Shore); M. Pitt (Mount Albert to North Shore); V. Newcombe (Ponsonby to North Shore); F.C. Wells, (Ponsonby to Papakura); H. Collins (Mount Albert to Manukau). On April 26 for following registrations occurred:- J.E. Gallagher (Marist), W. Purves (Richmond), W.H. Smith (City). T. Yates transferred from Mount Albert to Ponsonby, while D. Williams transferred from Richmond to Ponsonby.

On May 3 T. Jones and D.N.R. Gemmell were registered with City, W. Paki (Pokeno), L. Wilson, and J Hapi with Manukau, and C Whiu with Mount Albert. The same evening D. Fraser appealed the refusal of Newton to grant him a transfer to North Shore. Newton claimed that they had a place in their reserve grade team for him and he was “first call for the top team forwards”. On May 9 B. Armitage transferred from Point Chevalier senior B to Northcote, G.S. Bodman and T. Kelley transferred from Papakura seniors to Green Lane senior B, while J. Couper was regraded from Ponsonby reserves to R.V. senior B, and S. Thomason from Mount Albert senior reserve to senior B. On May 10 the control board was advised by cablegram that Frank Bell's transfer had been cleared from New South Wales and he was registered with the Ponsonby club. The following memberships were approved:- S. Hapeta (North Shore), W.R. Walker (Manukau), P.J. McVerry, J. Logan (Marist), H.G. Freeman (Newton), K.B. Johnson (North Shore), and W. Goodwin (Ponsonby). On May 17 the following players were transferred: I. Ziegler (Newton to North Shore reserves), L. Bell (City seniors to senior B), J. Cortese (R.V. senior B to Manukau seniors). The following players were registered: W. Birch (Newton), Owen Cyril Wilkie (formerly of Richmond, with North Shore), S. Anderson (formerly of St. George in Sydney, with Newton subject to clearance from New South Wales). R.K. Andrews was reinstated to rugby league. Frank Bell from Eastern Suburbs was also officially cleared by New South Wales. B.L. Seagar was transferred from Newton reserves to North Shore, A.G. Osborne from Wellington to Ellerslie, B. Ormond and J Hapeta from Rotorua to Mount Albert and North Shore respectively. On May 24 the following players were transferred, J. Darwin (North Shore reserves to City reserves), H.W. Brown (Ponsonby reserves to North Shore reserves), G. Molesworth (Ngaruawahia seniors to Otahuhu senior B). The following regrades was approved:- J.J. Daley (City to Green Lane senior B). While Dave Solomon was registered with Richmond, as was E. Eastwood with Papakura. J. Little (Point Chevalier), and J.C. Harris (Otahuhu) were both reinstated. On May 31 the following players were granted transfers:- Graham M. Simpson (Ponsonby to City), B. Kelly (Ponsonby to North Shore), R.J. Smith was registered as a playing member of North Shore. Simpson was a Manawatu rugby union representative player.

On June 1 Jack O’Brien transferred from South Auckland to Auckland, while M. Pitman transferred from Northland to Auckland. On June 7 the following players were registered:- J. Herbert (Newton), A. McSweeney (City), Andrew Samuel Kronfeld (Richmond), and B. Kelly (North Shore). William K. Greer transferred from City to Papakura. On June 14 the following players were registered:- O.N. Sanderson (Mount Albert), R.G. Taylor (Marist), E. Clarke and E. Smith (City), and K Mills (Richmond). On 16 June W. Pitman transferred from Whangarei to City Rovers, and S. Thomassen transferred from Portland (Whangarei) to Mount Albert. On June 21 the following players had their applications for playing membership approved:- M. Housham and C. McDevitt (Newton); J.L. Sullivan (City); C.E. Dowling (Mount Albert); Fred Wolfe Moss, and James P. Moss (Marist). On June 28 W. Wharenui transferred to Papakura from Manukau, S. Anderson from Eastern Suburbs (NSW) to Newton. L. Bover registered with Newton, and R. Bond with City. Hutchinson was regraded from City seniors to their 3rd grade side.

On July 5 the following applications for senior membership were approved:- Robert Cheater (North Shore), J. Howe, O.C. Hudson (Marist), G. Brown, J Bourdot, H. Perry (North Shore). H.M. Emus were both reinstated. On July 12 George Edwin Raisbeck was registered with Point Chevalier, and I. McGregor (of Glenmore) with City. H.S. Skinner transferred from Newton to Point Chevalier and was regraded to senior B. On July 19 applications for playing membership were approved:- W.C. McKinnon (Mount Albert), and B.M. McKelvie (Marist). On July 26 Fredrick Leonard Schultz was transferred from Papakura to Mount Albert. At the same meeting W. Briggs and C. Saunders transferred from South Auckland to Auckland. J. Rose (Newton), and A.R. Hall (North Shore) applied for registration at the bracketed clubs. On August 2 G.R. Kerr transferred from North Shore to Papakura, and R. Broughton was registered with City On August 15 J. Hapi (City), and Steve Watene (Newton) transferred to Manukau. On August 23 the following players were registered:- J. Gregory (Manukau), A. Gray (Papakura), H. Roxburgh, and V.T. Rutherford (Ponsonby). Ted Mincham was transferred from Mount Albert to Richmond.

On September 6 A. Phillips transferred from Hikurangi to Auckland. He was registered with Otahuhu. A.J. Johnson was registered with the North Shore club.
