= 1940 Auckland Rugby League season =

The 1940 Auckland Rugby League season was its 32nd.

Richmond Rovers won the Fox Memorial Shield for the 4th time after previously winning in 1934, 1935, and 1937. They finished the season with a 12 win, 1 draw, 3 loss record and were 3 points ahead of runner up North Shore Albions, with Mount Albert United in 3rd. Papakura struggled through much of the competition only managing 1 win. They, like many teams had lost playing members to the war effort and were unable to field a reserve grade side.

Richmond Rovers also won the Roope Rooster knockout competition when they beat Ponsonby United 31–7 in the final. Richmond had made the final by defeating a surprise Papakura side who had beaten Otahuhu Rovers and Manukau on their way to the semi-final. While Ponsonby had thrashed Mount Albert 41–13 in their semi final. After being knocked out of the Roope Rooster, Manukau managed to win the Phelan Shield knockout competition when they defeated Mount Albert 20–14 in the final.

In the Stormont Shield, champion of champions match North Shore Albions beat Richmond 15–10. North Shore had qualified for the match by virtue of the fact that they had finished runner up in the championship. Typically the match would be played between the winner of the championship and the winner of the Roope Rooster. But with Richmond winning both trophies the long-standing rule was that the championship runner up would play in the match in that eventuality.

Richmond also won the reserve grade championship (Norton Cup) ahead of Mount Albert. There was very poor coverage of the reserve grade competition and as such a large number of results were not reported and towards the later part of the season match fixtures were not even being published in either The New Zealand Herald or the Auckland Star. The competition only featured seven of the eight 1st grade senior sides with Papakura not involved. Otahuhu Rovers won the Senior B championship (Sharman Cup) once again. This competition was also very poorly reported though most of Otahuhu's matches did at least have the score reported.

Owing to the war there were very few representative fixtures. The majority involved matches between Auckland (Tamaki) Māori and Pakehā sides with Auckland Māori playing one match at Davies Park in Huntly against South Auckland (Waikato). At the conclusion of the season a charity type fixture was played between the Auckland Veterans and the South Auckland veterans. Craddock Dufty kicked 5 conversions for the Auckland side in a 31–18 win.

Preceded by 1939	32nd Auckland Rugby League season 1940	Succeeded by 1941

== Auckland Rugby League News ==
=== Club teams by grade participation ===
There were 91 club teams across 11 grades (including the three schoolboy grades) in the 1940 season.

Team	Fox Memorial	Sen Res (Norton Cup)	Senior B (Sharman Cup)	3rd	4th	5th	6th	7th	Schoolboys	Total
Richmond Rovers	1	1	0	1	1	1	1	0	2	8
Newton Rangers	1	1	1	1	0	0	1	0	2	7
Point Chevalier	0	0	1	1	1	0	1	0	3	7
North Shore Albions	1	1	0	0	1	0	0	1	2	6
Otahuhu Rovers	0	0	1	1	1	1	1	1	0	6
Ellerslie United	0	0	1	0	1	1	0	1	2	6
Ponsonby United	1	0	0	1	0	1	0	0	3	6
Mount Albert United	1	1	0	1	0	1	0	0	1	5
City Rovers	1	1	0	0	1	1	1	0	0	5
Papakura	1	0	0	1	1	0	1	1	0	5
Marist Old Boys	1	1	0	1	0	0	0	0	2	5
Northcote & Birkenhead Ramblers	0	0	1	0	0	1	0	0	2	4
Newmarket	0	0	0	0	1	1	0	0	2	4
Green Lane	0	0	0	0	1	0	0	0	3	4
Glenora	0	0	0	1	1	0	0	0	2	4
Manukau	1	1	0	0	0	1	0	0	0	3
Avondale	0	0	0	1	1	0	0	0	1	3
R.V.	0	0	0	1	0	0	0	0	2	3
St Benedicts	0	0	0	0	0	0	0	0	1	1
Total	9	7	5	11	11	9	6	4	29	91

=== Agreement to commence season with war underway ===
On 14 February all “units of the Auckland Rugby League... adopted a resolution to carry on football as usual, with the proviso that, if it was necessary to curtail activities, the league would loyally support any government action in this direction”. The difficulties that the league would likely face were discussed at length and some pointed “to the request of Empire authorities that sport should be carried on as normally as possible, given the consensus of opinion being that, by providing the usual facilities for play, the game would be keeping men fit for national emergency”. It was also noted that as all clubs had already lost players to the war effort from the senior and lower grades. The possibility was also suggested of amalgamating clubs to maintain the strength of the competition. The annual report showed that £1537 16s 4d was transferred to the appropriation account. The balance-sheet showed that the assets of the league totaled £11,430 which was an increase of £100 on the previous year.

At its 30th annual meeting on 27 March tribute was paid to “the memory of the Rt. Hon. M.J. Savage” and they also “passed a motion of regret at the passing of two supporters, Mr. George Seagar, and international player in his day, and Mr. O. Blackwood”. The board added the name of Mr. W.J. Hammill to the honours board after a suggestion by Mr. E.G. Phelan. Phelan's name was also subsequently added. Officers were elected as follows: Patron, Mr. J.B. Donald; vice patron, Mr. J.F.W. Dickson; president, Mr. John A. Lee, M.P.; vice presidents, same as last year, with the name of Mr. B. Brigham president of Mount Albert, added: trustees, Messrs. A. Stormont, E.J. Phelan and G. Grey Campbell; junior board chairman, Mr. E. Chapman; club delegates to control board, Messrs. T. Davis, J.W. Probert, T.H.V. Wilson and a member to be appointed, auditor, Mr. R.A. Spinley, F.P.A. (NZ); hon. solicitor, Mr. H.M. Rogerson; junior board secretary, Mr. W.F. Clarke; delegate to Referees’ Appointment Board, Mr. A.C. Gallagher (T. Davis deputy); hon. physicians, Drs. M.G. Pezaro, S. Morris, K.H. Holdgate, J.N. Waddell, G.W. Lock, H. Burrell and W. Bridgman, hon. masseur, Mr. F. Flanagan. Then at the subsequent meeting of the board of control Messrs. Ivan Culpan and J.E. Knowling were reappointed hon. secretary and treasurer respectively, with Mr. R. Doble delegate to the New Zealand Rugby League and also press steward. Messrs. Percy Rogers, A.C. Gallagher and G. Grey Campbell were appointed to the Referees’ Appointment Board), and Messrs. T. Hill and E. Chapman (timekeepers). South Auckland (Waikato) had also applied to enter a team in the Auckland senior competition but the board “decided that owing to various difficulties revealed in consideration of the matter...it could not at present be approved”. It was intended to open the season with preliminary rounds of senior play on 6 and 13 April.

At their meeting on 3 April they welcomed new members onto the board, namely Jim Clark, who was a former New Zealand, Auckland, and Ponsonby player and long time official for the Otahuhu club, and Mr. F.M.V. Wilson, who was a former trustee and chairman at Newton Rangers.

=== Senior grade eligibility ===
The ARL senior board proposed to extend “during the duration of the war, the limit of three days to six in the case of juniors being tried out for senior teams before such players are regraded as seniors” however this was strongly opposed by the junior board. The “opinion was expressed that the change would be too detrimental to junior clubs and organisations”. The junior board members were unanimous “that the change would be too drastic, as well as unnecessary, because the quality of a trialist should be measured in three games”. At the 25 April meeting the difficulty that some clubs were experiencing in maintaining full playing strength due to players enlisting in the military forces was discussed. It was “decided that for the duration of the war the rule be waived regarding the nomination of senior reserve and senior B teams”. As teams had to field senior reserve grade teams to qualify to play in the senior grade chairman G Grey Campbell said “It is going to be difficult to keep the senior A teams up to full strength... and as time goes on reserve grade players will be moved up to fill vacancies. In the circumstances the requirements of senior status cannot be enforced”.

=== Scrum rules ===
After several weeks where scrums were an issue during matches it was decided to endeavour to improve them. Chairman Campbell “expressed approval of the suggestion by Mr. Jim Clark regarding the desirability of better understanding on the scrum formation. He said that there was need for improvement in the method of hooking to open up the game. It was decided to hold a conference next week with Messrs. Archie Ferguson, representing the New Zealand Referees’ Association, and Les Bull, chairman of the Auckland Referees’ Association, and Percy Rogers and A.C. Gallagher, of the appointments board”. It was decided that the ball needed to enter the scrum 3 feet and land before players could hook for the ball.

=== Resignation of Mr. D. Wilkie ===
On 28 February Mr. D. Wilkie submitted his resignation. He was chairman of the junior control board, and had been on the committee for seven years. He was moving to Ōpōtiki for business reasons.

=== Papakura army camp teams ===
At the board of control meeting on 3 April it was indicated that Papakura Camp teams would most likely be “officially represented in the Auckland Rugby League senior competition”. Captain T.P. Laffey who was the sports organiser of the camp was in attendance at the meeting and he pointed out “that football and other sports were an important integral part of soldier training and it was hoped that the board would admit one or two representative teams in the Auckland league senior competitions”. Chairman Campbell, with other members in agreement, “assured Captain Laffey that the league would welcome teams”. It was also decided that soldiers in uniform “for active service” would be admitted free to Carlaw Park during the season.

=== Carlaw Park military activities ===
The Auckland Rugby League gave permission for Carlaw Park to be used full time by the military for gatherings and training activities starting in September however they were still able to use it for rugby league activities on Saturdays until the end of the season.

=== Fred Tottey ===
Fred Tottey had moved to New Zealand from Australia and sought to play for Mount Albert. However he had still been under contract with his English club (Halifax) and was not allowed to register in New Zealand without a clearance being granted. As a result, he only played two preseason matches and then later registered with rugby, playing a few matches for the Grammar club before returning to Australia.

=== Weight increase for junior grades ===
On 23 April the junior control board granted permission “to raise the weights on all weighted grades by 4lb, the usual allowances to apply. The weighing committee reported that boys were finding difficulty in getting down to the present scale”.

=== Auckland representative team ===
At the 10 April board meeting “acting on the club nomination, a ballot resulted in the election of Messrs. H. (Hec) Brisbane, W. E. (Bill) Cloke, and A. J. (Dougie) McGregor as Auckland senior selectors for the season. McGregor was replacing Bert Avery who had been selector along with Brisbane and Cloke previously.

=== Obituary ===
==== James Rukutai ====
On 11 January Puhipi James Rukutai died suddenly at his daughters home in Onehunga. He was originally from Kawhia, and a member of the Ngāti Hikairo and Ngāti Hourua tribes. He was educated at St Stephens College. He worked as a miner at Waihi and while there played for the Goldfields rugby team. After moving “to Auckland he became established as a native interpreter, particularly in the Supreme Court, and was advisor in legal matters to a wide circle of his people”. He was “a vigorous supporter of league football, and was a member of one of the representative teams that visited Australia”. Rukutai played for City Rovers in 1910 and 1911 before transferring to the Manukau club for 2 seasons. He later moved back to his former City side from 1913 to 1918 before playing a final season with Māngere United in 1924. Rukutai made 9 appearances for New Zealand Māori in 1909, 18 for Auckland from 1911 to 1918, and 23 for New Zealand from 1911 to 1921. He also coached the 1921 New Zealand team on their tour and coached the New Zealand Māori side from 1922 to 1937. He was also involved in the Auckland Lawn Tennis Association and the Campbell Park Tennis Club. The minor premiership Rukutai Shield was named in his honour and is still competed for today. His funeral was held at the St. James’ Māori cemetery at Māngere. Tawauwau Tapihana and Tema Tewene spoke at his daughters house, paying “tribute to the memory of the departed Rangatira”. The graveside services were conducted by Revs. Tokorau Poihipi and E. Pepemana, and Mr. G. Harrison, Worshipful Master of Lodge Manukau, No. 24, of which Mr. Rukutai was a highly respected officer”. Noted rugby league officials in attendance included the president of New Zealand Rugby League, Mr. J.A. Redwood, and the chairman and deputy chairman of the Auckland Rugby League, Messrs, G. Grey Campbell and E.J. Phelan respectively. The Mayor of Onehunga, Mr. Archer Garside was also present. At a meeting for the Auckland Rugby League on 3 April Mr. H. Walmsley was thanked for “the offer of a special trophy to commemorate the late Mr. James Rukutai”. On 22 May the league read a written submission by a supporter, Mr. D. Philburn that the “Rukutai Trophy” be awarded to the senior team that is leading at the end of the first round in the championship. At the same meeting it was reported that Māori supporters, through Steve Watene “were contributing a sum towards a further special memorial to Mr. J. Rukutai”. With the ARL board subsidising the fund. On 10 July Mr. W.E. Dervan presented the league with a “presentation photograph” of Rukutai. North Shore were the inaugural winners of the Rukutai Shield when they finished the first round with 14 competition points from 7 wins and a loss ahead of Richmond and Manukau who both had 11 competition points. On 23 October a memorial tablet was unveiled in Rukutai's memory by Ted Phelan. The tablet was inscribed with the words “Ake Ake Kia Pono”.

==== William Winter ====
William Wilfred Winter died aged 55 on 6 June. He was a foundation member of Newton Rangers playing for them in 1909 and 1910. He “was a contractor by trade and was responsible for the early laying out of Carlaw Park when that site was a Chinamen's garden”. He was also on the Ponsonby United committee for several years in the mid-1920s.

== Senior first grade competitions ==
=== Preliminary rounds ===
==== Preliminary round 1 ====
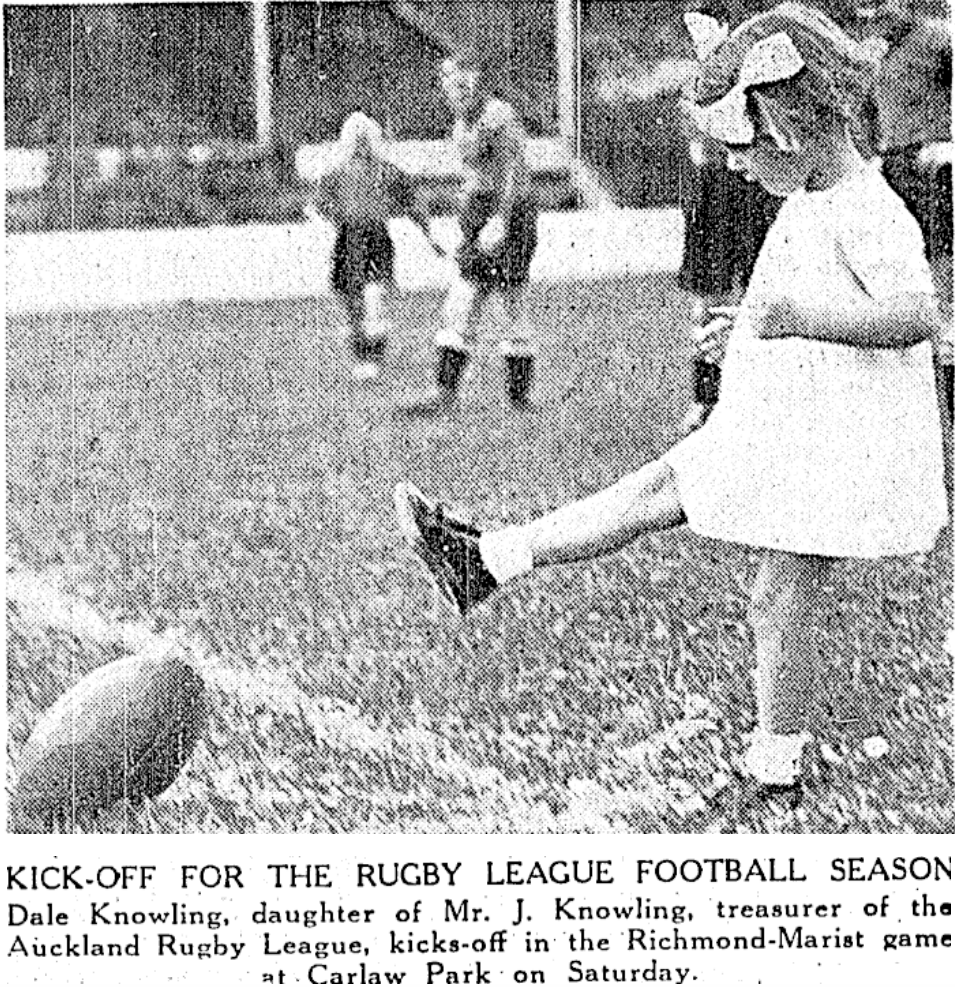
Dale Knowling, daughter of treasurer James Knowling kicking off the season.

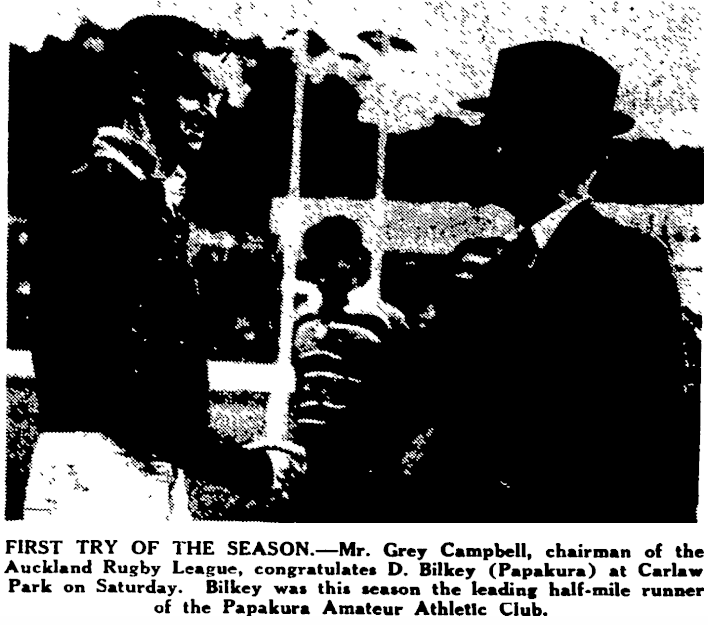
Desmond Bilkey of Papakura being congratulated on his try by chairman Campbell

Roy Mansill debuted for Mount Albert on the wing. He was the Auckland amateur sprint champion and the son of Arthur Mansill who played 41 games for Newton Rangers from 1918 to 1929 and three games for Auckland in 1926. Roy enlisted in the NZ air force as a pilot and was killed on a training flight at RNZAF Base Ohakea on August 3, 1945. He was educated at Auckland Grammar School. In the match between Richmond and Marist, Frank Furnell broke his left arm and was taken by ambulance to Auckland Hospital. His arm was set and he was later discharged. Desmond Bilkey of the Papakura side scored the first try of the season and after the match was congratulated by chairman Campbell. Bilkey had recently become the leading half mile runner at the Papakura Athletic Club which was also based at Prince Edward Park in Papakura as was the rugby league club. He enlisted shortly after this photo was taken and went to war. He was wounded in 1945 before returning to New Zealand. Fred Tottey played for Mount Albert. He had played rugby union in New Zealand as a junior and returned to his birth country, Australia and played 74 games for Eastern Suburbs from 1930 to 1937 scoring 77 tries and four games for New South Wales in 1937 scoring five tries. He signed for Halifax in the late 1930s until 1940 but returned to Australia and contract disputes meant that he was unable to obtain a release to play rugby league for any other clubs. He played the two preliminary round games for Mount Albert and then switched to rugby union joining the Grammar club, before returning to Australia during the year. He later moved back to New Zealand and died there in 1977.

6 April	Richmond	8–8	Marist	Carlaw Park 1
3:00	Try: Merv Devine, Laurie Mills; Con: Frank Furnell		Try: Gordon Midgley, Len Barchard; Con: John Anderson	Referee: H Tate

6 April	Manukau	16–13	City	Carlaw Park 1
1:30	Try: Dunster, W Tawhai, Pita Ririnui 2 Con: Tommy Chase 2		Try: A Smith 2, James Brassey; Con: A Smith 2	Referee: J Gedye

6 April	Mount Albert	23–9	Newton	Carlaw Park 2
3:00	Try: Arthur McInnarney, Roy Mansill, Flower 2, Bert Leatherbarrow; Con: Bob Banham 3, Robert Marshall		Try: Harry Richards; Con: S Anderson 3	Referee: E Pope

6 April	Ponsonby	10–8	Papakura	Carlaw Park 2
1:30	Try: George Funnell, Hector Dunning; Con: Wilfred Dormer; Pen: Boyd		Try: Desmond Bilkey, George Osborne; Con: J McInnes	Referee: A Pearson

==== Preliminary round 2 ====
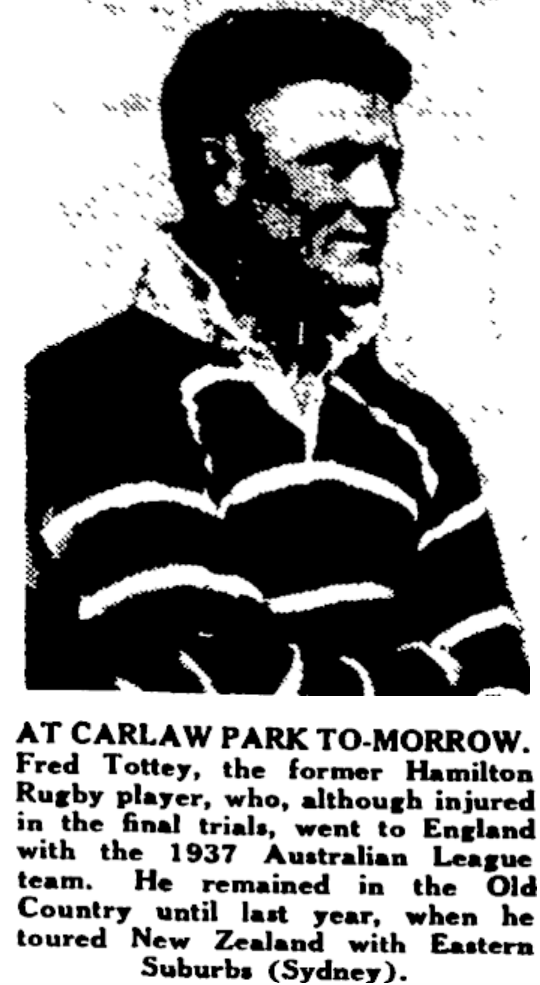
Fred Tottey

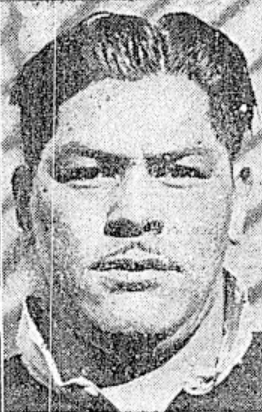
Pita Ririnui

Fred Tottey was said to have been the "outstanding player" in Mount Albert's 15–12 win over Manukau. At centre three-quarter his "speed off the mark, elusiveness and swift penetration was too much for the Manukau defence at times". For Manukau, Butler and Te Tai their new players from North Auckland again played well while Pita Ririnui was their best forward. For Papakura in their 23 loss to Marist, the pace was set by Harold Milliken in the forwards. He was well supported by J. Agnew and Buckeridge. While in the backs George Osborne at halfback, Ewan Cossey in the five eighths and J McInnes and L Wright in the three quarters were their pick though they mostly featured as individuals rather than was a unit. In contrast the Marist backs "at times worked sweetly in concert". Robert Grotte at halfback "was always alert... while [Jimmy] Chalmers was penetrative in the five eighths". For City A. Smith was their most impressive back in their easy 21–0 win against Ponsonby who were once again without Arthur Kay. James Brassey and Jim Gould looked impressive on the wings and Walter Findlater, Claude Kindley, and John Magee played well in their forwards. For Ponsonby Boyd at fullback, Funnell on the wing and Shilling at centre stood out, as did Roy Gee and Chester in the forwards. It was mentioned that North Shore would unlikely have the services of big New Zealand forward Ross Jones this year as his farm at Matakana was taking all his attention. They would however have Bruce Graham, "the big Wairarapa forward". In their backs they had stars in Verdun Scott and Jack Smith, while Robert Cheater and Bernard Evans on the wings were very fast. Evans had played in Sydney the previous season but had started his football at the Takapuna School. Bruce Donaldson also debuted for them after moving from Mount Albert where he had been a prolific point scorer the previous year. They had also acquired the fine loose forward, Clarrie Petersen from Ponsonby.

13 April	Mount Albert	15–12	Manukau	Carlaw Park 1
3:00	Try: Les Clement, Richard Shadbolt, Joseph Gunning; Con: Bob Banham 2 Pen: Bob Banham		Try: George Shilton, Jack Tawhai; Con: Tommy Chase; Pen: Tommy Chase 2	Referee: Jack Donovan

13 April	North Shore	9–2	Newton	Carlaw Park 1
1:30	Try: Clarrie Peterson; Con: Bruce Donaldson; Pen: Verdun Scott 2		Pen: S Anderson	Referee: J Cottingham

13 April	Marist	23–12	Papakura	Carlaw Park 2
3:00	Try: Don McLeod 2, Bill Breed, Kenneth Finlayson, Jimmy Matthews; Con: James Chalmers 3, Benny Crocker		Try: H Hogan, Harold Milliken; Con: J McInnes 2, J Agnew	Referee: E Longville

13 April	City	21–0	Ponsonby	Carlaw Park 2
1:30	Try: A Smith, Alan Donovan, Hawea Mataira, Jim Gould, Walter Findlater; Con: A Smith 2 Pen: A Smith			Referee: J O’Shannessey

=== Fox Memorial standings ===
Team	Pld	W	D	L	F	A	Pts
Richmond Rovers	16	12	1	3	303	145	25
North Shore Albions	16	11	0	5	263	161	22
Mount Albert United	16	10	0	6	285	206	20
Manukau	15	8	1	6	214	195	17
Marist Old Boys	16	8	0	8	206	206	16
Ponsonby United	15	7	0	8	164	183	14
Newton Rangers	16	6	0	10	194	211	12
City Rovers	15	6	0	9	123	190	12
Papakura	15	1	0	14	131	387	2

=== Fox Memorial results ===
==== Round 1 ====
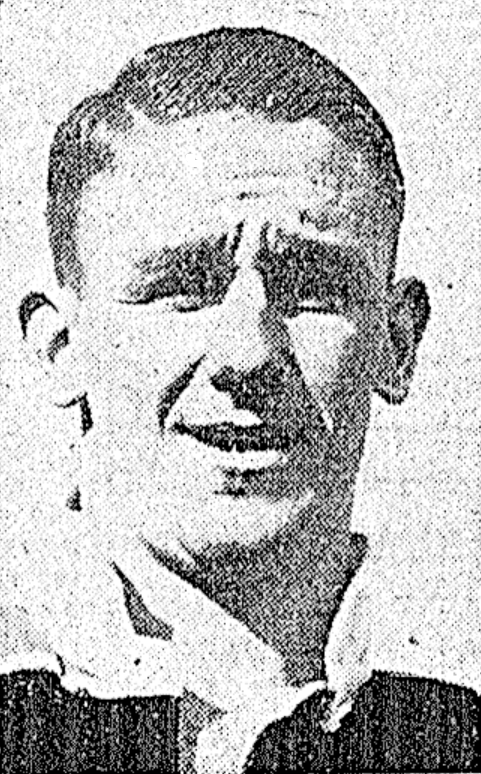
Verdun Scott, the North Shore fullback who represented New Zealand at rugby league and cricket.

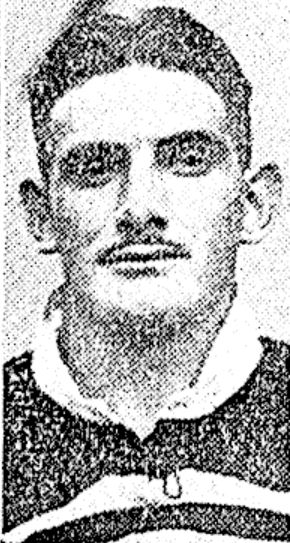
Jack Brodrick, usually in the second row for Manukau, played in the backline.

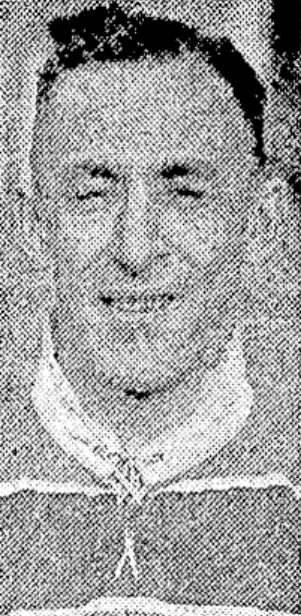
Warwick Clarke who debuted for City. He went on to be a prolific point scorer for City and New Zealand after debuting for them in 1946.

The North Shore v Mount Albert game was "hard fought all the way". Verdun Scott and Jack Smith "rose to every call made on them and were superlative in defence". Of the North Shore forwards Arthur Sowter and Condon were the pick. In attack the Shore side struggled to get the ball out wide but Robert Cheaters pace led to two tries. The Mount Albert forwards gave a "great display" with Richard Shadbolt and Joseph Gunning "ever prominent... [and giving] a great display". Les Clement was a "very fine attacking half". Colin Cowley was tried at fullback and "came through a hard day well but would probably be better placed in the three-quarter line". Manukau beat City 11-2 despite playing regular forwards Jack Brodrick and Pita Ririnui in the backline. Peter Mahima was their outstanding back scoring two "fine tries" and George Shilton and Freddie Maguire stood out in the forwards. Hawea Mataira was "certainly the outstanding one" in their forwards, while George Raisbeck gave his side brilliant service from halfback and "showed speed and initiative". At fullback Warwick Clarke, who would go on to represent New Zealand in 1946 gave an "exhibition at fullback that had the impress of real class". Phil Donovan and Robert Grotte were both missing from the Marist backline. Jimmy Chalmers "gave solid service to Marist" at halfback while Gerry Hughes and Dave McWilliams were "sound throughout" in the five eighths and Cliff Hudson "also impressed for an exhibition of good all round play at centre". Gordon Midgley went off injured in the first half and was replaced by McWilliams who went into five eighths with Ivor Uhlmann shifting to the wing where he played better after being "too flat footed" in the five eighths. In the full back position for Newton Claude Dempsey kicked too much. Papakura failed dismally in their opening championship game despite showing promise in their preliminary game. Of their team "the only players to make any impression at all were L. Wright and [Ewan] Cossey among the backs, and H. Milliken and Buckeridge in the forwards". In the totally dominant Richmond win over Papakura, forwards George Mitchell, Merv Devine, Hermes Hadley, and Maurice Metcalfe "were shining lights ... who raked the ball consistently for their backs". In the Richmond backs Abbie Graham and Dave Solomon "were outstanding, making fine openings for their supports and showing excellent appreciation of positional play". Laurie Mills on the wing "showed some of that dash which won him a place in the 1939 New Zealand team. Whilst on the other wing Trevor Bramley kicked 8 conversions, 2 penalties and scored a try for 23 points.

20 April	North Shore	16–10 (7-0)	Mount Albert	Carlaw Park 1
3:00	Try: Jack Smith, Robert Cheater; Con: Jack Smith; Pen: Jack Smith 4		Try: Bert Leatherbarrow, Jack Tristram; Con: Bob Banham; Pen: Bob Banham	Referee: Ken McIvor

20 April	Manukau	11–2	City	Carlaw Park 1
1:30	Try: Peter Mahima 2, Jack Brodrick; Con: Ralph Martin		Pen: Graham Simpson	Referee: Owen Chalmers

20 April	Newton	13–10	Marist	Carlaw Park 2
3:00	Try: Mortimer Stephens, Bill McKenzie, Jack Taylor; Con: S Anderson; Drop: Linley Sanders		Try: Dave McWilliams, Bill Breed; Pen: Jimmy Chalmers, John Anderson	Referee: Stuart Billman

20 April	Richmond	56–2	Papakura	Carlaw Park 2
1:30	Try: Dave Solomon 3, Laurie Mills 2, Maurice Metcalfe 2, Abbie Graham, Trevor Bramley, Merv Devine, George Mitchell, Hermes Hadley; Con: Trevor Bramley 8 Pen: Trevor Bramley 2		Pen: Ewan Cossey	Referee: Jack Hawkes

==== Round 2 ====
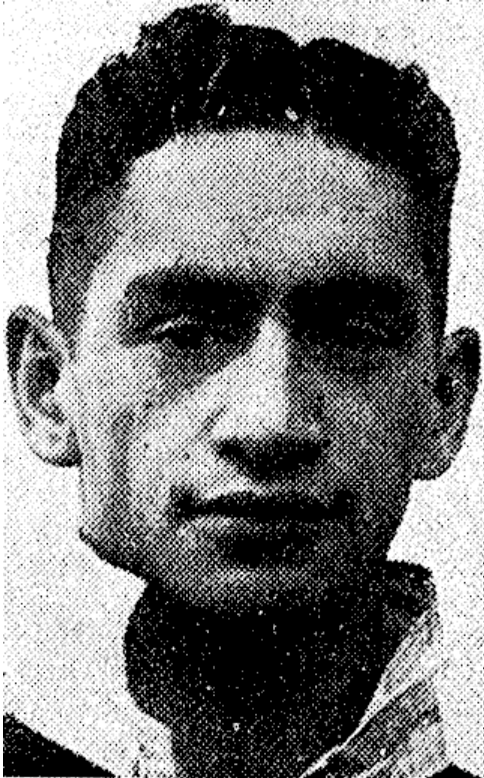
Jack Hemi who kicked four goals for Manukau.

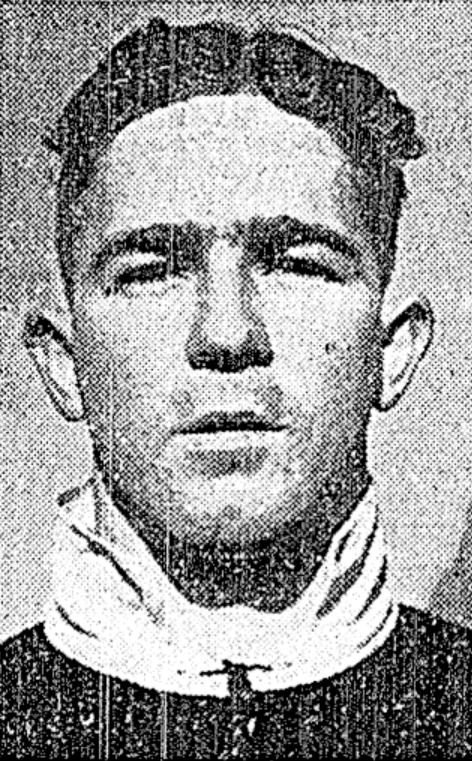
Arthur McInnarney, the Mount Albert winger who had been selected for the New Zealand tour of England the previous year in just his second season of senior rugby league.

Jack Hemi kicked four goals for Manukau in their comfortable 23-7 win over Mount Albert. He was playing his first game of the year and was said to have fielded the ball and tackled very well though mostly kicked rather than run his backs into position. W Tawhai at first five eighth and Ralph Martin who had transferred from Otahuhu at second five eighth were "shining lights" along with halfback Peter Mahima. While Tommy Chase at centre three quarter "again revealed himself as the best pivot in the game in Auckland". The losers had to play a lot of the second half with 12 player after fullback H Mclachlan went off injured. Mount Albert failed to get clean ball to their halfback Les Clement who in turn struggled to get good quality out to the backline. Bob Banham at first five eighth "was always looking for the opening that did not come" while Arthur McInnarney was dangerous on the rare occasion that the ball got out to him on the wing. Newton we said to have been "spurred on by a highly partisan crowd" to a 11–6 win over Richmond. Jack Taylor was brilliant for them in the forwards always up with the play with the Auckland Star saying he "was here there and everywhere". Veteran Claude Dempsey was safe at fullback and kicked for the line excellently and outplayed his opposite, Trevor Bramley. Wilfred Brimble "proved as nimble as ever behind the scrum and saw that his brother (Ted Brimble) at first five eighth had plenty of opportunities". Their back defence was excellent and they shut down a backline which included several New Zealand international players from the past, present, and future with Dave Solomon, Wally Tittleton, Laurie Mills, and Abbie Graham all "seen in a subdued light". Marist only trailed North Shore by one point at halftime but the North Shore backs showed "superior speed" in the second half to pull away. Bruce Donaldson, who had transferred from Mount Albert played well while J McArthur on debut was good behind the scrum. For Marist their centre Cliff Hudson and winger Ivor Uhlmann were their best backs while Phil Donovan also worked hard at halfback. Papakura bounced back from their thrashing the week before to beat Ponsonby 5–0 after a scoreless first half. It was however to be their only win of the championship. Hogan and Harold Milliken headed their forward pack with Buckeridge and Pratney also giving excellent support. J McInnes tackled well in their backs and Ray Halsey who had transferred from Marist scored a try and "showed initiative on attack". For Ponsonby, Des Williams and Wilfred Dormer had to do a lot of defending and Roy Nurse and John Bakalich "stood out prominently" in a backline still missing the services of Arthur Kay.

27 April	Manukau	23–7	Mount Albert	Carlaw Park 1
3:00	Try: W Tawhai 2, W Butler, Edward Te Tai, Freddie Maguire; Con: Jack Hemi 2 Pen: Jack Hemi 2		Try: Joseph Gunning; Con: Bob Banham; Pen: Bob Banham	Attendance: 3,000; Referee: George Kelly

27 April	Newton	11–6 (11-0)	Richmond	Carlaw Park 1
1:30	Try: Harry Richards 2, Joe Ginders; Con: S Anderson		Try: C Williams, Jack Greenwood	Attendance: 3,000; Referee: Stuart Billman

27 April	North Shore	20–12	Marist	Carlaw Park 2
3:00	Try: J McArthur, Bruce Graham, Bernard Evans, Eric Chatham; Con: Jack Smith 2 Pen: Jack Smith 2		Try: John Anderson, Bill Breed, Dave McWilliams, Cliff Hudson	Attendance: 3,000; Referee: Jack Donovan

27 April	Papakura	5–0 (0-0)	Ponsonby	Carlaw Park 2
1:30	Try: Ray Halsey; Con: J McInnes			Attendance: 3,000; Referee: J Gedye

==== Round 3 ====
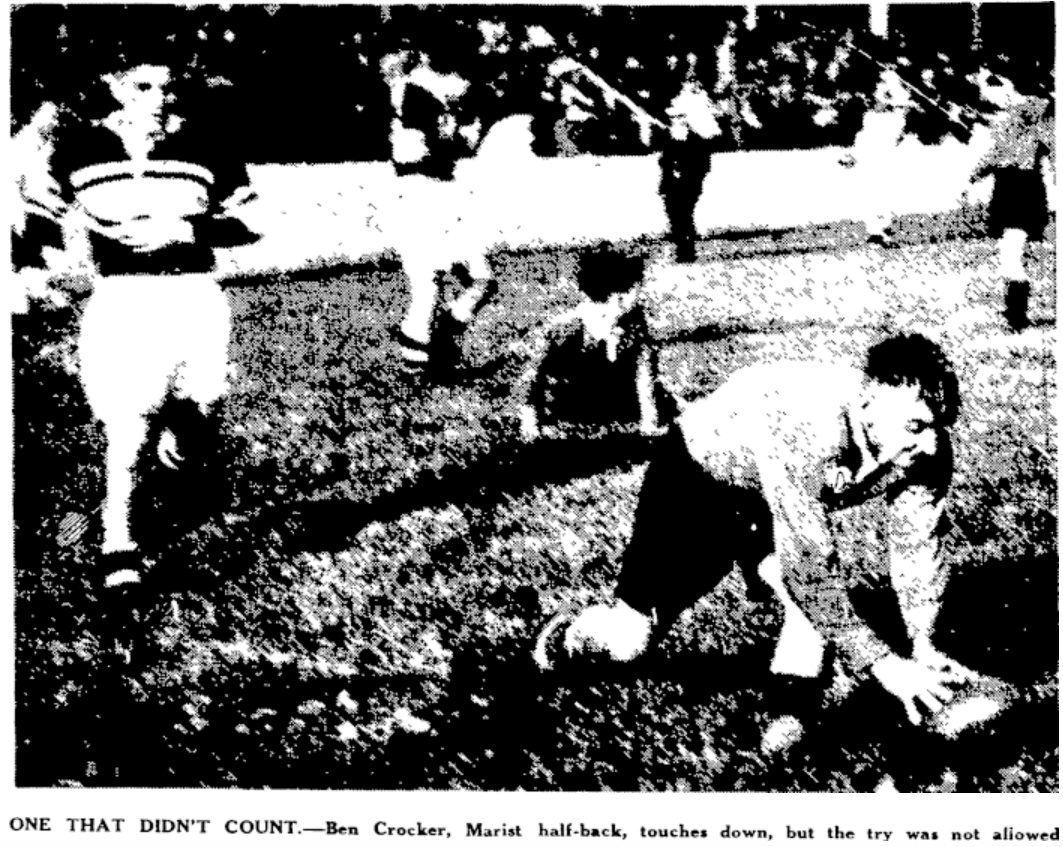
Benny Crocker, the Marist halfback crossing the Manukau line but the try was disallowed.

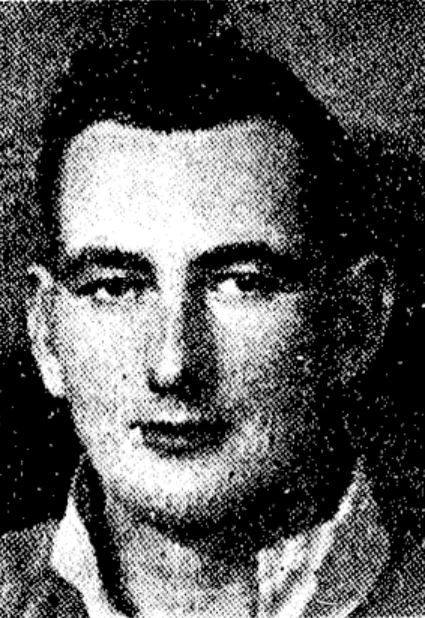
John Anderson the Marist loose forward who kicked six goals.

In the 3pm match on the number 1 field Richmond beat North Shore 15–12 before 4,000 spectators. Their outstanding player was Abbie Graham who "not only did he pave the way for several Richmond tries, but he rounded off a good day with a try himself". After halftime North Shore had to bring Jack Smith up from centre to "keep an eye on him". Since Dave Solomon joined the side Graham had been slightly overshadowed but he was the better of the two on Saturday and "he weaved a passage dexterously through the Shore defence on several occasions, was usually trailing in support when support was needed, and what was more, despite his slight build, invariably got his man". For North Shore Ted Scott returned to the side and "there was no better grafter on the ground". His cousin Verdun Scott also played a sound game at full back. For Marist a key contributor was their "diminutive right winger" Jimmy Matthews who "played a rattling good game" and scored a try. Well known boxer, Dave McWilliams also crossed for two tries for Marist in an impressive 30–17 win over Manukau after leading 20–5 at halftime. Ivor Uhlmann was sound at fullback, while Benny Crocker, Dave McWilliams, and Jimmy Chalmers were dangerous near the scrum. Crocker had returned to Marist after two seasons with Papakura. John Anderson kicked six goals for Marist. Newton gave Ponsonby their third defeat winning easily 20–0 to move to first in the standings. The "delightful five eighth" Ted Brimble was at the heart of the Newton attack. Donald McKenzie, Harry Richards, and Linley Sanders "reacted to his clever tactics" with the later two scoring three tries between them on the wings. Loose forward Jack Taylor stood out once again in their forwards "being in every movement" and he snapped up a ball in the greasy conditions to score a try which drew applause from the crowd. For Ponsonby their former Auckland representative hooker, Huck Flanagan made his first appearance of the season. City beat Mount Albert 13–6 to gain their first win after over turning a 2–6 halftime deficit. Future New Zealand representative Warwick Clarke "played a splendid game" at fullback for City. He had debuted in round one after transferring from Ellerslie at the start of the season. Bill Jackson impressed in the forwards for City and it was said that he should go close to representative honours. For Mount Albert their slightly built winger Colin Cowley scored a magnificent try. Roy Mansill on the left wing mishandled but Cowley sensing a chance raced across from midfield and took possession, beating James Brassey the opposite winger on the outside then beat an attempted high tackle by Warwick Clarke at fullback before scoring in the corner. City winger Jim Gould scored a try from halfway after capitalising on a mistake by Roy Mansill.

4 May	Richmond	15–12	North Shore	Carlaw Park 1
3:00	Try: George Mitchell, Abbie Graham, Wally Tittleton; Con: Trevor Bramley; Pen: Trevor Bramley 2		Try: Robert Cheater, Ted Scott; Pen: Jack Smith 3	Attendance: 4,000; Referee: Owen Chalmers

4 May	Marist	30–17 (20-5)	Manukau	Carlaw Park 1
1:30	Try: Jimmy Matthews 2, Dave McWilliams 2, Jimmy Chalmers, Len Barchard; Con: John Anderson 3 Pen: John Anderson 3		Try: Tommy Chase, Jack Brodrick, Joe Broughton; Con: Jack Hemi 3 Pen: Jack Hemi	Attendance: 4,000; Referee: H Tate

4 May	Newton	20–0	Ponsonby	Carlaw Park 2
3:00	Try: Linley Sanders 2, Jack Taylor, Harry Richards; Con: S Anderson 2, Claude Dempsey			Attendance: 4,000; Referee: Ken McIvor

4 May	City	13–6 (2-6)	Mount Albert	Carlaw Park 2
1:30	Try: Bill Jackson, Jim Gould, A Smith; Con: Warwick Clarke; Pen: W Mataira		Try: Bob Banham, Roy Mansill	Attendance: 4,000; Referee: Stuart Billman

==== Round 4 ====
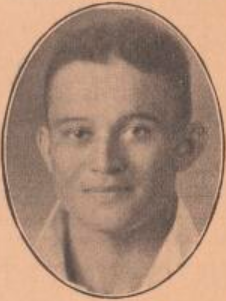
Wilfred Brimble a halfback through his career, played in the unaccustomed position of second five eighth for Newton outside his brother Ted Brimble.

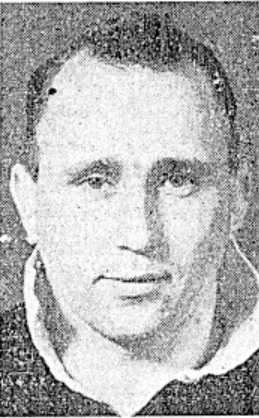
Harold Milliken was sent off for Papakura and suspended for two weeks. He was an All Black in 1938 before switching to rugby league and was selected for the 1939 tour of England.

Ponsonby scored their first points since their preliminary game on April 6. In the City v Marist game 28 year old Gordon (Benny) Crocker of Marist fractured his right forearm and was taken to hospital. It was said that he had been playing a fine game and his team sorely missed him having to play a man short. Crocker had played for Marist in 20 games in 1937 before transferring to Papakura early in 1938 where he played 25 games over two seasons. McWilliams was the best of the Marist wing three-quarters, while Jimmy Chalmers and Gerry Hughes played well in their five eighths. For City, George Raisbeck got the ball away from the scrum well while Jack Silva and Gerry Highes "were fine attacking five eighths". In their forward the Mataira brothers played well as did J.A. Thompson and Donovan. In the 4-4 drawn match between Richmond and Manukau, the later teams fullback Jack Hemi missed five shots at goal which was uncharacteristic for him. The final one was on full time and from near half way but went just wide. Overall Hemi was a "staunch" defencer, tackled and kicked to a high standard, and opened up play for his backs. Joe Broughton, Butler, and Tommy Chase "moved freely in possession" in the three quarters and defended well. Richmond's inside backs, Abbie Graham, and Dave Solomon "were the outstanding players among the Richmond backs", they "both ran straight and took a lot of stopping". Newton easily beat Papakura 28–6. For the first time in several seasons the halves did not feature Ted Brimble at first five eighth or Wilfred Brimble at halfback. Wilfred was moved out to second five eighth behind his brother Ted, with Oliver at halfback. Oliver "cleverly varied his play" while the Brimble brothers showed "fine co-operation" which meant McKenzie at centre "could reveal his best form". At fullback, Claude Dempsey in his eleventh year of first grade "fielded cleanly and made few mistakes". He was two days shy of his 31st birthday. Edgar Tredea, the slight winger had to come on and replace the unjured left winger, Jack Silva in the first half and he scored two tries. Midway through the second half in the match Harold Milliken of the Papakura side was ordered off. Papakura missed four penalty attempts at goal. He had been the "outstanding forward on the ground" prior to this. The ARL control board met in committee and decided to stand him down for two playing Saturdays. Edgar Tredrea scored 2 tries for Newton after being promoted to the senior side. He was the brother of Frank Tredrea, a champion cyclist who went on to represent New Zealand at the 1950 British Empire Games in Auckland. For Ponsonby in their 19–6 loss to Ponsonby Roy Nurse on the left wing "was always dangerous in possession, and showed up on several occasions for bright and penetrative runs". Huck Flanagan also hooked well for them but their backs were erratic with the ball. Arthur Kay made his first appearance of the season but his main contribution was said to be his three penalty goals. Kay had not really been a goal kicker in the first half of his career but kicked four goals in 1938, ten in 1939, before kicking 51 this season and leading the competition in point scoring. Despite their relatively easy win Jack Smith did not have a good game, running back into the forwards too often. Their best back was Bruce Donaldson who paved the way for both tries scored by Bernard Evans.

11 May	City	4–0	Marist	Carlaw Park 1
3:00	Pen: Warwick Clarke 2			Attendance: 6,000; Referee: Stuart Billman

11 May	Richmond	4–4	Manukau	Carlaw Park 1
1:30	Pen: Trevor Bramley 2		Pen: Jack Hemi 2	Attendance: 6,000; Referee: Ken McIvor

11 May	Newton	28–5	Papakura	Carlaw Park 2
3:00	Try: Edgar Tredrea 2, Bill McKenzie 2, Charles Everitt 2, S Anderson, Oliver; Con: Donald McKenzie 2		Try: Robert Buckeridge; Con: J McInnes	Attendance: 6,000; Referee: Jack Donovan

11 May	North Shore	19–6	Ponsonby	Carlaw Park 2
3:00	Try: Bernard Evans 2, Ted Scott; Con: Jack Smith 2 Pen: Jack Smith 2, Bruce Donaldson		Pen: Arthur Kay 3	Attendance: 6,000; Referee: Roy Otto

==== Round 5 ====
In the match between Mount Albert and Marist, Richard Shadbolt and McLeod were both ordered off near the end of the game. During the week they were severely cautioned by the control board. G.D. (Huck) Flanagan, the hooker for Ponsonby was sent off in their match with Manukau for lifting in the scrums. The referee had been heard by spectators warning Flanagan at the first scrum of the match for lifting, and he also discussed the issue with the Ponsonby captain, intimating “that Flanagan would have to be moved from the position of hooker”. A short time later he “was ordered by the referee to play second row of the pack, an action not considered warranted by members of the Ponsonby side”. He later moved to the prop position and whilst there the referee “decided to order him off”. After the match Flanagan was interviewed and “expressed astonishment at the referee's action. He stated that, during his 12 years’ experience in club and representative play, his style of hooking had never been questioned”. Other officials who were present refused to give comment on the incident until the referee had given his report to the control board. Flanagan was away on business during the week and so was told to appear before the board a week later. In the meantime the referee said that he had sent him off for repeatedly kicking the ball out of the scrum.

18 May	Richmond	19–8	City	Carlaw Park 1
3:00	Try: Trevor Bramley 2, L Williams, Wally Tittleton, Laurie Mills; Con: Trevor Bramley; Pen: Trevor Bramley		Try: Herbert Thompson, Jim Gould; Con: Warwick Clarke	Attendance: 4,000; Referee: George Kelly

18 May	Mount Albert	19–8	Marist	Carlaw Park 1
1:30	Try: Basil Cranch 2, Les Clement, Arthur McInnarney, Clarke; Con: Bob Banham 2		Try: Bill Breed, Kenneth Finlayson; Con: John Anderson	Attendance: 4,000; Referee: H Tate

18 May	Manukau	15–4	Ponsonby	Carlaw Park 2
3:00	Try: Peter Mahima 2, Jack Hemi; Con: Jack Hemi 2 Pen: Jack Hemi		Pen: Arthur Kay 2	Attendance: 4,000; Referee: Owen Chalmers

18 May	North Shore	37–8	Papakura	Carlaw Park 2
1:30	Try: J McArthur 2, Bruce Donaldson 2, Jack Smith, Bruce Graham, McIntosh; Con: Bruce Donaldson 3, Jack Smith 3 Pen: Jack Smith 2		Pen: J McInnes 4	Attendance: 4,000; Referee: J Gedye

==== Round 6 ====
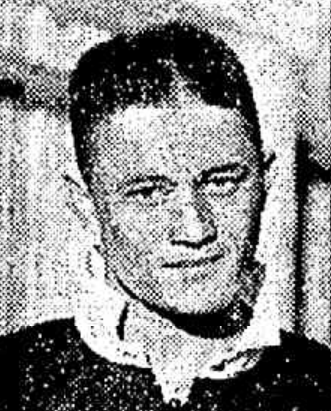
Walter Brimble debuted for Newton, joining his brothers Wilfred and Ted. He had played four seasons with Manukau rugby league following five seasons with the Manukau rugby union club.

The match between Newton and Mount Albert was played on 25 May as part of a Gala to raise money for the Sick and Wounded Soldiers’ Campaign. The gala featured the senior league match, midget league games, a representative football match, and a relay race between rugby league and football senior players. The rugby league relay team was Roy Nurse (Ponsonby), Robert Cheator (North Shore), Jack Brodrick (Manukau), and Jim Gould from the City club, with their un-required reserves being Linley Sanders (Newton), and Jimmy Matthews (Marist), while the football team was L Needham, G Hutchinson, A Masters, and G Robinson. The football side won the relay race after “the final runner for the rugby league team failed to accept the baton at a stage when a thrilling finish seemed likely”. The football match was drawn between Auckland and ‘The Rest’. Walter Brimble transferred from Manukau to join his brothers Ted Brimble and Wilfred Brimble. The three of them "combined splendidly". Remarkably when the sixth round was complete Ponsonby had still not registered a try through 5 matches (they had a bye in round 1).

25 May	Newton	8–6	Mount Albert	Carlaw Park 1
3:00	Pen: Claude Dempsey 4		Pen: Bob Banham 3	Attendance: 6,000; Referee: Jack Donovan

1 June	North Shore	15–6	City	Carlaw Park 1
3:00	Try: Bruce Donaldson 2, Bernard Evans; Con: Bruce Donaldson, Jack Smith; Pen: Bruce Donaldson		Pen: Jack Silva 3	Referee: K McIvor

1 June	Marist	18–15	Papakura	Carlaw Park 1
1:30	Try: Len Barchard, John Anderson, Jimmy Matthews, Phil Donovan; Con: John Anderson; Pen: John Anderson 2		Try: H Hogan 2, J Hutchinson; Con: J McInnes 2 Pen: J McInnes	Referee: Stuart Billman

1 June	Richmond	16–2	Ponsonby	Carlaw Park 2
1:30	Try: C.W. Williams, Laurie Mills, Edgar Takle, L Williams; Con: Edgar Takle 2		Pen: Arthur Kay	Referee: George Kelly

==== Round 7 ====
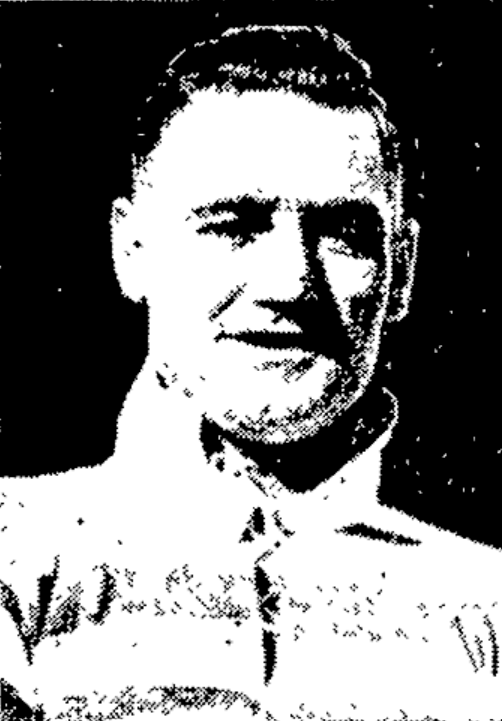
Claude Dempsey, gave a characteristically good fullback display for Newton.

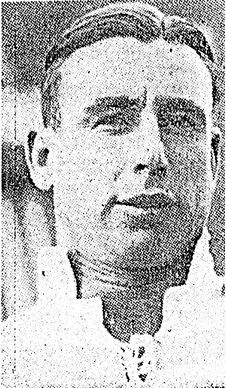
Bob Banham, the Mount Albert five eighths from Australia played well.

The matches at Carlaw Park were played before a large crowd of 7,000. In the main match North Shore beat Newton 12–8 with tries to forwards Condon and Bruce Graham. Newton was ably assisted by Claude Dempsey who invariably gave yet another outstanding performance at fullback. His "fielding was marked by unerring certainty, he kicked a good length, and moreover placed his kicks for the gaps". His opposite on the North Shore side was Verdun Scott who was "dependable" but his line kicking "could have been improved on". In the Shore forwards Graham and Ted Scott were the most prominent. Mount Albert completely outclassed Richmond in the first half and had the game won by the interval. The Richmond backs, despite featuring four current and future internationals were disorganised and "could do nothing right". While the Rovers forwards were beaten "in the loose by the rugged Mount Albert forwards". Despite this Merv Devine, the former Wellington rugby representative and All Black trialist played an excellent game for Richmond in their defeat. He was said to be one of the few forwards who had the ability to open up play for his backs. At 14 stone in weight and 6 foot in height he "has speed, good hands, and is one of the best loose forwards in the game". In the Mount Albert backs Bob Banham and Malcolm Cato played "splendid games" in the five eighths after getting very good service from Les Clement at halfback. Arthur McInnarney was good on the wing scoring two tries while Basil Cranch on the other wing also played well and scored a try. The best forward on the ground was Mount Albert's Joseph Gunning who was in his fifth senior season with them. Also for Mount Albert, 27-year-old, 13 st 8 lb prop Richard (Dick) Shadbolt stood out. He had switched to rugby league in 1935 after starting his football at Hamilton West School and was a Hamilton schoolboy representative. He moved to Auckland and played rugby union for Suburbs, Marathon, and Grafton. The Auckland Star wrote "he is one of the best forwards in the game, all for the reason that he does a full share in the set scrums and tight work, and does not try to shine at the expense of other branches of forward play in the loose". Ponsonby had their first win of the season. They had played five games and scored no tries but crossed for five tries in a 21–6 victory over City. Their Hooker, Huck Flanagan won the ball constantly from the scrums and Arthur Kay and Jack McManus "used their pace to beat the defence". McManus was making his first appearance of the season. Williams was good at halfback while Roy Nurse played a splendid game at centre and Murphy showed promise on the wing scoring their opening two tries two weeks after his debut. At Onehunga Papakura played "bravely" against Manukau and led at halftime but fell away badly in the second half. Steve Watene and J Marsh's constant aggressiveness wore out the lighter Papakura pack. It was reported during the following week that Frank Pickrang formerly of Ponsonby, and Peter Mahima of Manukau had been granted transfers to the Central club in Wellington as they were at the Trentham Military Camp preparing to go to World War 2. Pickrang returned and was later reported to have donated a magnificent photograph collection of the war to an institute in New Zealand, however Mahima was sadly killed in battle.

15 June	North Shore	12–8	Newton	Carlaw Park 1
3:00	Try: Condon, Bruce Graham; Con: Bernard Evans 2 Pen: Verdun Scott		Try: Linley Sanders 2 Pen: S Anderson	Attendance: 7,000; Referee: Stuart Billman

15 June	Mount Albert	24–11	Richmond	Carlaw Park 1
1:30	Try: Arthur McInnarney 2, Jack Tristram, Basil Cranch, Bert Leatherbarrow, Joseph Gunning; Con: Les Clement, Bob Banham; Drop: Malcolm Cato		Try: Wally Tittleton, Maurice Metcalfe, H Harrison; Con: Charles Webb	Attendance: 7,000; Referee: K McIvor

15 June	Ponsonby	21–6	City	Carlaw Park 2
3:00	Try: Murphy 2, Roy Nurse, John Bakalich, Hector Dunning; Con: Arthur Kay 3		Pen: W Mataira 2, Warwick Clarke	Attendance: 7,000; Referee: George Kelly

15 June	Manukau	25–16	Papakura	Waikaraka Park, Onehunga
3:00	Try: Freddie Maguire 2, Ralph Martin, Waka McLeod, Jack Brodrick; Con: Tommy Chase 4 Pen: Tommy Chase		Try: Ray Halsey, Trevor Hosken; Con: J McInnes 2 Pen: J McInnes 3	Referee: Jack Donovan

==== Round 8 ====
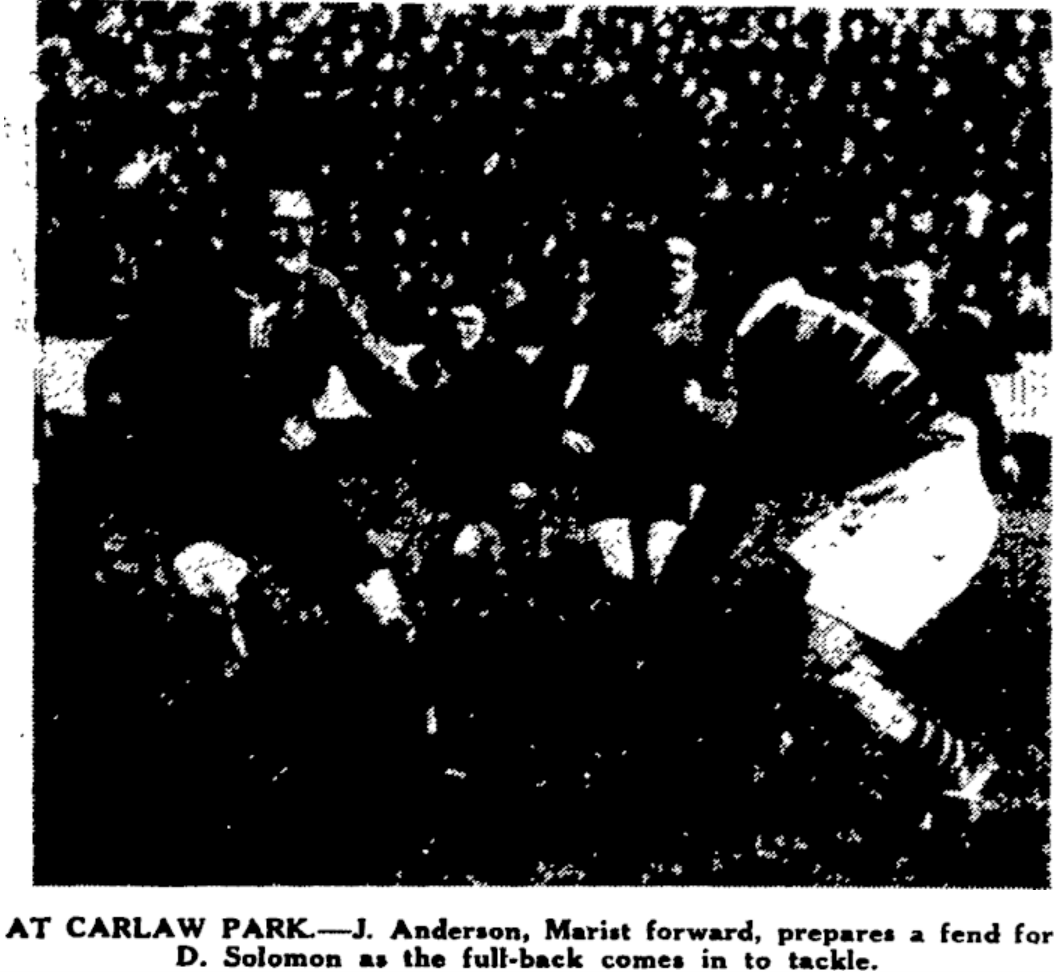
John Anderson about to fend Richmond fullback Dave Solomon.

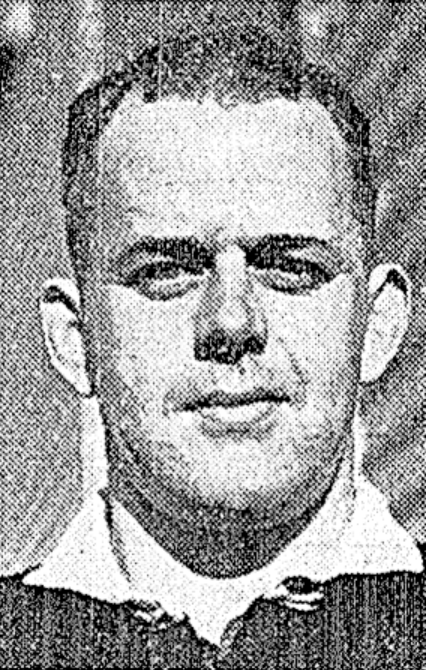
Bert Leatherbarrow (Mount Albert) who had a significant hooking duel with Huck Flanagan (Ponsonby) with both penalised several times.

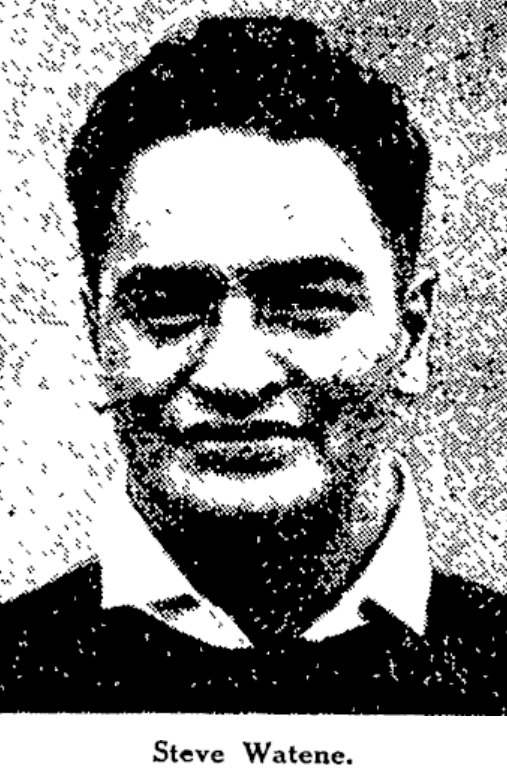
Puti Tipene Watene the big veteran Manukau forward.

For Manukau in their 14–8 win over the faltering Newton, the 17 stone 2 lb forward Steve Watene scored a try. He was well supported by J Marsh from the Hokianga and Pita Ririnui who the Springbok rugby team had said was the best forward they met on their 1937 tour. Both Marsh and Ririnui weighed "well over 16 stone". They were also blessed with 14 stone 7 lb Jack Brodrick, one of the outstanding loose forwards in the game for several seasons. In Marist's 20–10 loss to Richmond, James (Jimmy) Matthews on the wing showed his pace and scored one of their two tries. He was 21 years old and had begun playing football at Parnell School. He was born in Bootle, Liverpool on February 23, 1919, and migrated with his family to New Zealand in 1927. In his teens he joined the Akarana club before transferring to the Marist 5th grade team. Matthews debuted in the senior side in 1938 aged just 19 and weighed 10 st 5 lb. With Peter Mahima enlisting in the war effort the halfback spot was vacant and they filled it with Victor Selwyn. He had "attracted attention when a schoolboy at Pukekohe", and was this season playing for the Avondale fourth grade side where Manukau decided to recruit him to their senior squad. He only weighed 10 stone but "goes down to rushes in a fearless way, and his speed often saves him. He is only eighteen years of age". Mount Albert beat Ponsonby 27–19 with one of the interesting features the battle between hookers Bert Leatherbarrow and Huck Flanagan. It was thought that Flanagan shaded Leatherbarrow in the hooking department though Leatherbarrow scored two tries which were "well merited" and "topped off a sterling allround exhibition". The City win over Papakura was somewhat controversial as Jim Gould was running towards the Papakura line when Ray Halsey tripped him about 20 yards out. The referee Ken McIvor awarded an obstruction try (which at this time was awarded to the 'offended' player). The Auckland Star reported said that many of the spectators thought the incident was accidental though as the defence was "at sixes and sevens". The conversion by Jack Silva gave City an 11–10 lead which they held on to.

22 June	Manukau	14–8	Newton	Carlaw Park 1
3:00	Try: Steve Watene, W Butler, Wiremu Te Tai, Pita Ririnui; Pen: Jack Hemi		Try: Harry Richards 2 Con: S Anderson	Attendance: 5,000; Referee: Jack Donovan

22 June	Richmond	20–10	Marist	Carlaw Park 1
1:30	Try: Laurie Mills 2, Leo Davis, Maurice Potter; Con: Charles Webb 3 Pen: Charles Webb		Try: Dave McWilliams, Jimmy Matthews; Pen: John Anderson 2	Attendance: 5,000; Referee: George Kelly

22 June	Mount Albert	27–19	Ponsonby	Carlaw Park 2
3:00	Try: Colin Cowley 2, Bert Leatherbarrow 2, Malcolm Cato; Con: Bob Banham 4 Pen: Bob Banham; Drop: Malcolm Cato		Try: Hector Dunning, Allen Laird, Roy Nurse; Con: Arthur Kay 2 Pen: Arthur Kay 3	Attendance: 5,000; Referee: Stuart Billman

22 June	City	11–10	Papakura	Carlaw Park 2
1:30	Try: Jim Gould; Con: Jack Silva; Pen: Jack Silva 3		Try: H Hogan, Robert Buckeridge; Pen: J McInnes	Attendance: 5,000; Referee: Ken McIvor

==== Round 9 ====
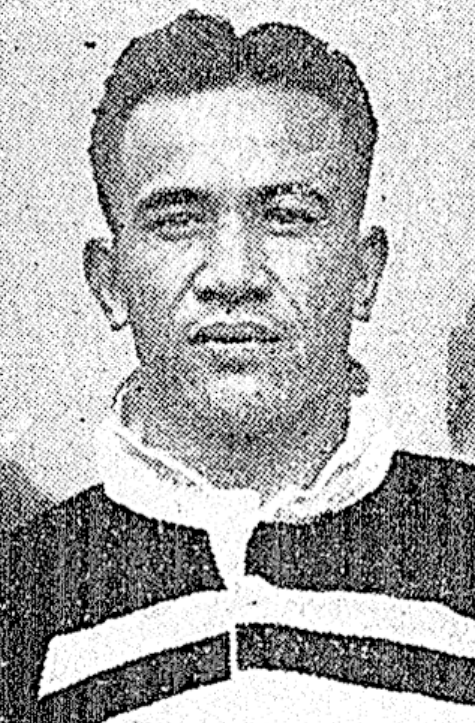
Tommy Chase the Manukau back with a famous left foot side step.

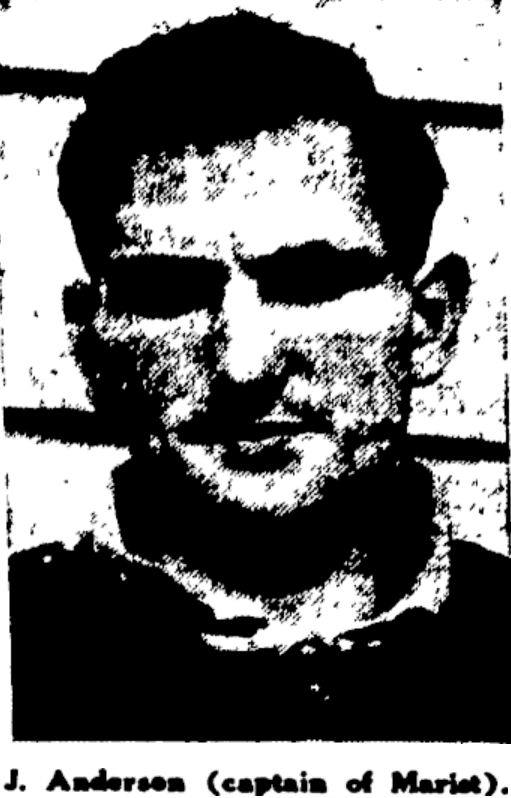
John Anderson

In a preview of the round the Auckland Star wrote about the North Shore - Manukau game saying "both teams will be strongly represented for the occasion. Manukau expect to field the heaviest pack in the code. In Watene, Ririnui, and Marsh they have three players over 16.0 in weight and in Rei and Brodrick two over 14.0." An enormous club crowd of 9,000 saw the three matches there with the 4th played at Ellerslie between Mount Albert and Papakura. J Marsh of Manukau was sent off during the match which was won by North Shore 12-7 but the referee did not submit a report and so the case lapsed enabling Marsh to play the following week. The Auckland Star said that Tommy Chase "the former Wanganui representative rugby player... has a lightning side-step from the left, which often baffles opponents, and is adept at cutting a way through to make an opening for his supports". In the backline with him who "has wonderful hands for football. He gathers passes clearly whether the ball comes high or low, and fields a high ball with dexterity. Tawhai, who formerly played for the City team, has capably filled the gap in the Manukau team by the transference of Walter Brimble to the Newton team where he is now associated with his brothers Edward (Ted) and Wilfred. Manukau threatened to come back into the game late but were accused of not focussing on the ball enough and too much on the man. Verdun Scott gave "a solid display at fullback" for North Shore but "he gave his team some anxious moments... by his slowness in fastening on to the ball when it was rolling dangerously near the North Shore line", though given his background as one of the best wicket keepers in New Zealand cricket his confidence was perhaps understandable. J McArthur was "a clever halfback", and Jack Smith "went brilliantly at first five eighths, while Eric Chatham was elusive at second five eighth "who several times carved gaps in the Manukau defence". Chatham was playing in place of Bruce Donaldson who had dislocated his elbow playing for Auckland Māori against Auckland Pākehā. The Chatham and Smith combination was said to have been better than anything they had seen so far in the season for North Shore. In their forwards veteran Ted Scott "stood out for a brilliant display". Marist led Ponsonby at halftime but then Ponsonby scored and took the lead which they held until midway through the second half. However Jimmy Matthews scored a fine try and then John Anderson used his speed to score and place the issue beyond doubt". City beat Newton 17–9 on the number 2 field with their forwards outstanding. Hawea Mataira and Bill Jackson "did effective work... and broke fast from the scrum and frequently held up the Newton inside backs". W Mataira and Wanklyn were also good. Warwick Clarke "got through a lot of useful work" for City at fullback. Good play by Arthur McInnarney on the wing was a feature of the match between Mount Albert and Papakura at the Ellerslie Domain. He had grown up in the area and played for the Ellerslie club as a junior with his father John on the committee there for many years. Basil Cranch "also played a good game" and Bob Banham did some excellent work both on attack and defence. In their forwards Richard Shadbolt and Flower played well, Flower especially "showing up well in the loose".

29 June	North Shore	12–7	Manukau	Carlaw Park 1
3:00	Try: J McArthur, Ted Scott; Con: Jack Smith; Pen: Jack Smith, Verdun Scott		Try: Jack Brodrick; Con: Tommy Chase; Pen: Tommy Chase	Attendance: 9,000; Referee: Owen Chalmers

29 June	Marist	18–9	Ponsonby	Carlaw Park 1
1:30	Try: Dave McWilliams, Jimmy Matthews, John Anderson; Con: Jimmy Matthews, John Anderson 2 Pen: John Anderson		Try: Hector Dunning; Con: Arthur Kay; Pen: Arthur Kay 2	Attendance: 9,000; Referee: Jack Hawkes

29 June	City	17–9	Newton	Carlaw Park 2
3:00	Try: Hawea Mataira, Rollo, Jim Gould; Con: Jack Silva; Pen: Jack Silva 2 Drop: Warwick Clarke		Try: Donald Fraser; Con: S Anderson; Pen: S Anderson 2	Attendance: 9,000; Referee: J Jones

29 June	Mount Albert	21–14	Papakura	Ellerslie Domain, Ellerslie
3:00	Try: Arthur McInnarney 2, Basil Cranch, Flower, Joseph Gunning; Con: Bob Banham 2 Pen: Bob Banham		Try: No scorers named	Referee: Stuart Billman

==== Round 10 ====
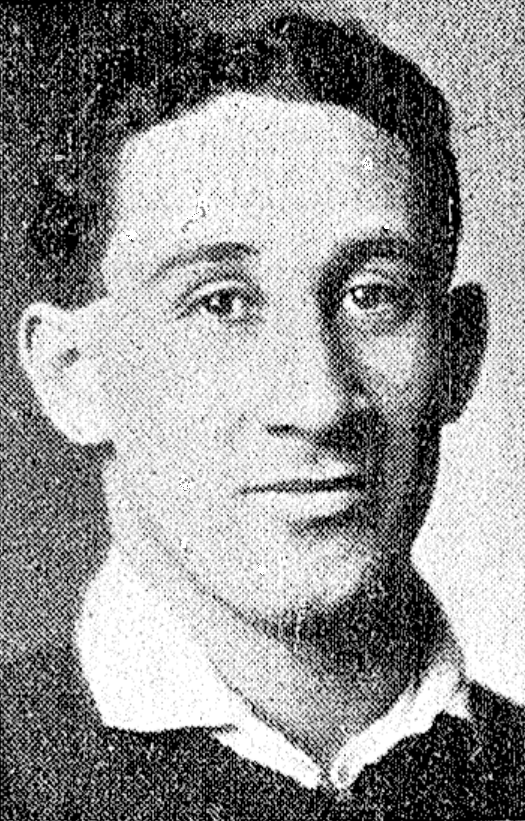
Dave Solomon (Richmond), one of the standout backs in all of New Zealand rugby league.

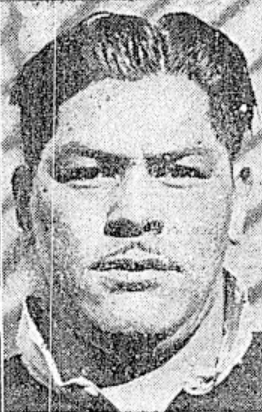
Pita Ririnui the giant 16 stone Manukau forward.

With Papakura trailing Richmond 32–2 with 14 minutes their captain Harold Milliken took his side from the number 2 field in protest at a refereeing decision by Owen Chalmers. The incident occurred just after the referee awarded a try to Richmond. After the match Milliken and the referee refused to make a statement but “several members of the Papakura team said that their action had been precipitated by the referee's decisions, with which they disagreed”. The control board met on 10 July to discuss the case and met in committee. It was reported later that the club had apologised for its teams actions and the apology was accepted by the board. For Richmond Dave Solomon at fullback "again proved that he is in a class by himself". He constantly made openings for Wally Tittleton and Laurie Mills. Mills was especially outstanding on the wing "showing a lot of speed and elusive running". Abbie Graham dropped a lot of ball at first five eighth though Charles Webb was clever at halfback. H Harrison played well in the forwards and scored a try though George Mitchell was the best forward on the ground standing out with his excellent handling and straight running. Although well beaten by Mount Albert, the North Shore forward pack never let up with Ted Scott and Clarrie Petersen standing out in the open in a "tireless six". For the winning side, Joseph Gunning gave "a fine exhibition of loose forward play... and his sharp and swift raiding brought constant trouble to the Shore defenders. Gunning is just on 14.0 in weight, has speed, handles well and is one of the greatest opportunists in the game". In the Mount Albert five eighths, Bob Banham played an excellent game and when they had a good lead he constantly drive back North Shore with "well placed stab kicks" which as well as giving his defence a rest opened up play for his forwards "who were keen to hunt in the open". Jack Smith and Eric Chatham in the North Shore five eighths tried everything they could to break the Mount Albert line but whether it was straight running or lateral running they could make no ground before having to pass to Jack Greenwood at centre. For Manukau in their comeback 18–12 win against City after they had trailed 12-0 early in the second half, the Auckland Star wrote "Pita Ririnui was prominent with crash methods playing for Manukau against City. He gave a virile display, deviated not one inch from the straight path, and gave tacklers the full benefit of his useful weight of 16.0. But good City low tackling toppled the massive Ririnui over. In the Manukau loose forwards Jack Brodrick "played a grand game". He "fields a ball like a first class slip in a cricket match, and he knows how to lengthen his stride to get over the ground". There were occasions when a timely pass might have served his side better". Hawea Mataira played an outstanding game for City. Newton fell to their fourth consecutive defeat after a great opening to the season where they won their first five games. Most of their losses had been relatively narrow with the latest being by four points to Marist (13–9). They were without Joseph Ginders, Proctor, and H Kendall though Maurice Quirke and Hadley came into the forwards. Edgar Tredea played at fullback in place of Claude Dempsey and "played with credit". Wilfred Brimble tried hard at halfback to try to avoid defeat and scored a try. His brothers were absent in the five eighths and Bill McKenzie and Linley Sanders struggled to fill their positions with both more accustomed to playing in the three quarters. Bill Glover was absent for Marist with Ivor Uhlmann filling his fullback position "and made a good job of it". While Uhlmann's place in the wing was taken by Dave McWilliams "who was sound".

6 July	Mount Albert	17–7	North Shore	Carlaw Park 1
3:00	Try: Jack Tristram, Bert Leatherbarrow, Les Clement; Con: Bob Banham 2 Pen: Bob Banham; Drop: H MacLachlan		Try: Jack Smith; Con: Jack Smith; Pen: Jack Smith	Attendance: 7,500; Referee: George Kelly

6 July	Manukau	18–12	City	Carlaw Park 1
1:30	Try: Tommy Chase, Victor Selwyn, Jack Brodrick, W Butler; Con: Tommy Chase 3		Try: Nesbitt, Alan Donovan, Jim Gould, Owen Hughes	Attendance: 7,500; Referee: Stuart Billman

6 July	Richmond	32–2	Papakura	Carlaw Park 2
3:00	Try: H Harrison 2, Laurie Mills 2, Hermes Hadley, John Crookall, Wally Tittleton, George Mitchell; Con: Dave Solomon 3, Charles Webb		Pen: J McInnes	Attendance: 7,500; Referee: Owen Chalmers

6 July	Marist	13–9	Newton	Carlaw Park 2
1:30	Try: Jimmy Matthews, Jimmy Chalmers, Cliff Hudson; Con: John Anderson; Pen: John Anderson		Try: Wilfred Brimble, Jack Silva, Charles Everitt	Attendance: 7,500; Referee: Ken McIvor

==== Round 11 ====
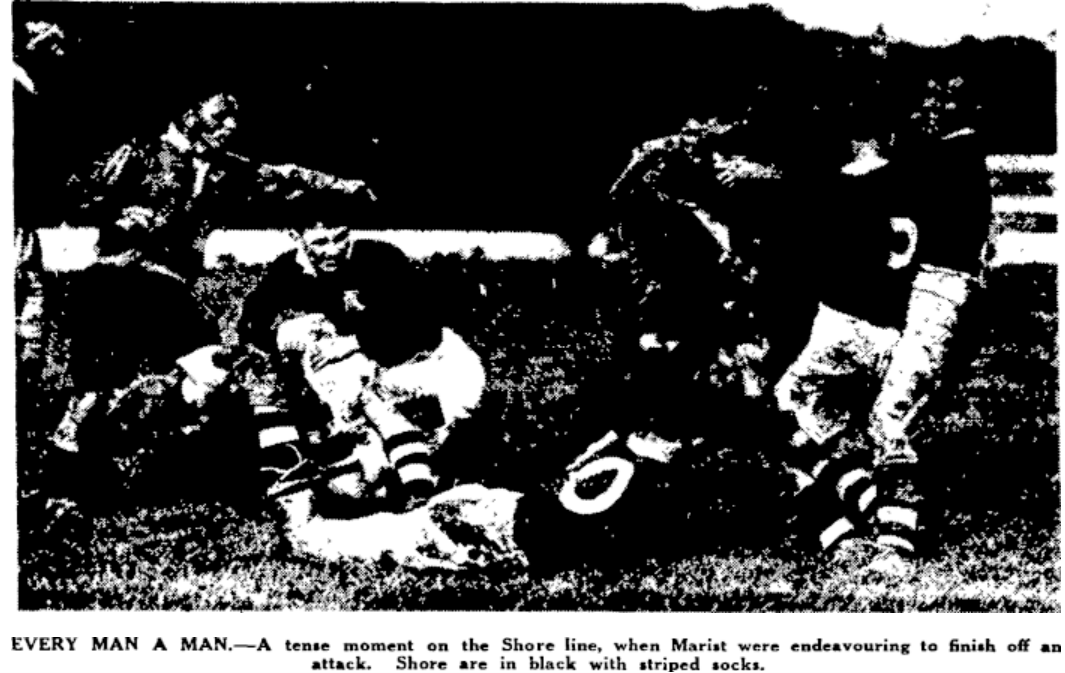

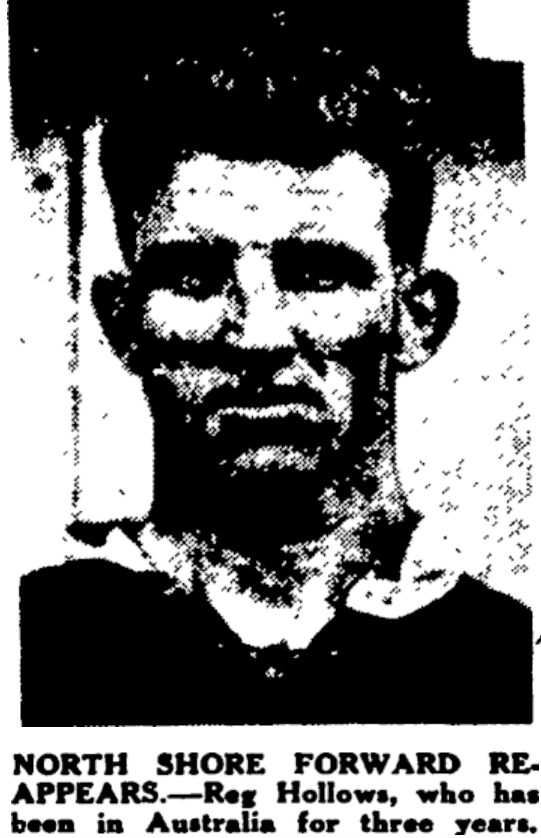

Ponsonby's win over Papakura was their 200th win in first grade matches stretching back to the inaugural season in 1910. They were the first team to achieve this feat. Reg Hollows made a reappearance for North Shore in their 7–5 win over Marist. He had played 26 games for them in 1936 and 1937, scoring 16 tries before moving to Australia where he played rugby league for Tweed Country. Verdun Scott was the hero for his side in their 7–5 win. With the scores tied 5-5 near the end of the match and North Shore "hammering" at the Marist try line the ball was cleared downfield to him close to the sideline. He "sighted carefully, kicked deliberately and to the undisguised joy of the Shore supporters the ball sailed high over the cross-bar between the posts".

13 July	Mount Albert	19–5	Manukau	Carlaw Park 1
3:00	Try: Colin Cowley, Malcolm Cato, Bert Leatherbarrow, Joseph Gunning, Des Herring; Con: Bob Banham 2		Try: Jack Brodrick; Pen: Tommy Chase	Attendance: 4,000; Referee: Ken McIvor

13 July	North Shore	7–5	Marist	Carlaw Park 1
1:30	Try: Ted Scott; Pen: Jack Smith; Drop: Verdun Scott		Try: John Anderson; Con: Jimmy Chalmers	Attendance: 4,000; Referee: George Kelly

13 July	Richmond	18–7	Newton	Carlaw Park 2
3:00	Try: Dave Solomon, Laurie Mills, Wally Tittleton, Andrew Kronfeld; Con: Dave Solomon 2, Charles Webb		Try: Proctor; Pen: S Anderson 2	Attendance: 4,000; Referee: Stuart Billman

13 July	Ponsonby	16–6	Papakura	Carlaw Park 2
1:30	Try: Hector Dunning, Arthur Kay, Roy Nurse, W Briggs; Con: Arthur Kay; Pen: Arthur Kay		Pen: J McInnes 3	Attendance: 4,000; Referee: Jack Donovan

==== Round 12 ====
In the match between Richmond and North Shore, 24 year old Charles Webb (Richmond) broke his jaw. He had played on after receiving the injury and was taken to hospital after the match. He had received “a severe blow to the face when endeavouring to tackle an opponent. He appeared slightly dazed for a few seconds, but continued playing throughout the game... at the conclusion of the match he collapsed in the dressing room and an examination revealed a badly fractured jaw”. Bruce Donaldson returned from his dislocated elbow injury received in the match between Auckland Pākehā and Auckland Māori to replace Verdun Scott in the North Shore side who had sprained his ankle after falling heavily in a midweek game of basketball at the Y.M.C.A. In Marist's 20–10 win against Manukau, their fullback Bill Glover was injured tackling one of the big Manukau forwards and had to leave the field. His place at fullback was taken by three quarter, Ivor Uhlmann. City had A. Smith hooking in their 24–7 loss to Mount Albert. He was usually a three quarter and this greatly disadvantaged the side as he was opposed by Bert Leatherbarrow the former New Zealand hooker. Newton led Ponsonby 9–5 at halftime and 14-5 halfway through the second half but Ponsonby scored two tries in the space of four minutes at the end of the game to snatch victory. Joseph (Jack) Ginders was an outstanding forward in the Newton pack. The Auckland Star wrote that he had "played league since 1922... he first played league for the Parnell School about 1922, and then for the Akarana fifth grade team which won the championship in 1927. He then joined the Athletic team and played third grade for about a year. A year or two later Ginders went to Dunedin, and joining up with the City team, proved one of its best forwards. He played with this team, the second best in the Otago competition for three seasons, and played in Auckland with the South Island team in 1934. He remained in Auckland and played with the Richmond senior forwards for half a season. For four years Ginders has held his place in the Newton side, which is sufficient proof that he is still a good all-round forward".

20 July	Richmond	18–13	North Shore	Carlaw Park 1
3:00	Try: Abbie Graham 2, Laurie Mills 2 Con: Charles Webb, Dave Solomon; Pen: Trevor Bramley		Try: Reg Hollows; Pen: Jack Smith 4 Drop: Bruce Donaldson	Attendance: 7,000; Referee: Jack Donovan

20 July	Marist	20–10	Manukau	Carlaw Park 1
1:30	Try: Dave McWilliams, Cliff Hudson, Jimmy Matthews, John Anderson; Con: John Anderson, Ivor Uhlmann; Pen: John Anderson, Jimmy Matthews		Try: George Shilton 2 Con: Tommy Chase; Pen: Tommy Chase	Attendance: 7,000; Referee: Stuart Billman

20 July	Mount Albert	24–7	City	Carlaw Park 2
3:00	Try: Des Herring 2, Bert Leatherbarrow, Les Clement, Arthur McInnarney, Joseph Gunning; Con: Bob Banham 2 Pen: Bob Banham		Try: Nesbitt; Pen: Jack Silva, Warwick Clarke	Attendance: 7,000; Referee: Owen Chalmers

20 July	Ponsonby	17–14 (5-9)	Newton	Carlaw Park 2
1:30	Try: Des Williams, Hughes, Huck Flanagan; Con: Arthur Kay 2 Pen: Arthur Kay 2		Try: Donald Fraser, Mortimer Stephens; Con: Claude Dempsey, Bill McKenzie; Pen: Claude Dempsey 2	Attendance: 7,000; Referee: J Jones

==== Round 13 ====
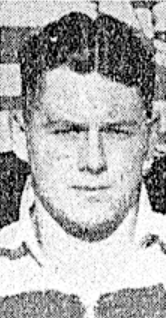
Arthur Kay the international five eighth for Ponsonby who played an outstanding game.

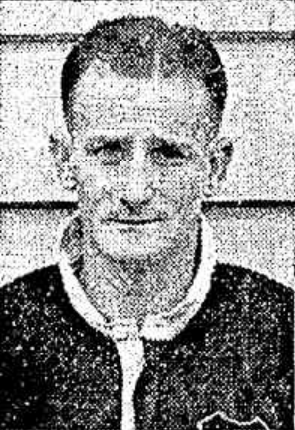
Jack Smith was moved back to his favoured fullback position for North Shore where he excelled.

Jack Hemi returned to the Manukau side after a few weeks absence for their 22–6 loss. He had received a kick to the leg earlier in the season and missed time sporadically and was not yet back to full fitness. As a result, he played in the five eighths rather than his usual position at fullback. In the Richmond backline Wally Tittleton at centre three quarter gave "an excptionally sound display", "and always improved the position in attack and revealed strong defensive powers. For sheer solid defence Tittleton has no superior in Auckland... [and] gave his best display of the season". Their whole backline functioned well with C Williams getting the ball away well to first five eighth Dave Solomon and Abbie Graham along with Tittleton "at the top of his form". The three of them were described as "devastating on attack". While Laurie Mills and H. Harrison were "speedy and dashing wings". Ponsonby beat North Shore 8–2 with Arthur Kay prominent in the backs where he opened up play for his outsides, with Roy Nurse and Jack McManus impressive. In the North Shore side they moved Jack Smith back to his more accustomed position of fullback where he gave a fine all-round display. On the 1938 tour of Australia he played at fullback, wing, centre, and even halfback in the final tour game against Sydney Firsts, and had been playing in the five eighths for North Shore recently. Verdun Scott was injured late in the first half and replaced by Owen Wilkie. In the City-Marist match the referee George Kelly received a kick and play had to be stopped for him to receive treatment. In the same match Reginald Haslam made a return to the Marist side after not having played for years and scored a try. He had been an Auckland rugby union representative who had played against England in 1930. Bill Glover was unable to play for Marist at fullback and Ivor Uhlmann taking his place. Cyril Wiberg played in the three quarters replacing Cliff Hudson and scoring a try and kicking a drop goal. Their best player was Jimmy Matthews in the backs, while for City, fullback Warwick Clarke gave "a fine exhibition", always being safe and "frequently set his backs in motion". Graham Simpson was "outstanding in the City three quarter line" while Thompson and Hawea Mataira "wre outstanding in the forwards". Thompson had to go off near the end and get treatment in the St Johns Ambulance Room after receiving a head knock during a hard forward "melee". Papakura was disorganised to start their game against Newton with a huge number of players out through illness including brothers Ray and Lionel Halsey, Ewan Cossey, John Fogarty, Dennis Evans, and J Hutchinson. A "sturdily built man [Francis], who has passed the active stage of football life, temporarily filled the [fullback] position" as J McInnes was not ready to take the field with the side starting with 12 players. After McInnes came on late in the first half to take his regular position and bring the team to 13 Francis moved into the forwards and 'always kept up with the game" and "was prominent" in loose rushes by their forwards. The player referred to was most likely Cliff Francis who had played fullback for Papakura in 1936 though it may have been his brother William who played in their forwards from 1936 to 1939.

27 July	Richmond	22–6	Manukau	Carlaw Park 1
3:00	Try: Laurie Mills 2, C Williams 2, Merv Devine, H Harrison; Con: Dave Solomon 2		Pen: Tommy Chase 2, Jack Hemi	Attendance: 5,000; Referee: Stuart Billman

27 July	Ponsonby	8–3	North Shore	Carlaw Park 1
1:30	Try: Roy Gee, Hughes; Con: Arthur Kay		Try: Bruce Donaldson	Attendance: 5,000; Referee: Roy Otto

27 July	Marist	10–5 (5-0)	City	Carlaw Park 2
3:00	Try: Cyril Wiberg, Reginald Haslam; Drop: Cyril Wiberg, Jimmy Matthews		Try: Graham Simpson; Con: Jack Silva	Attendance: 5,000; Referee: George Kelly

27 July	Newton	29–8	Papakura	Carlaw Park 2
1:30	Try: Mortimer Stephenson 3, Charles Everitt, Jack Taylor, Edgar Tredea, Ray Middleton; Con: Claude Dempsey 3 Pen: Claude Dempsey		Try: Harold Milliken, J McInnes; Con: J McInnes	Attendance: 5,000; Referee: Ken McIvor

==== Round 14 ====
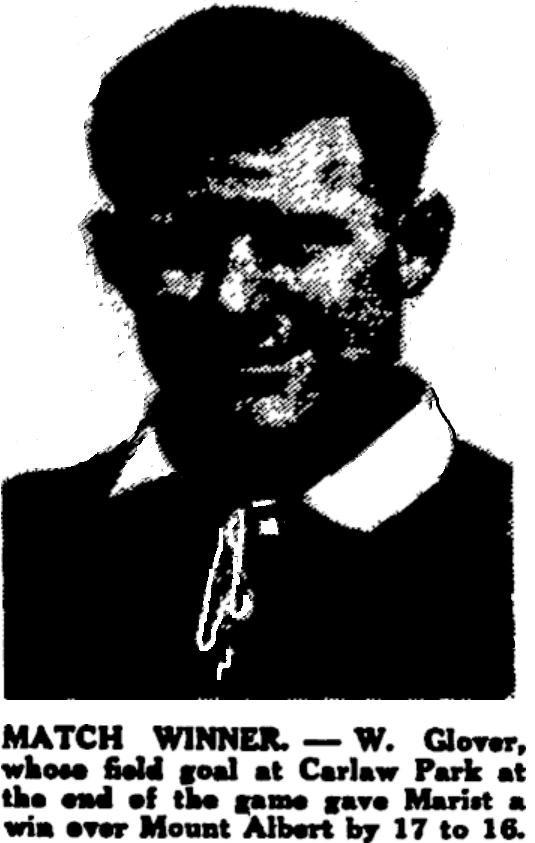
Marist veteran fullback William (Bill) Glover. He debuted for Marist in 1933 and had represented Auckland in 1937 and 1938.

Marist beat Mt Albert 17–16 in the final minutes after Bill Glover in the unusual position for him of five eighths "snapped a field goal". In general play Glover was described as a "brake" on their attack but Nicholson at halfback, and Jimmy Chalmers, Dave McWilliams, and Gordon Midgley "were spritely on attack and resolute on defence". At fullback for the winners Ivor Uhlmann "tackled splendidly", while Jimmy Matthews was the standout back being "quick to sense an opening" and showing speed and elusiveness. In the forwards their best was former New Zealand international, goal kicking loose forward John Anderson while he was well supported by Bill Breed, Don McLeod and Billy Grotte. Dobbyn hooked in the absence of Kenneth Finlayson and was "fully a match" for international hooker Bert Leatherbarrow in the Mount Albert side. For Mount Albert their five eighths Bob Banham and Malcolm Cato played well being "efficiently fed" by halfback Les Clement, while Colin Cowley frequently "cut through" in the centre position. In their forwards the outstanding player was Joseph Gunning who also scored twice. Rcihmond's five eighths Dave Solomon "had far too much class for their opposing backs" with Laurie Mills and Wally Tittleton the most impressive of the three quarters. In North Shore's 33–5 win over Papakura their fullback Jack Smith "played an outstanding game and started many effective movements". Eric Chatham was "splendid" in the five eighths, following Bruce Donaldson at first five eighth. North Shore had only scored two converted tries in the first half with Papakura hanging in the game but ran away with it in the second half. In the Papakura side H Hogan played well at halfback. "Splendid following up by [John] Fogarty was also a feature of the game" and Harold Milliken and Francis were also good in the forwards. Jack Hemi and Jack Brodrick were missing from the Manukau side but they still extended Ponsonby. Manukau led by five points at halftime but the superior play of the Ponsonby backs who finished well helped them to the win. Des Williams fed the backs well from halfback playing "easily his best game this season" while Roy Nurse "played a brilliant game" and scored twice after being well served by the hard straight running of Jack McManus at centre. Arthur Kay "played a fine game at five eighth" and kicked five goals. Manukau lacked combination but Tommy Chase was "the pivot of the attack". W Tawhai played well in the five eighths as did Butler and Ralph Martin in the three quarters. In their forwards Pita Ririnui "played a fine game". In the second half Steve Watene came out of the scrum to check the Ponsonby backs and tackled well.

3 August	Marist	17–16	Mount Albert	Carlaw Park 1
3:00	Try: Billy Grotte, Jimmy Chalmers, Jimmy Matthews; Con: John Anderson 2 Pen: John Anderson; Drop: Bill Glover		Try: Joseph Gunning 2, Arthur McInnarney, Bert Leatherbarrow; Pen: Bob Banham 2	Attendance: 4,000; Referee: George Kelly

3 August	Richmond	22–8	City	Carlaw Park 1
1:30	Try: George Mitchell 2, Abbie Graham 2, Leo Davis, Trevor Bramley; Con: Leo Davis, Merv Devine		Try: A Smith, J.A. Thompson; Pen: Jack Silva	Attendance: 4,000; Referee: J Jones

3 August	North Shore	33–5	Papakura	Carlaw Park 2
3:00	Try: G Brown, Clarrie Peterson, Bruce Donaldson, Ted Scott, Mcintosh, Eric Chatham, Jack Smith; Con: Bruce Donaldson 3, Jack Smith 3		Try: Penfold; Pen: J McInnes	Attendance: 4,000; Referee: Jack Donovan

3 August	Ponsonby	22–17	Manukau	Carlaw Park 2
1:30	Try: Des Williams 2, Roy Nurse 2 Con: Arthur Kay 3 Pen: Arthur Kay 2		Try: W Tawhai, George Shilton, Tommy Chase; Con: Tommy Chase 2 Pen: Tommy Chase 2	Attendance: 4,000; Referee: Ken McIvor

==== Round 15 ====
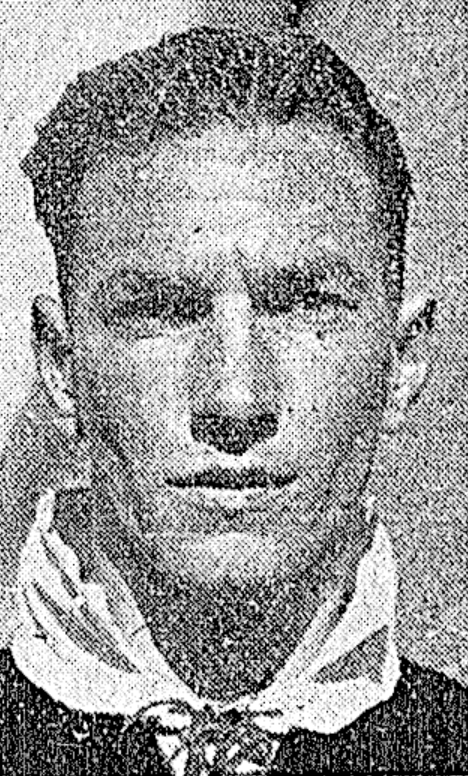
Laurie Mills

Laurie Mills played his last ever championship game for Richmond. Mills was a Richmond junior and he and Arthur McInnarney were the first ever Auckland Primary School representative players to go on to play for New Zealand. He progressed through the grades to debut for the senior side in 1938 and he played 49 games for them scoring 29 tries. The five foot eleven winger who weighed 74 kg also represented the North Island team in their inter-island match in 1939. Following the trial games he was chosen for the New Zealand tour of England which was unfortunately aborted due to the outbreak of World War 2. Mills had enlisted for the war effort earlier in the year and departed for North Africa soon after his final game. He was killed in Libya in 1941 on December 1 aged just 23. It was reported in the Auckland Star that Verdun Scott was returning from injury however they contradicted their earlier report that said he had received his injury playing basketball at the YMCA, and said that his injury had occurred playing table tennis. His cousin, Len Scott came out of retirement to assist the side for the match.

10 August	Richmond	10–6	Ponsonby	Carlaw Park 1
3:00	Try: Jack McLeod, Williams; Con: Dave Solomon; Pen: Dave Solomon		Pen: Arthur Kay 3	Attendance: 4,000; Referee: Jack Donovan

10 August	Mount Albert	13–2	Newton	Carlaw Park 1
1:30	Try: Les Clement, Malcolm Cato, Joseph Gunning; Con: Bob Banham 2		Pen: Claude Dempsey	Attendance: 4,000; Referee: Owen Chalmers

10 August	North Shore	17–8 (4-8)	City	Carlaw Park 2
3:00	Try: Ted Scott, Bruce Graham, McArthur; Con: Verdun Scott 2 Pen: Verdun Scott, Bruce Donaldson		Try: John Magee, Graham Simpson; Pen: Warwick Clarke	Attendance: 4,000; Referee: H Tate

10 August	Papakura	8–27	Marist	Prince Edward Park, Papakura
3:00	Try: Ray Halsey, Lionel Halsey; Pen: J McInnes		Try: Jimmy Matthews, Kenneth Finlayson, Dave McWilliams, Gerry Hughes, William Grotte; Con: Dave McWilliams, Ivor Uhlmann	Referee: Ken McIvor

==== Round 16 ====
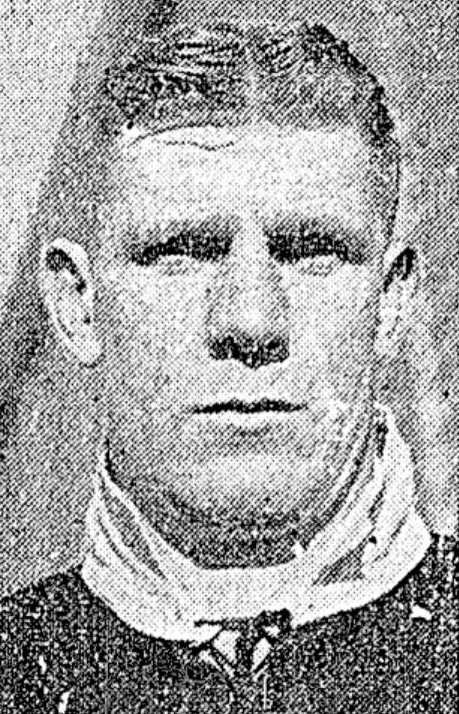
Wally Tittleton, the clever Richmond centre who was now in his 5th season for them after previously playing for Ngāruawahia (1930–33) and Taupiri (1934–35) in the Waikato. He had also played 15 games for New Zealand.

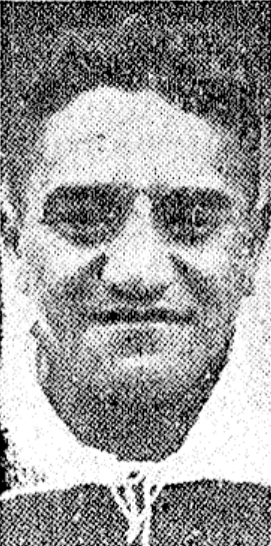
Peter Mahima the Manukau halfback who played an excellent game. He was in his final season for Manukau after beginning his time with them in 1936.

The Marist forwards were impressive in their 13–5 loss to Richmond and only tired towards the end. The ground was muddy with a greasy ball with handling mistakes from both teams common. For Richmond Wally Tittleton "gave his usual brainy exhibition at centre, making an admirable link between the five eighths and the wings, while his defence was excellent". C Williams gave "smart service" from halfback, and Abbie Graham and Dave Solomon "came into their own in the second spell". Graham was able to dummy past his opposite twice and break straight through leading to tries. Jack McLeod and L Williams were the best of Richmond's forwards. The Marist fullback, Bill Glover, "was his usual aggressive self, and presented an adamant front to the Richmond raids". In Manukau's victory over Newton, 29 to 10, their halfback, Peter Mahima, was "brilliant". "He made many fine openings, and was responsible for starting movements which earned at least three tries". Manukau only led 11–10 at halftime but Newton was unable to add to its score and Manukau dominated the second half. In the loose for Manukau, Steve Watene, one day short of his 30th birthday, "played splendidly, his knowledge of positional play often turning defence into attack. Good handling gave Watene several splendid tries. [Pita] Ririnui also played a dashing game, and was difficult to pull down ... [while George] Shilton was also prominent". In their backs, aside from Mahima, Tommy Chase "was in excellent form at centre, and made many fine openings for the wingers". Jack Hemi played well at five eighths, and P Awhitu "on the wing showed plenty of dash and scored two tries". In the Newton backs, they missed Wilfred Brimble, but Claude Dempsey "was a tower of strength to his team" at fullback. F Oliver worked hard behind the scrum, and Linley Sanders played well in the five eighths. Frank Zimmerman impressed in the forwards. Ponsonby upset Mount Albert with Arthur Kay "a dominant figure" who was "more than a match for the Mount Albert back line, which was unbalanced and lacked its usual combination". Shilling was dependable at fullback for the winners, while Roy Nurse was dangerous in the three quarters and "backed up the clever efforts of [John Bakalich] and Kay. Huck Flanagan hooked well in their forwards and was well supported by Hector Dunning, W Briggs, and Allen Laird. In Papakura's loss to City, a feature of the game was the excellent forward play of Harold Milliken and John Fogarty who were in the middle of every attack and Fogarty narrowly missed scoring twice in the second half. The whole City pack also played well while in their backs Warwick Clarke played a "splendid game" at fullback "and was really responsible for his teams success. His defence was superb". At centre Nesbit, and five eighths, Graham Simpson, both "played heady games" while Owen Highes "did a lot of useful work at halfback". In Papakura's backline H Hogan was useful at halfback, Ewan Cossey prominent at five eighths, and Ray Halsey "played a sound game at centre".

17 August	Richmond	13–5 (5-0)	Marist	Carlaw Park 1
3:10	Try: H Harrison, Wally Tittleton, Dave Solomon; Con: Jack McLeod 2		Try: Jimmy Matthews; Con: John Anderson	Attendance: 4,000; Referee: Owen Chalmers

17 August	Ponsonby	13–3	Mount Albert	Carlaw Park 1
1:45	Try: Hector Dunning, Roy Nurse, Hughes; Con: Arthur Kay 2		Try: Basil Cranch	Attendance: 4,000; Referee: George Kelly

17 August	Manukau	29-10 (11-10)	Newton	Carlaw Park 2
3:10	Try: Steve Watene 3, P Awhitu 2, Pita Ririnui, Tommy Chase; Con: Jack Hemi 3 Pen: Jack Hemi		Try: Beattie, Mortimer Stephens; Con: Claude Dempsey; Drop: Bill McKenzie	Attendance: 4,000; Referee: Stuart Billman

17 August	City	6–5	Papakura	Carlaw Park 2
1:45	Try: Graham Simpson, Bill Jackson		Try: Clarke; Con: J McInnes	Attendance: 4,000; Referee: Roy Otto

==== Round 17 ====
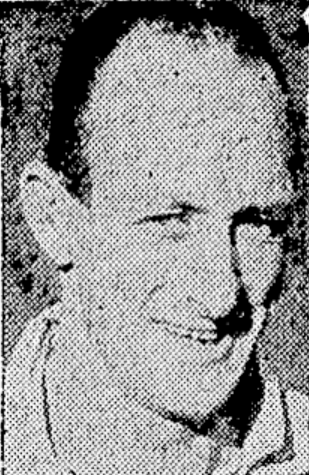
Len Jordan debuted for Ponsonby.

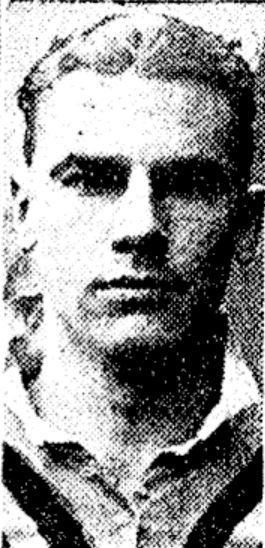
Brian Riley in his first appearance of the season for Ponsonby.

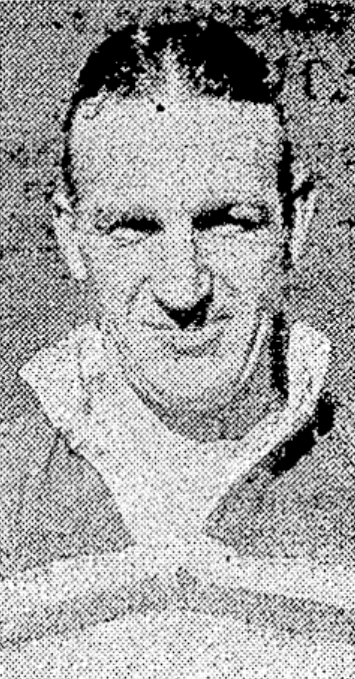
Roy Clark on debut for North Shore

The Manukau v North Shore game featured "spectacular play" with the advantage "fluctuating in an exciting fashion" throughout the first half with play sweeping "from end to end by speedy bouts of handling". In the Manukau back line Ralph Martin defended well at fullback, Peter Mahima got the ball away quickly from the scrum and Jack Hemi and Joe Broughton "revealing fine constructive ability at five eighths, and Tommy Chase, Butler, and P Awhitu playing their part". Len Jordan who would later represent New Zealand made his debut for Ponsonby after transferring from Northcote's senior B side. It was said that he was a player with a future. His try was from 40 yards out and featured "a beautiful swerving run". The Herald wrote that he was "subtle in his methods and fast off the mark". Also debuting for North Shore was Roy Clark. He would also represent New Zealand in the late 1940s and kicked a drop goal for Shore. In the same match former international Brian Riley made his first appearance of the season and was said to have retained "excellent attacking ability". In the Ponsonby forwards W Briggs and Allen Laird "made a good impression, especially the former, who is one o the best forwards in the code for his size", and Huck Flanagan again hooked successfully for them. He had debuted for them in 1933 and represented New Zealand in 1935 and 1937. The game between City and Newton started 25 minutes and as a result they played short halves. The game was described as "ragged and uninteresting". Newton lost their winger, Mortimer Stephens to injury in the first half and he was replaced by Walter 'Riki' Brimble. City fullback, Warwick Clarke played a fine game for them and "he rarely missed the ball on the full and frequently raced to the three quarters and started attacking movements". The best of the City forwards was Hawea Mataira who played his first game for three weeks. The match between Mount Albert and Papakura did not have any point scorers attributed. It was played at Fowld's Park in Morningside and like many suburban games did not have a reporter sent to it. There was a list published of point scorers to this point of the season which indicated Bert Leatherbarrow had 65 points from 15 tries and 10 goals which suggested that he must have scored 2 tries and kicked 6 goals in the match. Papakura had many injuries and had to play the second half with just 11 players at which time the score was 29–22.

24 August	Manukau	13–7	North Shore	Carlaw Park 1
1:45	Try: Ralph Martin, Jack Hemi, W Butler; Con: Jack Hemi; Pen: Jack Hemi		Try: Bruce Donaldson; Con: Jack Smith; Drop: Roy Clark	Attendance: 4000; Referee: George Kelly

24 August	Ponsonby	21–3	Marist	Carlaw Park 2
3:10	Try: Roy Nurse 2, Len Jordan, Allen Laird, Brian Riley; Con: Arthur Kay 2 Pen: Arthur Kay		Try: Don McLeod	Attendance: 4,000; Referee: Stuart Billman

24 August	City	10–3 (7-0)	Newton	Carlaw Park 2
1:45	Try: Hawea Mataira, Owen Hughes; Pen: Warwick Clarke 2		Try: Jack Taylor	Attendance: 4000; Referee: J O’Shannesy

24 August	Mount Albert	48–22	Papakura	Fowlds Park, Morningside
3:00	Try: Bert Leatherbarrow 2, + others unknown Con: Bert Leatherbarrow 6		Try: Unknown	Referee: Jack Donovan

==== Round 18 ====
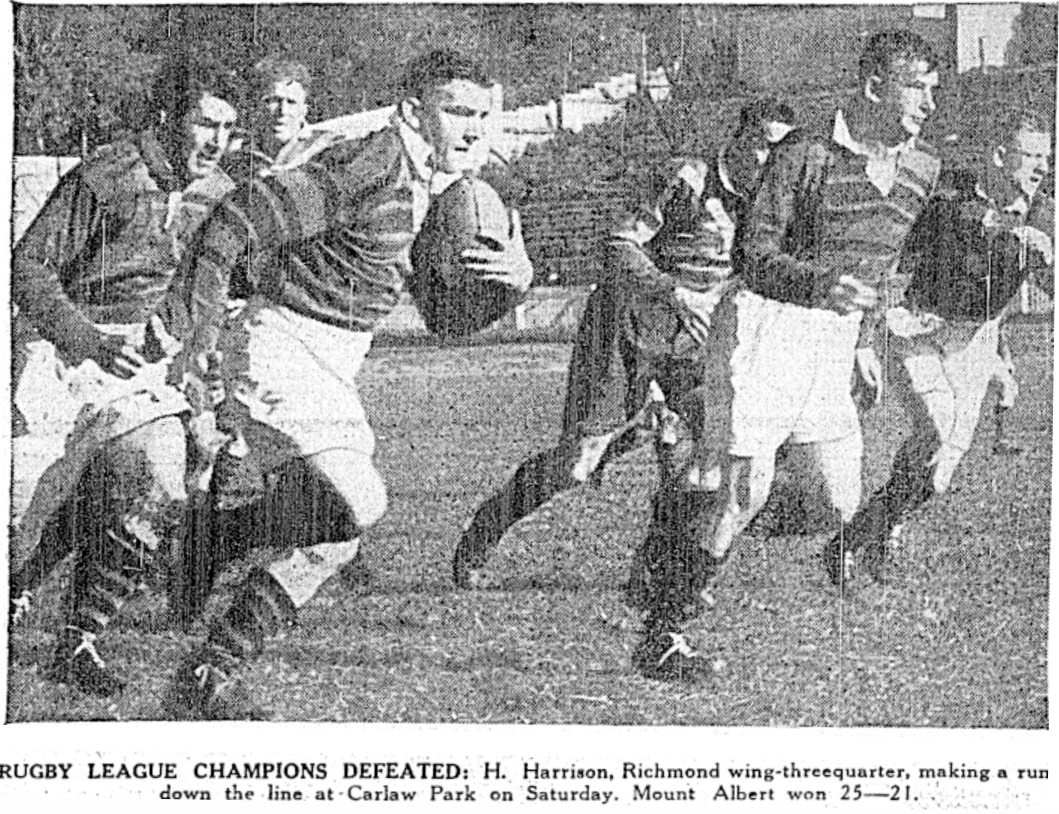
H Harrison (Richmond) with the ball in their match with Mount Albert

Somewhat confusingly the ARL originally decided to just play the Mount Albert – Richmond game in round 18. Richmond had already secured the title but the runner up needed to be decided in the event of Richmond also winning the Roope Rooster as this would mean the Stormont Shield would need to be played against the genuine second placed side. Mount Albert complicated matters by upsetting Richmond which then tied them for second with North Shore. In order to make it fair North Shore then played their round 18 match 2 weeks later against Newton at the Devonport Domain in a match which doubled as a Phelan Shield second round match. They won 33–15 to finish runner up on their own. With little riding on the game for Newton they fielded several 3rd grade players. Ultimately Richmond did indeed win the Roope Rooster meaning they played North Shore in the Stormont Shield with the Devonport-based side winning. Mount Albert scored seven tries in their 25–21 win with loose forward Joseph Gunning and halfback Les Clement both scoring doubles. Colin Cowley played an excellent game for Mount Albert at centre three-quarter giving thrust to their attack and opening up play for his wingers. Richmond only managed three tries but their tally was boosted by six goals from the boot of Frank Furnell who had returned to the side during the year after spending time working and playing in Wellington. Bob Banham gave a "brainy" exhibition at first five eighth for Mount Albert getting Malcolm Cato and Colin Cowley "running with brick passes". Gunning was the best forward on the ground "and followed the ball in terrier fashion from start to finish, being responsible for brilliant attack and defensive work". Dave Solomon, Abbie Graham, and Wally Tittleton were the most dangerous Richmond backs but even they struggled to make inroads into the Mount Albert defence until late in the game. In their forwards Merv Devine played well at lock after replacing Maurice Potter who was injured during the first half.

7 September	Mount Albert	25–21	Richmond	Carlaw Park
3:00	Try: Joseph Gunning 2, Arthur McInnarney, Basil Cranch, Jack Tristram; Con: Les Clement 2, Bob Banham; Pen: Bob Banham 2		Try: Wally Tittleton, H Harrison, Abbie Graham; Con: Frank Furnell 2 Pen: Frank Furnell 4	Attendance: 5,000; Referee: George Kelly

21 September	North Shore	33–15	Newton	Devonport Domain
3:00	Try: Jack Smith 2, Thomas Field 2, Harry Zane-Zaninovich, Bruce Donaldson, Ted Scott; Con: Jack Smith 3, Ted Scott, Verdun Scott; Pen: Jack Smith		Try: Harry Emus 2, Davison; Con: Harry Emus 2 Pen: Linley Sanders	Referee: Owen Chalmers

=== Roope Rooster ===
Otahuhu United, who had won the Senior B competition were given permission to play in the Roope Rooster competition. They were defeated by Papakura in the first round by 23 points to 9.

==== Round 1 ====
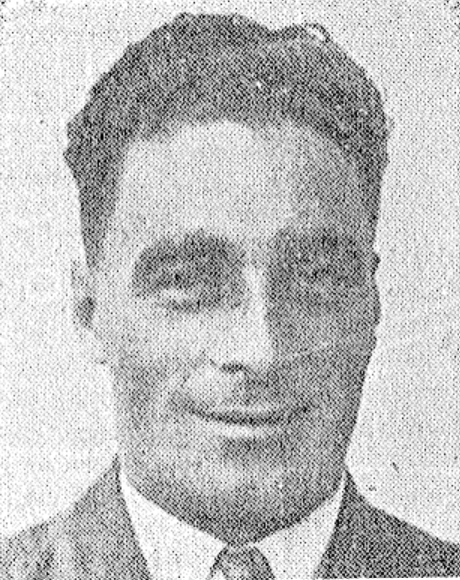
Mortimer Stephens the Newton winger.

Marist scored four unconverted tries to beat Newton who could only manage a solitary penalty to fullback Claude Dempsey who "was brilliant... and frequently extricated his side from awkward situations". For the winners Jimmy Matthews, Dave McWilliams, and John Anderson were "the pivots of the attack". In the Newton backline the equivalent players were Mortimer Stephens, Bill McKenzie, and Walter Brimble. They fielded three third grade players including Harry Burton in the five eighths "who played a good game". Burton would go to war and in 1944 he received the Distinguished Flying Cross award. Otahuhu was very disappointing in their step up to the top division losing 23–9 to Papakura. Their forwards were much lighter than the Papakura pack. They were also not able to field their best team and centre O McManus had to leave the field through injury. For Papakura winger Trevor Hosken scored twice while fullback J McInnes kicked three conversions and a penalty. For the Otahuhu side their best players were P McManus on the wing, Mullins in the five eighths, and T Johnston and Philip in the forwards.

7 September	Marist	12–2	Newton	Carlaw Park 2
3:00	Try: John Anderson, Bill Breed, Gerry Hughes, Dave McWilliams		Pen: Claude Dempsey	Attendance: 5,000; Referee: Jack Donovan

7 September	Papakura	23–9	Otahuhu	Carlaw Park 1
1:30	Try: Trevor Hosken 2, Ray Halsey, H Hogan, Francis; Con: J McInnes 3 Pen: J McInnes		Pen: Mullins 2	Attendance: 5,000; Referee: Ken McIvor

==== Round 2 ====
In the match between Papakura and Manukau, Selwyn Jackson made his debut for Manukau. He was a Hawkes Bay rugby representative and had gone on the 1938 tour of Fiji with New Zealand Māori. Bob Banham played his last match for Mount Albert before returning to Australia. Lindsay Simons played fullback for North Shore after playing there many years ago for North Shore. He made moved to Wellington for work reasons but recently returned to Auckland. As a result, Verdun Scott played on the wing while Jack Smith played at centre three quarter. Simons was nearing his 31st birthday and was described as slow and his tackling weak on occasions.

14 September	Mount Albert	23–14	North Shore	Carlaw Park 1
3:00	Try: Bert Leatherbarrow 2, Jack Tristram, Les Clement, Arthur McInnarney; Con: Bert Leatherbarrow, Les Clement 2 Pen: Bob Banham		Try: Verdun Scott, Clarrie Petersen; Con: Jack Smith; Pen: Verdun Scott 3	Referee: Ken McIvor

14 September	Ponsonby	18–12	Marist	Carlaw Park 1
1:30	Try: Brian Riley 2, Len Jordan, Hector Dunning; Con: Arthur Kay 3		Try: Gerry Hughes, John Anderson; Con: John Anderson; Pen: John Anderson 2	Referee: Stuart Billman

14 September	Richmond	32–26 (8-13)	City	Carlaw Park 2
3:00	Try: Leo Davis 2, Merv Devine, Alf Broadhead, Williams, Abbie Graham, Wally Tittleton, Frank Furnell; Con: Frank Furnell, Dave Solomon; Pen: Frank Furnell		Try: Chappie Gould, A Smith, Graham Simpson, Owen Hughes, J.A. Thompson, Bill Jackson; Con: Warwick Clarke; Pen: Warwick Clarke, W Mataira 2	Referee: George Kelly

14 September	Papakura	25–21	Manukau	Carlaw Park 2
3:00	Try: John Fogarty, Ray Halsey, Trevor Hosken, Wright, Penfold; Con: J McInnes; Pen: J McInnes 4		Try: Tommy Chase, George Shilton, P Rei, Wiremu Te Tai, Selwyn Jackson; Con: Jack Hemi; Pen: Jack Hemi 2	Referee: Jack Hawkes

==== Semi finals ====
Ponsonby fielded one of their best backlines in several seasons with a mix of youth and experience with three future New Zealand league or union representatives and two former ones. Arthur Kay in the five eighths was outstanding for Ponsonby, scoring three tries and kicking seven goals for a personal haul of 23 points, one of the largest for many years in senior club league in Auckland. The Herald said it was one of the best exhibitions seen at Carlaw Park for many years. With him in the backs was Brian Riley at centre three-quarter, a teammate since they both made their Ponsonby debuts in 1933. Riley scored four tries, two of which came from brilliant combination with Kay. Behind them at fullback was a third grade player named Scott who "showed the coolness of a veteran and never put a foot wrong all day". The player referred to was Bob Scott who switched to rugby union during the war years while involved with the military and would go on to become a well known All Black who played 52 times for them including 17 tests. Roy Nurse also played well on the wing as did Carr, while Len Jordan at first five eighths also made some "fine openings". In the forward pack, Edgar Morgan made his first appearance of the season after first playing for Ponsonby in 1936. He was over 13 stone in weight "and excels in open play".

21 September	Ponsonby	41–13	Mount Albert	Carlaw Park 1
3:00	Try: Brian Riley 4, Arthur Kay 3, Roy Nurse, Roy Gee; Con: Arthur Kay 5 Pen: Arthur Kay 2		Try: Joseph Gunning, Basil Cranch, Ernie Pinches; Con: Bert Leatherbarrow; Drop: Malcolm Cato	Referee: Jack Donovan

21 September	Richmond	27–13	Papakura	Carlaw Park 1
1:30	Try: Wally Tittleton 2, Maurice Potter, George Mitchell, C Williams, Dave Solomon, John Crookall; Con: Edgar Takle 3		Try: Ray Halsey; Con: J McInnes; Pen: J McInnes 4	Referee: George Kelly

==== Final ====
28 September	Richmond	31–7	Ponsonby	Carlaw Park 1
3:00	Try: Wally Tittleton 3, George Mitchell 2, H Harrison, Edgar Takle; Con: Jack McLeod 4, Edgar Takle		Try: Arthur Kay; Con: Arthur Kay; Pen: Arthur Kay 2	Attendance: 6,000; Referee: Jack Donovan

=== Phelan Shield ===
==== Round 1 ====
14 September	Otahuhu	31–28	Newton	Outer Domain
3:00	Try: Unknown scorers		Try: Unknown scorers	Referee: E Lennie

==== Round 2 ====
The North Shore v Newton game at Devonport Domain doubled as a championship match which had concluded weeks earlier but was needed to confirm final placings in order to find the Stormont Shield opponent for Richmond. Jack Hemi scored all of Manukau's points from the boot with five penalties. With the scores tied 10–10 at the end of the game Manukau and Marist played an extra five minutes each way but were unable to break the deadlock which forced a replay the following weekend which Manukau won comfortably. Jack Smith "was easily the best player on the field" in North Shore's comfortable 33–15 win over Newton and he "worried the opposition repeatedly with his strong and elusive running". Ted Scott, their regular loose forward played out of position at halfback and was "slow" with the only other back to impress being Eric Chatham. In their forwards Tom Field, Zane-Zaninovich, and Clarrie Petersen were the hardest workers, showing "up spasmodically with clever dribbling and free handling".

21 September	Manukau	10–10	Marist	Carlaw Park 1
1:30	Pen: Jack Hemi 5		Try: Bill Breed, J Smith; Con: John Anderson; Pen: John Anderson	Referee: Ken McIvor

21 September	City	16–5	Otahuhu	Carlaw Park 2
3:00	Try: Chappie Gould 2, Alan Donovan, A Smith; Con: Warwick Clarke; Pen: Warwick Clarke		Try: T Johnson; Pen: Joffre Johnson	Referee: Stuart Billman

21 September	North Shore	33–15	Newton	Devonport Domain
3:00	Try: Jack Smith 2, Tom Field 2, Zane-Zaninovich, Bruce Donaldson, Ted Scott; Con: Jack Smith 3, Ted Scott, Verdun Scott; Pen: Jack Smith		Try: Harry Emus 2, Davison; Con: Harry Emus 2 Pen: Linley Sanders	Referee: Owen Chalmers

==== Round 3 ====
W Mataira was sent off for City in their match with Papakura.

28 September	Mount Albert	10–9	North Shore	Carlaw Park 1
1:45	Try: Bert Leatherbarrow 2 Con: Bert Leatherbarrow 2		Try: Leo Davis; Con: Jack Smith; Pen: Jack Smith 2	Attendance: 6,000; Referee: Owen Chalmers

28 September	Manukau	23–9	Marist	Carlaw Park 2
3:00	Try: Joe Broughton 2, P Awhitu, Ralph Martin, Freddie Maguire; Con: Jack Hemi 3 Pen: Jack Hemi		Try: Gerry Hughes, Bill Breed, Len Barchard	Attendance: 6,000; Referee: Ken McIvor

28 September	City	14–0	Papakura	Carlaw Park 2
1:45	Try: A Smith, Alan Donovan, Owen Hughes, Hawea Mataira; Con: Ellis			Attendance: 6,000; Referee: George Kelly

==== Semi final ====
Jack Hemi once again proved his worth for the Manukau team at fullback. He scored two tries and kicked three conversions in their comfortable win over City. He not only ran into position after receiving kicks but on two occasions joined into the passing and scored. Robert Deverall, the former Huntly club, and South Auckland (Waikato) representative player made a difference in the Manukau five eighths.

5 October	Manukau	27–16	City	Carlaw Park 1
1:45	Try: Jack Hemi 2, Robert Deverall 2, Butler, Puti Tipene Watene, Pita Ririnui; Con: Jack Hemi 3		Try: Jim Gould 2, J Hutchinson, Chappie Gould; Con: Warwick Clarke 2	Attendance: 5,000; Referee: Ken McIvor

==== Final ====
Jack Hemi started the game by sending the kickoff between the posts. Then a while later he converted the first try which brought up his 100th point in all games for the season. Hemi added three more goals to finish with 108 points and then a week later in a friendly rugby game for Manukau and a Tauranga Māori side he kicked three more goals. Following the game Bert Leatherbarrow announced that he was retiring. An article in the Auckland Star said “he made a start with football when seven years of age and was then goalkeeper for the North Shore fifth grade soccer football team. In his school days at Devonport he played rugby, and he also played rugby in North Auckland and Taranaki. Then he played league in the North Shore junior grades”. Leatherbarrow was selected in the New Zealand side in 1939. Despite the announcement he continued to play the following season and ended his career with City Rovers in 1944 and 1945 amassing over 200 career senior rugby league games, a record for an Auckland club footballer at this time.

12 October	Manukau	20–14	Mount Albert	Carlaw Park 1
3:00	Try: Kelly, Pita Ririnui, Selwyn Jackson, George Moyes; Con: Jack Hemi 3 Drop: Jack Hemi		Try: Ernie Pinches, Brady 2, Jack Tristram; Con: H MacLachlan	Referee: Ken McIvor

=== Stormont Shield ===
==== Final ====
Merv Devine and McWilliams the fullback went to camp to prepare for departing for World War 2 on the Thursday prior to the game but it was hoped that they would be able to travel back for the game however they were not. At halftime Richmond led 10-2 but the second half was all in North Shore's favour and they held Richmond scoreless and scored three tries, converted one, and kicked a penalty to win 15–10. Jack Smith "gave one of the best displays seen at Carlaw Park this season".

5 October	North Shore	15–10	Richmond	Carlaw Park 1
3:00	Try: Ted Scott, Bruce Graham, Davis; Con: Jack Smith; Pen: Jack Smith 2		Try: Dave Solomon, Jack McLeod; Con: Jack McLeod 2	Attendance: 5,000; Referee: George Kelly

=== Top try scorers and point scorers ===
Scoring from all senior club competitive matches in Auckland including preliminary round games but excluding friendly matches against out of town opponents. Laurie Mills was the top try scorer despite only playing 14 games. He departed in August for World War 2 where he was killed on December 1 in Libya 1941 after having fought in the Greece and Crete campaigns. Bert Leatherbarrow scored 13 tries from the hooker position which was a very unusual feat. Jack Smith was the top scorer in the competition with 122 while, despite missing the early season matches for Ponsonby, Arthur Kay was second with 115 including 50 goals. He had only begun kicking late in his career but showed remarkable ability at it.

Top try scorers
Rk	Player	Team	Games	Tries
1	Laurie Mills	Richmond	14	14
2=	Bert Leatherbarrow	Mount Albert	20	13
2=	Wally Tittleton	Richmond	20	13
4=	Joseph Gunning	Mount Albert	22	11
4=	Jimmy Matthews	Marist	20	11
6	Arthur McInnarney	Mount Albert	18	10
7=	Dave McWilliams	Marist	17	9
7=	Bruce Donaldson	North Shore	14	9
7=	Ted Scott	North Shore	17	9
10=	Abbie Graham	Richmond	20	8
10=	Jim Gould	City	19	8
10=	George Mitchell	Richmond	20	8
10=	Roy Nurse	Ponsonby	18	8
10=	A Smith	City	19	8
10=	Jack Smith	North Shore	19	8

Top point scorers
Rk	Player	Team	G	T	C	P	DG	Pts
1	Jack Smith	North Shore	19	8	24	25	0	122
2	Arthur Kay	Ponsonby	16	5	26	24	0	115
3	Jack Hemi	Manukau	15	4	21	18	1	92
4	J McInnes	Papakura	20	3	16	22	0	85
5	Bob Banham	Mount Albert	19	1	25	15	0	83
6	John Anderson	Marist	18	7	15	15	0	81
7=	Tommy Chase	Manukau	18	5	14	10	0	63
7=	Bert Leatherbarrow	Mount Albert	20	13	6	6	0	63
9	Bruce Donaldson	North Shore	14	9	8	3	1	51
10	Trevor Bramley	Richmond	9	4	10	8	0	48

== Senior reserve competitions ==
A huge number of matches in the reserve grade competition were neither listed in the newspaper nor had their result reported. As such the records are very incomplete. It was not until mid September that it was reported that Richmond had won the reserve grade competition. Most teams would have played approximately 11 games but the majority had less than half their scores reported. Papakura did not field a reserve grade team most likely due to the effect of World War 2 on playing numbers.

=== Norton Cup standings ===
Team	Pld	W	D	L	F	A	Pts
Richmond Rovers reserves	4	3	1	0	85	24	7*
Mount Albert reserves	8	7	0	1	167	57	14*
City Rovers reserves	7	5	1	1	103	46	11*
North Shore Albions reserves	6	2	0	4	45	102	4*
Marist Old Boys reserves	3	1	0	2	22	49	2*
Newton Rangers reserves	4	1	0	3	31	92	2*
Manukau reserves	5	1	0	4	29	97	2*

=== Norton Cup results ===
	Date		Score		Score	Referee	Venue
Round 1	27 April	Richmond	?	Newton	?	T Evans	Auckland Domain 2, 3:00
–	27 April	Mount Albert	?	Manukau	?	Arthur Lennie	Auckland Domain 2, 1:30
–	27 April	Ponsonby	?	Papakura	?	Roy Otto	Auckland Domain 6, 3:00
–	27 April	Marist	?	North Shore	?	J Jones	Auckland Domain 6, 1:30
Round 2	4 May	Marist	10	Manukau	5	George Kelly	Auckland Domain 1, 3:00
–	4 May	Richmond	33	North Shore	5	Roy Otto	Auckland Domain 1, 1:30
–	4 May	Newton	12	Ponsonby	11	Jack Donovan	Auckland Domain 5, 3:00
–	4 May	Mount Albert	21	City	6	A Appleton	Auckland Domain 5, 1:30
Round 3	11 May	North Shore	13	Ponsonby	9	Ernest Korn	Auckland Domain 6, 3:00
–	11 May	Richmond	34	Manukau	2	T Evans	Auckland Domain 2, 1:30
–	11 May	City	20	Marist	2	T Evans	Auckland Domain 2, 1:30
Round 4	18 May	Mount Albert	24	Marist	10	Stuart Billman	Auckland Domain 2, 3:00
–	18 May	City	5	Richmond	5	Ken McIvor	Auckland Domain 2, 1:30
–	18 May	Manukau	12	Ponsonby	11	A Pearson	Auckland Domain 6, 1:30
Round 5	25 May	Mount Albert	29	Newton	9	Jack Hawkes	Carlaw Park 2, 1:30
Round 6	1 June	Richmond	?	Ponsonby	?	Jack Donovan	Auckland Domain 3, 3:00
–	1 June	City	?	North Shore	?	J Jones	Auckland Domain 3, 1:30
Round 7	8 June	North Shore	?	Mount Albert	?	Jack Donovan	Carlaw Park 2, 3:00
–	8 June	Manukau	?	City	?	George Kelly	Carlaw Park 2, 1:30
–	8 June	Marist	?	Newton	?	Owen Chalmers	Auckland Domain 2, 3:00
Round 8	29 June	City	17	Newton	3	?	?
Round 9	6 July	Mount Albert	32	North Shore	4	?	?
–	6 July	City	29	Manukau	2	?	?
Round 10	13 July	Mount Albert	13	Manukau	8	?	?
Round 11	20 July	City	13	Mount Albert	5	?	?
–	20 July	Richmond	13	North Shore	12	?	?
Round 12	27 July	North Shore	3	Ponsonby	2	?	?
Round 13	10 August	Mount Albert	35	Newton	7	?	?
–	10 August	City	13	North Shore	8	?	?
Round 14	17 August	Mount Albert	8	Ponsonby	0	?	?

=== Stallard Cup (knockout competition) ===
Several of the fixtures were not reported in the newspapers including the final. The knockout competition was between reserve grade sides and the senior B teams.

Stallard Cup results
	Date		Score		Score	Referee	Venue
Round 1	7 September	Ellerslie	WBD	Manukau	LBD	J Jones	Carlaw Park 2, 1:30
–	7 September	Point Chevalier	12	North Shore	10	O Chalmers	Outer Domain, 3:00
–	7 September	Mount Albert	9	Richmond	9	A Ancell	Outer Domain, 1:30
Round 2	14 September	City	10	Point Chevalier	5	J Jones	Outer Domain, 1:30
–	14 September	Ellerslie	W	Newton	L	J O'Shaunessey	Outer Domain, 1:30
–	14 September	Ponsonby	?	Northcote	?	J Macown	Auckland Domain 2, 1:30
–	14 September	Richmond	?	Mount Albert	?	T Ewans	Auckland Domain 2, 1:30
Semi final	21 September	Ellerslie	14	City	10	?	?
Semi final	?	?	?	?	?	?	?
Final	?	Ellerslie	?	?	?	?	?

== Senior B grade competitions ==
=== Sharman Cup standings ===
Team	Pld	W	D	L	F	A	Pts
Otahuhu Rovers	9	7	0	2	105	54	14*
Northcote & Birkenhead Ramblers	5	2	0	3	44	41	4*
Ellerslie United	6	4	0	2	41	40	8*
Point Chevalier	5	1	0	4	36	50	2
Newton Rangers senior B	3	0	0	3	9	50	0

=== Sharman Cup results ===
R.V. withdrew their senior B team after the first round. It is unlikely that they played their opening match against Northcote. There we no fixtures or results recorded in round 9.

	Date		Score		Score	Referee	Venue
Round 1	4 May	Otahuhu	?	Newton	?	A Ansell	Outer Domain, 3:00
–	4 May	R.V.	?	Northcote	?	J Hawkes	Victoria Park 2, 3:00
–	4 May	Point Chevalier	9	Ellerslie	10	J Jones	Walker Park, Point Chevalier, 3:00
Round 2	11 May	Otahuhu	10	Point Chevalier	8	H Tate	Otahuhu, 3:00
–	11 May	Newton	?	Northcote	?	J Hawkes	Stafford Park, Northcote, 3:00
Round 3	18 May	Otahuhu	5	Ellerslie	10	L Evans	Mount Wellington, 3:00
–	18 May	Point Chevalier	?	Northcote	?	J Jones	Walker Park, Point Chevalier, 3:00
Round 4	25 May	Point Chevalier	12	Newton	9	E Pope	Outer Domain, 3:00
–	25 May	Northcote	6	Ellerslie	7	J O’Shannessey	Stafford Park, Northcote, 3:00
Round 5	1 June	Otahuhu	7	Northcote	15	A Ansell	Otahuhu, 3:00
–	1 June	Ellerslie	7	Newton	0	A Pearson	Mount Wellington, 3:00
Round 6	8 June	Otahuhu	31	Newton	0	E Pope	Otahuhu, 3:00
–	8 June	Ellerslie	?	Point Chevalier	?	T Evans	Auckland Domain 2, 3:00
Round 7	15 June	Otahuhu	12	Point Chevalier	0	?	?
Round 8	22 June	Otahuhu	8	Ellerslie	0	?	?
Round 10	6 July	Otahuhu	10	Northcote	5	?	?
Round 11	13 July	Otahuhu	12	Ellerslie	7	?	?
–	13 July	Northcote	9	Point Chevalier	7	?	?
Championship final	20 July	Otahuhu	10	Northcote	9	?	?

=== Knockout competition ===
In recent seasons when the senior B championship had concluded a 'knockout' competition was held which was run more as a full round robin than a knockout. It featured Otahuhu United, Point Chevalier, Northcote & Birkenhead Ramblers, and Ellerslie United. The competition was named "Walmesley Shield" in previous seasons but the name was not used in 1940. Otahuhu United won after beating their other 3 opponents over consecutive weekends.

==== Knockout results ====
	Date		Score		Score	Referee	Venue
Round 1	27 July	Otahuhu	19	Point Chevalier	5	?	?
–	27 July	Ellerslie	14	Northcote	13	?	?
Round 2	3 August	Otahuhu	22	Ellerslie	5	?	?
–	3 August	Point Chevalier	13	Northcote	8	?	?
Round 3	10 August	Ellerslie	16	Point Chevalier	5	?	?
–	10 August	Otahuhu	6	Northcote	3	?	?

== Other club matches and lower grades ==
=== Lower grade clubs ===
The Intermediate Primary Schools competition was reportedly won by Newton however later in the year it was reported that Marist beat R.V. by 5 points to 3 which drew the two teams level in the competition and they therefore shared the title however there was no Marist team competing in the grade so it is probably in error and for a different grade or competition. It was also reported that Mount Albert beat Avondale 16–0 in the Intermediate grade final though this was likely for the A section winner. It is possible that Mount Albert was defeated by Newton in a playoff between the winners of the two sections.

==== 3rd Grade ====
The 3rd Grade competition was won by Otahuhu. They played a game against "the rest" of the competition on September 28 and won 23 points to 5. Mount Albert were close runners up. The newspapers stopped reporting the fixtures mid season so the number of games played would be significantly higher than the standings suggests. R.V. defaulted 2 games mid season and then withdrew from the competition.

Team	Pld	W	D	L	F	A	Pts
Otahuhu Rovers	19	16	1	1	360	69	33
Mount Albert United	18	14	0	4	217	119	28
Richmond Rovers	11	6	0	2	128	56	12
Ponsonby United	12	6	0	5	73	109	12
Newton Rangers	12	4	1	4	94	98	9
Point Chevalier	11	3	0	8	84	98	6
Marist Old Boys	13	3	0	7	80	145	6
Glenora	14	1	1	8	85	168	3
Avondale	9	1	0	4	36	62	2
Papakura	7	0	0	4	12	93	0
R.V.	9	0	0	7	3	166	0

==== 4th Grade ====
City won the championship but not all results were reported so the table is compiled of known scores only.

Team	Pld	W	D	L	F	A	Pts
City Rovers	10	5	0	3	62	44	10
Richmond Rovers	11	7	0	3	154	67	14
Avondale	12	6	1	4	90	87	13
Otahuhu Rovers	12	5	2	4	106	59	12
North Shore Albions	11	5	1	3	88	68	11
Point Chevalier	8	4	1	1	66	53	9
Ellerslie United	9	4	1	4	68	92	9
Papakura	11	2	1	4	36	51	5
Green Lane	12	1	1	7	50	116	3
Newmarket	6	1	0	4	18	32	2
Glenora	6	0	0	4	4	73	0

==== 5th Grade ====
Richmond won the 5th Grade beating City in the final, 22 to 5 on September 7. It is possible that it was not the actual final and rather the game in which Richmond secured the championship. They also won the knockout competition when they beat Ellerslie 9-5 on September 28.

Team	Pld	W	D	L	F	A	Pts
Richmond Rovers	10	10	0	0	158	39	20
City Rovers	11	5	1	5	45	83	11
Otahuhu Rovers	13	10	0	3	130	35	20
Ellerslie United	9	6	0	2	94	25	12
Mount Albert United	14	5	1	7	86	101	11
Newmarket	8	3	0	3	92	49	6
Ponsonby United	10	1	2	5	20	47	4
Northcote & Birkenhead Ramblers	11	1	0	8	37	213	2
Manukau	9	0	0	8	29	99	0

==== 6th Grade ====
Point Chevalier won the championship. Very few of the results were reported during the season so the standings are incomplete and compiled from known scores.

Team	Pld	W	D	L	F	A	Pts
Point Chevalier	9	5	1	0	86	11	11
Otahuhu Rovers	3	3	0	0	93	0	6
City Rovers	5	2	1	1	32	9	5
Newton Rangers	8	2	0	3	30	73	4
Papakura	8	1	2	4	36	82	3
Richmond Rovers	6	0	0	4	3	73	0

==== Seventh Grade ====
Otahuhu won the championship and also beat Ellerlie in the knockout final on August 3 by 9 points to 5.

Team	Pld	W	D	L	F	A	Pts
Otahuhu Rovers	9	8	1	0	123	19	17
Ellerslie United	8	3	1	3	41	43	7
Papakura	6	0	0	3	3	68	0
North Shore Albions	6	0	0	4	0	37	0

==== Schoolboys ====
===== Senior (Lou Rout Trophy) =====
Richmond won the senior schoolboy championship. The newspapers stopped reporting lower grade fixtures after June 8 and only a handful of results were reported all season so the standings are compiled only from the known scores which represent about 20% of all games.

Team	Pld	W	D	L	F	A	Pts
Richmond	7	3	0	0	82	8	6
Ellerslie	9	4	1	1	35	35	9
Green Lane	6	1	1	1	28	5	3
Point Chevalier	7	1	1	1	33	8	3
Newton	7	1	0	1	13	11	2
Ponsonby	9	0	1	4	11	122	2
North Shore	6	0	0	1	7	8	0
Newmarket	4	0	0	1	3	17	0
Northcote	5	0	0	0	0	0	0

===== Intermediate (Newport and Eccles Memorial Shield) =====
The Intermediate Grade was split into two sections. Mount Albert won Section A when they beat Avondale 16-0 in the final on August 24. Newton won section B. On October 26 during the Auckland Rugby League's schoolboys sports meeting the intermediate championship 'final' was played between R.V. and Marist. Marist won, and as that drew them level on points it was decided to "bracket" the two teams as championship winners. Late in the season the two sections played a combined knockout tournament. The last known result was a 3-2 win by Mount Albert over Green Lane on September 21 though the competition still had at least a week to run. The majority of results were not reported during the season.

====== Section A ======
Team	Pld	W	D	L	F	A	Pts
Mount Albert	13	9	0	0	136	8	18
Richmond	8	2	0	2	31	58	4
Point Chevalier	7	0	0	3	3	38	3
Avondale	8	0	0	3	8	36	0
Glenora	7	0	0	3	2	40	0

====== Section B ======
Team	Pld	W	D	L	F	A	Pts
R.V.	6	0	1	1	6	10	1
Marist	6	1	0	10	6	4	0
Newton	8	3	0	0	38	3	6
Green Lane	8	4	0	0	43	8	8
Ellerslie	6	2	0	1	11	12	4
Ponsonby	4	0	1	0	0	3	1

===== Junior =====
Green Lane won the championship. There were few results reported so the standings are complied from those which are known.

Team	Pld	W	D	L	F	A	Pts
Green Lane	9	5	0	0	52	5	10
Newmarket	5	1	0	1	11	3	2
R.V.	5	1	0	0	3	0	2
St Benedicts	3	1	0	0	9	0	2
Northcote	9	1	0	2	3	8	2
Marist	2	1	0	0	5	0	2
North Shore	7	0	0	2	0	12	0
Glenora	7	0	0	2	0	14	0
Point Chevalier	7	0	0	1	0	19	0
Ponsonby	7	0	0	2	0	22	0

===== Seven-a-Side =====
There was a seven-a-side competition also played but there were no results reported. Manukau won it and other teams to compete were Richmond, North Shore, Marist, Ponsonby, Newton, Mount Albert, and Papakura.

=== Other senior club matches ===
==== South Auckland v Manukau XIII ====
The team which represented Manukau included players from other clubs. When Jack Brodrick went off injured in the first half he was replaced by Briggs of Ponsonby.

21 July	South Auckland	14–19	Manukau	Davies Park, Huntly
3:00	Try: Unknown points		Try: Wiremu Te Tai, unknown others

==== Manukau v Huntly ====
On 10 August when Manukau had a bye in the Fox Memorial Shield competition they arranged a friendly match with Huntly at Waikaraka Park in Onehunga. The visitors won 23 points to 13.

10 August	Manukau	13–23	Huntly	Waikaraka Park, Onehunga
3:00	Try: Steve Watene, P Awhitu, Tommy Chase; Con: Jack Hemi 2		Try: Deverall 3, McGaughran, Minnix; Con: Moyes 2, T Shaw; Pen: Shaw	Referee: G Kelly

==== Challenge Match ====
On 24 August a match was played between Richmond, the winner of the Auckland club championship and the winner of the Waikato club championship, Huntly South. L Tukere, the 24 year old, 11 stone player was one of the best players for the Huntly South team and had impressed for the South Auckland (Waikato) team at Huntly against the Great Britain team in 1936.

24 August	Richmond	5–10	Huntly South	Carlaw Park 1
3:10	Try: Abbie Graham; Pen: Jack McLeod		Try: Tarplett, Deverall; Con: T Shaw; Pen: T Shaw	Attendance: 4000; Referee: K McIvor

==== North Shore v Huntly ====
North Shore travelled to Huntly to play the local side on 7 September. Only the score was reported though it was noted that the Huntly side was similar to the one which had defeated Richmond two weeks earlier.

7 September	Huntly	15–18	North Shore	Davies Park, Huntly
3:00

==== Stratford v City ====
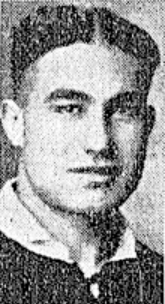
Hawea Mataira who played well for City in their tour match against Stratford in the Taranaki region.

In September City travelled to Stratford with their senior team and their reserve side. The senior side lost to Stratford 9–5. The City side attacked strongly early in the game but Stratford repelled the raids. They then had the majority of the ball but were criticised for kicking and holding on to the ball too much. Bell at second five eighth was the most dangerous of the City backs. A Smith scored their only try and converted it. Hawea Mataira who was promoted in pre-game advertising due to being the only New Zealand international played well in the City forwards, as did A Smith. For Straford their best forwards were Yeates and Harvey. The only try scored by Statford came when they kicked ahead and from the scramble Webb secured the ball and raced over. The side was managed by Ernie Asher who spoke on behalf of the team at the after match function. He said that they understood that they were the first ever visiting rugby league team to visit Stratford.

7 September	Stratford	9–5	City	King Edward Park, Stratford
2:45	Try: Webb; Con: Villers; Pen: Villers 2		Try: A Smith; Con: A Smith	Referee: G Carter

==== Tauranga Māori v Manukau (rugby union game) ====
At the end of the season the Manukau side travelled to Tauranga to play a local side in a game of rugby union which was not unprecedented for them. The team was given the choice of Rorotua or Tauranga by their club officials and chose Tauranga. A large number of the Manukau side had grown up playing rugby union and been recruited to the Manukau club directly out of that code. Several of these players who were named in the Manukau side to play included former rugby union players: Tommy Chase, Pita Ririnui, and Jack Hemi amongst others. A collection was taken at the game to give to 'patriotic funds'. Jack Hemi, well known for his prodigious kick sent the opening kickoff over the dead ball line and when converting Malcolm Cato's try at the end of the match from the halfway line jokingly "trickled" it a few yards. He was then asked to make a proper effort and from the centre spot on halfway slammed it through the posts but was not awarded the points. Cato was a guest player who had spent the season with Mount Albert. Bruce Donaldson, and Beadle also made appearances for Manukau.

19 October	Tauranga Māori (rugby)	13-18 (5-10)	Manukau	Tauranga Domain, Tauranga
3:00	Try: T Kakau 2, V Dixon; Con: M Murray 2		Try: Freddie Maguire, Pita Ririnui, Victor Selwyn, Malcolm Cato; Con: Jack Hemi 3	Referee: J Wilson

== Representative fixtures ==
=== Auckland Māori v South Auckland (Waikato) ===
Ernie Asher was appointed the coach of the Māori side. There was no scoring provided for the match which was said to have been played on a heavy field but with the rain staying away during the match. South Auckland led 14–0 at halftime and Tommy Chase was moved into halfback, with Joe Broughton coming out to the five eighths and this improved the Auckland Māori sides attack considerably allowing them to come back into the game.

26 May	South Auckland (Waikato)	22–20 (14-0)	Auckland Māori	Davies Park, Huntly
2:30	Try: Unknown		Try: Unknown	Referee: Joe Menzies

=== Auckland Māori v Auckland Pākehā (James Carlaw Memorial Trophy) ===
The match between Auckland Māori and Pākehā was originally scheduled to be played on 1 June to celebrate Kings Birthday however due to war being well underway his birthday was not being officially celebrated so it was thought inappropriate to play the match as part of the ‘non existent’ celebrations. The teams were playing for the James Carlaw Memorial Trophy for the first time. Bruce Donaldson dislocated his elbow during the match and missed several club games.

8 June	Auckland Māori	7–10	Auckland Pākehā	Carlaw Park 1
3:00	Try: W Butler; Pen: Tommy Chase, Bruce Donaldson		Try: Arthur Kay, Bob Banham; Pen: Arthur Kay; Drop: Verdun Scott	Attendance: 6,000; Referee: Jack Hawkes

=== Auckland Māori v Pākehā ===
31 August	Auckland Māori	6–27	Auckland Pākehā	Carlaw Park 1
3:00	Pen: Jack Hemi 3		Try: Jack Smith 2, Arthur Kay 2, Bob Banham, Harold Milliken 2 Pen: Jack Smith 3	Attendance: 5,000; Referee: Stuart Billman

=== Auckland Veterans v South Auckland Veterans (Les Lees Cup) ===
There were 19 former New Zealand internationals in the charity game. It was kicked off by Charles Dunning who was in the original All Golds team of 1907–08. The Auckland Veterans side was captained by Stan Prentice. Roy Hardgrave scored two tries for the Auckland team while Ted Mincham scored one in a game refereed by his father, William (Bill) Mincham. Craddock Dufty converted five of their seven tries.

19 October	Auckland Veterans	31–18 (10-15)	South Auckland Veterans	Carlaw Park 1
3:00	Try: Roy Hardgrave 2, Jack Satherley, Horace Hunt, William McLaughlin, Ted Mincham, & 1 unknown Con: Craddock Dufty 5		Try: Smith, M Sherlock 2, W Scott; Con: T Skelton 3	Attendance: 3,000; Referee: William Mincham

=== Tāmaki (Auckland Māori) representative matches played and scoring ===
No	Name	Club Team	Play	Tries	Con	Pen	Points
1	Jack Hemi	Manukau	3	0	0	3	6
2	W Butler	Manukau	3	1	0	0	3
3	Tommy Chase	Manukau	3	0	0	1	2
3	Bruce Donaldson	North Shore	3	0	0	1	2
5	Ralph Martin	Manukau	3	0	0	0	0
5	Hawea Mataira	City	3	0	0	0	0
5	W Mataira	City	3	0	0	0	0
5	Pita Ririnui	Manukau	3	0	0	0	0
5	Dave Solomon	Richmond	3	0	0	0	0
5	Joe Broughton	Manukau	2	0	0	0	0
5	Peter Mahima	Manukau	2	0	0	0	0
5	George Mitchell	Richmond	2	0	0	0	0
5	W Tawhai	Manukau	2	0	0	0	0
5	James (Jack) Tristram	Mount Albert	2	0	0	0	0
5	Walter Brimble	Newton	1	0	0	0	0
5	Jack Brodrick	Manukau	1	0	0	0	0
5	H Kendall	Newton	1	0	0	0	0
5	Jack McLeod	Richmond	1	0	0	0	0
5	M Rei	Manukau	1	0	0	0	0
5	Wiremu Te Tai	Manukau	1	0	0	0	0

=== Auckland Pākehā representative matches played and scoring ===
No	Name	Club Team	Play	Tries	Con	Pen	DG	Points
1	Jack Smith	North Shore	1	2	3	0	0	12
2	Arthur Kay	Ponsonby	2	3	0	1	0	11
3	Bob Banham	Mount Albert	2	2	0	0	0	6
3	Harold Milliken	Papakura	2	2	0	0	0	6
5	Verdun Scott	North Shore	1	0	0	0	1	3
6	Leo Davis	Richmond	2	0	0	0	0	0
6	Roy Nurse	Ponsonby	2	0	0	0	0	0
6	C.W. Williams	Richmond	2	0	0	0	0	0
6	Bill Breed	Marist	1	0	0	0	0	0
6	Claude Dempsey	Newton	1	0	0	0	0	
6	Huck Flanagan	Ponsonby	1	0	0	0	0	0
6	Abbie Graham	Richmond	1	0	0	0	0	0
6	Joseph Gunning	Mount Albert	1	0	0	0	0	0
6	Hermes Hadley	Richmond	1	0	0	0	0	0
6	Bert Leatherbarrow	Mount Albert	1	0	0	0	0	0
6	Laurie Mills	Richmond	1	0	0	0	0	0
6	Bill McKenzie	Newton	1	0	0	0	0	0
6	Harry (Monty) Richards	Newton	1	0	0	0	0	0
6	Edward (Ted) Scott	North Shore	1	0	0	0	0	0
6	Richard (Dick) Shadbolt	Mount Albert	1	0	0	0	0	0
6	Jack Taylor	Newton	1	0	0	0	0	0

=== Auckland Schoolboys Team ===
In August an Auckland schoolboys representative side was selected to travel to New Plymouth to play a Taranaki team. They left by train on 22 August and played their match on Saturday, the 23rd. Auckland won the match 39 points to 3. The team selected was Glean (Ellerslie), Keene, Belsham, Walker (Newton), Purvan (Ponsonby), Robinson, Watson, Clarke, Reeve, Flanagan (Richmond), Smith (North Shore), Robinson (Northcote), and Reilly (Green Lane) with two more to be chosen at a later date (the team had been named on 15 August). L Rout and J Silva were named as the team managers to accompany them on the tour.

Another schoolboys side was selected to play a match against 'The Rest' on 19 October as a curtain-raiser to the Auckland Veterans v South Auckland Veterans side. The result was not reported.

=== Third Grade representative teams ===
On 31 August a 3rd grade representative match was played at Carlaw Park between a suburban 3rd grade representative side and a town representative side. It was a curtain-raiser to the Auckland Māori v Auckland Pakehā match. The result was not reported.

The teams were as follows; Town: Bob Scott, B. Thomas, R.D. Elliot (Ponsonby), K.J. Hagen, H.L. Burton, J. Brady (Newton), C.D. Lorimer, E. McCarthy, J. Brown, H. Phillips, F.R. Williams, A.R. Turner, P.M. Virtue (Richmond), E.H. James, E. Sexton, A.J.B. Donovan (Marist), W. Burgoyne, H. Gordon, S.W. Trainer (City).

Suburban: L. Davis, L. Meyer, W.J. McGuigan (Point Chevalier), L.R. Russer, O. Wilson (Glenora), S.T. Taylor, S. Hetherington, K.W. Morrison, W.J. Green (Mount Albert), K. Simons, A.W. McManus, J. Mullins, C. Duane, R. Martin, B.G. McManus (Otahuhu), A.B. Dormer, L.A. Weigel (Avondale).

== Annual General Meetings and Club News ==
=== Auckland Rugby League Junior Management Committee ===
On 19 March the junior management held their annual meeting. Their report stated that over 1000 players participated in the various grades. Regret was expressed at the departure of Mr. D. Wilkie. By postal ballot from the clubs the following committee was elected: executive committee: Messrs. E. Chapman, C. Howe, I. Stonex, C. Hopkinson, M.E. McNamara, T. Carey, T. McIntosh and G. Batchelor. There was a tie for ninth which required the names of three candidates to be resubmitted. Mr. J. Short was re-elected delegate of the Referees’ Association. At their meeting on 2 April the appointment of Mr. E. Chapman was confirmed, he was succeeding Mr. D. Wilkie. Mr. C. Howe was elected deputy, and Mr. Ivan Stonex was grounds allocator and assistant secretary. The ninth member elected after the further ballot was Mr. W. Berger.

=== Auckland Rugby League Primary School Management Committee ===
In October L Rout, secretary of the primary school boys committee was presented with a blazer, fountain pen, and pencil in recognition of his work for ten years. Chairman of the Auckland Rugby League, Campbell paid tribute to his work and said “the success of the boys competition was due to the secretary's administration.

=== Auckland Rugby League Referees Association ===
They held their annual meeting on 4 March with Mr. Les E. Bull presiding. The report presented said that “the 1939 season was successful, and the number of new members indicated the flourishing state of the association, the total active membership being 56”. The following officers were elected:- President, Mr. Les Bull; vice-president, Mr. J. McCowatt; senior delegate, Mr. William Mincham; junior, Mr. J. Short; schoolboys, Mr. G. Kelly; New Zealand Association, Mr. Les Bull; secretary, Mr. T.E. Skinner; treasurer, Mr. A. Chapman; critic, Mr. A. Sanders; appointment board appointee, Mr. Percy Rogers; examination committee, Messrs. M. Renton and A Brady; executive, Messrs. Stuart Billman, Maurice Wetherill, and Roy Otto. At their meeting on 9 April it was decided to instruct “referees to fully penalise late tackling”... “which was unnecessarily the cause of too much injury”. At the same meeting the resignations of Messrs. A.G. Campney and R.L. Marrick “were received with regret”. On 22 April “the resignation of Mr. A. Kinnaird was received with regret”.

=== Avondale League Football Club ===
R. Dormer of the Avondale club won a gold medal presented by Mr. J. F. W. Dickson at the final control board meeting of the year on 23 October for being the best conducted junior player.

=== City Rovers Football Club ===
They began their senior and senior reserve grade practices on the night of 26 March at Carlaw Park. On 1 September they held a special meeting to discuss their proposed trip to Stratford on 7 September. Their annual picnic was held at Redwood Park in Swanson on 3 November. At the picnic a presentation of a clock was made to Ernie Asher for his 31 years of service to the club.

=== Ellerslie United League Football Club ===
In April Ellerslie protested against the City Rovers club in playing Warwick Clarke against Manukau in round 1 of the championship without obtaining permission from Ellerslie. Chairman Campbell said that City had applied just prior to the game starting and it was granted pending confirmation at the first meeting following the match. On 1 May the Ellerslie club sent a deputation to the control board meeting asking for support “in the matter of contribution to the borough's effort to raise funds for the erection of an ambulance room on” the ground they used. “Mr. J. McInnarney appealed for the staging of a senior match at Ellerslie later in the season. The chairman after discussion with the board recognised the work of the St John Ambulance Association and it was agreed to arrange a fixture”.

=== Glenora Rugby League Football Club ===
Glenora fielded a team in the 4th grade, along with a side in the intermediate primary schools and junior primary schools competitions.

=== Manukau Rugby League Club ===
On 9 April at the ARL junior management meeting the Manukau club notified the league that their junior delegate was Mr. L.G. Healey. On 22 May the control board granted the Manukau club permission to stage their match with Papakura at Waikaraka Park in aid of the Onehunga Patriotic Committee. Towards the end of the season Tapihana Paraire Paikea played a few matches for the Manukau senior side. In 1943 he succeeded his father who had died, as the winner of the Northern Maori electorate.

=== Marist Brothers Old Boys League Football Club ===
At their annual meeting in March, they stood in silence to remember Mr. J. McSweeney and Jim Rukutai, who had both died recently. Their annual report congratulated the senior team on winning the Roope Rooster. Officers were elected as follows:- Patron, His Lordship Bishop Liston; president, Mr. Joe Sayegh; vice presidents, all were re-elected, with power to add; secretary, Mr. Jack Kirwan; treasurer, Mr. P. Fletcher; club captain, Mr. F. Webberley; school board, Mr. E.J. Foster; auditors, Messrs. R. Haslam, J. Ball, P. Hughes, W. Maddigan, J. Delihoyde; masseurs, Messrs. J. Duffy, and G. Allen.

=== Mt. Albert United Rugby League Football Club ===
At their annual meeting the following officers were elected:- Patron, Mr. Henry Albert Anderson, Mayor of Mount Albert; vice patron, Mr. Arthur Shapton Richards, M.P.; president, Mr. B Brigham; chairman, Mr. R.J. Wilson; secretary and treasurer, Mr. H.G. Shaw; club captain, Mr. L. Pearson; honorary auditor, Mr. S.C. Johnson.

=== Newton Rangers League Football Club ===
Their annual meeting was held in late March at the Auckland RL's board room. Officers were elected as follows:- Patron, Mr. M.J. Hooper; vice patron, Mr. Alan Blakey; president, the Hon. W.E. Parry; club captain, Mr. J. McKinnon; secretary, Mr. J. Gibson; chairman, Mr. G. Steven; committee, Messrs. R. Bell, E. Cowley, J. Davison, I. Railey, R. Anderson, and J.A. Neitch.

=== North Shore Albions ===
Allan Seagar coached the senior team.

=== Northcote and Birkenhead Ramblers Football Club ===
At the Northcote Borough Council meeting on 26 March an application was received by the league club to use Stafford Park. The council gave permission for the use of the ground from 27 April with the conditions the same as the previous year. At the Northcote Borough Council meeting on 26 June the Northcote club “asked permission to take up a collection in aid of the funds of the Northcote Red Cross branch at a burlesque football match to be played on July 6” at Stafford Park, Northcote. The council granted permission.

=== Otahuhu Rugby League Football Club ===
On 22 April the Ōtāhuhu Borough Council met and “on the advice of the legal and finance committee it was resolved to charge the [Otahuhu] league football club 5/ per week during the season for the use of the playing ground in Hutton Street, plus £2 12/ per year for the use of the ground on which the training shed stands”. In the middle of the year the club sent a deputation to the Otahuhu Borough Council meeting complaining of being “charged for use of water for which they had not received an account for seven years”. A member of the council said that they statement should be withdrawn as the council had duplicates of the accounts which proved that the league club had in fact received annual accounts. The council said that they would reconsider the charge of £2 12/ per year for the use of the playing area. Following a meeting of the Otahuhu Borough Council in early July they invited any member of the rugby league club who was a ratepayer in the area to “peruse office documents regarding the letting of Sturges Park to the rugby union. In regard to the water account owing by the [Otahuhu league] club, which they allege went to the sister code, the town clerk stated that carbon copies inspected by the parks committee prove that with one exception accounts were addressed correctly”. The council also decided that as the league club was unable to provide lighting at the ground it was using they would not make any charge when the ground was not in use.

=== Papakura Rugby League Football Club ===
On 1 April at the Papakura Borough Council meeting they granted the use of Prince Edward Park to the Papakura Rugby League Club for the season at a rental of £10. The club held their end of year presentations in late October. Mr. Les McVeigh was presiding and presentations were made to three officials. They were Mr. Ron Walsh who was secretary and had recently been appointed to a position in Thames, Mr. R.C. Williams who was being transferred to Whangārei, and Mr. Gordon Wilson who was retiring from the executive position he had held at the club since its inception for business reasons. Each man was presented with an inscribed wristlet watch. Walsh and Williams had “been in office since 1936”.

=== Richmond Rovers Football Club ===
They held their annual meeting in late March with Mr. B.W. Davis presiding. The success of various teams who had won trophies in 1939 was noted. The following officers were elected:- Patron, Mr. J.A. Redwood, sen.; president, Mr. B.W. Davis; secretary and treasurer, Mr. W.R. Dick; club captain, Mr. R. Hyland; schoolboys’ delegate, Mr. E.J. McCarthy; auditor, Mr. J.A. Redwood.

== Transfers and registrations ==
On 10 April an unnamed club sought to register J.A. Flower (Kogorah, New South Wales). He had “signed up with an Auckland club [Ponsonby] in June last year, but had not played”. Another club had inquired as to whether or not it could sign him but the board said that according to the rules he would have to be granted a clearance from Ponsonby or else stand down until June. Eventually in July his transfer was approved by the New South Wales Rugby League. The following applications for senior membership were approved:- W. Mataira, E. Estall, P.A. McGurr, L.C. Stevens (City), H.M. Richards, N.C. Bacon (Newton), R. Findlater (City), L.F. Hart (Newton). On 17 April the following transfers were approved:- R.J. Douglas (Manukau to Newton), J.B. Bakalich (Marist to Ponsonby), and E.J. Bovaird (Papakura to Mount Albert). These players were registered:- J.L. Littlewood, J.D. Richardson, L.R. Nepia, F. Swanberg (Ponsonby), L.J. Trumper (Newton), G. Graham (North Shore), J. Hunt (Mount Albert), J. F. Keates (City). On 25 April the following registrations were approved:- P.H. Kelly, E. Eaton, T.E. Appleton (Ponsonby), P. Rei, J. Belmont, E. Tetai (Ponsonby), D. Morris (Newton), J. McArthur, N. Beagley (North Shore), A.C. Miller (Richmond), A. Watkins (City), E.L. Gower, D. Holden, J. Nolan, J. Walters, C. Ahern, J. Quirke (Marist). While the following transfers were granted:- D. Munro (Green Lane to City), G. Brady (Otahuhu to Mount Albert), and H. Johnstone and R. Martin (both Otahuhu to Manukau).

On 1 May the following players were regraded:- T.H. Burgess (Papakura seniors to Otahuhu thirds), R.T. Taylor (Newton seniors to Otahuhu senior B), and A. Legge (City to senior B, and then to third grade subject to approval by the junior board). Clearance were granted for J. O’Brien (North Shore to Western Suburbs, Sydney), A.B. Nathan (Newton Rangers to Central, Wellington). The following players were granted transfers:- G. Crocker, Papakura to Marist Old Boys, D. Brady (Otahuhu senior B to Mount Albert), S.W. Clarke (Ellerslie senior B to City reserves), J McArthur (Ellerslie senior B to North Shore). W. Burgoyne (City), and J. Philpott (Point Chevalier) were reinstated. On 29 May C.C Peterson was granted a transfer from Ponsonby to North Shore, James Thomas Silva from Green Lane senior B to Newton, and Francis Zimmerman from R.V. senior B to Newton. H.M. Moir, A. Laird (Hobsonville), and Oliver Norman Gee (Ponsonby) were registered.

On 12 June J. Sullivan was registered with Ponsonby with a clearance from City, while Walter Ronald Ward was also registered with Ponsonby after a clearance from Richmond. L Rossington was also granted a clearance from New South Wales to join Ponsonby. On 19 June Andrew I. Jost was registered with Newton and John Frederick Rayner with North Shore. J. Greenwood transferred from Richmond reserves to North Shore seniors. Frank Pickrang (Ponsonby) and Peter Mahima (Manukau) were granted conditional transfers to play in Wellington as they were at the Trentham Army Camp. The application was made by the Central club.

On 24 July the league received a letter from the New South Wales rugby league agreeing to the transfer of J. A. Flower from St George (Sydney) to Auckland. J.M. Cornish had his application for reinstatement approved.

On 2 October G.W. Moyles and R.C. Deverall were transferred from South Auckland to the Manukau club with both being eligible to play in the Phelan Shield the following weekend.
