= Newmarket Rugby League Club =

Defunct NZ rugby league club, based in Auckland

Club information
- Full name: Newmarket Rugby League Club
- Short name: Newmarket
- Founded: 1928
- Exited: 1941

Former details
- Competition: Auckland Rugby League

Records
- Premierships: 1928 Primary Schools, 1929 Primary Schools, 1931 Sixth Grade

The Newmarket Rugby League Club was a rugby league club in Auckland, New Zealand which existed from 1928 to 1931. They then went into a hiatus until reforming in 1939 before once again ceasing to exist at the end of the 1941 season. They competed in the Auckland Rugby League lower grade competitions. The club was made up of players from the Newmarket area of central Auckland.

== History ==
=== 1928 Formation ===
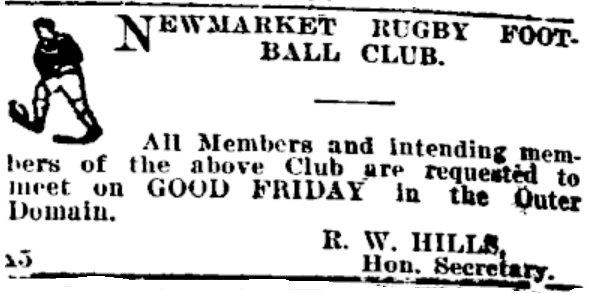
The first advertisement for the club.

The Newmarket club formed in early 1928. An advertisement was placed in the Auckland Star newspaper for the “Newmarket Rugby Football Club” but at this time there was no Newmarket rugby club and the honorary secretary posting the notice was R.W. Hills who was to be the Newmarket Rugby League Club’s honorary secretary that season. The notice said “all members and intending members of the above club are requested to meet on Good Friday in the Outer Domain”. Then on April 27 a notice appeared for the “Newmarket Rugby League Football Club” stating “Practice Matches for All Grades of the above club will be held TO-MORROW (Saturday), at 2p.m. All Players and Intending Players are requested to meet opp. The Captain Cook Hotel, Khyber Pass Rd., Newmarket”. The Captain Cook Hotel was located at the site of the Lion Brewery which was a well known feature of the Newmarket area for many decades. At the April 12 Auckland Rugby League management committee meeting an application was received by the Newmarket club to enter a 6th Grade team. There was reportedly “fear”, that “the new club might rob Parnell of good players. Parnell was the suburb immediately adjacent to Newmarket and both clubs were essentially based at the Auckland Domain. Despite the concerns the committee decided to accept the nomination.

Ultimately Newmarket entered sides in the 3rd Intermediate, 6th A Grade, 6th B Grade, and the Schools grade. The 3rd Intermediate team finished third playing 15 games, winning 7, drawing 2, losing 4, with 2 results unknown, scoring 143 points, and conceding 88. The first games the club played were on May 5. The 3rd Intermediate team played against Point Chevalier at Mount Albert at 2pm with Vic Simpson the referee. They lost 8-0. The 6th A team lost to Point Chevalier at Walker Park, while the 6th B team lost to Newton Rangers 6-0 on the Outer Domain. The club had their first win the following weekend on May 12 when the 3rd Intermediate side beat Newton at Mount Albert at 2pm. The 6th A Grade team drew with Akarana 0-0. They finished the season in 4th out of 9 sides with a 15 played, 6 wins, 2 draws, 4 loss record with 3 results unknown. The 6th B team lost to Akarana 14-0. They were winless through the season losing all of their 14 matches and only scoring 3 points while conceding 284.

The Newmarket Primary Schools team played its first game on June 2 against Papatoetoe Primary School at the Auckland Domain at 1pm with Mr. A. Sanders refereeing. In their inaugural season the Newmarket side won the championship winning 10 of their 11 games and only suffering the one defeat. They scored 169 points and conceded just 10. They lost the knockout semi final on October 20 by 12 points to 10 against a team representing Otahuhu schools. On July 28 the Auckland Rugby League held a primary school’s trial to select an Auckland representative side. The match was a curtain-raiser to the North Island v South Island match at Carlaw Park. In the A Team from the Newmarket side was J. Smith at fullback, and Hick and Green in the forwards. The B Team featured Anderson at halfback, and Carey in the forwards. The B Team won 5 points to 3. Then a Possibles v Probables trial was played for the Auckland schoolboys on August 4 at Carlaw Park. The match was a curtain-raiser to the New Zealand v England test match. Several Newmarket schoolboys were named to play including in the Probables side, Smith at fullback, Anderson at halfback, and Hick, and Crowhurst in the forwards while Green was named in the reserves. In the Possibles side were Edlain in the backs, and Carey in the forwards. The game featured several players who would to on to be prominent senior players such as Eugene and Phil Donovan, Bill Glover, Freddie Maguire, and Gordon Midgley who would play for New Zealand. The Possibles side won 16 to 0. The Auckland Schoolboys representative side to play the Waikato Schoolboy side on August 11 included Anderson at halfback, and Hick and Green in the forwards with Carey in the reserves.

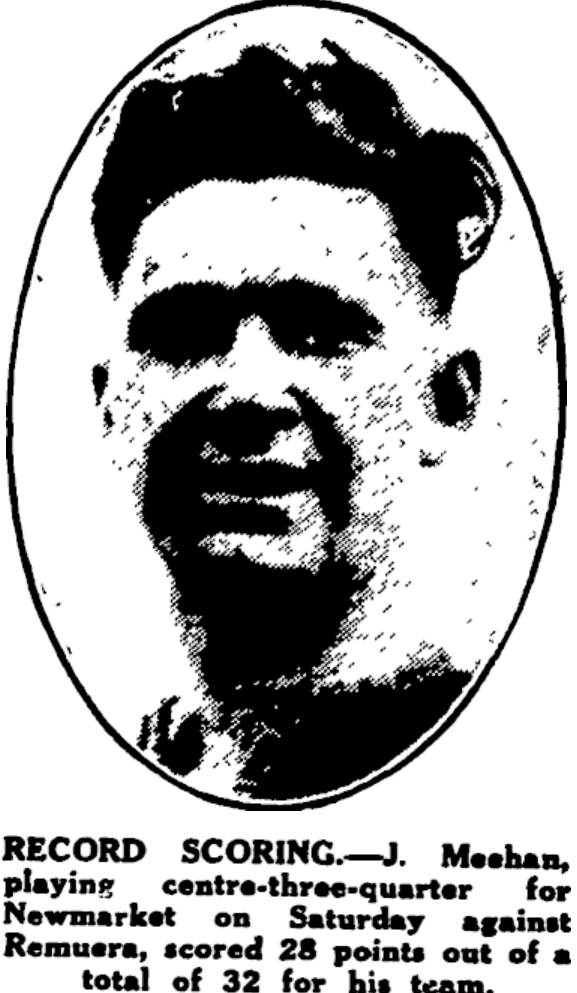
Pat Meehan, centre three-quarter, who scored 28 of their 32 points in their third grade win

Near the end of the season the feat of Pat Meehan in the Newmarket 3rd Grade side in a 31-0 win over Newton Rangers were written about in the New Zealand Herald. They said “a particularly good record for a junior was made at Carlaw Park on Saturday, when P. Meehan, playing for the Newmarket third grade team, scored eight tries and kicked two goals, 23 points out of the 31 gained by his team”. On September 29 one of the 3rd grade sides players, T. Coapham broke his collarbone in their 15-10 loss to Richmond Rovers in the knockout final. It was reported that he lived in Remuera and had to be taken to Auckland Hospital.

=== 1929, 3rd Intermediate, 5th, 6th, and Schoolboys ===
On February 27 a notice appeared in the New Zealand Herald for the Newmarket Rugby League Football Club’s annual meeting. It was to be held on February 28 at No. 8 Melrose Street with “all members are requested to attend” by honorary secretary R.W. Hills. They posted a notice for practices for all of their teams in mid April at the Auckland Domain.

The club was entering teams in the 3rd Intermediate Grade, 5th Grade, 6th A Grade, and Schoolboys. The first round of games were played on May 4. The 3rd grade Intermediate’s first match was against Mount Albert at Mount Albert at 3pm. Newmarket won the match 28 to 0. The team list was published in the Auckland Star and included: J. Stewart, N. Funnell, R. Donkin, Clarke (2), Hunt (2), McIlroy (2), A. Clough, B. Frieny, Blundell, Beeston, Ford, R. McConnell, Daniels, Milligan, and Robson. They would go on to finish 3rd out of 8 teams with an 8 win, 5 loss record, scoring 112 points and conceding 41. They won the knockout competition when they beat Devonport United 7-6 on September 28. It was reported at this stage of the year that Ponsonby had secured the services of Pat Meehan for their senior squad. It was said that he “is a promising young player, who may have to miss the first few matches because of a recent spell in hospital. A junior, who was outstanding when he played for Newmarket”. The knockout final victory was covered by The Sun newspaper on September 30. They wrote “the Newmarket third intermediate graders scored and exciting last minute victory by 7 points to 6 when they met Shore in the final of the knock-out competition at Carlaw Park on Saturday… In the early stages the game lacked excitement, both sides spoiling the play by too much kicking. Newmarket went to the a slight attack and from a good position [Pat] Meehan managed a fine penalty goal. In the second half “play was again loose and uninteresting… weak offside play by a Shore player gave Meehan another shot at goal. He was successful and the half time score was Newmarket 4, Devonport 2. Then a few minutes before the end of the game “Newmarket produced a back movement which could be described as brilliant. With his side holding a good attacking position, halfback A. Clough snapped the ball up from a scrum and send out to Meehan, to Hunt, and on to Buchanan on the wing, who raced over in the corner for a fine try, which was not converted”.

For the June 8 games all of the Newmarket team lists were published in the newspapers. The 3rd Intermediate side was the same as a month earlier with the addition of a player named C. Leek in the backs. They lost 6-5 at the Devonport Domain “after a hard game”. The Sun newspaper said however that “the game was marred by too much talking on the field, and the Newmarket Leaguers were the chief offenders”.

The 5th Grade team to play City Rovers was Riley, Wilson, Sarney, McLennan, Allen, Banks, Geal, Dearson, Appleton, Aukett, Ford, Weaver, O’Shaughnessey, Wheelhouse, Sheehan, and Leek. They won 8 points to 0. They finished the year runners-up in the championship behind Richmond with a 9 win, 1 draw, 4 loss record, scoring 147 points and conceding 64.

Their 6th Grade A team to play Northcote & Birkenhead Ramblers was Sercomb, Young, Carr, Green, Elliott, Rhodes, Smith, Tonkinson, Brown, Allen, Gore, Casey, Bishop, Crowhurst, and Smith. They lost 21 to 0 at Northcote and despite 15 players being named in their squad only 10 of them made the trip leaving them three short. The Sun wrote “Newmarket sixth grade A journeyed to Northcote and was beaten by 21 points to 0. The game was very even until the last quarter, when Newmarket lost Carey, who received injuries. In fact , up until this, Newmarket had only 10 men, and when it lost Carey, Shore began to pile on the points. It indeed says very little for those members of the Newmarket team who failed to turn up. With a full team, Newmarket would have been almost certain of a victory”. They finished the year second to last in a 10 team competition registering just one win and losing 12 games, scoring just five points and conceding 141.

Their schoolboys side to play Mount Alberts schoolboys side was McGregor, Jack, Franks, Murray, Emslie, Randell, Lund, Conway, Whitehead, Watts, Pattison, Wheelhouse, Baird, Traynor, McIvor, and Compton. Newmarket won 8 to 5 at Mount Albert at 2pm. The Sun newspaper wrote about several of the Newmarket teams the following week. Of the schoolboys side they wrote “The Newmarket schoolboys’ team travelled to Mount Albert, and after a good even game was successful in clinching a victory by 8 points to 5. Both the Newmarket and Mount Albert boys are showing a marked improvement in their play”. The schoolboys side once again won the championship after doing so in their inaugural season. They won 14 games and only lost once to easily win from second placed Newton Primary School. They also won the knockout tournament 25-5 when they beat Mangere Primary School on October 12. Then at the end of the season they also competed in a 7 team knockout tournament and won it, beating Mangere Primary School 6-0 in the final to complete a remarkable season. In the championship they scored 272 points and conceded only 21.

It was reported on July 2 that the Newmarket club had donated 2£ and 2 shillings to the Newmarket List which had been opened by the Mayor of Newmarket Mr. S. Donaldson. For the July 20 games the Newmarket 3rd Grade side featured Pat Meehan who had transferred back to the club after only playing one game for the Ponsonby seniors. It was said that he had “been on the sick list this season, and has not been seen in action except on one occasion when his side was short of players”.

On August 26 an Auckland Schoolboy Trial was played between A and B teams at Carlaw Park. From the Newmarket side Trainer was on the wing for the A Team, while L. Jack and Lunn were in the forwards. In the B Team were Smith in the five eighths, and Whitefield in the forwards, with Watts in the reserves. The match was to help select the Auckland representative side to travel to Northland to play 2 games at Whangarei on September 5 and Hikurangi on September 6. The Auckland team beat North Auckland 17 to 2 at Kensington Park in Whangarei, and then a day later beat Hikurangi 6 points to 4. They were captained by J. Smith of the Newmarket side who was in the five eighths. Other Newmarket players in the team were M. Whitefield and Lindsay Jack in the forwards. L. Edkins was in the back reserves. Interestingly the side featured Verdun Scott at fullback from the Devonport club. He would go on to be the only person to represent New Zealand in cricket and rugby league. The squad also had Freddie McGuire and Ray Halsey who would be prominent senior players in the late 1930s and early 1940s. J. Smith was one of those who “showed out” and he also scored a try, while Lindsay Jack also scored a try. In the 6-4 win J. Smith had to retire with an injury with C. Lund going close to scoring for Auckland before they eventually crossed to win.

The Newmarket Primary School side to play the Mangere Primary School son October 12 at Carlaw Park was named in the Auckland Star. They included N. McGregor, L. Jack, T. Baird, J. Smith. T. Murray, R. Pattison, B. White, L. Emslie, C. Lund, L. Edkins, G. Wheelhouse, G. Watts, N. Randall, H. Franklin, and H. Compton. They won 25-5 to complete the championship and knockout competition. For Newmarket, Smith scored a remarkable six tries with Patterson scoring one. McGregor and Edkins each kicked a goal. On November 2 Auckland Rugby League held their “schools day” at Carlaw Park. In the first round of games Newmarket beat Onehunga Convent 16 to 0, in the second round they won 18 to 0 over Otahuhu, and then in the final they beat Mangere 6 to 0 for an aggregate 40-0 scoreline on the day. There were also running races held on the day with Baird placing third in the 100 yards midget championship. In the 100 Yards Relay Race Newmarket placed third with Smith, Murray, Baird, and Wheelhouse competing.

=== 1930 4 teams ===
In 1930 Newmarket fielded four teams once more. They were in the 3rd Intermediate, 5th, 6th, and Schoolboys grades once more. They held their annual general meeting in early April. It was adjourned and the meeting was continued at the Orient Tea Rooms, Broadway, on Thursday April 10 at 8pm. Their honorary secretary was R.R. Wills once more. On Wednesday, May 14 the club held a dance at the Municipal Hall in Newmarket. It stated they “will hold a popular dance. Select Orchestra 8 to 11.30, Monte Carlo, Balloons, Chocolates, Cigarettes. Gents 2/, Ladies 1/6, - Pat Meehan, M.C”.

The opening round games were played on May 3. The 3rd Intermediate team played Kingsland Athletic and lost 8 to 3 on the Outer Domain at 2.30pm. They finished the season in second place to Kingsland with a 10 win, 2 loss record, scoring 155 and conceding 48. Their 5th Grade team beat Akarana 5 to 3 in their opening game at Walker Park in Point Chevalier at 1.45pm. They ultimately came 6th of 8 winning 4 of their 14 games, losing 9 and drawing 1, scoring 90 and conceding 123. The 6th Grade team lost their first game of the season to Point Chevalier 22-2 at Walker Park. They finished in 6th place out of 11 teams, winning 6, drawing 1, losing 12 and having 2 scores unreported. Whilst the schoolboys team finished 3rd in the A Section. The competition was not well reported in the newspapers and they only had 8 results reported, winning seven and losing one, scoring 172 and conceding just 16.

The Schoolboys side for their May 17 game against Northcote & Birkenhead Ramblers was published in the New Zealand Herald. It was R Pattison, H. Franklin, G. Stanaway, B. White, R. Buchanan, R. Clough, E. Malone, A. Tate, M. Lund, T. Murray, L. Johnson, B. Watkin, M. Bennett, C. Compton, T. Baird, R. Clark, H. Boyce, and L. Riley. They beat Northcote 20 points to 0 at the Auckland Domain No. 2 field at 1pm.

The team held several dances during the year. The first known was the one on May 14. Another was held on May 28 at the Municipal Hall in Newmarket “Opposite Rialto Picture Theatre”. It was a Jazz feature with the promotion stating “thousands will be turned away on high bikes, Monte Carlo, Roulette, chocolates, streamers, balloons…”.

On June 20 the newspapers published the team lists for all four teams for the first time in the season. They were, Third Grade Intermediate: Pat Meehan, Donkin, Hunt (2), Clapham, Clark, Freeny, Ford, Daniels, Funnell, Johnstone, Stewart, A. Henderson, and McConnall; Fifth Grade: Appleton, Riley, McLennan, Benson, O’Shanassy, Carr, Watson, Weaver, Leek, Wilson, Hills, Auckett, Pearson, Sercombe, McKenzie, Sarney, and Doidge; Sixth Grade: Smith (3), Stanaway, Cook, Vail, Dingle, Allison, Edkins, Davies, Murphy, and Rhodes; Schoolboys: Pattison, Franklin, Stanaway, White, Buchanan, Clough, Malone, Tate, Lund, Murray, Johnson (2), Watkin, Boyce, Baird, Bennett, Compton, Clark, Riley and Dean. Newmarket won the 3rd Grade Intermediate knockout competition when they beat Akarana 8 to 2 on September 13.

In late September Mr. E. Cowley named 4 teams to play at Carlaw Park in a trial. The A Team included Stanaway in the forwards and the B Team Patterson and Bennett in the backs. While in the Possibles side E. and L. Moore were in the backs and Franklin in their reserves, and in the Probables Dean was in the front row. On October 4 against Newton the 6th Grade side was well beaten by Newton. However the Auckland Star wrote that “a sparkling game amongst the juniors at Carlaw Park [was played] between Newton and Newmarket”. Newton won 25-0. “It was a fine, open and fast league play, the backs showing fine collaboration and passing with accuracy in spite of the adverse conditions”. The Auckland Rugby League decided to play some fixtures at Papakura on October 11 with a primary schools trial game featuring Newmarket players and a Newmarket junior side playing. In the primary schools game were Patterson, Stanaway, Bennett and Franklin. The Newmarket side was said to be their 3rd Grade side who were playing Richmond at Papakura at 3pm with Mr. A.E. Smith refereeing. The games were the first ever rugby league games played in Papakura and took place on the Railway Reserve. Two bus loads of players arrived from the city and Mr. L. Binns and W. Doble from New Zealand Rugby League and Mr. William Mincham and J.S. Adamson of the Auckland Rugby League were in attendance. The primary school game saw the A team beat the B team 14 to 2. The other match was reported to have been between the Richmond and Newmarket second grade teams. As Newmarket did not have a second grade team it was most likely a composite side featuring Newmarket third grade intermediate players and other players from within the club and outside the club. The Auckland Star wrote “a spectacular struggle was provided… and some very fine forward and back movement created enthusiasm. Newmarket, with a score by Hurley and two goals by Mincham, held a lead of 7-6 at the interval, the maroons having to their credit tries by Stehr and Estell. After the spell Richmond backs rose to the occasion, and in reply to tries by S. Dunn (2) and Estell, Funnell scored for Newmarket. Richmond won the game 20 to 10. It is highly likely that the Mincham who score a try for Newmarket was in fact the Richmond player Ted Mincham with the sides mixed up. He had just debuted for the Richmond senior side the same season and went on to play for New Zealand and his father, William, was one of the officials at the game. Another player who scored for Newmarket (Funnell) was likely Frank Funnell who was also in fact a Richmond player. On March 21 in 1931 it was reported that a rugby league club had been formed in the Papakura area. The club was the Papakura club which still exists to today and plays at the Prince Edward Park.

=== 1931 (4 teams) ===
In 1931 Newmarket had four teams again. They were contesting the 4th Grade, 6th Grade, 7th Grade, and Schoolboys Grade. On April 18 they held a practice on the Auckland Domain. In late April it was reported that a lot of work had gone into improving the Newmarket schools grounds using funds from the Unemployment Board’s No. 5 scheme. And that the Newmarket Rugby League club had contributed £5 towards the work which would be the equivalent of about $700 in 2026.

The opening games took place on May 2. The 4th Grade side was in the B Section and drew with Pt Chevalier 5-5 on the number 3 field at Walker Park. The 6th Grade side beat Newton 25-0 at the Domain number 2 field, while the 7th Grade side had their first game the following weekend and lost by default. They managed to field a side a week later and lost to Richmond A 7 to 3. They finished the season in the lower half of the standings. They played 15 games but only had 10 results reported which were two wins, a draw, and seven losses. After the first round it was reported that R. Currie, A. Williamson, and A. Henderson were transferring from Newmarket to City Rovers. Henderson had been in the 3rd Grade side the previous season. Also Pat Meehan of the same team also transferred to Marist Old Boys senior reserves. He would go on to play 19 games for their senior side over the next three seasons scoring 23 tries and kicking 9 goals.

The 4th Grade side played 20 games but only had 14 scores reported. They were 6 wins, 4 draws, and 4 losses. Going by other results it is likely that they finished in the top 4 of a 13 team competition. In mid September the Auckland Star wrote that they were third equal with Akarana, two points behind Richmond and eight points behind Marist.

The 6th Grade side won the championship for the first time when they defeated Richmond in the final on September 26 at Carlaw Park. The match was a curtain-raiser to the Auckland v Northland game and played on the number 2 ground. The 6th grade side played 18 games and won 16 of them scoring 165 points and only conceding 13. Richmond was two competition points behind them going into the last round when Newmarket had no game. Richmond beat City to force a playoff which Newmarket duly won. Their final was at 1.45pm and was refereed by Mr. S. Fisher. After their match their 4th Grade side played Marist on the same ground and drew 8-8.

The Newmarket schoolboy side played 17 games with six wins, and a loss, with nine results not reported. In early September the Auckland Primary Schools representative side was chosen to travel to Ngaruawahia to play an exhibition game. The Newmarket side provided six players, they were G. Stanaway, Bennett, Moore, Franklin, Johnston, and Filmer. The team included Arthur McInnarney of the Ellerslie schools side. He would go on to represent New Zealand and the team was managed by his father John McInnarney. On October 10 the Eastern Suburbs club from Sydney played a match with Devonport United. The Auckland Primary Schools played a representative match between City and Suburban teams. Bizarrely the sides featured players from the same clubs. In the City side was Johnston, Bennett, Filmer, and Moore from Newmarket. While G. Stanaway of Newmarket played in the Suburban side. The match was played on the number 1 field at 12:30 with the City side winning 20 points to 9 over Suburbs. The same afternoon the Newmarket 6th Grade side played their knockout game against Marist at Mount Albert and won while their 4th Grade side was also playing at Carlaw Park. They played Northcote & Birkenhead Ramblers on the number 2 field at 3:15 and lost 5-0.

=== 1932 Hiatus ===
The Newmarket club ceased to function in 1932. There was no reason given and it is somewhat surprising given they had four teams the previous season and had won the sixth grade competition and provided a large number of primary school representatives. There were several clubs in the nearby area and it is possible that many of the players moved to other clubs. On April 20 the Franklin Times newspaper reported that “several players from Newmarket were present” at one of their practices and would be “a decided acquisition to Papakura. The club would of course be revived in 1939.

=== 1939 Revival (4 Teams) ===
On February 6 the Newmarket club held a general meeting to try and reform the club after an eight year hiatus. Auckland Rugby League granted them affiliation following the meeting as a junior club with the following officers elected: Patron, the Newmarket Mayor, Mr. Samuel Donaldson (1921-1944); vice patron, Mr. E.P. Liddell; president, Mr. R.E. Newport; honorary secretary, Mr. B.R. Arnott. Delegates: to the junior management, Mr. C.E. Moore; to the primary schools’ management, Mr. O’Connor; honorary treasured, Mr. Skam; auditor, Mr. H. Wilson. It was pointed out that “there was every possibility of three teams taking part in competitions”. On the 1st of August the club notified the league that Mr. C.J. Clarke had been appointed it’s delegate in place of C.E. Moore.

They had teams in the 3rd Grade initially, and 5th Grade, Schoolboys Intermediate Grade, and Schoolboys Junior Grades. However the 3rd Grade side struggled so badly that after 4 games they moved the team to the 4th Grade. Their first game was against Otahuhu on May 6 and they suffered a 58-0 defeat at Otahuhu. They then lost to Manukau 14-0, Mt Albert 61-4, and Marist Old Boys 56-0. They were then moved to the 4th grade competition. They had to weigh in before this was able to occur. Whilst they didn’t lose as badly they still failed to win any games and finished the season losing nine more games and only scoring 11 points whilst conceding 126 from the games reported.

The Newmarket 5th Grade side had a good season winning nine games out of the 12 with scores reported, finishing second of nine. They scored 169 points and only conceded 42. On June 3 they lost to Papakura 6-0 but were awarded the win after Papakura had fielded players ‘out of order’. On the 27th of June L. McMahon was regraded from their 3rd Grade side to their 5th Grade side. On June 13 D.W. Neithe transferred to the club from Marist Old Boys.

The Newmarket Intermediate Grade team played in the B Section of the competition and played 14 games. Only seven results were reported with five wins and two losses. They scored 92 points and conceded 25 in those games. In October the Auckland Schoolboy representative sides were selected with McCready making the Intermediate representative side. The Newmarket Junior Shoolboys team also had a good season winning six of the eight results reported. They also had a draw and a loss, scoring 80 points and conceding 25 and most likely finished second of seven teams. At the conclusion of the season the Auckland Rugby League held their annual schoolboy carnival. In the relay races Newmarket schoolboys finished second behind Green Lane.

=== 1940 (4 Teams) ===
In 1940 Auckland Rugby League season Newmarket fielded four teams once more. They were in the 4th Grade, 5th Grade, and Schoolboy Senior and Junior Grades. There was very little reporting of the games and scores due to the war dominating much of the media at this time. An advertisement appeared in the March 26 Auckland Star for the Newmarket club’s annual meeting which was held on the same evening (Tuesday). It was held at the newmarket Borough Council Chambers with “players and supporters cordially invited by honorary secretary B.R. Arnott.

Their 4th Grade side struggled and dropped out of the competition following defeats to Avondale, City Rovers, and Pt Chevalier. They had a 10-0 win over Glenora who had also lost all of their previous games. After a scheduled June 8 game against North Shore at the Devonport Domain they had no further results reported. The 5th Grade team had a mixed start to the season, beating Northcote 52-0 before two unreported results and then a 15-8 loss to Richmond, an 8-3 win over Manukau, and a 10-2 loss to Otahuhu Rovers. They then had no scheduled fixtures from June 15 to June 29 before playing Northcote again. This time they won 22-11 and the following week they lost to Mt Albert United club 10-0. Similar to the 4th Grade side they had no more results reported. It was reported that 20 year old Robert Newby was concussed playing for the club at Walker Park in Pt Chevalier on May 18 however the newspaper stated he was playing for their 3rd Grade side which did not exist. Then on July 13 another Newmarket player broke his arm playing for Newmarket. He was aged 17 and most likely playing in the 5th Grade side which lost 10-0 to Mt Albert.

The schoolboys fielded teams in the Senior (Lou Rout Trophy) competition and the Junior competition. The Senior side only had four fixtures reported and only one result reported, a 17-3 loss to Ellerslie United on May 25. The Junior side had six fixtures reported with only two results known, a 3-2 loss to Green Lane on May 25, and a 9-0 win over North Shore on August 3. On Saturday afternoon, October 26 Auckland Rugby League held a sports meeting at Carlaw Park. In the junior relay the Newmarket team won ahead of Marist.

=== 1941 (Schoolboys) ===
In 1941 Newmarket only fielded teams in the schoolboys competitions. They had teams in each of the Senior, Intermediate, and Junior grades. The newspapers had ceased to publish fixtures and results of most grades below senior level so it is unknown how the sides fared. The annual meeting was on Wednesday, April 9 at the Municipal Buildings in Newmarket with “intending players and supporters cordially invited” by B.R. Arnott who was the honorary secretary once more.

Very few results were reported during the year. On May 24 the Junior side drew with Marist A 0-0. On June 14 Newmarket’s intermediate team lost to Newton Rangers 19-0 while their junior team drew with Newmarket 0-0. A week later on June 21 the intermediate team drew with Green Lane 3-3. On July 19 the senior schoolboys side was reported to have defaulted to Pt Chevalier. The last reported result of the season for Newmarket was from the 16th of August when the junior side drew with North Shore 3-3.

At the end of the season Auckland Rugby League held their annual schoolboy events with Newmarket winning the junior relay race once more. In the ‘tug of war’ they beat Glenora in the third heat but did not make the final.

The club then ceased to exist at the end of the season.

=== Team Records ===
==== Most Senior Team ====
The season record for the most senior team in the club.

Year	Grade	Club Name	Pld	W	D	L	PF	PA	PD	Pts	Position (Teams)
1928	3rd Grade Intermediate	Newmarket	15	7	2	4	143	88	+55	16	3rd of 9
1929	3rd Grade Open (Hayward Shield)	Newmarket	14	9	1	4	147	64	+83	19	2nd of 8
1930	3rd Grade Intermediate	Newmarket	12	10	0	2	155	48	+107	20	2nd of 7
1931	3rd Grade	Newmarket	20	6	4	4	84	61	+23	16	3rd of 16 (most results not reported)
1939	4th Grade	Newmarket	13	0	0	9	11	126	-125	0	11th of 13
1940	4th Grade	Newmarket	6	1	0	4	18	32	-14	2	10th of 11
1941	Schoolboys Seniors	Senior Grade - results unknown									
1928-31 & 1939-41	TOTAL	-	80	33	5	23	558	419	-137	73	
