= Gordon Midgley =

New Zealand international rugby league player

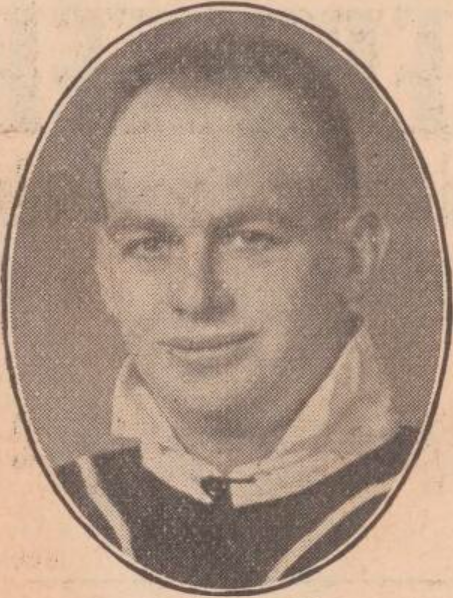
- Midgley in 1938

Personal information
- Full name: Gordon Taylor Midgley
- Born: 29 June 1915 Auckland, New Zealand
- Died: 25 August 1965 (aged 50) Auckland, New Zealand

Playing information
- Height: 180 cm (5 ft 11 in)
- Weight: 71 kg (11 st 2 lb)
- Position: Wing
Club
| Years | Team | Pld | T | G | FG | P |
|---|---|---|---|---|---|---|
| 1929–34 | Ellerslie (Juniors) |
| 1935 | Ponsonby (Reserves) |
| 1937–40 | Marist Old Boys (Saints) | 59 | 35 | 0 | 0 | 105 |
| | Total | 59 | 35 | 0 | 0 | 105 |
Representative
| Years | Team | Pld | T | G | FG | P |
| 1937 | Auckland Pākehā | 1 | 1 | 0 | 0 | 3 |
| 1937 | Auckland | 2 | 4 | 0 | 0 | 12 |
| 1938 | North Island | 1 | 1 | 0 | 0 | 3 |
| 1938 | New Zealand | 4 | 1 | 0 | 0 | 3 |

Gordon Taylor Midgley (29 June 1915 – 25 August 1965) was a rugby league player who represented New Zealand at rugby league in four matches on their 1938 tour of Australia, becoming the 263rd player to represent New Zealand. He also played two matches for Auckland, one for the North Island, and one for Auckland Pākehā. Midgley played his junior club rugby league for the Ellerslie club in Auckland before transferring to the Marist Old Boys (Saints) club where he made his senior debut (59 games). Midgley was also a very good middle distance runner in his late teens and early 20s.

== Early life ==
Gordon Midgley was born on 29 June 1915 in Auckland, New Zealand. His parents were Arthur Midgley (1886–1954) and Ethel May Taylor (1889–1973). He had a younger brother, Sidney Midgley who was born on 13 November 1921. The family lived in the Ellerslie area of Auckland.

== Junior rugby league and athletics competitions ==
In 1929 Gordon Midgley was playing for the Ellerslie United 6th grade rugby league team. The following year in 1930 he was again playing for the Ellerslie sixth grade team. There was an “A Midgley” on the Ellerslie committee which was likely his father, Arthur.

There was no mention of Midgley the following year in any rugby league teams, however at the end of 1932 he was registered as competing at the Ellerslie Amateur Athletic and Cycle Club's meeting on 24 November. The meeting was held at the Ellerslie Reserve where the rugby league club was based and still is. Midgley was competing in the 100 Yard race. In 1933 a "G Midgley" was reported to have been elected on to the Ellerslie United rugby league club’s committee, though he would only have been aged 18 at the time.

On 18 February 1933 Midgley competed at the Auckland Amateur Athletic Centre’s annual championships at the Auckland Domain. He was entered in the Junior races (under 18 years) and ran in the 100 Yard and 880 Yard events. It is not known if he placed in the races but two weeks later the New Zealand Herald wrote that “Harrison, winner of the 100 yds junior championship, and Midgley are two most promising young sprinters”. On 3 March he finished second in the Ellerslie Athletic Club’s open race. Midgley had also won the Auckland Amateur Junior 880 Yard championship race on 18 February at the Auckland Domain. In the 100 Yard race he came 3rd in his heat and then finished 3rd in the final. In the 880 Yard final he beat F.E. Watt and Alan Sayers who dead heated for second. Midgley’s winning time was 2m 7.25 sec. He also placed 2nd in the 440 Yard championship behind W.S. Bainbridge.

At the end of the year on 6 December he won the 220 Yard Open race at the Ellerslie Amateur Athletic Club’s race in a time of 22:25s. Midgley had a 14 yard start on Allan Elliot who “just failed to catch” him. Elliot was the Auckland Amateur Athletic 100 yard and 220 yard champion at the time and had equalled the New Zealand 100 Yard record. He had also competed at the 1930 British Empire Games and the 1932 Olympic Games. Then on 16 December Midgley travelled to Hamilton to compete with teams representing the Technical College Old Boys in an inter-club event. He came second in the 220 Yard race and second in the 440 Yard race. On 17 January 1934 he ran in the Manukau Amateur Cycling Club athletic events at Western Springs Stadium. Midgley won the 880 Yard Open race by 3 yards though with a 28 yard handicap in a time of 1m 59s. The Auckland Star later wrote that “the half-mile was won in 1.59 by Midgley off 28 yards. This is an excellent run, as Midgley seemed to have control of the race at the finish, and is certainly a dangerous handicap man”. In March several well known Australian athletes came to Auckland for a large meeting at the Auckland Domain. A crowd of 10,000 turned out. Gordon Midgley finished in 3rd place in the 220 Yard Open Handicap final behind W.G. Miller and C.G. Goosman. At the end of the season in a review the Auckland Star wrote that L.H. Johnson and Midgley are “potential Auckland provincial champions. They have age on their side”.

== Rugby league playing career and athletics ==
=== Ellerslie to Ponsonby rugby league ===
On 2 May 1934, Gordon Midgley transferred from Ellerslie to the Ponsonby United reserve grade side. He was named to play in their reserve grade side for their opening game on 28 April, with Eric Midgley at fullback. It is unclear if the two were related, with Eric being an excellent diver, regularly competing with Arthur Kay and Wilf Hassan, both New Zealand rugby league representatives. Occasionally Eric played in the senior side but Gordon remained in the reserves throughout the season. In June the Ellerslie club requested a transfer fee “in respect of S. Midgley, now playing with Ponsonby”. Presumably the first initial was a typo as when he had transferred in March his initials were recorded as “G.T. Midgley”. His younger brother Sidney would have only been 13 at the time and too young to have been the named player. Confusingly a month later a G. Midgley was granted a transfer from Ellerslie to Ponsonby third intermediates.

At the beginning of the 1934 Athletics season in October, Midgley competed in the Otahuhu club’s meeting at Sturgess Park in Ōtāhuhu. He won the 220 Yard senior race, and finished second in the 100 Yard and 440 Yard seniors races. He went on to compete in several of their meetings at the same venue and on 15 November he placed second by inches to Don Rae in the 100 Yard race first heat and then ran second in the final to Trevor Blockley. Later he won the 220 Yard senior race in 22 seconds. Around the same date he won the 100 Yard final at a Technical College Old Boys’ Amateur Athletic Club meeting at Blandford Park in Grafton Gully. A week later at a Thursday night meeting at Sturgess Park in Otahuhu, with one thousand spectators present Midgley faced off with Don Rae again in the heats. In the final Midgley came third by inches to C. Naden and Trevor Blockley. Later that month at an Auckland sports carnival at Alexandra Park in Epsom to raise money for Auckland Cricket, Midgley won the 220 yard race. He was competing for the Technical club and finished in a time of 23.25s. In early December Midgley won the 440 Yard race at Sturgess Park, and came second in the 100 Yard final after winning his heat in 10.25s. To win the 440 Yard event he was said to have won “a wonderful race, just beating A. Martin, who faltered at the finish”. Then a week before Christmas, Midgley was said to have given the “outstanding performance of the meeting” at Sturgess Park. He won the 120 and 220 yard senior races. He conceded up to 13 yards in the 220 yard race and won “right on the tape”. In the 120 yard race he had a one yard start “and when 80 yds had gone it looked almost impossible for him to get up with the leaders, but one of his electric finishes saw him cut down the opposition to score by inches. These successes should put Midgley well up in the points competition”. In comments on the meeting in the New Zealand Herald they said “G. Midgley was in splendid form and ran very fast to win the 120 yards and the 220 yards open handicaps. In the shorter race he registered 12 seconds from the one-yard mark, a time that can be regarded practically as evens. An ex-junior provincial half-mile champion, Midgley has now developed into a really first-class athlete”. In mid January Midgley won the 220 yard race once more at Otahuhu. He recorded a time of 23 seconds. Allan Elliot finished third after William T. Bainbridge was disqualified for running in front of him near the start. On 31 January at the same clubs meeting he “again proved his superiority over the half mile run, conceding four handicaps and winning brilliantly” in a time of 2m 2.25s.

On 2 March the Auckland provincial amateur athletic championships were arranged for the Auckland Domain. In prospects for the half mile running event it was said that “Kedgley is a brilliant” runner, “but A.R. Wilson and G. Midgley are possibilities”. The event had nominations from Auckland along with Dargaville, Whangārei, Rotorua, Thames, and Hamilton. In the senior events Midgley was entered for the 440 and 880 yard races. The 440 yard race saw him up against Allan Elliot and Alan Sayers and current holder William Bainbridge. While in the 880 yard race Kedgley was the current holder of the title. Midgley did not place in either of the events with only the first three named in the newspapers and he was not among them.

In early March Midgley ran once more in the Otahuhu Amateur Athletic Club meeting and won the 220 yard senior championship. He narrowly beat Ernie McNeil who was a Richmond Rovers rugby league senior but a novice on the track. He however won the 440 yard senior championship by 15 yards in 57 seconds. He competed in several more Otahuhu club meetings some of which featured Bainbridge and Sayers before the final meeting on 11 April. Midgley finished in a dead heat for first with G Whye in the 880 yard race in 2m 27s.

=== Rugby league (Ponsonby), rugby union ===
In June 1935 Midgley was named in the Ponsonby reserve grade side. A week later on 19 June Midgley had a request for reinstatement to rugby union submitted to the New Zealand Rugby Union. It is unclear who he had played rugby union for in the past but most rugby league players had played rugby union at some point in their junior or adult years. His reinstatement was confirmed on 27 June. He then joined the Otahuhu rugby union club and was named in their senior side for games on 29 June and 20 July though it is unclear if he played as he was not mentioned in any match reports or named to play in any other games. The team lists featured 19 names so he may have been a back reserve.

In 1936 Midgley competed in an athletic meeting at Maungatapere in the 100, 150, 440, and 880 yard events.

=== Transfer to Marist Old Boys rugby league and senior debut ===
The 1937 season was to be the first of Midgley’s career in the first grade competition. He transferred to the Marist Old Boys (Marist Saints) club and debuted for them on 17 April in a preliminary round game against City Rovers at Carlaw Park on the number 2 field at 3pm. The Auckland Star wrote that “Marist presented a promising three-quarter in the second half, Midgley”. On 7 May a “J Midgley” was granted a transfer from South Auckland to Auckland. At the same meeting Jack McLeod a future New Zealand team mate of Midgley’s was granted a transfer from the Taranaki area. On 1 May Midgley scored his first senior grade points with 2 tries in a round 1 Fox Memorial Shield win over Newton Rangers. The match was played on the number 2 field at Carlaw Park with Marist winning 27 to 10. The Auckland Star wrote that a fine try was recorded by Midgley early in the second spell when he got the ball near the half way peg and streaked down the side line to beat four of the Newton men. It was a great solo run. He was said to have been prominent in the first half along with Reginald Haslam, and Jack Donovan. And he “showed a lot of pace” on the wing. The following week on 8 May in a 17–10 loss to Manukau Midgley was said to be “a lively three quarter, but with a tendency to get out of position”.

==== Representative debut with Auckland Pākehā ====
Perhaps somewhat surprisingly Midgley was then named in the reserves for the Auckland Pākehā side to play Auckland Māori on 12 May. Then on the day of the match he started on the wing. The Pākehā team won 24 to 14 with Midgley scoring one of their six tries. He was playing outside Arthur Kay who was centre three quarter, with Claude Dempsey at fullback and George Tittleton on the other wing. Midway through the second half Roy Powell, Arthur Kay and Walter Stockley combined with the ball to put Midgley away who “outpaced the opposition to score a nice try”.

He returned to his Marist side for a game against North Shore Albions on 15 May, and then against Richmond Rovers on 22 May. Marist were thrashed 55–15 after Midgley and full back Bill Glover left the field injured in the second half with Richmond already ahead 27–7. In a surprise 10–7 win over Mount Albert United in round 6 Midgley scored both of Marist’s tries. Haslam at centre “made scoring opportunities for winger Midgley, that brought victory”. The newspapers said that “Midgley played his best game to date and showed pace and skill in several breakaways”. The Herald wrote that he and Halsey “both played well on the wings, and were dangerous when any reasonable opportunities came their way”.

Midgley was then selected in an Auckland side to play South Auckland (Waikato) on 9 June at Carlaw Park. Ted Mincham was named inside him at centre. The game was played at 1:30 and was the curtain-raiser to another Auckland side which was playing Taranaki at 3pm. Midgley’s Auckland team won 26 to 12 and he scored three of their five tries. He could have scored another try but “fumbled” a pass from Mincham in the first half. Then in the second half Mincham made a break and passed to Midgley who was “tackled inches from the visitor’s line”. Once more he missed a try when Mincham held on instead of passing but a short time later he “was rewarded … when he raced 40 yards and badly beat Powell with a nice swerve to score”. This put Auckland in front 14–12. He followed up with two more tries as Auckland extended their lead. In remarks later the Auckland Star said that “in [William] McCallum and Midgley there were wings with the resource and speed so necessary to finalise scoring movements”.

On 12 June in Marists 11–4 win over City the Auckland Star said “Midgley and Halsey were a pair of good wingers”. Marist then travelled to Northland where they played against the Kamo club side at Jubilee Park in Whangārei with Midgley named to play on one of the wings. Marist won 28–0 and when they led 5–0 “Midgley figured in a brilliant run which almost pierced the entire Kamo team. Then he burst away again and this time got across at the corner, but in endeavouring to get round behind the posts crossed the dead-ball line”. Returning to Auckland for their round 8 match with Newton, Midgley scored two tries in their 22–0 win. He “displayed a fine turn of speed on the left flank”. They then lost to Manukau 20–13 though the backs for Marist “stood up well to the opposition” including Midgley. Both he and Halsey “had few chances”. In a narrow 15–13 win over Mount Albert Midgley, the “speedy winger” “stood out for good work”. He scored a try in their 18–10 win against North Shore on 24 July. Inside back “Donovan had opportunities to feed the wingers, Midgley and Matson, both of whom made the most of chances”. The two wingers “showed speed in the three quarter line”. Midgley scored another try in their 15–5 win over City on 31 July. With Marist leading 2–0 Midgley scored a “smart try”. Then later in the half he made “a strong run” from halfway and in passed to Matson who scored. The Herald commented that he “showed plenty of determination in his running”.

With the Fox Memorial competition drawing to an end Marist had an important win over competition leaders Richmond Rovers by 30 points to 24. It meant they closed to within a competition point of them. Midgley scored one of their six tries. His try came after a cross kick by Halsey beat brothers George Tittleton and Wally Tittleton enabling Midgley to gather and “score in a handy position” with John Anderson converting to secure the final score. He “did not have many chances on the wing, but displayed plenty of dash”. In their final match of the championship Marist needed to win and for Richmond to lose to Newton and Mount Albert to lose to North Shore but both sides won so Richmond finished on 21 competition points and Marist and North Shore tied for second on 20 points. Marist beat Ponsonby 17 to 8 with Midgley scoring yet another try. It was reported that “of the wingers Midgley was again the pick and in possession he was always a source of danger to the opposition”.

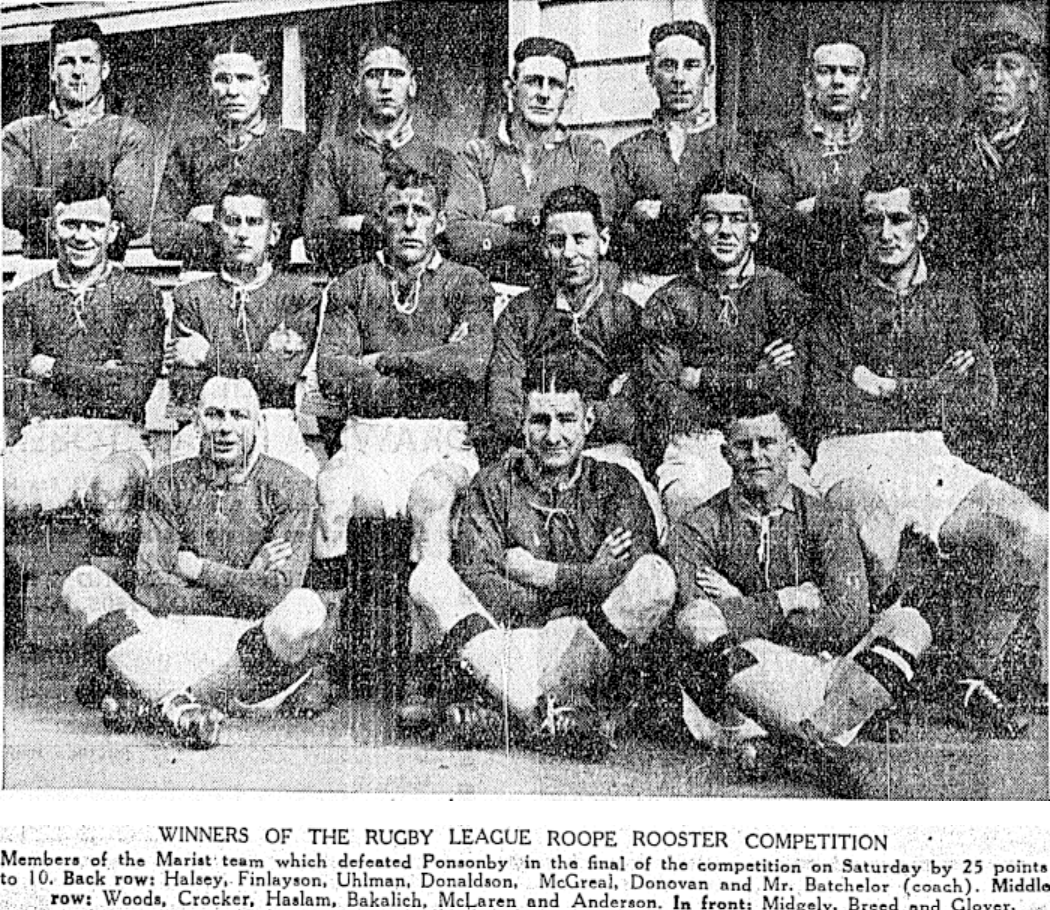

Marist now entered the Roope Rooster knockout competition and beat Newton in round 1 by 15 points to 6. In the first half “the ball travelled along the backline to Midgley on the wing, who had a clear run in. He grounded the ball over the line but hit the corner flag with his foot and the try was disallowed. Despite this miss he was “prominent on the wing” over the course of the game. Marist won their semi final on 11 September against City by 14 points to 2 with Midgley scoring one of their four tries. He “did well” along with their other winger Ivar Uhlman. Early in the game “Donovan raced Midgley into a perfect position, but the final pass was delayed and Hutchinson tackled Donovan”. Minutes later “Haslam made a fine opening for Midgley to score”. The Herald wrote that “Midgley was elusive and used his pace to good advantage”. Then in the Roope Rooster final Marist defeated Ponsonby 25–10 with Midgley again scoring. In the later stages of the game “brilliant play by Midgley and Haslam gained more points for Marist”. He was said to have been “outstanding” and “was always prominent in passing bouts, his speed enabling him to score a good try. Several times during the game Midgley combined effectively with the inside backs, and further impressed his claims for consideration as a representative three quarter”.

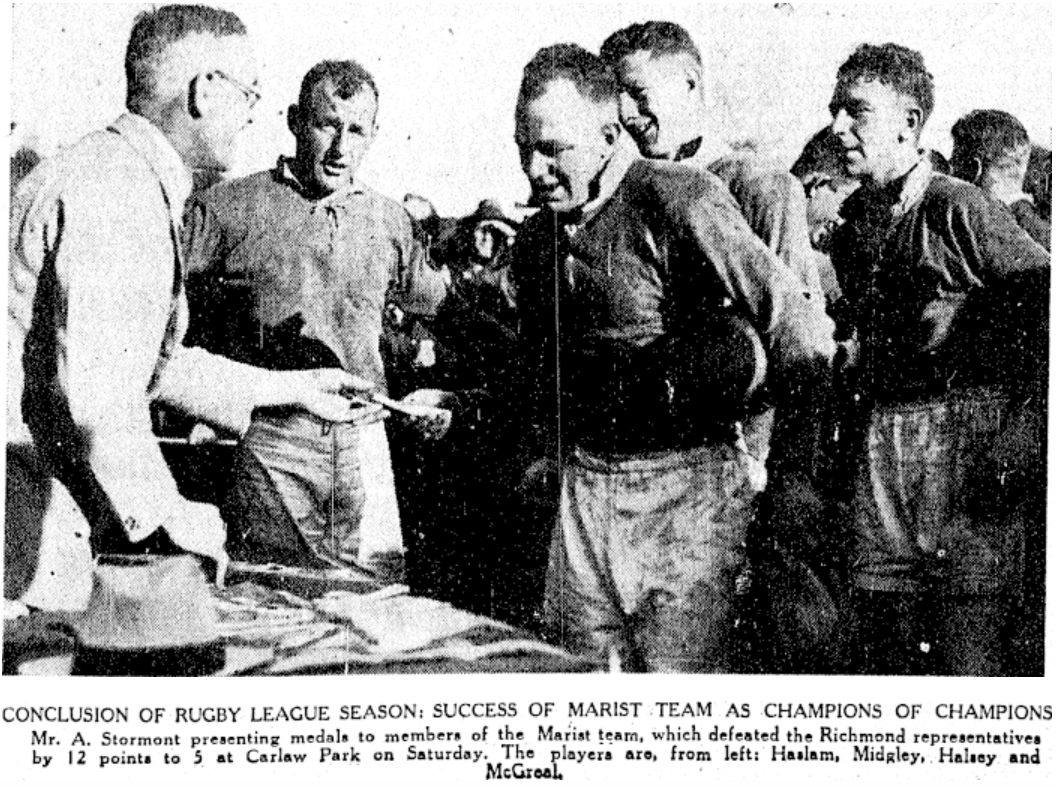

Marist's final game of the season was in the Stormont Memorial Shield match with winners of the championship, Richmond. It was a champion of champions style game played for each year. Marist won the match played at Carlaw Park on 2 October by 12 points to 5. Midgley and Halsey on the wings “ran with determination and made the most of their chances”. In a review of the club season the Herald said that Midgley was among players “likely to improve next season”. After the game Midgley was photographed receiving his winners medal which was presented by Bill Stormont’s father, John. Midgley ultimately finished the season with 12 tries for Marist which placed him second equal on the try scoring list.

Midgley was then selected by Hec Brisbane for the Auckland team to play New Zealand Māori on 9 October. The New Zealand Māori team had beaten the touring Australian side two months earlier and contained eight of the same players who were almost exclusively playing in the Auckland competition at the time with many coming from the Manukau senior side. The Auckland side lost 43–21 with Midgely scoring one of the losers five tries. Joe Cootes scored a try for New Zealand Māori when “Midgley appeared certain to catch him” but was held back by Jack McLeod. Despite the linesman drawing the referee’s attention to it the referee allowed the try to stand. It was converted by George Nēpia, the Māori full back. A while later “a nice run by Midgley resulted in D Black scoring for Auckland”. In the second half with he score 18–8 to the New Zealand Māori team, Bill Glover “placed Auckland in a good position and from a passing bout Midgley scored”. Thus ended Midgley’s debut season in first grade rugby league which saw him play 21 games, scoring 12 tries, while he also played one game for Auckland Pākehā and two games for Auckland.

=== (1938) Marist and New Zealand selection ===
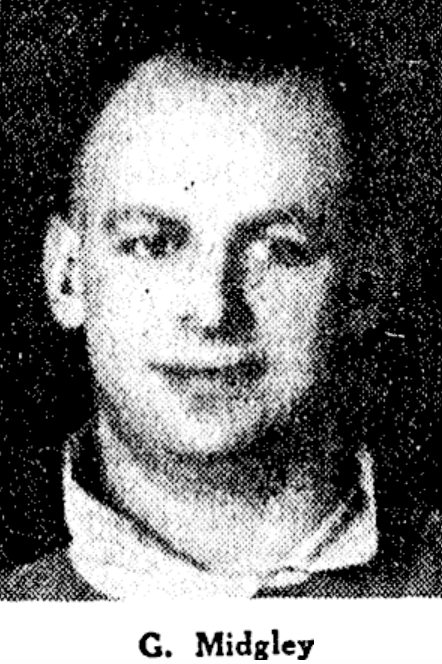
A photograph of Midgley which appeared in The New Zealand Herald on 23 May.

The 1938 season saw Midgley play 16 games for Marist, scoring 11 tries. He would also be selected for the North Island team and then chosen for the New Zealand team for their tour of Australia.

Midgley’s first game of the season was in a pre-season match against Papakura on 2 April. He scored a try in a narrow 16–15 win on the Carlaw Park number 2 field. Their first Fox Memorial Shield championship game was a week later on 9 April and Marist won 23–7 over North Shore. Halsey and Midgley were a “speedy wing pair” in support of Haslam. Midgley then played in an 18–4 loss to Manukau in round 3 and an 18–13 loss to Mount Albert in round 4. They lost their third consecutive match in round 5, this time to Richmond by 13 points to 8. Midgley scored both of Marist’s tries. Somewhat remarkably from this position with one win through 5 rounds Marist would go on to win the championship, winning 11 of their remaining 12 games. The Herald said that Robert Grotte “raced away before passing to Haslam, who beat the defence badly and Midgley scored the best try of the game”. The Auckland Star wrote “Midgley was the outstanding three quarter for Marist”. In comments later in the week they said “despite clever play by Grotte at the base of the scrum the Marist backs in attack did not work like a machine, but Midgley, who is one of the best wings in the game, got two brilliant tries and demonstrated the value he is to a side provided he gets reasonable chances”. Marist began to turn their season around on 14 May with a big 45–11 win over City with Midgley scoring three of their 11 tries. He was “Marist’s best back” and “showed a lot of speed on the wing, and ran with determination”.

==== North Island selection ====
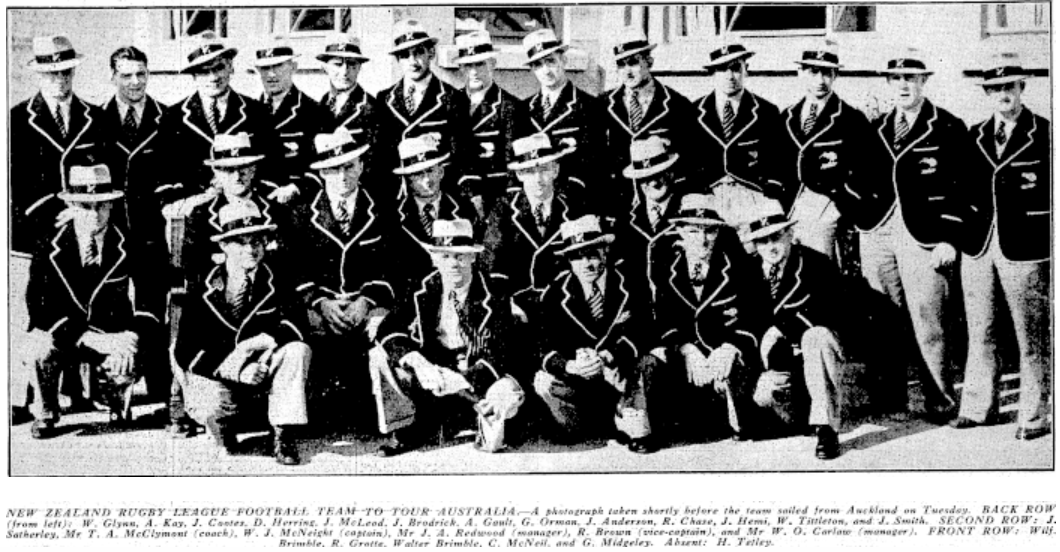
NZ Team 1938

Midgley missed selection for the Auckland team to play the Rest of North Island side on 18 May, though he was named in the reserves. The Auckland team thrashed their opposition 67–14 and subsequently the North Island was composed almost entirely of Auckland players, with the exception of Joe Cootes from Wellington. Midgley was named to play on the wing by selectors Thomas McClymont, Hec Brisbane, and Gordon Hooker. The North Island trounced their South Island opponents by 55 points to 3. Midgley scored the North Island’s first try early in the game after the South Island failed to clear from a scrum and he “raced over to score”. Overall he and Clarry McNeil showed “much promise” as the two wing three quarters.

==== New Zealand selection and tour of Australia ====
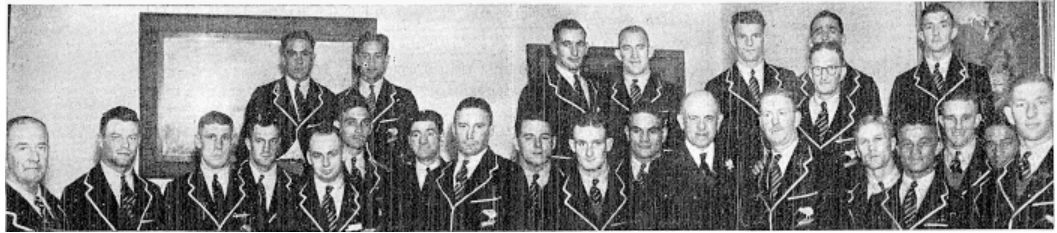
NZ team at a civic reception. McNeil is 3rd from the right in the front row

Following the game Midgley was named in the New Zealand team to tour Australia by selectors Hec Brisbane, Jim Amos, and Thomas McClymont. In Auckland Star comments on the selections they said that “the league game in New Zealand is lacking in outstanding wing three quarters of the heavy and fast type, but both Midgley and McNeil are representative of the lighter type, and have pace and dash to finalise scoring movements, provided that they are adequately catered for by the inside men”. Midgley then returned to his Marist side which beat Papakura 11–8. He placed a centre kick which was misjudged by Cooke, the Papakura fullback and his new New Zealand team mate, Robert Grotte followed through to score. Before the team departed the New Zealand Herald wrote Rangi Chase is a good player in any position, and is perhaps a more solid wing than either Midgley or McNeil. Both the wings chosen, Midgley and McNeil, however, are speedy players who should do well”. The New Zealand team departed Auckland on board the Canadian – Australasian liner, RMS Niagara on the evening of 31 May. The same day they were given a civic farewell by the mayor, Sir Ernest Davis at the Auckland Town Hall at noon following a morning tea at George Court, Limited. While the night before they had a farewell ball at the Peter Pan cabaret.

In comments about the New Zealand players The Courier-Mail (Brisbane) newspaper noted that both the wing three quarters were “very fast”. The Sydney Morning Herald reported that Midgley was 26 years old and weighed 11 stone 2 pounds. His age was some way off as he was still a month shy of his 23rd birthday. In longer comments about the players in the Sydney Morning Herald on 2 June saw Midgley described as a “wing three quarter who has shown out prominently in club football for the past three seasons. He is fast, and handles well, but is inclined to be erratic. He has a tendency at times to go infield to no purpose”. In the 11 June edition of The Rugby League News, the main rugby league magazine in Australia, they wrote “Gordon Midgley graduated from Ellerslie juniors to Marist seniors. A fast, straight runner, with an elusive swerve that gets tries; handles well”.

New Zealand's first tour match was against New South Wales at the Sydney Cricket Ground on 11 June. Midgely was not selected for the game with Rangi Chase and Ray Brown on the wings. Before a crowd of 28,303 New Zealand was unlucky to lose 25–12 after losing Arthur Kay to injury during the game and playing a man short when they had been on top. Midgley missed selection for the second game against the same opponents two days later with Clarry McNeil and Chase on the wings. New Zealand bounced back to win convincingly 37–18.

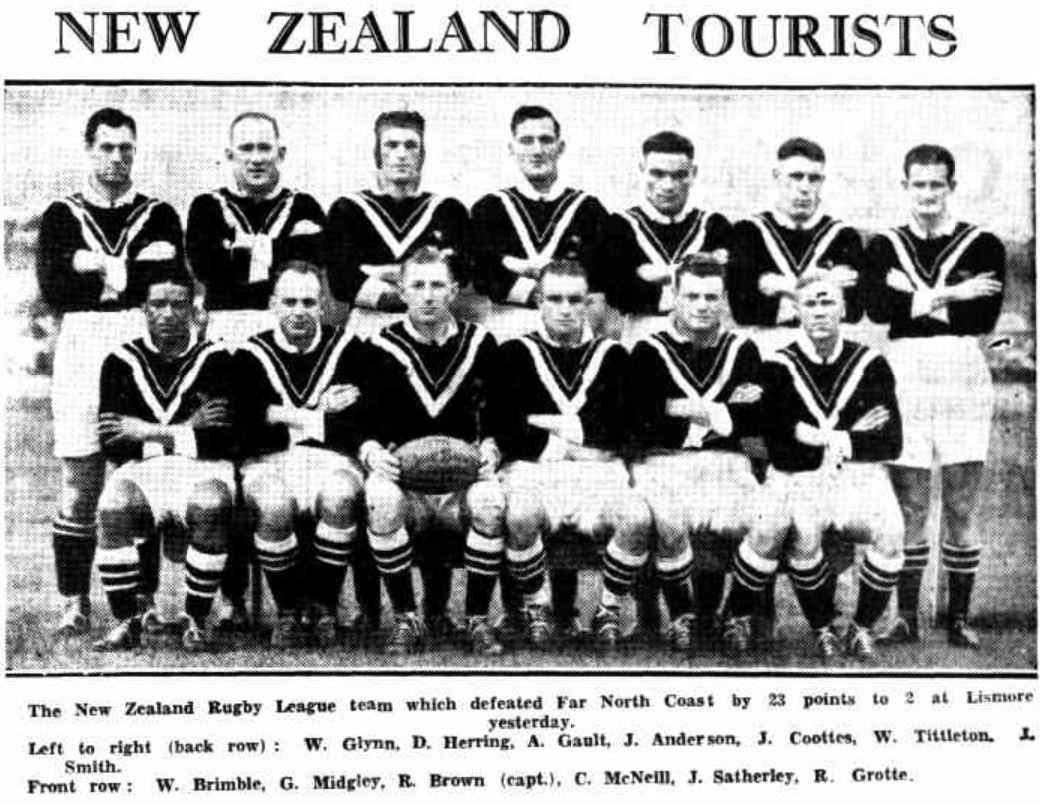
New Zealand RL team to play Far North Coast in 1938

Midgley’s New Zealand debut was in the third tour match, against North Coast on 15 June, which was New Zealand’s third tour game. The game was played at the Recreation Ground in Lismore before a crowd of 2,200 in drizzly weather on a “soggy ground”. He was on the wing with Ray Brown at centre along with Wally Tittleton, with McNeil on the other wing. New Zealand won by 23 points to 2 against the country side. New Zealand’s first try came when Walter Brimble “broke through at the 25 yards after a pass from Midgley and he touched down between the posts” with Jack Smith converting it to give New Zealand a 5–0 lead” which it remained until halftime. Midgley’s pass was said to have been “well-timed” with Brimble going through under the posts. Later in the first half “New Zealand narrowly missed adding to their score 10 minutes before half-time, when Midgley made a 30 yard dash, but delayed his transfer to John Anderson, who was undefended, and finally was spreadeagled by [fullback] D. O’Connor. That movement ended a yard from the try line”. The Northern Star (Lismore) newspaper wrote that the backs of either team did not play as well as the forwards “with the possible exception of Kilroy (winger, North Coast), and Brown and Midgley (New Zealand) took the game as seriously”. At one point North Coast broke away deep in their own territory and went 80 yards down field. They were challenged by New Zealand’s cover defenders and O’Connor passed to their tall centre Barry, but he “was hauled down from behind by Midgley”.

Midgley was named in a 17 man squad for the 4th tour game against Queensland on 18 June but was ultimately omitted with Ray Brown and Jack Smith chosen on the wings. He was then named in a 15 man squad for the game against Toowoomba on 22 June. He was selected in the game day team with Arthur Kay in the other wing position. New Zealand won narrowly by 12 points to 11 before a crowd of 2,500 at the Toowoomba Athletic Ground in Toowoomba. The New Zealand backs were criticised overall with only full back Jack Hemi said to have played well. The Courier-Mail said that “G. Midgley showed trickiness and a fair amount of pace on his wing, but the halfbacks, R. Grotte and W. Brimble, were weak links, particularly in their passing”. Midgley was then named in a 16 man squad for the second game against Queensland on 25 June but Brown and Kay were preferred on match day on the wings with Midgley, Wilfred Brimble, and John Anderson omitted.

Midgley’s third tour game came in their seventh match against NSW Group 4 at Tamworth Oval on 29 June. New Zealand won 26 to 15 before 2,200 spectators. Midgley had Arthur Kay inside him at centre. The Courier Mail (Brisbane) wrote that “the nippiness of the Brimble brothers, working from the base of the scrum, the penetration and pace of A. Kay, the centre, and his winger G. Midgley, and the great work of J. Anderson and J. Brodrick in the forward division disconcerted the Group side early”. Midgley was not chosen for the next game of the tour against Newcastle on 2 July but he was selected in the final game of the tour against Sydney on 6 July. There were 4,000 in attendance at the Sydney Cricket Ground with Sydney scoring near the end to draw the game 19–19. New Zealand had trailed 11–5 at halftime before taking a 19–14 lead until Sydney scored between the posts. New Zealand then attacked strongly in the final minutes but were unable to break the deadlock. During the second half New Zealand made a cross kick along the ground which “saw Kay gather the ball and pass to Midgley, who just managed to ground it over the Sydney line” for his only try of the tour. Rangi Chase had been involved in the lead up and had made a “splendid opening” in the build up. Jack Hemi converted it to narrow the score to 14–12 in favour of Sydney. The Labor Daily newspaper described Midgley’s try as “as good as any Sydney has seen this year. He cut through in Farnsworth-like style. Although several Sydney men barred his path to the line, he put down his head and went over”. Shortly after “New Zealand came hard and fast and only atrocious handling kept the side out. At last, however, Midgley started a movement which, after hanging fire momentarily in the ruck was continued, with the ball being thrown towards the right wing, where, after Tittleton and Kay had handled the later scored a fine try”. Hemi’s conversion put New Zealand 17–14 in front. The Labor Daily said that “the New Zealanders have improved as a result of their tour of Australia. Midgley, Hemi, Kay, and Jack McLeod are quite good enough for an Australian side”. The Courier Mail said that “New Zealand’s outstanding backs were Brimble, Kay, Tittleton, and Midgley”.

==== Return to Auckland and Marist championship win ====
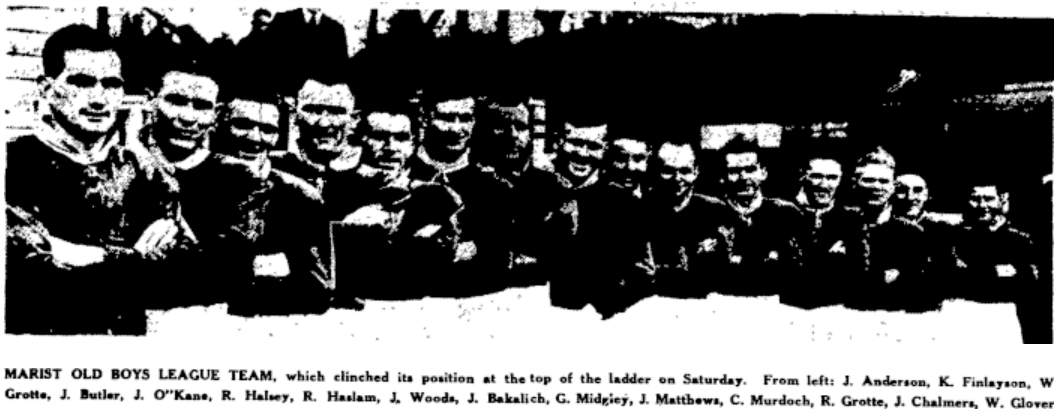
Midgley, 6th from the right in the Marist team on August 20, 1938 which won the championship.

Midgley then returned with the side on board the Canadian Australasian liner, Aorangi on 11 July. After arriving back in Auckland a match was arranged between the returning tourists and Auckland. Midgley was named in a 15 man squad but was the three quarter who was left out of the match day side. He then returned to the Marist side for their round 14 match with Papakura which they won 8–0 on 23 July. His return along with John Anderson and Robert Grotte had bolstered the side which was now tied for first in the championship with Mount Albert on 18 competition points, four points clear of four teams (Manukau, Newton, Richmond, and Ponsonby). Marist however had a game in hand over Mount Albert. They then beat City 9–0 and with Mount Albert having a bye, took a clear lead in the Fox Memorial championship. In Round 16 Midgley had the best try performance of his career, scoring four of Marist’s try and a convincing 32–4 win over Richmond. The Herald said “Midgley, the speedy Marist wing three quarter had a field day in scoring four tries. His tricky running and speed completely nonplussed the opposition at times”. When he broke clear he “carried too much speed for the opposition”. In an 11–8 loss in round 17 he had “few chances” on the wing. Marist then entered the final round needing a win over Newton to secure the 1938 Fox Memorial championship. They achieved this with a 10–7 win on 20 August. Midgley “showed a big turn of speed on the wing, and made several brilliant dashes”. He “had two speedy runs early in the first spell but found [Claude] Dempsey a stumbling block. The Newton fullback lowered the winger each time with brilliant tackles. Midgley injured his shoulder in the tackles and later had to receive attention on the sideline”.

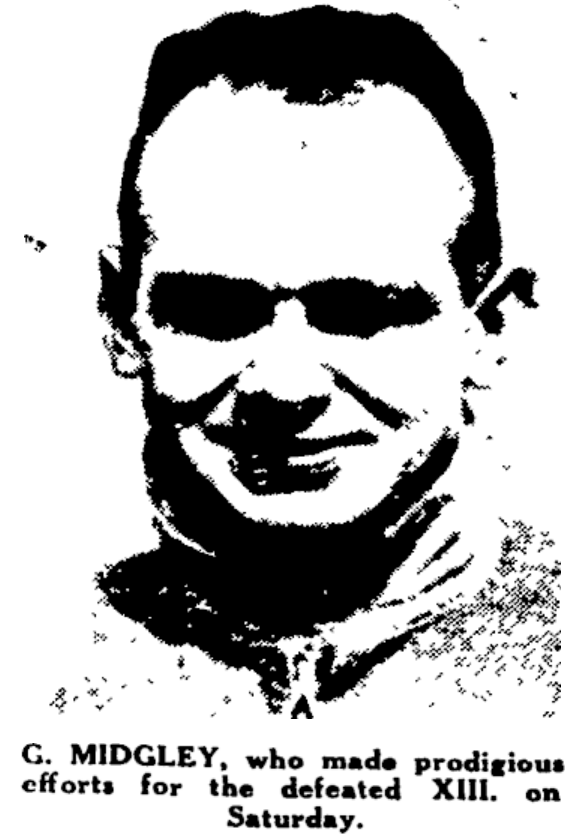

In the first round of the Roope Rooster knockout competition Midgley was absent from the side, possibly in connection to his injury in the previous game. They were beaten in round 2 by North Shore with Midgley and Matthews on the wings lacking opportunities. Marist were then eliminated from the Phelan Shield consolation competition by Mount Albert before they played the Eastern Suburbs club side which was touring from Sydney. Marist was their first opponent on the tour with the match being played at Carlaw Park on 24 September. Eastern Suburbs won 36–15 before a crowd of 9,000. The Herald wrote that “Midgley on the wing was disappointing, and two tries would have come his way in the first spell if he had been in his correct position”. During the second half Midgely tried to clear from near his own goal line but his kick was charged down by Dunn who then scored. Marist’s final game of the season was in the Stormont Shield ‘champion of champions’ match against the Roope Rooster winner, Richmond. Richmond won by 9 points to 8 with Midgley scoring one of Marist’s two tries. He and Matthews showed “occasional flashes of brilliance” on the wings. A photograph of Midgley appeared in the Auckland Star with the caption underneath reading “G. Midgley, who made a prodigious efforts for the defeated XIII. On Saturday”. At one point in the second half he and Robert Grotte made a break with the final pass to Ken Finlayson seeing him race over only for it to be ruled a forward pass.

=== 1939 Marist ===
The 1939 season saw Midgley play 16 games for Marist, scoring ten tries. However he was not selected in any representative teams. His first game of the season was in a Fox Memorial round 1 game against Newton. Marist won 13 to 5 with Midgley scoring one of their three tries. They then played a touring Sydney XIII though Midgley was not named in the side. Then in a loss to City 4 points to 3 on 22 April he was among a group of Marist backs who were “always prominent”. During the first half Midgley had “penetrated far before losing the ball”. Later on he and John Anderson nearly created a try for Donovan. It was said that he “showed some of his best form, and was more enterprising than usual”.

It appears that Midgley missed their game against Papakura on 29 April with it later reported that Marist were missing a “big percentage of their “regulars” who were down with the flu”. He was named in the Marist sides to play Mount Albert, Ponsonby, and Manukau but there was relatively little coverage of the games in the newspapers and his play was not mentioned. On 5 June in a midweek catch up game Marist lost to Richmond 24–10 with Midgley playing in the unaccustomed position of centre three quarter.

He missed their next game against Newton before scoring a try in a 26–14 loss to Richmond on 17 June. His try came after a Reg Haslam run on full time. Neither he nor Halsey on the other wing were said to have had many chances. Then in a round 5, 20–5 win over City Midgley returned to try scoring form with three tries. He “gave easily his best display of the season. He has only to repeat this form to be given a trial in the representative matches”. He scored another try in a 7–5 win against Papakura the following week and was said to be “in good form” in the Marist backline. Midgley and Halsey “were fast and determined runners, who took a good deal of stopping”. He scored again in their next match with North Shore in an 18–5 win. The Herald wrote that “the wings, Midgley and Matthews, two of the fastest players in the code, both played excellent games”.

Midgley then appears to have been named in the reserves for their game against Mount Albert before playing against Ponsonby and then being back in the match day reserves for the 12 August game against Manukau. It was the final game of the championship for Marist and they finished second to last. In their round 1 Roope Rooster match he was named to play. Marist won 7 to 3 with Midgley and Halsey playing “splendidly on the wing”. Midgley “used his speed to advantage”. He scored a try in the Roope Rooster semi final win over Manukau (31–15). They then won the final 13–11 over Mount Albert on 16 September with Midgley scoring once more. The Marist backs were said to have been superior and he gave “an excellent display”. Marist’s final game of the season was in the Stormont Shield final against Mount Albert. Midgley scored yet again though Marist lost 21 to 9 on 23 September.

=== 1940 retirement ===
The 1940 season was the last of Gordon Midgley’s career. He played intermittently for Marist, taking the field only six times, scoring just the one try. His sporting year started with a friendly cricket match against the Star Sports Club. Midgley captained their opponents which was a side made up of campers who were holidaying at Mount Manuganui. The game included well known sports people such as Jim Parkinson, Mort Stephens (who played rugby league in England for St Helens), Sid Empson a good Auckland cricketer, and George Cook.

In a preliminary round game for Marist against Richmond, Midgley scored his only try of the season. The game was drawn 8–8 on 6 April. He played in their second preliminary game against Papakura and then in their opening round championship match against Newton on 20 April he was substituted by Dave McWilliams after being injured in the first half. It was not stated what his injury was but he was not named in any of the Marist lineups from 4 May until 20 July when he played in Marists 20–10 win over Manukau. He played in the five eighths with Hughes and the pair were said to be “sound supports” for Nicholson at half back. He was named to play in the five eighths again against City a week later. It seems that Midgley was back on the wing for their 17–16 round 14 win over Mount Albert. “Nicholson, Chalmers, McWilliams and Midgley were spritely on attack and also defended resolutely”. It appears that this was Midgley’s last ever game for Marist as he was omitted from the team lists which were published over the remainder of the season. Midgley had retired from the sport.

In 1941 with World War 2 well underway Midgley was named to attend preliminary training to become a flight rigger. The training was said to be taking place at Harewood. It is unlikely that Midgley spent any time on active duty as his name does not appear in any of the World War 2 records for New Zealanders.

== Personal life ==
Midgely lived in the Ellerslie area for much of his life. He and his family lived at 504 Great South Road. On 12 February 1938 Midgley’s younger brother Sidney was riding after dark on the road with a friend (Robert Earle Thorley) who was struck by a vehicle and killed. A year earlier on 25 May Midgley’s grandfather on his mother’s side, Samuel Taylor, was hit and killed at the Ellerslie railway station by the workers train. He was aged 78 and was living with them at the time. Taylor was crossing the tracks while running an errand for Midgley’s mother, Ethel.

The family continued to live at the same address on Great South Road in Ellerslie until the mid to late 1940s. According to census and war records Gordon Midgley was a metalworker by trade. His father, Arthur, was a labourer while Sidney was a carpenter. Sidney married Valda Margaret Palmer in 1946 and moved out of the family house leaving Gordon living with his parents. By 1949 they moved but only a short distance up the same road to 688 Great South Road and Gordon was still working as a metal worker. They continued to live at the same address though his father, Arthur died in 1954 leaving Gordon to live with his mother. In 1957 and 1960 his name was listed as George rather than Gordon, though in 1963 it was back to Gordon. He continued to work as a metal worker throughout this period.

Gordon never married and had no children. Shortly before his death he and his mother had moved to 9 Tecoma Street in Ellerslie. He died on 25 August 1965 aged 50. He was cremated at Purewa Cemetery two days later leaving behind his mother and brother. His mother Ethel died in 1973 aged 84, while Sidney died in 2002 aged 81. His nephew Keith Midgley played rugby union for Port Albert and the Rodney sub-union and North Auckland Juniors in the 1960s.
