= Robert Grotte =

New Zealand international rugby league footballer

- Robert Grotte in 1935

Personal information
- Full name: Robert Michael Grotte
- Born: 3 February 1913 Honolulu, Hawaii, United States
- Died: 15 December 1964 (aged 51) Auckland, New Zealand

Playing information
- Position: Five-eighth, Halfback
Club
Years	Team	Pld	T	G	FG	P
1934	Marist Old Boys	12	1	0	0	3
1935–37	St. George	13	1	0	0	3
1938–40	Marist Old Boys	37	10	0	0	30
1941–42	City Rovers	17	3	0	0	9
1942	City-Ōtāhuhu	7	1	0	0	3
1943	City Rovers	9	0	0	0	0
1944	Ponsonby United	1	2	0	0	6
1945	Town	1	0	0	0	0
	Total	97	18	0	0	54
Representative
Years	Team	Pld	T	G	FG	P
1938	New Zealand	3	1	0	0	3
1941	Auckland	1	0	0	0	0

Coaching information
Representative
Years	Team	Gms	W	D	L	W%
1941	City Rovers	22	10	2	10	45
1944	City Rovers	21	15	0	6	71

Robert Michael Grotte (3 February 1913 – 15 December 1964) was a New Zealand professional rugby league footballer who played in the 1930s.

Grotte came to St. George in 1935 and had a successful season, playing 12 first grade games. He moved to the Moree district to play one season in 1936, and then returned to St. George again for the 1937 season playing one first grade match. In 1938 he moved to Auckland and played for Marist Old Boys. He was also named in the touring Kiwi team that toured Australia in 1938 and he played one games for his national team. While at Marist he played 3 seasons with his brother William who was a forward.

Robert Grotte died on 15 December 1964, in Auckland and is buried at Waikumete Cemetery.
