= Marist Saints =

NZ rugby league club, based in Mount Albert

Club information
- Full name: Marist Saints
- Nickname: Saints
- Short name: Saints
- Colours: Green / Gold
- Founded: 1919

Current details
- Grounds: Murray Halberg Park; Margaret Griffen Park
- Coach: Zane Pocklington
- Manager: Katherine Tamaseu-Russell
- Captain: Chris Sio
- Competition: Auckland Rugby League

Records
- Premierships: 1924, 1931, 1938, 1948, 1965, 1966
- Minor premierships: 1947, 1948
- Roope Rooster: 1928, 1929, 1932, 1937, 1939, 1946, 1958, 1966, 1971, 1997
- Stormont Shield: 1928, 1929, 1932, 1937, 1950, 1958, 1965, 1966
- Sharman Cup: 1992

The Marist Saints is a rugby league club based in Mount Albert, New Zealand. They currently compete in the top grade in Auckland Rugby League, the Fox Memorial Premiership.

== History ==
Founded in 1919, the Marist club first won the Fox Memorial in 1924. They originally played at the Auckland Domain before moving to their current home, in Murray Halberg Park. Their lower grade teams now also play matches at Margaret Griffen Park in Lynfield.

=== First season and match ===
In 1919 Marist entered teams in first grade and also in the second grade. The second grade side defaulted their first match and then withdrew from the competition. On 3 May 1919, Marist played in their first ever match. It was played at Victoria Park on the #2 field against Newton Rangers. There were 4,500 spectators to watch the match which was played simultaneously with the Maritime v City Rovers match on the adjacent field. Marist lost 28–3 with Petterson scoring their only points through a try. They struggled throughout the season losing all their first grade matches.

| 3 May | Newton | 28–3 | Marist | Victoria Park 2 |
| 3:00 | Try: George Iles 2, William Clarke 2, Jack Keenan, Bill Williams; Con: Phil Castles 5 | | Try: Petterson | Attendance: 4,500; Referee: Thompson |

=== First win in first grade competition (Roope Rooster) 1919 ===
They had their first win in a first grade competition in the first round of the Roope Rooster competition on 26 July 1919. They defeated North Shore Albions on Auckland Domain by 17 points to 3.

| 26 July | Marist | 17–3 | North Shore | Auckland Domain 3 |
| 3:00 | Try: White, Keenan 2 Con: Clarke, Billy Ghent; Pen: Clarke; Drop: Robertson | | Try: Leonard Boon | Referee: Eddowes |

=== First win in first grade championship (1920) ===
In 1920 Marist entered teams in the first grade, second grade, and fourth grade. Their second grade side withdrew after 11 rounds, while their fourth grade side withdrew after 2 rounds. Their first grade team drew in round 2 against Newton Rangers but then had their first ever win in the first grade championship (Monteith Shield) when they defeated Grafton Athletic 15–3 at Victoria Park. Bill Stormont and Billy Ghent scored tries and A. Eustace kicked a goal. They ultimately won 7 games along with their draw and finished third in the seven team competition.

| 22 May | Marist | 15–3 | Grafton | Victoria Park |
| 3:00 | Try: Bill Stormont, Billy Ghent, Unknown x 1 Con: Billy Ghent, A Eustace, Unknown x 1 | | Try: Horace Neal | Referee: Clayton |

=== 2000 to 2005 ===
Between 2000 and 2005 the Saints were involved in the Bartercard Cup alongside the Richmond Bulldogs as the Marist Richmond Brothers.

== Notable players ==
=== New Zealand representatives ===
Kiwi representative number in square brackets:

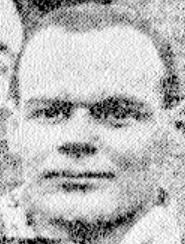
Hec Brisbane

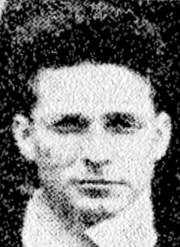
Charles Gregory

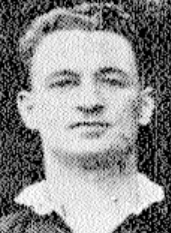
Jack Kirwan

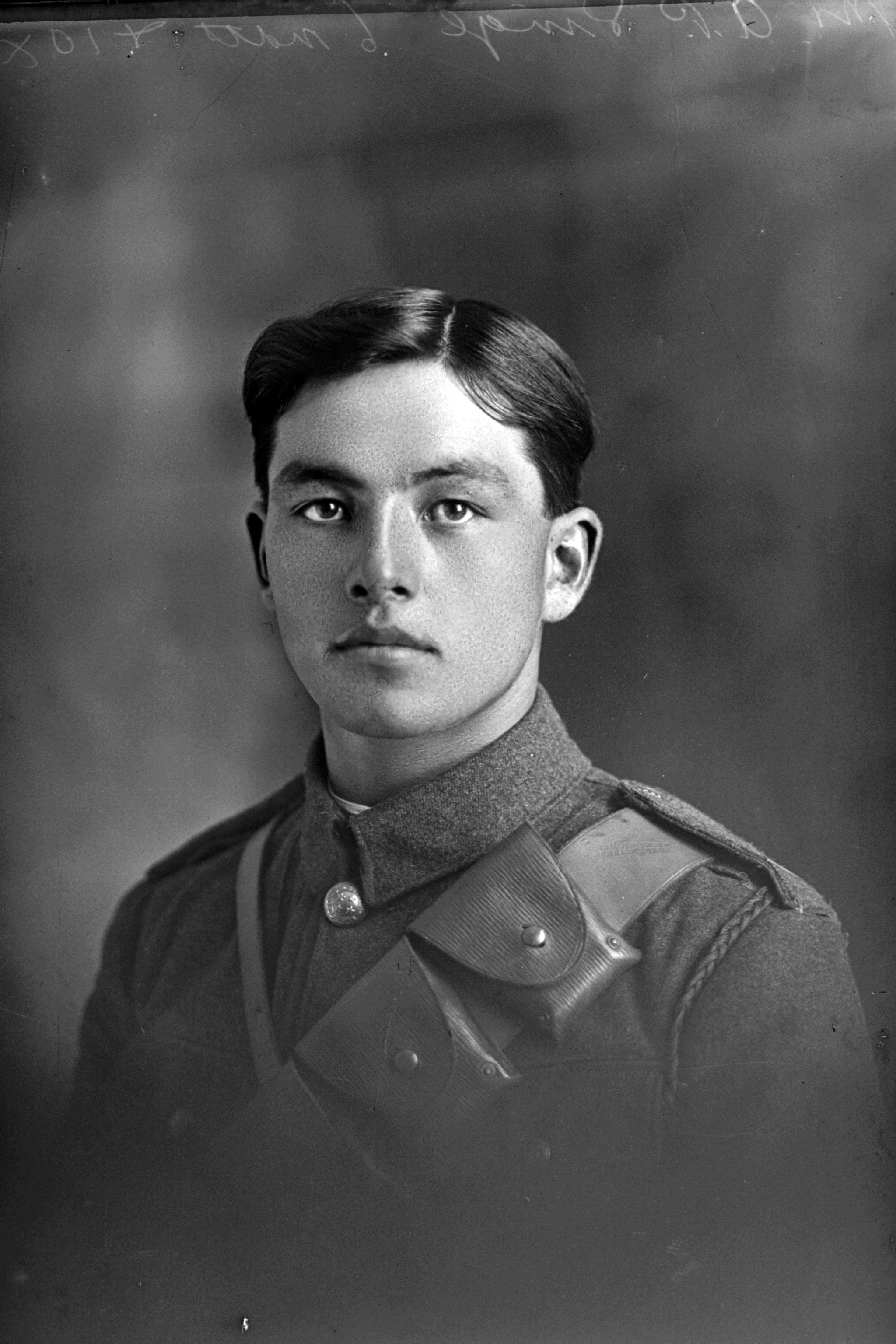
Arthur Singe

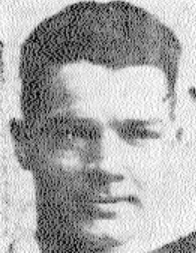
Claude List

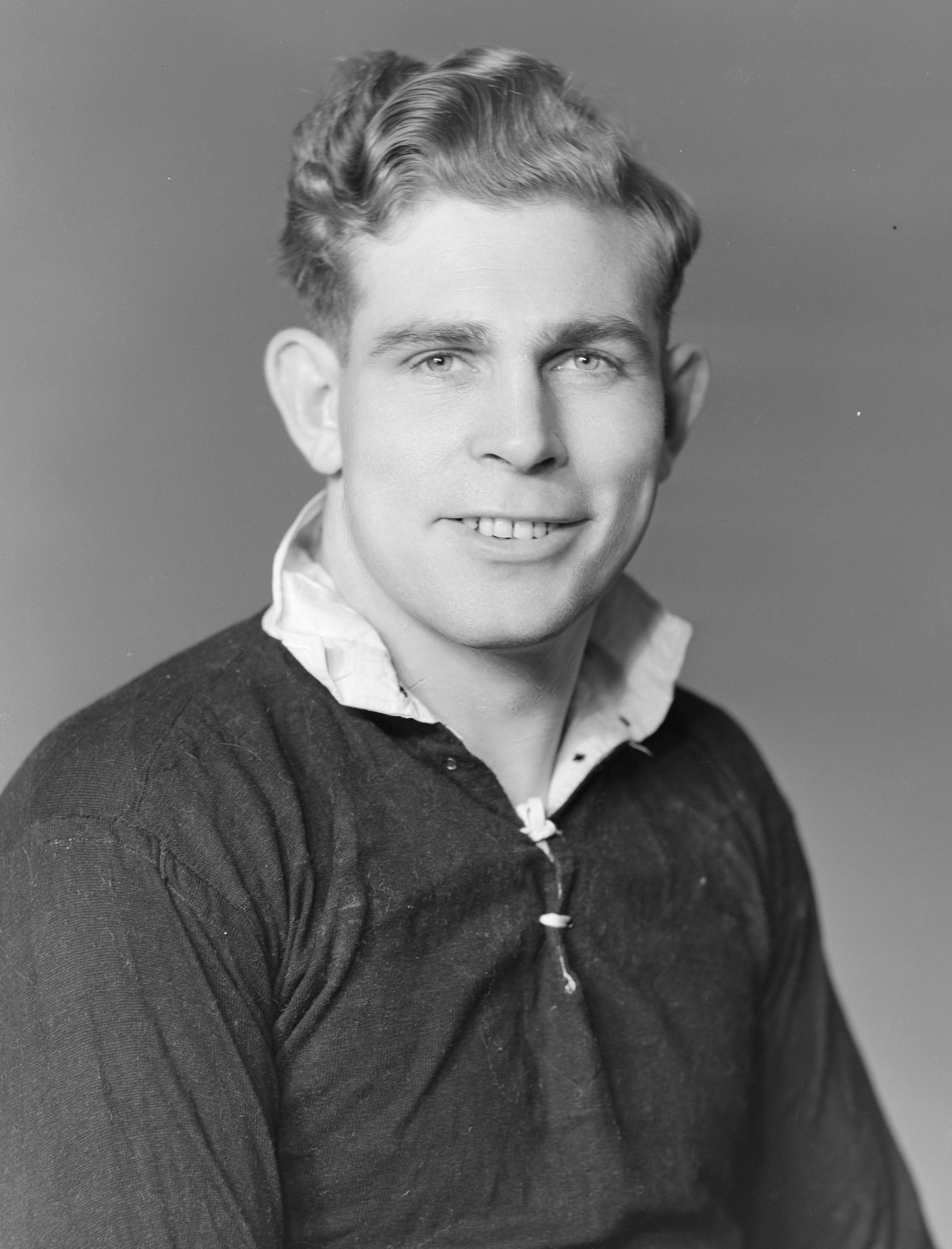
Johnny Simpson

- William "Bill" Stormont [140] (1920) (54 matches for Marist, 1920–1924)
- Hec Brisbane [153] (1924–32) (158 matches for Marist, 1923–1934)
- Jim O'Brien [157] (1924–28) (92 matches for Marist, 1924–1930)
- Lyall Stewart [163] (1924) (13 matches for Marist in 1924)
- Charles "Pope" Gregory [171] (1925–30) (87 matches for Marist, 1924–1931)
- Jack Kirwan [174] (1925–27) (40 matches for Marist, 1924–1928)
- Arthur Singe [179] (1925–26) (48 matches for Marist, 1921–1926)
- Claude List [190] (1932) (55 matches for Marist, 1930–1934)
- Wilfrid Hassan [221] (1932) (94 matches for Marist, 1928–1934)
- Gordon "Stump" Campbell [223] (1932) (93 matches for Marist, 1928–1934)
- Norm Campbell [224] (1932) (104 matches for Marist, 1929–1936)
- Jim Laird [226] (1932–35) (56 matches for Marist, 1932–1935)
- Alan Clarke [227] (1932) (69 matches for Marist, 1929–1934)
- John Anderson [256] (1938) (127 matches for Marist, 1936-41 & 1945)
- Robert Grotte [260] (1938) (37 matches for Marist, 1938–1940)
- Gordon Midgley [263] (1938) (59 matches for Marist, 1937–1940)
- William "George" Davidson [302]
- Des Barchard [307]
- Harry "Doug" Anderson [311]
- Robert "Jimmy" Edwards [331]
- Ronald McKay [344]
- Neville Denton [359]
- Brian Reidy [383]
- William "Bill" Schultz [394]
- Paul Schultz [434]
- Oscar Danielson [454]
- Anthony "Tony" Kriletich [459]
- Gene Ngamu [642]
- Motu Tony [686]
- Francis Meli [689]
- Sonny Bill Williams [706]
- Roy Asotasi [710]
- Jerome Ropati [716]
- Kalifa Fai-Fai Loa [766]
- David Ue'ikaetau Fusitu'a [799]
- Tuimoala Lolohea [791]

=== Other New Zealand rugby league representatives ===
Includes players who played for New Zealand but not while at the Marist club

- Bob Mitchell [87] (2 matches for Marist in 1919)
- Neville St George [178] (13 matches for Marist from 1919 to 1921)
- Horace Nunn [150] (3 matches for Marist in 1919)
- Ernie Herring [112] (6 matches for Marist in 1921–22)
- John Lang [127] (35 matches for Marist from 1921 to 1924)
- Nelson Bass [137] (19 matches for Marist from 1922 to 1923)
- Norm Loveridge [141] (23 matches for Marist from 1920 to 1922)
- George Gardiner [185] (11 matches for Marist in 1924)

Notable former juniors include Roy Asotasi, Sonny Bill Williams, Jerome Ropati, Motu Tony, Francis Meli, Gene Ngamu, Rudi Wulf, Ben Waerea-Fisher, Siuatonga Likiliki, Manu Ma'u, Bill Tupou, Kalifa Fai-Fai Loa, David Fusitua, Mason Lino, Tuimoala Lolohea, Delouise Hoeter, Adam Tuimavave Gerrard, Lamar Liolevave, Anthony Swann, Des Barchard.

=== Other notable players ===
Johnny Simpson played for Marist seniors from 1941 to 1944 and was a junior there. He switched codes in the mid-1940s and became an All Black in 1947, playing 30 matches for New Zealand up until 1950.

== Marist Senior Team records (1919–1945 and 1990-2004, 2020-25) ==
The season record for the most senior men's team in the club.

| Season | Grade | Name | Played | W | D | L | PF | PA | PD | Pts | Position (Teams) |
|---|---|---|---|---|---|---|---|---|---|---|---|
| 1919 | 1st Grade (Myers Cup) | Marist Old Boys | 8 | 0 | 0 | 8 | 22 | 148 | -126 | 0 | 7th of 8 |
| 1920 | 1st Grade (Myers Cup) | Marist Old Boys | 11 | 7 | 1 | 3 | 102 | 79 | 23 | 15 | 3rd of 7 |
| 1921 | 1st Grade (Monteith Shield) | Marist Old Boys | 9 | 5 | 0 | 4 | 158 | 122 | 34 | 10 | 3rd of 7 |
| 1922 | 1st Grade (Monteith Shield) | Marist Old Boys | 14 | 9 | 1 | 4 | 258 | 192 | 66 | 19 | 3rd of 8 |
| 1923 | 1st Grade (Monteith Shield) | Marist Old Boys | 12 | 9 | 0 | 2 | 170 | 108 | 62 | 18 | 3rd of 7 |
| 1924 | 1st Grade (Monteith Shield) | Marist Old Boys | 15 | 11 | 1 | 3 | 345 | 147 | 198 | 23 | 1st of 9 |
| 1925 | 1st Grade (Monteith Shield) | Marist Old Boys | 11 | 6 | 0 | 5 | 162 | 112 | 50 | 12 | 3rd of 7 |
| 1926 | 1st Grade (Monteith Shield) | Marist Old Boys | 11 | 7 | 0 | 4 | 167 | 144 | 23 | 14 | 3rd of 7 |
| 1927 | 1st Grade (Monteith Shield) | Marist Old Boys | 11 | 7 | 0 | 4 | 155 | 114 | 41 | 14 | 4th of 7 |
| 1928 | 1st Grade (Monteith Shield) | Marist Old Boys | 12 | 5 | 1 | 6 | 154 | 170 | -16 | 11 | 5th of 7 |
| 1929 | 1st Grade (Monteith Shield) | Marist Old Boys | 14 | 7 | 3 | 4 | 206 | 157 | 49 | 17 | 4th of 8 |
| 1930 | 1st Grade (Monteith Shield) | Marist Old Boys | 13 | 6 | 3 | 4 | 200 | 147 | 53 | 15 | 4th of 8 |
| 1931 | 1st Grade (Fox Memorial) | Marist Old Boys | 12 | 11 | 0 | 1 | 204 | 88 | 116 | 22 | 1st of 7 |
| 1932 | 1st Grade (Fox Memorial) | Marist Old Boys | 10 | 5 | 2 | 3 | 129 | 105 | 24 | 12 | 2nd of 6 |
| 1933 | 1st Grade (Fox Memorial) | Marist Old Boys | 10 | 7 | 0 | 3 | 164 | 129 | 35 | 14 | 2nd of 6 |
| 1934 | 1st Grade (Fox Memorial) | Marist Old Boys | 13 | 3 | 1 | 9 | 126 | 197 | -71 | 7 | 6th of 6 |
| 1935 | 1st Grade (Fox Memorial) | Marist Old Boys | 12 | 4 | 2 | 6 | 122 | 156 | -34 | 10 | 5th of 7 |
| 1936 | 1st Grade (Fox Memorial) | Marist Old Boys | 14 | 6 | 1 | 7 | 152 | 184 | -32 | 13 | 6th of 8 |
| 1937 | 1st Grade (Fox Memorial) | Marist Old Boys | 14 | 10 | 0 | 4 | 228 | 184 | 44 | 20 | 3rd of 8 |
| 1938 | 1st Grade (Fox Memorial) | Marist Old Boys | 16 | 12 | 0 | 4 | 254 | 121 | 133 | 24 | 1st of 9 |
| 1939 | 1st Grade (Fox Memorial) | Marist Old Boys | 16 | 6 | 0 | 10 | 189 | 126 | 63 | 12 | 8th of 9 |
| 1940 | 1st Grade (Fox Memorial) | Marist Old Boys | 16 | 8 | 0 | 8 | 206 | 206 | 0 | 16 | 5th of 9 |
| 1941 | 1st Grade (Fox Memorial) | Marist Old Boys | 16 | 6 | 1 | 9 | 163 | 287 | -124 | 13 | 7th of 9 |
| 1942 | 1st Grade (Fox Memorial) | Marist Old Boys | 15 | 4 | 0 | 11 | 126 | 237 | -111 | 8 | 6th of 6 |
| 1943 | 1st Grade (Fox Memorial) | Marist Old Boys | 16 | 9 | 1 | 6 | 223 | 150 | 73 | 19 | 4th of 9 |
| 1944 | 1st Grade (Fox Memorial) | Marist Old Boys | 18 | 10 | 2 | 6 | 204 | 114 | 90 | 22 | 4th of 10 |
| 1945 | 1st Grade (Fox Memorial) | Marist Old Boys | 14 | 6 | 1 | 7 | 162 | 148 | 14 | 13 | 6th of 10 |
| 1990 | Cleanaway Division 2 | Marist Saints | 21 | 9 | 2 | 10 | 359 | 475 | 75.58% | 20 | 5th of 8 |
| 1992 | Strand League Premier 2/3 Grading | Marist Saints | 13 | 12 | 1 | 0 | 479 | 118 | 405.93% | 25 | 1st of 14 |
| | Strand League Premier 2 | Marist Saints | 6 | 5 | 0 | 1 | 145 | 46 | 315.22% | 10 | 1st of 7 |
| | Playoffs | Marist Saints | 2 | 1 | 0 | 1 | ? | ? | - | - | W v Hib. Coast in major SF, L v Ellerslie in GF |
| 1993 | Projex Premier 2/3 Grading | Marist Saints | 15 | 13 | 0 | 2 | 621 | 98 | 633.67% | 26 | 2nd of 15 |
| | Projex Premier 2 | Marist Saints | 7 | 6 | 0 | 1 | 259 | 51 | 507.84% | 12 | 1st of 8 |
| | Playoffs | Marist Saints | 2 | 2 | 0 | 0 | 77 | 28 | - | - | W v Hib. Coast 50–12 in major SF, W v Hib Coast 27–16 in GF |
| 1994 | Lion Red Rukutai Shield | Marist Saints | 22 | 8 | 3 | 11 | 457 | 491 | 93.08% | 19 | 8th of 12 |
| 1995 | Lion Red Rukutai Shield | Marist Saints | 24 | 14 | 0 | 10 | 631 | 457 | 138.07% | 32 | *incl 4pts from 2 byes, 3rd of 13 |
| | Playoffs | Marist Saints | ? | ? | ? | ? | ? | ? | ? | ? | |
| 1996 | Lion Red Preliminary Round | Marist Saints | 13 | 5 | 0 | 8 | 244 | 387 | 63.05% | 10 | 11th of 14 |
| | Sharman Cup | Marist Saints | ? | ? | ? | ? | ? | ? | ? | ? | |
| 1997 | Lion Red Super 10 | Marist Saints | 18 | 11 | 1 | 6 | 404 | 401 | 100.75% | 23 | 4th of 10 |
| | Playoffs | Marist Saints | ? | ? | ? | ? | ? | ? | ? | ? | |
| 1998 | Super 10 | Marist Saints | 18 | 11 | 0 | 7 | 489 | 464 | 105.39% | 22 | 3rd of 10 |
| | Playoffs | Marist Saints | ? | ? | ? | ? | ? | ? | ? | ? | |
| 1999 | Rukutai Shield Super 12 | Marist Saints | 22 | 8 | 0 | 14 | 516 | 655 | 78.78% | 16 | 7th of 12 |
| 2000 | Mad Butcher Fox Memorial Top 8 | Marist Saints | 14 | 0 | 2 | 12 | 244 | 477 | 51.15% | 2 | 8th of 8 |
| 2002 | Fox Memorial Top 8 | Marist Saints | 14 | 6 | 2 | 6 | 305 | 294 | 103.74% | 14 | 5th of 8 |
| | Playoffs | Marist Saints | 2 | 1 | 0 | 1 | 47 | 40 | 117.5% | - | W v Mangere East 28–18 in prel. SF, L v Otahuhu in minor SF |
| 2004 | Mad Butcher Fox Memorial | Marist Saints | 14 | 2 | 2 | 10 | 318 | 534 | 59.55% | 6 | 7th of 8 |
| 2020 | Fox Memorial | Marist Saints | 8 | 4 | 0 | 4 | 184 | 238 | 77.31% | 8 | 7th of 12 |
| 2021 | Fox Qualifying | Marist Saints | 11 | 5 | 0 | 6 | 292 | 284 | 102.82% | 10 | 7th of 12 |
| | Fox Memorial | Marist Saints | 7 | 2 | 1 | 4 | 159 | 284 | 55.99% | 5 | 6th of 8 |
| 2022 | Fox Memorial | Marist Saints | 9 | 6 | 0 | 3 | 402 | 166 | 236% | 12 | 5th of 10 in Sect. 2 |
| | Playoffs | Marist Saints | 1 | 0 | 0 | 1 | 0 | 34 | - | - | L v Richmond 0–34 in prel. final |
| 2023 | Fox Qualifiers | Marist Saints | 3 | 3 | 0 | 0 | 98 | 60 | 163.33% | 6 | 1st of 4 |
| | Fox Memorial | Marist Saints | 11 | 5 | 0 | 6 | 250 | 266 | 93.99% | 10 | 6th of 12 |
| | Playoffs | Marist Saints | 1 | 0 | 0 | 1 | 10 | 18 | - | - | L v Howick 10–18 in prel. final |
| 2024 | Fox Qualifiers | Marist Saints | 3 | 1 | 0 | 2 | 64 | 86 | -22 | 2 | 3rd of 4 |
| | Fox Memorial | Marist Saints | 11 | 2 | 2 | 7 | 204 | 320 | -116 | 6 | 10th of 12 |
| 2025 | Fox Qualifiers | Marist Saints | 3 | 2 | 0 | 1 | 132 | 92 | 40 | 4 | 2nd of 4 |
| | Fox Memorial | Marist Saints | 12 | 3 | 0 | 9 | 214 | 374 | -160 | 6 | 8th of 10 |
| 1919-45 + 1994–2004, 2020–2025 | TOTAL | | 660 | 333 | 37 | 289 | 12,364 | 11,310 | +1054 | 699 | |

== Club titles ==
=== Marist Saints grade championships (1919–1944) ===
- 1924 First Grade
- 1927 Sixth Grade knockout competition
- 1930 Fifth Grade and Fifth Grade knockout (v Otahuhu)
- 1931 First Grade, Third Grade Open, Fourth Grade, & Fifth Grade
- 1933 Third Grade Open, & Fourth Grade
- 1934 Third Grade Intermediate
- 1935 Reserve Grade
- 1938 First Grade

=== Other titles ===
- 1928 Roope Rooster & Stormont Shield
- 1929 Roope Rooster & Stormont Shield
- 1932 Roope Rooster & Stormont Shield
- 1937 Roope Rooster & Stormont Shield
- 1939 Roope Rooster
- 1946 Roope Rooster
- 1950 Stormont Shield
- 1958 Roope Rooster & Stormont Shield
- 1965 Stormont Shield
- 1966 Roope Rooster & Stormont Shield
- 1971 Roope Rooster
- 1992 Sharman Cup
- 1997 Roope Rooster

== All time top point scorers (1919–1945) ==
The point scoring lists are compiled from all first grade matches including official preseason games, championship matches, Roope Rooster, Phelan Shield, and Sharman Cup games along with domestic tour matches, games against touring sides such as Australian club teams, and other organised charity and friendly matches. The statistics for the combined Marist-North Shore team of 1942 are also included.

Top point scorers
| No | Player | Start | End | Games | Tries | Con | Pen | DG | Mark | Pts |
|---|---|---|---|---|---|---|---|---|---|---|
| 1 | John Anderson | 1936 | 1945 | 128 | 58 | 148 | 106 | 4 | 0 | 690 |
| 2 | Charles Gregory | 1924 | 1931 | 88 | 13 | 105 | 24 | 0 | 0 | 297 |
| 3 | Hec Brisbane | 1923 | 1934 | 155 | 61 | 3 | 0 | 0 | 0 | 189 |
| 4 | Norm Campbell | 1929 | 1936 | 96 | 12 | 46 | 21 | 2 | 0 | 174 |
| 5 | George Batchelor | 1928 | 1933 | 66 | 47 | 4 | 2 | 0 | 0 | 153 |
| 6 | Arthur Singe | 1921 | 1926 | 46 | 29 | 20 | 11 | 0 | 0 | 149 |
| 7 | Bill Stormont | 1920 | 1924 | 54 | 23 | 20 | 15 | 0 | 4 | 147 |
| 8 | Alan Clarke | 1929 | 1936 | 66 | 15 | 32 | 14 | 1 | 0 | 139 |
| 9 | Jim O'Brien | 1924 | 1930 | 87 | 30 | 18 | 3 | 0 | 1 | 134 |
| 10 | Dave McWilliams | 1940 | 1945 | 86 | 29 | 12 | 3 | 0 | 0 | 117 |
| 11 | Jimmy Matthews | 1938 | 1940 | 56 | 32 | 4 | 3 | 1 | 0 | 112 |
| 12 | Jack Smith | 1940 | 1945 | 42 | 30 | 10 | 0 | 0 | 0 | 110 |
| 13 | Percy Gallagher | 1920 | 1926 | 48 | 35 | 2 | 0 | 0 | 0 | 109 |
| 14 | Gordon Midgley | 1937 | 1940 | 55 | 35 | 0 | 0 | 0 | 0 | 105 |
| 15 | William (Billy) Ghent | 1919 | 1925 | 69 | 20 | 13 | 6 | 0 | 1 | 100 |
| 16 | Bernard Sweeney | 1924 | 1930 | 51 | 33 | 0 | 0 | 0 | 0 | 99 |
| 17 | Morrie Brockliss | 1943 | 1945 | 41 | 3 | 15 | 28 | 0 | 0 | 95 |
| 18= | Jim Johnson | 1922 | 1932 | 130 | 30 | 1 | 0 | 0 | 0 | 92 |
| 18= | Claude List | 1931 | 1934 | 50 | 28 | 3 | 0 | 1 | 0 | 92 |
| 20 | Phil Brady | 1925 | 1932 | 68 | 30 | 0 | 0 | 0 | 0 | 90 |
| 21 | Pat Meehan | 1931 | 1932 | 17 | 23 | 9 | 0 | 0 | 0 | 87 |
| 22 | Lindsay Simons | 1942 | 1944 | 49 | 5 | 13 | 16 | 0 | 0 | 73 |
| 23 | C.M. Stevens | 1922 | 1923 | 26 | 20 | 6 | 0 | 0 | 0 | 72 |
| 24 | George Gardiner | 1924 | 1924 | 13 | 9 | 21 | 1 | 0 | 0 | 71 |
| 25= | John Lang | 1921 | 1924 | 35 | 15 | 6 | 4 | 1 | 0 | 67 |
| 25= | Don McLeod | 1940 | 1945 | 101 | 21 | 1 | 1 | 0 | 0 | 67 |
| 27= | John Bakalich | 1934 | 1938 | 75 | 22 | 0 | 0 | 0 | 0 | 66 |
| 27= | Johnny Simpson | 1941 | 1944 | 32 | 22 | 0 | 0 | 0 | 0 | 66 |
| 29 | Bill Breed | 1936 | 1942 | 86 | 20 | 0 | 0 | 0 | 0 | 60 |
| 30= | Wilf Hassan | 1928 | 1934 | 94 | 18 | 1 | 0 | 0 | 0 | 56 |
| 30= | Bert Schultz | 1930 | 1934 | 41 | 18 | 1 | 0 | 0 | 0 | 56 |

=== Head to Head records ===
Head To Head
| Opponent | Start | End | Games | Wins | Draws | Losses | For | Against |
|---|---|---|---|---|---|---|---|---|
| Maritime | 1919 | 1930 | 28 | 12 | 3 | 13 | 390 | 331 |
| King Country | 1920 | - | 1 | 1 | 0 | 0 | 12 | 6 |
| Hamilton | 1920 | 1923 | 2 | 1 | 0 | 1 | 34 | 42 |
| Māngere United | 1924 | - | 2 | 2 | 0 | 0 | 73 | 8 |
| Marist (Christchurch) | 1925 | - | 1 | 1 | 0 | 0 | 16 | 7 |
| Huntly | 1928 | 1931 | 2 | 1 | 0 | 1 | 22 | 29 |
| South Sydney | 1929 | - | 2 | 1 | 0 | 1 | 15 | 30 |
| Ellerslie United-Otahuhu Rovers | 1931 | - | 2 | 2 | 0 | 0 | 60 | 3 |
| Wellington XIII | 1931 | - | 1 | 1 | 0 | 0 | 40 | 19 |
| Lower Waikato | 1931 | - | 1 | 1 | 0 | 0 | 13 | 11 |
| Eastern Suburbs | 1931 | - | 1 | 1 | 0 | 0 | 14 | 13 |
| Taranaki | 1932 | - | 1 | 0 | 0 | 1 | 17 | 25 |
| Auckland Club XIII | 1932 | - | 1 | 1 | 0 | 0 | 27 | 16 |
| St George | 1933 | - | 1 | 1 | 0 | 0 | 25 | 11 |
| Western Suburbs | 1934 | - | 1 | 0 | 0 | 1 | 19 | 21 |
| TOTAL | 1919 | 1934 | 47 | 26 | 3 | 18 | 777 | 572 |

- the team which beat Eastern Suburbs in 1931 was a combined Marist and North Shore Albions side.

== Gallery ==
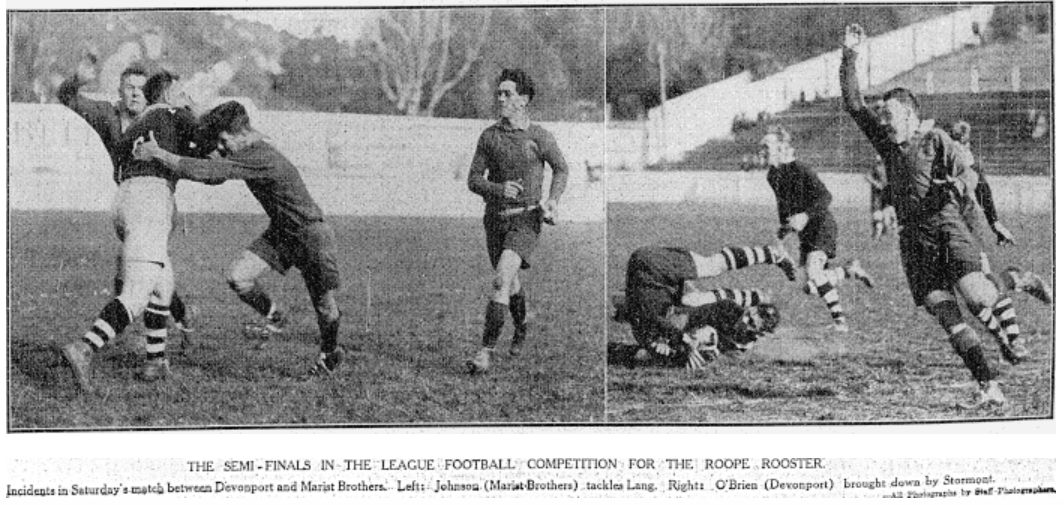
Marist v Devonport in the Roope Rooster semi final at Carlaw Park in 1926.

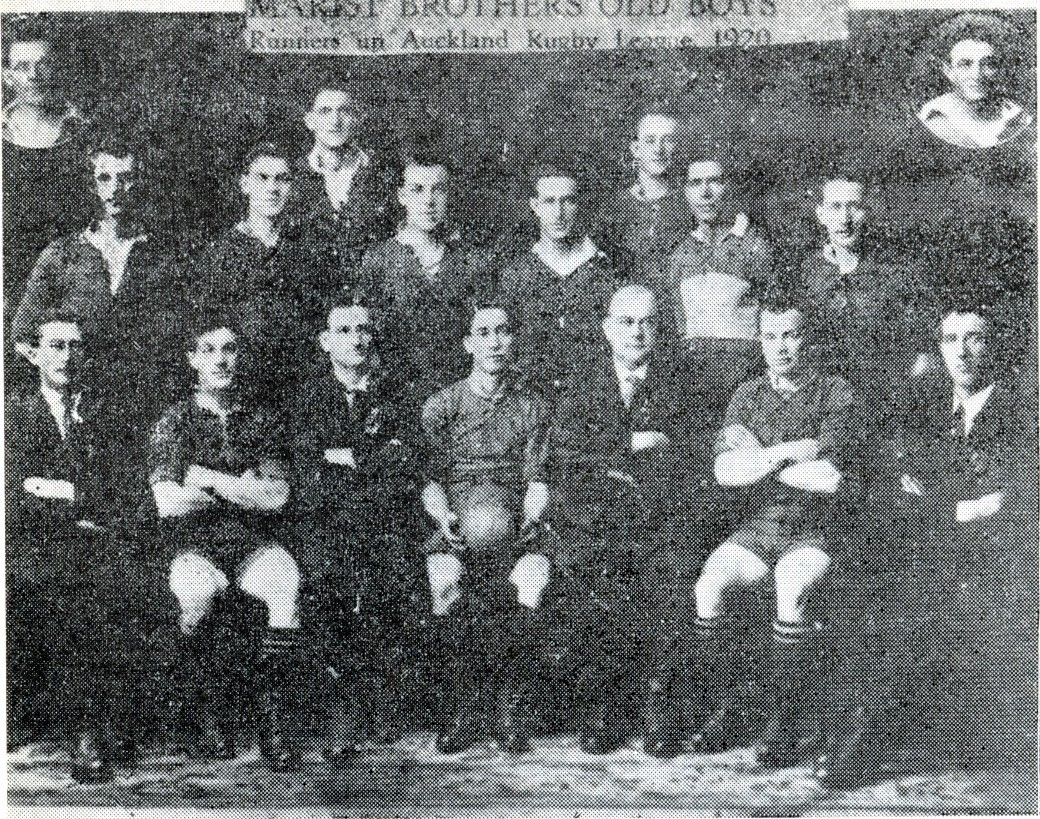
1920 Marist Saints Senior Championship runners up.

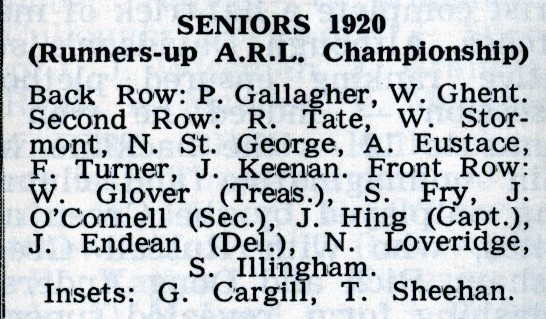

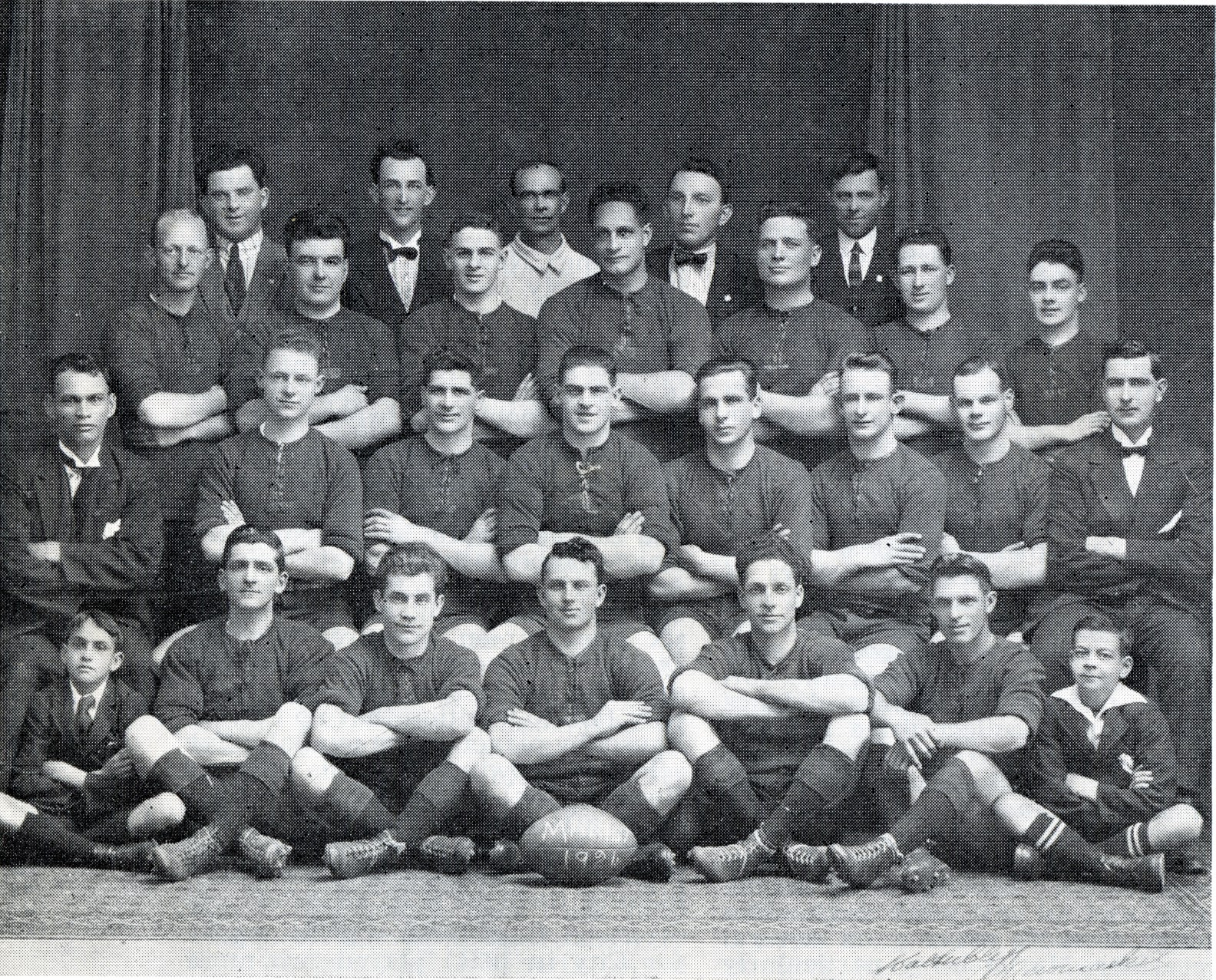
Seniors 1924 Marist Saints Senior Championship Winners.

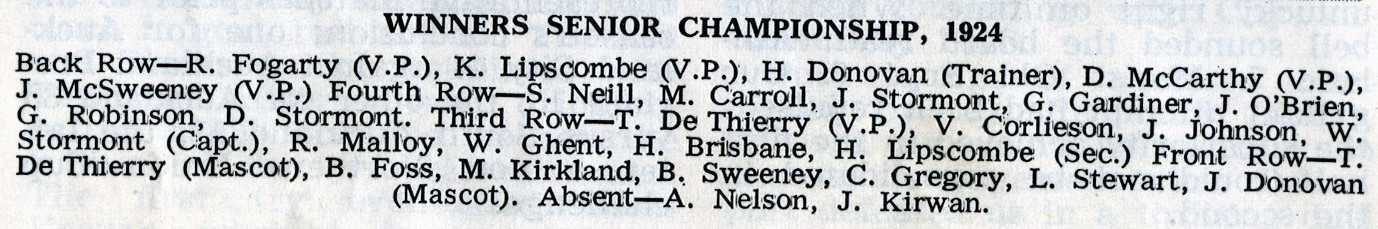

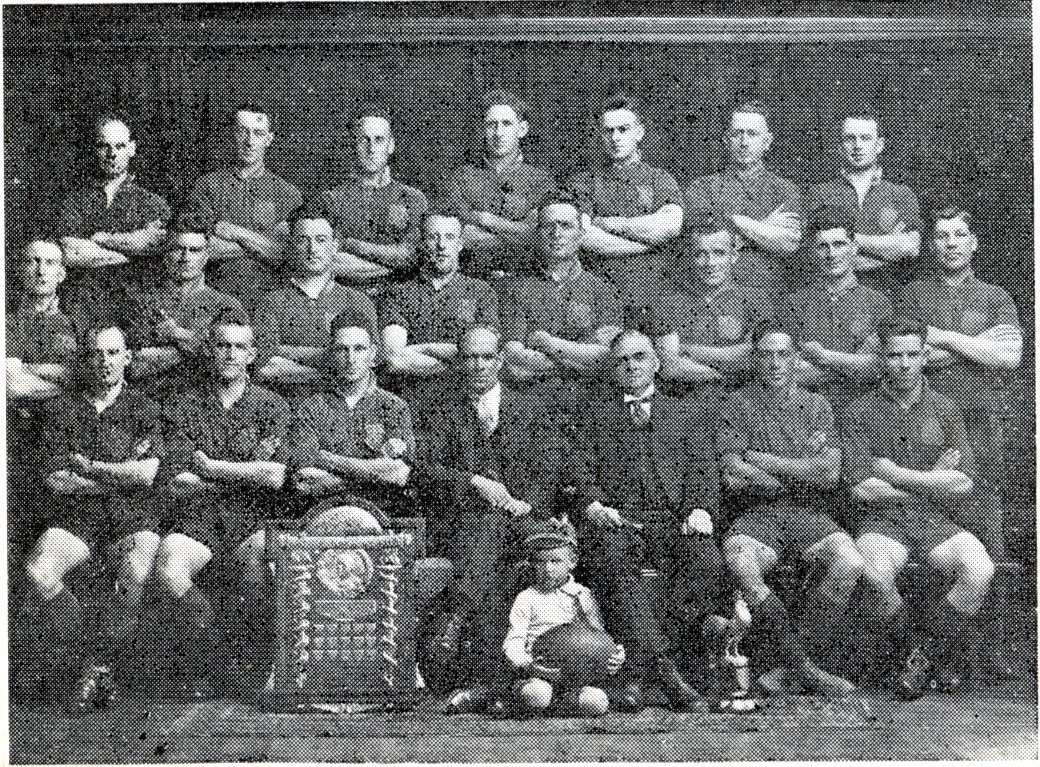
1928 Senior Marist Winners Roope Rooster, Stormont Shield and Labour Day Knockout comp.

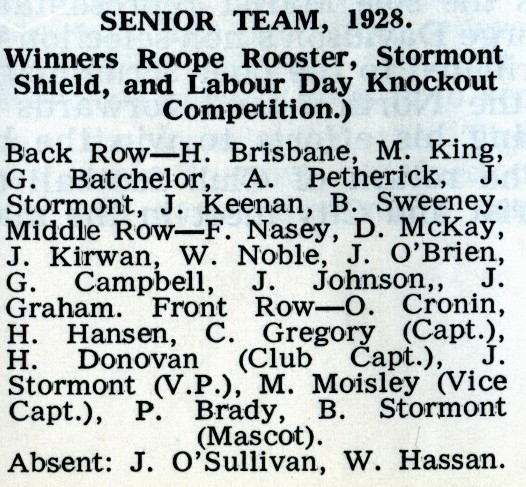

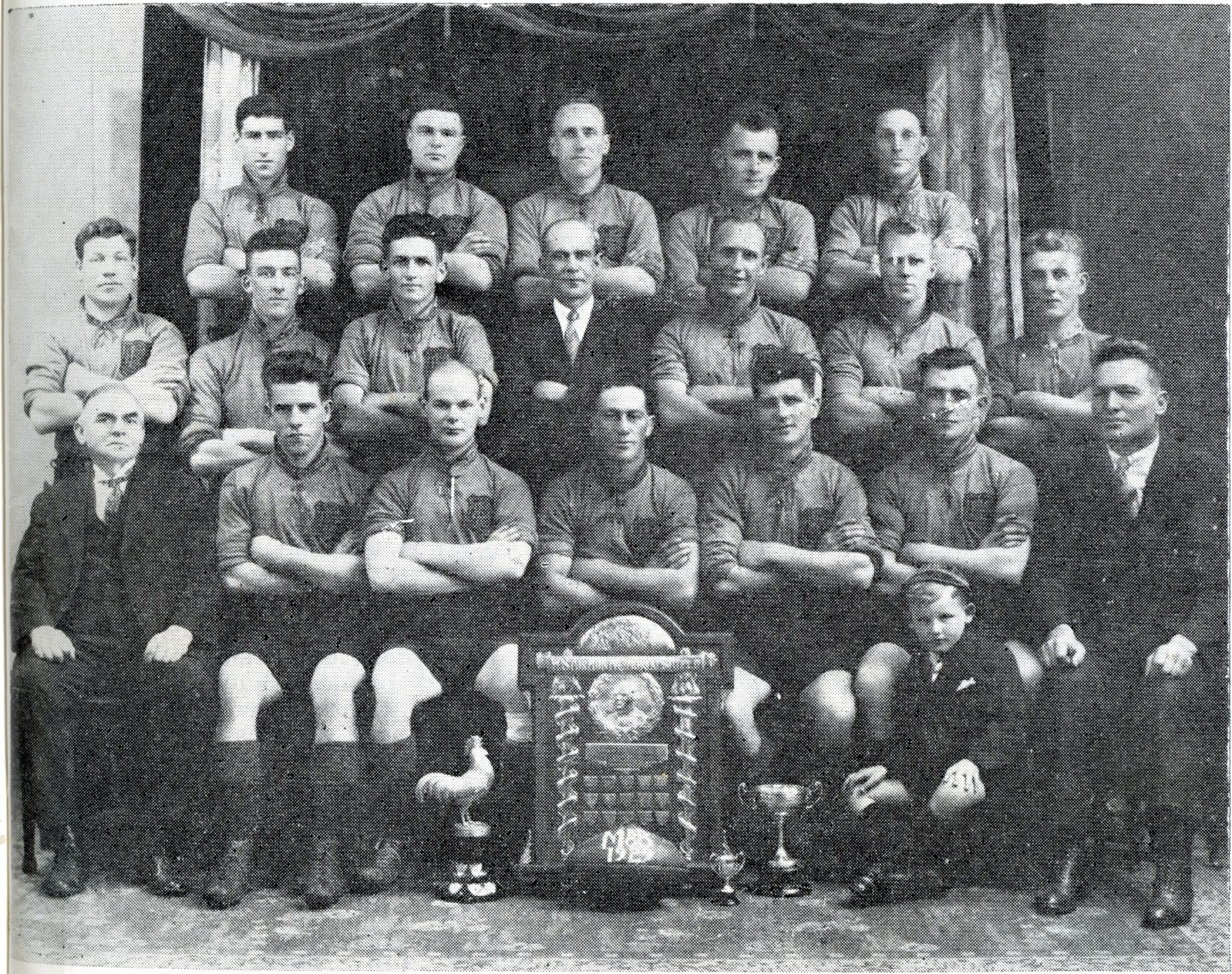
1929 Senior Marist Winners Roope Rooster, Stormont Shield and Thistle Cup.

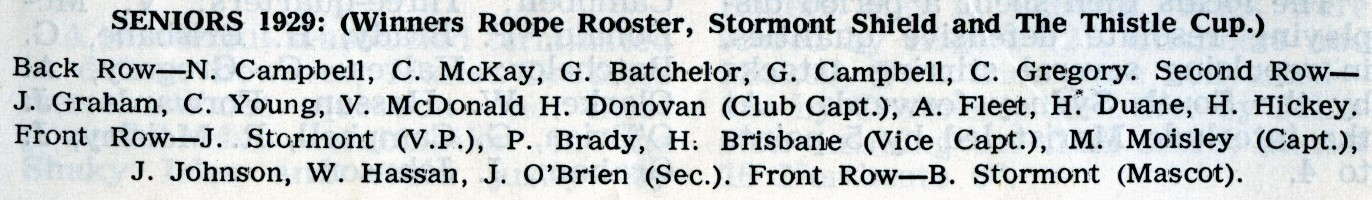

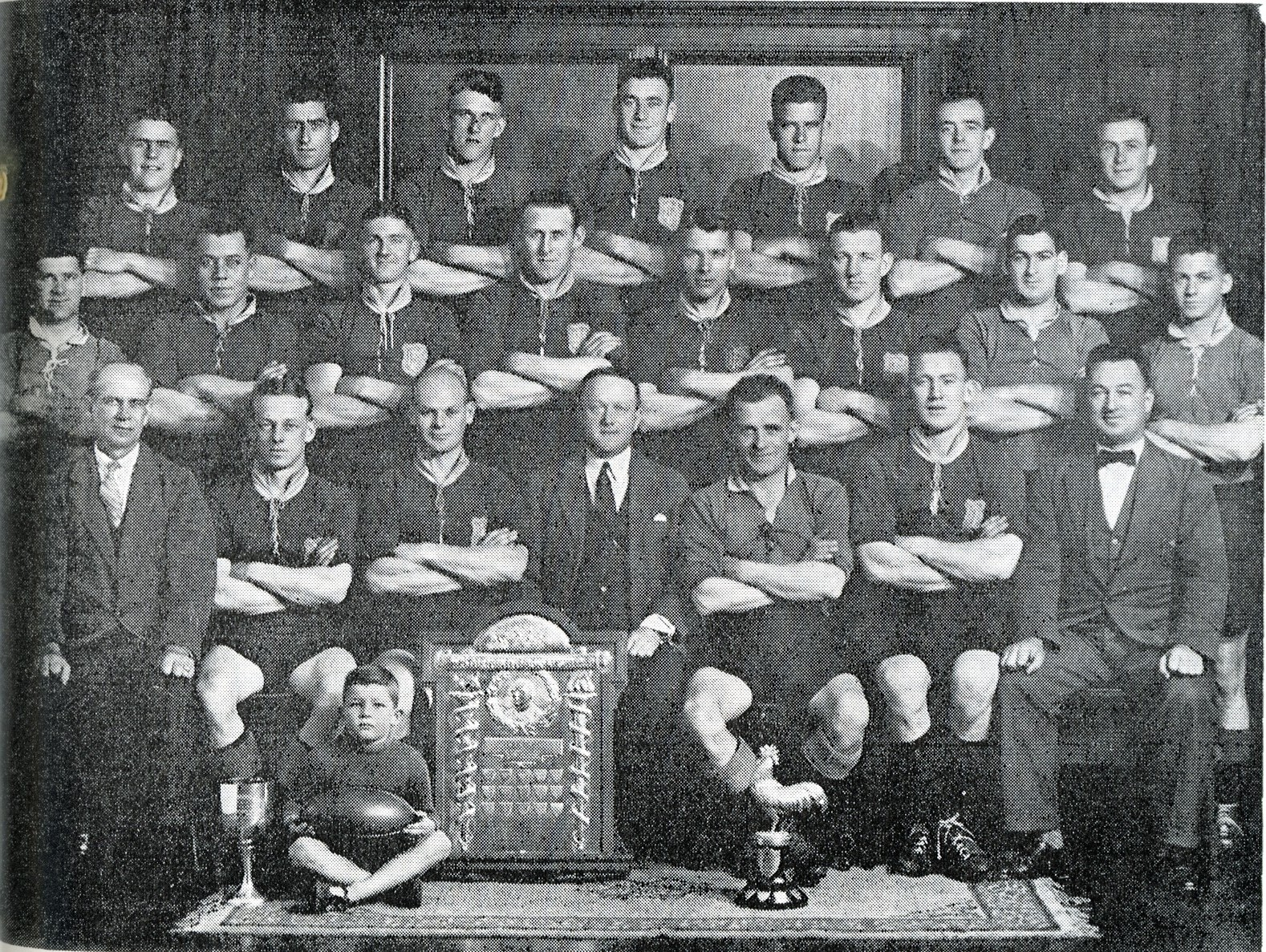
1932 Senior Marist Winners Roope Rooster, Stormont Shield.

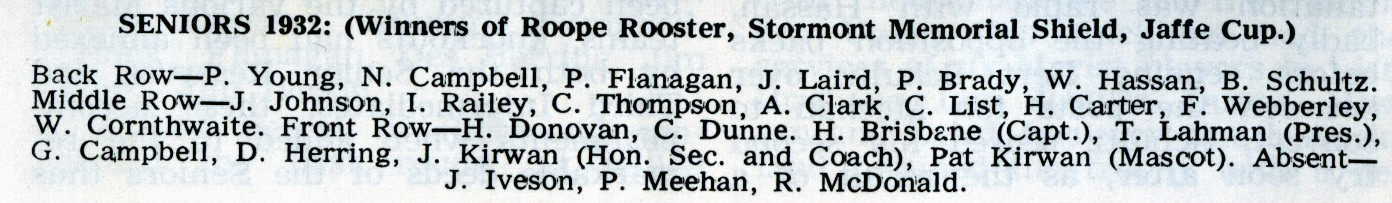

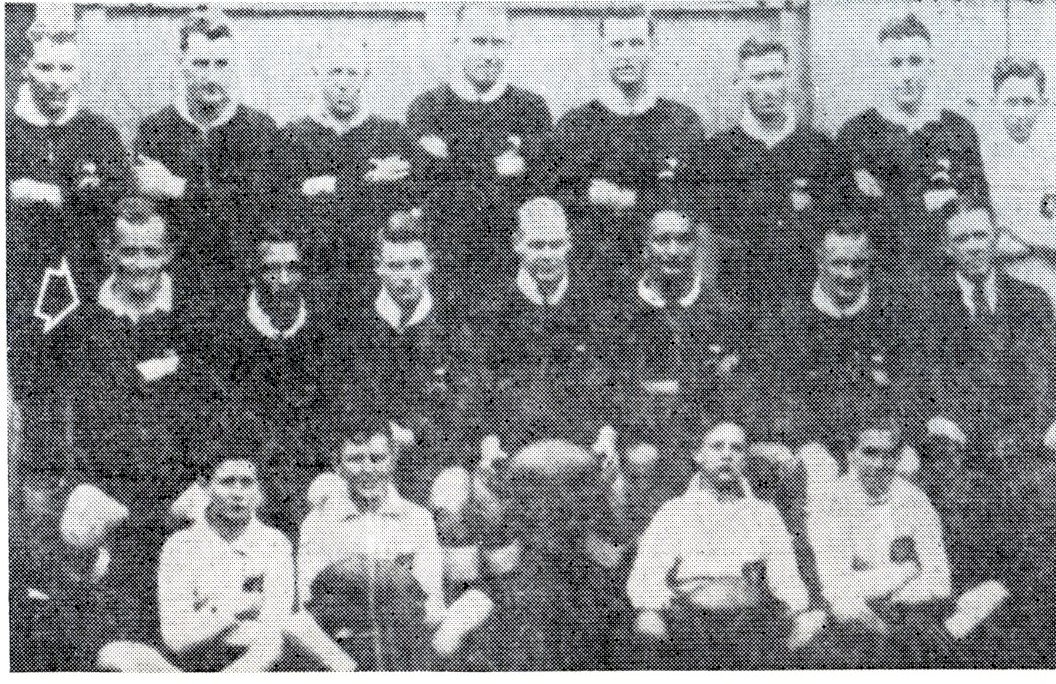

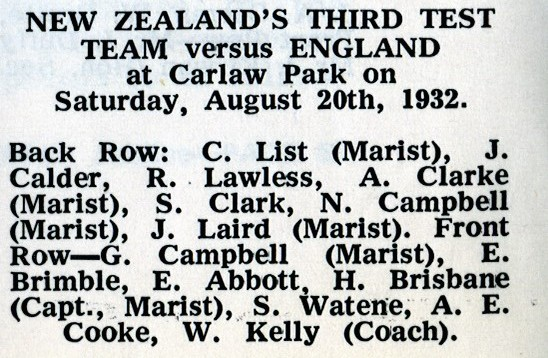

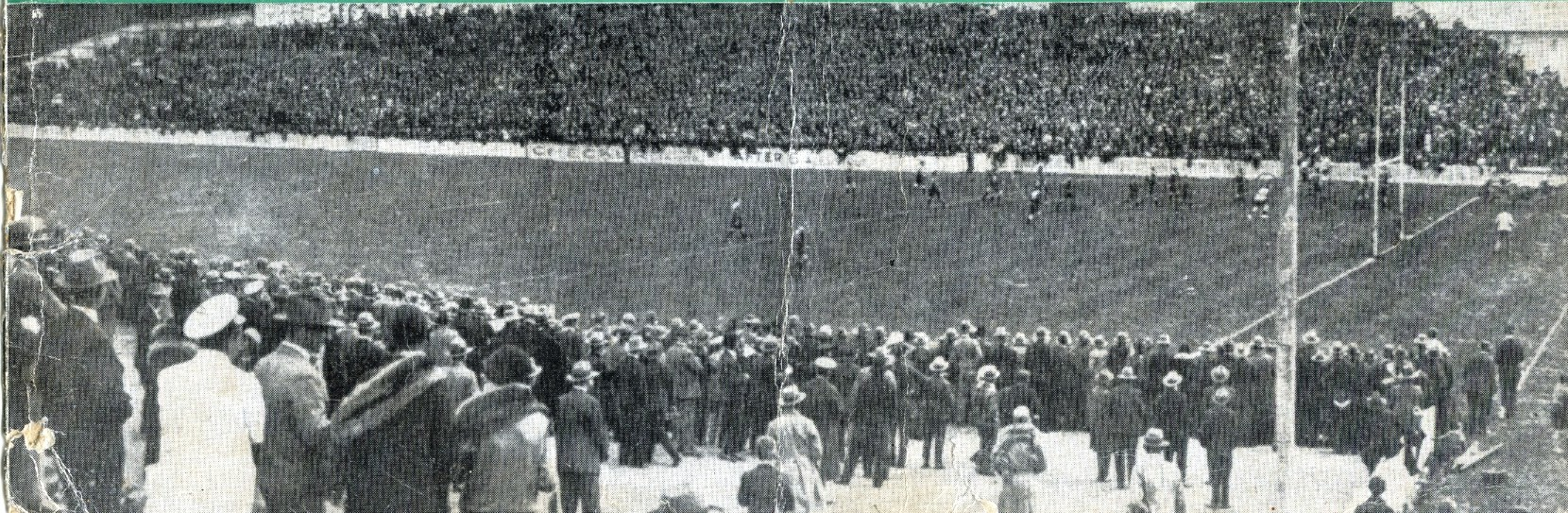
Marist versus South Sydney at Carlaw Park October 12, 1929.
