= 1941 Auckland Rugby League season =

New Zealand rugby league season

The 1941 Auckland Rugby League season was its 33rd.

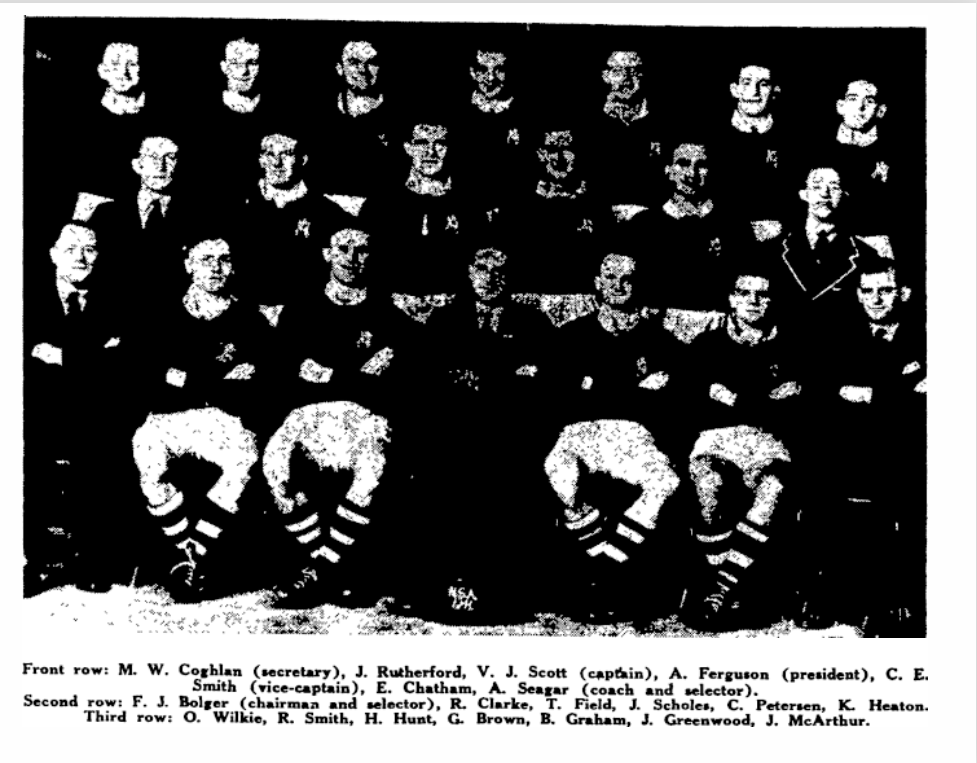

North Shore Albions won the Fox Memorial Shield for the 6th time since their formation in 1909. Their previous titles were in 1913, 1914, 1928, 1932, and 1933. This was to be their last first grade championship title. They finished with a 13 win, 1 draw, 2 loss record for 27 competition points, just one competition point ahead of Manukau. Both teams were well out in front in the title race with Richmond Rovers in 3rd, 8 points behind Manukau.

Manukau did however win the Roope Rooster knockout final when they defeated Ponsonby United 28–10 in the final. This was their second Roope Rooster win, following their 1936 win over City. Mount Albert United won the Phelan Shield for the first time when they beat Richmond 8–7 in the final. The Phelan Shield was competed for between teams who had been knocked out of the Roope Rooster in the early rounds. In the Stormont Shield, champion of champions match between North Shore (first grade winners), and Manukau (Roope Rooster winners) the Onehunga based Manukau side won easily 30–10. This was also the first time Manukau had won the Stormont Shield.

George Mitchell of the Richmond club won the J.F.W. Dickson medal for the most sportsmanlike player, while Ralph Martin, an Otahuhu 5th grade player won the same award for junior players.

The season was extremely disrupted by World War 2 with a huge number of senior grade players in first grade, reserve grade, and the senior B grade going away to fight. As a result, the reserve grade and senior B grade were merged and City Rovers, Newton Rangers, and Papakura unable to field any teams in the grade. Otahuhu Rovers won the senior B grade for the 4th consecutive time, although it was essentially a combined grade with the reserve competition. As a result, they gained admission to the Roope Rooster competition where they beat Papakura in the first round before losing by a point to City Rovers in round 2.

With the war on the representative season was once again relatively short with matches only played within a small geographical area. Auckland Māori played against South Auckland (Waikato) and an Auckland Pākehā side. Auckland played twice against South Auckland, winning both matches. Also a senior B trial match was played between senior and junior affiliated clubs on September 13 and the recently formed New Zealand Old Boys Association played a match against the South Auckland Old Boys at Western Springs in late September.

Preceded by 1940	33rd Auckland Rugby League season 1941	Succeeded by 1942

== Auckland Rugby League News ==
=== Club teams by grade participation ===
There were 84 club teams across 11 grades (including the three schoolboy grades) in the 1941 season which was an increase of one team.

Team	Fox Memorial	Senion B/Reserve Grade	3rd	4th	5th	6th	7th	Sen. Sch. boys	Int. Sch. boys	Jun. Sch. boys	Total
Richmond Rovers	1	1	1	1	1	1	1	0	1	1	9
Ponsonby United	1	1	1	1	0	1	1	1	1	1	9
Point Chevalier	0	1	1	1	2	0	0	1	1	1	8
Mount Albert United	1	1	0	1	0	0	0	1	1	1	6
Ellerslie United	0	1	0	1	1	0	1	1	1	0	6
North Shore Albions	1	1	0	1	0	1	0	0	0	1	5
Northcote & Birkenhead Ramblers	0	1	0	1	0	1	0	1	0	1	5
Papakura	1	0	1	0	1	0	0	0	1	0	4
Newton Rangers	1	0	0	0	0	1	0	1	1	0	4
Otahuhu Rovers	0	1	1	1	0	1	0	0	0	0	4
Green Lane	0	0	1	0	0	0	1	0	1	1	4
Manukau	1	1	0	0	0	0	0	0	0	1	3
City Rovers	1	0	1	1	0	0	0	0	0	0	3
Marist Old Boys	1	0	0	0	0	0	0	0	0	2	3
Avondale	0	0	0	1	0	0	0	1	1	0	3
Newmarket	0	0	0	0	0	0	0	1	1	1	3
R.V.	0	0	0	0	0	0	0	1	1	1	3
Glenora	0	0	1	0	0	0	0	0	0	1	2
Total	9	9	8	10	5	6	4	9	11	13	84

=== Season prospects ===
The Auckland Rugby League held a special meeting on March 13. It was indicated that the competitions would carry on as usual and be successful “in spite of many players being in the fighting forces”. The chairman, Mr. G. Grey Campbell said that “last season was easily the best experienced for many years, as the annual report would show, and already several clubs were mustering their forces in anticipation of another good year... it is pleasing to know that progress during the past three years has been marked, and every thanks is due to the excellent co-operation of the players and all officials, even down to the ball boys. The enthusiasm shown in club competition was remarkable and the public gave most generous support”. They then decided to hold their annual meeting on April 2.

=== Annual meeting ===
Their 31st Annual Meeting was held at the League Rooms in the Grey Buildings, Courthouse Lane on Wednesday, April 2 at 7.45pm. Remarkably despite the disruption caused by the war the 1940 season had turned out to be a record year for revenue for Auckland Rugby League. Revenue from gates and the grandstand were £4370 which was the highest ever. This allowed £1885 to be transferred to the appropriation account, compared with £1537 in 1939. “Liberal expenditure was allowed for maintenance, £218 was paid to injured players, and grants amounting to £705 were made to clubs”. A benefit match for the injured players’ fund realised £169. The league also raised £398 for “patriotic purposes”, and £198 was granted to the Sports’ Queen fund. The “total assets of the league were £10,853, and a reserve had been created for expenses of a capital nature likely to occur during the coming season”. It was stated that 800 players competed in the junior grades and there were 38 teams in the schoolboy competition. The ladies committee was also referred to in the annual report. They held many functions and from these donated £161 to patriotic funds, and £64 to the injured players fund and “also assisted several patriotic organisations”. At the meeting president John A. Lee spoke, saying “in spite of the war conditions, so satisfactory a balance-sheet speaks volumes for the excellent spirit which prevailed last year... the league code has gone from success to success, and in the forces fighting in the Middle East, league players are doing well in the rugby union fifteens”. Chairman C. Grey Campbell said “in days of stress ahead the management would rally round any deserving war cause... [and] the future was very uncertain from a playing point of view, but the speaker had no hesitation in saying that the right thing was to carry on doing a part in New Zealand affairs as a sports organisation. It was far better that the public should be occupied in their thoughts away from the tragic happenings in England. The game's players, officials and supporters were behind the government and the people of Britain in their great struggle”. The following officers were elected at the meeting:- Patron, Mr. J.B. Donald; vice patron, Mr. J.F.W. Dickson; president, Mr. John A. Lee, M.P., vice presidents, the Mayor, Sir Ernest Davis, Messrs. J. Donald, C. H. Drysdale, H. Grange, R.J. Laird, W.J. Lovett, E. Morton, F. W. Schramm, M.P., W. Wallace, H.W. Brien, L. Coakley, H. Luke, R. D. Bagnall, E. Montgomery, T.G. Symonds, G.T. Wright, R.H. Wood, H. Walmesley, Joe Sayegh, R.H. Benson, A. Moody, H. W. Gray, J. C. Gleeson, B. Brigham, N. Kyle; trustees, Messrs. G. Grey Campbell, Edward John Phelan, A. Stormont; auditor, Mr. R.A. Spinley; hon. solicitor Mr. H.M. Rogerson; hon. physicians, Drs. M.G. Pezaro, S. Morris, K.H. Holdgate, J.N. Waddell, G.W. Lock, H. Burrell, H. Smith; board of control, Messrs. G. Grey Campbell (chairman), Edward John Phelan, William Mincham, V. Rose, R. Doble, T. Davis, J.W. Probert, T. Wilson, Jim Clark, J.F. Knowling (treasurer), Ivan Culpan (secretary); finance committee, Messrs. J.W. Probert, T. Wilson, William Mincham; delegate to New Zealand Rugby League, Mr. R. Doble. At the meeting a framed photograph of the board of control was presenting by Mr. J. A. Lee to chairman Mr. C. Grey Campbell.

=== Communication with English rugby league ===
It was decided at a meeting early in the season to send a message of support to the English rugby league which was endeavouring to carry on its operations in spite of the war. They had “expressed deep appreciation and admiration of the magnificent courage of the English people”. It was reported in the New Zealand Herald on April 12 that the English Rugby League replied: “our heartfelt thanks for your inspiring message. We are playing football: we are cheerful; we will ever be strong”.

=== Amalgamation and suspension of the reserve grade ===
At the annual meeting on April 2 the possibility of amalgamating some senior clubs was discussed with delegates being asked to keep an open mind on the idea. It was decided to suspend the senior reserve grade competition for the 1941 season. They also planned a series of preliminary games on Saturday, April 19 to see first hand the playing strength of the senior clubs, so they could then finalise the details regarding the senior grade competition. At the board of control meeting on April 23 Mr. J. Rutledge of the City Rovers club suggested that “the stronger clubs give their strength to the weaker clubs, and then you would have a better balanced competition”. The City, Newton and Papakura clubs had all been in conference with the league about their prospects for the season after having struggled somewhat in recent time. Chairman Campbell remarked that there might be some merit in the suggestion. Richmond Rovers was named by Rutledge as a club in particular that had a lot of strength.

=== Huntly teams desire to join the Auckland competition ===
At the board of control meeting on April 16 the Huntly club sent a deputation to ask about entering a team in the senior championship. Mr. W.C. Davies, the South Auckland Rugby League's chairman spoke on their behalf and said they “desired to play matches at Carlaw park and at Huntly on alternate Saturday's and the clubs were not concerned with gate receipts” at Carlaw Park. Auckland Rugby League's deputy-chairman, Mr. E. J. Phelan said that the clubs had already discussed the issue and had raised many questions and difficulties. Mr. F. T. McAneny, chairman of the senior clubs’ officers’ association said “the general impression of his executive was that the scheme was a wartime measure, but, judging from the remarks of members of the deputation, their idea was a permanent one. Auckland clubs... had a strong objection to playing what appeared to be a fully representative South Auckland (northern Waikato) team,... and the question of transport was also a matter to consider”. Phelan said that in the absence of chairman Campbell no final decision could be made until after their meeting the following week. In mid May the South Auckland (northern Waikato) wrote to the ARL “expressing its intention of inviting Auckland senior clubs to play matches at Huntly”. The secretary, Ivan Culpan, was advised by the ARL board to advise all clubs of the offer for when they had their byes. Richmond and North Shore had already travelled to Davies Park in Huntly to play local sides.

=== Senior competitions ===
At the meeting on April 23 it was decided to make no alteration to the senior teams from the previous season and to decline the applications from Huntly and Otahuhu to enter sides. It was “resolved that senior clubs with teams in the senior B competition be allowed to draw on senior B players, provided the players concerned do not participate in three consecutive games, or five at intervals, in the second round of the competition. Richmond reported that their senior team was unable to obtain a supply of the club coloured jerseys, and permission was given to them to wear white jerseys and pants, and maroon stockings in place of their usual maroon and blue.

=== Protest by Otahuhu ===
In early May the Otahuhu club wrote a letter of protest to the Auckland Rugby League regarding their non-acceptance of their senior team. They “made suggestions that a fairer method of selection be devised in future. The letter pointed out that the Otahuhu club was in a position to field a strong team at the start of the season, but since then senior clubs in the city had made Otahuhu a recruiting ground”.

=== Junior competitions ===
There were fifty three team nominations for junior sides received by the Auckland Rugby League when nominations closed in late April. It was then decided to commence the season on May 10.

=== Carlaw Park and other grounds ===
On the afternoon of January 16 a grass fire on the railway embankment threatened the railway grandstand before it was extinguished by fire fighters from the central fire station. Only slight damage was caused to the advertising hoardings behind the stand. Carlaw Park was being used regularly for military activities after the Auckland Rugby League having granted its use to the army in 1940 with the first Battalion, Auckland Regiment parading there in January. Indeed, the ground during the summer of 1940-41 saw the ground and facilities being loaned out to “various bodies and letters of thanks were read [at a meeting on March 13] from the military authorities, the New Zealand Red Cross Society, the Patrotic Sports committee, and Home Guard units”. At the annual meeting on April 2 chairman Campbell announced that the lease for Carlaw Park had been extended by 21 years. It was also reported at the meeting that Carlaw Park would not be available for night training “owing to the blackout regulations” but “other arrangements, however, were being made”. Chairman Campbell said that training could take place “between the hours of 5 p.m. and 7.30 p.m.” and a suggestion was made that a “well-known gymnasium might be taken over for physical training”. Whilst many teams had their own grounds in the outer suburbs and could train at them, City Rovers, Ponsonby United, Marist Old Boys, and Newton Rangers all relied on Carlaw Park for the majority of their training. On April 5 they were all scheduled to train on the same day with Newton allocated the No. 1 ground from 2 pm to 3:30 pm, Ponsonby No. 1 from 3:30 to 5 pm, Marist No. 2 from 2pm to 3:30 pm, and City No. 2 from 3:30 to 5pm. As in previous times, soldiers, sailors, and airmen were admitted to the ground free of charge along with children. On match days special trams ran from Customs Street to Carlaw Park. In May the Auckland Council advised that the following grounds had been allocated for rugby league for the season: Auckland Domain (2), Outer Domain (1), Victoria Park (1), Walker Park (2), Western Springs (1), Grey Lynn (1).

In June the Mount Albert club requested that the league consider improving the lighting in the dressing rooms at Carlaw Park and the league agreed to the request.

In September Opai Asher, the custodian of Carlaw Park had his handcart stolen and smashed up. After not being able to find it in the morning he searched up into the Auckland Domain and "spied what looked like a heap of wood. It was the remains of the handcart, upside down, absolutely dismantled, with the wheels, springs and axle missing". The police were left to look into the matter.

At the June 25 ARL meeting the Newton club “drew attention to the lack of protection afforded players through goal posts on suburban grounds not being properly padded. Many injuries had been reported during the last few Saturdays as the result of crashing against the posts”. The league decided to take the issue up with the local bodies involved. It was reported that the Auckland City Council's parks and reserve committee that “provided the necessary equipment was available, the groundsmen would attend to the requirements”.

=== Tenders for refreshment rights and programme rights ===
On April 5 the Auckland Rugby League put out a tender advertisement in the Auckland newspapers. It asked for tenders for “Refreshment Rights” for Carlaw Park, and “Programme Rights” for the 1941 season with it stated that the highest or any tender not necessarily accepted”.

=== Auckland representative team ===
In April Hec Brisbane notified the league that due to “private reasons” he would not be able to offer his services as a selector this year. The ARL then appointed Bill Cloke, Dougie McGregor, and Stan Prentice as selectors for the season.

=== Old Boys club rooms ===
On June 14 the Rugby League Old Boys’ Association opened its “newly established” club rooms on Great North Road in the evening with nearly 200 in attendance. The opening ceremony was performed by Mr. John A. Redwood, the president of New Zealand Rugby League. The club rooms were large and contained 2 full sized billiard tables, 2 indoor bowling greens, reading rooms, and with photographs around the walls of “historic events since the inception of league football in Auckland”. Those who spoke at the opening included ARL chairman C Grey Campbell, president John A. Lee, and Steve Watene who was chairman of the Māori Control Board. The secretary of the club was Mr. William Opie and he said that one of the objectives of the club was to give assistance to “old players of the league game who were financially embarrassed”. During the evening “use was made of the recreation facilities of the club, Clark McConachy, New Zealand billiards champion figuring in an exhibition of billiards and snooker in association with E.V. Roberts, a former New Zealand champion and Craddock Dufty, of full back fame, respectively”. Toasts were offered for “the King”, “Absent Friends”, “Parent Bodies”, and “Visitors Club Rooms Opened/League Old Boys.

=== Ladies Committee ===
On July 2 the Auckland Rugby League Ladies Social Committee held a dance at the Peter Pan Cabaret. The evening featured “modern and old-time dancing” from 8 to 12pm. It “attracted a crowded attendance” with guests including Ivan Culpan, the secretary of Auckland Rugby League and chairman Campbell. The proceeds from the dance were to be “divided between the injured players’ fund and the sick benefit of the ladies’ committee. The committee was:- Mrs. I Stonex, Mrs. C. Howe, Mrs. Chernside, Mrs. R. Doble and Mrs. A Scott (secretary). On August 20 the board thanked the ladies committee for a donation of £25 for the injured players fund.

=== Players in military service and military related news ===
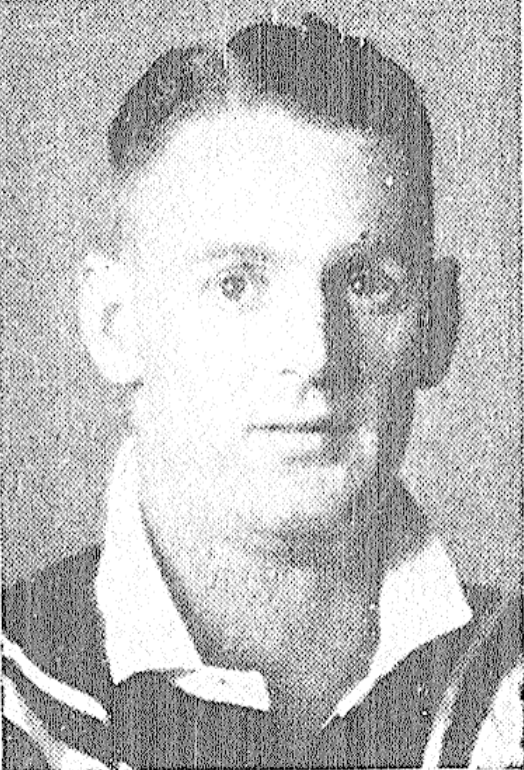
Laurie Mills

It was reported on June 21 that three former senior players were reported safe and back in the Middle East after “participating in the Greece and Crete campaigns. They were Laurie Mills, Trevor Bramley, and J. Vernall who had all played for the Richmond senior side, with Mills and Bramley meeting up on the same transport in a “hurried evacuation”. Bramley had played in several army games in Cairo and had won the General Freyberg Medal for being part of a New Zealand unit which won a seven-a-side rugby tournament. Mills was later killed in battle.

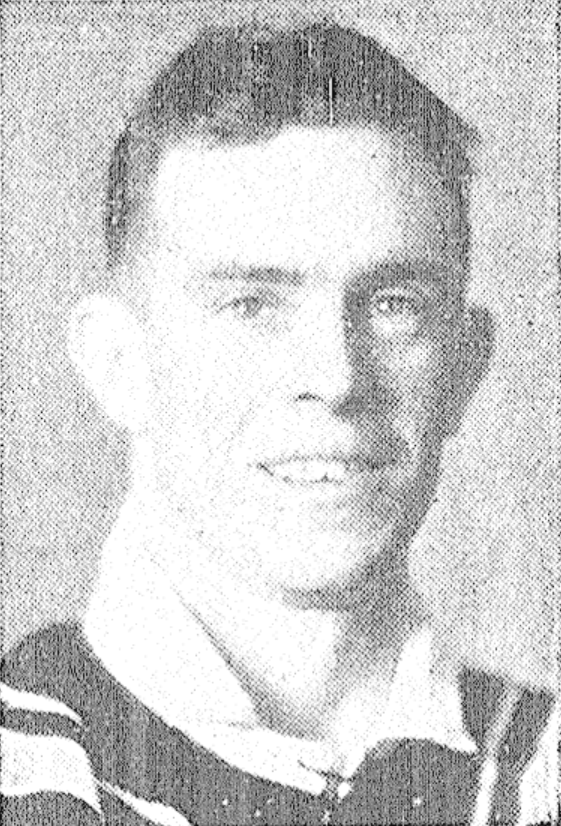
Jack Campbell

Jack Campbell who had played for Ponsonby senior side in 1938 before transferring to Christchurch was reported missing after serving in Greece and being evacuated to Crete. Around the same time Ivor Stirling was also reported missing in the Middle East. Both players were part of the same unit. Stirling had played for the North Shore Albions in 1937 and 38. He ultimately survived the war and his son Ken Stirling also represented New Zealand at rugby league while his daughter Glenda Stirling represented New Zealand at the 1968 Summer Olympics and 1970 British Commonwealth Games.

Prior to round 9 on July 5 both Verdun Scott of North Shore and Arthur McInnarney of Mount Albert departed to join up to camps at Trentham and Papakura respectively. It was reported on July 7 that Private H. A. Meyer of the Point Chevalier club was a prisoner of war. On July 12 it was reported that Lance-corporal H. R. McKinnon was missing. He had played “for the Richmond club for over ten years, from schooldays to his enlistment, when he was playing senior grade”. On July 26 it was reported that Martin Hansen, the captain of the Mount Albert team had returned from the war. He fought in Egypt and was evacuated from Greece. While overseas he saw other Auckland league players W. Walker (Mount Albert), Trevor Bramley and Laurie Mills (Richmond), Noel Martin and Dan Klane (Ponsonby). The latter two were now prisoners of war. Hansen had been wounded and spent time in a Scottish hospital before moving to another hospital and then returning to New Zealand.

With several players in the army in the Wellington area it was asked who the players would return to if they played league for various Wellington clubs while on service. “it was eventually decided, subject to approval of the New Zealand Rugby League, that any players on active service are free to play for any club without registration, but upon return to Auckland on military leave the player must revert back to his former club”.

In August the league donated £75 to the Fighters’ Mother Fund and the Auckland Trotting Club wrote a letter expressing their appreciation for the donation on behalf of the Allied Sports Gymkhana.

=== Representative fixtures ===
Auckland decided to play South Auckland on July 12 after a request from their southern neighbours. Mr. W. C. Davies, secretary of the South Auckland League also requested a higher percentage of the gate receipts as the gate percentages offered to his team had been gradually reduced over time. They felt that 40% was a reasonable request after amusement taxes were deducted especially after their “fine showing” in their last two matches. After a discussion in committee, chairman Campbell told the deputation that the request would be granted. Mr. T. Shaw of Huntly said that their fans in the Lower Waikato were looking forward to seeing an Auckland team in action.

=== Obituaries ===
==== Walter Roland Clarke ====
It was reported in May that former Papakura senior player, Gunner Walter Roland Clarke was killed in action on April 15 as part of an anti-tank unit. Clarke was the first Papakura player killed in action in the war. He had been educated at Papakura District School and as well as playing for the Papakura senior side in the forwards he was also a “keen supporter of the Papakura Greyhound Racing Club”. Before enlisting in the military he had been working as a grocer's assistant driving the mail and grocers van. Clarke enlisted in 1940 with the second Echelon and spent 7 months in England before moving to Egypt. He was aged just 24 at the time of his death.

==== John David Campbell Long ====
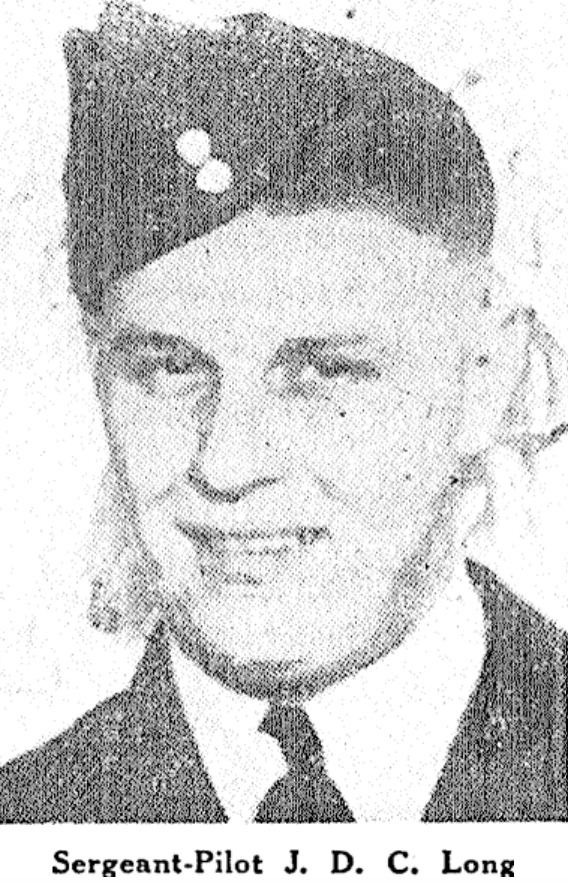

John David Campbell Long was killed on May 11, 1941, after having initially been reported missing in action. He was a player in the Avondale 3rd grade side. Long had joined the Royal New Zealand Air Force and trained at the Levin and Ohakea stations before leaving for the war on April 26, 1940. His last rank was Sergeant (Rear Gunner). He had been educated at Owairaka Primary School and Mount Albert Grammar School before becoming employed at the Otahuhu Railway Workshops. He was just 21 years of age when he was killed. His name is on the Otahuhu Railway Workshops War Memorial on the corner of Piki Thompson Way in Ōtāhuhu, Auckland.

==== George Gardiner ====
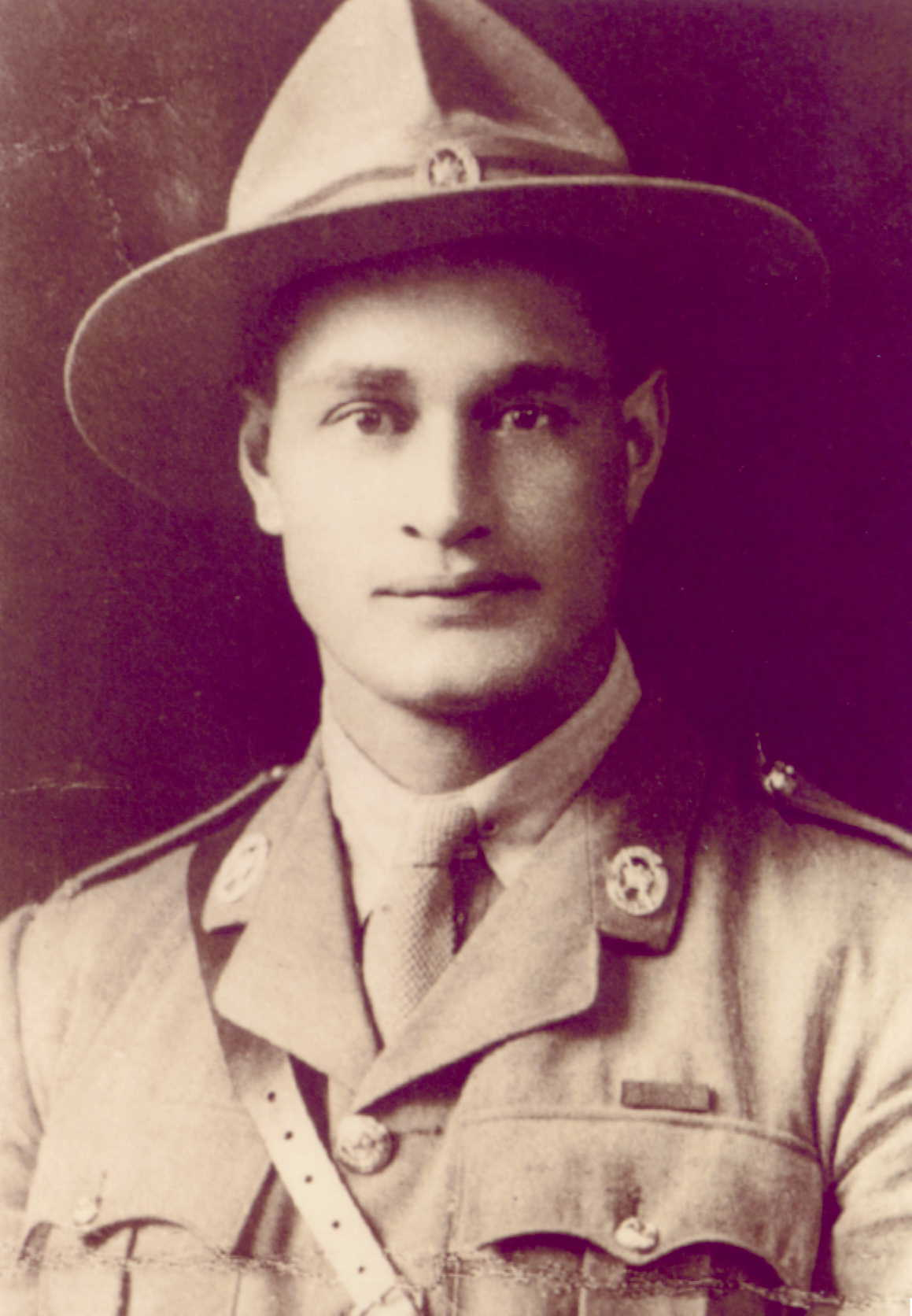
George Gardiner

On May 17 George Gardiner was killed in action in Tobruk. Gardiner had played rugby league for New Zealand on 21 occasions and represented Marist Old Boys in 1924, and Ponsonby United from 1925 to 1932. He also played 4 matches for Auckland in 1924–25, and one for Auckland Province in 1925. After his rugby league career finished he moved to Australia and enlisted in the army there aged over 40 using a fake age as he was 'too old' to enlist, after having earlier fought in World War 1 also using a fake age as he had been too young at that time. He was part of the Australian 2/23rd Battalion and left for the Middle East in November 1940. In early 1941 a German advance in Libya pushed British and Commonwealth forces back towards the Egyptian border. In “the early hours of 17 May the 2/23rd Battalion participated in an unsuccessful attempt to recapture the lost ground”. They made some gains but most of the Australian attacking forces were forced back and they suffered heavy casualties. After the operation there were 95 Australians reported missing including Gardiner amongst six other officers. There were conflicting reports of what had happened to him including him being taken to a hospital in Egypt, or that he had been captured. It was later determined after an inquiry that he had been shot “through the abdomen and died of his wounds the day after the battle”. His death occurred in fighting at Cyrenaica near Tobruk with the cause of death recorded as peritonitis. George Gardiner was buried in the Knightsbridge War Cemetery in Acroma, 30 km (19 mi) west of Tobruk in Libya.

On May 13, 1942, the Bay of Plenty Times published an obituary for George Gardiner. On 10 April 2016 the Australian War Memorial held a ceremony to commemorate Lieutenant George Gardiner's life and service. Gardiner was survived by his wife Mary Gardiner and a son, Parata Ngatai Gardiner.

==== Walter Gamble Mulholland ====
On August 2, Walter Gamble Mulholland died aged 58. He was a former secretary of Newton Rangers and secretary of the Auckland Rugby League Referees’ Association in 1909–10.

==== Bernard George Evans ====
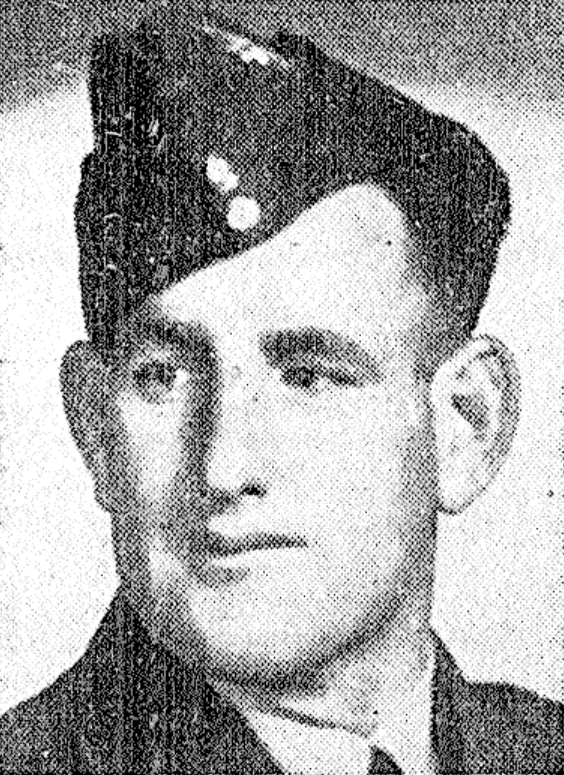
Sergeant Bernard George Evans

It was reported in mid August that 25 year old North Shore senior player Bernard "Bunny" George Evans had been killed “in the course of air operations”. He had been born at Takapuna and educated at Takapuna Grammar School before playing rugby union for Takapuna Rugby Club. He moved to Sydney and joined the rugby league code and then returned to New Zealand. He then joined the North Shore Albions and played at least 7 senior games for them in 1940, scoring 4 tries and kicking 2 goals. He was also a cyclist competing in Takapuna events and a member of the Takapuna junior surf club. He had volunteered into the Air Force early in 1940 and after spending six months preliminary training at Levin and Ohakea he left for Scotland to complete his training as an air gunner. Details of his death later revealed that the aircraft he was on was attacked on its way back to base on the night of August 13–14. Wing Commander and New Zealander, Trevor Owen Freeman wrote he “immediately returned the fire and succeeded in beating off the first three attacks, but on the fourth attack an unlucky bullet from the enemy fatally injured him. Although your son was a comparatively new member of the squadron he was already very popular, and we will miss him greatly. He died gloriously in the service of the empire, maintaining to the end the highest traditions of the Royal Air Force”.

==== Robert Arthur Spinley ====
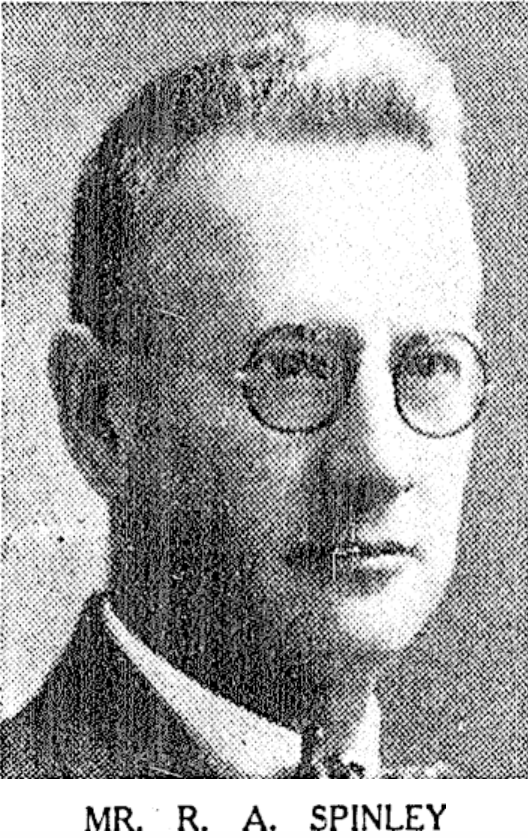

On August 29 Mr. Robert Arthur Spinley died suddenly at home at the age of 53. He was the secretary of Auckland Rugby League from 1914 to 1918 being "closely involved with the formation of Carlaw Park", and auditor from 1920 to 1941 and was closely involved with the formation of Carlaw Park. He was born in Devonport and was also involved with the North Shore Rowing Club and North Shore Golf Club. Spinley was a prominent accountant and was the former president of the New Zealand Accountants and Auditors’ Association. He was also auditor for "a large number of sporting bodies on the North Shore and elsewhere in Auckland". Spinley was also the secretary of the Reform Party in the Waitemata electorate and later the electoral secretary to Mr. A. Harris, former member for the constituency. He was survived by his wife, Margaret Clara Spinley (nee. Rowe).

==== William Robert Dil ====
On September 21 William Robert Dil of Birkenhead, Auckland was killed in action. He was a sergeant in the Royal New Zealand Air Force and part of the 101 Squadron. Dil had trained at Levin, Harewood, and Woodbourne before leaving to Canada in April 1940. He died from injuries which he received in air operations over England. Dil was born in New Plymouth and educated at Birkenhead Primary School and Northcote High School, before later studying at Auckland Teachers’ Training College, and Auckland University College. He had been posted to the staff of Birkenhead School at the time he enlisted. Dil was a player for the Northcote and Birkenhead Ramblers rugby league club as well as being a “prominent table tennis player”, and a member of the Piha Surf Club. He was aged 22 and was buried at the Cambridge City Cemetery in England.

==== Hugh McLennan Macdonald ====
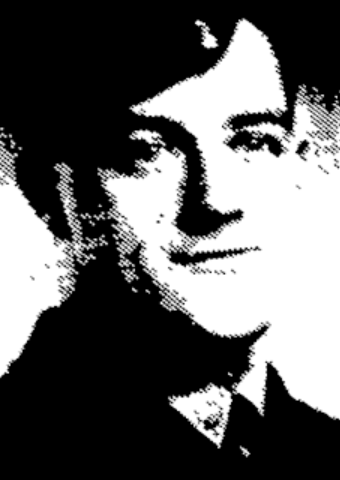
Hugh McLennan Macdonald

Ponsonby United reserve grade player Hugh McLennan MacDonald was reported missing during air operations on September 28 and it was later confirmed that he had died on September 29 in the Netherlands. He had been born in Fairlie, South Canterbury, in 1918 and was educated at Curran Street School and later the Seddon Memorial Technical College in Auckland. He was a sergeant (wireless operator/air gunner) in the Royal New Zealand Air Force, 99 Squadron. He had embarked on the Aorangi vessel and trained in Canada at the RCAF, 1 Wireless School in Montreal, Quebec, and then the RCAF, 2 Wireless School in Calgary, Alberta. He then moved to England in May 1940. His twin brother Ian was also serving in the air force at Ohakea as was another brother Allan at Hobsonville. He was buried at Texel (Den Burg) Cemetery, Plot K. Row 4. Grave 89. He is memorialised at All Saints Church in Ponsonby.

==== Gordon Bert Osborne ====
Gordon Bert Osborne was killed in action in Tobruk, Western Desert, North Africa on December 1. He was a private in the army and part of the 18 Infantry Battalion. He had been educated at Northcote Primary School and played for Northcote and Birkenhead Ramblers as a junior and then Ellerslie United later on after living in Onehunga at the time of his enlistment. His name is on a memorial at the Onehunga War Memorial Swimming Pool. He was married to Alys O. Osborne of Birkenhead, and 22 years of age when he died, and was buried at the Knightsbridge War Cemetery, Acroma, Libya. His father was Labour Party M.P. Arthur George Osborne, who was the M.P for the Manukau electorate.

==== Charles John Brockliss ====
On December 24 Charles John Brockliss died at the age of 58. He played for Newton Rangers from 1908 to 1914 as a foundation member. He went on to be a member of the first executive of the Auckland Rugby League from 1915 to 1923 and a vice-president for many years. He played for Auckland in 1910 in a match against Nelson and for Auckland again in 1913 in an exhibition match at Pukekohe against the champion North Shore Albions side.

== Senior first grade competitions ==
=== Preliminary rounds ===
==== Preliminary round 1 ====
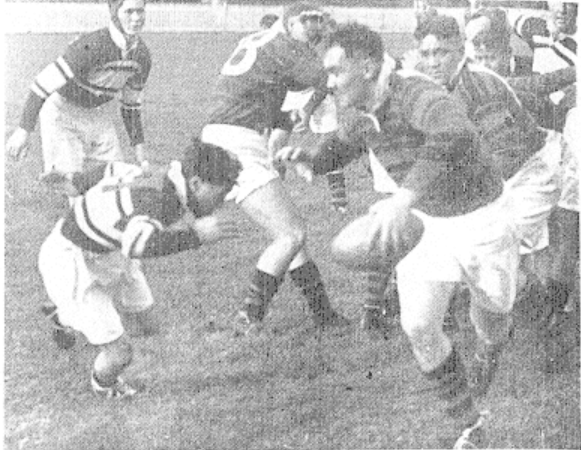
George Mitchell with the ball

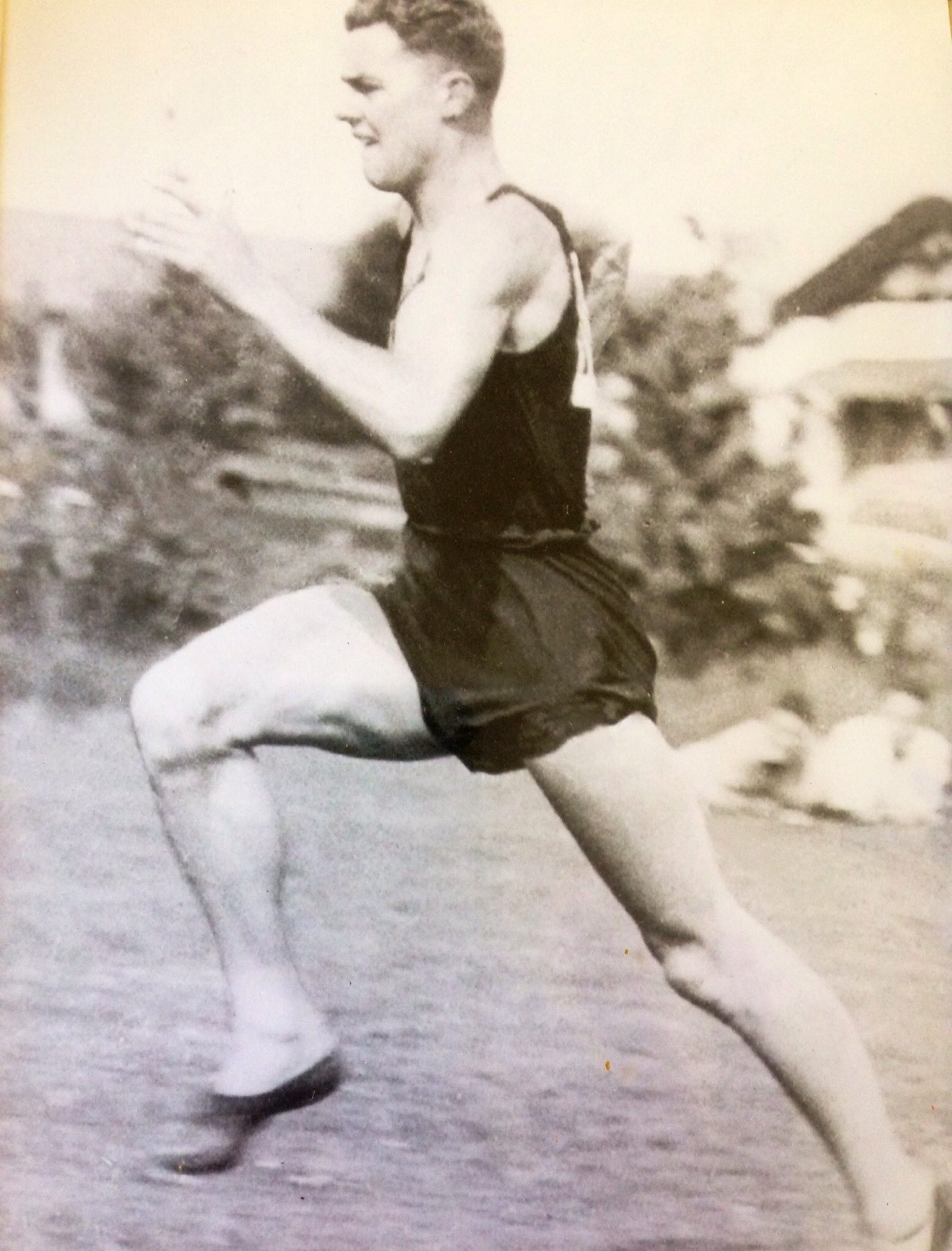

Alan Sayers, the former New Zealand 440 yard champion in 1937, and 1938 British Empire Games representative was on debut for Richmond Rovers. He had previously been playing rugby for Waikato, though he was originally from Auckland where he had been educated at Royal Oak Primary School and Auckland Grammar School. Sayers had scored a record 53 tries for Hamilton Old Boys in the Stag Trophy but had broken his collarbone in a match in 1939 and not played again until this season with Richmond Rovers. He played on the wing in the first half and "impressed with his powerful running and clever anticipation" This was to be his only season playing rugby league as he enlisted in the army and was seconded to the Royal New Zealand Navy where he served as an intelligence officer in the South Pacific. He died in 2017 aged 101 and is survived by his son, Auckland councillor Greg Sayers. During the matches Patrick O'Hanlon (aged 18) was concussed and taken to Auckland Public Hospital. It was said that his condition was not serious. For Ponsonby their forward W Briggs scored two first half tries and added a third after following up a kick from Arthur Kay who also scored two tries and kicked three conversions.

19 April	Richmond	34-17 (18-7)	Manukau	Carlaw Park 1
3:00	Try: Dave Solomon 2, Leo Davis, Alf Broadhead, Alan Sayers, Abbie Graham, H McIntosh, William Kinney; Con: Charles Webb 5		Try: W Butler 2, Joe Murray; Con: Tommy Chase 2 Pen: Joe Murray, Tommy Chase	Referee: George Kelly

19 April	Ponsonby	27-10 (11-7)	Marist	Carlaw Park 1
1:45	Try: W Briggs 3, Arthur Kay 2, White, James Morrell; Con: Arthur Kay 3		Try: John Anderson, Phil Donovan; Pen: John Anderson 2	Referee: J O'Shannessy

19 April	City	19-12 (7-12)	Papakura	Carlaw Park 2
3:00	Try: Alan Donovan 2, Dwyer; Con: Alan Donovan 2, James Brassey; Pen: Alan Donovan, James Brassey		Try: Ray Halsey, Lionel Halsey; Con: J McInnes; Pen: J McInnes 2	Referee: H Tate

19 April	North Shore	21-5 (18-3)	Newton	Carlaw Park 2
1:45	Try: Roy Clark, Eric Chatham, Clarrie Petersen, Owen Wilkie, J McArthur; Pen: Clarrie Petersen; Drop: Verdun Scott		Try: Harry Emus; Pen: Edgar Tredea	Referee: J Jones

==== Preliminary round 2 ====
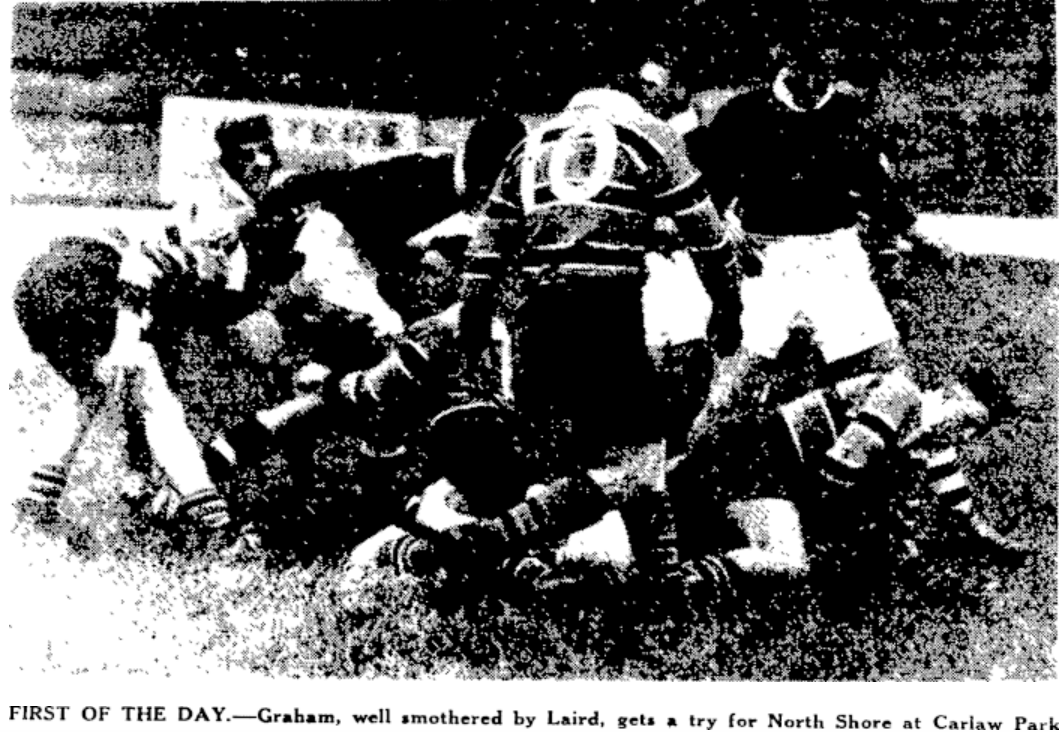
Bruce Graham scoring a try for North Shore in the tackle of Allen Laird (Ponsonby). Both would go on to represent New Zealand in 1946 and 1948 respectively.

Bob Scott scored a try for Ponsonby after a "thrilling race" with teammate Arthur Kay to reach the ball first. Jack Smith had kicked four goals for the winners but received a head injury in the second half and was carried from the field. Most teams used a large number of players in these matches with Manukau making six second half changes in their 38–10 win over Newton. Newton was now being coached by former New Zealand international Roy Hardgrave who had begun his career with them before playing professionally in England for St Helens and York before a stint at Toulouse. After returning to New Zealand in 1938 he played two seasons for Mount Albert before Newton recruited him to coach this season. Following these matches some players departed for the war such as Malcolm Cato, the Mount Albert standoff. He was killed in an air accident on July 16, 1942. Joe Gunning was called up for military service at home but he expected to be available for club matches.

26 April	North Shore	28-8 (10-8)	Ponsonby	Carlaw Park 1
3:00	Try: Bruce Graham 2, Thomas Field, Horace Hunt, Owen Wilkie, Verdun Scott; Con: Jack Smith 2, Verdun Scott; Pen: Jack Smith 2		Try: White, Arthur Kay; Pen: Arthur Kay	Referee: Sergeant K.M. McIvor

26 April	City	5-5 (0-5)	Mount Albert	Carlaw Park 1
1:45	Try: Chappie Gould; Pen: Alan Donovan		Try: Arthur McInnarney; Pen: Bert Leatherbarrow	Referee: Emmet Pope

26 April	Manukau	38-10 (27-5)	Newton	Carlaw Park 2
3:00	Try: W Butler 2, Muri 2, George Shilton 2, J Martin, Lipscombe, Pita Ririnui, Wiremu Te Tai; Con: Tommy Chase 3, W Butler		Try: James Silva 2 Con: Edgar Tredea; Pen: Edgar Tredea	Referee: Jack Donovan

26 April	Papakura	11-10 (8-3)	Marist	Carlaw Park 2
1:45	Try: Trevor Hosken 2, Clarke; Con: J McInnes		Try: Bidwell 2 Con: John Anderson; Pen: John Anderson	Referee: J. O'Shannessy

=== Fox Memorial standings ===
Team	Pld	W	D	L	F	A	Pts
North Shore Albions	16	13	1	2	304	138	27
Manukau	16	13	0	3	360	115	26
Richmond Rovers	15	9	0	6	235	149	18
City Rovers	15	7	1	7	184	157	15
Newton Rangers	16	7	1	8	188	277	15
Ponsonby United	15	6	2	7	171	169	14
Marist Old Boys	16	6	1	9	163	287	13
Mount Albert United	15	5	0	10	187	238	10
Papakura	16	1	0	15	130	392	2

=== Fox Memorial results ===
==== Round 1 ====
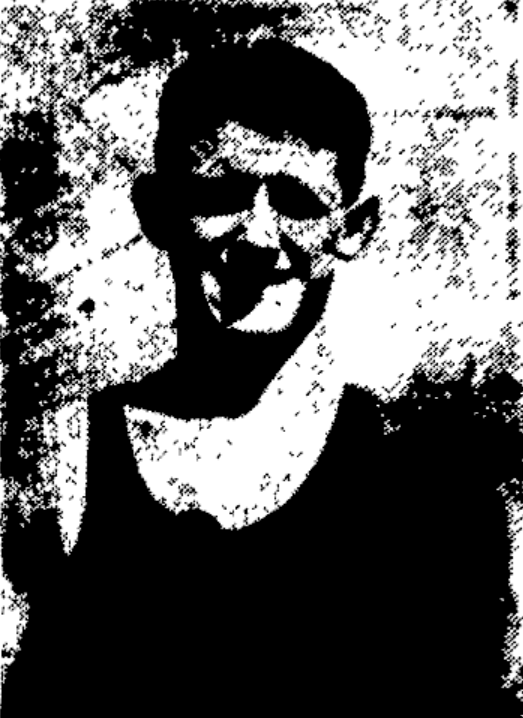
Harry Emus, a good junior runner kicked four points for Newton.

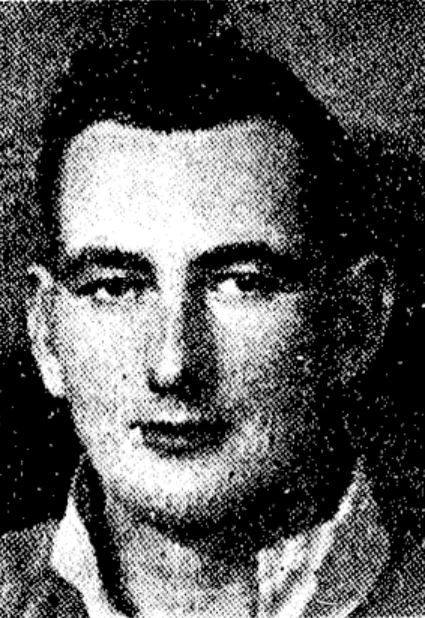
John Anderson who scored two tries and kicked two conversions for Marist

In the main match between North Shore and Manukau it was the brilliant organised back play of North Shore that won it for them. They scored five tries to none with backs Owen Wilkie, Brown, and Roy Clark (2) scoring four of them. For Manukau, Joe Murray on the wing ran incisively but did not get the support he needed. Murray had been a prominent in rugby union for Hawke's Bay and had toured Fiji with the New Zealand Māori side in 1938 where he starred. Pita Ririnui tried hard for Manukau in the forwards while Clarrie Petersen was the best of the North Shore pack, he had also played rugby for Hawkes Bay before switching codes in 1937. City's match with Newton saw them pass 5,000 points scored in the first grade competition. They were the first team to do so. Robert Grotte, their player-coach was outstanding and scored a "splendid try". Ex-Marist junior five eighth, Alan Donovan scored a try and kicked two conversions and two penalties in City's 20–13 win. In their forwards Hawea Mataira and his brother W Mataira "stood out prominently" with the latter hooking very well and giving the backs "numerous chances". For Newton, Harry Emus, an ex-amateur sprinter scored two tries, one of which came when he "turned nicely past" Warwick Clarke to score. Clarke it was mentioned had had a successful time bowling for Green Lane in suburban cricket recently. Alan Watkins played well at halfback for Newton after previously having played two years of seniors for Richmond, while outside him was Len Schultz who had transferred from Mount Albert and had played for York in England in the mid-1930s. Richmond beat Ponsonby after coming back from 0–7 down at halftime. Their winning try came in the last minute with the scores level 12-12, when Abbie Graham put in a cross field kick for Lyndsay Jack to gather and score after beating Ponsonby full back Bob Scott. Marist played with "a sparkle in their play" to beat Mount Albert 20–18. Their win was more comfortable than the score suggested as they led by 15 points at one stage and 20 to 8 near full time following an excellent performance by loose forward John Anderson who scored two tries and kicked two conversions. In their backs the standout was Arthur McInnarney who was "the best back on the ground", being responsible for three of their tries. Late in the match Basil Cranch scored a brilliant try from inside his own 25 for Mount Albert and then a short time later Colin Cowley did the same with Bert Leatherbarrow converting both.

3 May	North Shore	17-4 (8-2)	Manukau	Carlaw Park 1
3:00	Try: G Brown, Owen Wilkie, Roy Clark 2, Bruce Graham; Con: Verdun Scott		Pen: Tommy Chase, W Butler	Referee: Jack Donovan

3 May	Richmond	15-12 (0-7)	Ponsonby	Carlaw Park 1
1:45	Try: Maurice Potter, Wally Tittleton, Lindsay Jack; Con: Charles Webb 2 Pen: Charles Webb		Try: Hector Dunning, W Briggs; Pen: Arthur Kay	Referee: George Kelly

3 May	Marist	20-18 (12-5)	Mount Albert	Carlaw Park 2
3:00	Try: John Anderson 2, Don McLeod, W Smith; Con: John Anderson 2, Cyril Wiberg; Pen: Cyril Wiberg		Try: Basil Cranch 2, Tommy Hetherington, Colin Cowley; Con: Bert Leatherbarrow 2, Colin Cowley	Referee: Seargeant Ken McIvor

3 May	City	20-13 (7-5)	Newton	Carlaw Park 2
1:45	Try: Robert Grotte, Peter McManus, Fred James, Alan Donovan; Con: Alan Donovan 2 Pen: Alan Donovan 2		Try: Harry Emus 2, Frank Zimmerman; Con: Edgar Tredea; Pen: Edgar Tredea	Referee: Owen Chalmers

==== Round 2 ====
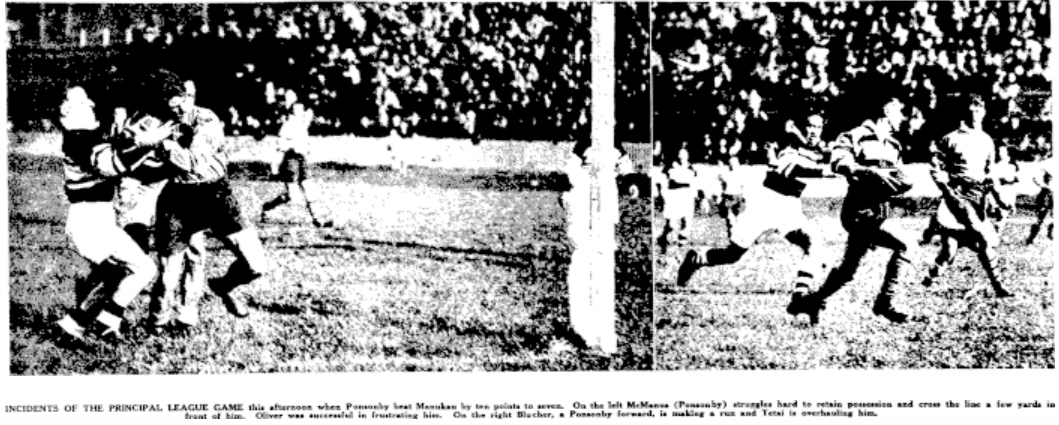

No games were going to be played at Carlaw Park on May 10 due to a military parade being held there on Saturday. However, after receiving more information from the military authorities it was found that the parade would be finished in time for one match to be played at 3pm. Therefore, the Richmond v Marist match went ahead at the later start time of 3:30pm. Unofficial shorter matches were also played between Newton and City at 2pm, and Ponsonby and North Shore at 2:45. Newton won their match 19 to 15, while the Ponsonby-North Shore score was not reported if it indeed took place at all. In the City match Lindsay Simons played for City after returning from Wellington where he had spent some seasons. He had previously been a North Shore player. Schultz, who had also played in Auckland for Mount Albert before moving to England to play for York had now returned and played for Newton. He broke his collarbone and was out for the season. Manukau played Papakura in a friendly at Prince Edward Park in Papakura and won 35 to 20. Jack Hemi played his first game of the season for Manukau.

10 May	Richmond	27-5 (13-3)	Marist	Carlaw Park 1
3:30	Try: Alan Sayers 4, Abbie Graham 2, Charles Webb; Con: Charles Webb 2 Pen: Charles Webb		Try: Harry Dickson; Pen: John Anderson	Referee: Owen Chalmers

==== Round 2 continued ====
17 May	Ponsonby	10-7 (8-4)	Manukau	Carlaw Park 1
3:00	Try: Brian Riley 2 Pen: Hughes, Arthur Kay		Try: Tommy Chase; Pen: Jack Hemi, W Butler	Referee: George Kelly

17 May	City	29-15 (19-8)	Mount Albert	Carlaw Park 1
1:45	Try: Jim Gould 2, Robert Grotte 2, Hawea Mataira 2, V Simpson; Con: Alan Donovan 2 Pen: Alan Donovan, Warwick Clarke		Try: Arthur McInnarney 2, Colin Cowley; Pen: Basil Cranch 3	Referee: J O’Shannessey

17 May	Newton	25-15 (9-10)	Papakura	Carlaw Park 2
3:00	Try: Harry Emus 2, Charles Everitt 2, Alan Watkins 2, Jack Ginders; Con: Harry Emus 2		Try: Pinfold, Ray Halsey, Clarke; Con: J McInnes 2 Pen: R Seymour	Referee: J Jones

==== Round 3 ====
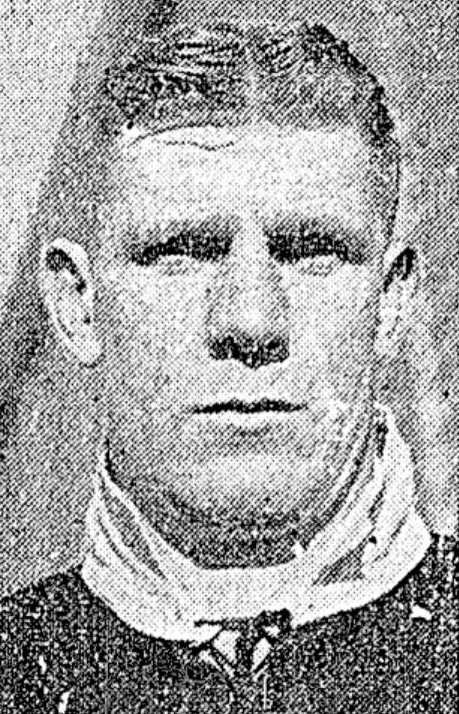
Wally Tittleton scored a try and attacked strongly for Richmond in his sixth season for them.

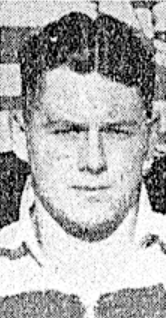
Arthur Kay was dominant for Ponsonby in their five eighths.

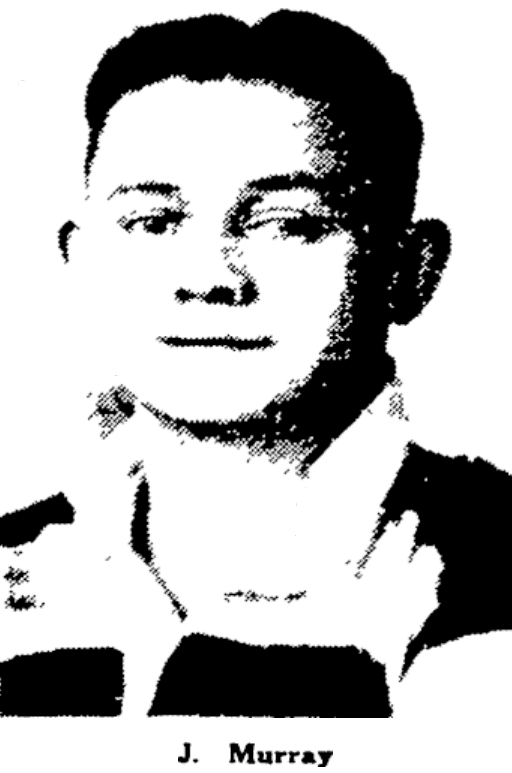
Joe Murray scored 3 tries for Manukau

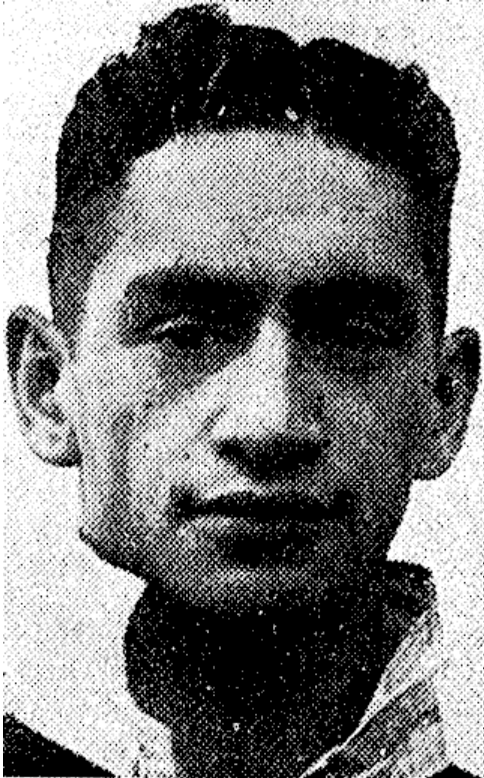
Jack Hemi kicked 8 goals in Manukau's win.

Joe Murray, the Manukau back playing in the second five eighth position scored three tries in their 34–3 win over Marist. Abbie Graham in the Richmond side played his last game before going into camp at Trentham. The City side held Richmond early but then Charles Webb at halfback began to team well with Abbie Graham and Dave Solomon in the five eighths with Wally Tittleton running hard in the centre position and Alan Sayers showing great speed on the wing. Solomon paved the way for the only first half try when he made a break and passed to Lyndsay Jack who took the ball to the City fullback, Warwick Clarke and then transferred back to Solomon who gave it to Tittleton who went through the "shattered defence" to score with Webb converting for a 5-0 half time lead. The City forwards, Hawea Mataira, Bill Jackson, and Walter Findlater really took it to the Richmond side and subdued them for a time. Jack Magill was playing an excellent game at full back to keep them out and then a great back move involving Graham, Solomon, and Tittleton laid on a try to Jack on the wing. City replied when Jim Gould madea fine run passing to Simpson to score and Alan Donovan converting to cut the score to 10–5. Before the end Richmond second rower George Mitchell scored a try from scrambling play to secure the win. Eric Chatham set up the opening try for North Shore for Clarrie Petersen in their 17–7 win over Ponsonby but was injured soon after and replaced by Owen Wilkie. While shortly after Bob Scott who was playing "a fine positional game" for Ponsonby at fullback was injured and had to leave the field. The heavy North Shore forward pack were dominating the scrums and B McArthur was throwing long passes from the scrum to their backs. Despite this before halftime Ponsonby won a scrum and Des Williams threws a pass to Arthur Kay who made an "incisive dash" before handing on to Brian Riley who passed to Thomas for a try with Kay's conversion giving them a 7–5 halftime lead. North Shore proved too good in the second half with B McArthur dummying his way over. Jack Smith converted and added two penalties before McArthur scored his second near full time. Papakura ran Mount Albert close in the 3pm game on the No. A total of 2 field. Richard Shadbolt opened the scoring following involvement from Jack Tristram. Then Papakura replied with R Seymour saving for Papakura at fullback and passing to Clarke who ran to halfway, he then passed to Trevor Hosken who cut the defence to ribbons before passing to Ray Halsey who ran 30 yards to score with J McInnes converting. Arthur McInnarney and Colin Cowley attacked well for Mount Albert but without success then just on halftime the latter was injured and replaced by Hall. In the second half Mount Albert scored through P Caples but then Mullane, Smith, and George Osborne raced for the line and scored with McInnes converting for a 10–8 lead. Papakura seemingly had the game won when Hosken made a brilliant break down the wing but Lonnergan saved at fullback and then Mount Albert attacked with Arthur McInnarney received the ball from a loose ruck by half back Les Clement to score with a "brilliant run" which won the game. A feature of Manukau's 34–3 win against Marist was the speed and elusive running of their backs. Lipscombe in the Manukau three quarters made some great runs down the wing but they could not fully capitalise on their back work and only led 9–3 at halftime. Lipscombe himself blew a try dropping the ball after a break, but then Jack Hemi scured a kick, raced 50 yards and then passed to Wiremu Te Tai on to W Butler who scored. Then Dave McWilliams dropped a scrum pass from Benny Crocker and Kelly picked up the ball and passed to Joe Murray who scored the first of his three tries. Hemi was in fine kicking form despite missing two early penalties, ending up with six successful conversions from six attempts and two conversions. Newton, who had the bye were supposed to play Huntly during the weekend but the match fell through.

24 May	Richmond	13-5 (5-0)	City	Carlaw Park 1
3:00	Try: Wally Tittleton, Lindsay Jack, George Mitchell; Con: Charles Webb 2		Try: V Simpson; Con: Alan Donovan	Referee: Seargeant Ken D. McIvor

24 May	North Shore	17-7 (5-7)	Ponsonby	Carlaw Park 1
1:45	Try: Clarrie Petersen, J McArthur 2 Con: Jack Smith 2 Pen: Jack Smith 2		Try: William Thomas; Con: Arthur Kay; Pen: Arthur Kay	Referee: Jack Donovan

24 May	Mount Albert	11-10 (3-5)	Papakura	Carlaw Park 2
3:00	Try: Richard Shadbolt, P Caples, Arthur McInnarney; Con: Bert Leatherbarrow		Try: Ray Halsey, George Osborne; Con: J McInnes	Referee: Emmet Pope

24 May	Manukau	34-3 (9-3)	Marist	Carlaw Park 2
1:45	Try: Joe Murray 3, Pita Ririnui, George Shilton, W Butler; Con: Jack Hemi 6 Pen: Jack Hemi 2		Try: Gower	Referee: George Kelly

==== Round 4 ====
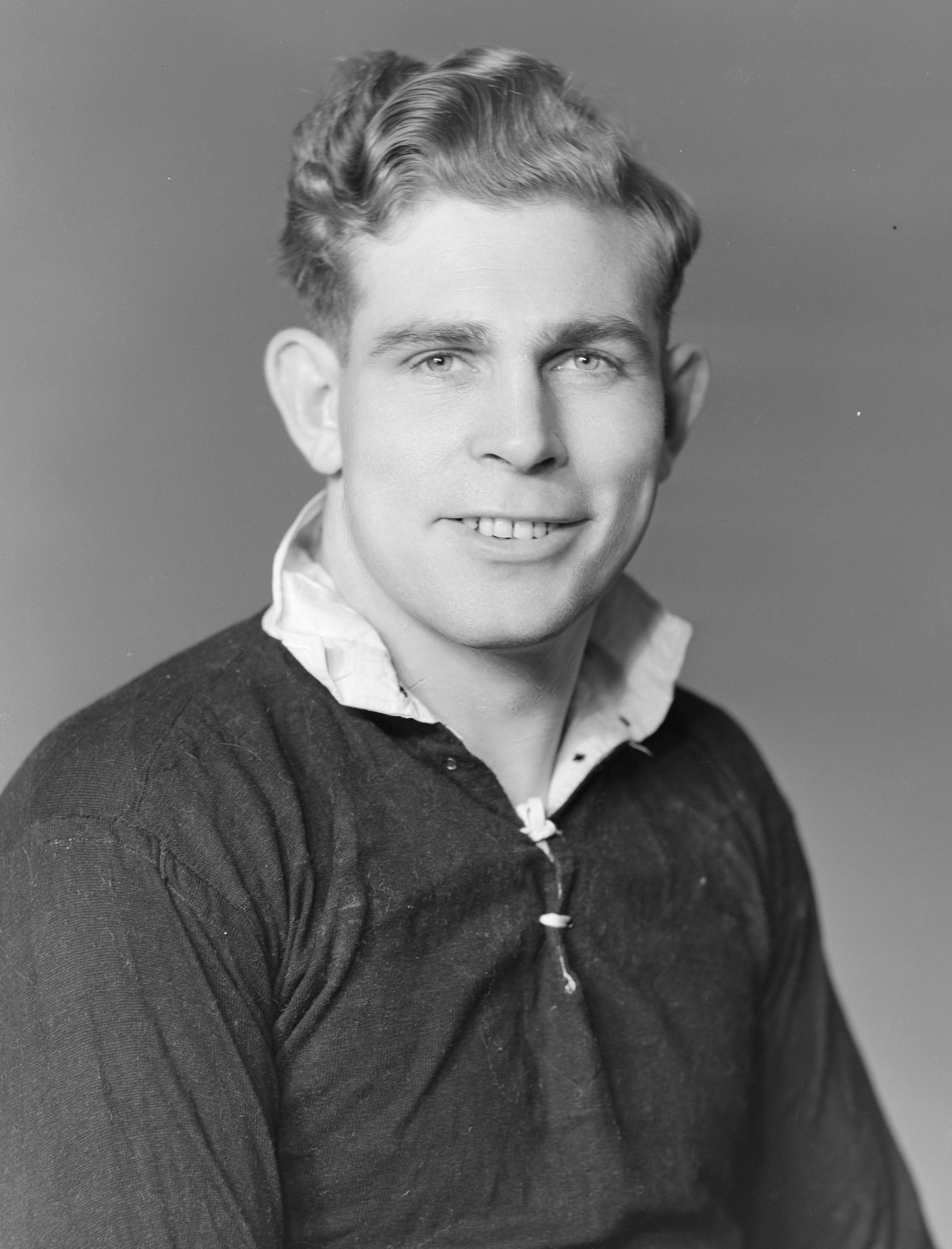
Johnny Simpson, the Ponsonby forward who would play rugby during the war years and go on to play for the All Blacks.

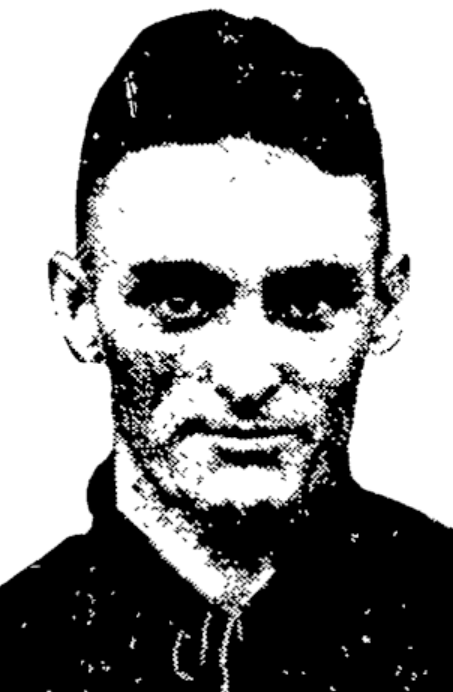
Ted Mincham (Richmond)

Ted Mincham played his first game of senior football for over a year and scored the winning try for Richmond. Also making their debut for Richmond was Harry Meltzer at centre. It was to be his only appearance for them. Meltzer joined them after leaving Mount Albert Grammar School a year earlier where he had played rugby union. Meltzer was also a good cricketer playing for the Grafton club and Auckland B. He had already enlisted in the war effort the previous year aged 18 and went away to fight in and Palestine and Egypt. Future All Black Johnny Simpson scored his debut try for Marist seniors in their 23–23 draw with Newton. John Anderson scored three tries and kicked three conversions and a penalty while for Newton, Harry Emus scored three tries and kicked two conversions and a penalty. Marist had led by 15 points at one stage in the second half before Newton mounted a big comeback and with a conversion attempt to win the game the captain, Jack Ginders surprisingly gave the ball to Edgar Tredea despite Emus having kicked well during the game. Tredea missed and the game was drawn. Brian Riley, the prolific try scorer for Ponsonby scored along with fellow backs White and Carr.

31 May	Ponsonby	11-3 (3-0)	Mount Albert	Carlaw Park 1
1:30	Try: White, Carr, Brian Riley; Con: Arthur Kay		Try: Lonergan	Referee: H Tate

31 May	Richmond	12-7 (5-4)	North Shore	Carlaw Park 1
3:00	Try: Maurice Potter, Ted Mincham; Con: Charles Webb; Pen: Charles Webb 2		Try: J McArthur; Pen: Jack Smith 2	Referee: Jack Donovan

31 May	City	11-9 (8-7)	Papakura	Carlaw Park 2
1:30	Try: Peter McManus, Alan Donovan, Robert Grotte; Pen: Warwick Clarke		Try: H Hogan; Con: R Seymour; Pen: R Seymour 2	Referee: George Kelly

31 May	Newton	23-23 (8-13)	Marist	Carlaw Park 2
3:00	Try: Harry Emus 3, Charles Everitt, Frank Zimmerman; Con: Harry Emus 2, Edgar Tredrea; Pen: Harry Emus		Try: John Anderson 3, Johnny Simpson, Vic Barchard; Con: John Anderson 3 Pen: John Anderson	Referee: Owen Chalmers

==== Round 5 ====
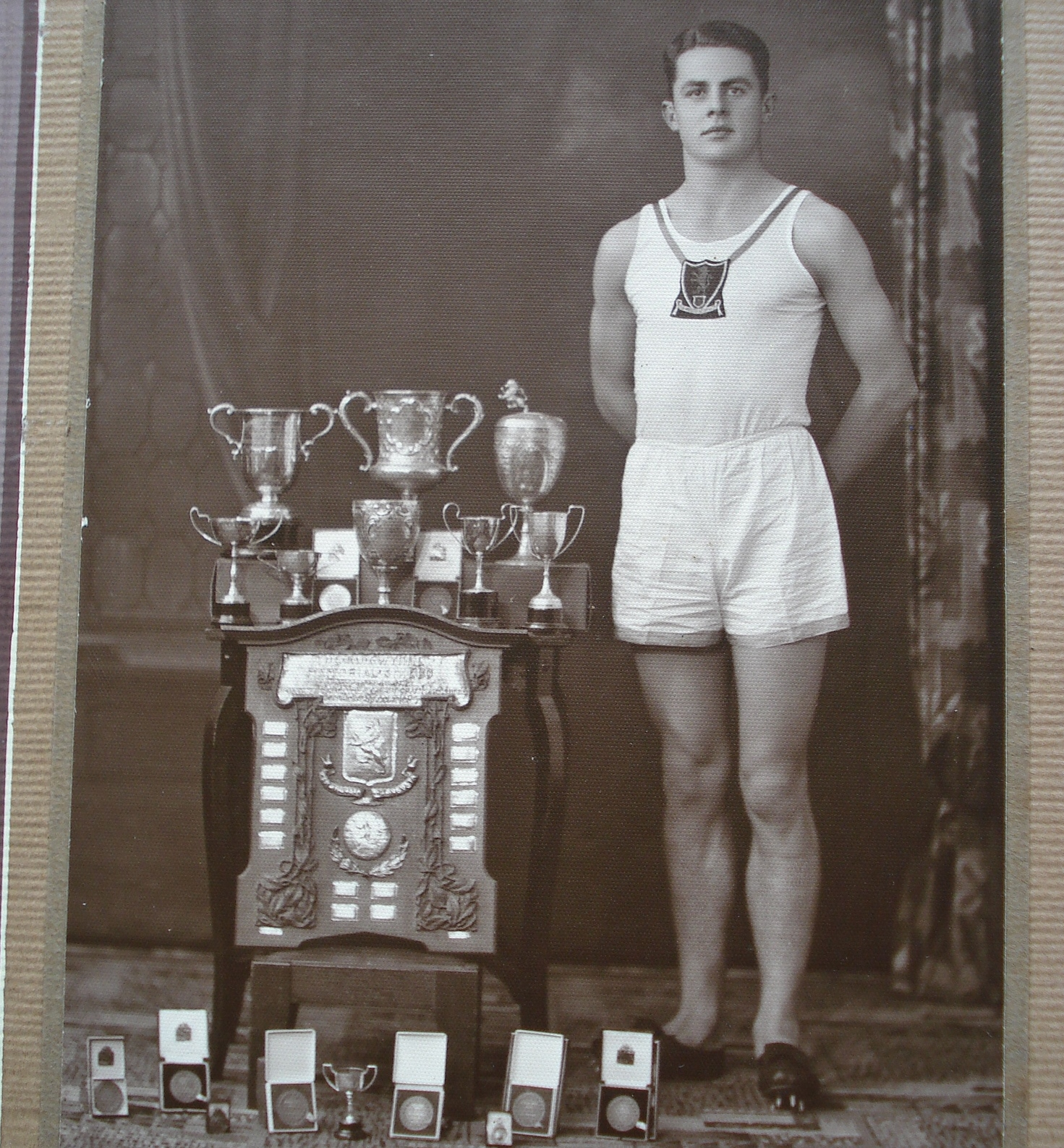
Alan Sayers scored a record seven tries for Richmond in their win.

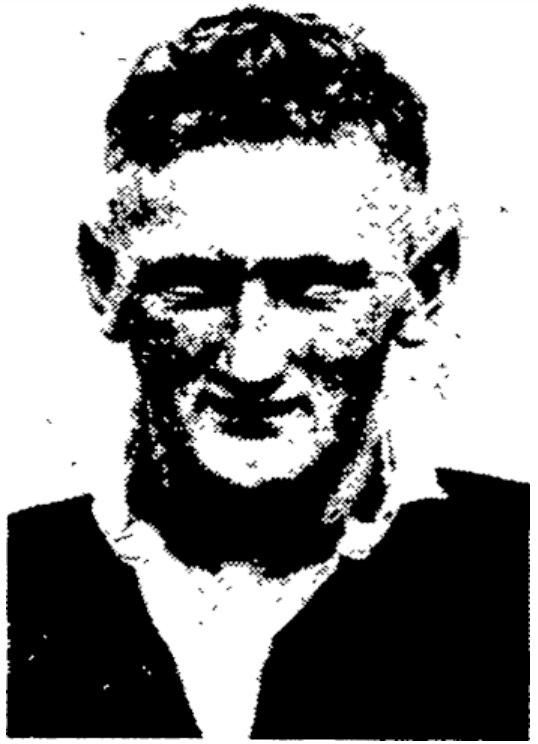
Abbie Graham, the Richmond five eighth who played his last game before going away to war.

Despite heavy rain during the week the Carlaw Park fields were still in good conditions. Alan Sayers scored a remarkable 7 tries for Richmond in their match against Papakura which was a senior club record. Abbie Graham was on military leave and played a "brilliant game" in the Richmond five eighths. It was to be his final war before he went away to war. Up to this point he had played approximately 46 senior games for them scoring 22 tries. He returned to the side after the war and played for Auckland and then made his debut for New Zealand in 1947. Joe Cootes played for Manukau after moving up from Wellington but was said to be returning to Wellington that week. The side was missing their large forward, Marsh, but Steve Watene played his first game of the season.

7 June	Manukau	11-5 (6-3)	City	Carlaw Park 1
3:00	Try: W Butler 3 Con: Steve Watene		Try: Robert Grotte; Pen: Warwick Clarke	Referee: Jack Donovan

7 June	North Shore	27-3 (17-0)	Marist	Carlaw Park 1
1:45	Try: B McArthur, Clarrie Petersen 2, Eric Chatham, Roy Clark; Con: Jack Smith 5 Pen: Jack Smith		Try: John Anderson	Attendance: E Pope

7 June	Richmond	32-4 (14-4)	Papakura	Carlaw Park 2
3:00	Try: Alan Sayers 7, Lindsay Jack, Leo Davis, Alf Broadhead; Con: Charles Webb		Pen: R Seymour 2	Referee: Jack Hawkes

7 June	Mount Albert	12-11 (7-2)	Newton	Carlaw Park 2
1:45	Try: Colin Cowley, Jack Tristram; Con: Les Clement 2 Pen: Basil Cranch		Try: Robert Cheater; Con: Harry Emus; Pen: Harry Emus 3	Referee: George Kelly

==== Round 6 ====
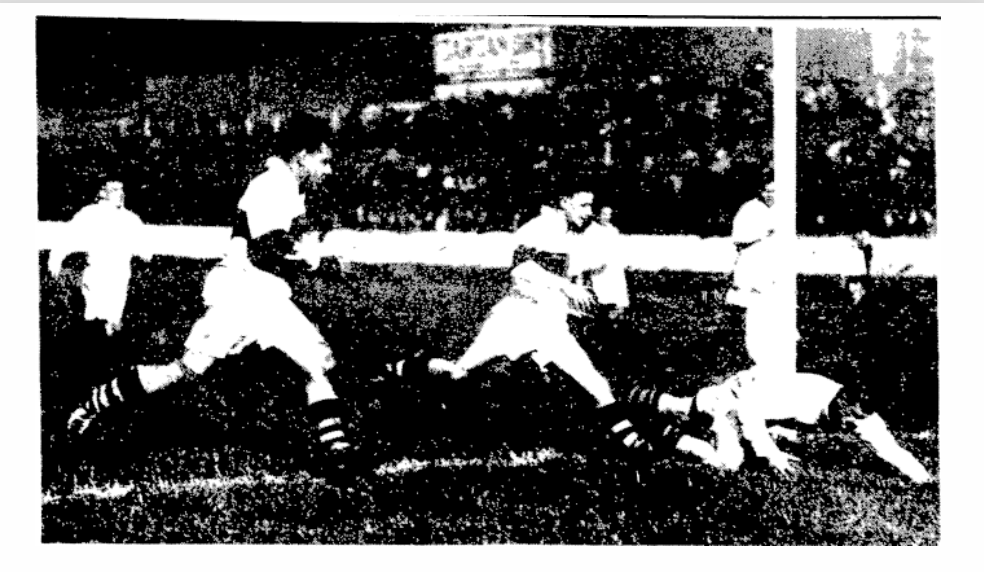
Wally Tittleton of Richmond scoring v Newton

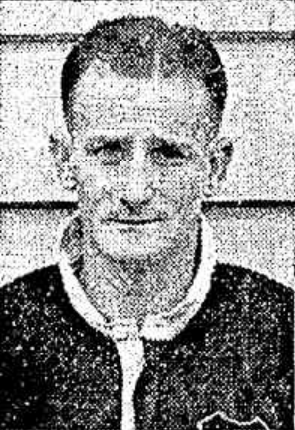
Jack Smith who scored a try, kicked a conversion and 3 penalties.

In the main match North Shore beat City 16 to 14 after Roy Clark drop kicked a goal in the last minute of the game. In addition to kicking four goals for North Shore, Jack Smith scored a spectacular try when he intercepted a pass in midfield and went on a diagonal run dragging the defence across the field before a wide swerve in the opposite direction saw him round the defenders and score between the posts. Newton upset Richmond by 17 points to 14 and were helped by M Barnard who had played representative rugby league for Canterbury and the South Island and had trialed for New Zealand in 1939. The win meant that Richmond's lead at the top of the championship was reduced to 2 points. Bernard Lowther (senior) debuted for Richmond in the five eighths and played well with C Williams. Lowther's son Bernie Lowther played for Richmond, Canterbury-Bankstown and South Sydney in the 1970s as well as representing Auckland and New Zealand. Marist and Ponsonby were locked at 17-17 midway through the second half and their forwards attacked time and again with Ponsonby repelling them each time, however eventually Marist forward, Kenneth Finlayson, son of former New Zealand cricket and rugby league international Charles Finlayson scored a try which lock, John Anderson converted. Anderson finished with 13 points from a try, 3 conversions and 2 penalties. For Ponsonby their first five eighth Arthur Kay was outstanding scoring 2 tries and kicking 4 goals. He was said to be the best back on the field and "often cut the defence to ribbons". Jack Hemi scored 22 points for Manukau in their heavy defeat of Papakura. At this point of the season it was proposed to relegate senior B teams to the reserve grade and attach them to affiliated senior clubs. However the Junior Control Board strongly objected. It was decided to try and play senior B games earlier so that players could then play for senior sides in the 3pm matches if they were short.

14 June	North Shore	16-14 (10-2)	City	Carlaw Park 1
3:00	Try: J McArthur, Jack Smith; Con: Jack Smith; Pen: Jack Smith 3 Drop: Roy Clark		Try: W Mataira, Chappie Gould; Con: Warwick Clarke; Pen: Warwick Clarke 3	Referee: George Kelly

14 June	Newton	17-14 (13-8)	Richmond	Carlaw Park 1
1:45	Try: Harry Emus, Frank Zimmerman, Harry Burton; Con: Harry Emus, Edgar Tredea; Pen: Harry Emus 2		Try: Leo Davis, Alan Sayers, Wally Tittleton, John Crookall; Con: Charles Webb	Referee: J O'Shannessey

14 June	Marist	22-17 (17-13)	Ponsonby	Carlaw Park 2
3:00	Try: John Anderson, Ashley Best, J Smith, Kenneth Finlayson; Con: John Anderson 3 Pen: John Anderson 2		Try: Arthur Kay 2, William Thomas; Con: Arthur Kay 3 Pen: Arthur Kay	Referee: H Tate

14 June	Manukau	43-8 (22-5)	Papakura	Carlaw Park 2
1:45	Try: Joe Murray 3, Jack Hemi 2, George Shilton, W Martin, Tommy Chase, Ralph Martin; Con: Jack Hemi 6 Pen: Jack Hemi 2		Try: Hancock, George Osborne; Con: Trevor Hosken	Referee: Jack Donovan

==== Round 7 ====
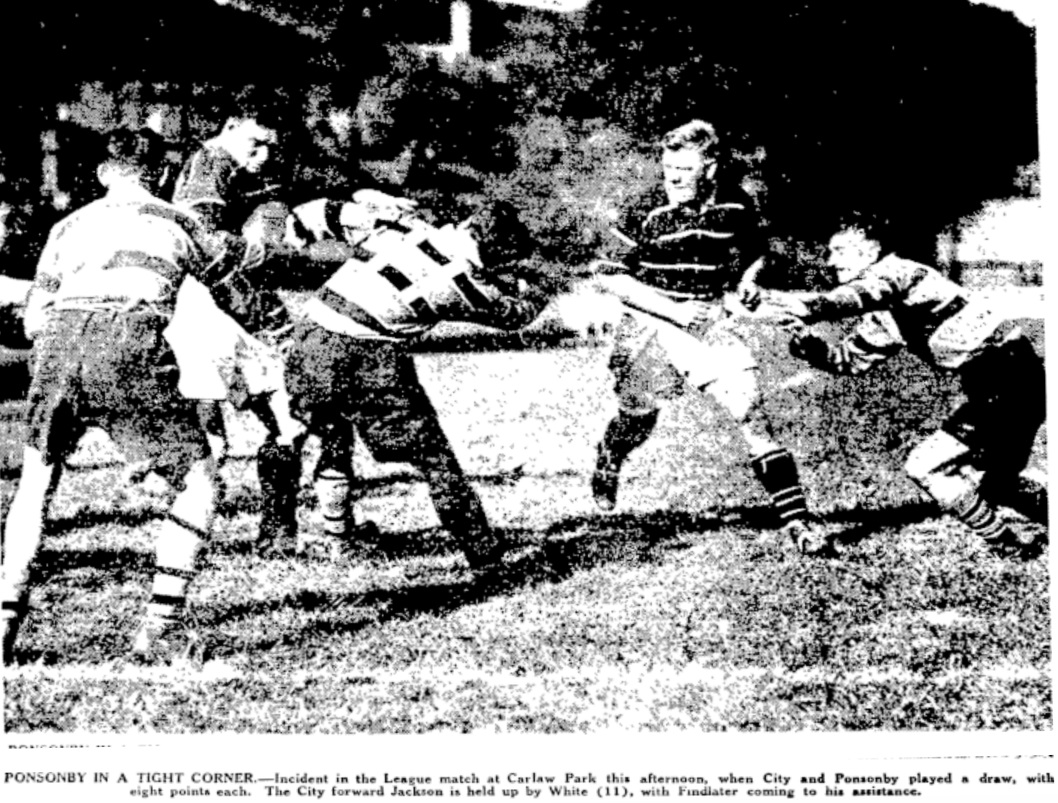
Wirepa Jackson, the City forward with the ball is being tackled by White the Ponsonby hooker. Looming in support for Ponsonby is Walter Findlater.

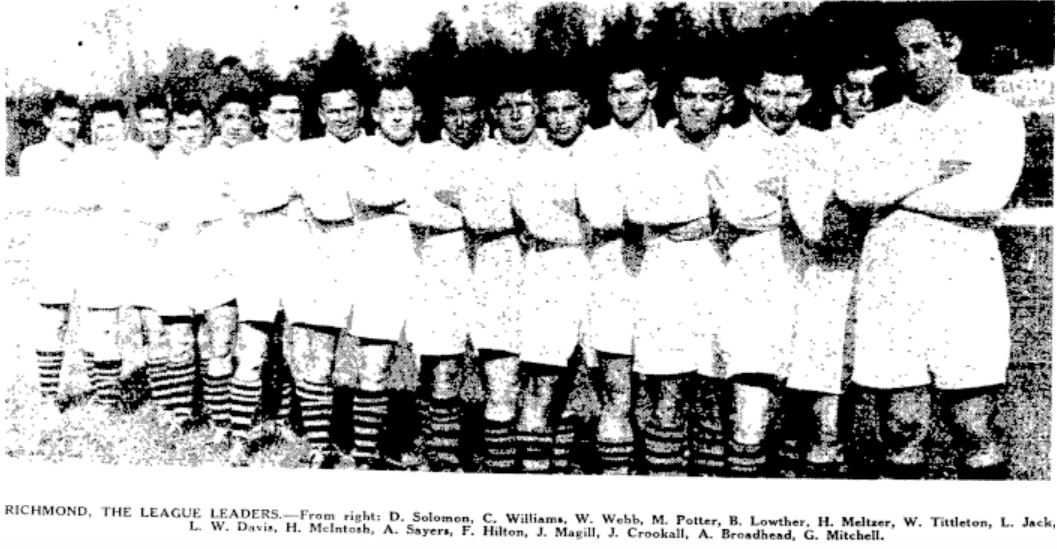

At Carlaw Park the Richmond side was photographed in their unusual all white jerseys and shorts. They played in them for the season after their traditional blue and maroon uniforms had not been made and delivered in time for the season. In the match between North Shore and Papakura played at the Ellerslie Domain, Clarrie Peterson of North Shore, a former Hawkes Bay rugby representative scored 5 tries while playing in the loose forwards. It was suggested in the New Zealand Herald match report that this may have been a record for a forward in senior matches. During Ponsonby's 8–8 draw with City they brought up their 5,000 point in the senior grade competition becoming the second team to do this after City had done it earlier in the season. Owen Hughes who had played at fullback for City for some years played well in the unfamiliar position of hooker in the absence of W Mataira.

21 June	Manukau	16-5 (7-5)	Newton	Carlaw Park 1
3:00	Try: Joe Murray, Steve Watene; Con: Jack Hemi 2 Pen: Jack Hemi 3		Try: Harry Emus; Con: Edgar Tredrea	Referee: Emmet Pope

21 June	Ponsonby	8-8 (8-5)	City	Carlaw Park 1
1:45	Try: Hector Dunning, Carr; Con: Arthur Kay		Try: J Burgoyne, Raynor; Con: Warwick Clarke	Referee: J Jones

21 June	Mount Albert	13-8 (13-0)	Richmond	Carlaw Park 2
3:00	Try: Basil Cranch, Les Clement, Tommy Hetherington; Con: Les Clement 2		Try: Alan Sayers, John Crookall; Con: Charles Webb	Referee: Jack Hawkes

21 June	North Shore	32-15 (19-4)	Papakura	Ellerslie Domain
3:00	Try: Clarrie Peterson 5, G Brown 2, J McArthur; Con: Jack Smith 4		Try: Ray Halsey, Craig Smith, Keates; Con: J McInnes 2 Pen: J McInnes	Referee: George Kelly

==== Round 8 ====
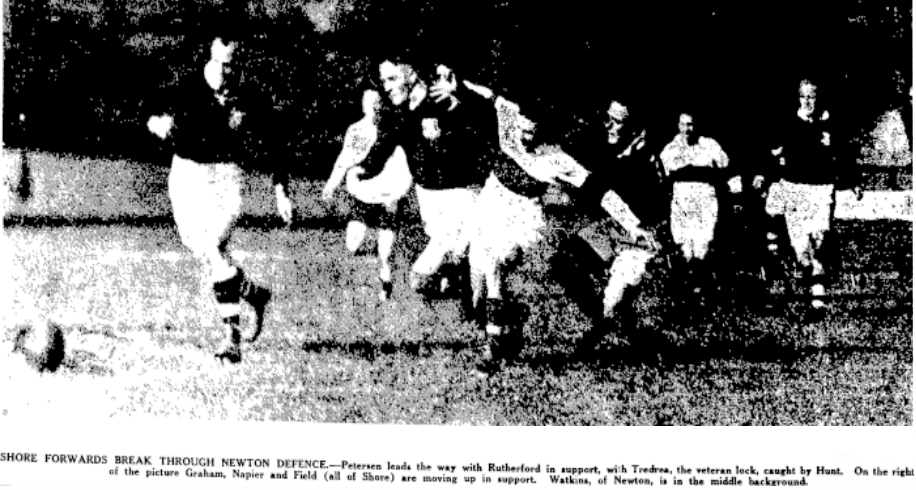
Clarrie Peterson leading the chase for North Shore with Jock Rutherford and Horace Hunt following. The Newton player being grabbed is Edgar Tredea who was playing at full back. In the background is Bruce Graham (North Shore), and Alan Watkins the Newton halfback.

James Brassey played his first competition game for City after debuting for them in 1939 and scored a try. He had played in the preliminary games at the start of the season. He was a very good athlete, particularly running and was also part of the Auckland Grammar 1st XV before leaving school 2 years prior.

28 June	Manukau	14-5 (8-5)	Mount Albert	Carlaw Park 1
3:00	Try: P Awhitu, Joe Murray, W Butler, Pita Ririnui; Con: Jack Hemi		Try: Hucker; Con: Basil Cranch	Referee: Jack Donovan

28 June	North Shore	32-12 (4-10)	Newton	Carlaw Park 1
3:00	Try: Tom Field, G Brown, Clarrie Peterson, Roy Clark, Owen Wilkie 2 Con: Jack Smith 4 Pen: Jack Smith, Verdun Scott 2		Try: James Silva, Harry Emus; Con: Edgar Tredrea; Pen: Harry Emus 2	Referee: Owen Chalmers

28 June	City	14-11 (9-3)	Marist	Carlaw Park 2
3:00	Try: Jim Gould, James Brassey; Con: Warwick Clarke; Pen: Warwick Clarke 3		Try: Harry Dickson, Benny Crocker, Phil Donovan; Con: Cyril Wiberg	Referee: Ernest Pope

28 June	Ponsonby	25-11 (14-8)	Papakura	Carlaw Park 2
1:45	Try: W Briggs, Des Williams, Carr, Hughes; Con: Arthur Kay 3 Pen: Arthur Kay 2		Try: T Hogan, H Hogan, Keates; Con: R Seymour	Referee: A Pearson

==== Round 9 ====
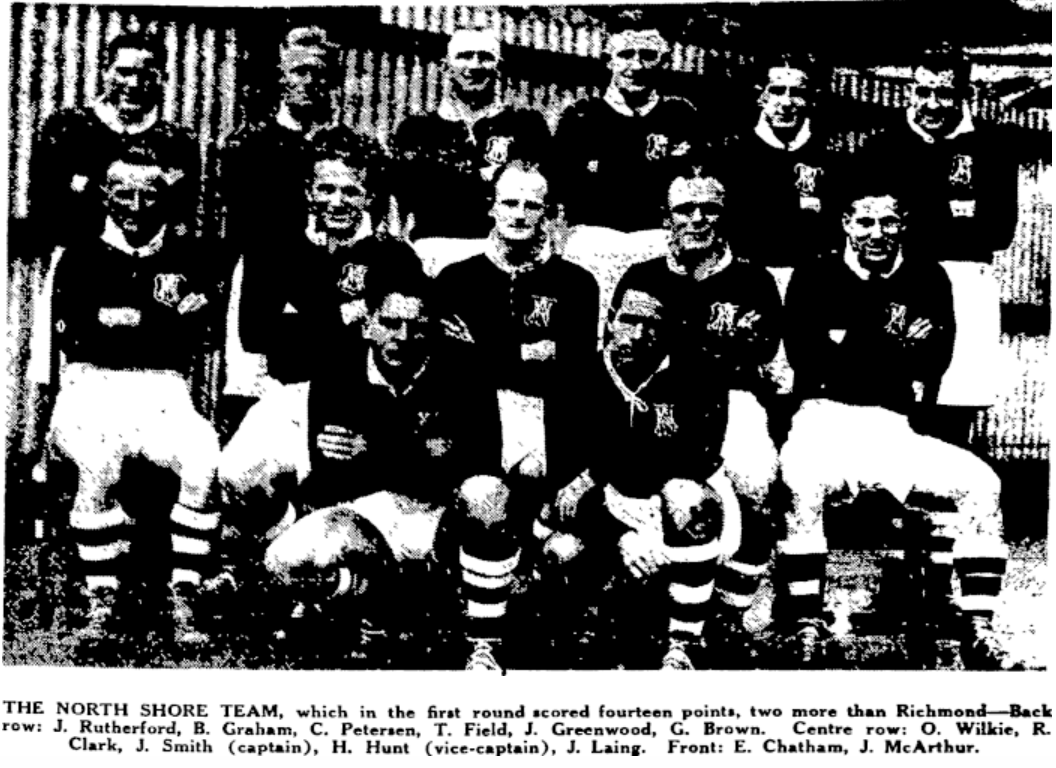
North Shore Albions after winning the Rukutai Shield by leading after the first round was completed.

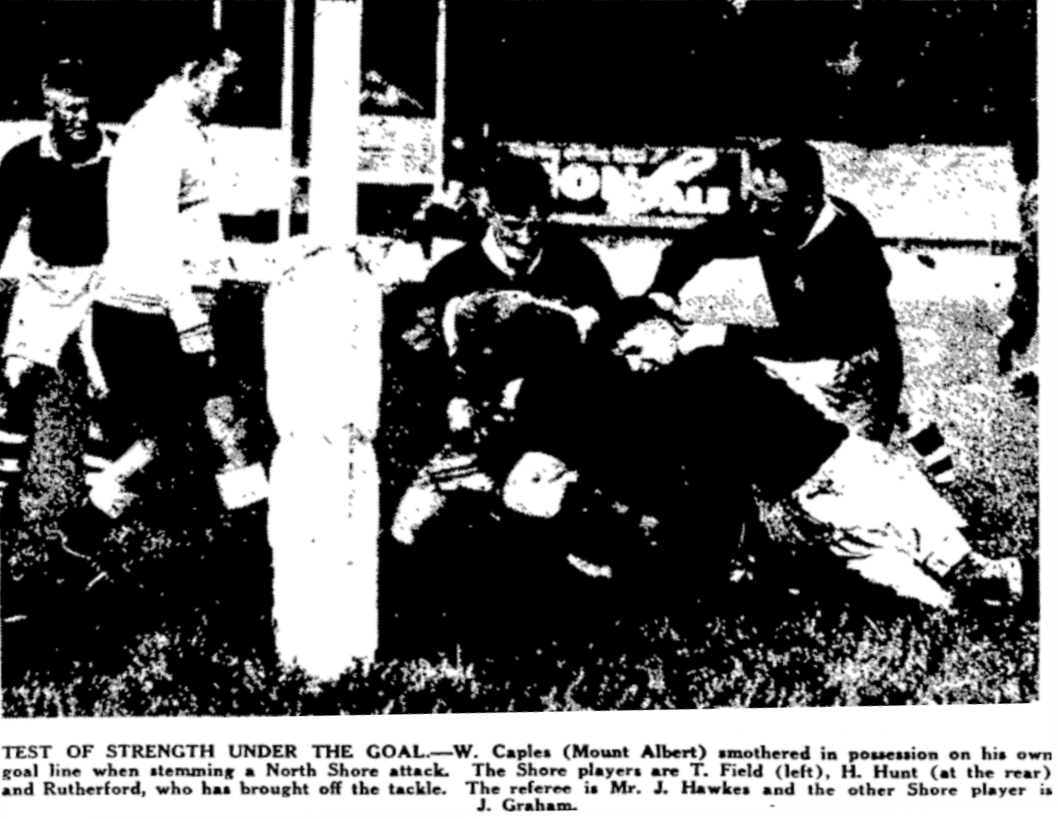
W. Caples of Mount Albert being tackled while defending his try line. The North Shore player behind the tackle is Tom Field, Horace Hunt is behind the tackle to the right, with Jock Rutherford making the tackle, and Bruce Graham is behind the play to the left.

The games were played in greasy conditions at Carlaw Park. Loose forward George Shilton was forced to play halfback for Manukau with the unavailability of F Oliver. He still managed to throw "good long passes" out to Joe Murray and Jack Hemi but the sharpness of a genuine halfback was "severely felt". The game between them and Richmond was played at great speed though at halftime only 7 points had been scored with Manukau leading 4–3 after Hemi kicked a "beautiful long range penalty" just on the break. Tommy Chase was defending well at fullback for Manukau and then they counterattacked with Alan Sayers pulling down P Awhitu before he could reach the ball and referee Jack Donovan awarded a penalty try to Awhitu. Late in the match Dave Solomon made huge efforts to win the game for Richmond and made a blind side run that took the play to the Manukau line. Play swung across field and then back to him and he dived across to score, narrowing the deficit to one point. Then Wally Tittleton kicked long and Alan Sayers got possession and "crowded on the pace, and cheered all the way by Richmond supporters, raced in at the flag" to give them the winning lead. Verdun Scott was unavailable for North Shore as he had gone into camp at Trentham. Arthur McInnarney was also away at camp in Papakura and unable to play for Mount Albert while veteran front rower Richard Shadbolt was also unavailable. Jack Smith had a superb game for North Shore playing at fullback in Scott's absence, kicking 3 goals in each half in their 30–8 defeat of Mount Albert.Don McLeod was sent off for Marist in their match with Papakura. He failed to attend the disciplinary meeting mid week and was stood down until he attended to explain the referees charge. Taripo was on debut for Marist in the same match and it was said that he was “a recent arrival from the islands”. Up to this point few players from the Pacific Islands had played in Auckland though Dave Solomon who had been at Richmond for 2 seasons had been born in Fiji, while his teammate George Mitchell was born in Rarotonga. George's brother Alf Mitchell had also played for Richmond from 1933 to 1936 and had been born in Tonga to an English father and Samoan mother. In Ponsonby's 15–0 win over Newton their winger Murphy scored three tries showing "plenty of speed" and helped by the strong running of centre three quarter Carr who was "improving with each game". Des Williams their halfback set the back line going and made several "clever openings", and gave a display as good as any seen at Carlaw Park so far in the season. During the first half Brian Riley was injured and left the field with Thomas moving from the forwards into the five eighths position and White coming on to move into the forwards.

5 July	Richmond	9-7 (3-4)	Manukau	Carlaw Park 1
3:00	Try: Dave Solomon, Alan Sayers, Lindsay Jack		Try: P Awhitu (penalty try); Pen: Jack Hemi 2	Referee: Jack Donovan

5 July	North Shore	30-8 (15-3)	Mount Albert	Carlaw Park 1
1:45	Try: Clarrie Peterson 2, Owen Wilkie 2, Jack Greenwood, Roy Clark; Con: Jack Smith 5 Pen: Jack Smith		Try: Hucker, Jack Tristram; Pen: Taylor	Referee: Jack Hawkes

5 July	Marist	15-3 (10-0)	Papakura	Carlaw Park 2
1:30	Try: Cyril Wiberg, Benny Crocker, W Smith; Con: Cyril Wiberg 2 Pen: Don McLeod		Try: H Hogan	Referee: J Jones

5 July	Ponsonby	15-0 (3-0)	Newton	Carlaw Park 2
3:00	Try: Murphy 3, Blucher, Arthur Kay			Referee: J O’Shannessey

==== Round 10 ====
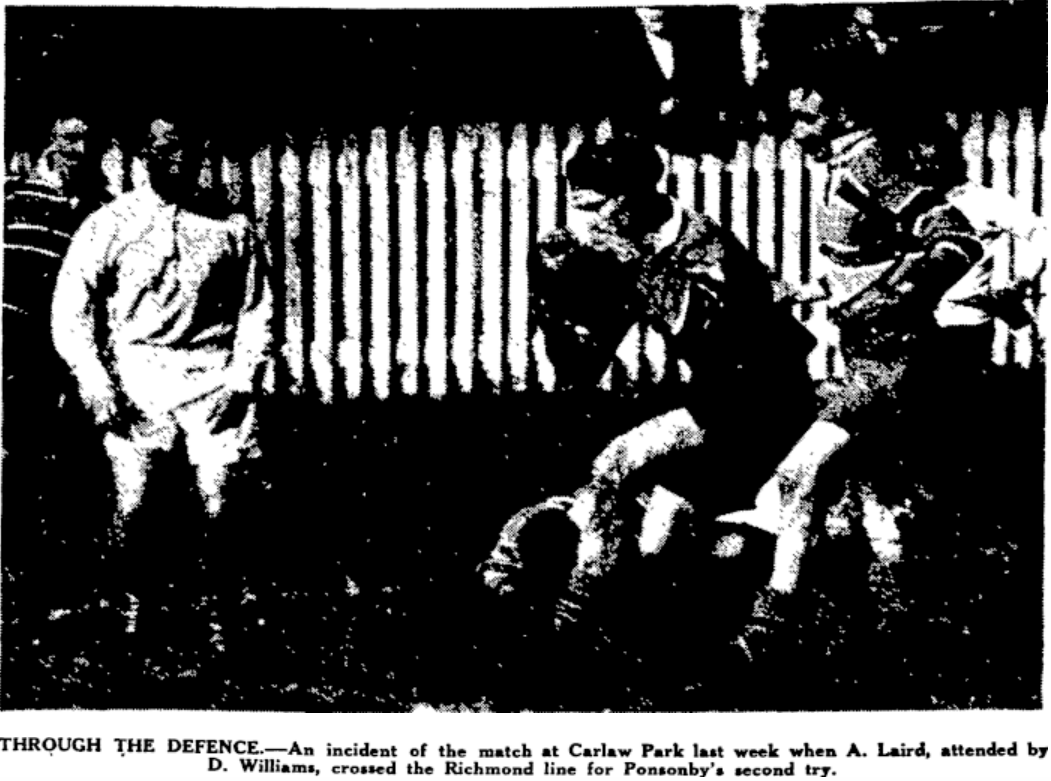
Allen Laird scoring for Ponsonby with halfback Des Williams in support. Laird represented New Zealand in 1948 in 3 matches on the Australian tour.

Manukau had a comfortable 22–7 win over North Shore in the feature match. Jack Major from the Port Waikato area debuted for them at halfback and "gave sharp delivery", while Aubrey Thompson at lock was also on debut. Ivan Gregory from Rotorua played his first game of the season for Manukau and blended "pace with straight running in the centre". The 19 year old Gregory had first played for Manukau in 1939 and was a nephew of Steve Watene. Gregory was 5 foot 10.5 inches tall and weighed 13 stone while Watene was said to be currently 17 stone, 7lb's. Jack Hemi converted three tries and kicked two penalties while W Butler on the wing scored two tries. Hemi teamed well with Joe Murray in the five eighths and "showed clever enterprise in attack" and "cleverly exploited the reverse pass". In the first half Owen Wilkie was injured in the North Shore backline and replaced by Jack Laing who was making his first grade debut. He was the son of Bert Laing who had played for New Zealand from 1919 to 1925 and spent four years at City Rovers and then played 65 games over 7 seasons for North Shore. Newton played their worst game of the season being well beaten by City. In the first half Walter Findlater the City forward was injured and was replaced, while five eighth Green for Newton was also injured and went off the field but Newton did not have any substitutes and played a man short. Warwick Clarke the City fullback converted five of their seven tries and also added two penalties and was said to be "the outstanding player on the ground" with his performance the best seen on the ground all season. Robert Grotte played at first five eighth, not his usual halfback position while Alan Donovan essentially switched places with him. Richmond had a big comeback to beat Ponsonby who started well and led 7-0 early and 14–5 at halftime. Standouts for each team were the Auckland representative five eighths, Arthur Kay (Ponsonby) and Dave Solomon (Richmond). Tries to Wally Tittleton and Alf Broadhead narrowed the gap, and when George Mitchell scored the match was tied 16-16. Kay kicked his fifth penalty goal to put Ponsonby ahead 18-16 but then Solomon scored a "great solo try" for Richmond and Charles Webb converted it to give them a 21–18 win. His try came when Webb at halfback sent him the ball and Solomon made a clever swerving run and then burst straight for the try line and scored between the posts with two defenders hanging on.

19 July	Manukau	22-7 (12-5)	North Shore	Carlaw Park 1
3:00	Try: W Butler 2, W Martin, Joe Murray; Con: Jack Hemi 3 Pen: Jack Hemi 2		Try: Clarrie Peterson; Con: Jack Smith; Pen: Jack Smith	Attendance: 7,000; Referee: George Kelly

19 July	Richmond	21-18 (5-14)	Ponsonby	Carlaw Park 1
1:45	Try: H McIntosh, Wally Tittleton, Alf Broadhead, George Mitchell, Dave Solomon; Con: Charles Webb 3		Try: Arthur Kay, Allen Laird; Con: Arthur Kay; Pen: Arthur Kay 5	Attendance: 7,000; Referee: A Pearson

19 July	City	35-9 (12-2)	Newton	Carlaw Park 2
3:00	Try: Chappie Gould, J Burgoyne, James Brassey, Alan Donovan, Hawea Mataira, James Corbett, Peter McManus; Con: Warwick Clarke 5 Pen: Warwick Clarke 2		Try: Young; Con: Harry Emus; Pen: Harry Emus 2	Attendance: 7,000; Referee: H Tate

19 July	Mount Albert	18-11 (11-11)	Marist	Carlaw Park 2
1:45	Try: Jack Tristram, Hetherington, Colin Cowley, Richard Shadbolt; Con: Bert Leatherbarrow, Les Clement; Pen: Basil Cranch		Try: W Smith, John Anderson, Bill Breed; Con: John Anderson	Attendance: 7,000; Referee: Jack Donovan

==== Round 11 ====
George Kelly was refereeing his 50th match involving first grade sides in the clash between Richmond and Marist. He had begun his first grade coaching career in 1937. Jack Major was starting again at halfback for Manukau, replacing F Oliver who had gone to camp. Brian Riley returned from injury and partnered Arthur Kay in the five eighths to good effect though they were outmatched by Jack Hemi and Joe Murray. The Manukau backs and forwards reveled in the heavy conditions. Ivan Gregory, the Manukau centre was injured and went off, with forward Wiremu Te Tai replacing him in the backline. Murray scored a hat trick of tries for the third time this season and had now scored 13 tries on his way to a record 31 tries. His first came when he took a return pass from winger W Butler and outpaced Riley to score in the corner with Hemi converting from the sideline. The Richmond v Marist match was unusual in that there were 28 points scored in the first half and none in the second with Richmond holding on to the 19–9 lead. Alan Sayers scored two tries on the wing. Basil Cranch played well on the right wing for Mount Albert scoring two tries. He gave them a 3-2 half time lead after running hard and kicking ahead, winning the race to the ball to score. Jim Gould nearly took the lead back for Richmond when the left winger beat Cranch and Carter but hooker Bert Leatherbarrow made a try saving tackle. Warwick Clarke set up a go ahead try for City when Gould made and opening and sent him the ball, he ran from his 25 down the left wing and then threw a long infield pass to forward Bill Jackson who had 60 yards of clear field ahead of him and managed to stay in front all the way to the try line. Lonergan scored for Mount Albert and then a penalty to Cranch gave them the lead back, but then Jackson crossed for his second after Alan Donovan at halfback made an opening and Clarke converted to make the score 12–8. On full time Cranch scored his second try but he missed the game winning conversion from wide out. Papakura threatened to record their first win of the season when they led Newton 5–0 at halftime following a try to Hill which was converted by R Seymour. Both teams were struggling to field strong sides and Newton played with just 12 for twenty minutes until another forward arrived at the ground. Charles Everitt and captain Jack Ginders, usually forwards played at full back and wing respectively. In the second half Ginders had moved back into the forwards and he and Frank Zimmerman led the way for the Newton pack. The war was having a significant effect on playing numbers with Jack Smith turning out for the Army rugby side at Eden Park with North Shore having a bye. Teammate, Verdun Scott was also at Trentham training. While there he played for the Central league club and scored a try and kicked a penalty. In the same game was Mount Albert player H McLaughlan. Q Morris and G Welsh of the City side were also there. While Mount Albert captain Martin Hansen had just returned from war injured. While there he met Laurie Mills and Trevor Bramley. Noel Martin the Ponsonby fullback from 1938 to 1939 was a prisoner of war as was Dan Klane. Ivor Stirling and Jack Campbell were also in the Middle East.

26 July	Manukau	18-5 (8-2)	Ponsonby	Carlaw Park 1
3:00	Try: Joe Murray 3, W Butler; Con: Jack Hemi 3		Try: Murphy; Pen: Hughes	Referee: Emmet Pope

26 July	City	12-11 (2-3)	Mount Albert	Carlaw Park 1
1:45	Try: Bill Jackson 2 Con: Warwick Clarke 2 Pen: Warwick Clarke		Try: Basil Cranch 2, Lonergan; Pen: Basil Cranch	Referee: Owen Chalmers

26 July	Richmond	19-9 (19-9)	Marist	Carlaw Park 2
3:00	Try: Alan Sayers 2, Dave Solomon, H McIntosh, C Williams; Con: Charles Webb 2		Try: Smith; Con: John Anderson; Pen: John Anderson 2	Referee: George Kelly

26 July	Newton	13-5 (0-5)	Papakura	Carlaw Park 2
1:45	Try: James Silva 2, Laurent; Con: Harry Emus		Try: Hill; Con: R Seymour	Referee: J O'Shannessey

==== Round 12 ====
Jack Hemi scored 24 points for Manukau which included nine successful kicks at goal (7 conversions and 2 penalties). Jack Smith had been in camp at Trentham and played rugby for the Army team the weekend prior. He returned to North Shore and kicked a penalty in their 8–8 draw with Ponsonby. While playing for Marist, William John Bates was concussed and taken to Auckland Hospital.

2 August	City	12-8	Richmond	Carlaw Park 1
3:00	Try: James Brassey, Hughes; Pen: Warwick Clarke 3		Try: George Mitchell, Wally Tittleton; Con: Charles Webb	Referee: J O'Shannessey

2 August	North Shore	8-8	Ponsonby	Carlaw Park 1
1:45	Try: Clarrie Peterson, Roy Clark; Pen: Jack Smith		Try: Des Williams 2 Con: Arthur Kay	Referee: Jack Hawkes

2 August	Mount Albert	38-18	Papakura	Carlaw Park 2
1:45	Try: Brady 3, Basil Cranch 2, Lonergan 2, Jack Tristram, Les Clement, Richard Shadbolt; Con: Les Clement 2, Bert Leatherbarrow 2		Try: Ray Halsey 2, Burgess, Fleming; Con: G Wellm 2, Craig Smith	Referee: Owen Chalmers

2 August	Manukau	45-3	Marist	Carlaw Park 2
1:45	Try: Jack Hemi 2, Tommy Chase 2, Joe Murray 2, George Shilton, Joe Broughton, W Butler; Con: Jack Hemi 7 Pen: Jack Hemi 2		Try: Smith	Referee: George Kelly

==== Round 13 ====
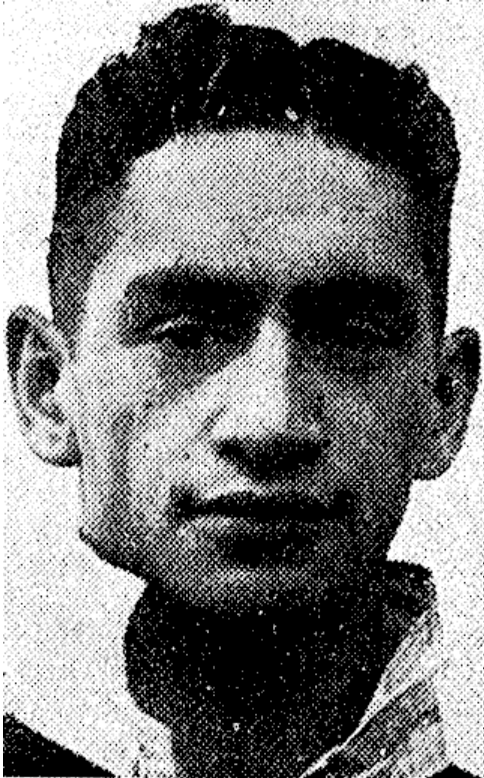
Jack Hemi

Dick Smith

The games at Carlaw Park were played in heavy conditions with a shower of rain before the games and both fields were muddy. Jack Hemi scored his 100th point in senior games for the season in their win over City. There was controversy during the week with Owen Chalmers appointed the referee for the Manukau v City match but Manukau officials requested a different referee and J. O'Shannessey refereed instead. There was no reason recorded in the press and Chalmers had not refereed a senior Manukau game to this point in the season. Discussion over the matter was taken in committee at the control board meeting the following week and Manukau were summoned to appear. They then expressed regret over their actions and it was decided to take no further action. Manukau won the game 7–2 in heavy conditions. The only points in the first half were a well placed drop goal by Warwick Clarke who was near the touchline, the City fullback had been in outstanding form. Tommy Chase was playing in the unfamiliar position of halfback and in the second half he cut through from a scrum with a side stepping run and passed to Pita Ririnui who had broken from the scrum quickly, he sent it on to Joe Murray who scored between the posts for Jack Hemi to convert. Manukau were showing much more on attack for most of the game and only good City defence kept them out. Hemi kicked a penalty goal from a wide angle to bring up his 100 points for the season and make the score 7-2 which it remained until the end despite City making several efforts to score with W Mataira and Bill Jackson prominent. Former New Zealand representative Dick Smith came out of retirement to fill the fullback position which was usually occupied by his brother Jack Smith for North Shore. Jack was away for military training. Dick had debuted for North Shore in 1929 and played one match for New Zealand in 1932. Their uncle was the famous athlete George Smith who played rugby and rugby league for New Zealand and was a champion jockey and runner. Smith was posthumously inducted into the New Zealand Sports Hall of Fame in 1995. He kicked 3 conversions and a penalty in their 23–3 win after they led 20–0 at halftime. Taripo scored Marist's only points with a try. Scholes debuted in the North Shore forwards after moving to Auckland from Wellington where he had been playing for the Central club. The standout forward for North Shore was lock Clarrie Petersen who was said to be the fastest forward in the competition. Papakura were heavily defeated once more. Richmond scored 12 tries, with three to George Mitchell who was the best forward on the ground, and two each to Alf Broadhead and Bernard Lowther (snr). While Wally Tittleton was outstanding being involved in every try scoring movement at centre. For Papakura Glynn Wellm scored a try and kicked a penalty and set up their other try for Ray Halsey. For Richmond a recent recruit, William Nathaniel Clarke Craig made his debut but appears to have only played the one game. He was originally from the Manawatu area but had spent time in Wellington where he played club rugby. He moved to Northland soon after where he was living with his wife and daughter and then was drafted into the war effort and was killed on September 23, 1944. Newton over turned a 0-3 half time deficit to win 10–8. Mount Albert's first half points came when Les Clement made a break and Hucker gathered the ball up close to the line and crossed. Newton scored tries to James Silva and Charles Everitt to get the win with Harry Emus converting both. Everitt's try came when Silva made a break and sent it to Burton to Everitt. The latter was usually a forward but playing at centre three-quarter. Silva's try came when he ran 50 yards to score. Clement scored a late try for Mount Albert which Colin Cowley converted. Maurice Quirke out hooked Mount Albert's M Smythe and gave Newton an advantage in possession. Both fullbacks, H Kendall for Newton and Carter for Mount Albert played well.

9 August	Manukau	7-2 (0-2)	City	Carlaw Park 1
3:00	Try: Joe Murray; Con: Jack Hemi; Pen: Jack Hemi		Drop: Warwick Clarke	Referee: J O'Shannessey

9 August	Newton	10-8 (0-3)	Mount Albert	Carlaw Park 1
1:45	Try: Charles Everitt, James Silva; Con: Harry Emus 2		Try: Hucker, Les Clement; Con: Colin Cowley	Referee: Jack Donovan

9 August	Richmond	46-8 (26-2)	Papakura	Carlaw Park 2
1:45	Try: George Mitchell 3, Bernard Lowther 2, Alf Broadhead 2, Alan Sayers, C Williams, Wally Tittleton, Dave Solomon, John Crookall; Con: Charles Webb 4, Alf Broadhead		Try: Ray Halsey, Glynn Wellm; Pen: Glynn Wellm	Referee: J Jones

9 August	North Shore	23-3 (20-0)	Marist	Carlaw Park 2
3:00	Try: Roy Clark, Tom Field, Eric Chatham, J McArthur, Bruce Graham; Con: Dick Smith 3 Pen: Dick Smith		Try: Taripo	Referee: George Kelly

==== Round 14 ====
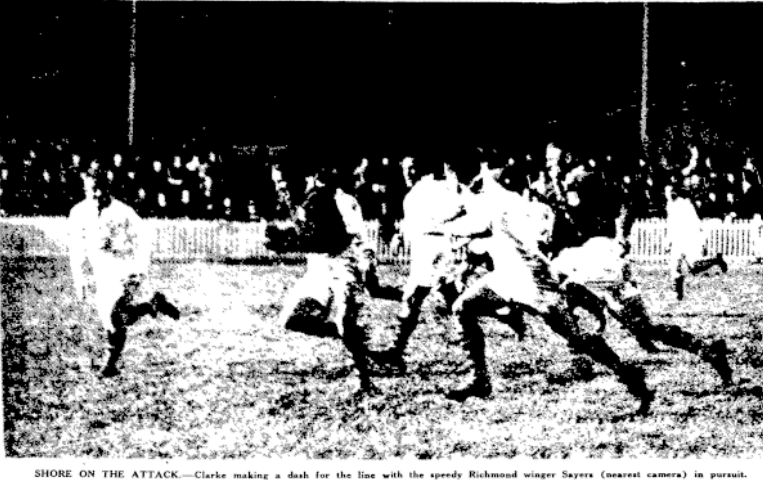
Second five-eighth, Roy Clark (North Shore Albions) making a break, with Alan Sayers (Richmond) in pursuit near the camera. Clark would go on to represent New Zealand in 1946. Sayers had represented New Zealand in the 1938 British Empire Games in sprinting and also played representative rugby for Waikato.

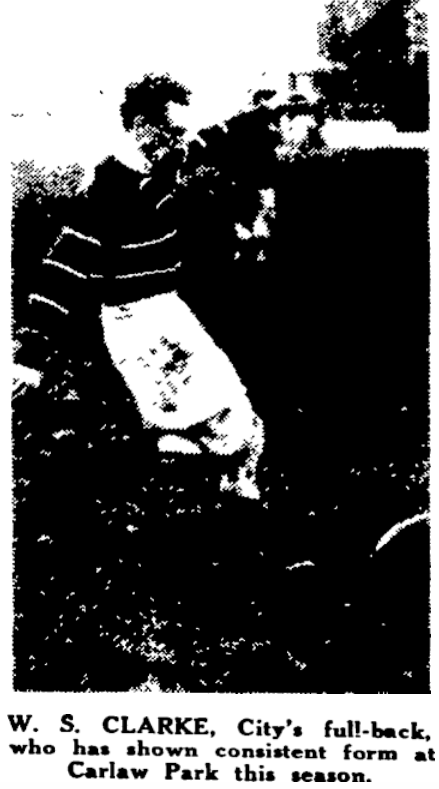

Richmond fielded C Williams at halfback and Charles Webb at first five eighth in a slight rearrangement. The combination worked well and North Shore concentrated their efforts on crowding Dave Solomon at second five eighth. Despite this he was making breaks and getting his three quarters going. North Shore were defending well enough and Dick Smith at fullback and Verdun Scott at centre "were seldom at fault". Roy Clark broke through and kicked ahead before regathering and sending the ball to Clarrie Petersen. He sent it back to Clark who had a clear run in but Wally Tittleton saved with a diving tackle. Then Solomon broke away, and Tittleton passed to Alan Sayers who used his speed to score at the corner. In the second half McArthur began opening up play for Shore and Jack Greenwood and Owen Wilkie on the wings were benefiting. Eventually after their forwards hammered away five eighth Clark got across and Richmond then did their best to reply but the Shore backs held them out and near the end they moved play up the other end with McArthur "whipping a blind side pass for Greenwood" who scored in the corner to complete the 10–3 win. Papakura recorded their first and last win of the season when they defeated City 5–2. They trailed in a "ragged" game 0–2 at halftime but a try to Burgess in the second half when the five eighth kicked through and regathered and beat Clarke earned them the win. During the second half a forward movement for City was led by Kokaua, a Fijian forward who had been showing form during the game. Though it is more likely he was from the Cook Islands due to his surname. City were missing regular players Jack Silva, Robert Grotte, Jim Gould, Owen Hughes, and Eugene Donovan, and usual forward Bill Jackson played on the wing. Despite this Papakura were said to deserve their win with Craig Smith playing a solid game at fullback and Glynn Wellm attacking well on the wing while in the loose their forward Pinfold and T Hogan "were noticeable for splendid work". Newton beat Marist 11–9 with the heavy conditions hampering play, especially in the second half. For Newton Burton scored two tries. While Marist were unable to convert any of their three tries which ultimately cost them. Ponsonby trailed Mount Albert 0–3 at halftime but outplayed their opponents in the second half with the young Bob Scott playing an excellent game at fullback once again giving "a fine exhibition of positional play". A novel event happened during the weekend when Manukau, who were on their bye, played at Te Kohanga in a game of rugby union. They played under the name of 'Tamaki Rugby' team. The match was to assist (Princess) Te Puea Hērangi in raising funds for the New Zealand Māori Red Cross Society with a dance being held in the Te Kohanga Hall in the evening with music supplied by the T.P.M. orchestra from Ngaruawahia. ‘Manukau’ won by 37 points to 6 and the day also raised £56. Former Manukau player and New Zealand representative Jack Brodrick made his first appearance for the season.

16 August	North Shore	10-3 (2-3)	Richmond	Carlaw Park 1
3:00	Try: Roy Clark, Jack Greenwood; Con: Dick Smith, Verdun Scott		Try: Alan Sayers	Referee: George Kelly

16 August	Ponsonby	10-6 (0-3)	Mount Albert	Carlaw Park 1
1:40	Try: Hughes, Des Williams; Con: Arthur Kay; Pen: Arthur Kay		Try: Moore, Jack Tristram	Referee: Jack Donovan

16 August	Newton	11-9 (8-6)	Marist	Carlaw Park 2
3:00	Try: Burton 2, Harry Emus; Con: Harry Emus		Try: Simpson, Dave McWilliams, Smith	Referee: Emmet Pope

16 August	Papakura	5-2 (0-2)	City	Carlaw Park 2
1:40	Try: Burgess; Con: Glynn Wellm		Try: Warwick Clarke	Referee: H Tate

==== Round 15 ====
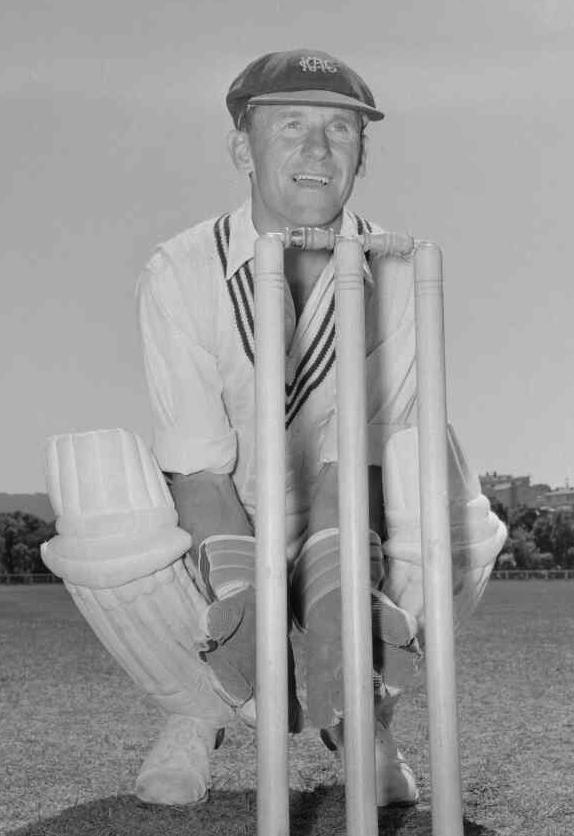
Verdun Scott was back from military leave and kicked a goal for North Shore.

Richmond were missing Dave Solomon who was out through injury in their 15–8 loss to Manukau. Charles Webb played in his place at first five eighth with Wally Tittleton shifting in from centre three quarter to second five eighth. For Manukau Tommy Chase was unavailable and forward W Martin took his place on the wing and played an excellent game. Manukau scored an early try with Pita Ririnui and Jack Hemi combining to send Joe Murray in under the posts. Richmond replied later when W Martin failed to clear near his line and Bernard Lowther swept up to kick over the line and win the race to the ball. Ted Mincham who was making a now rare appearance for Richmond was injured and replaced by Alan Sayers. Following a Hemi penalty Sayers kicked high and Charles Webb chased through to score to make the score 7–6 to Manukau at the interval. In the second half Hemi scored a brilliant solo try. He got the ball in loose play near his own line and cut through to Jack Magill the Richmond fullback, he beat him "with a change of pace and a side step" and then ran 50 yards being chased by winger Lyndsay Jack to score and receive an ovation from the crowd. Towards the end of the game Aubrey Thompson who was playing a great game in the Manukau forwards led an attack and Wiremu Te Tai eluded the defense to score. North Shore's first try came when Roy Clark gathered a loose clearing kick and passed to loose forward Clarrie Petersen who used his renowned pace to run in for a try. Verdun Scott who was still on military leave converted. In the second half Scott moved to the wing after receiving a knock to his shoulder and Greenwood came into centre three quarter. From a set scrum McArthur raced around the blind side and gave it to Scott who went in for a try. Mount Albert retaliated when Colin Cowley used his speed to beat Dick Smith and give to Basil Cranch to score. North Shore finished the game off though when Scott broke away, passed to Greenwood who "cleverly evaded the defence" and sent Eric Chatham over. On the #2 field Newton came back from 5–8 down at halftime to win. Harry Emus was impressive once again in his first season of senior football and he crossed for a great try in the corner which he converted and then later Harry Burton went over. James Silva their five eighth was carried off injured. The Ponsonby halfback Des Williams scored a nice try in the corner and when Arthur Kay converted from the sideline Ponsonby had a chance but despite "strenuous efforts" could not score with Newton winning 15–13. In an uninspiring game Marist beat Papakura 9–3 with future All Black prop, Johnny Simpson scoring Marist's third try.

23 August	Manukau	15-8 (7-6)	Richmond	Carlaw Park 1
3:00	Try: Joe Murray, Jack Hemi, Wiremu Te Tai; Con: Jack Hemi 2 Pen: Jack Hemi		Try: Bernard Lowther, Charles Webb; Pen: Bernard Lowther	Referee: Jack Donovan

23 August	North Shore	11-3 (5-0)	Mount Albert	Carlaw Park 1
1:40	Try: Clarrie Peterson, Verdun Scott, Eric Chatham; Con: Verdun Scott		Try: Basil Cranch	Referee: J Jones

23 August	Marist	9-3 (3-0)	Papakura	Carlaw Park 2
1:40	Try: Tim O’Gorman, Johnny Simpson, Taripo		Try: Glynn Wellm	Referee: George Kelly

23 August	Newton	15-13 (5-8)	Ponsonby	Carlaw Park 2
3:00	Try: Jack Ginders, Harry Emus, Harry Burton; Con: Harry Emus 2 Pen: Harry Emus		Try: Hughes, Brian Riley, Des Williams; Con: Arthur Kay 2	Referee: H Tate

==== Round 16 ====
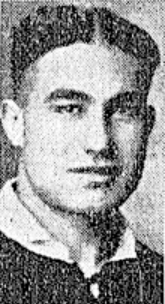
Hawea Mataira was City's best forward.

Verdun Scott of North Shore had gone back to camp and Owen Wilkie replaced him at centre. City Rovers signed Takapuna rugby wing three quarter Henry Rogan who debuted on the right wing, while Laurance Naughton, a North Shore rugby played joined North Shore Albions and played at centre three-quarter. Naughton was said to have handled the ball well, run straight and passed on to his wings "with good judgment" and also defended soundly. North Shore opened the scoring when Eric Chatham made a run down the wing and when challenged by Jim Gould passed infield to Bruce Graham who sent it to Clarrie Petersen who ran a clear path to score with Dick Smith converting. North Shore attacked again and when Warwick Clarke failed to clear Owen Wilkie gathered in the ball and crossed with Smith again converting. Rogan was running hard for City and when he "made a big run" Bill Jackson got over for a try. Clarke's conversion made the halftime score 10–5 to Shore. Petersen scored his second after a run by Greenwood and centering pass, before City replied when Jim Gould beat Greenwood to the ball using "sheer speed" and then ran diagonally to score between the posts. City strove hard to win the game with Hawea Mataira their standout forward but North Shore was winning most of the scrum ball and they hung on to win. Newton scored their 5th consecutive win for one of the rare times in their clubs history. Richmond was missing Dave Solomon, Lyndsay Jack, Leo Davis, Alf Broadhead, and Maurice Potter. The play was described as "ragged" and the only points in the first half were two penalties to Harry Emus for Newton who had a 4–0 halftime lead. Richmond made some good attacks in their backs with Alan Sayers showing his speed but a poor pass to him from Ted Mincham cost him a try before halftime. In an unusual incident the referee (George Kelly) held play up for a few minutes when H Kendall, the Newton fullback had a torn jersey replaced. Kendall was said to have played his best game of the season. In the second half James Silva and Harry Burton were involved in two big attacking movements for Newton but they did not result in any points. Near the end of the game from a set scrum Green passed to Edgar Tredea who ran straight and passed to forward Maurice Quirke who "took a difficult pass well to score a great try". Quirke was in his ninth season for Newton and it was a rare try for him, when his career ended a year later he finished with 12 from 10 seasons. The veteran also ended up playing five games for Auckland from 1934 to 1942. Just before full time Richmond's captain, George Mitchell went off injured. Marist had a 9–0 win over Ponsonby. Their first try came when J Smith crossed for an easy try when Murphy, a Ponsonby three-quarter threw a wild pass. Smith on the wing "played a fine game" and was "involved in every movement". Ponsonby had several chances to score with Arthur Kay involved in many of them along with W Briggs but they were all result less. Then near the end Marist drove down the sideline and James scored. In promoting the game between Manukau and Papakura the Auckland Rugby League wrote what a thrill it would be for Papakura to win. They oversold their chances with Manukau winning 43–2 after leading 17–2 at halftime. Jack Hemi scored three tries and Joe Murray also had a field day scoring four. W Butler on the wing scored two, while Ivan Gregory and Wiremu Te Tai scored one each with Steve Watene completing the scoring with two conversions. The score could have been much worse for Papakura had Manukau converted more than five of their 11 tries. Murray had now scored 21 tries in senior competition games for Manukau with almost all while playing in the inside backs.

30 August	North Shore	13-10 (10-5)	City	Carlaw Park 1
3:00	Try: Clarrie Peterson 2, Owen Wilkie; Con: Dick Smith 2		Try: Bill Jackson, Jim Gould; Con: Warwick Clarke	Referee: Emmet Pope

30 August	Newton	7-0 (4-0)	Richmond	Carlaw Park 1
1:40	Try: Maurice Quirke; Pen: Harry Emus 2			Referee: George Kelly

30 August	Marist	9-0 (3-0)	Ponsonby	Carlaw Park 2
3:00	Try: J Smith 2, James			Referee: Owen Chalmers

30 August	Manukau	43-2 (17-2)	Papakura	Carlaw Park 2
1:40	Try: Joe Murray 4, Jack Hemi 3, W Butler 2, Gregory, Wiremu Te Tai; Con: Jack Hemi 3, Steve Watene 2		Pen: R Seymour	Referee: Jack Donovan

==== Round 17 ====
The Auckland representative team was playing South Auckland in Huntly at the same time as the Carlaw Park matches were on. It had been arranged that 3 teams would have a bye to allow for enough talent to be in the Auckland team. They were Mount Albert, Richmond, and Marist. There was supposed to be a match between City and Ponsonby played at Carlaw Park 2, however it appears that these teams decided not to play the match as they were both out of championship contention. During the week the Auckland Star published a piece on Claude List who was remarkably now in his 29th season of rugby league. He had debuted at the senior level for the Kingsland Rovers in 1921. He remained with them for many years and was selected to play for Auckland and New Zealand despite the fact that they were a senior B side. He was the first player ever to do this. After Kingsland amalgamated with Grafton and then essentially folded he joined Marist, and then Mount Albert who he was currently playing with. For the second week in a row Joe Murray scored four tries in Manukau's easy win over Newton. At second five eighth he used "rugged" running to "often break through strong tackling". Jack Hemi at first five eighth scored 17 points through a try, six conversions and a penalty. His penalty opened the scoring and was kicked from two yards inside the half. The Auckland Star remarked that Steve Watene held the ball in place for the kick which was something that had never been seen before at Carlaw Park. For Newton Harry Emus went off injured at halftime and was replaced for Frank Zimmerman who went into the forwards with Charles Everitt coming out into the backs. Laurent and Jack Ginders scored Newton's only tries. With only two games on Papakura had the opportunity to play on the #1 field at Carlaw Park for the first time in the year. In the first half they lock Hancock their fullback to injury and he was replaced by K. Smith, while Brown, a North Shore forward went off and was replaced by Allan Seagar (known as "Lar") the coach who had retired at the end of 1935 but made one appearance as an emergency in 1938 and now again in 1941. Jack Smith was on leave from the army and scored a try and kicked four conversions in their 35–5 win. He played in his old position of fullback, replacing his older brother Dick who had come out of retirement to fill in for him and in four games kicked seven goals.

6 September	Manukau	41-8 (25-3)	Newton	Carlaw Park 1
3:00	Try: Joe Murray 4, W Butler, Aubrey Thompson, George Shilton, Wiremu Te Tai, Jack Hemi; Con: Jack Hemi 6 Pen: Jack Hemi		Try: Jack Ginders, Laurent; Con: Edgar Tredea	Referee: J O’Shannessey

6 September	North Shore	35-5 (11-5)	Papakura	Carlaw Park 1
1:40	Try: J McArthur 2, Eric Chatham 2, J Greenwood, Horace Hunt, Jack Smith, Clarrie Peterson, Thomas Field; Con: Jack Smith 4		Try: H Hogan; Con: Glynn Wellm	Referee: Owen Chalmers

6 September	City	Not Played	Ponsonby	Carlaw Park 2
1:40

==== Round 18 ====
After round 18 had been completed North Shore Albions had secured the title ahead of Manukau after their 19–9 win over Newton. Newton threatened to ruin North Shore's title hopes when they led the early game on the #1 field by 7 to 2 at halftime however North Shore came home strongly scoring 17 points in the second half to end Manukau's championship aspirations. Newton played brilliantly in the first half, particularly the backs with Green at halfback, James Silva and Harry Burton in the five eighths prominent. Their try came when Silva sent it on to Burton who "cut the defence to ribbons, midst excitement, who sent it on to Brady who raced between the posts" with Edgar Tredea converting. North Shore had chances to score but could not get over the line and used "barging" tactics. Jack Smith missed a penalty attempt and their nervous supporters "howled". Early in the second half J McArthur and Roy Clark raced clear and the supporting lock, Clarrie Petersen took a pass to run in under the posts with Smith's conversion leveling the scores. The play of Clark at five eighths really turned the match around. There was a lot of excitement in the crowd now and a Smith penalty gave them a 9–7 lead. L Naughton, their centre raced through and gave it to Jack Greenwood whose speed took it on another 30 yards before Eric Chatham took the ball and scored a brilliant try in the corner. Tredea narrowed the score with a penalty but then Smith made it 14–9 with a drop goal. Naughton then made a brilliant solo effort but a forward pass to Chatham ruined the try but then on full time the result was sealed when Clark scored and Smith converted. It was the sixth championship for North Shore and ultimately to be their last with the club failing to win any more until they folded in 2005 after an existence of 96 years. Despite knowing their chance to win the championship was gone Manukau still played strongly to beat Mount Albert 33–18. Joe Murray was missing from the backline with Peter Awhitu coming in to the win and Tommy Chase moving into the five eighths to partner Jack Hemi. Chase scored a try and Hemi kicked six goals to continue his point scoring streak. Ivan Gregory at centre three quarter scored a try. Manukau won the Thistle Cup by scoring 360 points to North Shore's 304. Papakura was more competitive in their 12–9 loss to Ponsonby. Ponsonby led 9–6 at halftime with Glynn Wellm kicking three penalties for Papakura. Ponsonby had scored three unconverted tries with Arthur Kay missing all three attempts and then going off with an injury shortly before halftime. Trevor Hosken raced through for a try for Papakura just after the restart to level the scores 9-9. Branford, the Papakura five eighth was injured and carried from the field. Ponsonby won the game when Dacre Black, Carr, and Brian Riley handled the ball and then sent it to Hughes who scored in the corner. Bob Scott now had the kicking duties but he too missed and the game finished shortly after with Ponsonby nearly scoring again but George Funnell was pushed out in the corner preventing him from scoring a hat trick. John Donald came out of retirement to help the City team after not having played since 1939. He played 29 games for them from 1937 to 39 and played 49 games for North Shore from 1933 to 1936. Donald also represented Auckland in eight games from 1933 to 1937. City led the game 2–0 over Marist at half time. After the break Warwick Clarke moved from the full back position for City to centre three-quarter and sending Jack Silva to full back. But their opponents still came back to win 8–5 after Dave McWilliams and Don McLeod scored tries and Vic Barchard converted one. City's lone try came in the final moments of the game when recent convert winger Henry Rogan scored. It came after Bob Grotte playing against his former team passed to him on halfway and Rogan ran 50 yards to score in the terrace corner after playing a "great game on the wing". For Marist the outstanding forward was said to be Don McLeod.

13 September	Manukau	33-18 (17-10)	Mount Albert	Carlaw Park 1
3:00	Try: Ivan Gregory 2, Pita Ririnui, Wiremu Te Tai, Tommy Chase, Peter Awhitu, W Butler; Con: Jack Hemi 5 Pen: Jack Hemi		Try: Colin Cowley, Jack Tristram, Sanderson, Les Clement; Con: Les Clement 2, Basil Cranch	Referee: George Kelly

13 September	North Shore	19-9 (2-7)	Newton	Carlaw Park 1
1:40	Try: Clarrie Peterson, Eric Chatham, Roy Clark; Con: Jack Smith 2 Pen: Jack Smith 2 Drop: Jack Smith		Try: Brady; Con: Edgar Tredea; Pen: Edgar Tredea 2	Referee: Jack Donovan

13 September	Marist	8-5	City	Carlaw Park 2
3:00	Try: Don McLeod, Dave McWilliams; Con: Len Barchard		Try: H Rogan; Pen: Warwick Clarke	Referee: A Pearson

13 September	Ponsonby	12-9 (9-6)	Papakura	Carlaw Park 2
1:40	Try: George Funnell 2, Dacre Black, Brian Riley		Try: Trevor Hosken; Pen: Glynn Wellm 3	Referee: T Evans

=== Roope Rooster ===
It was decided to include 10 teams in the Roope Rooster competition which would be the 9 teams from the Fox Memorial competition and Otahuhu Rovers who had won the senior B competition. The first round included the 3 lowest placed teams from the Fox Memorial championship and Otahuhu.

==== Round 1 ====
The 2 matches were played as curtain raisers to the Auckland Māori v Auckland Pākehā match. Marist opened the scoring in their win over Mount Albert when Maurice Costello beat half a dozen players and scored a brilliant try with John Anderson converting. A while later Costello raced over for his second and Anderson's conversion gave them a 10–0 halftime lead. Early in the second half Claude List ran over for a try after fellow loose forward Jack Tristram had made a 40-yard run. List was remarkably in his seventeenth season of first grade rugby league. He had debuted for Kingsland Rovers in 1925 before transferring to Marist Old Boys in 1931 and then Mount Albert in 1934. He ended his career with 184 club games, 25 for Auckland and 4 for New Zealand. During the second half Mervyn Hucker (Mount Albert), and Bill Breed (Marist) were sent off by referee Emmet Pope. Marist was having the better of the play but Anderson missed two penalties, then right at the end Les Clement broke away and sent Carter across to score. Basil Cranch missed the conversion attempt once again and the game finished 10–6. Otahuhu had an impressive win over Papakura. Blockley scored two tries for them while C.W. Allen achieved the same feat and kicked a penalty goal. Jimmy Mullins at five eighth scored a try and converted two of their seven tries. Another try scorer for them was Reginald Martin, the older brother of Ralph Martin the Manukau fullback who was playing for Auckland Māori later on the same day at Carlaw Park. Reginald was awarded the Dickson Medal this season for sportsmanship. For Papakura their only try went to Bradford.

20 September	Marist	10-6 (10-0)	Mount Albert	Carlaw Park 1
1:45	Try: Maurice Costello 2 Con: John Anderson 2		Try: Claude List, Carter	Attendance: 6,000; Referee: Emmet Pope

20 September	Otahuhu	25-5 (12-5)	Papakura	Carlaw Park 2
1:45	Try: Blockley 2, Reginald Martin, A McManus, Jimmy Mullins; Con: Jimmy Mullins 2, C.W. Allan 2 Pen: C.W. Allan		Try: Bradford; Pen: Butler	Attendance: 6,000; Referee: J O’Shannessey

==== Round 2 ====
Marist upset Richmond in their match 11–10 with John Anderson scoring all of their points through a try, conversion, 2 penalties and a “sensational” drop goal which won the match. George Tittleton made his first appearance for Richmond since 1938. During the second half Richmond forward Maurice Metcalfe broke his leg when leading a forward rush near midfield and had to be carried off leaving them a player short. Later in the half Cyril Wiberg, the Marist halfback left the field injured and Anderson came out of the scrum to assist the backs by playing on the wing. It was from this position that he kicked a "fairly long range" drop goal to secure victory. Future All Black Bob Scott kicked 2 goals for Ponsonby. He switched to rugby union during World War 2 while in the forces and later became a prominent All Black. Brian Riley was brilliant on the wing for Ponsonby and scored two tries. His first came when he "raced round Owen Wilkie, veered in-field and swept past two other defenders leaving Waite the full back grasping for space". Joe Murray once again scored four tries for Manukau, continuing his record breaking try scoring season. Likewise Jack Hemi continued to score at a high rate with a try, six conversions and two penalties, well on his way to the 200 point mark. Roy Niwa scored Newton's lone points through a penalty. Newton promoted Burton and Hale from their juniors and both played "a sound game". City only just beat Otahuhu by 13 points to 12 with a drop goal by Alan Donovan handing them the win late in the match. Joffre Johnson played in the forwards for Otahuhu though it is likely he debuted a week before alongside his brother Norm Johnson. Joffre played for New Zealand in 1947. During the first half he put in a centering kick which A. McManus scored from.

27 September	Marist	11-10 (4-7)	Richmond	Carlaw Park 1
3:00	Try: John Anderson; Con: John Anderson; Pen: John Anderson 2 Drop: John Anderson		Try: Dave Solomon, Ted Mincham; Con: Charles Webb; Pen: Charles Webb	Referee: George Kelly

27 September	Ponsonby	16-8 (6-0)	North Shore	Carlaw Park 1
1:45	Try: Brian Riley 2, Dacre Black, Carr; Con: Bob Scott; Pen: Bob Scott		Try: J McArthur, G Brown; Con: Roy Clark	Referee: Jack Donovan

27 September	City	13-12 (5-12)	Otahuhu	Carlaw Park 2
3:00	Try: Jack Silva, Jim Gould, Peter McManus; Pen: Alan Donovan; Drop: Alan Donovan		Try: R Milligan, A McManus; Con: Jimmy Mullins 2 Pen: Jimmy Mullins	Referee: Emmet Pope

27 September	Manukau	52-2 (22-0)	Newton	Carlaw Park 2
1:45	Try: Joe Murray 4, N Martin, Butler 2, Jack Hemi, W Martin, Aubrey Thompson, George Shilton, Ivan Gregory; Con: Jack Hemi 6 Pen: Jack Hemi 2		Pen: Roy Niwa	Referee: Jack Hawkes

==== Semifinals ====
Arthur Kay played an outstanding game for Ponsonby in their 24–13 win over Marist. He played at centre three-quarter, moving out from the five eighths where he had mostly played in recent seasons. He scored two tries and opened up play for his wings Brian Riley and Hughes who each scored a try. His first try came when he had to run past Marist full back Cyril Wiberg while his second was from an intercept where he ran 50 yards to score. Despite losing the Marist backs played well with Benny Crocker at half back getting the ball away well to Maurice Costello who showed speed off the mark and Gerry Hughes and Dave McWilliams linked well further out. McWilliams was unlucky not to score twice, the first was when he followed up on Bob Scott and blocked his clearing kick to score but the referee ruled a knock on rather than a charge down. The other came when he crossed but was ruled off side. Manukau continued their excellent scoring form crossing for four tries in a 20–11 win over City. Ivan Gregory was good at centre three-quarter with his "hard straight running" which gave Tommy Chase and W Butler on the wings a lot of opportunities. Joe Murray scored once again and Jack Hemi kicked eight points. The young star, Warwick Clarke scored all of City's points from a try and four penalties at fullback. he would go on to be one of the most prolific point scorers for New Zealand in the late 1940s.

4 October	Ponsonby	24-13	Marist	Carlaw Park 1
3:00	Try: Arthur Kay 2, Brian Riley, Hughes; Con: Arthur Kay 2, Bob Scott; Pen: Arthur Kay, Bob Scott 2		Try: Johnny Simpson, J Smith, Bill Breed; Con: John Anderson 2	Referee: Jack Donovan

4 October	Manukau	20-11	City	Carlaw Park 1
1:40	Try: Thew, Ivan Gregory, Joe Murray, W Butler; Con: Jack Hemi 2 Pen: Jack Hemi 2		Try: Warwick Clarke; Pen: Warwick Clarke 4	Referee: H Tate

==== Final ====
Manukau won the Roope Rooster competition with a comfortable win over Ponsonby. Their backs showed superior play and combination. It was reported after the game that Jack Hemi had broken the goal kicking record in senior rugby league with 160 points from kicks. He broke the previous record of Bill Davidson who scored 136 points in 1921. However Davidson's total included all club matches and Auckland representative matches. Joe Murray's try came when he showed his elusiveness making a run from midfield and coming to Bob Scott beat him with a fast side-step. Manukau forward George Shilton scored a great try after Ralph Martin at full back started a movement which saw five backs and two forwards handle to score "one of the finest tries seen this year". However, later in the game Shilton was sent from the field by referee Jack Donovan. Forwards Pita Ririnui, Aubrey Thompson, Steve Watene and Wiremua Te Tai were very good in the forwards for Manukau. In the Ponsonby side Arthur Kay, Brian Riley and Bob Scott all played well in the three quarters and at full back but they were outclassed in the five eighths. Their best forwards were Huck Flanagan, Allen Laird, and W Briggs who had impressed all season for Ponsonby.

11 October	Manukau	28-10 (12-4)	Ponsonby	Carlaw Park 1
3:15	Try: George Shilton, Aubrey Thompson, W Butler, Joe Murray, Pita Ririnui, Ivan Gregory; Con: Jack Hemi 3 Pen: Jack Hemi 2		Try: Arthur Kay, Brian Riley; Pen: Bob Scott 2	Referee: Jack Donovan

=== Phelan Shield ===
==== Round 1 ====
The first match in the Phelan Shield was played between Mount Albert and Papakura who had both been eliminated in the first round of the Roope Rooster. It was played at Fowld's Park in Morningside, the home ground of Mount Albert. The score was reported but no scoring details were provided.

27 September	Mount Albert	38-8	Papakura	Fowld’s Park, Morningside
3:00	Try: Unknown 38 points		Try: Unknown 8 points	Referee: A Pearson

==== Round 2 ====
Richmond beat a competitive Otahuhu side 18–14 with four tries including one to Ted Mincham who had debuted for Richmond 14 seasons earlier in 1928. Riddell converted three of their tries. For Otahuhu, Kenneth Finlayson scored a try after moving back to his junior club after having played at Marist since 1936. His father was a New Zealand rugby league and cricket representative. At full back for Otahuhu was C.W. Allan who was said to have impressed for the 3rd week in a row. Colin Cowley scored three tries for Mount Albert while Les Clement and Basil Cranch both scored doubles. Veteran Newton forward, Maurice Quirke now in his 9th season scored twice for Newton.

4 October	Richmond	18-14	Otahuhu	Carlaw Park 2
3:00	Try: H McIntosh, Leo Davis, Wally Tittleton, Ted Mincham; Con: Riddell 3		Try: Kenneth Finlayson, Norm Johnson; Con: C.W. Allan; Pen: C.W. Allan 3	Referee: A Pearson

4 October	Mount Albert	29-15	Newton	Carlaw Park 2
1:40	Try: Colin Cowley 3, Les Clement 2, Basil Cranch 2 Con: Basil Cranch; Pen: Bert Leatherbarrow 3		Try: Maurice Quirke 2, Hall; Con: Edgar Tredea 2 Pen: H Kendall	Referee: Emmet Pope

==== Semifinals ====
George Tittleton kicked a penalty in their 13–7 win over City in his second game back for them where his brother Wally Tittleton had been a stalwart for several seasons. A Thomas debuted in the Richmond backs after switching from rugby union but was injured in the first half and left the field. Also on proper debut was a promoted Richmond junior, William Kinney who would go on to play several seasons of first grade football for them in the five eighths. He had in fact played in their senior preliminary round game on April 19 and scored a try but dropped back to the juniors thereafter. He impressed with his "lively" play, speed, and straight running. Dave Solomon did not come on until the start of the second half and played in the three quarters for a while and then went to full back. City had serious difficulty fielding a team for their match with Richmond and started two men short and were missing full back Warwick Clarke. Sinclair, a junior played in the three quarters and kicked a conversion and a penalty.

11 October	Richmond	13-7 (10-2)	City	Carlaw Park 1
1:40	Try: H McIntosh, Bernard Lowther, Ted Mincham; Con: Bernard Lowther; Pen: George Tittleton		Try: Peter McManus; Con: Sinclair; Pen: Sinclair	Referee: George Kelly

11 October	Mount Albert	21-12	North Shore	Carlaw Park 2
3:00	Try: Claude List, Les Clement, Carter, Tommy Hetherington, Bradford; Con: Les Clement; Pen: Les Clement, Bert Leatherbarrow		Try: Eric Chatham, Penman; Pen: Dick Smith 3	Referee: J O’Shannessey

==== Final ====
Colin Cowley at centre shone for Mount Albert and Les Clement at halfback opened up play for the winners brilliantly. Cowley scored a brilliant try with a run from halfway.

18 October	Mount Albert	8-7	Richmond	Carlaw Park 1
1:40	Try: Tommy Hetherington, Colin Cowley; Con: Les Clement		Try: Maurice Potter; Pen: Charles Webb 2	Attendance: 12,000; Referee: George Kelly

=== Stormont Shield ===
==== Final ====
Manukau won the Stormont Shield for the first time in their history before a crowd of 12,000 at Carlaw Park to complete a strong season where they finished runner up in the championship and winners of the Roope Rooster and Stormont Shield. At the conclusion of the game Bill Stormont's family presented the team with medals and the Stormont Shield named in honour of their son, who had died at the age of 26 in 1925 from rheumatic heart disease. Ross Jones made his first appearance for North Shore since he returned from the aborted New Zealand tour of England in 1939. He had returned to his farm at Matakana and not played since. He showed "splendid form" packing down at lock "and being a fine leader in loose play". He had taken Clarrie Petersen's position who had moved to centre three quarter where he played a great game scoring both of North Shore's tries using his famous pace. It had made him the standout loose forward in Auckland during the season. North Shore led at halftime by 10 points to 9 after a "fiery display" from the North Shore forwards which disorganised Manukau. However Manukau dominated the second half scoring 21 points to 0. Manukau captain Jack Hemi completed his historic season by scoring two tries and kicking three conversions and three penalties for 18 points. One try came after he beat half a dozen North Shore players "in an elusive run". Joe Murray scored his 31st try of the senior season which was easily a record for first grade tries in Auckland Rugby League to this point. Dick Smith played his last ever game for North Shore after coming out of retirement to assist the side. He kicked a conversion and penalty for them.

18 October	Manukau	30-10	North Shore	Carlaw Park
3:00	Try: Jack Hemi 2, Pita Ririnui, Ivan Gregory, Joe Murray, W Butler; Con: Jack Hemi 3 Pen: Jack Hemi 3		Try: Clarrie Peterson 2 Con: Dick Smith; Pen: Dick Smith	Attendance: 12,000; Referee: Jack Donovan

=== Top try scorers and point scorers ===
The try and point scoring lists were made up from the preliminary round games, the championship, Roope Rooster, Phelan Shield and Stormont Shield games. Joe Murray of Manukau scored a remarkable 32 tries which was a record for a season. His teammate Jack Hemi also broke the record for the most points in a season, finishing with 208 which was well ahead of the previous record set by Bill Davidson in 1921. Despite only playing 13 games Jack Smith (North Shore) still managed to bring up 100 points. He missed several games as he was in camp at Papakura before going away to war. Clarrie Petersen, the North Shore loose forward scored 21 tries which was likely a record for a forward in senior club rugby league in Auckland. Two of his tries came when he was filling in in their backs late in the season but the rest were whilst in the forwards.

Top try scorers
Rk	Player	Team	Games	Tries
1	Joe Murray	Manukau	20	32
2	W Butler	Manukau	22	22
3=	Clarrie Petersen	North Shore	20	21
3=	Alan Sayers	Richmond	14	19
5	Harry Emus	Newton	16	13
6	Jack Hemi	Manukau	19	12
7	J McArthur	North Shore	19	11
8=	Basil Cranch	Mount Albert	15	10
8=	Arthur Kay	Ponsonby	20	10
8=	J Smith	Marist	18	10
8=	John Anderson	Marist	14	10
8=	Roy Clark	North Shore	20	10

Top point scorers
Rk	Player	Team	G	T	C	P	DG	Pts
1	Jack Hemi	Manukau	19	12	59	27	0	208
2	Jack Smith	North Shore	13	2	30	16	1	100
3	Joe Murray	Manukau	20	32	0	1	0	98
4	Arthur Kay	Ponsonby	20	10	20	13	0	96
5	Harry Emus	Newton	16	13	13	13	0	91
6	John Anderson	Marist	14	10	16	11	1	86
7	W Butler	Manukau	22	22	1	2	0	72
8	Charles Webb	Richmond	18	2	26	6	0	70
9	Warwick Clarke	City	16	2	11	19	0	68
10	Clarrie Petersen	North Shore	20	21	0	1	0	65

== Senior B grade/Reserve grade competition ==
With senior teams depleted by the large numbers of players going away to war the Auckland Rugby League decided to merge the reserve grade and senior B grade. The competition was generally reported as “senior B” but was named “reserve grade” at times as well. The fixtures were not listed apart from the first 2 weeks so few venues or referees are known and very few results were reported either. In early June it was reported at the board of control meeting that “several senior B teams had defaulted” and “it was decided to refer the matter to the junior control board for a report”.

=== Standings ===
Team	Pld	W	D	L	F	A	Pts
Otahuhu Rovers senior B	7	7	0	0	97	26	14
Ellerslie United senior B	10	7	0	3	88	46	14
Mount Albert United reserves	6	4	0	2	48	39	8
North Shore Albions reserves	6	3	0	3	56	39	6
Richmond Rovers reserves	4	2	1	1	32	21	5
Northcote & Birkenhead Ramblers senior B	3	2	0	1	23	17	4
Point Chevalier senior B	4	1	0	3	18	57	2
Ponsonby United reserves	7	0	1	6	29	65	1
Manukau reserves	3	0	0	3	2	26	0

=== Results ===
	Date		Score		Score	Referee	Venue
Round 1	17 May	Point Chevalier	10	Ellerslie	13	?	Auckland Domain 2, 3:00
-	17 May	Mount Albert	8	Ponsonby	0	?	Victoria Park 1, 3:00
-	17 May	North Shore	?	City	?	?	Devonport Domain, 3:00
-	17 May	Newton	?	?	?	?	Auckland Domain, 3:00
Round 2	24 May	City	?	Manukau	?	J Gedye	Auckland Domain 2, 3:00
-	24 May	Papakura Camp (Army)	10	Ponsonby	9	H Tate	Victoria Park 1, 3:00
-	24 May	Point Chevalier	?	Newton	?	J Hawkes	Walker Park, Point Chevalier, 3:00
-	24 May	Mount Albert	?	Otahuhu	?	T Evans	Fowld's Park, Morningside, 3:00
-	24 May	Ellerslie	13	Richmond	11	J O’Shannessey	Ellerslie Reserve, 3:00
-	24 May	Northcote	6	North Shore	5	A Pearson	Stafford Park, Northcote, 3:00
Round 3	31 May	Mount Albert	3	Point Chevalier	0	?	?
-	31 May	Ellerslie	9	Manukau	0	?	?
Round 4	7 June	Mount Albert	WBD	Manukau	LBD	?	?
Round 5	14 June	Northcote	17	Manukau	2	?	?
-	14 June	Richmond	20	North Shore	8	?	?
-	14 June	Ellerslie	13	Mount Albert	0	?	?
Round 6	21 June	Otahuhu	29	Point Chevalier	5	?	?
-	21 June	Mount Albert	29	Papakura Camp (Army)	7	?	?
Round 7	28 June	Ellerslie	10	Northcote	0	?	?
-	28 June	Otahuhu	9	Richmond	5	?	?
-	28 June	North Shore	6	Ponsonby	3	?	?
Round 8	5 July	Otahuhu	21	Ponsonby	8	?	?
Round 9	12 July	Otahuhu	2	Ellerslie	0	?	?
Round 10	19 July	North Shore	19	Papakura Camp (Army)	0	?	?
-	19 July	Ellerslie	15	Ponsonby	5	?	?
Round 11	26 July	Ellerslie	7	North Shore	6	?	?
Round 12	2 August	Ellerslie	19	Point Chevalier	8	?	?
-	2 August	Otahuhu	23	Papakura Camp (Army)	6	?	?
Round 13	9 August	Richmond	5	Ellerslie	2	?	?
Round 14	16 August	Otahuhu	10	Ellerslie	0	?	?
-	16 August	Ponsonby	2	Richmond	2	?	?
Round 15	23 August	North Shore	12	Point Chevalier	3	?	?
-	23 August	Otahuhu	3	Ponsonby	2	?	?

== Other club matches and lower grades ==
=== Lower grade clubs ===
Otahuhu Rovers won the 3rd grade for the 3rd consecutive time. City Rovers won the 4th grade for the 4th consecutive year. They also beat Richmond Rovers 7–6 in the 4th grade knockout final. Point Chevalier won the 5th grade for the first time in their history. Ellerslie beat Richmond in the 5th grade knockout final by default. Richmond were unbeaten in winning the 6th grade while Ellerslie won the 7th grade. In the senior Schoolboys knockout final Point Chevalier beat R.V. 3–0.

R. Martin of the Otahuhu 3rd grade side won the J.F.W. Dickson medal for the most sportsmanlike player.

==== 3rd Grade ====
The 3rd Grade was won by Otahuhu who went unbeaten through the championship. In the knockout competition they beat Glenora before losing to Point Chevalier 15-8 on September 6 in the knockout final.

Team	Pld	W	D	L	F	A	Pts
Otahuhu Rovers	8	8	0	0	197	30	16
City Rovers	7	6	0	1	159	69	12
Glenora	9	6	0	3	105	92	12
Point Chevalier	3	2	0	1	38	30	4
Papakura	7	2	0	5	57	104	4
Ponsonby United	6	1	1	4	42	67	3
Green Lane	7	1	1	5	50	139	3
Richmond Rovers	7	1	0	6	38	155	2

==== 4th Grade (Gillett Cup) ====
The 4th Grade was won by City Rovers. They also won the knockout competition when they beat Richmond 7-6 in the final on September 20. The newspapers did not publish any fixtures and only reported some results so the following table is only compiled from the handful of known scores.

Team	Pld	W	D	L	F	A	Pts
City Rovers	5	5	0	0	129	19	10
Otahuhu Rovers	9	5	0	4	91	58	10
Avondale	4	2	1	1	29	19	5
Richmond Rovers	3	2	0	1	34	14	4
Point Chevalier	5	2	0	3	8	98	4
Northcote & Birkenhead Ramblers	2	1	0	1	28	29	2
Mount Albert United	2	1	0	1	7	8	2
North Shore Albions	1	0	0	1	3	5	0
Ellerslie United	3	0	0	3	11	30	0
Ponsonby United	3	0	0	3	7	38	0

==== 5th Grade ====
The 5th Grade championship was won by Point Chevalier A (they fielded two sides) in mid August. The knockout final was won by Ellerslie in a default win over Richmond on September 6. There were very few results reported so the following table has only been compiled from the known scores.

Team	Pld	W	D	L	F	A	Pts
Point Chevalier A	7	5	2	0	64	17	12
Ellerslie United	8	3	2	3	39	62	8
Papakura	5	1	0	4	27	33	2
Point Chevalier B	3	1	0	2	18	20	2
Richmond Rovers	1	0	0	1	0	16	0

==== 6th Grade ====
The 6th Grade championship was won by Richmond Rovers who went undefeated through the season. There were very few results reported so the following table has only been compiled from the known scores.

Team	Pld	W	D	L	F	A	Pts
Richmond Rovers	10	9	1	0	154	30	19
Newton Rangers	10	6	1	3	172	31	13
Otahuhu United	6	1	0	5	14	55	2
Ponsonby United	1	0	0	1	3	5	0
North Shore Albions	3	0	0	3	0	70	0
Northcote & Birkenhead Ramblers	5	0	0	5	0	134	0

==== 7th Grade ====
Ellerslie won the 7th grade championship following a 2-2 draw with Richmond on July 26. They also won the knockout competition when they beat Richmond 7-6 on August 30. There were very few results reported so the following table has only been compiled from the known scores and also likely includes some of the knockout competition scores which likely happened from August 2 to August 30.

Team	Pld	W	D	L	F	A	Pts
Ellerslie United	12	7	2	3	65	54	16
Richmond Rovers	9	4	1	4	121	37	9
Green Lane	9	4	0	5	39	34	8
Ponsonby United	1	0	0	1	3	5	0

==== Schoolboys ====
===== Seniors (Lou Rout Trophy) =====
There were very few results reported so the following table has only been compiled from the known scores. The championship winner is unknown. Point Chevalier won the knockout final when they beat R.V. 3 points to 0 on October 25.

Team	Pld	W	D	L	F	A	Pts
Point Chevalier Schools	10	8	0	2	62	27	16
Newton Rangers Schools	5	4	1	0	38	11	9
Mt Albert Schools	4	2	1	1	22	3	5
R.V. Schools	2	1	0	1	17	20	2
Northcote & Birkenhead Ramblers Schools	3	1	0	2	5	11	2
Avondale Schools	7	1	0	6	10	58	2
Ellerslie Schools	3	0	0	3	5	23	0
Ponsonby Schools	1	0	0	1	2	8	0
Newmarket Schools	1	0	0	1	0	0	0

===== Intermediate (Newport and Eccles Memorial Shield) =====
There were very few results reported so the following table has only been compiled from the known scores. The championship winner is unknown.

Team	Pld	W	D	L	F	A	Pts
Mt Albert Schools	7	5	1	1	48	11	11
Newton Rangers Schools	5	5	0	0	78	2	10
Point Chevalier Schools	7	3	2	2	68	28	8
Avondale Schools	6	3	1	2	58	50	7
R.V. Schools	6	3	0	2	104	13	6
Green Lane Schools	5	1	1	3	28	32	3
Papakura Schools	11	1	0	0	11	5	2
Newmarket Schools	2	0	1	1	3	22	1
Ponsonby Schools	3	0	0	3	0	34	0
Richmond Schools	4	0	0	4	6	73	0
Ellerslie Schools	4	0	0	4	3	137	0

In late August the Auckland Intermediate schoolboys team was selected to play South Auckland schoolboys in Huntly. The side was Carpenter (Newton), Dunn (Avondale), Prentice (Mt Albert), Tawhau (R.V.), Chin (R.V.), Fawley (Richmond), Nottingham (Mt Albert), Norris (Pt Chevalier), Townsend (R.V.), Lees (Newton), Dunn (Avondale), Foster (Richmond), Ellis (R.V.), reserves, McIlrot (Pt Chevalier), Thomas (Mt Albert), Bryant (Green Lane), Lucas (Pt Chevalier), and Bennett (Newton). The team was to meet and practice with Jack Silva, and E. Moore their managers. The South Auckland schoolboys side won the match in wet conditions by 17 points to 3.

===== Juniors =====
There were very few results reported so the following table has only been compiled from the known scores. The championship winner is unknown.

Team	Pld	W	D	L	F	A	Pts
Point Chevalier Schools	5	4	1	0	49	3	9
Green Lane Schools	4	4	1	0	51	6	9
North Shore Schools	5	2	1	2	57	12	5
Mt Albert Schools	3	2	0	1	42	16	4
Newmarket Schools	3	0	3	0	3	3	3
Marist Old Boys Schools A	3	1	1	1	8	27	3
Manukau Schools	1	1	0	0	3	0	2
Marist Old Boys Schools B	3	1	0	2	6	66	2
Richmond Schools	1	0	1	0	0	0	1
Glenora Schools	2	0	1	1	6	15	1
Northcote & Birkenhead Schools	2	0	1	1	0	6	0
Ponsonby Schools	5	0	0	5	0	32	0
R.V. Schools	4	0	0	4	0	39	0

In October a representative Auckland Schoolboys side was selected to play for the Golden Bloom Banner in a match against South Auckland Schoolboys. The team featured future New Zealand international Des White who would make his senior debut in 1947 and represent New Zealand for the first time in the same season. They won the game in Huntly 17 to 3. The team was: (BACKS) J. Takiru (R.V.), M. Daly (Avondale), J. Mackie (Mount Albert), L. Jury (Point Chevalier), J. Stackpole (Newton), Des White (Ponsonby), C. Moyle (Newton), C. Laurent (Mount Albert), (FORWARDS) W. Forman (Point Chevalier), P. Martin (R.V.), C. Aulderton (Newton), D. Rodgers (Mount Albert), C. Poole (Point Chevalier), J. Allen (Avondale), and H. Moore (Northcote). They played a return match at Carlaw Park a week later with Auckland winning 17–0.

On November 8 a Schoolboy Gala Day was held at Carlaw Park. Events included 50 yard races, relay races, Tug O War, and a seven-a-side tournament with Mount Albert beating Green Lane.

=== Other matches ===
==== Auckland Referees v South Auckland Referees ====
The match was for the Walmesley Shield

22 June	Auckland Referees	8-0	South Auckland Referees
3:00	Try: J Cawdron 2 Pen: Pat Meehan

==== Papakura v City ====
12 July	Papakura	9-15	City	Prince Edward Park, Papakura
3:00	Try: Keates, Hancock, Burgoyne		Try: James Brassey 3, Jim Gould, Stevens

==== Taranaki v Newton ====
Roy Niwa came on as a replacement for the injured Austin and scored a try. He shortly afterwards transferred to Auckland and joined the Newton club where he spent several seasons.

2 August	Taranaki	32-19 (14-8)	Newton	Stratford, Taranaki
3:00	Try: Keenan 2, Yeates 2, Hickland, Roy Niwa; Con: Cronin 2, R O'Shannessy 3 Pen: Cronin; Drop: Cronin		Try: McKinnon 2, James Silva, Frank Zimmerman 2 Con: Edgar Tredea 2	Referee: G Carter

==== Miramar (Wellington) v Richmond ====
Richmond was granted permission to travel to Wellington to play Miramar during the week by the Auckland Rugby League. The officials traveling with the side were J. McGregor, W. Rodwell, and W.R. Dick. Before a crowd of 3,000 with steady rain falling and the field muddy at the Basin Reserve the local Miramar side, who were the Wellington club champions, upset Richmond 12–8. The Miramar team was strengthened by the inclusion of players from other clubs and included Verdun Scott of the North Shore club who was training at the Trentham Camp. At fullback was A McLachlan the Mount Albert fullback from 1937 to 1940 who was also at Trentham. His tackling was said to have been "deadly". Frank Fitzgerald, the former Wairarapa rugby representative five eighth kicked a conversion, penalty and near the end dropped a goal. For Richmond Maurice Potter and Alf Broadhead scored tries after good passing movements. Richmond was said to have shown better rugby league ability but struggled in the conditions and against a strong effort from their opponents. Richmond five eighth Dave Solomon was criticised for being flat footed and caught in possession regularly and not sending his supports away though otherwise gave "a fine performance". Charles Webb, Wally Tittleton, and Lyndsay Jack combined well and in the Richmond forwards A McIntosh, George Mitchell and Maurice Potter stood out.

14 September	Miramar	12-8 (5-0)	Richmond	Basin Reserve, Wellington
2:45	Try: B Woods, R Cleland; Con: Frank Fitzgerald; Pen: Frank Fitzgerald; Drop: Frank Fitzgerald		Try: Maurice Potter, Alf Broadhead; Con: C Williams	Attendance: 3,000; Referee: W Simpson

== Representative fixtures ==
In August the West Coast board requested Auckland send a touring side there to play a match and possibly others in the South Island. However Auckland declined as “owing to war conditions and the fact of many prominent players being unable to obtain leave”. Chairman Campbell said “tentative arrangements had already been made, but it was found that at least six players hold important positions in various war industries, and unless the best combination was available, the trip was not advisable”.

=== Auckland Māori v South Auckland (Waikato) ===
The first representative match of the season was played on the Kings Birthday holiday. A curtain raiser was played between the Papakura Camp army side against Ellerslie's senior B team. The Māori side did not have a regular halfback in their side so instead used Tommy Chase in the position. He had played there once or twice before in his long rugby union and rugby league career and had played every single position in the backline over that time.

2 June	Auckland Māori	12-23	South Auckland	Carlaw Park 1
3:00	Try: Tom Butler, Pita Ririnui; Con: Jack Hemi; Pen: Jack Hemi 2		Try: J Connolly 2, J Brook; Con: G Moyes 2 Pen: G Moyes 3, G Stevens 2	Referee: George Kelly

=== Auckland v South Auckland (Waikato) ===
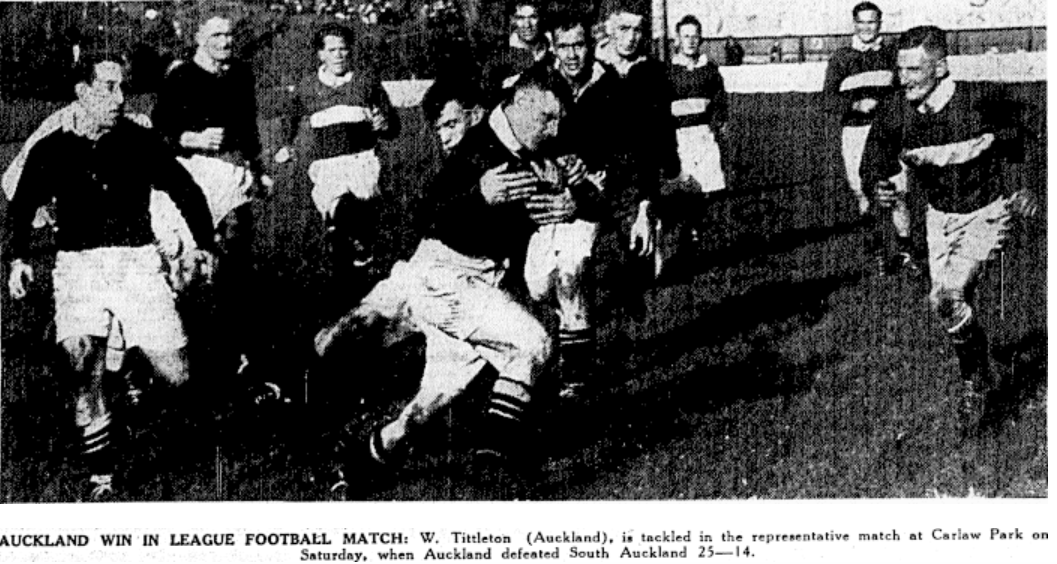
Wally Tittleton with the ball attacking for Auckland

Originally Brian Riley and Pita Ririnui were named to play in the Auckland side but were dropped after being unable to train. Chairman G. Grey Campbell said “chosen players must practise”. Ririnui had said he was unable to attend the two trainings while Riley had injured an ankle on the previous Saturday. Acting Prime Minister, the Honorable Walter Nash, and Honorable Patrick Charles Webb (Minister of Labour) were among the spectators which numbered between 9 and 10 thousand. Auckland trialled 14–6 before a big comeback saw them win 25–14. In a curtain-raiser the South Auckland Schoolboys beat Auckland Schoolboys 9–8.

12 July	Auckland	25-14	South Auckland	Carlaw Park 1
3:00	Try: Tom Butler 3, George Mitchell, Hawea Mataira; Con: Jack Smith 3 Pen: Jack Smith 2		Try: G Moyes 2 Con: G Moyes 2 Pen: G Moyes, J McGaughran	Attendance: 9500; Referee: Owen Chalmers

=== South Auckland Old Boys v All Golds ===
On Sunday, August 10 an All Golds team of veteran representative players traveled to Davies Park in Huntly to take on a South Auckland veteran side. A special train was put on with 400 traveling from Auckland. The cause was to raise money for "local patriotic funds" and the days events were organised by the Huntly Patriotic Committee. Nine Auckland bands also made the trip with 3,000 spectators in attendance and £200 was raised. The All Golds team included Craddock Dufty, Roy Hardgrave, Allan Seagar, Clarry McNeil, Stan Prentice, Charles Dunne, Roy Powell, Stan Clark, Jack Satherley, Des Herring, Jack McLeod, William McLaughlin, Trevor Hanlon, with the reserves: Norm Campbell, Tim Peckham, Len Schultz, J Purdy, Gordon Campbell, and Huck Flanagan.

10 August	South Auckland Old Boys	15-10	All Golds	Davies Park, Huntly
3:00				Attendance: 3,000

=== South Auckland (Waikato) v Auckland ===
Jim Clark and E Chapman were appointed managers for the Auckland team on their trip south to Davies Park in Huntly. Auckland were welcomed to the ground by the mayor of Huntly, Mr. George Smith with a large attendance present. There was no rain during the match but it was in heavy condition with large pools of water in places. Auckland Schoolboys traveled with them and were defeated by South Auckland Schoolboys by 17 points to 3.

6 September	South Auckland	15-26	Auckland	Davies Park, Huntly
3:00	Try: R.C. Deverill 2, G Stevens; Con: T Shaw; Pen: T Shaw, P Minhinnick		Try: Jim Gould 2, W Smith, Hawea Mataira, Jack Tristram; Con: Warwick Clarke 3 Pen: Warwick Clarke	Referee: S Farrar

=== Auckland Māori v Auckland Pākehā ===
Auckland Māori won the match with a last minute try to Ivan Gregory after they had trailed 16–17.

20 September	Auckland Māori	21-17	Auckland Pākehā	Carlaw Park 1
3:00	Try: Ivan Gregory 3, Tom Butler, George Mitchell; Con: Jack Hemi 3		Try: Brian Riley 3, W Jackson, Clarrie Peterson; Con: Bob Scott	Attendance: 6,000; Referee: Jack Hawkes

=== Senior B Trial match Senior Clubs v Junior Clubs ===
On September 13 a trial match was played between the Senior Clubs and Junior Clubs from the senior B grade. The Senior clubs were made up of Manukau, Ponsonby, Mount Albert, Richmond and North Shore, while the Junior Clubs were made up of Point Chevalier, Otahuhu, Ellerslie, and Northcote.

13 September	Junior Clubs	25-5	Senior Clubs	Ellerslie Domain
3:00	Try: R.C. Milligan 2, N Johnston, W.S. McKenzie, A Dormer, A Taylor, T Johnson; Con: C Allan, R. C. Milligan		Try: Takeri; Con: Unknown x 1

=== NZ OB's v S. Auckland OB's (Les Lees Challenge Cup) ===
On September 27 a match was played between the recently formed New Zealand Old Boys Association and the South Auckland Old Boys. The New Zealand side was essentially made up of Auckland players. The Minister of Labour, Paddy Webb kicked off the match. The afternoon also including marching bands and a tribute to soldiers who served in the first World War, along with a wrestling match between M. Donovan, and A. Edwards.

27 September	New Zealand Old Boys Association	8-11	South Auckland Old Boys	Western Springs
3:00	Try: Roy Hardgrave, Trevor Hanlon; Con: Craddock Dufty		Try: G Knight, W Miki, J White; Con: C Siddles	Referee: A.E. Smith

=== Auckland Representative Matches Played and Scorers ===
No	Name	Club Team	Play	Tries	Con	Pen	Points
1	Jack Smith	North Shore	1	0	3	2	10
2	Tom Butler	Manukau	1	3	0	0	9
3	Warwick Clarke	City	1	0	3	1	8
4	Hawea Mataira	City	2	2	0	0	6
4	Jim Gould	City	1	2	0	0	6
6	George Mitchell	Richmond	1	1	0	0	3
6	W Smith	Marist	1	1	0	0	3
6	James (Jack) Tristram	Mount Albert	1	1	0	0	3
9	Leo Davis	Richmond	2	0	0	0	0
9	Arthur Kay	Ponsonby	2	0	0	0	0
9	Bert Leatherbarrow	Mount Albert	2	0	0	0	0
9	Wally Tittleton	Richmond	2	0	0	0	0
9	Vic Barchard	Marist	1	0	0	0	0
9	Robert Grotte	City	1	0	0	0	0
9	Jack Hemi	Manukau	1	0	0	0	0
9	Wirepa Jackson	City	1	0	0	0	0
9	J McArthur	North Shore	1	0	0	0	0
9	Clarrie Peterson	North Shore	1	0	0	0	0
9	Richard Shadbolt	Mount Albert	1	0	0	0	0
9	Dave Solomon	Richmond	1	0	0	0	0
9	C.W. Williams	Richmond	1	0	0	0	0

=== Auckland Māori Representative Matches Played and Scorers ===
No	Name	Club Team	Play	Tries	Con	Pen	Points
1	Jack Hemi	Manukau	2	0	4	2	12
2	Ivan Gregory	Manukau	1	3	0	0	9
3	W Butler	Manukau	2	2	0	0	6
4	George Mitchell	Richmond	1	1	0	0	3
4	Pita Ririnui	Manukau	1	1	0	0	3
6	Tommy Chase	Manukau	2	0	0	0	0
6	Ralph Martin	Manukau	2	0	0	0	0
6	W Mataira	City	2	0	0	0	0
6	Joe Murray	Manukau	2	0	0	0	0
6	A Te Tai	Manukau	2	0	0	0	0
6	Briggs	Ponsonby	1	0	0	0	0
6	J Hilton	Richmond	1	0	0	0	0
6	W Martin	Manukau	1	0	0	0	0
6	Jack Tristram	Mount Albert	1	0	0	0	0
6	H Kendall	Newton	1	0	0	0	0
6	Hawea Mataira	City	1	0	0	0	0
6	Dave Solomon	Richmond	1	0	0	0	0
6	T Tawhai	Manukau	1	0	0	0	0
6	Steve Watene	Manukau	1	0	0	0	0

=== Auckland Pākehā Representative Matches Played and Scorers ===
No	Name	Club Team	Play	Tries	Con	Pen	Points
1	Brian Riley	Ponsonby	1	3	0	0	9
2	W Jackson	City	1	1	0	0	3
3	Bob Scott	Ponsonby	1	0	1	0	2
4	Alf Broadhead	Richmond	1	0	0	0	0
4	Eric Chatham	Richmond	1	0	0	0	0
4	Roy Clarke	North Shore	1	0	0	0	0
4	C Williams	Richmond	1	0	0	0	0
4	Leo Davis	Richmond	1	0	0	0	0
4	McIntosh	Mount Albert	1	0	0	0	0
4	Jim Gould	City	1	0	0	0	0
4	Abbie Graham	Richmond	1	0	0	0	0
4	Wally Tittleton	Richmond	1	0	0	0	0
4	Clarrie Peterson	North Shore	1	0	0	0	0

== Annual General Meetings and Club News ==
=== Auckland Rugby League Junior Control Board ===
They held their annual meeting on March 25 at the League Rooms on Courthouse Lane. At the annual meeting of the Junior Control Board on April 8 the following board was elected:- Messrs. E. Chapman (chairman), C. Howe (vice-chairman), W. Clarke (secretary), I. Stonex (assistant secretary and grounds allocator), G. Batchelor, W. Burgess, T. Carey, M. McNamara, E. Kane, E. Renner. Nominations for all grades would close on April 22 with May 3 set as a possible season start date.

=== ARL Schoolboy Management Committee ===
In May it was reported that 39 teams had been nominated in the schoolboys competition.

=== Auckland Rugby League Referees Association ===
They held their annual meeting on March 10 at the ARL Board Rooms in Greys Buildings. They elected the following officers”- President, Mr, Les Bull; vice-president, Mr. G. McGowatt; delegate to the ARL, Mr. William Mincham; delegate to the junior control board, Mr. J. Short; delegate to the senior management committee, Mr. J. Kelly; delegate to the New Zealand Referees’ Association, Mr. Les Bull; secretary, Mr. Thomas E. Skinner; treasurer, Mr. A. E. Chapman; auditor, Mr. Percy Rogers; official critic, Mr. S. Billman; examination committee Messrs. Renton and Brady; appointment board, Mr. Percy Rogers; executive, Messrs. Maurice Wetherill, R. Otto, and Hawkes. At their meeting on June 3 they farewelled Sergeant N. D. McIvor who was going to war. With 50 members present best wishes and a safe return were wished and Mr. G. McCowatt presented him with an inscribed notecase.

=== Avondale Rugby League Football Club ===
Avondale held their annual meeting in St. Jude's Street Hall on Tuesday, April 1. Their honorary secretary was H. W. Green. They advertised for a general practice in the newspaper to be held at the Avondale Racecourse on Saturday, April 5 with all players to report to club captain, Mr. E. Buck at 2pm. Then on April 18 they advertised for players in all grades from schoolboys to senior B.

=== City Rovers Football Club ===
City Rovers held their annual meeting at the League Rooms in the Grey Buildings on Courthouse Lane on Thursday, the 20th of March. Ernie Asher was their secretary for the season. At the control board meeting on April 23 Mr. J. Rutledge said that the City club would have Roy Hardgrave as their player coach.

=== Ellerslie United League Football Club ===
On March 12 Ellerslie United held their annual meeting at the Parish Hall in Ellerslie. They held a training for “all grades” on the Ellerslie Reserve on Friday, April 11 at 2 pm. Their honorary secretary for 1941 was Mr. G. Whaley. Ellerslie applied for life memberships in Auckland Rugby League in April on behalf of Messrs. G. Chapman, and J. McInnarney but this was deferred by the Auckland Rugby League and a subcommittee of chairman Campbell, Ivan Culpan, Ted Phelan, and W. O. Carlaw was appointed to offer suggestions governing the classification of life-members. In May “the Ellerslie branch of the Fighting Forces Patriotic fund appealed for a senior fixture to be arranged at Ellerslie on a date in the near future”. The request was deferred so that a suitable match could be arranged. The round 7 match on June 21 was played at the Ellerslie Domain and the Ellerslie patriotic committee wrote a letter expressing thanks in July.

=== Green Lane Football Club ===
Green Lane held their annual meeting at the Training Shed in Green Lane on Wednesday, March 26. At the June 25 ARL meeting a letter from the Green Lane club was read asking about trophies which would be allotted for the season. Several suggestions were made but the matter was deferred until later in the season.

=== Manukau Rugby League Football Club ===
They held their annual meeting on March 11 in the Labour Party Rooms, in the Strand Theatre Buildings on Queen Street in Onehunga. They began their preseason training at the Training Shed on Galway Street on Saturday, March 29. On July 15 at the ARL meeting Manukau requested that their match with Marist scheduled for August 2 be played at Waikaraka Park in Onehunga for the benefit of the Onehunga Patriotic Fund. The board decided to defer the decision for a week. News came on July 24 from Mihaka Panapa, the former Manukau player who was serving in the war. He said “the restaurants were our camping grounds, and really we did make gluttons of ourselves”. “It was eat, eat all the time, and still more eating” as they were on leave from Crete for seven days in Egypt. Panapa was killed on December 16 in the same year in the Western Desert, North Africa and was buried at Knightsbridge War Cemetery, Acroma, Libya.

=== Marist Brothers Old Boys League Football Club ===
On March 6 The Marist club in conjunction with the Parnell branch of the Returned Soldier's Association held a gathering at the Parnell Returned Soldiers Hall to farewell J. Matthews who had played three quarter for the senior side for several seasons. He was a member of the expeditionary force. They presented him with a razor case. They held their annual meeting in the rugby league rooms on Courthouse Lane on March 13.

=== Mount Albert League Football Club ===
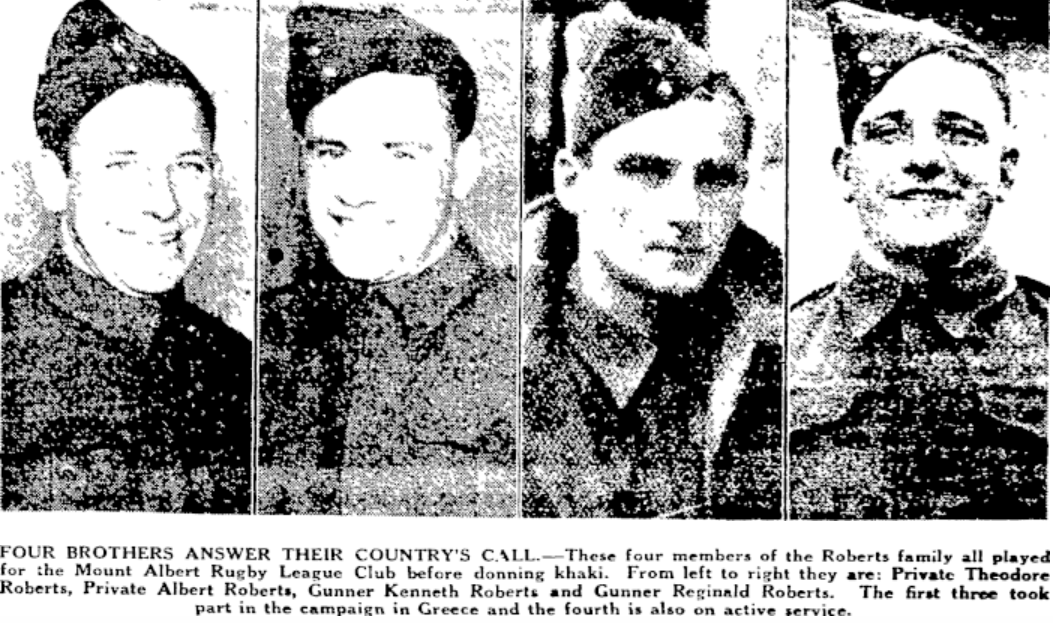
The Roberts family who had all played for Mount Albert and were now serving in World War 2.

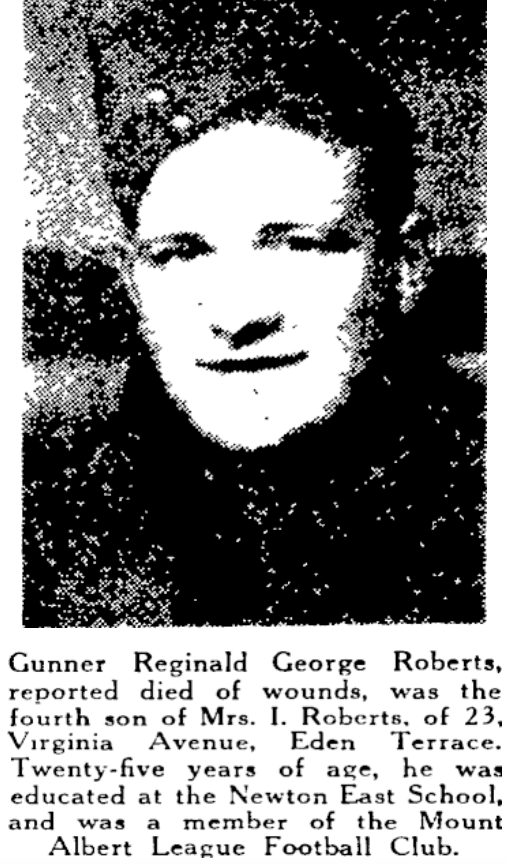

Their annual meeting was held at King George's Hall at the Mount Albert Terminus on March 17. They held their first official training for all grades at Fowlds Park, Morningside on Saturday, April 5. Their honorary secretary was H. G. Shaw. On June 28 it was reported that 4 brothers, who had all represented Mount Albert were serving in the war. They were Private Theodore Roberts, Private Albert Roberts, Gunner Kenneth Roberts, and Gunner Reginald Roberts. Reginald was killed in action on July 5, 1942, in North Africa.

=== Newmarket Rugby League Football Club ===
They held their annual meeting in the Municipal Buildings in Newmarket on Wednesday, April 9. Their honorary secretary was Mr. B. R. Arnott.

=== Newton Rangers League Football Club ===
Newton held their annual meeting on March 17 in the League Rooms. They began their preseason training for seniors and juniors on Tuesday, April 1 at Carlaw Park at 7pm. Their honorary secretary was Mr. J. A. MacKinnon. At the July 9 meeting of the ARL Newton were granted permission to travel to Taranaki on August 2 to play an exhibition match at Stratford. Mr. J. A. McKinnon was appointed manager for the trip.

=== North Shore Albions League Football Club ===
North Shore Albions held their annual meeting in Buffaloes’ Hall on Wednesday, March 26. They advertised for their first training on Wednesday, April 9 at 7:30 pm at the Football Shed with juniors and schoolboys practising the following Saturday on the Football Ground at 2pm. Their secretary for the season was Mr. Merven William Coghlan.

=== Otahuhu Rugby League Football Club ===
On March 11 Otahuhu held their annual meeting at the League Rooms on Hutton Street, Otahuhu.

=== Papakura Rugby League Football Club ===
Held their annual meeting in early March. Their president Mr. L. McVeagh explained that it was very difficult to secure senior players for the coming season as “no fewer than thirty members were now serving overseas and a dozen were waiting to be called up”. McVeagh said “in the senior team only five could be accounted for, the rest were serving overseas. All the third grade had now joined up and no fewer than 35 members were in army service”. The possibility of “grouping clubs” was discussed. Mr. J. Miller passed a motion that a special meeting be called with a “suggestion that a senior team be formed from the Papakura, Otahuhu and Ellerslie clubs”. While another speaker stated that “other amalgamation proposal were: City and Newton, and Ponsonby and Mt. Albert, and that Papakura would have to be prepared to do likewise”. The financial statement showed that £150 had been spent on transport, though £300 had been received in donations and they finished the year with £115 as a credit balance. The following officers were elected:- President, Mr. L. McVeagh; 20 vice-presidents, treasurer, Mr. B. Turner; committee Messrs. A. Hill, W. Tyson, F. Osborne, W. Leighton, E.J. Clarke, R. Bates, A. Burgess, F. Smith, and F. Wells.

At a meeting of the Papakura Council on March 24 permission for the use of Prince Edward Park was granted for the league club at a rental of £10, plus the cost of lighting. The mayor said that the lighting might be used for training in the future if it were sufficiently shrouded which would have been due to the war and the effort to not use lighting unnecessarily at night. It was reported on May 1 that the Papakura club had taken exception to the grazing of sheep on Prince Edward Park on their playing area. The Papakura Borough Council decided to cut the grass on the playing area but refused to withdraw the sheep from the park. The club was also advised that the Auckland Rugby League strictly prohibited lighting for practice at the park in May. In June it was reported that A. Verner had been wounded in the war. He had been a playing member of the Papakura club and his father Fred served on the committee. At the July 9 meeting of the ARL they requested permission for a senior match to be played at Prince Edward Park later in the season. The league decided to defer their decision until the next meeting. They again requested a match on July 15 for later in the season but the decision was deferred further. On July 19 a lengthy article was written in the Auckland Star about the poor showing from the Papakura senior team which had struggled in the past 2 seasons.

=== Pt Chevalier Rugby League Football Club ===
Pt. Chevalier advertised a practice for all grades to be held on Saturday, April 19 at 2pm on Walker Park in Point Chevalier. The schoolboys were to practice at 10:30 a.m.

=== Ponsonby United Football Club ===
Held their annual meeting on February 24 in their club rooms on Jervois Road, Ponsonby. They began their pre-season training on Saturday, March 22 at Carlaw Park. Their honorary secretary for 1941 was Mr. W. J. Grieve. Their senior coach for the season was Dougie McGregor.

=== Richmond Rovers Football Club ===
Richmond Rovers held their annual meeting on March 5 at their clubrooms in Grey Lynn Park. Their first preseason training session was at Grey Lynn Park on Saturday, April 5. Junior players were expected to report to Mr. J. Wilson, Club Captain at 2pm and senior players at 3pm. In September Richmond were granted permission to travel to Wellington to play a match against Miramar who were the Wellington champions at the Basin Reserve. Messrs. J. McGregor, W. Rodwell, and W. R. Dick were approved at officials to go with the team.

== Transfers and registrations ==
Robert Grotte had his transfer cleared from Marist to City in late April.

On May 21 the following transfers were approved: R Oliver from Newton to Manukau, R Cheater from North Shore to Newton, J.S. Boyd and W.L. Dormer from Ponsonby to Point Chevalier.

On June 4 M. Soloman was reinstated. C Brimble was granted a transfer from the Central club in Wellington to Newton, while L. Shaw was transferred from North Shore to Manukau. On June 18 M. Barnard of Christchurch was transferred to Newton Rangers, and C. Webb from Stratford to City Rovers. On June 25 the transfers were approved of G. Moyes and C. Deverall from Manukau to Huntly, while R. Lumley was reinstated. On July 15 Roy Hardgrave had his transfer from Mount Albert to Newton approved, as did L. Rowntree who was moving from City to Newton. On July 23 Edwin Abbott was granted a transfer from Richmond to Ellerslie and regraded to senior B. He had represented New Zealand from 1930 to 1932 but had not played in Auckland for many seasons after originally playing in the Waikato. The following players were registered:- W. Major, M Thompson, J. Gregory (Manukau); W. N. C. Craig (Richmond), M. Smythe (Mount Albert); E. G. Wood (Marist); J. H. Corbett (City). Also G. O. Leahy transferred from the St. George club in Wellington to Northcote. On August 27 “the question of the membership with the Newton club of W. R. Brimble, who had already played this season with Manukau was discussed at length, and it was decided that as Brimble was not a registered member of the Manukau club, he must stand down for a period of 12 months, dating from his last game with Newton”.

On September 3 L. A. Naughton was officially registered with North Shore, and G. H. Hewson with Papakura.
