= 1943 Auckland Rugby League season =

The 1943 Auckland Rugby League season was its 35th. The season was affected once more by World War II with many men away at war. The Auckland Rugby League decided however that there were enough players at the respective senior clubs to have a 9 team competition with no need for any merged sides. This was made easier by the fact that there was no reserve grade competition.

Manukau had an historic season winning all 4 major trophies. They won the Fox Memorial Shield for the third time following its first title in 1936, and second the previous season in 1942. They finished with a 14 win, 2 loss record, and were 4 points ahead of City Rovers. Manukau also won the Rukutai Shield for winning the first round with a 7 win, 1 loss record. The Roope Rooster was won by with a 21–9 win over Ponsonby United, and then a week later they defeated City Rovers 12-9 for the Stormont Shield which was their 3rd consecutive win of this trophy. On October 16 Manukau played the West Coast champions, Blackball. They were regarded as one of the strongest club sides ever seen in the South Island and had easily defeated the Christchurch champions Sydenham, and the Wellington champions, Petone. Manukau trailed in the second half before a strong finish saw them run out 23–9 winners. The stars for the Manukau side during the season were Tom Butler, Jack Hemi, Jim Murray, George Shilton, Aubrey Thompson, and Puti Tipene Watene. The side was almost entirely composed of Māori players, many of whom had been recruited from around the North Island over the current and preceding seasons. North Shore Albions had a season to forget. Their combined side with Marist in the previous season had finished last in 1942 and in 1943 they came last once again with a 2 win, 1 draw, 12 loss record. They were then knocked out of the Roope Rooster competition in the first round and then lost in the first round of the Phelan Shield 32–0 to City Rovers.

The representative season was short once again due in part to the war. It opened with a match between Auckland Pākehā and Auckland Māori on September 4 which was drawn 13-13. The Māori side was dominated by Manukau players with 8 of the 13 from that club. Auckland played 2 matches against South Auckland who were the northern Waikato side of the time. They lost both matches with sides that could generally be described as under strength. In their first match they were made up of 5 of the 9 club sides with the other 4 playing in the Roope Rooster competition on the same day, then in the return match with South Auckland the champion Manukau side was away and so all of their players were unavailable.

Preceded by 1942	35th Auckland Rugby League season 1943	Succeeded by 1944

== Auckland Rugby League news ==
=== Preliminary Meetings ===
At a conference of all the senior clubs on the evening of March 3 it was agreed that the annual meeting would be held on March 31 with the playing season planned to open on April 10 with a preliminary round. Every club reported that they would be able to put a strong team on the field. Mr. J. Watson, chairman of the board presided over the evening. Mr. A. Chapman was appointed treasurer and Mr. J. Knowling was a member of the Armed Forces. Thomas E. Skinner was the honorary secretary. On March 26 another meeting was held with it confirmed that the season would open on April 10 (with preliminary matches). Chairman, Mr. J.W. Watson said “most senior clubs had discussed the senior grade competition, which would be played on the same lines as last season”. Mr. A Chapman who had recently been appointed treasurer resigned as he had been transferred out of Auckland.

=== Annual General Meeting ===
The report for the annual meeting was released prior to the meeting. It stated that one of the matches between the Māori and Pākehā teams in 1942 had seen a record gate for a local game at Carlaw Park. The report noted “that the numerical strength of juniors was not up to former years, although 35 teams competed in a full-time programme. The code appeared to be hit harder by the loss of younger players serving with the fighting forces”. The report also mentioned the “excellent work of the Ladies’ Social Committee. Visits were paid to injured players at home and in hospital. The ladies contributed just over £20 towards the comforts of injured players”. The number of school teams was 32 which “constituted a record”. A total of £3055 was taken at club games at Carlaw Park with £323 paid as grants to clubs on a percentage basis. The injured players’ fund cost £194 6/, £55 was also spent on entertainment during the season. The league also invested in War and Liberty bonds to the amount of £200. The total assets of the Auckland Rugby League stood at £10,743, with Carlaw Park valued at £7,314, and the grandstand at £2,585.

The annual meeting was held at the League Rooms, Greys Building, Courthouse Lane on Wednesday, March 31 at 7.45pm. At the meeting president Mr. G. Grey Campbell said “although there may have been some criticism that football has been carried on during the war, I believe it was a very wise policy to continue ... games like football, cricket, hockey, and tennis have been national in this country, and when the players were called upon to fight for their country they had the right moral attitude and courage to fit them for the higher job”, he went on to say “there is no doubt that sport has rendered a particularly fine service to our young men in more ways than one. Regarding those men who will play this season, we know that if an emergency arises they will be the first to go where the trouble is to be found”. Mr. Edward (Ted) John Phelan (a trustee), and chairman Watson congratulated Ivan Culpan who had been secretary of the league for 25 years. Mr. A. Leese, who was on the New Zealand Council said Culpan's “long years of service was a record, and he considered that most of the success of the league was due to his fine work”. Appreciation was also shown towards the treasurer Mr. James Edward Knowling who was now with the armed forces. He was presented with a cheque. The following officers were elected and committees appointed: Chairman, Mr. J.W. Watson; secretary, Mr. Ivan Culpan; treasurer (acting), Mr. R. Doble; club delegates, Messrs. T. Wilson, J. Clark, T. Davis, John William Probert, William Mincham, T. Wilson; insurance, Messrs. R. Doble, T. Davis, E. Chapman; delegate to New Zealand Rugby League, Mr. R. Doble.

=== Senior competition ===
Following the first round of preliminary first grade matches on April 10 there was general pleasure in the playing numbers of all eight teams who played. At the board meeting on April 14 chairman J.W. Watson indicated that “in spite of the proposed policy to limit the competition to six teams under the amalgamation scheme, there was now much to be said for the inclusion of nine teams. He added that the Senior Officers’ Association would consider the question at its next meeting”. Following the second round of preliminary games on April 17 it was decided that there was indeed enough strength for a 9 team competition with no need for any clubs to temporarily amalgamate. The 1942 season had seen the forced mergers of Marist Old Boys and North Shore Albions, City Rovers and Otahuhu Rovers, and Newton Rangers and Mount Albert United. The deputy chairman, Mr. Ted Phelan said “the trial games had been very successful, and the prospects for the season looked very bright”. At the meeting it was agreed however that the strength of the senior teams would be reviewed at the end of the first round to determine if the composition of the senior teams would need to change for the remainder of the season. At the June 9 meeting of the board with deputy chairman Mr. John Probert presiding the Senior Officers’ Association suggested that the second round can continue with all nine teams and the management committee agreed.

=== Player registration rules ===
At the May 12 board meeting the position of players registrations was discussed. The rule was that if a player did not play for a period of 12 months then they could register with any affiliated club as long as a financial clearance was obtained. And as such any player returning from service who had not played for 12 months should be able to register with any club and not be compelled to register with their previous club. It was decided to refer the issue to the senior clubs for a report.

=== Resignation of Ernie Asher from City Rovers ===
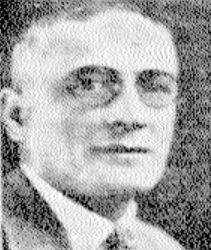
Ernie Asher

In mid May Ernie Asher announced his resignation from the position of secretary for the City Rovers club. It was a position that he had held for an amazing 32 years. Asher had represented New Zealand (6 matches), New Zealand Māori (17 matches), and Auckland (12 matches). He also played 72 games for City from 1910 to 1918 scoring 171 points. At the board meeting the same week chairman Watson said “Mr Asher had given the code outstanding service, both as a player and official”.

=== Liberty Loan Fund ===
The proceeds of the matches played at Carlaw Park on June 26 were invested in the Liberty Loan Funds to assist with the war effort. On June 19 Finance Minister, Walter Nash had spoken to the crowd about the fund and the ARL decided to contribute during the following week. Then at their board meeting on June 30 they decided to invest £200 more in addition to the £400 they had already invested. The Referees’ Association and the schoolboys executive had increased the donation by £10 each.

=== Auckland representative side ===
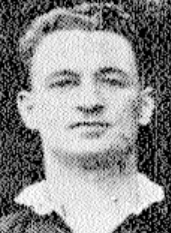
Jack Kirwan

At the April 23 board meeting Dougie McGregor, Bill Cloke, and Jack Kirwan were appointed the Auckland representative selectors for the season. The Wellington Rugby League requested a representative game in Wellington. Mr. Phelan thought that “every encouragement should be given to the playing of representative games, and it was decided to arrange a suitable date for the match. Ultimately there were no representative matches played with Wellington, though the City Rovers did visit on their bye weekend to play a Wellington Māori side at Newtown Park in Wellington.

=== Injured players fund ===
At the board meeting on May 12 the issue of assistance to the injured players fund was discussed. The senior officers’ association wrote a letter to the board asking that the ‘players day’ matches be played on the weekend between the championship final and the Roope Rooster competition. At the league meeting on June 2 the ladies’ social committee forwarded a donation of £5 toward the injured players fund. Chairman Watson remarked “that the ladies had done splendid service in this respect”.

=== Carlaw Park ===
Prior to the commencement of the season if was proposed that charges for soldiers in uniform would increase. Mr. T. Davis said that last season all men in uniform were admitted at half price. It was decided at the meeting that uniformed men, other than returned soldiers should pay the usual admission price. The price for admission for the season was set at 1 shilling for the ground, with ladies at 6 pence, and admission into the railway stand a further 6 pence. On May 5 several clubs appealed for the easing of restrictions on the use of the flood lights at Carlaw Park so they could train in the evenings. The matter was referred to the electric lighting controller. Chairman Watson said that the ground still came within the restricted area which banned lighting at night time due to the war and the threat of night time bombing. The St John Ambulance Brigade requested the provision of additional first aid rooms at Carlaw Park at the June 2 meeting of the league. The request was granted. In July all servicemen who were home on furlough who wore the New Zealand shoulder strap were admitted to games for free.

=== Shortage of jerseys ===
At the April 14 ARL meeting it was reported that clubs were having trouble securing football jerseys and other equipment. The Rationing Controller, Mr. J.E. Thomas said that “individual football clubs must make early application to the local rationing office, and arrangements would then be made to provide gear. The letter pointed out, however, that with the coupon issue, the requirements should be kept down as much as possible”. Chairman Watson also appealed to all clubs to follow the advice of the controller strictly.

=== Donation to Lance Todd Memorial ===

On May 5 it was decided that the league would donate 3 guineas to the proposed Lance B. Todd memorial which the English Rugby League were sponsoring. Todd had been killed in a car accident in England in late 1942 on his way home from duty in Oldham. Todd had played rugby in Auckland before switching codes and joining the New Zealand team for the 1907–1908 tour of Great Britain and Australia. He later settled in England and played for Wigan and Dewsbury. After his playing retirement Todd coached Salford to several championship titles and then in 1933 became the commentator for BBC Radio. The man of the match in the Challenge Cup final is still presented with the Lance Todd Trophy.

== Obituaries ==
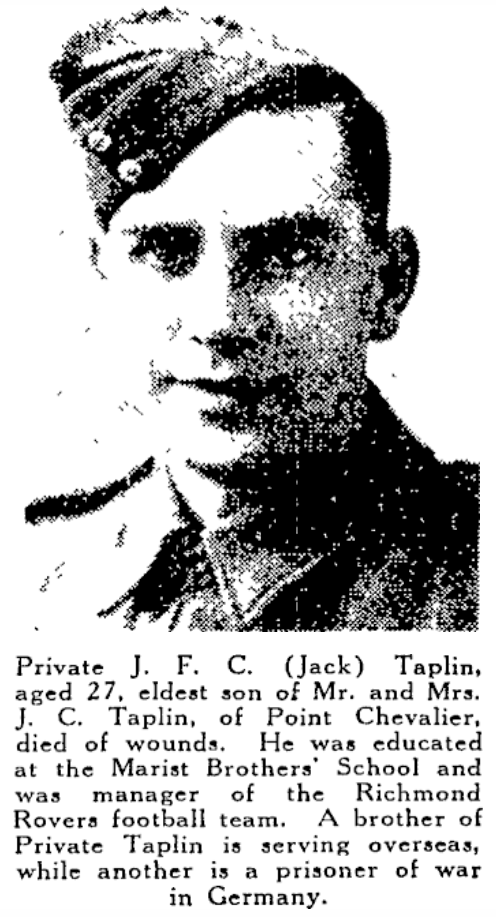

A number of Auckland rugby league players were killed during 1943. Jack Frederick Crang Taplin and Lyndsay Dennis Evans were two who were involved with senior grade sides.

=== John (Jack) Frederick Crang Taplin ===
John (Jack) Frederick Crang Taplin was killed in action on July 22, 1942, aged just 27. He was educated at Marist Brothers’ School and was the manager of the Richmond Rovers side prior to going to war. His father was John Taplin, and mother Mildred Taplin. John (Jack) was living in Onehunga at the time of his enlistment. He was killed in the Western Desert campaign, North Africa and buried at El Alamein War Cemetery, Egypt. Taplin's two brothers, Edgar, and Albert were also serving in the war at the time. Jack is memorialised at the Onehunga War Memorial Swimming Pool, and at the Auckland War Memorial Museum, World War 2 Hall of Memories.

=== Lyndsay Dennis Evans ===
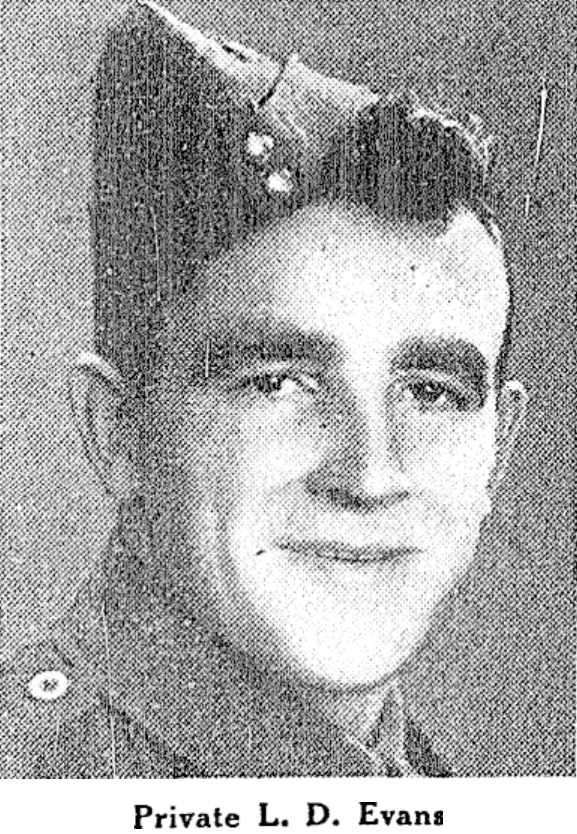

Lyndsay Dennis Evans was killed in action on April 20, 1943, after previously having been reported missing. Nicknamed ‘Bun’ he was the youngest son of Mrs. Catherine Evans and the late Mr. Alfred Evans, of 51 Wallace Road, Papakura. He had been educated at Papakura School and Pukekohe High School. Evans represented the South Auckland Primary School's representative side in the Northern Roller Mills Shield Competition in 1931. After leaving high school he worked as an attendant at the Kingseat Mental Hospital. He played rugby league for the Papakura club and in 1938 scored 6 tries so the senior side. He had left New Zealand in December 1942 with the Second New Zealand Expeditionary Force and was a Private in the 21 Infantry Battalion. Evans was killed in action after being shot in the chest and stomach by German artillery at Takrouna, Tunisia aged 25. He was buried at Enfidaville War Cemetery, Tunisia. He is memorialised at the Karaka War Memorial, on Great South Road, Papakura and in the Auckland War Memorial Museum, World War 2 Hall of Memories.

=== Ernest Charles Bailey ===
Former North Shore Albions player, Ernest (Ernie) Charles Bailey was killed in an accident at the shipyards of Charles Bailey and Son, Limited on December 8. Bailey had been a well known boat builder his entire life. He played originally for North Shore rugby club in the 1900s but joined the fledgling league code around 1911 when in his mid 20s. He played at hooker for North Shore Albions throughout the 1910s playing 70 games for their senior side, scoring 8 tries and kicking 2 goals. He played an exhibition game for Auckland B in 1913 against his own North Shore Albions side and later represented the full Auckland side three times. The first came in 1918 when he played against Canterbury following a move to the Grafton Athletic club when the North Shore senior side had folded early in the season due to losing players to the war effort. He scored his only representative points when he kicked a conversion. His second and third appearances came in 1919 when he was back with the North Shore side. They were against the New Zealand side on May 24, which was preparing to depart for their tour of Australia. He played the New Zealand side again on their return from Australia on August 23. Bailey was aged 60 at the time of his death and was survived by a wife and three sons. A fourth son had been killed while serving with the Royal New Zealand Navy.

== Fox Memorial Shield (senior grade championship) ==
=== Preliminary rounds ===
As in previous seasons there were two preliminary rounds of games played to ascertain the strength of the various clubs at the senior level before the size of the Fox Memorial competition would be determined. With there being no reserve grade or senior B competition the numbers for the main grade were surprisingly high with “no shortage of players” and it was decided to allow all 9 clubs to compete without mergers as there had been the previous season. Otahuhu Rovers surprised Richmond Rovers with a 13–7 win.

==== Round 1 ====
10 April	City	14-9	Mt Albert	Carlaw Park 1
1:45	Try: Alan Donovan, Te Wiri; Con: Alan Donovan 2 Pen: Alan Donovan		Try: Basil Cranch, Les Clement, Herbert Zane-Zaninovich	Referee: Stuart Billman

10 April	Otahuhu	13-7	Richmond	Carlaw Park
3:00	Try: A Thompson, Ray Halsey, V Gordon; Con: Jimmy Mullins 2		Try: Ron McGregor; Con: Jack Magill; Pen: Jack Magill	Referee: Jack Donovan

10 April	Marist	7-2	Newton	Carlaw Park 2
1:45	Try: N Silva; Con: Lindsay Simons; Pen: Bramwell		Pen: James Silva	Referee: George Kelly

10 April	North Shore	34-25	Ponsonby	Carlaw Park 2
3:00				Referee: Jack Hawkes

==== Round 2 ====
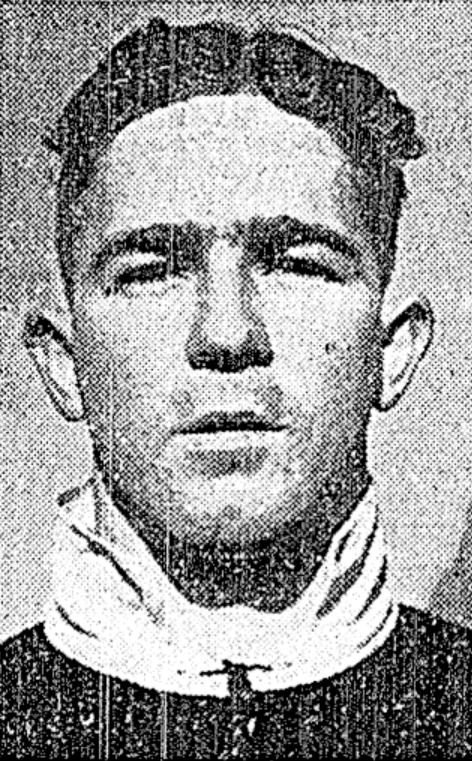
Arthur McInnarney

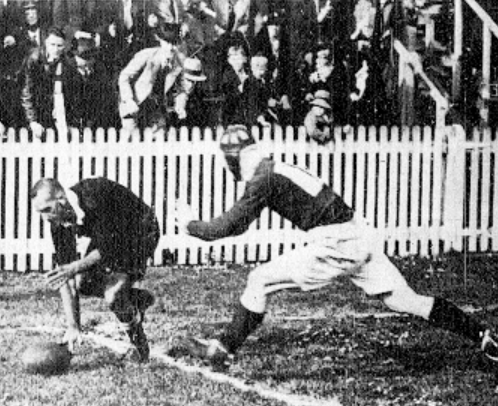
Arthur Kay scoring for New Zealand in 1935 against Australia.

New Zealand international Arthur McInnarney made a reappearance for Mount Albert after a year and a half out of the game due to him being in Army Camps and part of the New Zealand Tank Brigade based in New Zealand (he later departed to North Africa), while Bert Leatherbarrow kicked 4 conversions in their 20–13 win over Marist. Arthur Kay turned out once more for Ponsonby and was now in his 11th season in their senior side. He scored a try and kicked 7 goals in Ponsonby's 29–25 win over Newton. By the end of the season he had accumulated 496 career points for Ponsonby in all matches. For Newton, Ivan Gregory scored a hat trick while Jack Ginders scored two tries. Ginders had debuted for Newton in 1936 and had now accumulated over 100 appearances for them over the following 8 seasons. He finished his career with them with 109 games and 24 tries and was only the 5th player to reach the 100 club game milestone for them following Wally Somers (128), Claude Dempsey (169), Maurice Quirke (135), and Ted Brimble (131). Steve Watene turned out for Newton but re-joined Manukau later in the season. Tommy Chase kicked 4 goals in Manukau's 26–23 win over Otahuhu. Following this round of matches there were no official games the following weekend though some practice matches were played before the first round of the Fox Memorial kicked off on May 1.

17 April	Manukau	26-23 (13-15)	Otahuhu	Carlaw Park 1
3:00	Try: Kaui 2, Taylor 2, George Shilton, Peter Awhitu; Con: Tommy Chase 3 Pen: Tommy Chase		Try: Waitere 2, Johns, Jimmy Mullins, V Gordon; Con: Jimmy Mullins 2, J Speedy; Pen: Jimmy Mullins	Referee: Jack Hawkes

17 April	Ponsonby	29-25	Newton	Carlaw Park 1
1:45	Try: James Morrell 2, Arthur Kay, A Bedford, Raymond Lohenet; Con: Arthur Kay 5 Pen: Arthur Kay 2		Try: Ivan Gregory 3, Jack Ginders 2, Walker, Murray; Con: Ivan Gregory, Steve Watene	Referee: H Tate

17 April	City	35-19	North Shore	Carlaw Park 2
3:00				Referee: George Kelly

17 April	Mt Albert	20-13	Marist	Carlaw Park 2
1:45	Try: Herbert Zane-Zaninovich, Arthur McInnarney, Les Clement, Basil Cranch; Con: Bert Leatherbarrow 4		Try: Johnny Simpson 2, Dave McWilliams; Con: Cyril Wiberg 2	Referee: A Pearson

=== Fox Memorial standings ===
Team	Pld	W	D	B	L	F	A	Pts
Manukau	16	14	0	2	2	253	108	28
City Rovers	16	12	0	4	2	219	161	24
Richmond Rovers	16	11	0	5	2	247	123	22
Marist Old Boys	16	9	1	6	2	223	150	19
Mount Albert United	16	9	0	7	2	207	162	18
Otahuhu Rovers	15	4	2	9	3	122	204	10
Ponsonby United	15	4	0	11	3	163	231	8
Newton Rangers	15	3	0	12	3	154	313	6
North Shore Albions	15	2	1	12	3	123	259	5

=== Fox Memorial results ===
==== Round 1 ====
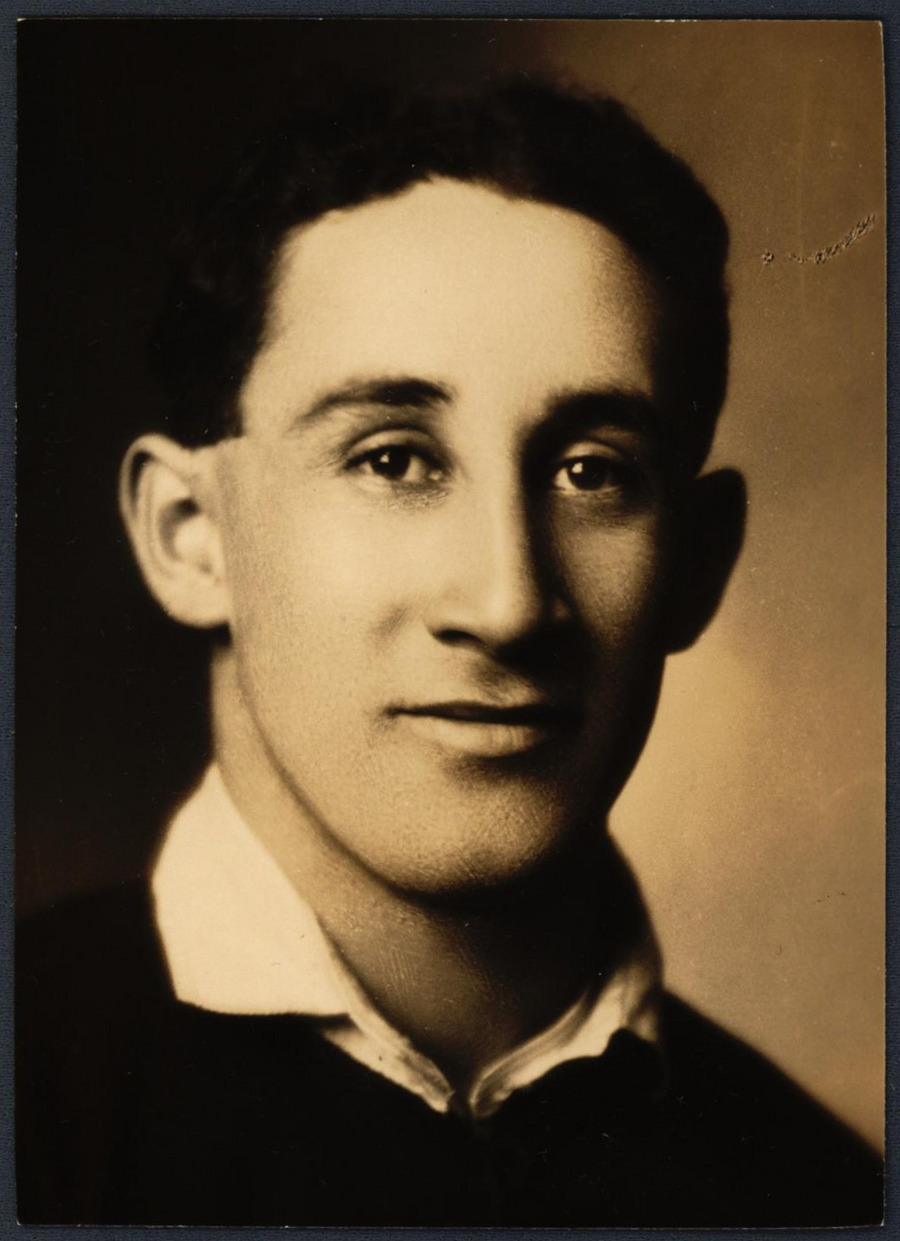
Dave Solomon

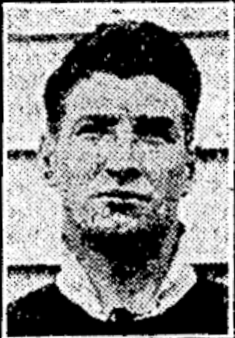
Cliff Satherley

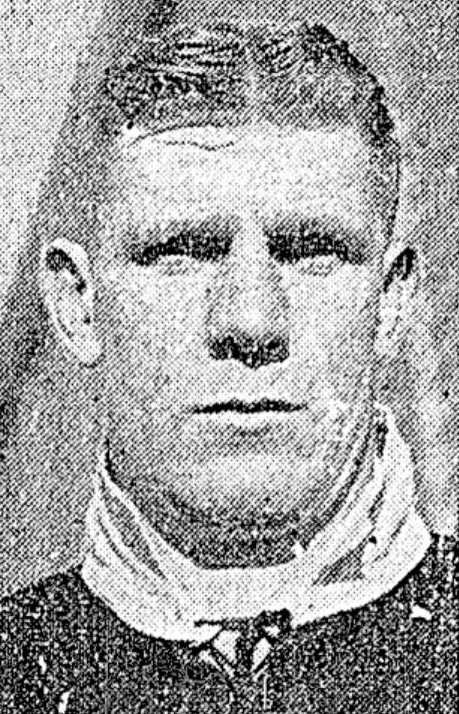
Wally Tittleton returned to the Richmond side.

Former New Zealand representatives Wally Tittleton and Cliff Satherley both reappeared for Richmond in their 16–12 loss to Newton. Satherley would die in tragic circumstances less than three years later after disappearing from Wellington Public Hospital in January 1947 with his body found on Lyall Bay Beach three days later. He had had an extraordinary rugby and rugby league career as a player, and he coached the Mount Albert senior side in 1937. Also making a reappearance for Richmond side was Wally Tittleton who had played for Auckland seven times, and New Zealand 15 times. He had also played several years of club and representative rugby league in the early 1930s. Tittleton at his familiar position of outside centre "played a solid game... and his experience was valuable to the younger members of the team". Tittleton had played for Richmond from 1936 to 1941 before spending a single season playing rugby union with many other rugby league players for the Motor Transport Pool (M.T.P.) team which won the Gallaher Shield in the Auckland club rugby competition. Newton had a very promising back line in their win over Richmond but the game was only "bright in pacthes" and the backs were not fully fit. Rangi at half back was good and Delamere at five eighth showed "penetrative ability" while they had secured the services of the Manukau centre, Ivan Gregory who was "one of the best in the code". Harry Richards had also returned to New Zealand after playing overseas and scored a try on the wing. The Auckland Star reported that the only Pākehā in the Manukau side was the 15st forward, R. Seymour who had joined the side from Papakura where he had played over 10 games for them in the 1941 season, mostly at fullback but the "youth" had "filled out" and was now in the forwards weighing 15 stone. The rest of the side were all Māori. Hawea Mataira was in his seventh season for City Rovers and scored a try in their win over Ponsonby and was said to be "the best forward in the ground". Pouvi Salaia played for City and scored a try. He was one of the first ever Pacific Island players to play rugby league in Auckland. Kiwi's Alf Mitchell and brother George Mitchell, along with Dave Solomon being a handful of others who had been born in the Pacific Islands. Salaia died in 1950 aged just 32 and was buried in Papakura Cemetery. City also had retained Doug Hutchison at halfback and the experienced pair of Alan Donovan and Robert Grotte in the five eighths. Hutchison had debuted in 1935 for City, while Donovan debuted in 1935, and Grotte had been with them for two seasons after joining from Marist. Grotte had also spent a season playing for St. George in New South Wales from 1935 to 1937 and played for New Zealand in 3 matches in 1938.

1 May	Newton	16-12 (8-2)	Richmond	Carlaw Park 1
3:00	Try: Ivan Gregory, Duncan, Jack Ginders, James Silva; Con: Harry Richards, Delamere		Try: Leo Davis, J McDonald; Con: Jack Magill; Pen: Jack Magill; Drop: J McDonald	Referee: George Kelly

1 May	City	17-13	Ponsonby	Carlaw Park 1
1:45	Try: Pouvi (Robert) Salaia, Fred James, Hawea Mataira; Con: Alan Donovan 2 Pen: Alan Donovan 2		Try: James Morrell, Arthur Kay, Beasley; Con: Arthur Kay 2	Referee: Stuart Billman

1 May	Marist	15-10	Mt Albert	Carlaw Park 2
3:00	Try: Ashley Best, Don McLeod, Lindsay Simons; Con: Cyril Wiberg; Pen: Lindsay Simons 2		Try: Basil Cranch, Herbert Zane-Zaninovich; Con: Basil Cranch; Pen: Bert Leatherbarrow	Referee: Jack Donovan

1 May	Manukau	22-5	North Shore	Carlaw Park 2
1:45	Try: Kingi Newton 2, Joe Murray, Kani, Tom Butler, R Seymour; Con: Joe Murray; Pen: Tom Butler		Try: J McArthur; Con: Jack Laing	Referee: H Tate

==== Round 2 ====
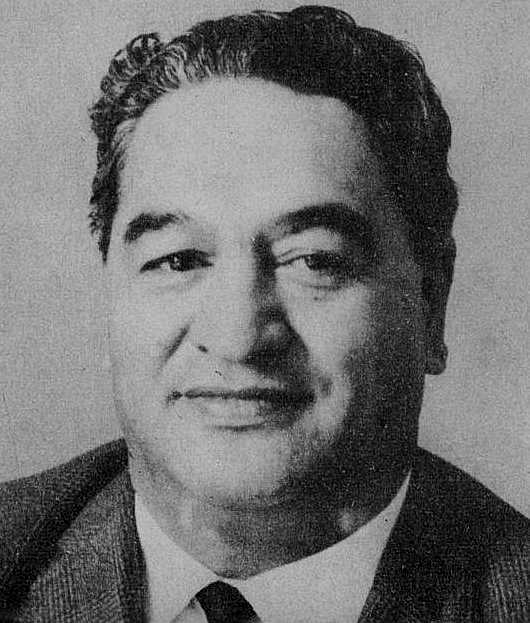
Steve Watene

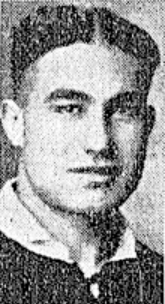
Hawea Mataira scored for City.

Otahuhu played their first match as a stand-alone club in the first grade since 1919 when they withdrew after just one match. In 1931 they were part of a combined Ellerslie-Otahuhu side in the first grade, finishing last out of 7 teams, and then in 1941 they were part of a combined City-Otahuhu side which finished runner up. They scored a surprise 19–18 win over Newton in the main game on Carlaw Park. Otahuhu beat Newton 19 to 18 largely thanks to the outstanding play of Jimmy Mullins in the five eighths. He scored a try where he "beat two opponents by crisp swerving" after some passing by the inside backs. He also kicked accurately converting both tries and adding three penalties. He was well supported by insides J Speedy, and Peter McManus who were "faster than the opposition". Experienced winger Ray Halsey "showed initiative on attack" and scored a good try. Newton suffered from reorganising their back line and before the end Ivan Gregory, their captain, had been moved from the three quarters to the five eighths. He scored a try after eluding the defence in the midfield and then running the distance to reach the line. Steve Watene turned out for Manukau as they were short in the forwards. There were two players injured by sprigs and “it was decided to make an inspection of all boots at frequent intervals during the season”. Manukau struggled to "settle down" against Richmond and were beaten 8–7. William Inglis played well for Manukau at first five eighth but Jack Hemi, and Tommy Chase were both absent so Tom Butler took the kicks and converted their lone try and kicked a penalty. They were short a player and so Steve Watene played in their forwards. He had played for Newton in the preliminary round matches. Mount Albert scored an upset 20–2 win over Ponsonby. Les Clement at halfback "gave a high class display of varied tactics which paved the way for most of the tries", while Herbert Zane-Zaninovich and A Jones (a promoted junior) "greatly assisted towards outplaying the Ponsonby rear division". Moore on the wing gave his "best display for some time" and Jack Zane-Zaninovich was moved from his usual five eighth position to full back where he "made a success" of the change. Jack Donovan refereed his 50th match between first grade sides in the City v North Shore match. City fielded a young player in Edwards at full back who "made a good impression". Alan Donovan once again showed what a prolific scorer he was with a try, a penalty and converting all three tries. The Auckland Star remarked that he "looks likely to be the first player to top the century" of points for the year. Ultimately though he fell slightly short.

8 May	Otahuhu	19-18 (15-7)	Newton	Carlaw Park 1
3:00	Try: Ray Halsey, Jimmy Mullins, Mick Johnson; Con: Jimmy Mullins 2 Pen: Jimmy Mullins 3		Try: Ivan Gregory 2, H Kendall, Harry Richards; Con: S Rangi; Pen: Ivan Gregory 2	Referee: Stuart Billman

8 May	Richmond	8-7	Manukau	Carlaw Park 1
1:45	Try: Leo Davis, William Kinney; Pen: Jack Magill		Try: Aubrey Thompson; Con: Tom Butler; Pen: Tom Butler	Referee: Jack Hawkes

8 May	City	20-5	North Shore	Carlaw Park 2
3:00	Try: Alan Donovan, Fred James, Hawea Mataira, Pouvi (Robert) Salaia; Con: Alan Donovan 3 Pen: Alan Donovan		Try: Halsey; Pen: Wait	Referee: Jack Donovan

8 May	Mt Albert	20-2	Ponsonby	Carlaw Park
1:45	Try: Moore 2, Arnold Jones, Les Clement; Con: Bert Leatherbarrow 2, Basil Cranch; Pen: Basil Cranch		Pen: Arthur Kay	Referee: George Kelly

==== Round 3 ====
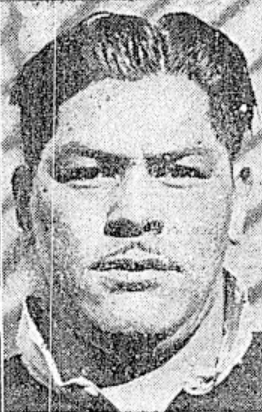
Pita Ririnui (Manukau)

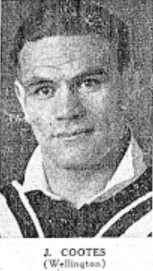

Pita Ririnui and Joe Cootes both turned out for Manukau for the first time this year. Ririnui reportedly weighed 17st while Cootes weighed 14st 8lbs. They proved too heavy for Otahuhu in the scrums as they won an even match 10–7. Cootes was a Wellington representative though had played in Auckland on occasion before. Otahuhu was said to have put up a "sterling effort" and led until the late stages but had to play a forward short in the last 15 minutes and Manukau finished strongly to win. Otahuhu had taken the lead with a try after a "splendid run" by Jimmy Mullins paved the way for a try to J Speedy. It looked like Otahuhu would not concede but a good effort by William Inglis and R Seymour saw the later score the winning try. Ralp Martin gave a "high class display" for Manukau at full back tackling well, while George Shilton and Potaka were good in the forwards. For Otahuhu, E McManus, their youngest back gave an "outstanding" display at five eighths while Mullins and Speedy "were also prominent" in the backs. City trailed Richmond 12-10 late in the match when Alan Donovan had a penalty shot in front of the posts but it hit the crossbar, however Richmond infringed again and another shot hit the post and also missed. Donovan "made amends" with three minutes remaining when he scored a try and converted it to win City the match 15–12. Bert Leatherbarrow scored a try and kicked 3 conversions in Mt Albert's 15–2 win over North Shore and "played splendidly in the loose", while in the backs two young three quarters Ivan Sumich and Bradford "showed speed". In Ponsonby's 16–9 win against Marist, Wilfred Dormer turned out for Ponsonby after not having played for them since 1940, while Dick Hull, former Auckland rugby representative was once again available for the Ponsonby forward pack.

15 May	Manukau	10-7	Otahuhu	Carlaw Park 1
3:00	Try: George Shilton, R Seymour; Con: Tom Butler; Pen: Tom Butler		Try: John Speedy; Con: Jimmy Mullins; Pen: Jimmy Mullins	Referee: Stuart Billman

15 May	City	15-12	Richmond	Carlaw Park 1
1:45	Try: Hawea Mataira, Robert Salaia, Alan Donovan; Con: Alan Donovan; Pen: Alan Donovan 2		Try: Jack Magill, Lipscombe; Con: Jack Magill; Pen: Jack Magill 2	Referee: H Tate

15 May	Ponsonby	16-9	Marist	Carlaw Park 2
3:00	Try: James Morrell 2, McDonnell, Thomas; Con: Arthur Kay; Pen: Arthur Kay		Try: White; Con: Barnes; Pen: Barnes 2	Referee: George Kelly

15 May	Mt Albert	15-2	North Shore	Carlaw Park 2
1:45	Try: Bert Leatherbarrow, Bradford, Arnold Jones; Con: Bert Leatherbarrow 3		Pen: C Meredith	Referee: Jack Hawkes

==== Round 4 ====
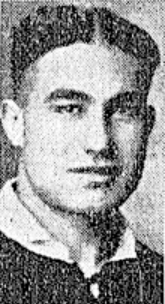
Hawea Mataira (City)

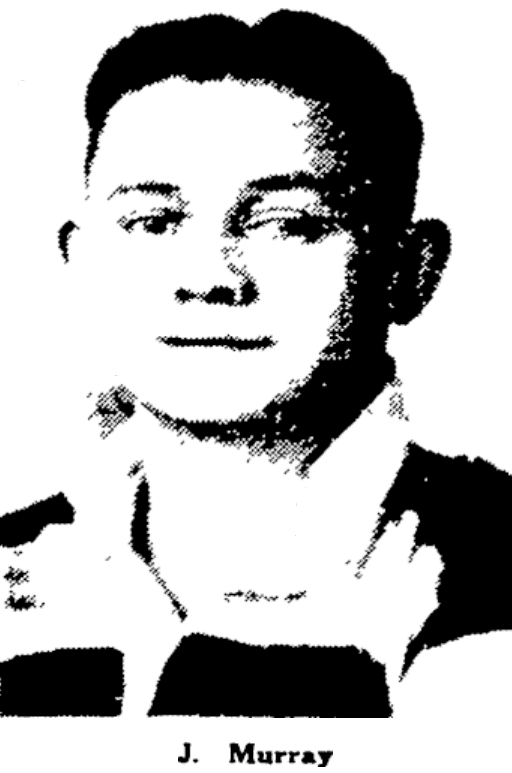
Joe Murray (Manukau)

North Shore Albions scored their 5,000 point in the 1st grade championship. They were the 3rd team to do it after Ponsonby and City. Their game was stopped at the 31st minute of the second half because it had kicked off late and the Marist – North Shore game was scheduled to kick off at 3:00pm and it was already 3:10pm when full time was blown early. For the second week in a row Alan Donovan won a match for City near the end. He kicked a penalty goal which were the only points in the match. Jimmy Mullins had a chance to draw the game with a penalty from close range but missed. Four times in the first half the City winger Fred James "roused excitement" when he made "dashing runs for the corner only to be hurled out over the sideline". Otahuhu went close to scoring when J Speedy the half back broke through and passed to E McManus, he sent it to V Gordon who sent it on to Riley "who looked certain to score" but he was tackled by Jack Silva who had come fast to prevent the try. Outstanding in the respective forward packs were Hawea Mataira for City, and Norm Johnson, one of the Johnson brothers for Otahuhu. Manukau beat Newton 13–0 with Ralph Martin playing a splendid "positional game" at full back, while Tom Butler and Joe Murray showed speed and thrust in the back line. Newton's play was marked by "a lack of combination", though Ivan Gregory, who had now moved into the five eighths was "outstanding". The Richmond backs gave a "splendid display of the best points of the code in defeating Mount Albert. Many movements showed speed and skill in spite of a greasy ball". Their half back J McDonald "shot out snappy passes" to Wally Tittleton and Reginald Harkins in the five eighths "who were a clever pair". At outside centre Ron McGregor gave a "versatile" display, and gave the "speedy wings" Bernard Lowther and Owen Payne "chances to show their speed". Lowther was said to be "one of the most promising three quarters in the code, he has pace and can swerve nicely. Above all he has determination". His son, Bernie Lowther would become a New Zealand representative in 1970 after also representing Richmond. Lowther junior played for Canterbury-Bankstown (1972–74) and South Sydney (1975–76). For Mount Albert Moore on the wing played a very good game while A Jones stood up well to McGregor at centre. Both full backs, Jack Magill (Richmond) and Jack Zane-Zaninovich (Mount Albert) fielded "superbly".

22 May	City	2-0	Otahuhu	Carlaw Park 1
3:00	Pen: Alan Donovan			Referee: H Tate

22 May	Manukau	13-0	Newton	Carlaw Park 1
1:45	Try: Tom Butler, A Tumata, Joe Murray; Con: Tom Butler, Joe Murray			Referee: George Kelly

22 May	Richmond	15-4	Mt Albert	Carlaw Park 2
3:00	Try: Ron McGregor, Bernard Lowther, Owen Payne; Con: Jack Magill 2 Pen: Jack Magill		Pen: Bert Leatherbarrow 2	Referee: A Pearson

22 May	Marist	11-8	North Shore	Carlaw Park 2
1:45	Try: Bill Glover; Con: Barnes; Pen: Barnes 2, Lindsay Simons		Try: Wadham 2 Con: Wait	Referee: Jack Donovan

==== Round 5 ====
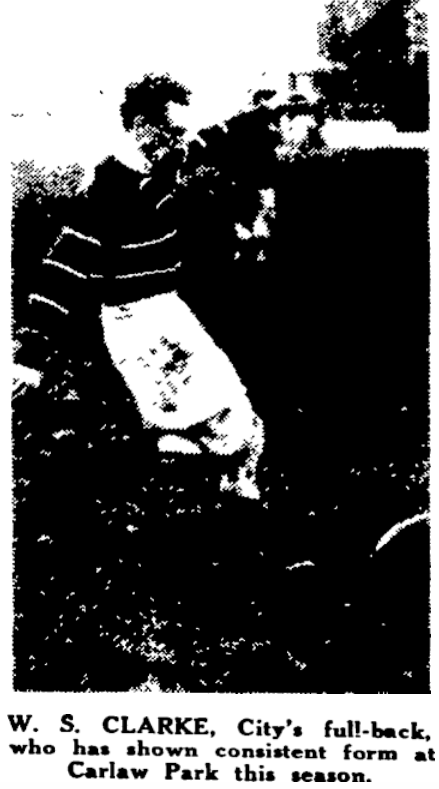
Warwick Clarke (City, in action in 1941)

Peter McManus in the forwards for City scored three tries in their 24–8 win against Newton. He was in the lock position. In the previous two seasons he had played in their back line and was at centre for the combined City-Otahuhu the previous year. For two of his tries sheer pace carried him away from a "double converging defence, and he raced away to score spectacular tries". Alan Legge "at five eighths gave an outstanding display". The Donaldson brothers were absent for City while Hawea Mataira was also unavailable, and for Newton the captain Ivan Gregory was also not able to play. An unnamed Newton forward was ordered off after "a good deal of hard play". Otahuhu captain Kenneth Finlayson scored a try in their 19–15 loss to Mount Albert. His father was Charles Finlayson who played cricket for New Zealand in 1928 against Australia, and rugby league for New Zealand in 1913 against New South Wales. Warwick Clarke played for City and kicked a conversion. He had been playing in Wellington the season prior though was with City prior to that. He would go on to play 11 tests for New Zealand. The star for Mount Albert was Basil Cranch who kicked two conversions and three penalties. Their tries came from Colin Cowley "who showed his best form" and Herbert Zane-Zaninovich in the forwards. Their entire back line from Les Clement at half back to Jack Zane-Zaninovich at fullback "gave a high class display of constructive football". Otahuhu lost one of their five eighths E McManus early in the game to injury. Richmond beat Marist 6–0 with the "speediest" back line in Auckland with William Kinney, Ron McGregor, and Bernard Lowther in the three quarters, while Reginald Harkins was "improving at first five eighths" and had the "mature" Wally Tittleton outside him. Jack Rutherford hooked well in North Shore's 11–9 win over Ponsonby. He gave their backs many chances which were "spurned", though J McArthur at halfback and L Brown in the five eighths played well while Owen Wilkie at centre was also "prominent". The best forward on the ground was said to be Dick Hull of Ponsonby who was in every movement. In the North Shore forwards Tom Field and Mercer "shared the honours". Arthur Kay had a poor kicking day missing all his goal attempts handing North Shore's their first win of the season.

29 May	City	24-8 (19-0)	Newton	Carlaw Park 1
3:00	Try: Peter McManus 3, Fred James, Jim Gould, J Hutchinson; Con: Jack Silva 2, Warwick Clarke		Try: H Kendall, A Silva; Pen: S Rangi	Referee: George Kelly

29 May	Richmond	6-0	Marist	Carlaw Park 1
1:45	Try: William Kinney, Wally Tittleton			Referee: Stuart Billman

29 May	North Shore	11-9	Ponsonby	Carlaw Park 2
3:00	Try: Jack Laing, Tom Field, Menzies; Con: Wait		Try: Roy Gee, James Morrell, John Bakalich	Referee: Jack Hawkes

29 May	Mt Albert	19-15	Otahuhu	Carlaw Park 2
1:45	Try: Colin Cowley 2, Herbert Zane-Vaninovich; Con: Basil Cranch 2 Pen: Basil Cranch 3		Try: Lipscombe, Kenneth Finlayson, John Speedy; Con: Jimmy Mullins; Pen: Jimmy Mullins 2	Referee: Pat Meehan

==== Round 6 ====
Robert Grotte, the City captain.

Mount Albert upset City 8–3 in a match which was played in heavy rain. For City Robert Grotte, who was captaining the side, and Warwick Clarke played well, handling the wet ball where others couldn't. In the City forwards Hawea Mataira and Peter McManus were "outstanding" with McManus using his great pace to "parry the Mount Albert backs". Mataira "was prominent in every branch of forward play". Colin Cowley was the best of the Mount Albert three quarters. Usually a centre or inside back he played on the wing and scored an opportunistic try when Grotte put in a weak clearing kick. Marist made a good effort against the much heavier Manukau side with Pita Ririnui and Steve Watene both weighing 17 stone. In Newton's 12–5 win against Ponsonby their star player was Ivan Gregory who gave his best performance of the season. Gregory scored two tries following "side stepping runs" and kicked a conversion and a penalty. C Delamere gave a "high class" attacking display in the five eighths. S Rangi gave good service from halfback and "used the stab kick to good advantage". The Ponsonby backs were criticised for once again kicking too much. Otahuhu and North Shore played an even game with the former not winning the game until late on. Cliff Wellm on the wing showed speed and determination in scoring his two tries while Colin Riley kicked two "splendid" left footed goals.

5 June	Mt Albert	8-3 (5-3)	City	Carlaw Park 1
3:00	Try: Les Clement, Colin Cowley; Pen: Basil Cranch		Try: Hawea Mataira	Referee: Jack Hawkes

5 June	Manukau	10-5	Marist	Carlaw Park 1
1:45	Try: Thompson, Joe Murray; Pen: Tom Butler 2		Try: W Rangi; Pen: Morrie Brockliss	Referee: Jack Donovan

5 June	Otahuhu	10-9	North Shore	Carlaw Park 2
1:45	Try: Cliff Wellm 2 Con: Colin Riley; Pen: Colin Riley		Try: Owen Wilkie; Pen: Wait 3	Referee: Stuart Billman

5 June	Newton	12-5	Ponsonby	Carlaw Park 2
1:45	Try: Ivan Gregory 2 Con: Ivan Gregory; Pen: Ivan Gregory, C Delamere		Try: Wilfred Dormer; Con: Webb	Referee: H Tate

==== Round 7 ====
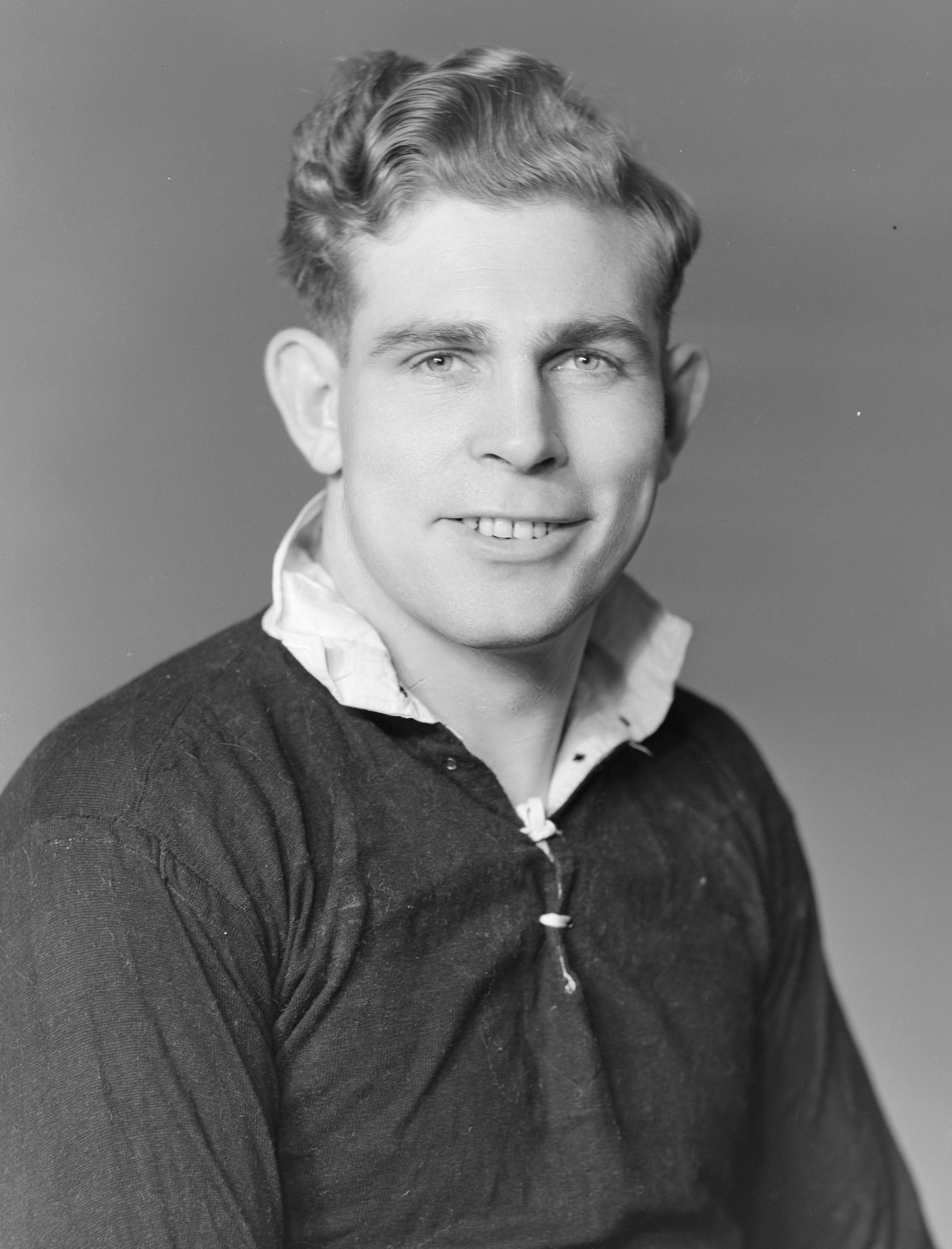
Johnny Simpson, a try scorer for Marist.

In the main match between City and Manukau which Manukau won 13–8, City suffered an injury to Owen Hughes, their hooker in the first half. He was replaced by Arthur Dufty who then limped for “most of the game”, and then Robert Salaia, their centre-three-quarter left the field with 20 minutes remaining with an injury leaving them a man short. The match was largely a battle between two well balanced forward packs. Hawea Mataira was the outstanding player for City and was well supported by Arthur Dufty, Walter Findlater. For Manukau their best was Steve Watene while Wiremu Te Tai, Thompson, Rogers, and George Shilton all played good games in the open with the last named showing skill in opening up play for his backs. Ralph Martin played a brilliant game for them at full back. The win meant a three-way tie for first with City, Manukau, and Mount Albert all equal on 10 championship points in the race for the Rukutai Shield, awarded to the team in the lead at the end of the first round. The Otahuhu captain on the day, Norm Johnson was ordered off based on a line umpire's report in their 21–8 loss to Marist. A feature of the game was the goal kicking by Lindsay Simons (Marist), and Colin Riley (Otahuhu). Simons converted two of their three tries and kicked four penalties from five attempts. While Riley kicked four penalty goals from difficult angles from six attempts. The Richmond backline impressed once more in a 22–7 win over Ponsonby. Bernard Lowther scored three tries on the wing while others who impressed were Ron McGregor at centre, and William Kinney on the other wing. Both players scored a try and it was suggested that they should play closer in as the five eighths (Owen Payne and J McDonald) were too slow. Des Williams played his first game of the season at half back for Ponsonby. He was in the army but hoped to be able to play some more games during the season. He had first played for them in 1939. Mount Albert defeated Newton 13-5 and the Auckland Star wrote that the Mount Albert side had been fortunate to secure the services of Clarence Wenthworth Conza, a 20 year old "noted distance swimmer" from the West Coast who was a rugby player also and weighed 13.5 stone. Conza wompeted in many swimming events in Auckland after moving there competing for the Waitemata club. They had also recruited G.E. Balcombe, a "sturdy forward", and A Jones, a second five eighth who had "good handling and ability to make play for his supports". Balcombe and Jones had both come from the Glenora club in West Auckland. Ivan Gregory the Newton captain and second five eighth was "by common consent ... the best back in the league game at the moment", while S Rangi is "exceptionally fast off the mark and his elusive running has made him a favourite with spectators".

12 June	Manukau	13-8 (5-3)	City	Carlaw Park 1
3:00	Try: Steve Watene, Joe Murray, Jack Major; Con: Tom Butler		Try: Eugene Donovan, Alan Legge; Pen: Alan Donovan	Referee: Stuart Billman

12 June	Mt Albert	13-5	Newton	Carlaw Park 1
1:45	Try: Arnold Jones, Herbert Zane-Zaninovich, P Caples; Con: Les Clement; Pen: G.E. Balcombe		Try: James Silva; Con: Roy Niwa	Referee: Jack Donovan

12 June	Richmond	22-7	Ponsonby	Carlaw Park 2
3:00	Try: Bernard Lowther 3, William Kinney, Owen Payne, Ron McGregor; Con: J McDonald 2		Try: Fowlds; Pen: Wilfred Dormer, James Morrell	Referee: Jack Hawkes

12 June	Marist	21-8	Otahuhu	Carlaw Park 2
1:45	Try: Johnny Simpson, Dave McWilliams, Cyril Wiberg; Con: Lindsay Simons 2 Pen: Lindsay Simons 4		Pen: Colin Riley 4	Referee: H Tate

==== Round 8 ====
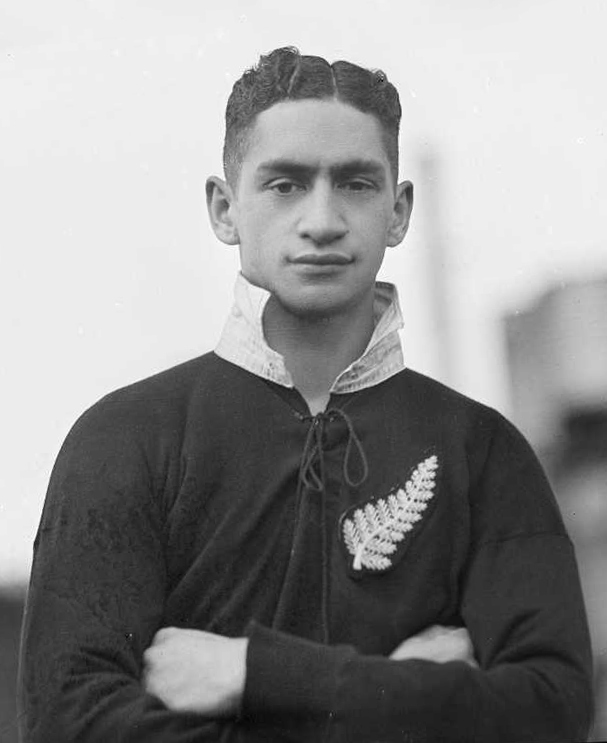
Jack Hemi

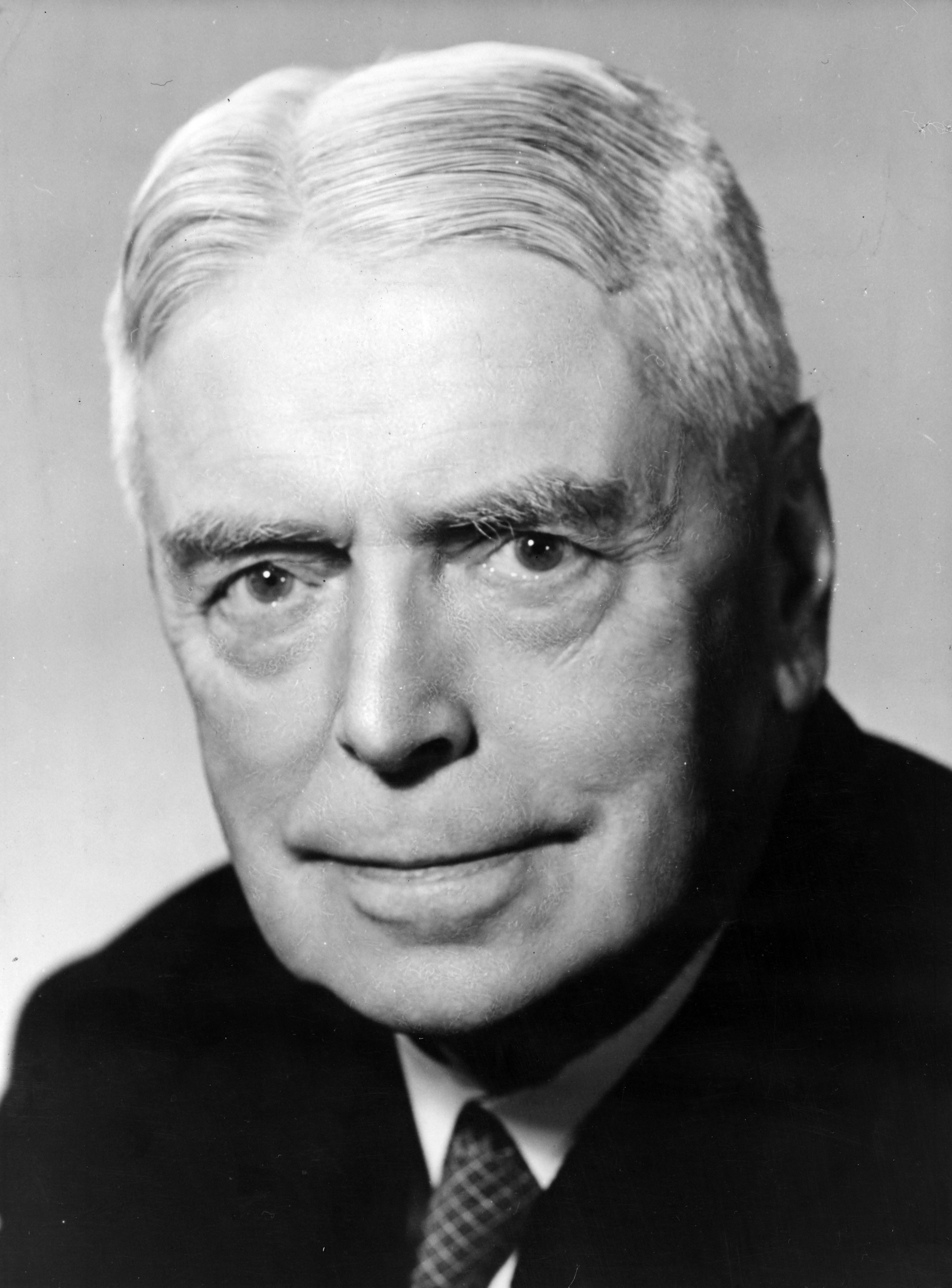
Walter Nash

Sir Walter Nash attended the matches at Carlaw Park and spoke to the crowd about the Liberty Loan proposal. At the time he was the Minister of Finance and he would go on to become the 27th Prime Minister of New Zealand in 1957. In the main match between Manukau and Mt Albert Jack Hemi made his first appearance of the season for Manukau and kicked 3 goals in their 26–12 win. His handling was said to be a feature of the match and was "perfect" with a heavy ball. At first five eighth he opened up play for his backs with Joe Murray at second five eighth "played with great dash". William Henry Inglis gave a good display at centre scoring a try and opening up play for his wings. He would be killed months after arriving to serve in World War 2. He was aged just 21 at the time of his death and was buried at the Cassino War Cemetery in Italy. Impressive on the wing for Manukau was A Taumata, a young player who had joined the side at the start of the season. He "handles well, and on the move travels fast, with the use of a sharp swerve to beat an opponent. Basil Cranch added to his points tally with 3 goals for Mount Albert. His younger brother Ray, who would debut a few seasons later had the senior B trophy named after him in 2020. The Richmond backs "worked smoothly and convincingly", scoring five tries in a 26–5 win against North Shore. J McDonald got the ball away from halfback "sharply", and Owen Payne and Wally Tittleton in the five eighths "blended their play nicely. While Ron McGregor in centre, and William Kinney and Bernard Lowther showed speed and were all "playing up to the best standard". Marist was now playing very good football and easily beat Newton 31–5. Their captain, Don McLeod, was always on the ball and scored three tries. They had a player named Knight in their forwards who was from the United States and was said to be picking up the finer points of the game. Dave McWilliams and Gerry Hughes combined well in the five eighths, with McWilliams being "outstanding" and scoring two good tries. While on the wing W Rangi "revealed speed and initiative". Otahuhu played a much better game than recent weeks and V Gordon was back at five eighth after several weeks absence due to injury and made several good openings for his backs. Morris and Speedy, the other inside backs "moved fast on attack".

19 June	Manukau	26-12 (13-2)	Mt Albert	Carlaw Park 1
3:00	Try: Martin Thompson, A Taumata, W Rogers, George Shilton, William Henry Inglis; Con: Jack Hemi 2 Pen: Jack Hemi, Tom Butler		Try: Herbert Zane-Zaninovich, Bowen; Con: Basil Cranch 2 Pen: Basil Cranch	Referee: Jack Donovan

19 June	Richmond	26-5	North Shore	Carlaw Park 1
1:45	Try: Ron McGregor 3, Wally Tittleton, Neale, Bernard Lowther; Con: McDonald 4		Try: Pascoe; Pen: J McArthur	Referee: Stuart Billman

19 June	Marist	31-5	Newton	Carlaw Park 2
3:00	Try: Don McLeod 3, Dave McWilliams 2, W Rangi 2, N Silva, Johnny Simpson; Con: Lindsay Simons 2		Try: Butler; Pen: Roy Niwa	Referee: George Kelly

19 June	Otahuhu	17-2	Ponsonby	Carlaw Park 2
1:45	Try: Doran, John Speedy, Mick Johnson; Con: Colin Riley; Pen: Colin Riley 3		Pen: C Meredith	Referee: T Tate

==== Round 9 ====
Manukau won the Rukutai Shield with a 7 win, 1 loss record through the first round. The Manukau forward pack was far too good for Ponsonby in their 24–7 win again Ponsonby. The Auckland Star wrote that "the forwards make every effort to open up the play. At least five tries came from the excellent passing of the forwards, and Ponsonby was bewildered at the speed of the big men. The whole set played like backs, and while this type of tactics are continued, it will take a really great team to down Manukau". Aubrey Thompson and Rudolph each scored two tries and Thompson was on track to be the highest try scoring forward in the competition once more. While George Shilton "is perhaps the most improved forward in the game, and knows all there is about the last man down in the pack play". In the Ponsonby side they introduced a new player, F. Gilbert who was six foot tall and weighed 15 stone "and is a decided acquisition". Dick Hull and Sullivan "also battled well". In the match between City and Marist, five eighth Maurice (John) Costello was "outstanding" and scored 3 tries. They had trailed 12–3 at halftime and after a try and penalty the third try to Costello on full time made the score 12–11. Lindsay Simons sent the conversion narrowly wide and City won. As was now usual, Hawea Mataira, the City forward played an outstanding game as was "the best forward on the ground". Peter McManus in the loose forwards assisted the backs well, while at half Doug Hutchison "gave good service", and captain Robert Grotte defended well, and Warwick Clarke at full back was "very sound". In the Marist side, apart from Costello, Dave McWilliams also played well in the five eighths, while Johnny Simpson, Don McLeod, and Knight, the American were "the pick of the forwards". Reginald Harkin scored three tries for Richmond on the right wing and "showed good hands and a nice turn of speed". He had been tried in the five eighths in earlier games but appeared to have found a more suitable position. Otahuhu showed a lack of finishing after halfback J Speedy and five eighth V Gordon played good games while K Simons on the right wing "showed dash and determination" with the few chances he got. Newton had a rearranged back line with S Rangi, Ivan Gregory, and Roy Niwa all absent, but Harry Richards who usually plays on the wing played a "splendid game at five eighths, as did James Silva who is also a three quarter. Alan Cleave replaced Rangi at half back and "gave excellent service". For North Shore J. McArthur who did not often kick sent over four goals. It was decided by the league to donate the proceeds from the day to the Liberty Loan which Walter Nash had spoken about the previous Saturday.

26 June	City	12-11 (12-3)	Marist	Carlaw Park 1
3:00	Try: Peter McManus, Doug Hutchison; Con: Alan Donovan 2 Pen: Alan Donovan		Try: Maurice Costello 3 Pen: Lindsay Simons	Referee: H Tate

26 June	Richmond	23-0	Otahuhu	Carlaw Park 1
1:45	Try: Reginald Harkins 3, Leo Davis, William Kinney; Con: J McDonald 4			Referee: Jack Hawkes

26 June	Newton	26-20	North Shore	Carlaw Park 2
3:00	Try: James Silva 2, J Waitere, G Mitchell, Harry Richards, H Kendall; Con: James Silva 3, Alan Cleave		Try: Owen Wilkie, Penman, Halsey, Horace Hunt; Con: J McArthur; Pen: J McArthur 3	Referee: Jack Donovan

26 June	Manukau	24-7	Ponsonby	Carlaw Park 2
1:45	Try: Aubrey Thompson 2, Rudolph 2, A Tumata, George Shilton; Con: Jack Hemi 2 Pen: Jack Hemi		Try: James Morrell; Con: James Morrell; Pen: Wilfred Dormer	Referee: J Kelly

==== Round 10 ====
Following some heavy rain the playing area was said to be in "good order". In the main match Marist and Mount Albert the play was described as "hard and non-spectacular".

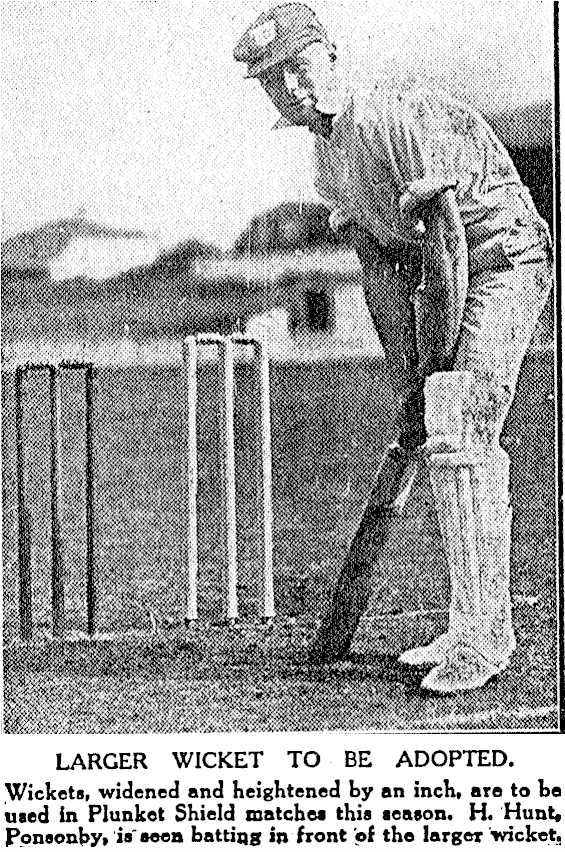
Horace Hunt, who captained the North Shore Albions and had also been the Auckland wicket keeper in the Plunket Shield.

Marist beat Mount Albert 11–7 in the main match at Carlaw Park with their "heavy-weight forward", A. Knight scoring "a great solo try". He had not played a league game prior to this season, but "made a clean break at half-way, and then used pace and changes of direction to work right through to the Mount Albert try-line and score". He had shown out in previous weeks. Knight was a United Nations serviceman from the United States. Manukau defeated North Shore 32–10 on the #2 field at Carlaw Park. Their forwards were outstanding again in open play, with George Shilton, Wiremu Te Tai, A Rogers, and Rudolph scoring six tries between them. It was said that Rogers "promises to go a long way... and like Aubrey Thompson is a splendid handler". And Potaka, while not a scorer "was perhaps the best of the forwards, following up always and tackling hard and low". During the game Manukau scored their 2,000th point in first grade championship matches. They had fielded teams in the 1912 and 1913 seasons but struggled, scoring just 3 wins and a draw from 15 games. They withdrew after 5 games of the 1913 season. After re-joining the competition in 1936 they formed a 66-6-33 record, and by the end of this 1943 season had added another 14 wins to go with their 2 losses. Former Auckland wicket keeper, and North Shore captain Horace Hunt scored a try for North Shore. Coincidentally he had replaced Verdun Scott 2 seasons prior as captain after he went to war. Scott himself was also the Auckland cricket wicket keeper and would return from war and officially become the only New Zealand rugby league representative to also play test cricket for New Zealand. In City's 25–15 win over Ponsonby, their forward Napier who weighed 15 stone and who had debuted the previous week was described as "a fast runner, and is a decided acquisition to the Ponsonby forwards". In Richmonds's easy 34–11 win over Newton, their backs once again excelled. J McDonald at halfback gave plenty of opportunities at halfback and "Payne and Tittleton worked in unison in the five eighths line, and McGregor in the centre showed great speed and ability to penetrate". In the losing side R. Duncan in the lock forward position was said to have been "fast from the mark... and quickly joined in attack or defence".

3 July	Marist	11-7 (5-0)	Mt Albert	Carlaw Park 1
3:00	Try: Dave McWilliams, W Rangi, A Knight; Con: Lindsay Simons		Try: Harold Gee; Con: Basil Cranch; Pen: Basil Cranch	Referee: Jack Hawkes

3 July	Richmond	34-11	Newton	Carlaw Park 1
1:45	Try: Bernard Lowther 2, Ron McGregor 2, William Kinney 2, Lyndsay Jack, Owen Payne; Con: J McDonald 3, Jack Magill 2		Try: Butler, N McKay, R Duncan; Pen: S Rangi	Referee: George Kelly

3 July	Manukau	32-10	North Shore	Carlaw Park 2
3:00	Try: George Shilton 2, Wiremu Te Tai 2, Tom Butler 2, W Rogers, Rudolph; Con: Jack Hemi 2 Pen: Jack Hemi		Try: Horace Hunt, Jock Rutherford; Con: J McArthur 2	Referee: Stuart Billman

3 July	City	25-15	Ponsonby	Carlaw Park 2
1:45	Try: Alan Legge, Doug Hutchison, Hawea Mataira, Alan Donovan, Gray; Con: Alan Donovan 4 Pen: Alan Donovan		Try: Napier, W McDonnell, Raymond Lohenet; Con: Webb 2 Pen: Webb	Referee: Jack Donovan

==== Round 11 ====
Carlaw Park was described as a quagmire for the round 11 matches. As a result, Jack Hemi employed a kicking game for his backs to chase. Flags flew at half-mast at Carlaw Park after the death of former New Zealand international Charles Finlayson. His son Kenneth was the hooker for Otahuhu senior side.

10 July	Manukau	6-2	Richmond	Carlaw Park 1
3:00	Try: Oswald Martin, William Inglis		Pen: Jack Magill	Referee: Stuart Billman

10 July	City	16-0	North Shore	Carlaw Park 1
1:30	Try: Robert Salaia 2, Fred James, Alan Donovan; Con: Warwick Clarke 2			Referee: George Kelly

10 July	Otahuhu	19-9	Newton	Carlaw Park 2
3:00	Try: J Speedy, Charlie Morris, Ray Halsey, K Simons; Con: Colin Riley; Pen: Colin Riley		Try: Duncan, J Waitere, Alan Cleave	Referee: H Tate

10 July	Mt Albert	19-3	Ponsonby	Carlaw Park 2
1:30	Try: Colin Cowley 2, Basil Cranch, G.E. Balcombe, W.C. McKinnon; Con: Basil Cranch, Les Clement		Try: Napier	Referee: Jack Donovan

==== Round 12 ====
With Richmond's 36–5 win over City they brought up their 4,000th point in first grade championship matches. They became the 5th team to achieve this behind Ponsonby, City, North Shore, and Newton.

17 July	Richmond	36-5 (11-5)	City	Carlaw Park 1
3:00	Try: William Kinney 2, Reginald Harkins 2, Ron McGregor, Leo Davis, T Kipa, Lyndsay Jack; Con: J McDonald 5, Jack Magill		Try: Eugene Donovan; Con: Warwick Clarke	Referee: Jack Donovan

17 July	Manukau	23-0	Otahuhu	Carlaw Park 1
1:30	Try: Aubrey Thompson 2, Joe Murray 2, Rudolph; Con: Tom Butler 4			Referee: Jack Hawkes

17 July	Marist	17-12	Ponsonby	Carlaw Park 2
1:30	Try: W Rangi 2, Ken Nicholson; Con: Lindsay Simons 2 Pen: Lindsay Simons 2		Try: James Brassey, James Morrell; Con: Webb 2 Pen: Webb	Referee: Stuart Billman

17 July	Mt Albert	20-10	North Shore	Carlaw Park 2
1:30	Try: A Jones, Harold Gee, Basil Cranch, Herbert Zane-Zaninovich; Con: Basil Cranch 3 Pen: Basil Cranch		Try: Owen Wilkie, Martin; Con: J McArthur; Pen: J McArthur	Referee: George Kelly

==== Round 13 ====
The outstanding player at Carlaw Park during the afternoon according to the Auckland Star was said to be Reginald Harkins, the Richmond five eighth who scored two tries in their win over Mount Albert. Both tries came after the wings in-passed. Their attack "was made impressive by Ron McGregor, who at times showed great speed in the centre, and at all times ran his supports into position before sending the ball on". The game was "hard and interesting" with forward play dominating. In the first half each team scored and unconverted try. The Richmond side turned a 3–3 score to 11–3 in their favour by full time thanks to tries to Harkins and a conversion to prop, Leo Davis. The try that turned the game came when McGregor ran 60 yards and Harkins who was racing in support took the final pass. For Mount Albert their half back, Les Clement "did some excellent work", while Herbert Zane-Zaninovich, Colin Cowley (backs), W.C. McKinnon, and S. Thomassen did "good work". For Richmond Davis, T Kipa, and R. Seymour were prominent. Seymour had to play at full back in the second half. Tommy Chase returned to the Manukau side in their 11–5 win over Newton after a long absence due to an injury earlier in the season. He played at wing three-quarter. A. Thompson debuted for Manukau at first five eighth and had "weight and pace, besides which he runs hard and straight in attack". Thompson was from the Hawke's Bay and not to be confused with Aubrey Thompson who had been playing at hooker for Manukau. Joe Murray was ordered off for Manukau and was severely cautioned by the league. For Newton Ivan Gregory, a former Manukau player "gave a good all-round display". Harry Richards at second five eighth and S Rangi at halfback were "impressive", with Rangi "very sharp in his work and is rated as the best attacking half back in the code in Auckland". On the number 2 field Marist easily beat North Shore by 21 to 6. Point scoring five eighth for Marist, Dave McWilliams scored a try and kicked a conversion on a field that became a sea of mud in places. It was commented that it would "take a spell of dry weather to make the playing area anything like it was six weeks ago". A feature of the game was the excellent forward play of Johnny Simpson, A Knight, and Don McLeod of Marist who all "worked hard all the afternoon and were in every movement". In City's one point win against Otahuhu (6–5) Silva scored two tries on the wing and "played fine football" and "used his pace to advantage" which secured the victory. At full back Warwick Clarke "gave a grand display of clean fielding, with useful placements in his return kicks". Noticeable in the game was the performance of Norm Johnson, the Otahuhu captain and Auckland representative who "repeatedly led the vanguard, and put in some effective work in the loose".

24 July	Richmond	11-3 (3-3)	Mt Albert	Carlaw Park 1
3:00	Try: Reginald Harkins 2, Bernard Lowther; Con: Leo Davis		Try: Colin Cowley	Referee: Stuart Billman

24 July	Manukau	11-5	Newton	Carlaw Park 1
1:30	Try: Pita Ririnui, A Thompson, George Shilton; Con: Tom Butler		Try: Ivan Gregory; Pen: Ivan Gregory	Referee: Jack Donovan

24 July	Marist	21-6	North Shore	Carlaw Park 2
3:00	Try: Dave McWilliams, W Rangi, Don McLeod, Ashley Best, Johnny Simpson; Con: Dave McWilliams, Don McLeod; Pen: Lindsay Simons		Try: L Brown, Mercer	Referee: C Day

24 July	City	6-5	Otahuhu	Carlaw Park 2
1:30	Try: Albert Silva 2		Try: Lionel Halsey; Pen: Colin Riley	Referee: George Kelly

==== Round 14 ====
In the main match City led Manukau 7–0 at halftime before conceding 18 unanswered points to lose 18–7. The result all but sealed the championship for Manukau. Jack Hemi showed good form for Manukau scoring nine of their points through three conversion and a try. The try came when he made a "weaving run which left the City backs standing" and saw him ground the ball between the posts. City were unfortunate to lose Hawea Mataira from their forward pack as he was their best forward, and his absence ... gave the Manukau forwards a decided advantage" which they exploited in the second half. The Manukau forwards were described as "lively" and consisted of Freddie McGuire, George Shilton, Rudolph, Potaka, A Rogers, and A Thompson. Of Rogers it was said that he "showed extraordinary dash and lasting power, and Thompson played a clever, constructive game. A heavily built player, he has been doing good work in the five eighth line. He is neat at handling the ball and getting it away to his supports". At full back for Manukau, Ralph Martin "gave an outstanding display of clever positional play... his defence being superb". While Joe Murray "played his best game this season... the three quarters, A Taumata and Butler, proved excellent attacking backs, and behind the scrum Major gave splendid service". Arthur Kay came back from injury for Ponsonby in their 15–2 loss to Richmond, while Roy Nurse also turned out for them for the first time this season and showed "dash in attack". Nurse would go on to represent New Zealand in 1946. For Richmond, Ron McGregor at centre was "brilliant" and "got two tries, one the result of great pace which carried him clear of opponents in a big run for the line". Marist and Otahuhu fought out a 5–5 draw which was considered a fair result although Jimmy Mullins missed a kick late in the game which could have won it for Otahuhu. The Auckland Star wrote that "it was rather surprising to see Mullins take a kick at goal in preference to [Colin] Riley, who has shown fine kicking form this season". Both forward packs played well with Johnson and Lionel Halsey being the pick of the Otahuhu forwards. It is unknown which Johnson brother the Star newspaper was referring to as there were four of them playing for the senior side in this era. For Marist, Don McLeod, Johnny Simpson, and A Knight "were prominent". In the backs Cliff Wellm at five eighths for Otahuhu was "the best back on the ground". He made several fine openings, and ran straight once the defence was beaten". Mount Albert beat Newton 22 to 16. Basil Cranch "played a good game at centre for Mt Albert, and he has shown consistent form this season. He is still a good club player, and has been for many years in the code. [Colin] Cowley, J. Zane[-Zaninovich] (fullback), and H. Zane[-Zaninovich], who took a place in the forwards, were always prominent".

31 July	Richmond	15-2	Ponsonby	Carlaw Park 1
1:30	Try: Ron McGregor 2, Bernard Lowther; Con: J McDonald, Jack Magill; Pen: J McDonald		Pen: Arthur Kay	Referee: H Tate

31 July	Manukau	18-7	City	Carlaw Park 1
3:00	Try: George Shilton, Joe Murray, Jack Hemi, A Thompson; Con: Jack Hemi 3		Try: Doug Hutchison; Con: Warwick Clarke; Pen: Warwick Clarke	Referee: Jack Donovan

31 July	Mt Albert	22-16	Newton	Carlaw Park 2
1:30	Try: Colin Cowley 2, Percival Caples, Herbert Zane-Zaninovich, A Jones, Basil Cranch; Con: Basil Cranch 2		Try: S Rangi 2, H Kendall, James Silva; Con: Ivan Gregory 2	Referee: Jack Hawkes

31 July	Marist	5-5	Otahuhu	Carlaw Park 2
3:00	Try: A Knight; Pen: Lindsay Simons		Try: Cliff Wellm; Pen: Colin Riley	Referee: George Kelly

==== Round 15 ====
Ponsonby played their 400th match in the first grade championship stretching back to 1910 when it started. It is highly unlikely that the club was aware of this fact as record keeping in the early decades was haphazard. North Shore played Richmond at the Devonport Domain. This was the only first grade match in the season played away from Carlaw Park. The 4th match at Carlaw Park was between Auckland Juniors and South Auckland Juniors. The main interest centered around the match between Manukau and Mount Albert which was played on a heavy ground. With Manukau winning 11-7 they had a four-point lead in the championship with just three rounds left thus close to securing the Fox Memorial championship. Two of Manukau's three tries were scored by Joe Murray who was playing at centre three-quarter. He was the top scorer in the competition in 1941 with a record 32 tries in senior competition games. Murray's first try came after an "orthodox passing" movement saw him take "the gap in a flash". While his second came after he chased a kick and skillfully gathered "a bouncing ball". The Auckland Star wrote that "Murray showed speed and dash in attack, and his second try was the turning point of the match". They also said that "a feature of the match ... was the capital display by the full-backs". Ralph Martin for Manukau "gave a sterling display, and showed coolness and resource in a match in which he had to do a big share of the defensive work". While for Mount Albert, Jack Zane-Zaninovich "played a colourful game and gave his best display of the season". Several times he "smothered" Manukau kicks and then put Mount Albert on to attack. Basil Cranch played "an outstanding game in the three-quarter line" for Mount Albert. Marist comfortably beat Newton 23–8 with the superiority of their forwards being the "decisive factor". Despite having an injured arm Ivan Gregory "again played an outstanding game for the losers". His try was one of the highlights after being started by fullback McKay "who cut through the Marist forwards in his own half, before sending on for Gregory to put in a sprint for the corner flag, with two defenders in pursuit".

7 August	Manukau	11-7 (3-5)	Mt Albert	Carlaw Park 1
3:00	Try: Joe Murray 2, Oswald Martin; Con: Jack Hemi		Try: Tommy Hetherington; Con: Basil Cranch; Pen: Basil Cranch	Referee: George Kelly

7 August	Marist	23-8	Newton	Carlaw Park 2
3:00	Try: Skinner 2, Johnny Simpson 2, Al Knight; Con: Dave McWilliams 3 Pen: Dave McWilliams		Try: T Kani, Ivan Gregory; Con: Ivan Gregory	Referee: Stuart Billman

7 August	Ponsonby	26-5	Otahuhu	Carlaw Park 2
1:30	Try: James Brassey 2, W McDonnell, Dick Hull, B Ririnui, Arthur Kay; Con: Arthur Kay 3 Pen: Arthur Kay		Try: J Speedy; Con: Colin Riley	Referee: H Tate

7 August	North Shore	14-8	Richmond	Devonport Domain
3:00	Try: Owen Wilkie, Mercer, W Seagar, Jock Rutherford; Con: Jack Laing		Try: Bernard Lowther, E Lipscombe; Con: Leo Davis	Referee: Jack Hawkes

==== Round 16 ====
Manukau officially secured their second Fox Memorial championship following their first in 1936 with Richmond's loss to Marist, which meant they were now 6 points clear with 2 rounds remaining. Following from Ponsonby achieving the feat, City played in their 400th match in the first grade championship. Marist defeated Richmond 23 to 7, with eight separate players scoring points. Despite being outweighed by their opponents they held their opposite pack in check. Johnny Simpson "was outstanding, and his game was up to the best representative standard" being the "best forward on the ground". While Al Knight "has made good progress in his first season in the league game, and his weight and ability to handle cleanly served his team well. James Brassey, winger for Ponsonby scored all of their tries in their 13-8 win over North Shore. The ball was regularly reaching him "largely due to the clever pivotal play of Arthur Kay" in the five eighths. In the second half North Shore dominated in the forwards and spent most of the time in the Ponsonby half but were unable to overtake Ponsonby on the scoreboard. Despite playing on a muddy ground, Mount Albert "made play as open as possible" and were able to score "several spectacular tries" to win 21–2 over Otahuhu. Les Clement at halfback "was a source of worry to the Otahuhu defence. He made clever openings, showed speed, and used the blind side to give Brady a try". Tommy Hetherington at five eighth, and Jack Zane-Zaninovich at full-back "were also in fine form".

14 August	Marist	23-7 (10-0)	Richmond	Carlaw Park 1
3:00	Try: Gerry Hughes, W Rangi, Johnny Simpson, Jimmy White, Skinner; Con: Lindsay Simons, Morrie Brockliss; Pen: Lindsay Simons, Dave McWilliams		Try: T Kipa; Con: Jack Magill; Pen: J McDonald	Referee: Jack Donovan

14 August	Ponsonby	13-8	North Shore	Carlaw Park 1
1:30	Try: James Brassey 3 Con: Arthur Kay, James Morrell		Try: Jack Laing, Horace Hunt; Pen: Jack Laing	Referee: Stuart Billman

14 August	Mt Albert	21-2	Otahuhu	Carlaw Park 2
3:00	Try: Les Clement, Harold Gee, Brady, Herbert Zane-Zaninovich; Con: Basil Cranch; Pen: Basil Cranch 2		Pen: Colin Riley	Referee: A Pearson

14 August	City	36-5	Newton	Carlaw Park 2
1:30	Try: Owen Hughes 2, Alan Donovan 2, Doug Hutchison, Eugene Donovan, A Silva, Arthur Dufty; Con: Alan Donovan 4, A Silva, Arthur Dufty		Try: Stevens; Pen: Roy Niwa	Referee: H Tate

==== Round 17 ====
In the Marist match with Manukau, Bill Glover kicked at the rolling ball and it went over the crossbar with the referee awarding a drop goal. Under modern ruling it would not be ruled a drop goal. The match featured fullback play of a "high standard" with Manukau's Ralph Martin fielding the ball "in a faultless way, and playing the running game in a daring manner" which opened up play for his fellow backs. While for Marist, Morrie Brockliss "fielded well, was never bustled into error, and tackled gamely every time he was called upon to defend". At halftime Manukau led 9-7 and then in the second half they "threw the ball about in great style, and made the play open". The Marist inside backs, Dave McWilliams and Maurice Costello "stood up well to more experienced opponents" in Jack Hemi and Joe Murray, while an injury to halfback Ken Nicholson was a "heavy handicap". In City's 15–7 win against Mount Albert their five eighth, Alan Donovan now in his sixth season in their senior side scored two tries "as the result of sharp following up", and kicked two conversions. They were without the services of Hawea Mataira and his brother W Mataira. Arthur Dufty and Wirepa Jackson both made their first appearances in the City pack for the season. Jackson had first played for them in 1939 but took 1942 off and had only just begun playing again. He had been regarded as one of the best forwards in the competition in 1941. Ponsonby was said to have played their best game of the season, scoring a 31–10 win against Newton. They struggled to field the same team from one week to the next. Their best players were Arthur Kay in the five eighths and Dick Hull in the forwards. Kay "made clever openings, and gave easily his best performance this season". The Auckland Star suggested that Hull "should find a place in the Auckland Pākehā team to play Auckland Māori. Two of their young backs, James Morrell (three quarter), and D Manley (five eighth) were "prominent" in the victory. Rapana played at fullback for the first time in many weeks and "revealed his brilliant form of last season". While Des Williams made a rare appearance at halfback and "gave excellent all-round service". Newton played their 400th game in first grade championship history, weeks behind Ponsonby and City. North Shore finished last for the 4th time in their history, the other occasions being 1910, 1918, and 1942. They finished with a 10–10 draw with Otahuhu. Pascoe debuted for North Shore in the five eighths and "paved the way for a try. he was elusive on attack". He was the brother of Pascoe in the forwards. Jock Rutherford, their hooker hooked cleanly and was said to be the likely hooker for the Auckland Pākehā side.

21 August	Manukau	22-15 (9-7)	Marist	Carlaw Park 1
3:00	Try: Tom Butler, Oswald Martin, Jack Major, Joe Murray, Steve Watene, George Shilton; Con: Jack Hemi; Pen: Jack Hemi		Try: McWilliams, Johnny Simpson, Skinner; Con: Lindsay Simons, Morrie Brockliss; Drop: Bill Glover	Referee: Stuart Billman

21 August	City	15-7	Mt Albert	Carlaw Park 2
1:45	Try: Alan Donovan 2, A Silva; Con: Alan Donovan 2, Warwick Clarke		Try: Colin Cowley; Con: Basil Cranch; Pen: Basil Cranch	Referee: George Kelly

21 August	Ponsonby	31-10	Newton	Carlaw Park 2
3:00	Try: D Manley 2, James Brassey 2, J Sullivan, Des Williams, Harold Gee; Con: Webb 3, James Morrell; Drop: Rapana		Try: Brady, N McKay; Pen: Hammond 2	Referee: Jack Hawkes

21 August	Otahuhu	10-10	North Shore	Carlaw Park 2
1:45	Try: J Speedy 2 Con: Colin Riley 2		Try: Martin, Owen Wilkie; Pen: J McCarthy 2	Referee: H Tate

==== Round 18 ====
Only two matches were played in the final round to find the runner up in the Fox Memorial competition. The reason being that in the event of champions Manukau also winning the Roope Rooster competition then the runners up would play them for the Stormont Shield. Manukau did indeed go on to win the Roope Rooster and as a result they played City, who beat Marist and hung on to second position, one win ahead of Richmond, who also had a 10–5 win over Manukau. The two matches were part of the inaugural 'Chairman's Day' where the chairman of the league had the opportunity to choose which teams would meet. Mr. J.W. Watson wrote “it is the chairman’s privilege on this day to put on any game in any way he thinks fit. It gives him the opportunity of extending hospitality to friends and particularly to supporters and officials of kindred sports. We hope to have a particularly good game this year. The match is between Manukau and Richmond, two teams which can be depended upon to provide a good, fast, open game of football”. Mr. Joseph Patrick Moodabe donated a trophy for the match between Richmond and Manukau. The day proved a success with the largest crowd of the “largest attendance of the season at Carlaw Park” with 15,000 present. Richmond caused a minor upset beating Manukau 10–5. They had an advantage after winning most of the ball from the set scrums. While their backs then "showed speed and resource on attack". For Richmond their young centre three-quarter Ron McGregor was brilliant and opened the scoring "with a spectacular try" which "was applauded for some minutes... [he] showed a fine burst of speed in running right around the defenders". Manukau drew level but McGregor "got the winning try as the result of great speed, sharp penetration and a swerve" and he received "a remarkable ovation from spectators". Seven minutes before the end of the game Richmond attacked through their backs with Williams sending the ball on to Leo Davis, Seymour and McGregor, who swerved past Taumata, and weaved his way through the defence to score a beautiful try. Their three quarter line of Williams Kinney, Ron McGregor and Bernard Lowther were all selected for the Auckland Pākehā team to play Auckland Māori. For Richmond, Frank Hilton played for the first time for some time and he worked hard "in both scrum work and loose play" He had played rugby union in 1942. In City's 8–5 win over Marist Hawea Mataira was once again absent. In the Marist forwards Don McLeod and Lindsay Simons "were outstanding". Ultimately the results meant that City was the runner up to Manukau which meant there was no necessity to play Manukau's fixture with Otahuhu.

28 August	Richmond	10-5	Manukau	Carlaw Park 1
3:00	Try: Ron McGregor 2 Con: Jack Magill 2		Try: W Rogers; Pen: Tom Butler	Attendance: 15,000; Referee: Jack Donovan

28 August	City	8-5	Marist	Carlaw Park 1
1:45	Try: Fred James, Doug Hutchison; Pen: Warwick Clarke		Try: Maurice Costello; Pen: Lindsay Simons	Attendance: 15,000; Referee: Stuart Billman

=== Roope Rooster ===
==== Round 1 ====
The Roope Rooster knockout competition began with Newton and North Shore playing a solitary match in round 1. North Shore lost and were the first side eliminated.

28 August	Newton	18-15	North Shore	Carlaw Park 2
3:00	Try: S Rangi 2, James Silva, Ivan Gregory; Con: Ivan Gregory 2, Hammond		Try: L Brown, Pascoe, Menzies; Con: McCarthy 2 Pen: McCarthy	Referee: H Tate

==== Round 2 ====
The standout match in round 1 of the Roope Rooster was the one between Mount Albert and City. At the end of normal time the match was tied 21-21 necessitating extra time. Basil Cranch kicked a penalty to give Mount Albert the win. Cranch stood out with the veterans form being "most consistent this season". He "made several fine openings and ran strongly through the centre". Ponsonby beat Otahuhu 19–10 with Brian Riley returning to the side after a long absence as he had been playing in a service rugby team in the Auckland Rugby Union competition. He had first played for Ponsonby in 1933 and represented New Zealand in 1935 and again in 1937 in addition to playing eighth games for Auckland. His presence at centre three-quarter made them more effective and he was the "perfect partner" for Arthur Kay at second five eighth. Riley's "speed and elusiveness made him the outstanding player of the match". In Richmond's 30–5 win over Marist the standout was their fullback, Jack Magill. He kicked five conversions, some from wide angles, and a penalty as well as "playing a splendid game". Richmond fielded an unusual back line with usual half back, J McDonald playing on the wing, and Seymour and J Mitchell paired in the five eighths for the first time. While Marist who fielded a weakened side brought White into the five eighth line, where he showed good defence and the "ability to penetrate in attack". N Silva also played "impressively in the Marist three-quarter line".

11 September	Ponsonby	19-10	Otahuhu	Carlaw Park 1
1:30	Try: Brian Riley, McDonnell, Raymond Lohenet, James Morrell, Arthur Kay; Con: Webb 2		Try: Cliff Wellm, Ray Halsey; Con: Colin Riley; Pen: Colin Riley	Referee: Jack Hawkes

11 September	Richmond	30-5 (15-2)	Marist	Carlaw Park 1
3:00	Try: L Williams 2, McDonald, Ron McGregor, Henry Sale, Bernard Lowther; Con: Jack Magill 5 Pen: Jack Magill		Try: W Rangi; Pen: Cyril Wiberg	Referee: George Kelly

11 September	Manukau	20-4	Newton	Carlaw Park 2
1:30	Try: Jim Murray, Oswald Martin, Rudolph, Aubrey Thompson; Con: Tom Butler 3 Pen: Tom Butler		Pen: Ivan Gregory 2	Referee: H Tate

11 September	Mt Albert	23-21	City	Carlaw Park 2
3:00	Try: Basil Cranch 2, A Jones, Les Clement, Harold Gee; Con: Basil Cranch; Pen: Basil Cranch 3		Try: Peter McManus 2, Eugene Donovan, Wirepa Jackson, Hawea Mataira; Con: Warwick Clarke 2, Alan Donovan	Referee: Stuart Billman

==== Semi finals ====
Ponsonby continued their late season improved form. Brian Riley had returned to the side the week prior and against Richmond he scored 4 tries in a "brilliant attacking game". His "swerve and elusive running was too much for the Richmond inside backs to cope with". Arthur Kay (second five eighth) and Roy Nurse (wing) were the other Auckland representative players to play in their back line. Richard Shalfoon scored a try for Manukau at half back. Shalfoon sent the ball away from the scrums using an orthodox pass at times but "when he used the dive-pass he got greater speed with accuracy and long range". He "showed skill and sharpness in opening up attack and gave a very convincing display". At half time Manukau led 5-2 and the only points in the second half came from a try to Shalfoon following some "splendid play by A Rogers", a Manukau forward. Ralph Martin "played his usual sound game at fullback for Manukau, but the best back on the ground was [Joe] Murray, who played splendidly at five eighths". In their forwards, Rogers, George Shilton, and Thompson "were the pick".

18 September	Manukau	8-2 (5-2)	Mt Albert	Carlaw Park 1
3:00	Try: George Shilton, Richard Shalfoon; Drop: Joe Murray		Pen: Basil Cranch	Referee: Stuart Billman

18 September	Ponsonby	19-14	Richmond	Carlaw Park 1
1:45	Try: Brian Riley 4, Arthur Kay; Con: Webb 2		Try: Lyndsay Jack, Bernard Lowther; Con: J McDonald; Pen: J McDonald, Jack Magill 2	Referee: H Tate

==== Roope Rooster final ====
Manukau became the eighth team to win the senior championship and the Roope Rooster. Interestingly there were now four clubs who had all achieved the feat twice in their history. City Rovers won both for the first time in 1916 and did it again in 1921, Ponsonby won both titles in 1917 and 1930, then Richmond Rovers did it in 1934 and 1940, before Manukau joined them by winning both in 1936, and again with this 21–9 win over Ponsonby. Ponsonby included O Hadley from the Army and Auckland team of 1942. There was a large attendance for the 1943 final and in the "closing stages of the match the forwards of both teams indulged in rough play and the referee, Mr. [Jack] Donovan, had occasion to warn several players". Joe Murray was absent for the Manukau side so Oswald Martin came into second five eighth, and Jack Hemi moved out to centre three-quarter where he scored "a good try with clever attack, and kicked two goals, one a remarkable shot from long range". Hemi was also "unselfish in his play" and assisted his wings well with A Taumata scoring two tries. The Herald wrote that the Ponsonby "backs indulged in too much kicking and in consequence Manukau made the most of its possession of the ball". Rogers, the Manukau loose forward scored a "brilliant try" in the first half which helped them to a 10-4 half time lead. Manukau dominated the second half, attacking "for most of the time, and there was more finish to their loose football". Steve Watene was "outstanding", while Pita Ririnui and Wiremu Te Tai all "prominent in the loose". In the Ponsonby forward pack Dick Hull "was the best... although he received a lot of unnecessary attention from his opponents".

25 September	Manukau	21-9 (10-4)	Ponsonby	Carlaw Park 1
3:00	Try: A Taumata 2, Puti Tipene Watene, Jack Hemi, W Rogers; Con: Jack Hemi; Pen: Jack Hemi		Try: Des Williams; Con: Webb; Pen: Webb 2	Referee: Jack Donovan

=== Phelan Shield ===
==== Semi finals ====
Otahuhu easily beat Richmond 32-3 whose only points came from a try to Ron McGregor, the future 1947-48 New Zealand representative. For Otahuhu, their wings K Simons and Ray Halsey each scored two tries, "largely as the result of sharp passing by J Speedy from the base of the scrum, and clever attacking play by [Charlie] Morris, in the five eighth line". At full back, Colin Riley played "a good game" and kicked four conversions. For City in their similar 32–0 defeat of North Shore, F Ittal scored three tries, while Taylor scored twice. Other backs Owen Hughes, and Alan Donovan all added a try, along with Peter McManus in the forwards, with Donovan converting three and adding a penalty.

25 September	Otahuhu	32-3	Richmond	Carlaw Park 1
1:45	Try: K Simons 2, Norm Johnson 2, Ray Halsey 2, Charlie Morris, J Speedy; Con: Colin Riley 4		Try: Ron McGregor	Referee: H Tate

25 September	City	32-0	North Shore	Carlaw Park 2
1:45	Try: F Wittall 3, Taylor 2, Peter McManus, Owen Hughes, Alan Donovan; Con: Alan Donovan 3 Pen: Alan Donovan			Referee: George Kelly

==== Semi final ====
The semi final between Mt Albert and City received no newspaper coverage at all. Mt Albert won the match however as they advanced to the final to play Otahuhu.

9 October	Mt Albert	unknown	City	Carlaw Park 2
1:30

==== Phelan Shield final ====
16 October	Mt Albert	12-11	Otahuhu	Carlaw Park 2
1:45	Try: Caples, Les Clement; Con: Basil Cranch 2 Pen: Basil Cranch		Try: Cliff Wellm; Con: Colin Riley; Pen: Colin Riley 3	Referee: Jack Hawkes

=== Stormont Shield final ===
The Stormont Shield final was played in heavy rain which made playing difficult, with Manukau coming out on top 12–9 to win the Stormont Shield for the 3rd consecutive season. The score had been 0–0 at halftime before Manukau scored 7 points. City responded with 3 tries to take a 9–7 lead before a Manukau back line break with 4 minutes to go saw A Taumata pass to Jack Hemi who cut past Robert Salaia and then “beat Warwick Clarke badly to score the winning try”. It was described in the Auckland Star as coming "after one of the greatest individual efforts seen at the park". City had been leading by two points with a few minutes left when Manukau attacked and Joe Murray "broke clear, and sent to Hemi, to Taumata. The wing ran strongly along the right side line, drew his marker, shot an in-pass to Hemi, who beat Warwick Clarke, the City full-back, with a side-step, and then led a City pursuit for 50 yards until he scored". Doug Hutchison, the City halfback had done his best to haul down Hemi but he scored in the clutches of him as he crossed the line to win the match. The forward packs of both sides were very heavy. In the City team was Hawea Mataira, now in his seventh season for them, and Bert Leatherbarrow who made his first appearance for City after transferring from Mount Albert. He had scored 27 points for Mount Albert in six games to start the season before suffering from rheumatism which led to a court case with his employer. He missed fourteen games before reappearing in a City jersey. Also in their pack was Wirepa Jackson who had played for them since 1939 and was "outstanding on the day". For Manukau they fielded their "17 stone pair, Steve Watene, Pita Ririnui, plus Aubrey Thompson, the 15st 4lb former Hawke's Bay forward, and Wiremu Te Tai, a 14st hooker. For sheer weight Manukau had the advantage, and in parts of the game [George] Shilton, the loose forward, was able to play as an extra back".

2 October	Manukau	12-9 (0-0)	City	Carlaw Park 1
3:00	Try: W Rogers, Jack Hemi; Con: Jack Hemi 2 Pen: Jack Hemi		Try: Doug Hutchison, Robert Salaia, Hawea Mataira	Referee: Stuart Billman

=== Top try scorers and point scorers ===
The try and point scoring lists were compiled from the preliminary round matches, Fox Memorial, Roope Rooster, Phelan Shield, and Stormont Shield matches. Ron McGregor was in his second season for Richmond and led all try scorers with 15. Bernard Lowther was three back on 12 with Joe Murray, the prolific try scorer for Manukau another try back along with Newton centre Ivan Gregory. Basil Cranch finished first with the most points (97), from 20 games. Alan Donovan (City) scored 92 points and was second once more after scoring 100 points in 1942. Jack Hemi scored 49 points but had re-joined Manukau midway through the season. He had now finished his career with Manukau with 724 points for them in 108 games through 8 seasons.

Top try scorers
Rk	Player	Team	Games	Tries
1	Ron McGregor	Richmond	19	15
2	Bernard Lowther	Richmond	15	12
3=	Ivan Gregory	Newton	13	11
3=	Joe Murray	Manukau	18	11
5=	Alan Donovan	City	19	10
5=	George Shilton	Manukau	20	10
7=	Colin Cowley	Mount Albert	13	9
7=	Basil Cranch	Mount Albert	20	9
7=	James Morrell	Ponsonby	17	9
7=	W Rangi	Marist	13	9
7=	Johnny Simpson	Marist	18	9
7=	Herbert Zane-Zaninovich	Mount Albert	21	9

Top point scorers
Rk	Player	Team	G	T	C	P	DG	Pts
1	Basil Cranch	Mount Albert	20	9	19	16	0	97
2	Alan Donovan	City	19	10	20	11	0	92
3	Ivan Gregory	Newton	13	11	5	8	0	59
4	Jack Magill	Richmond	20	1	17	10	0	57
5	J McDonald	Richmond	20	4	19	2	1	56
6	Colin Riley	Otahuhu	15	0	15	12	0	54
7	Lindsay Simons	Marist	19	3	9	13	0	53
8	Tom Butler	Manukau	20	5	11	7	0	51
9=	Arthur Kay	Ponsonby	12	5	12	5	0	49
9=	Jack Hemi	Manukau	13	3	14	6	0	49

=== Other club matches ===
==== Wellington Māori v City ====
In August, when City had a bye they travelled to Wellington to play the Wellington Māori side. They were almost entirely made up of the Aotea Club team with the exception of 3 players. The locals proved too strong before a "large crowd", winning 31–13 at Newtown Park. City were captained by Steve Watene as a guest player as he was playing with Manukau at the time. Hawea Mataira also made the trip to play against his brother W Mataira, who was hooker for the Wellington Māori side.

7 August	Wellington Māori	31-13	City	Newtown Park, Wellington
3:00	Try: M Solomon 3, K Morgan, T Rei, J Rangiwhetu, P Barton; Con: D Greenland 5		Try: Doug Hutchison, Steve Watene, A Silva; Con: Alan Donovan 2

==== Manukau v Blackball (West Coast) ====
On October 16 Blackball, the West Coast champions came to Auckland to play the Auckland champions, Manukau. Blackball had beaten the Christchurch champions, Sydenham by 43 points to 6, and then the Wellington champions, Petone, by 34 points to 7. Jack Amos, the South Island selector had said that they were the best club side that he had ever seen. They were coached by former New Zealand player, Johnny Dodds and captained by Ces Mountford who would later play for Wigan for many years and coach the New Zealand side. The game was played before an enormous crowd of 17,000 and was close for 60 minutes. Manukau led 5–4 at halftime before Blackball took the lead and with 60 minutes gone the score was 9–5 in their favour following a "fast passing bout, in which six players handled" and Ces Mountford "scored a great try" which Ray Nuttall converted. Nuttall at fullback "played a splendid game" however it was Mountford who was said to have been the best back on the ground with his impressive positional play. However the heavier Manukau forward pack wore them down and scored several late tries. Ces Mountford's brothers William Mountford at centre three-quarter and Kenneth Mountford at the back of the forward pack both played brilliantly. Manukau was captained by loose forward George Shilton. They fielded their usual heavy pack with Pita Ririnui (17st 7lb), Steve Watene (16.7), Aubrey Thompson (15.4), and hooker Wiremu Te Tai (14.0). As a result, they were able to win the set scrums "by the simple expedient of walking over the ball". Watene led the forwards well while Ririnui was prominent with his hard running being difficult for the Blackball forwards to handle. In one run which resulted in a try he "simply brushed all high tackling aside and got close to the Blackball try-line before he sent the ball on to a support". In their backline Jack Hemi scored a try and kicked three conversions and a drop goal at five eighth. The try came from backing up a big run by George Shilton while the drop goal was a result of quick thinking when a Blackball player kicked down field from in front of his posts and Hemi fielded and kicked the drop goal. Joe Murray crossed for two tries from the inside centre position. In addition to Hemi and Hurray, A Taumata on the wing also revealed his best form.

16 October	Manukau	23-9 (5-4)	Blackball	Carlaw Park 1
3:00	Try: Joe Murray 2, Tom Butler, A Taumata, Jack Hemi; Con: Jack Hemi 3 Drop: Jack Hemi		Try: Ces Mountford; Con: Ray Nuttall; Pen: Ray Nuttall 2	Attendance: 17,000; Referee: Jack Donovan

== Lower grades ==
The junior control board advised in October that the J.F.W. Dickson Medal, presented for the best behaved player was won by M. Ryan of the Pt Chevalier club, and the trophy for the runner up was awarded to Alec Dracevich of Glenora. Pt Chevalier won the Davis Points Shield and the Tracy Inglis Shield for scoring the most championship points in all grades. They had a particularly successful season, winning the 3rd, 5th, and 7th grades, and also winning the 7th grade knockout competition. The 3rd grade side won the championship beating City on October 16 in the final after both sides had a 14–2 record. The New Zealand Herald and Auckland Star devoted almost no coverage whatsoever to any grade below the senior competition and as a result it is unknown how many teams played in any of the lower grades and from what clubs. On September 30 however the Auckland Star did report that in addition to Point Chevalier's grade wins, Richmond Rovers won the fourth grade, and Mt Albert won the sixth grade. Despite no coverage of lower grade competitions the Ellerslie United club advertised the opponents and venue of their lower grade sides throughout the season and so the following lists of teams in those particular grades have been compiled along with a June 26 program.

Winning team in bold.

=== Senior B ===
Ellerslie and Green Lane. Ellerslie seemingly withdrew from this grade early in the season.

=== Third grade ===
Pt Chevalier, City, Richmond, Ellerslie, Glenora, Green Lane, Manukau, Mt Albert A, Mt Albert B, Point Chevalier, Otahuhu, and Ponsonby.

=== Fourth grade ===
Richmond, Avondale, Ellerslie, Newton, North Shore, Northcote, Point Chevalier, Otahuhu, Papakura, and Ponsonby.

=== Fifth grade ===
Point Chevalier, Avondale, Ellerslie, Green Lane, Newton, and Mount Albert.

=== Sixth grade ===
Mount Albert, Richmond, Marist, Ponsonby, and Green Lane. Mount Albert also won the knockout final 16-0 on September 25.

=== Seventh grade ===
Pt Chevalier, Mt Albert and Newton. Point Chevalier won the knockout competition.

=== Schoolboys ===
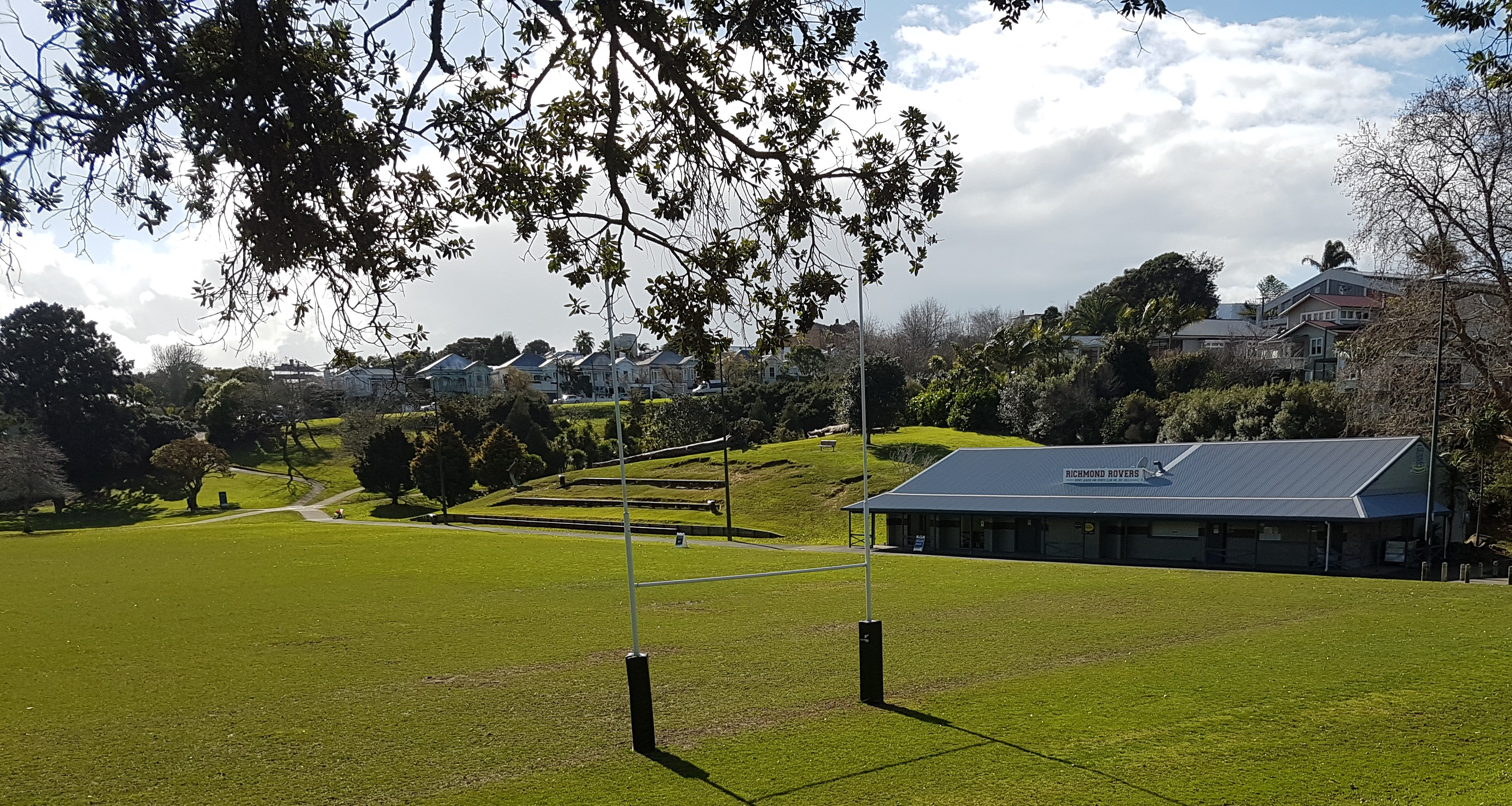
Grey Lynn Park

In a match at Grey Lynn Park, Alexander Edmund Kirkland fractured his left shoulder while playing for Otahuhu.

==== Intermediate ====
Mount Albert, Ellerslie, Glenora, Green Lane, Marist, Mount Albert, Otahuhu, Papakura, Ponsonby, Richmond Mount Albert beat Marist in the final on September 25 by 6 points to 3.

==== Juniors ====
Ellerslie, Glenora, Green Lane, Marist, Mount Albert, Point Chevalier

==== Seven-A-Side ====
Mount Albert beat Marist 4-0 in the final on September 25.

== Representative season ==
Auckland only played 2 matches and on each occasion was below strength. For the first match against South Auckland in Huntly they were made up of players from 5 of the 9 clubs, while in the return match they were missing players from the champion Manukau side who had travelled to Taihape to play the Taihape Māori rugby side. They were selected by Bill Cloke, Dougie McGregor, and Jack Kirwan.

=== Representative matches ===
==== Auckland Pākehā v Auckland Māori ====
Jack Hemi went off injured before halftime for the Māori side and was replayed by Oswald Martin.

4 September	Auckland Pākehā	13-13	Auckland Māori	Carlaw Park 1
3:00	Try: William Kinney, Don McLeod, Thomas Field; Con: Warwick Clarke; Pen: Warwick Clarke		Try: A Taumata, Joe Murray, Aubrey Thompson; Con: Jack Hemi; Drop: Ralph Martin	Referee: Stuart Billman

==== South Auckland v Auckland ====
The Auckland side which traveled to Huntly was only made up of players from the city, Marist, Newton, North Shore and Otahuhu sides. The other four teams were all playing in the semi-finals of the Roope Rooster. Horace Hunt from the North Shore club played for Auckland. He had previously represented Auckland at cricket in the summer of 1929/30 in 4 Plunket Shield matches. Interestingly he had taken over the captaincy of North Shore in 1941 when Verdun Scott went away to war, himself a wicket keeper for New Zealand as well as a New Zealand rugby league representative.

18 September	South Auckland	29-15 (21-0)	Auckland	Davies Park, Huntly
2:45	Try: James Sheeran 2, Owen Brooks, L Smith, G Moyes, Samson, F Williams; Con: Owen Brooks 2 Pen: Owen Brooks 2		Try: Ray Halsey, Dave McWilliams, Jock Rutherford; Con: Warwick Clarke 2 Pen: Warwick Clarke

==== Auckland v South Auckland ====
Auckland selectors Bill Cloke, Dougie McGregor, and Jack Kirwan chose future New Zealand representative Warwick Clarke to play at fullback. McGregor's nephew Ron McGregor was chosen in the three quarters after an outstanding season for Richmond and would later go on to represent New Zealand in 1947 and 1948. Experienced Ponsonby players Brian Riley and Arthur Kay were selected in the five eighths positions while Hawea Mataira was chosen in the forwards. The South Auckland side however ran out easy 21–9 winners after a "high-class exhibition of the code to a large crowd". Their passing movements were particularly impressive.

9 October	Auckland	9-21	South Auckland	Carlaw Park 1
3:00	Try: Ray Halsey; Con: Warwick Clarke; Pen: Warwick Clarke 2		Try: R Davies, Sanson, Owen Brooks, L Allen, R Taylor; Con: Owen Brooks 2 Pen: Owen Brooks	Referee: G Kelly

=== Auckland matches played and scorers ===
No	Name	Club Team	Play	Tries	Con	Pen	Points
1	Warwick Clarke	City	2	0	3	3	12
2	Ray Halsey	Otahuhu	2	2	0	0	6
3	Jock Rutherford	North Shore	2	1	0	0	3
4	Don McLeod	Marist	2	0	0	0	0
4	Norm Johnson	Otahuhu	2	0	0	0	0
4	Maurice Costello	Marist	1	0	0	0	0
4	Ivan Gregory	Newton	1	0	0	0	0
4	Alan Donovan	City	1	0	0	0	0
4	Dave McWilliams	Marist	1	0	0	0	0
4	S Rangi	Newton	1	0	0	0	0
4	Horace Hunt	North Shore	1	0	0	0	0
4	Thomas Field	North Shore	1	0	0	0	0
4	Eugene Donovan	City	1	0	0	0	0
4	Ron McGregor	Richmond	1	0	0	0	0
4	Bernie Lowther	Richmond	1	0	0	0	0
4	Arthur Kay	Ponsonby	1	0	0	0	0
4	Brian Riley	Ponsonby	1	0	0	0	0
4	C Williams	Richmond	1	0	0	0	0
4	Dick (R.R.) Hull	Ponsonby	1	0	0	0	0
4	Leo Davis	Richmond	1	0	0	0	0
4	Hawea Mataira	City	1	0	0	0	0

=== Auckland Pākehā matches played and scorers ===
No	Name	Club Team	Play	Tries	Con	Pen	Points
1	Warwick Clarke	City	1	0	1	1	4
2	William Kinney	Richmond	1	1	0	0	3
2	Don McLeod	Marist	1	1	0	0	3
2	Thomas Fields	North Shore	1	1	0	0	3
5	Ron McGregor	Richmond	1	0	0	0	0
5	Bernie Lowther	Richmond	1	0	0	0	0
5	Reginald Harkins	Richmond	1	0	0	0	0
5	Maurice Costello	Marist	1	0	0	0	0
5	John Rutherford	North Shore	1	0	0	0	0
5	Dick (R.R.) Hull	Ponsonby	1	0	0	0	0
5	Leo Davis	Richmond	1	0	0	0	0
5	Les Clement	Mt Albert	1	0	0	0	0
5	Norm Johnson	Otahuhu	1	0	0	0	0

=== Auckland Māori (Tāmaki) matches played and scorers ===
Oswald Martin came on as an injury replacement for Jack Hemi in the first half.

No	Name	Club Team	Play	Tries	Con	Pen	DG	Points
1	A Taumata	Manukau	1	1	0	0	0	3
1	Joe Murray	Manukau	1	1	0	0	0	3
1	Aubrey Thompson	Manukau	1	1	0	0	0	3
4	Jack Hemi	Manukau	1	0	1	0	0	2
4	Ralph Martin	Manukau	1	0	0	0	1	2
6	Ivan Gregory	Newton	1	0	0	0	0	0
6	Tom Butler	Manukau	1	0	0	0	0	0
6	S Rangi	Newton	1	0	0	0	0	0
6	T Kipa	Marist	1	0	0	0	0	0
6	Hawea Mataira	City	1	0	0	0	0	0
6	A Rogers	Ponsonby	1	0	0	0	0	0
6	George Shilton	Manukau	1	0	0	0	0	0
6	Wiremu Te Tai	Manukau	1	0	0	0	0	0
6	Oswald Martin	Manukau	1	0	0	0	0	0

=== Junior matches ===
Date		Score		Score	Referee	Venue
7 August	Auckland Juniors	14	South Auckland Juniors	3	A Siddle	Carlaw Park 1, 1:30

== Annual General Meetings and Club News ==
=== ARL Junior Control Board ===
They held their annual meeting in the League Rooms, Courthouse Lane on Tuesday, March 30 at 8pm. The junior control board advised in mid April that the following officers were elected:- chairman, Mr. E. Chapman; deputy-chairman, Mr. C. Howe; secretary, Mr. W.F. Clarke; assistant secretary and grounds allocator, Mr. G. Stonex. The board expressed their frustration at their meeting in mid May that clubs were granting transfers to junior players without the consent of the board. Chairman Mr. E. Chapman “cited several cases of flagrant defiance of the conditions” and “complaints were referred to the clubs concerned”.

=== ARL Referees Association ===
The held their Annual Meeting in the A.R.L Board Rooms in Grey's Buildings on Monday, March 8 at 8pm. Their honorary secretary was Thomas E. Skinner.

=== Avondale League Football Club ===
Avondale held their annual meeting on Tuesday, April 6 at 8pm in the Labour Party's Room at St. George's Road in Avondale. All coaches and intending players were asked to attend. Their honorary secretary was H.W. Green. On July 9 the Avondale club published a memorial for Norm York, their clubmate who had died on July 8, 1940.

=== City Rovers ===
City Rovers held a practice at Carlaw Park on Saturday in early April at 2:30 and on each Tuesday and Thursday evening thereafter from 5 to 7pm. Their secretary was Ernie Asher. At the June 2 meeting of the ARL a request was made by the City Rovers club to play a game in Wellington in the second round of the competition when they had a bye. A decision was deferred. At the June 9 meeting they were granted permission to play a match in Wellington when they had their bye.

=== Ellerslie United League Football Club ===
Ellerslie held their annual general meeting at the Parish Hall in Ellerslie on March 22 at 8pm. Their honorary secretary was Mr. G. Whaley. They held a practice for all grades at Ellerslie School Ground on Saturday, April 3 at 2.30pm. A further practice was advertised for Saturday, April 17 at Ellerslie Reserve at 2.30pm for all grades with instructions for all players to meet at the League Rooms the night before to weigh in.

=== Green Lane Rugby League Club ===
Green Lane held their annual meeting in the Old Fire Station on Green Lane Road, on Monday, April 5 at 8pm. Their honorary secretary was W. Cheesman.

=== Glenora Rugby League Football Club ===
Glenora lost two of their best junior players to Mt Albert at the start of the season, G.E. Balcombe (forward) and A. Jones (second five).

=== Manukau Rugby League Football Club ===
on October 9 the Manukau side travelled to Taihape to play the Taihape Māori side. The local team was composed of rugby players and after the match the rugby union banned them from the game for playing a rugby league match.

=== Marist Brothers Old Boys League Football Club ===
MaristOld Boys held their annual meeting at the rugby league rooms on Courthouse Lane on Thursday, 25 March at 7.45pm. Jack Kirwan was their honorary secretary. They held a meeting at the Courthouse Lane ARL Rooms on Friday, March 26 for all junior and schoolboy players.

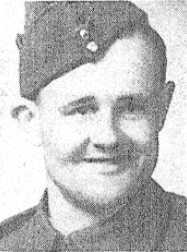
Charles Henry Patrick Malone

Lance Corporal Charles Henry Patrick Malone died on March 24, 1943, from his wounds. He was the only son of Mr. Charles Daniel Malone, and Mrs. Lilian Evelyn Malone who lived on New North Road in Kingsland. He was 26 years of age and had been educated at Marist Brothers’ School and the Seddon Memorial Technical College. He played rugby league for the Marist club and was also noted as a “keen sportsman”. He left New Zealand with the First Echalon and was part of the 24 Infantry Battalion. Malone was taken prisoner at Bardia while he was attending to wounded soldiers. He was later rescued by the British, but was wounded during action on Ruwersat Ridge. He recovered but after being posted with his unit again was wounded once more on an allied push in Tunisia, North Africa. He was buried at Sfax War Cemetery, Tunisia. He is memorialised at the Auckland War Memorial Museum, in the World War 2 Hall of Memories.

=== Mt. Albert United Rugby League Football Club ===
Mt Albert held their Annual General Meeting at their club headquarters at Fowld's Park in Morningside on Monday, March 15. Their honorary secretary was F.W. Clements. They advertised a practice at Fowlds Park in Morningside for Saturday, March 20 at 2pm. Their honorary secretary was F.W. Clements. On August 28 Mt Albert held a “Welcome Home Dance” for their “returned boys on furlough from the Middle East” at 8pm at the St George's Hall in Kingsland. And advertisement was placed by Mrs. H. Wood, the secretary of the Ladies Social Committee.

=== Newton Rangers Football Club ===
Newton Rangers held their annual meeting on March 22 with Mr. M.J. Hooper presiding. The following officers were elected:- Patron, Mr. Hooper; patroness, Mrs. J.A. Lee; vice patron, Mr. A. Blakey; president, Hon. W.E. Parry; hon. secretary, Mr. W. Treston; club captain, J. Ginders; schools’ board delegate, Mr. M. McKay; coach, Mr. Roy Hardgrave; committee, Messrs. Dyer, Dunn, B. Zimmerman, Hardgrave, Moyle, Fred Zimmerman, Everitt, and Laurensen. They held practises at Carlaw Park on Saturday, March 27, at 2pm for all grades. Their honorary secretary was Mr. J.A. Mackinnon.

=== North Shore Albions ===
Henry Raymond ‘Harry’ Zane-Zaninovich was killed in action in the Western Desert, Middle East on January 17, 1943. He played senior league for North Shore and also Manukau. He was 23 years of age. North Shore Albions held their annual meeting in their football shed on Vauxhill Road on Monday, March 29 at 8pm. Their honorary secretary was M.W. Coghlan.

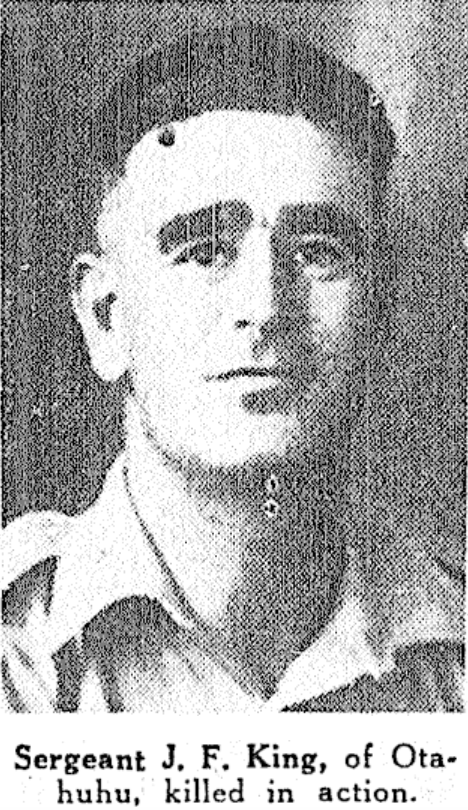

Former North Shore player John Fraser King was killed in action in Tunisia on March 26, 1943. He was married to Dorothy Beatrice King and living on Tahatai Street in Otahuhu at the time of his departure for war. He was the second son of Mr. John Brownlow King and Mrs. Isobel Blackeston King of Devonport. King had left for the war with the Third Echelon and was part of the 24 Infantry Battalion. He had previously served in World War I and was a sergeant in WW2. King was buried at the Sfax War Cemetery, Tunisia. He is memorialised on Devonport Memorial Drive, Auckland, and at the Auckland War Memorial Museum in the World War 2 Hall of Memories.

On Saturday, August 7 Jack Campbell, the former New Zealand representative and North Shore player was wed to Wilma Stirling. Campbell was home from the war on furlough. Stirling was the sister of Ivor Stirling, another New Zealand league representative, while she was a junior high school swimming champion at Whangarei High School, while her sister, Dulcie, was a New Zealand Hockey representative. Their niece, Glenda Stirling would go on to represent New Zealand at swimming in the 1968 Olympic Games and their nephew Ken Stirling also represented New Zealand at rugby league.

=== Papakura Rugby League Football Club ===
In late May Mr. S. Heron, who was secretary of the Papakura Amateur Athletic Club and speaking on behalf of the Papakura Rugby League Club asked the Papakura Borough Council if they would receive a “deputation of both clubs for the purpose of discussing matters relative to Prince Edward Park. The council agreed to receive the deputation. In late June the Amateur Athletic Club and Papakura Rugby League Club sent a delegation to the Papakura Borough Council meeting to request a lease of Prince Edward Park of 5 years. There were “various speakers [who] pointed out that they had considerable money available to spend on buildings and laying out work, but required some security of tenure before spending any money on many needed improvements that were necessary for the successful running of the sports of the two clubs”. Mayor Mr. S Evans spoke on the fairness to ratepayers of having two clubs having full power over the park and that the council should be represented on the committee of control. The deputation was then promised that the matter would come before the Domain Board for discussion before any decisions were reached. On August 7 Len Cooke broke his jaw in a match after receiving a kick in the face. He was taken to Auckland Hospital for treatment before returning home. It was said that he was one of the clubs best players and had kicked many goals for his side.

=== Point Chevalier League Football Club ===
Point Chevalier held practice for all grades at Walker Park on Saturday, April 3 at 2pm. Their honorary secretary was Mr. A.G. Daniels. In August the honorary secretary, A. G. Daniels thanked those who donated at the benefit dance for the club.

=== Ponsonby United Football Club ===
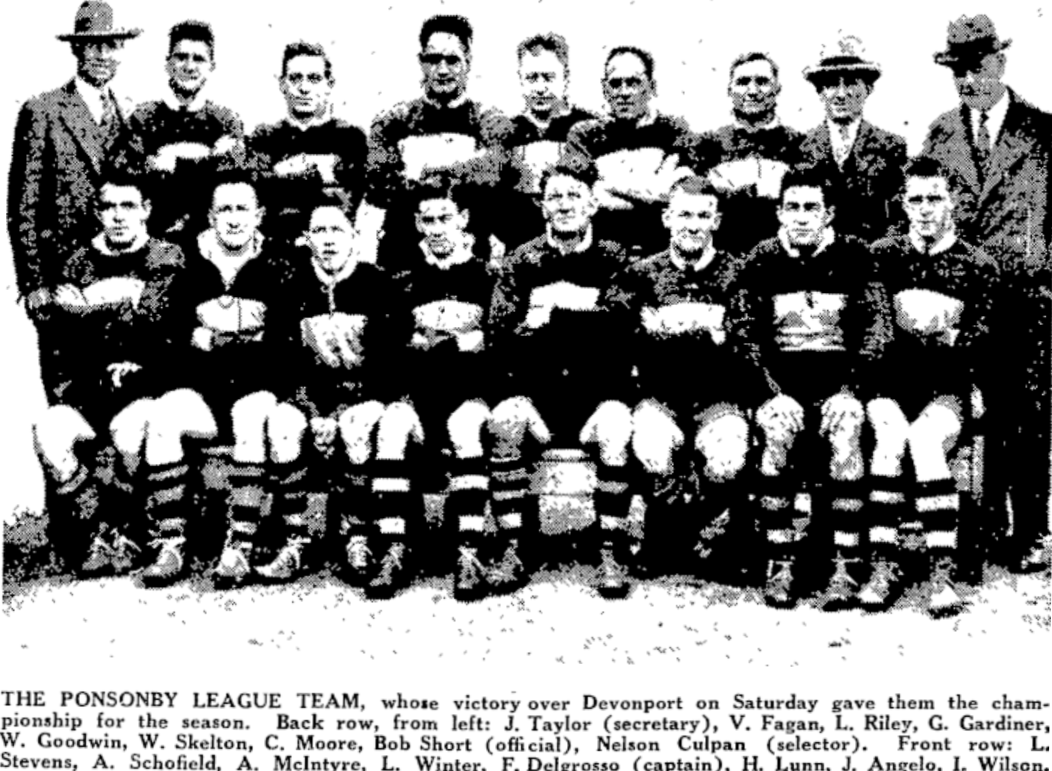
Walter Goodwin pictured in the champion Ponsonby side of 1930.

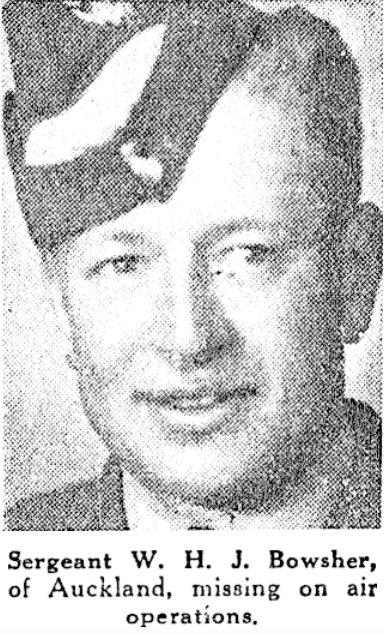

Gunner, Walter Goodwin was killed in action on June 18, 1942, however his death was not reported in the newspapers until January 1943. He was a prominent member of the Ponsonby club and played for the senior side in the early 1930s including the side which won the championship in 1930. Ponsonby held a committee meeting on Monday, March 1 and their Annual Meeting on Monday, March 8 at 7pm at the Leys Institute. Ponsonby held practises for all grades at Carlaw Park on Tuesday's and Thursday's at 5pm and also on Saturday afternoons prior to the commencement of the season. On April 7 Ponsonby made an application to play a game against a South Auckland (upper Waikato) club on Easter Saturday. However a decision was deferred as it was not known if club matches would be taking place on that date. In September former player Flight Sergeant William Henry John (Bill) Bowsher was reported missing on operations in the war. He was educated at Auckland Grammar School and left New Zealand for Canada in January 1941 where he trained at the RCAF, 3 Wireless School in Winnipeg, Manitoba, and then at the RCAF, 6 Bombing and Gunnery School, Mountain View, Ontario. It was later confirmed that he had been killed in action during air operations in the Mediterranean on August 5, 1943. He was survived by his parents, Henry Thomas Bowsher, and Nora Bowsher. He was memorialised at the Malta Memorial in Malta, the Auckland War Memorial Museum in the World War 2 Hall of Memories, and Auckland Grammar School War Memorial.

=== Richmond Rovers Football Club ===
Richmond held their annual meeting at the club rooms at Grey Lynn Park on Wednesday, March 10 at 8pm. Their honorary secretary was W.R. Dick. Richmond held practice for all grades at Grey Lynn Park on Saturday, April 3 for all grades. The schoolboys at 1.30pm, juniors at 2pm, and seniors at 3pm. Their honorary secretary was W.R. Dick.
