= Jack Hemi =

New Zealand international dual code rugby player

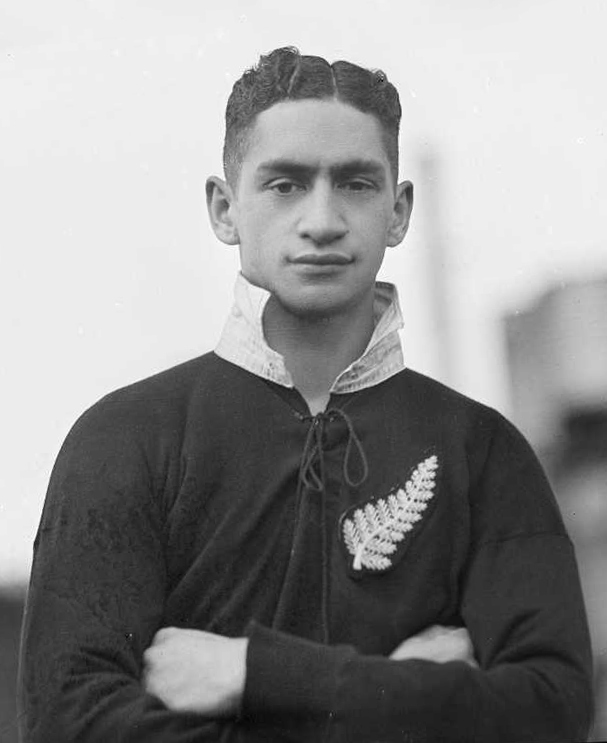
- Hemi in 1935

Personal information
- Full name: Jack Raharuhi Hemi
- Born: 23 August 1914 Te Whiti-o-Tutāwake, Wairarapa, New Zealand
- Died: 1 June 1996 (aged 81) Carterton, New Zealand

Playing information
- Height: 5 ft 11 in (1.80 m)
- Weight: 13 st (83 kg)

Rugby union
- Position: Fullback, Centre
Club
Years	Team	Pld	T	G	FG	P
1933	Gladstone	1	0	2	0	5
1933–34	Featherston	11	5	11	1	48
1935–36	Gladstone	9	4	21	0	56
1936	Masterton (guest)	1	0	0	0	0
	Total	22	9	34	1	109
Representative
Years	Team	Pld	T	G	FG	P
1933–1934	Wairarapa	14	2	30	0	77
1934	Wairarapa Trials	2	1	2	0	7
1934–35	New Zealand Māori	14	3	35	0	88
1935	North Māori	1	0	3	0	6
1935	Wellington-Wairarapa	1	0	5	1	15

Rugby league
- Position: Fullback, Stand-off, Wing
Club
Years	Team	Pld	T	G	FG	P
1936–43	Manukau	108	36	300	8	724
1944	Hokowhitu	2	0	5	0	10
1945–1947	Randwick	14	0	11	0	22
	Total	124	36	316	8	756
Representative
Years	Team	Pld	T	G	FG	P
1936	Auckland A	1	0	0	0	0
1936–43	Auckland Māori (Tamaki)	12	5	24	0	63
1936–39	New Zealand	10 (1)	1	42	0	87
1937–1946	New Zealand Māori	2	0	1	0	2
1938–41	Auckland	2	0	5	0	10
1945–47	Wellington	5	0	5	1	12

Jack Raharuhi Hemi (23 August 1914 – 1 June 1996) was a New Zealand rugby union and league player. He was born in Te Poho-o-Tutawake, Wairarapa, New Zealand on 23 August 1914.

== Early years ==
Jack Hemi was the oldest son of Hineipikitia-ki-te-rangi (Piki) Reiri, of Te Whiti, and her husband, Paraikete (Blanket) Hēmi. There were thirteen children in the family. Hemi attended Te Whiti School. He worked at a freezing works and, when his father died in 1936, Hemi assumed responsibility for his mother and four siblings. Of Māori descent, he identified with the Ngāti Kahungunu and Rangitane iwi.

== Rugby union career ==
Hemi played rugby union for the Gladstone club before moving to the Featherston club and first represented Wairarapa in 1933, aged only 18. He played for New Zealand Māori in 1934 and toured Australia with the team in 1935. He was also an All Blacks trialist in 1935.

== Rugby league career ==
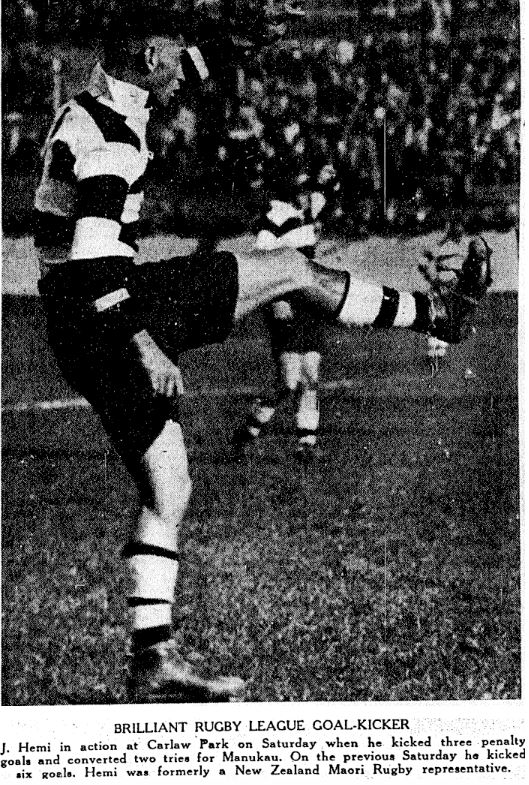

In 1936 Hemi switched codes, joining the new Manukau rugby league club in the Auckland Rugby League competition. He represented New Zealand that year against Great Britain and also played for Auckland. He represented New Zealand Māori in 1937, being part of the team that defeated Australia 16–5 at Carlaw Park.

He toured Australia in 1938, slotting a goal against Queensland from 17 yards behind the halfway line. Hemi toured Great Britain in 1939, but World War II ended the tour without a test match being played. Exempt from War duty Hemi continued to play for Manukau. In 1941 he scored 206 points for Manukau in all competition matches which was comfortably a record in Auckland Rugby League senior football to that point. He scored 12 tries, and kicked 59 conversions along with 26 penalties during the season.

In 1945 he represented Wellington alongside his younger brother, Lou.
