= Hawea Mataira =

NZ dual-code rugby international footballer

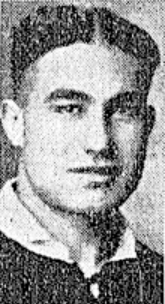

Personal information
- Full name: Hawea Karepa Mataira
- Born: 3 December 1910 Nūhaka, New Zealand
- Died: 15 November 1979 (aged 68) Wairoa, New Zealand

Playing information
- Height: 1.8 m (5 ft 11 in)
- Weight: 92 kg (14 st 7 lb)

Rugby union
- Position: Loose forward
Club
Years	Team	Pld	T	G	FG	P
1932–36	Hawke's Bay	35
Representative
Years	Team	Pld	T	G	FG	P
	New Zealand Māori
1934	New Zealand	1	0	0	0	0

Rugby league
- Position: Prop
Club
Years	Team	Pld	T	G	FG	P
1937–41	City Rovers	61	9	0	0	27
1942	City-Ōtāhuhu	11	3	0	0	9
1943–44	City Rovers	37	8	0	0	24
	Total	109	20	0	0	60
Representative
Years	Team	Pld	T	G	FG	P
1937–44	Auckland Māori (Tamaki)	10	0	0	0	0
1939	New Zealand	1	0	0	0	0
1941–43	Auckland	3	2	0	0	6
- Source: Scrum.com

Hawea Karepa Mataira (3 December 1910 – 15 November 1979) was a dual-code rugby football player who represented New Zealand in both rugby union and rugby league.

== Rugby union career ==
Mataira made his first class debut in 1931 and in 1932 made his debut for Hawke's Bay. He went on to play 35 first class matches for Hawke's Bay between 1932 and 1936.

In 1934 he made his All Blacks debut on a tour of Australia. The next year he was a surprise omission from the 1935–36 tour of Great Britain. Mataira also represented New Zealand Māori.

In 1936 Mataira became involved in a dispute with a teammate over a jersey. His teammate, Bernard Edward Rogers was knocked down during the fight and suffered a fractured skull after striking his head as he fell. He died from his injuries. Mataira was charged with manslaughter but was acquitted after it was found that Rogers had been the aggressor and Mataira had tried hard to avoid coming to blows.

== Rugby league career ==
Mataira switched codes in 1937, moving to Auckland and joining the City Rovers club in the Auckland Rugby League competition. Mataira later joined the Manukau club. He was selected for the New Zealand national rugby league team 1939 tour of Great Britain and France but the tour was cancelled before any Test matches were played due to the outbreak of World War II.

After the War, Mataira represented New Zealand Māori against several touring sides.
