= Johnny Simpson =

NZ international rugby union & league player (1922–2010)

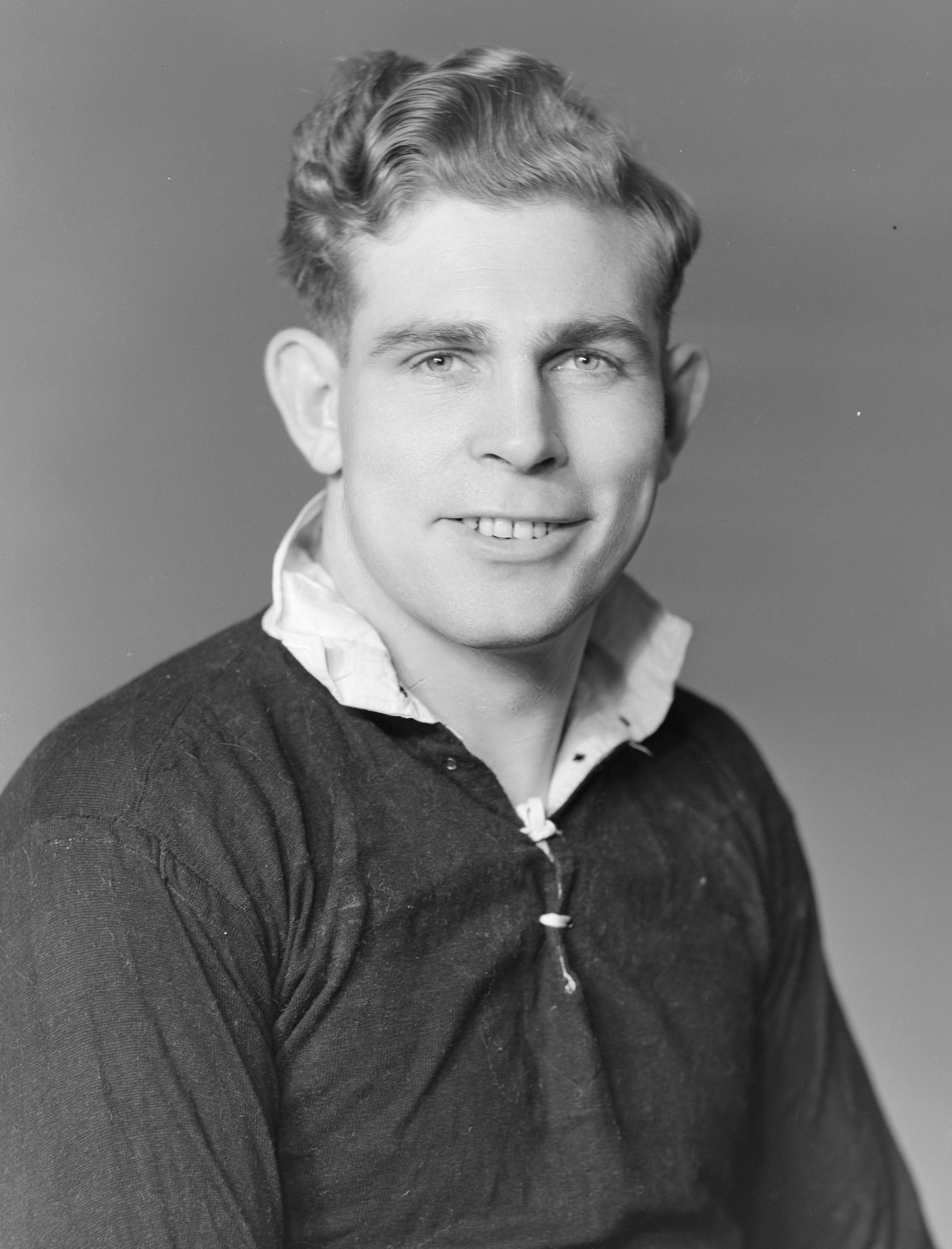
- Simpson in 1949
- Born: John George Simpson; 18 March 1922 Rotorua, New Zealand
- Died: 17 November 2010 (aged 88) Wellington, New Zealand
- Height: 1.83 m (6 ft 0 in)
- Weight: 95 kg (14 st 13 lb)

Rugby union career
- Position: Prop
International career
Years	Team	Apps	(Points)
1947–1950	New Zealand	30	(6)

John George "Johnny" Simpson (18 March 1922 – 17 November 2010) was a New Zealand rugby union player. During his career he played as a prop.

Simpson started his footballing career playing rugby league for the Marist club in the Auckland Rugby League competition.
