= Charles Finlayson (New Zealand athlete) =

New Zealand sportsman

Personal information
- Full name: Charles Gordon Finlayson
- Born: 9 August 1889 Napier, Hawke's Bay, New Zealand
- Died: 9 July 1943 (aged 53) Ōtāhuhu, Auckland, New Zealand

Playing information
- Position: Fullback
Club
| Years | Team | Pld | T | G | FG | P |
|---|---|---|---|---|---|---|
| 1912–14 | Petone | 16 | 6 | 2 | 0 | 22 |
| 1915 | Hutt | 4 | 1 | 3 | 0 | 9 |
| | Total | 20 | 7 | 5 | 0 | 31 |
Representative
| Years | Team | Pld | T | G | FG | P |
| 1912–13 | Wellington | 3 | 1 | 0 | 0 | 3 |
| 1913–15 | Wellington Trials | 5 |
| 1913 | New Zealand | 1 | 0 | 0 | 0 | 0 |
| 1915 | Hutt Valley | 2 | 1 | 0 | 0 | 3 |
- Cricket career

Personal information
- Nickname: Ranji
- Batting: Left-handed
- Bowling: Left-arm medium

Domestic team information
- Years: Team
- 1909/10–1920/21: Wellington
- 1929/30–1930/31: Auckland

Career statistics
| Competition | First-class |
|---|---|
| Matches | 7 |
| Runs scored | 225 |
| Batting average | 18.75 |
| 100s/50s | 0/1 |
| Top score | 51 |
| Balls bowled | 746 |
| Wickets | 9 |
| Bowling average | 43.11 |
| 5 wickets in innings | 0 |
| 10 wickets in match | 0 |
| Best bowling | 4/121 |
| Catches/stumpings | 2/– |
- Source: CricketArchive, 5 November 2022

Charles Gordon Finlayson (9 August 1889 – 9 July 1943) was a New Zealand sportsman who represented New Zealand at both rugby league and cricket.

== Rugby league career ==
Finlayson was a Fullback and represented Wellington in 1912 and 1913. He was selected for the New Zealand side for the second match against New South Wales in 1913, becoming Kiwi number 100. The New Zealanders lost 58-19 and Finlayson, along with the other two debutants in the match, never played for NZ again after the loss. Finlayson was injured during the match and left the field early in the second half. He joined the newly formed Petone club in 1912 after switching from rugby union. In 1914 he joined the Hutt club but only played 4 matches for them before the team withdrew from the competition due to the enlistment of many players in the war effort. He also played 2 matches for a Hutt Valley team against Wellington City sides. His son, Kenneth Finlayson played rugby league for the Otahuhu Rovers club in Auckland, after the family had moved there, in their senior sides from 1934 to 1943. He played in the Fox Memorial first grade side from 1941 to 1943 when the club was first promoted to it. He was a well regarded hooker and transferred to the Manukau club for the 1944 season and played 18 games in their first grade side.

== Cricket career ==
Finlayson made his debut for Wellington on 26 March 1910 against Hawke's Bay. He went on to play three other first class matches for Wellington, including one against Australia in 1921. On 24 March 1928 Finlayson played for New Zealand against Australia at Eden Park. Because New Zealand did not have Test status at the time the three-day match only has first-class status. Finlayson later played two first class games for Auckland, once against the touring Marylebone Cricket Club and once against Wellington in a 1931 Plunket Shield match.

He was employed by the railways in New Zealand. Although he was prominent in Wellington club cricket he played no representative cricket for Wellington after 1921, maintaining that as players were unpaid, he could not afford the time off work. He was selected for New Zealand in 1927-28 purely on the basis of his club form for Petone, having taken in that season 63 wickets at an average of 10.4 and attained a batting average of 51.75.

== Personal life ==
He and his wife Olive had five sons, two of whom predeceased him.
