= 1939 New Zealand rugby league tour of Great Britain and France =

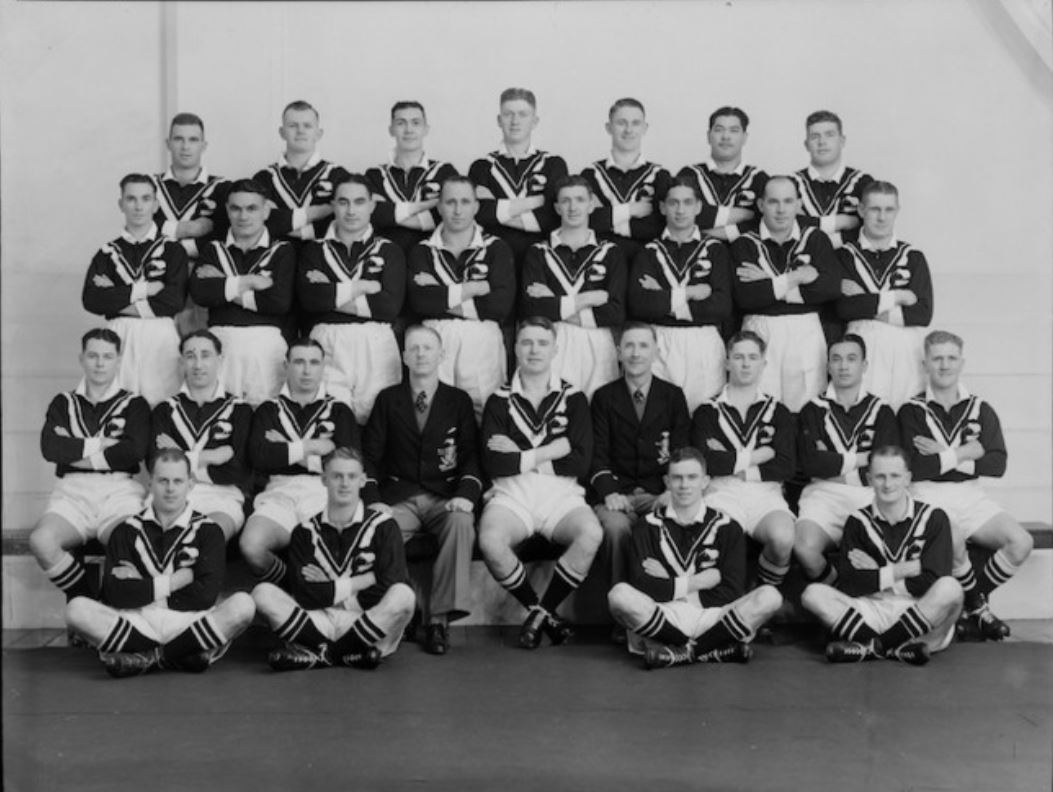
The touring team photographed while en-route to the United Kingdom

The 1939 New Zealand rugby league tour of Great Britain and France was a scheduled tour by the New Zealand national rugby league team of Europe between September and December 1939. After arriving in the United Kingdom in August 1939, the tour was abandoned after one match had been played due to the outbreak of the Second World War.

== Invitation ==
In October 1938 the British Rugby Football League (RFL) invited the New Zealand Rugby League to send a team to tour Britain during the latter part of 1939. The RFL also suggested that the side visit France as well and offered to help with arrangements for the French leg. At a special meeting of the New Zealand League Council in November 1938 both offers were accepted.

== Squad ==
After trial games a squad of 26 players (14 backs and 12 forwards) was finalised on 13 July 1939.

Backs
Name	Region	Age
Fullbacks
Jack Hemi	Auckland	23
Jack Smith	Auckland	21
Threequarters
Wings
Jack Campbell	Canterbury	22
Arthur McInnarney	Auckland	21
Ces Davison	Canterbury	29
Laurie Mills	Auckland	21
Centres
Verdun Scott	Auckland	22
Tom Chase	Auckland	26
Arthur Kay	Auckland	24
Wally Tittleton	Auckland	25
Halves
Stand-offs
Bob Banham	Auckland	24
Dave Solomon	Auckland	26
Halfbacks
Ivor Stirling	Auckland	23
Len Brown	Canterbury	25

Forwards
Name	Region	Age
Hookers
George Orman	West Coast	27
Bert Leatherbarrow	Auckland	29
Props, Second-rows and Locks
George Mitchell	Auckland	24
Ross Jones	Auckland	21
Joe Cootes	Wellington	25
Hawea Mataira	Auckland	28
John Clark	Canterbury	27
George Bellaney	Canterbury	29
George Beadle	Waikato	25
Pita Ririnui	Auckland	23
Rex King	Canterbury	28
Harold Milliken	Auckland	25

J.A. Redwood (chairman of the New Zealand Rugby League) and G. Grey Campbell (chairman of the Auckland Rugby League) were named as the co-managers of the team but Grey Campbell later withdrew due to ill-health and was replaced by R. Doble, also of the Auckland Rugby League. Canterbury forward Rex King was named captain of the team.

== Tour ==
The squad sailed from Wellington on 27 July 1939 onboard the RMS Rangitiki and arrived in London on 29 August 1939. Arriving at the Beechwood Hotel, Harrogate – the squad's base for the tour – on 31 August the team tried to maintain a normal attitude even in the face of the deteriorating political situation around them but acknowledged that the situation was liable to change at any time and in an interview, Doble volunteered the services of the team to help with air raid precautions in the Harrogate area. The first game of the tour took place as planned on 2 September as the tourists beat St Helens 19–3 in front of a crowd of 5,000 at Knowsley Road, but the declaration of war by Britain against Germany the following morning meant a review of the tour's viability.

An emergency meeting of the RFL tour sub-committee attended by the New Zealand managers on 5 September concluded that no further matches were possible and "the only course was to endeavour to arrange for the return of the party to New Zealand at the earliest possible moment". With the tour officially abandoned the remaining fixtures were all cancelled but while awaiting a ship home permission was given for the game against Dewsbury to take place on 9 September. Despite being announced at short notice the game was watched by 6,200 and the tourists won 22–10 to end the tour with a 100% winning record. Through the intervention of the New Zealand High Commissioner in London, Bill Jordan, the team were able to return to New Zealand on-board the Rangitiki – the same ship they had arrived on and arrived back in Auckland in late October.

The New Zealand Rugby League established that the curtailment of the tour had led to a net loss of £3,827 to the League.

== Schedule ==
The schedule of games in Britain was agreed in June 1939 and the French fixtures were to be arranged while the British part of the tour was in progress. Had the tour continued there would have been 21 games against English club sides, representative matches against Yorkshire, Lancashire and Cumberland, a test match against Wales and a three-test series against Great Britain. (Note: At this time the Great Britain side were universally referred to as England by both the rugby league authorities and the press.)

Date	Opponents	Venue
2 September	St Helens	Knowsley Road
7 September	Hull Kingston Rovers	Old Craven Park
9 September	Dewsbury	Crown Flatt
13 September	Barrow	Craven Park
16 September	Warrington	Wilderspool
18 September	Yorkshire	Odsal, Bradford
23 September	Halifax	Thrum Hall
25 September	Widnes	Naughton Park
30 September	Great Britain	Station Road, Swinton
4 October	Hunslet	Parkside
7 October	Oldham	Watersheddings
11 October	Lancashire	Wilderspool, Warrington
14 October	Cumberland	Workington
18 October	Huddersfield	Fartown
21 October	Hull F.C.	The Boulevard
25 October	York	Clarence Street
28 October	Wigan	Central Park
1 November	Castleford	Wheldon Road
4 November	Swinton	Station Road
11 November	Great Britain	Headingley, Leeds
15 November	Broughton Rangers	Belle Vue
18 November	Wales	Stebonheath Park
22 November	Bramley	Barley Mow
25 November	Bradford Northern	Odsal
2 December	Wakefield Trinity	Belle Vue
6 December	Leeds	Headingley
9 December	Salford	The Willows
16 December	Great Britain	Odsal, Bradford

=== Results ===
2 September 1939
3:30 pm BST (UTC+01:00)

St Helens	3–19	New Zealand
Tries: Balmer		Tries: King, Banham, Jones; Goals: Hemi (5)

Knowsley Road
Attendance: 5,000
Referee: Frank Peel

Team details
St Helens		Position	New Zealand
Name	Number	Position	Number	Name
Jimmy Pendlebury	1	FB	1	Jack Hemi
Stanley Powell	2	WG	2	Jack Campbell
Jack Waring	3	CE	3	Wally Tittleton
Frank Balmer	4	CE	4	Bob Banham
Harry Pimblett	5	WG	5	Laurie Mills
Jack Bradbury	6	SO	6	Dave Solomon
Harold Briscoe	7	SH	7	Ivor Sterling
George Davies	8	PR	8	Harold Milliken
Peter Smith	9	HK	9	George Orman
Bob Grundy	10	PF	10	John Clark
Bill Fishwick	11	SR	11	Pita Ririnui
Jack Fearnley	12	SR	12	Ross Jones
Peter Twist	13	LF	13	Rex King

9 September 1939
3:30 pm BST (UTC+01:00)

Dewsbury	10–22	New Zealand
Tries: Seeling, Wood; Goals: Germaine (2)		Tries: Solomon, Beadle, Kay, Leatherbarrow; Goals: Hemi (5)

Crown Flatt
Attendance: 5,000
Referee: Albert Dobson

Team details
Dewsbury		Position	New Zealand
Name	Number	Position	Number	Name
Ernest Higgins	1	FB	1	Jack Hemi
Billy Wood	2	WG	2	Jack Smith
Harry Germaine	3	CE	3	Arthur Kay
Norman Hunter	4	CE	4	Bob Banham
Arthur Veysey	5	WG	5	Thomas Chase
Harry Royal	6	SO	6	Dave Solomon
Ken Nicholson	7	SH	7	Len Brown
Harry Hammond	8	PR	8	George Bellaney
Tommy Lawton	9	HK	9	Bert Leatherbarrow
Bryan Langford	10	PF	10	George Beadle
Horace Randolph	11	SR	11	Harold Milliken
George Kershaw	12	SR	12	Hawea Mataira
Charlie Seeling	13	LF	13	Ross Jones
