= Pita Ririnui =

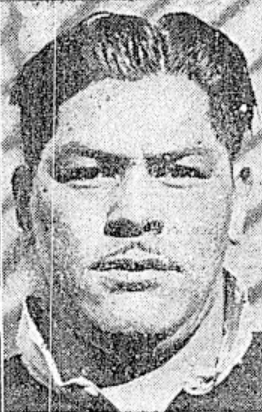

Personal information
- Full name: Riwaru Peter Ririnui
- Born: 10 October, 1912 Tauranga, Bay of Plenty, New Zealand
- Died: 14 June, 1998 New Zealand

Playing information
- Height: 6 ft (183 cm)
- Weight: 15 st 7 lb (217 lb; 98 kg)

Rugby union
- Position: Lock, Five-eighth
Club
Years	Team	Pld	T	G	FG	P
1930–31	Huimai	14	1	0	0	3
1932–37	Rangataua	47	5	0	0	15
	Total	61	6	0	0	18
Representative
Years	Team	Pld	T	G	FG	P
1930–34	Tauranga Trials	4	0	0	0	0
1930–37	Tauranga	46	2	0	0	6
1930–37	Ngāi Te Rangi (Tauranga Māori)	12	0	0	0	0
1933	Bay of Plenty Māori	1	0	0	0	0
1935–37	Bay of Plenty	8	0	0	0	0
1936	Tairawhiti Māori	1	0	0	0	0
1937	Poverty Bay-East Coast-Bay of Plenty combined	1	0	0	0	0

Rugby league
- Position: Second-row, Prop
Club
Years	Team	Pld	T	G	FG	P
1938–47	Manukau	135	26	0	0	78
Representative
Years	Team	Pld	T	G	FG	P
1938–45	Auckland Māori	12	4	0	0	12
1938–45	Auckland	4	1	0	0	3
1938–46	North Island	3	1	0	0	3
1939	New Zealand	1	0	0	0	0
1942	Auckland Māori XIII	1	0	0	0	0
1946	New Zealand Māori	1	0	0	0	0

Pita Ririnui played for the Manukau rugby league club in Auckland from 1938 to 1947 and represented Auckland from 1938 to 1945 as well as Auckland Māori from 1938 to 1945 and New Zealand Māori in 1947. He was also selected for New Zealand for the 1939 tour of England. Ririnui had previously played rugby union for the Huimai and Rangataua clubs in the Bay of Plenty as well as representative rugby union for the Tauranga sub-union representative side, Tauranga Māori, Bay of Plenty Māori, Tairawhiti Māori, and the Poverty Bay-East Coast-Bay of Plenty combined side against the touring South African side in 1937.

== Early life ==
Pita Ririnui was born in Tauranga on October 10, 1912. His parents were Moihi Moses Ririnui (1879-1951) and Purangi Te Keeti Ngawaka (1875-1970). He had nine siblings, they were: Te Ra Taratoa Ririnui (1908-1991), Rangiwhakairi Ririnui (1910-?), Hoete Mick Ririnui (1911-1949), Te Whetu Star Ririnui (1915-2004), Te Hirau Boy Ririnui (1917-1994), Rita Ririnui (1917-1980), Urupiki Mary Ririnui (1925-1988), Walter Te Rurku Ririnui (?-1946), and Haki Jack Ririnui (?-?).

== Playing career ==
=== Rugby union ===
==== 1930 Huimai, Tauranga, and Ngāi Te Rangi (Tauranga Maori) ====
Pita Ririnui began his rugby union senior grade career when he debuted for the Huimai senior side aged 17 on May 10, 1930. They were playing Cadets Old Boys in the Jordan Cup competition in Tauranga. He played in the second row, likely in a lock position in a 12–0 win. The following week he played in the same position against Athletics. Huimai won 14–6 with Ririnui scoring a try. It came when “several Huimai forwards charged through for Ririnui to score” which gave them an 11–0 lead. Soon after “short thrusts headed by Honiara, Keno, and P. Ririnui enabled Huimai to reach the south-eastern angle...”. His next game for Huimai was against Te Puna on May 24 at the High School Reserve in a 19–5 win.

Ririnui was then selected during the week in a Tauranga Trial match to help the selectors choose the team to play Thames on Kings Birthday. He was chosen in the second row of the Probables side with A Borell, Ike Tangitu, and R. Ngatai. His side won the match 14 to 13. Following the game he was named in the second row of the Tauranga side for the representative match alongside Honiana, C. Cameron, and N. Leslie. Tauranga won the match played in Thames by 16 points to 6. In comments on the game the Bay of Plenty Times wrote that Ririnui and Duke Ngatai “were in every forward movement, and fully earned their place”. He returned to his club side for a 10–6 loss to Cadets Old Boys on June 7 and at one stage “led a forward movement to the” centre of the field with Honiana.

Ririnui was selected for the Tauranga side again to play against Te Puke on June 14 for the Hurinui Apanui Shield. The match was played at Tauranga, with the visitors winning 6-3. During the first half “Ngatai, Leslie, and Ririnui forced their way through in the thick and the ball rolled across for Johnstone [Te Puke] to force”. Ririnui was back for Huimai against Athletics on June 21 in an 18–6 win. Late in the match Ririnui joined in a break which took them to the try line and from a scrum they kicked a drop goal to finish the scoring.

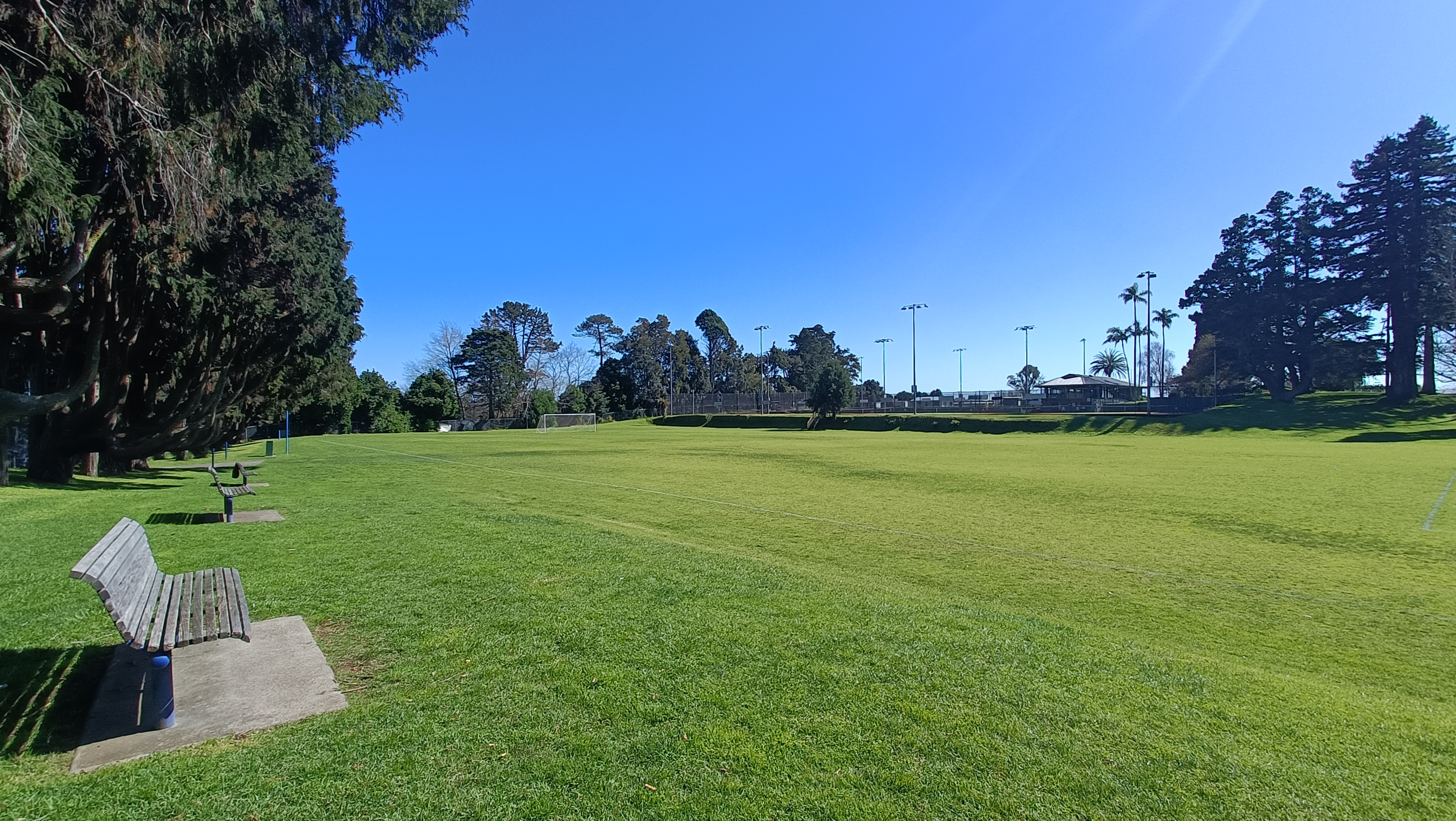
Present day Tauranga Domain.

He was selected once more for the Tauranga side to play against Rangitaiki on July 5 at Matata. Tauranga won 14–11 with the Bay of Plenty Times commenting that “in O. Broad, Ririnui, R. Ngatai, and W. Ngahoe we have four promising young forwards, and although not quite up to Shield forward knowledge and initiative it will not be long before they are”. Ririnui then played for Huimai in the final of the Jordan Cup which they won 11–5 against Cadets Old Boys on July 12 at the Tauranga Domain. It was their first ever season in the competition. Early in the game he was part of a group of players who “broke through in a dribbling movement...”, then some time later when Huimai was under pressure “the Huimai vanguard – led by Ngahoe and Ririnui – replied attractively” and took play to the other end. Early in the second half “Ririnui was conspicuous in the lineout work” then “smart work by Ririnui and J. Ngatai saw them” gain the advantage. Ririnui was involved in another forward passing movement and then near the end of the game a “combined effort” which nearly resulted in points.

During the week Ririnui was chosen in a ‘Native’ side to play the ‘Europeans’ at the Tauranga Domain on July 19. The Māori side was also named Ngāi Te Rangi (the local iwi) and they lost a close game 22-18. In the first half Ngahoe, Ririnui, and Nepia gained possession and reached the opposing try line but the ball was cleared. At halftime Ririnui was replaced as the selectors wanted to try out other players before selecting the Māori team to play Maniapoto for the Ratana Cup. Following the game he was named in the side for the July 24 match at Tauranga Domain. In a change of position thus far in his senior career he was named in the five eighths alongside B. Ngahoe. They lost 18 to 5 to Maniapoto-Tainui who were the holders of the Cup. Ririnui was at second five eighth.

In a Gilbey Cup game for Huimai against Athletics the following weekend “Ririnui broke away and was racing for the line when Wilkinson loomed up and checked the speedy forward”. Huimai won 14 to 3. Ririnui was selected for Tauranga to play Rangitaiki on August 9. The match finished 3–3 with Ririnui in the second row of the scrum. He was chosen in their next game against Whakatane on August 16 for the Hurinui Apanui Shield which Whakatane were the holders of. Once again Ririnui was in the second row and Tauranga won the shield with a 16–3 win. Ririnui was then selected in the Bay of Plenty 19 man representative squad to prepare for a game against Te Kuiti but ultimately did not make the final team. He was however chosen in the playing side for Tauranga's next match against Taupo on August 30 at Tauranga Domain. The match was a defence of the Te Hurinui Apanui Shield. Tauranga won 11-7 and during the first half “Ririnui pounced on top of him [a Taupo back] in a twinkling and sent the ball to Phelan to Tassell, who made a great sprint and was bordered out in the south-eastern angle”. A short time later “Ririnui, Haua and Tangitu broke away from the ruck...”. The following weekend Ririnui played for Tauranga once more in a game against Te Puke. The match was for the Parata Cup with Tauranga winning 11-3 and he was named to play in their following match against Rangitaiki on September 13. During the week on Wednesday though he played for Ngāi Te Rangi once more against Maniapoto in Tauranga. The match was for the Ratana Cup. Ririnui was in the second row for Ngāi Te Rangi (Tauranga Māori) who won 11-3. Then for Tauranga 3 days later he played in their 12–6 win over Rangitaiki. By winning they defended the Te Hurinui Apanui Shield. In the second half “Ririnui secured and brushed several men aside and cleared” when they had been under pressure.

Ririnui's final two games of his first season in senior rugby were for Tauranga against Taupo which they won 12 to 11 to retain the Parata Cup on September 20. While his final game was for Tauranga against Apanui for the Te Hurinui-Apanui Memorial Shield. Tauranga won 22-15, and during the first half “Heke made a rare opening and cut through and sent to Ririnui, who brushed past several opponents and sent the ball to Tangitu, who scored brilliantly”. Then in the second half “Mountfort, Leslie, and Ririnui led a bunched movement and made things very merry for the challengers...”. At the end of the season Ririnui was part of a complimentary dinner which was held for the Te Hurinui Apanui Shield holders team at the Masonic Hotel. He was also requested to be at Randell's for a team photo for his Huimai club side in mid October.

==== 1931 Huimai, Tauranga, and Tauranga Māori ====
Ririnui once again turned out for the Huimai club in Tauranga competition in 1931. He began the season playing in games for Huimai against Mount Maunganui on May 2, Te Puna on May 9, and Te Puna again on May 23. He was then selected to play for Tauranga Māori against Tauranga Pākehā on May 30. The match was to act as a trial for the Tauranga team to play Thames on King's Birthday. Ririnui played for Huimai in a 16–6 win over Mount Maunganui the following weekend. He played another club match on June 20 when they lost to Matakana. In a 13–8 loss to Cadets on June 27 a Ririnui scored a try but as there were several Ririnui's in the team it was unclear if it was Pita. After the match he was selected in a Tauranga trial match. In the meantime he played for Huimai v Athletic on July 4 in a 19–8 loss.

Ririnui was chosen in the Tauranga reserves for their match against Thames in July 11. He was named in the starting side for Tauranga against Te Puke the following weekend for the Parata Cup but ultimately did not play. He did however play on August 8 for Tauranga in their match with Te Puke. They lost the Parata Cup match 16–11 with Ririnui playing well in the second row. In the first half Ngahoe, Cameron, and Ririnui “dribbled into the twenty-five and hard forward play ensured...”. Then a while later Ririnui and Mansel “were conspicuous in a forward maneuver” that put pressure on Te Puke. Later in the half when they were defended Ririnui cleared the ball. And again he “kicked clear and followed up but Cleary saved brilliantly” for their opponents. In the second half Ririnui and Ngahoe combined splendidly and the home forwards delivered an attack in front of the visitors’ goal”. With the score 16–8 against them “Ririnui beat several opponents and crossed over, but could not touch down. Polley, however, was handy, and touched down” to narrow the score by 3. Following the game he was named to play once more for Tauranga in a August 15 match against Matamata. At Tauranga Domain, Matamata won 23 to 11. In the first half “the home forwards charged across, P. Ririnui and Mansel leading...”. Later when they were well behind Ririnui “made an opening and passed to Ainsley”, with a defender getting offside and Tauranga missing the penalty kick. Ririnui was named in a Tauranga trial match in the A Teams on September 5 in preparation for their final game of the season against Te Puke. Ririnui was selected in the side which was for the Te Hurinui Apanui Shield on September 12. Tauranga lost the match 8–6 with the only mention of Ririnui being that he won the ball from a lineout in the second half.

==== 1932 Rangataua Club, Tauranga, and Tauranga Māori ====
In 1932 Ririnui played club rugby for a newly former club named Rangataua. There was relatively little coverage of games in the Bay of Plenty Times newspaper during the season. He played in games against Athletics, Te Puna, and Cadets on April 30, May 7, and May 14. They won the match with Cadets 12 to 3, and then lost to Matakana on May 21 by 8 points to 5.

On May 28 the club competition took a break with a Tauranga trial match played. Ririnui played for the A Team which won 22-12. In the second half “Ririnui, Cameron, and Fitzpatrick headed a forward movement but Rayment stopped the advance”. He was then named in the Tauranga side to play Hamilton Old Boys club side. On June 4 Rangataua drew with Athletics 8-8 and it was reported that he was playing in the five eighths. A Ririnui scored the game tying try but there were 4 of them in the team, P. Ririnui, T. Ririnui, M. Ririnui, and W. Ririnui. During the following week it was reported that T Moiri and P Ririnui had been ordered to attend the next meeting of the management committee regarding the alleged assault of a referee in a game on April 26 which would have been at the very start of the season. Following the hearing it was decided “that P. Ririnui be cautioned for swearing on the field with a proviso that he will be very severely dealt with in the event of a repetition”. Rangataua then lost their next match against Te Puna on June 18 at the high school reserve.

Ririnui was named in the Tauranga B team to play Katikati on June 25 but ultimately played for the full Tauranga side in their game against Rangitaiki on the same day. Tauranga won a close game and in comments it was said “Ririnui's exhibition justified the confidence placed in him by the selector”. He played for Tauranga a week later in an 8–3 win over Matamata. In comments about the players it was said that “Cullimore and Ririnui were conspicuous” in the forwards. He was subsequently chosen for their next match against Te Puke for the Te Hurinui Apanui Shield on July 9. Tauranga beat the home side, Te Puke 6–0 to win the shield. In the first half when on attack “Ririnui broke away, but through over-eagerness kicked too hard and Cleary beat him for the ball and forced”. In the second half “Ririnui broke through and passed out to Cullimore, who put in a great run before being well tackled” on the tryline. Then midway through the half he was “attacked with cramp and the game had to be held up for a few moments”. After the win he was chosen in the reserves for Tauranga to play Rangitaiki. In comments following the game against Te Puke the Bay of Plenty Times columnist ‘Old Boy’ wrote that “if Ririnui wishes to keep his place in the team he must exert himself more. He has the ability but is lazy”.

Despite the criticism Ririnui, still only 19 years of age was chosen by the Bay of Plenty selectors for the reserves to play in their match against New Zealand Māori. Ultimately he didn't play and was named in the Tauranga reserves for their game against Te Puke a week later. His Rangataua club defaulted their match against Cadets Old Boys and then Ririnui registered with the Athletics club. The union held over the registration until the secretary of the Rangataua club could respond that he had paid his club subscription. On August 17 the registration was still held over “pending a reply from the Rangataua club's secretary”. Then on September 3 Ririnui turned out for Rangataua once more in a friendly match with Matakana. The match had been unscheduled and the Tauranga Rugby Union deemed both team in breach of the official schedule and disqualified both teams for the remainder of the season. The players were also suspended but the suspensions were lifted for the Māori players so that they could play for Tauranga Māori against Matamata Māori on October 1. Ririnui was subsequently named in the Tauranga Māori side for the match. There was no coverage of the game if it indeed even took place. Ririnui's final chance to play in the year was for Tauranga against Waihi when he was named in the reserves but he did not take the field and his season came to an end.

==== 1933 Rangataua, Tauranga, BOP Māori ====
In 1933 Ririnui continued to play for the Rangataua club and was selected for Tauranga 7 times and also played for Bay of Plenty Māori for the one and only time of his career. He scored a try for Rangataua in their opening match of the season against Athletics on May 6. Early in the match he was prominent in loose forward work. Later in the game “with one of his characteristic dashes, pushed over and touched down”. He then “led the forwards” in a 6–6 draw with Cadets Old Boys. He was reported to have “played a great game”. Following a 17–3 loss to Matakana Ririnui was selected to go into training for the Tauranga representative side. Then after the May 27 game for Rangataua v Te Puna he was chosen in the starting XV for Tauranga's match with Hamilton on June 3. They were said to have “an exceptionally strong set” of forwards with Ririnui in the second row.

Tauranga won the match 8-3 and afterwards he was selected in the Bay of Plenty Māori team to play against Matamata Māori on June 10. The match was for the Omeka Cup, to be played at Bedford Park in Matamata. Ririnui played in the second row with the Bay of Plenty Māori side losing 9 points to 8. He next played in a 13–11 loss for Rangataua against Athletic on June 17 and was subsequently named in the Tauranga team for their June 24 game against Matamata. Tauranga was well beaten, 34–6 at the Tauranga Domain. In comments on the game ‘Old Boy’ in the Bay of Plenty Times wrote that “Ririnui disappointed a little in the line-outs, but otherwise worked well”. He was named to play for the same side against Te Puke for the Parata Cup the following weekend. During the same week the Tauranga Rugby Union recommended Ririnui for the Bay of Plenty representative side for their July 8 match. Ultimately he was not amongst those selected. Tauranga beat Te Puke 16 to 11 and he was requested to train for the upcoming Tauranga v Rangitaiki match. He played for Rangataua in their 17–0 against Cadets Old Boys on July 8 and was then chosen for Tauranga for the Rangitaiki match on July 15. Ririnui and C. Cameron were prominent in the second half but Tauranga lost 24-0. He then played a “fine game” for Tauranga in their 16–11 win over Whakatane. He was named amongst players requested to keep training to stay fit for future representative fixtures. He returned to his club side, Rangataua for their 3–3 draw with Matakana before playing for Tauranga once more on August 19 against Te Puke for the Phelan Memorial Cup. Tauranga won 19 to 15 and Ririnui was again named to play for them the following weekend against Rangitaiki for the Te Hurinui Apanui Shield at Matata. Tauranga lost 16 to 3. On September 2 Ririnui scored the winning try for Rangataua in a 8–6 win over Te Puna. Early in the game he broke through from a line out and was stopped on the line. His try came late in the match when he went “over in the north-eastern corner” with Faulkner's conversion securing the win. Rangataua then beat Matakana 13–11 on September 9 before their and Ririnui's final game of the season. They were playing Te Puna in the final of the Gilbey Cup at the Tauranga Domain on September 23. Rangataua lost 10 points to 3.

==== 1934 Rangataua, Tauranga, and Tauranga Māori ====
In 1934 Ririnui played 7 matches for his Rangataua club, a Tauranga trial match, 7 games for Tauranga representative side, and 2 games for Tauranga Māori. His first game of the season was for Rangataua on April 28 and saw them win 16 to 9 against Cadets Old Boys. Ririnui then scored a try in a 14–6 win over Matakana on May 5. It came when he secured the ball “from a lineout and dropped over to score”. They then lost to Te Puna on May 12 before he was unavailable for a May 19 game against Athletics where they played a man short and lost 22-11.

Ririnui was then chosen in the Probables side for a Tauranga trial match on May 26. In the first half when the play was tight “P. Ririnui broke away in a strong run to the Possibles’ twenty five. Possibles worked back steadily and Ririnui sent P. Bidois away, D. Cameron checking. Probables supported well and Richards scored”. He was subsequently selected in the Tauranga representative side to play Rangitaiki on June 4. Tauranga lost at the Tauranga Domain 9 points to 8. Ririnui returned to his Rangataua club for three games against Cadets Old Boys, Matakana, and Te Puna on June 9, 16, and 23 respectively. He was selected to play for Tauranga against Te Puke for the Parata Cup on June 30. In the meantime he was “charged with obtaining £6 from Claud Wall, of Welcome Bay, by selling him a horse which did not belong to Ririnui. He was placed on probation for twelve months and ordered to make restitution”. He played in the forwards for Tauranga in an 18–0 loss to Te Puke.

Ririnui was selected for their next match with the visiting Grafton club from Auckland on July 7. Grafton won the game 20 points to 11. Early in the game he was involved in an attacking forward movement with Jack Bidois and Tangitu which saw them sweep over the line but fail to score. The Bay of Plenty Times said that the best on the day for Tauranga in the forwards were Ririnui, Tangitu, and Rhodes. He played for Tauranga once more against Te Puke on July 14 in a Phelan Memorial Cup match. Tauranga won 6 points to 3. In the first half Te Puke were “pressing hard when P. Ririnui secured and dodged several men. He then punted over the opposing backs and Grey followed up rapidly with only Morgan in front, but the latter reached the ball first and forced down”. The Te Puke Times wrote that “Jones, Ririnui, and Tangitu [were] doing good work”.

Ririnui's next match was in a mid-week friendly for Tauranga Māori against Te Puke Māori on July 18. The game was played at Rugby Park in Te Puke and saw the Tauranga Māori side win 13-8. Ririnui was heavily involved throughout the match. He led the forwards from a kick off following a try “right down to Te Puke's line”. Later he secured the ball from a scrum “and put in a great run but was stopped just short of the line” with a try resulting shortly after. Then Ririnui “who was playing a great game, secured at half-way and ran fifty yards before sending a pass infield which went astray”. He then led another forward movement with Honiara and Ormsby which took play right to Te Puke's line but it was cleared. Tauranga Māori scored soon after and then “from the kick off P. Ririnui gained possession and set their backs going but Bidois was pushed into touch”. He was named in the reserves for the Bay of Plenty representative side for their match with Poverty Bay at Opotiki on July 28. He was not required to play and stayed in Tauranga to play for Rangataua against Te Puna. He was playing in the backs in a 19–5 loss and “was early prominent and took play into the Te Puna twenty-five”. He was selected in the Tauranga side for their game with Matamata on August 1 but was then left out of the side. On August 6 Ririnui appeared in court charged with stealing another horse. It was valued at £16 10s and belonged to P. McKenna. Ririnui pleaded guilty and “told the constable that the horse had been on his grandfather's property for some time and he turned it off many times but it jumped back on to the property”. He was “taking horses to Maketu and this horse followed him. Thinking the horse had no owner he sold it for £10. The land be grazed was at Mangatawa and “was a kind of communal grazing ground where free grazing ground for ownerless and deserted horses existed”. After taking into account the unusual circumstances the court “entered a conviction and fined accused £5; also that a refund of £10 be made to the purchaser”.

On August 8 Ririnui played in a Tauranga trial side against a ‘Māori’ team in Tauranga. He then played in a match on August 18 for Tauranga v Rangitaiki for the Te Hurinui Apanui Shield at Te Teko. Tauranga lost 16 to 3. A week later Ririnui scored two tries for Tauranga in a 27–16 win over Te Puke at Te Puke for the Ratana Cup. After Tauranga had attacked Ririnui “following up fast, secured the ball and raced over near the posts”. In the second half he “secured from the drop out and beat nearly the whole of the Te Puke team before passing to I. Tangitu who went over near the posts”. Tauranga “continued to throw the ball about and both backs and forwards combined in a movement that terminated in P. Ririnui scoring” which made the score 22-13. Ririnui was then selected for the Tauranga Māori side against Whakatorea who were from the Opotiki area. The game was played at the Tauranga Domain on September 15 and saw the visitors win 13 to 8. Ririnui was only mentioned early in the game when he was involved in a forward attack that didn't lead to points. It was his last game of the season.

Ririnui then played cricket over the summer for the Te Puna club. He was first mentioned in a match against Pahoia when he took 2 wickets and was dismissed for one run when he batted in a first innings win. In a game a week later he again scored just the one run and took another wicket in a loss against Whakamarama. Then against Omokoroa-Pahoia combined he scored two runs in the first innings and none in the second but once again took a wicket. Then in late October he scored two runs and zero in a match with Whakarama. That appears to be his last game for them.

==== 1935 Rangataua, Tauranga, Tauranga Māori, and Bay of Plenty debut ====
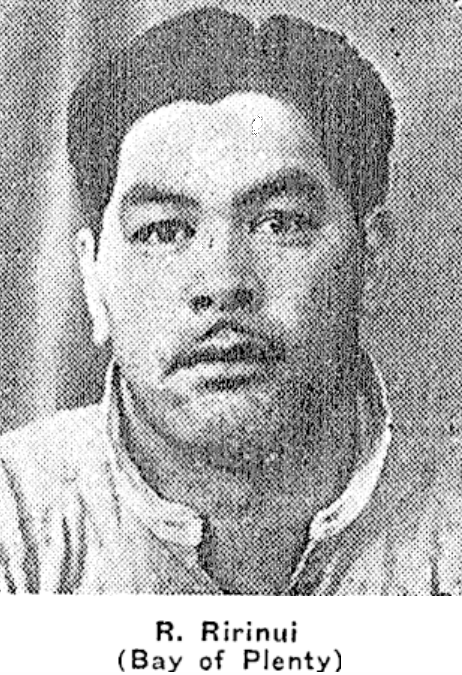

The 1935 season was to see 22 year old Ririnui make his Bay of Plenty debut when he played against the East Coast on June 29. He played five games for them in total. He also played eight club games for Rangataua, five games for Tauranga, and two games for Tauranga Māori. His first game of the season was for his Rangataua club against Papamoa United on May 4. It was the opening game of the season in a new combined competition with Tauranga and Te Puke clubs. Papamoa United won 5-0. He didn't play in their next game against Te Puna a week later but played in a 23–3 loss to Matakana in the 3rd round on May 18. Rangataua then lost to Mateku (Te Puke) 26 to 6 on May 25 with a Ririnui scoring a try but it was not stated which one as there were three playing. Rangataua beat Te Pune in their June 1 match by 14 points to 5. In the meantime he had been selected in the Tauranga team to play Te Puke on Monday the 3rd of June. The game was for the Parata Cup with Ririnui in the second row of a 14–14 draw. He was involved in an early forward movement that saw I. Tangitu score. Ririnui was nominated by the Bay of Plenty union as one of fifteen players for the prospective combined Bay of Plenty-Poverty Bay-East Coast-Hawkes Bay Māori team to play for the Prince of Wales Cup on June 22. The next weekend on June 8 Ririnui was heavily involved in several forward attacks in a 6–6 draw with Matakana. Rangataua then beat the same opponent the next weekend 9 to 8 with Ririnui scoring one of their tries. After the match he was named in the Tauranga side to play Te Puke, and also the Tauranga Māori team to play Opotiki Māori for the Omeka Cup on the coming Wednesday.

The Tauranga Māori side lost 12 to 3 on a heavy ground at Opotiki. In comments before Tauranga's game for the Parata Cup with Te Puke the Bay of Plenty Times wrote that “P. Ririnui and M. Rhodes rank as two of the best forwards in the Bay of Plenty”. Tauranga lost 15–8 with Ririnui in the second row. He was only mentioned after being involved in some attacking play with Tangitu in the first half.

===== Bay of Plenty tour =====
Ririnui was selected for the Bay of Plenty representative tour of Ruatoria, Gisborne, and Wairoa in late June. He was selected in the second row for their opening game against East Coast at Ruatoria on June 29. He was playing alongside Brown, Jones, and Wickliffe. In “ideal weather conditions” East Coast won 12 points to 6. Both teams were missing “several prominent players... mainly by reason of their being included in the Māori All Black team for Australia”. However their replacements “excelled themselves in all departments of the game”. Two days later Ririnui played in their second tour match against Tolaga Bay on July 1. They lost 12 to 8 “in a most interesting game”. Ririnui was in his usual position of the second row, with Jones, Moody, and Wickliffe his partners there. They then played against Wairoa on July 4 and had their first win, 14 to 12. With Bay of Plenty leading, “Pohipi, Ririnui and Moore handled in a splendid movement and carried on with a dashing dribbling rush to threaten the Wairoa line”, they secured the ball and Pohipi ran across under the posts for “the finest try of the game”. The Poverty Bay Herald wrote that Ririnui, Moore, and Pohipi had “handled the ball like backs”. Ririnui played once more in their final tour game, against Poverty Bay on July 6 at their Oval. Bay of Plenty win 16 to 12 with it reported that “P. Ririnui, I Tangitu, Pohipi, and Moore were the best...” of their forwards. His middle row partners were E. Moody, D. Wickliffe, and R. Jones”. With Poverty Bay leading 9-3, “Ririnui made a fine interception in a red passing rush and broke away fast. Reaching Pohatu he passed to J. Brown who scored fairly wide out”. In the second half with Poverty Bay leading 12-8 “Ririnui checked another red forward attack and the blue forwards broke away to travel nearly the length of the field...”. Later then Bay of Plenty were defending Ririnui attempted to break away but was stopped. Then he and Moore gained ground down field. With the game tight Bay of Plenty managed to get the go ahead try and the conversion gave them the win.

Returning to Tauranga, Ririnui turned out for Rangataua in their Gilbey Cup match with Te Puna on July 13. They lost 22-19. After a kickoff Ririnui “broke through and handled the ball to Rhodes who touched down under the bar”. His next match was for Tauranga against the touring Parnell B club side from Auckland. In the second half Ririnui got the ball from a lineout and broke away and passed by the ball was dropped and the chance lost. Tauranga went on to win 9-0. He was said to have been “outstanding in the Tauranga pack” in a 12–11 win over Te Puke for the annual Phelan Memorial Cup on August 3. Tauranga's next game was against Rangitaiki for the Te Hurinui Apanui Shield on August 10. They lost 11-6. With the score at 3–3 at halftime “hard play by Sander, Jones, and Ririnui kept them from scoring”.

He then played for Rangataua when they beat Waihi High School Old Boy's on August 17 by 11 points to 6. Early in the game Ririnui “broke away and was joined by Ray Parkinson and McLeod, but they were held up for an infringement. Ragged play ensured until McLeod broke clear and sent a pass to P. Ririnui, who ran through and was brought down in the Waihi quarter”. Some time later in the half Rhodes, Jones, and Ririnui “got away and a fast loose rush ended in J. Parkinson scoring”. Later in the half Ririnui ran clear and passed to Svenson but he was thrown into touch.

Ririnui was then selected in the Bay of Plenty side to play King Country on August 28. In the side with him was Jack Brodrick from Whakatane. Brodrick had recently returned from Australia where he had been touring with the Māori All Blacks. The two of them would become teammates at Manukau in 1938, though Brodrick made the code switch midway through 1936. Bay of Plenty lost the match 22–17 in the last minute. Ririnui sustained an injury to his left shoulder and was attended to by St John Ambulance officers and a doctor and was taken to hospital along with the King Country captain Norman Bashgate who was concussed. Most likely due to his injury he missed Rangataua's last match against Matakana on August 21. Rangataua lost the game which was for the final of the Gilbey Cup 17–10 to Matakana. Ririnui's final game of the season was for Tauranga Māori against Ratana on October 15. The match was played on the Wharepai ground. In the visiting Ratana side was Tommy Chase who had played for the Māori All Blacks in 1934 and 1935. Chase would also become a teammate of Ririnui at the Manukau club as would Chase's younger brother Rangi Chase. Both Chase brothers, Ririnui, and Jack Brodrick would all go on to be selected for the New Zealand rugby league team. The visit of the Ratana group which consisted of senior and junior rugby teams and the Ratana leader, M. Ratana along with several candidates for election in the upcoming national election. In the game, Ririnui “was conspicuous in fast open work with Hartnett, W. McLeod and Kingi, but the visiting backs checked”. Later on he “dashed up to the line but lost the ball as he was about to touch down”.

==== 1936 Rangataua, Tauranga, and Tauranga Māori ====
In 1936 Ririnui completed his 5th season with his Rangataua club, playing seven games, while playing seven games for Tauranga, and two games for Tauranga Māori. The 1936 season saw a change in position for Ririnui. He moved into the five eighths for his Rangataua club side. Their first game was against Cadets Old Boys on May 2 which they lost 19-14. Ririnui “made an opening and after evading several men passed to M. Ririnui who sprinted across and scored”. It was reported during the week that he had “played an outstanding game”. Rangataua then had a 23–8 win over Matakana on May 9. At one point mid game Ririnui “opened up the game and broke clear”. Rangataua beat Te Puna 12 to 5 on the Hamilton Street ground on May 16 with Ririnui in the five eighths once more.

The following weekend Rangataua defeated Cadets Old Boys 13 to 9. The Bay of Plenty Times wrote that in the Rangataua side “the outstanding man is P. Ririnui, who has been very successful as five eighths and has no local equal in this position”. They had a 16–8 loss to Matakana on May 30 with Ririnui conspicuous in bright play and his backs supported strongly”. Rangataua lost their next game to Te Puna 16 to 11. Confusingly he was not named in the Rangataua side which played Cadets on June 13, and then on June 20 there was a P. Ririnui named in the Te Puna side.

Ririnui was named in the Tauranga side for their first representative game of the season to play Te Puna in Tauranga on July 11 and he club was listed as Rangataua. Despite having been playing in the backs Ririnui was chosen in the second row for Tauranga. He fielded the kick off and “sent up a high ball, with the home forwards following through...”. At one point in the first half “the Te Puke forwards pushed down the eastern line and Ririnui kicked clear...”. He was also “prominent in several openings and handled exceptionally well”. Later he “and Dare combined in a dribbling movement which was stopped by Kelly”. Tauranga lost a close game 14-13 and after its conclusion Ririnui was named in the Tauranga side to play the visiting Parnell club from Auckland on July 18. Tauranga won the match 16 to 3 on the Tauranga Domain.

Rangataua lost to Matakana 19–5 on July 25 and Ririnui was named in the Tauranga Māori team which was playing in Opotiki on August 1 against Whakatohea which the Tauranga Māori side won 6 to 3. He was selected in the Tauranga team to play Matamata on August 8. He was playing in the forwards and led them along with Jones and Ngahoe in a forward attack during the first half. Tauranga won easily 17 to 3. Ririnui was again in the Tauranga forwards in a 10–6 win over Rangitaiki on August 15. The victory saw them lift the Te Hurinui Apanui Shield. In the first half Jones “secured from the line and handed to P. Ririnui on to Kakau, who ran on strongly to score”. Tauranga were then tasked with defending the shield against Te Puke on August 22. They won 19-6. With the score 6–3 to Te Puke there was a “splendid movement by the home forwards, led by P. Ririnui, which was stopped right on the Te Puke line”. Later in the match “the home forwards drove over but P. Ririnui could not touch down”. Ririnui was in the Tauranga side to defend the shield once more the next weekend against Opotiki. Tauranga won by 11 points to 9 with Ririnui heavily involved in their attack. Early in the match Ririnui “made an opening and Ngahoe ran clear but was called back”. Soon after he “made an opening and sent Murray away on the western wing, but Walker stopped him in the north-eastern corner”. He was part of a forward surge that saw Ngahoe score to make it 6-6, then soon after he “broke away from a lineout and was joined by Ngahoe who dribbled clear” but an Opotiki back saved. Then he supported Hartnett who made a break which led to Kakau scoring in the corner.

===== Tairawhiti Māori =====
He played again in a defence of the Te Hurinui Apanui Shield against Rangitaiki on September 5. This time they lost it 19 points to 0. After the match the Bay of Plenty team to play Thames Valley was named and Ririnui was in it. He was also named in the Māori side to play matches on the East Coast but he was unable to attend so was chosen in the Bay of Plenty side. Ultimately however Ririnui was able to travel and took his place in the Tairawhiti (East Coast) side to play against Tai Tokerau (Auckland) on September 12 at Ruatoria. The match was for the Prince of Wales Cup. Tairawhiti won the game 22 points to 14 in front of a “record crowd”. Ririnui was in the second row. It was said that honours were even in the lineouts between Lockwood and Ririnui for Tairawhiti and H. Whiu, W. Cooper, and O. Nepia for the visiting side with all prominent throughout. Ririnui was said to have been one of the outstanding forwards for the winners along with B. Rogers, J. Greening, and Ra Paenga. After the match the Māori All Black side was going to be named to play the touring Australian side on September 23 and it was thought that Ririnui was a good chance of being named however he was not selected. Ririnui's final game of the season was for Tauranga Māori against Kaokaoroa Māori. The later side was selected from players from the Okauia, Te Poi, Waharoa, and Putaruru districts. The match was played on October 3 and was for the Peina Memorial Shield with Tauranga Maori winning 23–10 in Tauranga. During the first half Ririnui “made a great opening and ran down the western flank. Kakau went with him and was checked by Stead a yard off the line”. The Tauranga Māori side scored from a scrum moments later.

==== 1937 Rangataua, Tauranga, Tauranga Māori, Bay of Plenty, and Combined team v Sout Africa ====
The 1937 season was to be Ririnui's last season of rugby union. He played 8 games for his Rangataua club scoring a try, 4 games for Tauranga, 1 game for Tauranga Māori, 3 games for Bay of Plenty, and was chosen for the combined Poverty Bay-East Coast-Bay of Plenty team to play against the touring South African side.

Ririnui began the season playing 6 games for Rangataua in the Jordan Cup. The first was a practice game against United on April 23 won by Rangataua 14 to 13. Losses to Cadets Old Boys on May 1 by 13 to 8, and Matakana on May 8 by 11 to 8 followed. He scored a try in a 14–6 win over United on May 22. He was one of the leaders in the forwards and in the “second half Jones, Clay, T. Kakau and P. Ririnui being conspicuous in fast rucking”. Later Jones and Ririnui led the forwards in an attack into United Services’ half, and a short time after “Rangataua worked back down the line and the ball was passed to P. Ririnui who ran strongly. He was tackled on the line but threw himself over and touched down”. Ririnui was heavily involved in an 18–12 loss to Cadets on May 29. In the second half he made a break from a lineout but the backs handling lost a good chance to score. On June 5 Ririnui was heavily involved once more in much of Rangataua's attack in a 17–8 win over Matakana. He took part in several forward attacks and in the second half he “gained possession and broke away, covering sixty yards before he was tackled”.

Ririnui was selected in the Tauranga representative side for a June 12 game against Rangitaiki at Tauranga Domain. He was playing in the second row and in the first half “smart play by McNeile, Mitchell, and P. Ririnui transferred activities to the Rangitaiki quarter”. He was involved in another attacking forward movement as well but ultimately they lost 5-3. After the game he was named in the reserves for Tauranga Māori against Putaruru Māori on June 19 for the Peina Shiled and was not required to play. He returned to his Rangataua club side for two games against Cadets Old Boys on June 26 and Matakana on July 3. He was mentioned as being involved in a forward attacking movement in the 18–9 loss to Cadets, while they drew with Matakana 14-14.

Ririnui was selected in the Tauranga side to play Rangitaiki on July 10 for the Parata Cup. Tauranga won 8 to 4 at Matata. His next match was for Tauranga Māori against Rotoiti Māori for the Paina Shield at Tauranga Domain. The sides drew 6–6 with Ririnui in the second row for both games. He played for Tauranga again on July 31 in a match with Te Puke. Tauranga won 20–0 in a Parata Cup match. From a first half lineout Clay and Ririnui “broke through, but Lillas checked [their] progress”. Then in the second half he was involved in a forward attack which ended in Moses Murray scoring.

===== Bay of Plenty selection =====
Ririnui was then chosen for the Bay of Plenty representative side following his debut for them 2 seasons earlier. They were playing Poverty Bay at Opotiki on August 21 with Ririnui named in the second row. Poverty Bay won the match 25 to 11. The match was one of a series of representative games to help the selectors chose the combined side to meet the touring South African side. The Poverty Bay Herald noted that the Bay of Plenty forwards were “lightish” apart from Ririnui and M. Howell. They struggled to win scrum ball but Ririnui, Poihipi and McNeil were the best of them in loose play. He was selected for the Bay of Plenty's next match on August 28 against Thames Valley on Tauranga Domain. Bay of Plenty won the game easily by 30 points to 6. Just before the end of the match “Ririnui made a fast run and then sent the ball to T. Whiteley, who scored”. Whiteley had played for New Zealand Maori on their 1935 tour of Australia. Ririnui's next game was for Tauranga against Opotiki on September 4. The match was cancelled however as Opotiki could not raise a team.

Ririnui was then selected for a mid week game on September 8 between Bay of Plenty and East Coast at Whakatane Domain. Neither team could break the oppositions defence and the game finished a 0–0 draw. After the game the Rotorua Morning Post wrote that “the best forward on the field was Ririnui, of Tauranga, who was ably supported by Moore, the Bay hooker...”. The Poverty Bay Herald said that “two of the outstanding forwards in the Bay of Plenty pack were Ririnui and T. Whitely...”. Three days later he captained the Tauranga side in a game against Rangitaiki in a Te Hurinui Apanui Shield at Matata. Rangitaiki retained the shield with a 12–3 win after Ririnui had won the toss and chose to defend the eastern end, “against a fresh north-westerly breeze”. Early in the game McNeile and Ririnui broke through to the Rangitaiki 22 but could get past a sound defence. Soon after fullback F. Barnes took the ball at speed and “with Ririnui's support, he penetrated the home quarter, before being thrown out”.

===== Combined Teams to play the Springboks =====
Ririnui's good form during the season was rewarded with selection in the combined side to play against the touring South African (Springboks) side. He was aged 24 at the time, a few weeks short of his 25th birthday. The combined side was made up of the best players from Bay of Plenty, East Coast, and Poverty Bay. They team were to play in Gisborne on September 18. He was originally selected in the second row but ultimately played in the front row with D. Tuhoro and W. Matheson. They were opposed by the Springbok front row of S.C. Louw, M.M. Louw, and H. Martin. The Poverty Bay Herald wrote that “the inclusion of Whiteley and Ririnui, of the Bay of Plenty, was certain after their representative displays in the trial game on Wednesday last at Whakatane...”. The same publication previewed the game and said that “three of the Maori scrummagers tip the beam at over 15st., the heaviest man being Ririnui, who is 15st. 7lb. The team should not be at a disadvantage in lineouts either for the average height of the forwards is over 6ft”. Up against a powerful side they were defeated 33 points to 3 after trailing 18–0 at halftime. The game was extensively covered by the New Zealand newspapers and the Auckland Star said that “on occasional lineouts, the two Maoris, Ririnui and Tuhoro proved to be a pair of great opportunists”. The game was played before a crowd of 7 to 8,000, the largest seen for a sporting event in the area, in “brilliant sunshine and a southerly breeze” on a “hard ground”. The Greymouth Evening Star's correspondent said that “Ririnui, 15st 8lbs, a superb specimen, whose grand physique, plus fiery all-round play, suggested All Black potentialities”. And “among the forwards, Ririnui was outstanding. He made several glorious breaks, which should have yielded tries, but he was not supported. Frequently he bowled over the Springboks by sheer weight and determination”. In the first half the combined team “got away from the scrum again with a good forward rush, in which Matheson, Lockwood and Ririnui were prominent”. At one point in the second half “Ririnui broke away from the scrum and Rogers electrified the crowd when he continued with the ball at foot. In comments the following week the Poverty Bay Herald wrote that “for the combined team, Ririnui, Tuhoro, Rogers, F. McAneny, and Matheson impressed the most among the forwards”. Rogers was “almost up to the Springbok standard, and he shared honours in this department with Ririnui...”. They noted that one “serious lack of support was shown when Ririnui got away, with lonely Lockwood backing him up. A section of their article was titled “Ririnui's Solo Breakaway” and said “that sortie surprised the home team as much as it did the Springboks, Ririnui getting away with the ball from a loose scrum on the home team's right wing, and breaking into the clear in great style. Only Lockwood went with him, however, and between them they were unable to carry the attack through to success, though they deserved credit for their bid”.

After the match the Tauranga Rugby Union congratulated Ririnui “for the excellent game played by him against the Springboks at Gisborne”. On September 25 the Bay of Plenty Times put out a piece on Ririnui. It was titled “A Great Forward” and said “A press reference to the play of P. Ririnui, the Tauranga forward, in the match against the Springboks at Gisborne, says “Ririnui capped his good games in the trials with a great exhibition of forward play in the tight and in the open. A break down the touch line from near his own 25 to over the Springbok 25 was perhaps the best individual bit of forward work in the match. It caught the defence entirely on the wrong foot, excepting Brand who came across to bluff him into passing too soon, and then dropped Lockwood as he touched the ball. This was a run well deserving of a try”. A week later the Springboks beat the All Blacks at Eden Park and it was said that “in the whole of the New Zealand pack there was not one man who succeeded against the Springboks as well as Ririnui and Tuhoro, in the game at Gisborne”. The Springbok captain, Philip J. Nel said after the game that Ririnui was one of the best forwards that they met on the entire tour.

=== Rugby League ===
==== 1938 Transfer to Manukau Rugby League club ====
Following the 1937 season Ririnui was approached by the Manukau rugby league club to join them in the Auckland Rugby League competition. It was first reported that he was going to rugby league in mid February with it said “Peter Ririnui, a 15st. forward hailing from the Bay of Plenty impressed as a forward with possibilities in the East Coast and Springboks match at Gisborne last September. The Hawkes Bay selector present at that game was heard making inquiries concerning Peter [with it thought he might join the Old Boys club] but interest ceased when it was learned that the native was a farmer and married. Ririnui, it is now reported has succumbed to the blandishments of the league game and this winter will play for the Manukau club in the Auckland competition”. The New Zealand Herald wrote “The Manukau Rugby League Club has acquired the services of P. Ririnui, of Tauranga, for next season. RIrinui has already arrived in Auckland...”. Another teammate from the area T. Kakau was also joining the club. During the season he played 23 games for them scoring four tries. He also represented Auckland Māori in one match and scored a try, and he also played for the Auckland representative team once and scored a try.

On March 10 the Auckland Star reported the squad for the Manukau team for the year. The team was prominently made up of Māori players which was very unique in Auckland at this time. The side would include the likes of George Nēpia, Jack Hemi, Tommy Chase, Walter Brimble, Rangi Chase, Jack Brodrick, and Angus Gault who all were either New Zealand representatives or would go on to be. His first game for them was a pre-season match against a South Auckland XIII at Waikaraka Park in Onehunga on March 26. They won 32 to 6. On April 2 they played in an official pre-season game against Ponsonby at Carlaw Park. Manukau won 19 to 11 with it said Manukau's “new forward Peter Ririnui... made a good impression in his first appearance...”. The Herald said that he “comes with a great reputation and is of splendid physique”.

Manukau's first game in the Fox Memorial Shield competition saw them lose on the number 2 field at Carlaw Park 19 points to 8 to Newton Rangers. During the first half Ririnui and Peter Mahima “penetrated the Newton defence and [Harry] Zane-Zaninovich scored”. At the end of the game it was said that Angus Gault had stood out in the forwards and “he received good support from Ririnui”. The Auckland Star said “the outstanding player, both in scrum work and loose was the massive Ririnui”. He played in a 26–21 win over North Shore Albions in round 2, and then an 18–4 win against Marist in round 3. Manukau won again in round 5 on May 7, 17 points to 9 over Mount Albert. Once again Gault was “prominent in the forwards and was well supported by Brodrick, and Ririnui”.

Ririnui's first try for Manukau came the next week in a 18–16 win over Richmond Rovers in the feature match at Carlaw Park. However his game was marred by being sent off for fighting with Richmond's Alf Broadhead, who was also sent off. The Herald said that Ririnui “appeared very unlucky to gain the displeasure of the referee”. Before he was sent off he was said to have been part of a “fine trio” along with Angus Gault and Jack Brodrick. It was reported that at the ARL management committee meeting the pair “were severely cautioned”. Despite only having been playing the game for months Ririnui was named in the reserves for one of the trial matches at Carlaw Park. It was a curtain-raiser for the North Island v South Island match on May 21 however he was not required to play in the match (Probables v Possibles). Ririnui played well once more in a 23–19 win over City Rovers on May 28. He and Gault were “were the leaders” in the forwards.

===== Auckland Māori selection =====
Following a surprise 18–15 defeat to Papakura on June 4, Ririnui was named in the Auckland Māori squad to play Auckland Pākehā on June 6 at Carlaw Park. In comments by the Auckland Star after the Papakura game they said Ririnui “is settling down to give good service”. He was then picked in the match day side in the front row alongside Joe Cootes and Alex Nathan. Their front row opponents were Alf Broadhead, Bert Leatherbarrow, and Richard (Dick) Shadbolt. Auckland Māori won the match 26 to 21 with Ririnui scoring one of their six tries. With Auckland leading 13 to 11 at halftime the Māori side attacked but “the bounce of the ball beat Wilson and Ririnui and [Ted] Mincham secured possession to score the easiest of tries”. The Māori were now “playing bright, spirited football”, with Martin Hansen, Alex Nathan, Ririnui, and Joe Cootes “prominent in the forwards”. His try came when he took a pass from Jack Tristram “and forced his way over”. The conversion by Tommy Chase equalised the scores at 21-all.

Ririnui returned to his Manukau side for a 13–5 loss to Ponsonby on June 11 in Round 9, and a 5–2 win over Newton on June 18. They then suffered a very heavy 37–7 defeat by North Shore on June 25 however Ririnui was “the pick of the forwards”. Another loss followed against Marist on July 2 when Manukau only managed one try when losing 24-3. Ririnui was involved in it after Mihaka Panapa made an opening for Ririnui who sent Richard Shalfoon over. In the Manukau forwards George Shilton, Ririnui, and George Whye “were the pick”. They returned to form on July 23 when they defeated City 18 to 4 with Ririnui instrumental in the win. After leading 3-0, “Ririnui raced to halfway and Brodrick snapped up the ball for Whye to score a nice try”. The Herald wrote that “Ririnui was the best of the forwards and should soon be rewarded with a place in the representative team”. In a 6–6 draw with Richmond the following weekend in round 15 Ririnui was “always in the picture in the forward line”. While the Auckland Star said that Ririnui and Freddie McGuire were the best workers in the tight forward play.

===== Auckland selection v Canterbury =====
Following the round of club games Ririnui was selected to make his Auckland representative debut against Canterbury at Carlaw Park on August 13. He was chosen in the second row with Jack Brodrick with Merv Devine at lock. Their second row opponents were G Bellamy, and R Barnard, with E Grimes at lock. Auckland won the match 28 points to 22 with Ririnui scoring one of their six tries. The Auckland Star said that “Ririnui fully justified his selection...”. The Christchurch Press wrote that Jack McLeod, Ririnui, and Brodrick “were the outstanding forwards”. His try came when he crossed in the second half with Jack Hemi converting. During the following week the Star wrote that the form player at the moment was McLeod, but that “Ririnui of Manukau, was fully deserving of representative honours”.

He returned to his Manukau side for their final round championship against Ponsonby. They won 26 to 14 to finish fourth. They now began the Roope Rooster knockout competition with a round 2 game against Papakura on September 3 at Prince Edward Park in Papakura. In a 28–6 win Ririnui was “outstanding” along with Tommy Chase and Jack Hemi. The Franklin Times wrote that Ririnui and Hemi were “conspicuous all the time”. They were eliminated from the competition with a 16–8 defeat by City on September 10. Ririnui and Angus Gault gave good support to Jack Brodrick.

Manukau now were relegated to the Phelan Shield consolation knockout competition. Ririnui scored a try for them in their September 17 win over Mount Albert by 26 points to 17. He, Gault, and Brodrick “did a lot of good work among the forwards”. Then in the semi final he scored once more in an easy 26–8 win over Ponsonby. The match was curtain-raiser to the Marist Old Boys game against the touring Eastern Suburbs side from Sydney. There were 9,000 in attendance by the time the later match started. For Manukau, Ririnui, Gault, and Freddie McGuire “were the pick of the forwards”.

Ririnui was unsurprisingly selected in Manukau's side to play against Eastern Suburbs in their September 28 match. It was played on a Wednesday. Manukau lost 17 points to 6 with Ririnui continuing his try scoring run, getting their only try. The Auckland Star wrote that Manukau's forwards “led by Ririnui, who was one of the outstanding players of the day...”. They missed New Zealand representative Jack Hemi who was ill, and Jack Brodrick left the field with a first half injury which majorly hampered their chances of success. They trailed at halftime 10-2, but “Ririnui, after once failing, wriggled and heaved his way over the line” with Tommy Chase converting to narrow it to 10–7 before Eastern Suburbs later extended their lead and won. Another newspaper described it as Manukau having had made a “powerful rush” in the forwards before Ririnui “dived over”. He returned to his Manukau side for their final game of the season which was the Phelan Shield final against Papakura on October 1. It was the curtain-raiser to the Eastern Suburbs sides final tour match in Auckland against Richmond Rovers with 11,000 attending. Manukau won the trophy for the first time in their history with an 18–8 win. The pick of the Manukau forwards were Gault, Ririnui, and Harry Zane-Zaninovich.

==== 1939 Manukau, Auckland Māori, North Island, and New Zealand ====
The 1939 season was to be the most significant of Ririnui's career in either code. He played 14 games for Manukau, scoring four tries before gaining representative selection for Auckland Māori, then the North Island, and then being chosen for the New Zealand team for their tour of England.

He began his season in a round 1 Fox Memorial championship game against Ponsonby on the Carlaw Park number 2 field which they lost 29-22. He was then chosen in the Manukau side to play the touring Sydney XIII side on April 15. Manukau lost the game 23 points to 10 after trailing 15–3 at halftime.

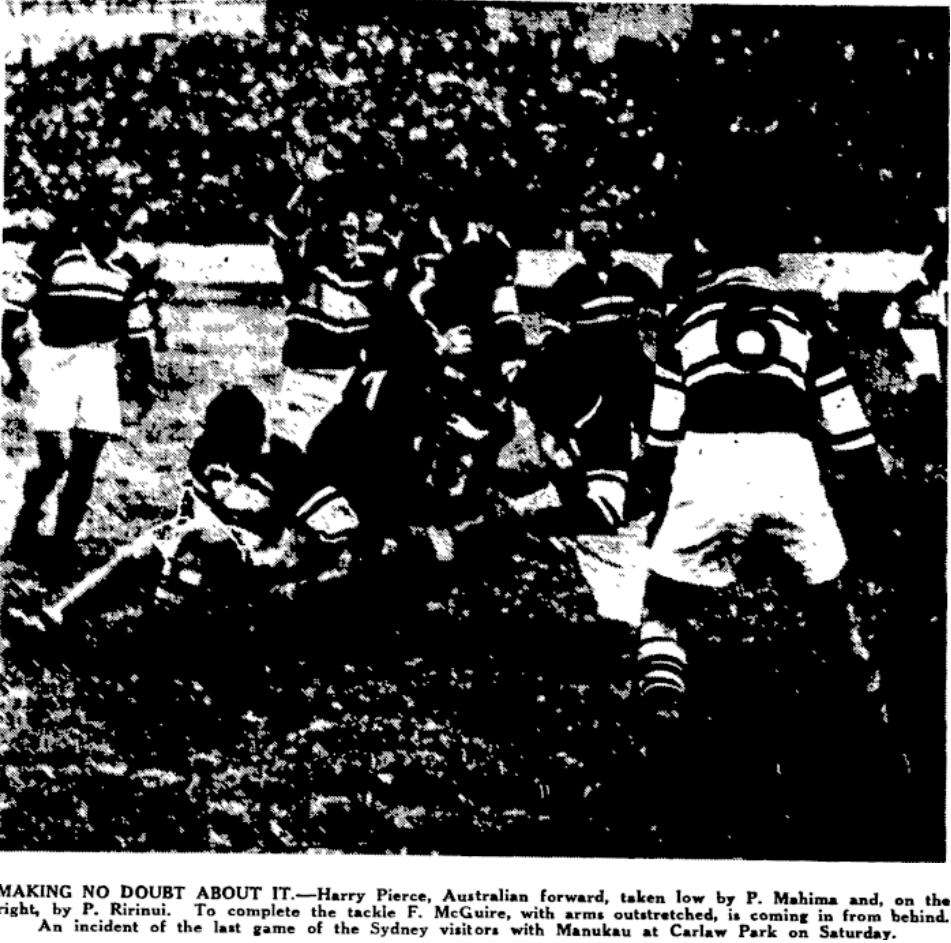
Harry Pierce being tackled by Peter Mahima and Pita Ririnui.

A photograph of Peter Mahima and Ririnui tackling Harry Pierce was published in the Auckland Star after the match. He was said to have been “the outstanding forward and he played a dashing game”. He played at prop with J Marsh, and Freddie McGuire at hooker. They were up against the front row of Ray Stehr, G. Watt, and F Griffiths. After half time Gault and Ririnui headed an attack, with Mihaka Panapa sending George Whye over for a try. After the last tour game it was said that a number of forwards seen against them “played high class football” and “their chances of eventually winning a place in the New Zealand team appear bright” with Ririnui mentioned amongst them.

Ririnui now began a several week stretch in the Manukau side in the Fox Memorial championship. On April 22 they played Papakura and won 20-0. It was said that Angus Gault, Ririnui and Jack Brodrick played so well in the loose that they were as good as the three-quarters and “played fine games”. Soon after the kick off Tommy Chase scored after Gault and Ririnui had gained ground. The Herald wrote that “the brilliant play of the forwards was a feature, Brodrick and Ririnui showing outstanding form. The last-named is one of the most improved forwards in the code”. At this point in the season Waka McLeod joined the Manukau side. He had been a teammate of Ririnui at Rangataua and played with him for Tauranga. Manukau won again against North Shore on April 29, by 23 points to 7 with “Ririnui always in the picture [and] he did some splendid work in the tight”. The Star said that he was “outstanding” in their next game, a 38–15 loss over Mount Albert in the feature match at Carlaw Park. The New Zealand Herald wrote about the form of the player in Auckland and in a section titled “Prominent Forwards – Brodrick And Ririnui” said “there are two Manukau forwards who should have strong claims for inclusion in the New Zealand team. They are Brodrick and Ririnui... Ririnui is of splendid physique and is a great worker in the tight as well as being able to do his share in the loose. Weighty forwards like Ririnui are the type needed to stand up to a hard overseas tour”. Manukau suffered a 15–5 loss to Richmond in round 6 with Ririnui showing good support to their best forward, Angus Gault. His first try of the season came against City Rovers in a 21–0 win on May 20 and he was “prominent among the forwards”.

At this point in the season the New Zealand Herald wrote a list of players in various positions who were in form. Ririnui was named as one of the seventeen best forwards to date. Manukau lost again to Newton Rangers on May 27 by 16 to 10 though Ririnui once again played a good game.

===== Auckland Māori =====
Ririnui was selected in the Auckland Māori squad to play against South Auckland (Waikato) Māori on May 28 at Huntly. There were no match reports or final lineups published in the newspapers though the South Auckland Māori side was said to have won 19 to 8 at Davies Park. He returned to his Manukau side for a 26–11 victory over Marist Old Boys on June 3 with Ririnui one of “the best forwards”.

Ririnui was named in Auckland Māori to play Auckland Pākehā at Carlaw Park on June 5. In a preview of the game the Herald wrote that “in Ririnui and Brodrick the Māori team can boast two fine players with strong claims for New Zealand selection”. The Auckland Māori side won 19 to 15 before a large crowd with the “Maori vanguard superiod, Ririnui, [Martin] Hansen, and Hapeta, the hooker, playing good games”. During the first half Tommy Chase “made a dashing run which was well supported by Ririnui and [Jack] Tristram”. Early in the second half with the Māori side leading 14-2, Peter Mahima “penetrated deeply and passed to Ririnui, who, however, was not supported”, then later in the half with the pace still high Hawea Mataira and Ririnui raced down field to the Pākehā teams line but no try resulted. During the following week the New Zealand Herald wrote “the importance of big men for the front row should not be lost sight of. The claims of Ririnui, Mataira, and Gault in these positions are strong ones. Ririnui is a greatly-improved forward and was outstanding on Monday”. His weight is 15st, 8lb, and he uses every ounce of it”.

Ririnui's next game was six days later on June 10 in a 10-6 round 10 win over Ponsonby. For the Manukau side “men who were never far away from where the play was thickest were Gault, Ririnui, and Marsh”. The Herald commented once more on the players in line for New Zealand selection and said “the strongest claimants for the front row positions are Mataira and Ririnui, both big forwards and powerful against the strongest opposition. But these players need instruction to assist the hooker, and a coaching school for forwards should be set up immediately”. Manukau then had a bye before a round 12 match against Papakura at Waikaraka Park in Onehunga, Manukau's home suburb. They won 24–16 with Ririnui scoring two tries. The teams exchanged the lead several times “but Ririnui put the issue beyond doubt when he bustled his way through to score two splendid tries”. His second try scored in the last few minutes was “a dashing try”. It was later described as “a great effort. He crashed past four Papakura players in a great run for the goal line”. He was said to have been “the outstanding forward”. While the Herald wrote that Ririnui, Jack Brodrick, and Harold Milliken (Papakura), “were responsible for some of the finest play seen in the code for a considerable time”. He “played another good game in the forwards” for Manukau in a 19–5 loss to North Shore on July 1.

Ririnui's strong form was rewarded with selection by Thomas McClymont, Hec Brisbane, and Gordon Hooker in the North Island team to play the South Island on July 8. He became the 112th player to represent the North Island and would ultimately play for them on three occasions. A feat which only 15 players had achieved by the time of his retirement. The match was effective the main New Zealand trial in addition to being an annual fixture. He was chosen in the second row with Harold Milliken. The North Island side won the game convincingly by 35 points to 13 before a crowd of 15,000 with Ririnui scoring one of the winning sides seven tries. After the match the Press newspaper said that “among the North forwards Ririnui is a certainty” for New Zealand selection. Early in the game he “made a great 40 yards dash and Solomon passed to Roy Nurse who scored. Soon after he “made a sensational run through South's defence, but slipped as he had Ces Mountford beaten”. Early in the second half with the North Island leading 15-7, Ririnui received the ball from Harold Milliken and “brushed aside three weak tackles and scored”. Later in the half “he snapped up and passed to Arthur Kay who sent it to Dave Solomon who scored”.

===== New Zealand selection =====
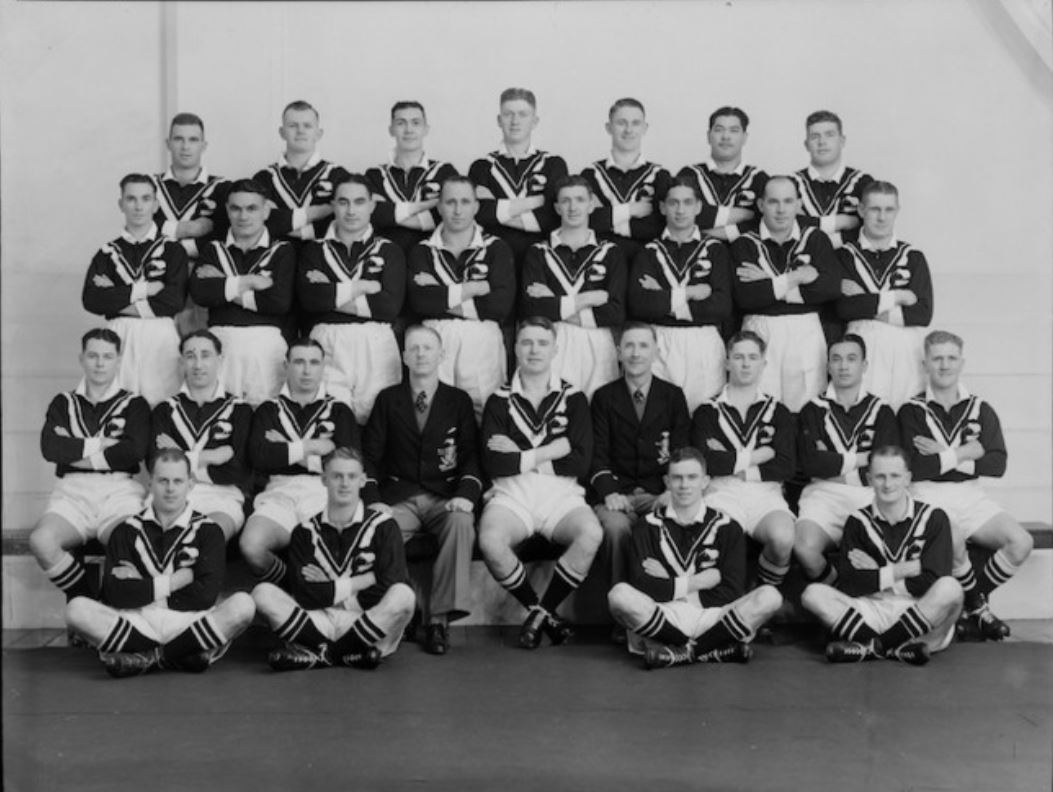
The 1939 touring New Zealand team with Ririnui in the back row, second from the right.

The Herald said “the best forward was undoubtedly P. Ririnui, whose speed and general positional play stamp him as one of the finest forwards seen for some years. His powerful running often swept aside would-be tacklers”. Unsurprisingly Ririnui was chosen by the New Zealand selectors, Thomas McClymont, Jack Redwood, and Jim Amos to tour England. The Auckland Star wrote a small piece which said “P. Ririnui is another of the big forwards of the game, and weighs 15.10. He first attracted notice in the 1937 season, when he played for the East Coast [sic] rugby team against the Springboks, and the latter were of the opinion that Ririnui was one of the greatest forwards they played against in New Zealand. He came to Auckland last year to join the Manukau league team. Ririnui's progress in league has been slow but sure, but his honest play and ability to use his great strength has been realised by all who have played against him. He is a good player in the loose, but on Saturday he showed a tendency to mishandle”. The Auckland Star also wrote a piece on the support of Ririnui and Hawea Mataira by a group of Māori supporters who had traveled to the inter-island match. They were “led by 17st deep voiced Syd Kereopa, former Manukau rugby stalwart, they gave a concerted road of encouragement when Mataira or Ririnui came into the picture. “Ngāi Te Rangi” they shouted when Ririnui got the ball and dashed away breaking through all opposition to score a great try and nobly enhance the “mana” of his tribe. The Ngāi Te Rangi of Tauranga, of whom Ririnui is a member are a sub-tribe of the Arawa. Mataira, too, played a great game, and the cheers for the Kahungunu were as frequent as those for Ngāi Te Rangi.

Before departing New Zealand Ririnui played two further games for Manukau in the Fox Memorial championship. On July 15 Manukau lost to Mount Albert 21–19 in the main match at Carlaw Park with Ririnui “outstanding in the Manukau forwards”. Ririnui then travelled down to Tauranga to visit his family before returning to Auckland. The Bay of Plenty Times wrote “Mr. Peter Ririnui, the former Rangataua footballer, who has been chosen as a member of the league team to tour Great Britain, has been spending a few days with relatives here. He left yesterday on his return to Auckland and was farewelled at the Tauranga station by a large assembly of local natives”.

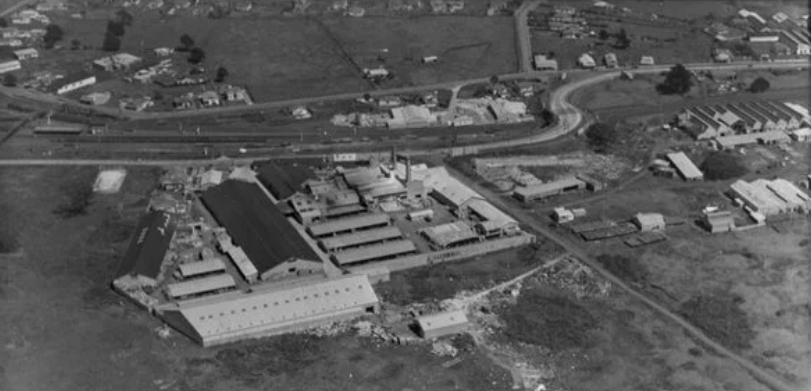
The New Zealand Glass Works in Penrose, Auckland in 1938

On the evening of Thursday, July 20 a function was held in Penrose at the Penrose Hall to farewell Ririnui, Jack Hemi, Tommy Chase, and Verdun Scott, who were all employees of the New Zealand Glass Manufacturers Company Proprietary Limited. Each of the players was presented with a woollen travelling rug bearing the players’ initials. The manager of the company Mr. W. Kearns said that the inclusion of four employees of one firm in a New Zealand side must be a record for the Dominion. Ririnui then played on July 22 against Richmond and scored a try in a 23–14 win. Early in the match “Ririnui and [Tommy] Chase were associated in a good passing bout, from which [Freddie] McGuire scored”. Soon after he “was again a tower of strength and penetrated deeply for [Jack] Brodrick to score at the corner”. Then after halftime Ririnui scored his try. The Herald added that “Ririnui was the outstanding forward and played easily his best game this season. Ririnui is in splendid form to commence the English tour”. In a piece in the Gisborne Herald publishing the New Zealand players weights, heights and occupation it was noted that Ririnui was 23 years of age, 6ft 1in, 16st, and a labourer”. He was in fact 26 years of age at the time, three months short of his 27th birthday.

On July 31 a piece was published in the Bay of Plenty Beacon, written by John G. McLean, the older brother of T.P. McLean. It was titled “Peter Ririnui – Auckland Writer's Comment – Great Game At Gisborne” and said “Orman, Mitchell, Chase, Hemi, and Ririnui are others among the league tourists who were in the rugby limelight before they saw the light and were “converted”. I take particular interest in Peter Ririnui because I fancy my unrestrained enthusiasm for the big fellow's play against the Springboks, at Gisborne in 1937, may have had some slight bearing on the overtures subsequently made to him to play league. After singing Ririnui's praises in a radio talk after the Gisborne match, I received a number of grateful letters from his Bay of Plenty admirers, one of whom told me he (Ririnui) had played representative football at 14 [this was likely incorrect as he debuted in the seniors aged 17 and made his representative debut the same season]. Whether or not this is pure legend I do not know.... “I am sorry to cast doubt on the story that Philip Nel cited Ririnui as the best forward in New Zealand, but I do not believe he hid everything of the sort. Nel was not given to fulsome praise of anyone, particularly on short acquaintance, and further more the Springboks could not tell one from another among the several Maoris in the Combined team's pack. Far from bestowing any great praise on any of their opponents in that game they were highly aggrieved by the offside tactics of the Maori forwards, who dwelt round the edges of the scrum and undoubtedly stood yards offside at times. “But there is no question about the magnificent game that Ririnui played that day. A huge, massive figure, he broke away repeatedly, and it sometimes took two men to pull him down. From what I hear he has never been quite as spectacular since but with his weight and strength he should be an asset to the league team”.

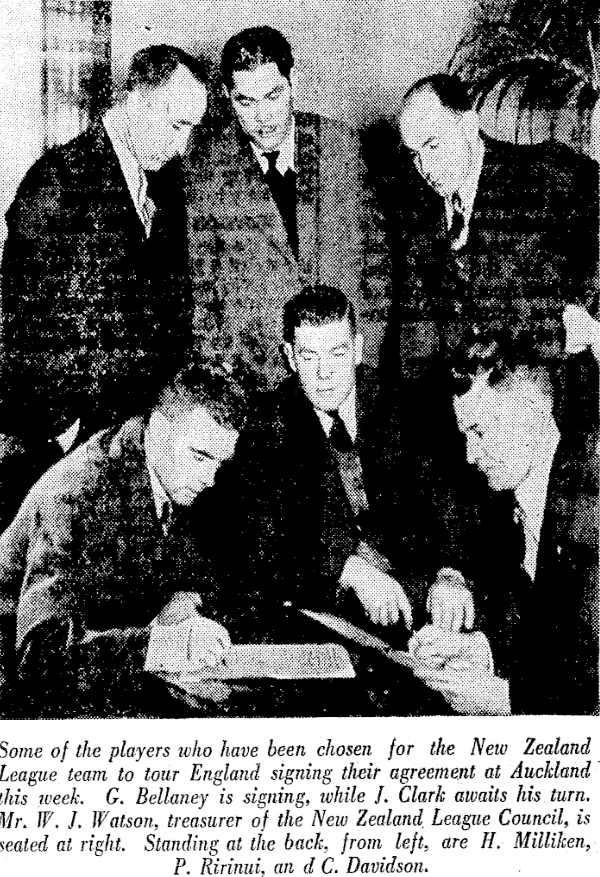
Ririnui about to sign an agreement for the New Zealand tour of England.

Prior to the tour portrait photographs of Ririnui were published in several North Island newspapers and the Evening Post published a photograph of Ririnui and other players signing official tour paperwork. On 26 July the Auckland members were farewelled at Auckland Train Station by family and supporters as they departed for Wellington.

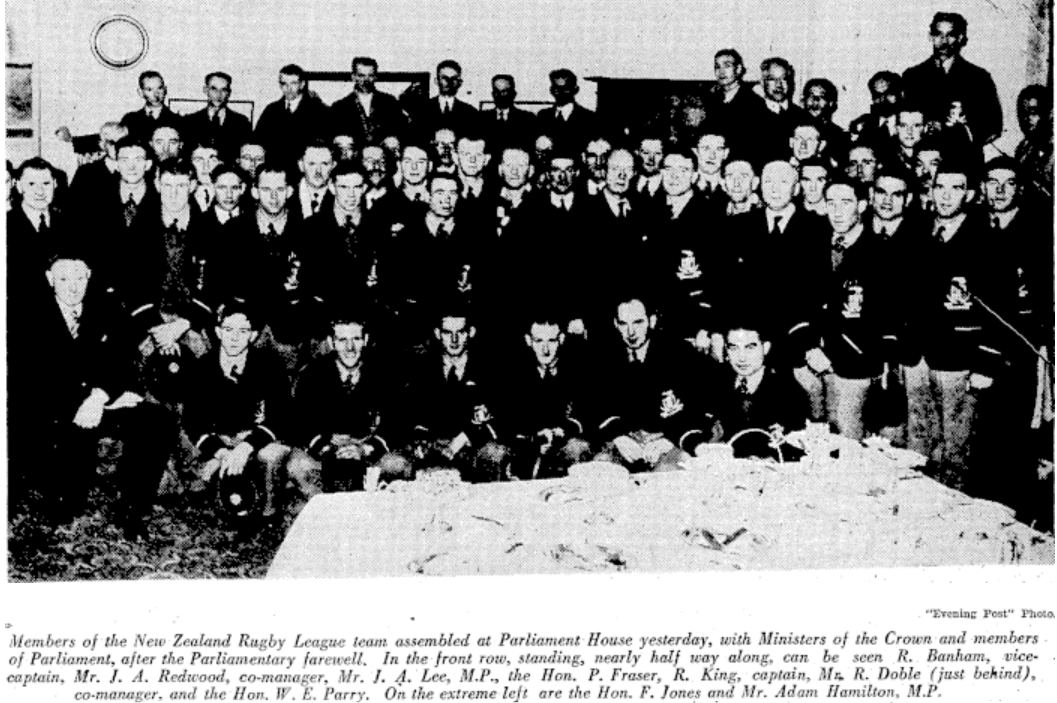
The New Zealand team at a farewell function held in the Parliament Buildings.

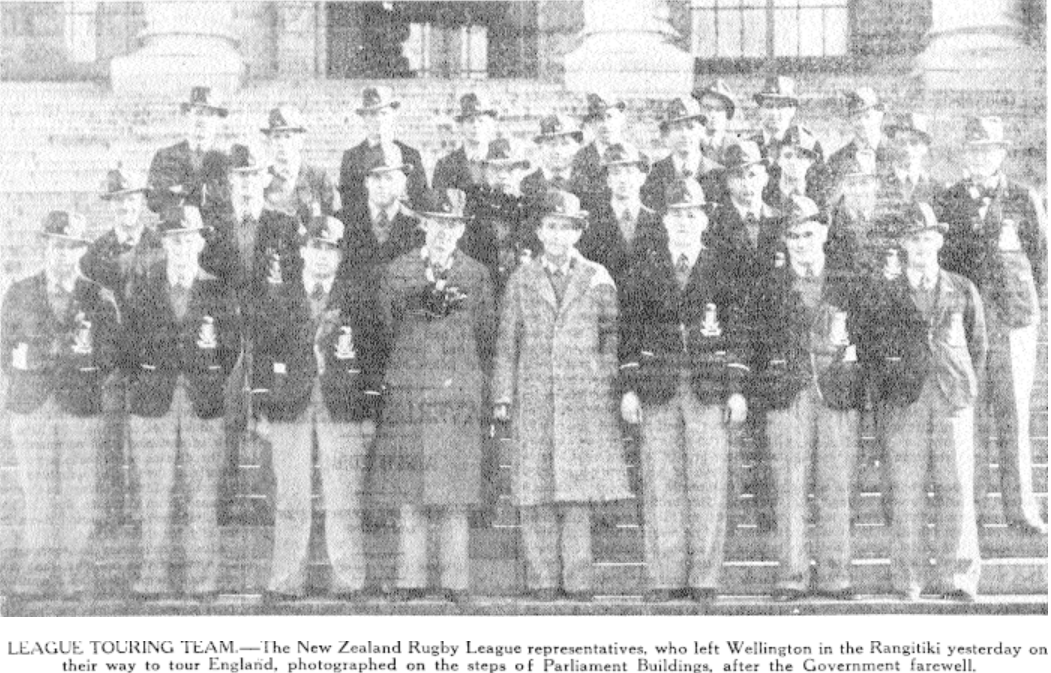
The New Zealand side on the steps of Parliament following their farewell function.

On the morning of the 27th the team and management attended a morning tea in the Parliament Buildings with "good wishes extended to the Kiwis, by Deputy-Prime Minister, the Hon. Peter Fraser, who expressed hope that they would have a successful tour".

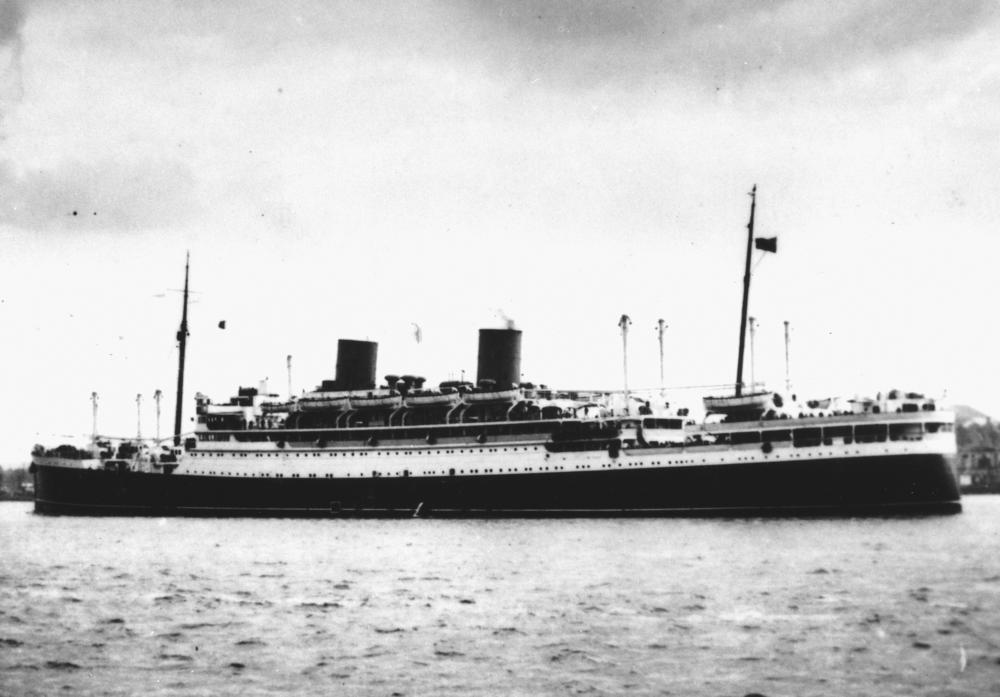
StateLibQld 1 170635 Rangitiki (ship)

The team departed Wellington for London on board the RMS Rangitiki in Tourist Class on Friday 28 July.

After departing for the tour a letter was received from manager Mr. R. Doble, one of the managers when they were a few days from arriving. Whilst on board the ship a fancy dress ball was held with “first prize being secured by the “Dronne Quintuplets” (Milliken, Jones, Scott, Clark, and Davison, with Banham was doctor, and Mr. Doble as nurse. Orman, and Ririnui as Robinson Crusoe and Friday secured second prize”. Doble added that “the past few days have been a worrying time for all on board owing to the war scare”. Mr. Doble added “the ship received orders to communicate with no one and all ports have been blackened and a black out occurs after sunset. We all felt safer on reaching the mouth of the Thames”.

After arriving New Zealand's opening game was played against St Helens on September 2. Ririnui played in the second row with Ross Jones.

After the side arrived back in New Zealand the Bay of Plenty Times published an article about the aborted tour. It was titled “Peter Ririnui Chants Challenge”. It detailed how Harry Sunderland has spent 18 pounds 10 shillings on touring the team around Blackpool, Wigan, and Oldham, “where they sang their Maori songs, and when, for the last time, their war cry was given in the main street in Oldham, outside the “Friendship Inn” of Jimmy Parkinson”. With the team were Charlie Seeling and George Smith, members of the original “All Blacks” in 1905, and of Baskerville's rugby league pioneers in 1907, who had both been living in England for a long time. He went on to say “when Peter Ririnui, the big Maori second row forward, chanted the opening challenge in the war cry in that Oldham street, Seeling and Smith were ready”.

==== 1940 Manukau and Auckland Māori ====
In 1940 Ririnui returned to his Manukau club side to resume his rugby league career. He played 22 games for them and scored seven tries. He was also selected for three Auckland Māori games.

Ririnui played his first match for Manukau against City Rovers on 6 April, scoring two tries in a 16–13 victory. Contemporary newspaper reports praised his performance, particularly his attacking runs.[306] In the following preliminary match, Manukau lost 15–12 to Mount Albert. Despite the defeat, Ririnui received favourable assessments from both the Auckland Star and the New Zealand Herald.[307][308]

The Fox Memorial championship began on 20 April, with Manukau defeating City 11–2. A contemporary report praised Ririnui’s play in the match.[309] He was also mentioned in reports of Manukau’s 23–7 win over Mount Albert,[310] 30–17 loss to Marist[311] and 15–4 win over Ponsonby.[312]

===== Auckland Māori selection =====
Ririnui was selected for the Auckland Māori side to play against South Auckland (Waikato) at Davies Park in Huntly on May 26. Ernie Asher was managing the side with the bus leaving the Auckland Post Office at 11am, and stopping at the Onehunga Post Office at 11:30 to pick up the players from that area before progressing to Huntly. Auckland Māori lost the match 22–20 on a heavy ground after rain, after having trailed 14–0 at halftime. For the Māori team Hawea Mataira and Ririnui “were always in the picture in the loser's forwards”. He was then chosen in the Auckland Māori side for their now annual game(s) against Auckland Pākehā, to be played on June 8 for the Carlaw Memorial Trophy. He was named in the second row with George Mitchell who ironically was not Māori, having an English father and Samoan mother. They were opposed in the Pākehā second row by Harold Milliken (Papakura) and Leo Davis (Richmond). The Herald wrote of the Maori side that “a heavy and virile pack has been chosen, in which H. Mataira and Ririnui should prove dominant figures”. Before a crowd of 6,000 at Carlaw Park the Pākehā side became the first ever team to win the Carlaw Memorial Trophy with a 10–7 victory. The conditions were good with fine weather and a surface not as heavy as anticipated. The Māori team was unlucky, losing Jack Hemi, and Joe Broughton to injury in the first half and then Bruce Donaldson in the second half. In the first half halfback Wilfred Brimble “started a movement in which Dave Solomon and Tommy Chase showed excellent initiative. Ririnui, who raced up to support the pair, got over, but was called back for a forward pass”. After the game the Herald wrote that “Mitchell and Ririnui were the pick of the forwards”.

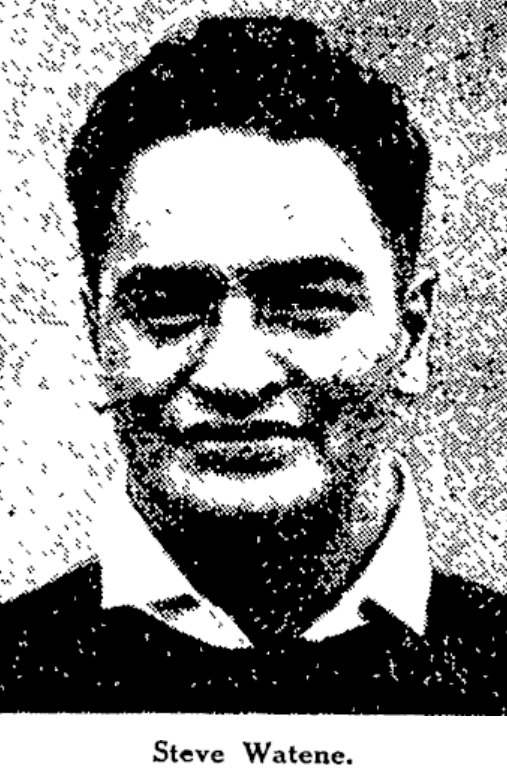
Puti Tipene Watene, the captain of the Manukau side who had a heavy involvement in Ririnui's rugby league career.

Ririnui returned to Manukau for their 25–16 win over Papakura on June 15 at Waikaraka Park in Onehunga. He scored a try the following week when Manukau beat Newton 14 to 8 at Carlaw Park before 5,000 spectators. Manukau captain Steve Watene stood out and was well supported by Ririnui, Freddie McGuire, and Jack Brodrick. They then played North Shore on June 29 in the final match of the first round. The winner would claim the Rukutai Shield for the leading team from the first round, with North Shore winning 12-7. There was a large crowd of 9,000 present, with the Herald reporting that “Brodrick, Ririnui, and Shilton ... showed up among the forwards” along with standout Watene.

Manukau had an 18–12 win over City in round 10. The Auckland Star wrote a short piece titled “Crash Methods” which said “Peter Ririnui was prominent with crash methods playing for Manukau against City. He gave a virile display, deviated not one inch from the straight path, and gave tacklers the full benefit of his useful weight of 16.0. But good City low tackling toppled the massive Ririnui over. There were occasions when a timely pass might have served his side better”. The Manukau backs were fine on attack at times and “quick to promote an attack or assist in the completion of the backs’ efforts were Ririnui, Brodrick, and Watene, who were the leading forwards”. They lost to Mt Albert 19–5 on July 13 with the Auckland Star saying “Manukau had a big advantage with players of the dreadnought type in Ririnui, Marsh, and Watene”. He and Marsh were absent from their 20–10 loss to Marist on July 20, and it is likely he also did not play against South Auckland on July 21 for Auckland Māori, and for Manukau in their July 27 match with Richmond.

Ririnui returned to the Manukau side for their 22–17 loss to Ponsonby on August 3 and “played a fine game”. They then had a bye but played Huntly in a friendly match at Waikaraka Park in Onehunga on August 10. They lost once more 23 to 13 though “Watene and Ririnui played good games among the forwards”. Manukau had a 29–10 win over Newton in round 16 of the championship with Ririnui scoring one of their seven tries and playing “a dashing game”.

===== Auckland Māori v Auckland Pākehā =====
The following week Manukau defeated North Shore 13–7 before a crowd of 4,000 at Carlaw Park. Ririnui, Shilton, and Marsh “were the most prominent forwards”. Ririnui was then named in the Auckland Māori side to play a ‘return’ match against Auckland Pākehā on August 31. He was named in the second row with George Mitchell (Richmond) once more. They were opposed in the Pakeha second row by Harold Milliken (Papakura) and Joseph Gunning (Mt Albert). The game was in aid of the injured players’ fund with 5,000 attending the match. Auckland Pākehā won the match by 27 points to 6. In the second half Hawea Mataira and Ririnui “headed a rush”, but it was stopped by Claude Dempsey. Ririnui and Mitchell were said to have “stood out prominently” but were over shadowed by Milliken who was the best forward on the ground.

He next played for Manukau in round 2 of the Roope Rooster knockout competition. Manukau suffered an upset 25–21 loss to Papakura and Ririnui was sent off near the end of the game in a match played in a “spirited fashion”. Prior to that he was reported to have played a “good game”. They then drew with Marist 10–10 in round 2 of the Phelan Shield knockout competition before beating them 23–9 in a replay a week later on September 28. Ririnui scored a try in a 27–16 victory over City in the semi final on October 5 and played a “fine game”. Manukau played Mt Albert in the final on October 12 and won 20 to 14 with Ririnui scoring one of their four tries. The Herald said that “Ririnui occasionally deserted the pack to play in the backs, and he was responsible for opening up some dangerous movements”.

Ririnui concluded his season for Manukau with a rugby union match against a Tauranga Māori side at the Tauranga Domain on October 19. Apparently the Manukau side had the choice of playing a game in Rotorua or Tauranga and chose the later. The Bay of Plenty Times wrote “among those who will show their paces are [Tommy] Chase, [Jack] Brodrick, P. Ririnui, and [Jack] Hemi”. The Tauranga Māori side featured many of Ririnui's relatives and former teammates including Pio Ririnui, and S. Ririnui. Manukau won 18 to 13 after Tauranga led 5–0 with the Manukau players taking a while to settle into rugby union rules as many of them had not played it for some time. The Bay of Plenty Times wrote that “P. Ririnui, the former Rangataua player, and a member of the last All Black [Kiwi] team to visit England, opened play for Manukau, and supported by [Freddie] McGuire transferred the ball well into the Tauranga half”. McGuire scored soon after. Ririnui then scored for the third game in succession after he “bustled for Manukau to put them in the lead” with Jack Hemi’s conversion putting them 10–5 up at halftime.

==== 1941 (Manukau and Auckland Māori) ====
In 1941 Ririnui played 21 games for Manukau and scored six tries, while he also played for Auckland Māori once more, this time in a solitary match against South Auckland. With World War Two in full swing there were very few representative fixtures being played. He missed Manukau's opening match of the season, a preliminary match against Richmond on April 19, with the Auckland Star reporting that “although Peter Ririnui did not play today, he is expected to assist Manukau” this season. He debuted the following week in a second preliminary round match which they won 38–10 against Newton. He scored a try which came in a bright start that saw Ririnui score one and Muri two within ten minutes of the beginning. Ririnui played a “fine game” and his “speed paved the way for many tries”.

Manukau's first Fox Memorial championship game was on May 3 against North Shore. Manukau lost 17 to 4. Early in the second half the Shore winger, J Greenwood got through the Manukau three-quarters but was stopped by Ririnui who had dropped back as an extra fullback. During the second half “Ririnui was still trying to find a way through with shock tactics...”. Later on Lipscombe on the wing for Manukau made a run and passed infield to Ririnui who “with a series of crash runs” tried to break through the Shore defence but without luck. The Auckland Star wrote a short piece titled “Ririnui Plays Well” but the text of it is illegible in the Papers Past website. He played in a 10–7 loss to Ponsonby before scoring a try against Marist in an easy 34–3 win on May 24.

===== Auckland Māori v South Auckland (Waikato) =====
Ririnui was selected for the Auckland Māori team in their opening fixture of the season, against South Auckland (Waikato) on June 2. The Auckland Māori side lost 23–12 with Ririnui scoring a try. He was one of the best Maori forwards along with W. Mataira, and Frank Hilton. He returned to his Manukau side for a round 5 win over City by 11 points to 5. At one stage Joe Broughton and Ralph Martin in the Manukau backs made ground and “a long reverse pass gave Ririnui an open road. However, he dropped his pass when the way ahead was clear”. Manukau beat Papakura on June 14 by 43 points to 8 and then had a 16–5 win over Newton a week later in round 7. Prior to the game the Auckland Star wrote that Manukau “has the heaviest forwards in the competition, exceptionally weighty players in Marsh, Ririnui, and Watene, and good supporting players in [Wiremu] Te Tai, [George] Shilton, and W. Martin”. He then scored a try in another win, this time over Mount Albert by 14 to 5 in round 8. It came when Tommy Chase “with a brilliant side-step... weaved his way through the Mount Albert team, and gave a final pass to send Ririnui in to score”.

Ririnui was then selected for the Auckland team to play South Auckland (Waikato) on July 12 at Carlaw Park. He was said to have shown “good form this season” along with fellow New Zealand representatives Bert Leatherbarrow (hooker), George Mitchell (second row), and Hawea Mataira (prop). Despite being listed in the team right up until the day prior to the match Ririnui did not get selected in the side to play. This was because he had been unable to attend the Thursday training session at 5pm. He was replaced in the starting side by Richard (Dick) Shadbolt, the experienced Mount Albert prop but maintained a place in the reserves along with Bruce Graham. Ririnui was not required to take the field and Auckland won 25–14 before a crowd of 9,500. The Auckland Star wrote a short article titled “Why Chosen League Reps. Did Not Play” which stated “Chosen players must practise”, said the chairman of the Auckland Rugby League Board of Control, Mr. G. Grey Campbell, in referring to changes in the Auckland team which was selected to play against South Auckland last Saturday. In the original selection was Brian Riley, of Ponsonby, at wing three-quarters, and P. Ririnui, of Manukau, in the forwards. They were replaced when the match was played by Jack Smith, of North Shore, and R. Shadbolt of Mount Albert. Mr. Campbell said that Ririnui sent word that he was unable to attend the two practices held during the week, and the selectors therefore had to leave him out...”.

Ririnui returned to his Manukau side for a round 9 match with Richmond which they lost narrowly 9-7. Manukau then beat North Shore 22 to 7 with a 7,000 strong crowd at Carlaw Park watching which was a record for the club season. Ririnui, Watene, and W. Martin in the Manukau forwards were the most prominent and they “were of great assistance to their backs in the loose, and scrummaged with determination and success”. In an 18–5 victory over Ponsonby in the feature game at Carlaw Park on July 26 “Ririnui battled hard in the forwards...”. However the Manukau backs were playing well individually but not as a group though “there was one bright exception when Ririnui got a pass away to Watene, to [Joe] Murray, to [Tommy] Chase, and then to [Tom] Butler, who crossed...”. The Herad said that Ririnui was “outstanding” along with Watene and [George] Shilton. They then thrashed Marist by 45 points to 3 on August 2, with Ririnui, Wiremu Te Tai, and George Shilton “the pick of the forwards”. Another win followed when they defeated City by 7 points to 2 in round 13. On one occasion a “fine effort” was started by Chase and “Ririnui, Watene, Hemi, and Murray showed excellent understanding”. The Herald said that he “played his best game this season”. The Auckland Star's match report said that Ririnui and Watene were “throwing long passes to get their backs on the move”. In the second half Tommy Chase “cut through, and passed to Ririnui who had broken clear. The big Manukau forward whipped the ball on to Murray, who had a clear run to score between the posts” for the only try of the game.

On August 16 when Manukau had a bye they travelled to Te Kohanga to play a charitable match with a Māori team from Kohanga. The game was to assist (Princess) Te Puea Hērangi in raising money for the Maori Red Cross Funds. Following the match a dance was held at the Te Kohanga Hall with music supplied by the T.P.M. orchestra from Ngaruawahia. Manukau won the match 37 points to 6 and £56 were raised. They then returned to the Auckland club championship and beat Richmond 15–8 in a round 15 match. Early in the game in “ideal conditions” “Ririnui broke clear from ruck play and charged down the centre but there was a delayed pass when the Manukau backs had come into supporting position”. Soon after Manukau opened the scoring when “Ririnui passed to Hemi and the latter went straight through the Richmond inside backs, with Murray in support. Hemi went right in to [Jack] Magill, the Richmond fullback, and then passed to send Murray in between the posts”. The Herald said that he “played a good game”. They had yet another win, their sixth in a row, against Papakura by 43 points to 2 on the Carlaw Park number 2 field. Midway through the second half “from a scrum near the Papakura line Ririnui secured and sent Murray over for Hemi to convert”. The Herald wrote “among the forwards, [Wiremu] Te Tai, Ririnui, [Aubrey] Thompson, and Watene gave the backs excellent support in some clever passing movements...”.

He was chosen in a 21-man Auckland Māori squad to play Auckland Pākehā on September 20. He had missed selection for the Auckland team to play South Auckland (Waikato) on September 6 and was not named in the Manukau team which played Newton on the same day. He was available the following weekend however for Manukau's final round match with Mount Albert. Manukau won 33 to 18 with Ririnui scoring a try. Manukau needed a win and a North Shore loss to claim the championship but North Shore beat Newton 19–9 to win the Fox Memorial Shield by a solitary point over Manukau who has won 13 games and lost just 3. Rinirnui's try was Manukau's first and came when Steve Watene “ran strongly, and in passed as Jack Hemi ranged up into position. The next pass found Ririnui and the big Manukau forward had an open road to score by the posts”. They led 17–10 at halftime and then began to play “carefree football, with Watene and Ririnui ready to throw long passes as they broke into open play”. The Herald said that “outstanding tactics were shown by Watene and Ririnui. The pair were responsible for most of the tries scored”. On September 17 the Auckland Māori squad was named for the match with Auckland Pākehā three days later but there were nine forwards listed and Ririnui ultimately did not play. A day before the match he was still listed in the group of available forwards but ultimately he did not play in the match.

Ririnui concluded the season with four matched for Manukau. They beat Newton 52–2 in Round 2 of the Roope Rooster knockout competition on September 27, and then a 20–11 win over City in the semi finals. He was one of “the best” Manukau forwards. He scored a try for Manukau in their 28–10 win over Ponsonby in the final to claim their second ever Roope Rooster title. He was “prominent in the loose” along with Aubrey Thompson. His final game came in the Stormont Shield deciding match where Manukau was up against North Shore as the two major trophy winners for the season. A crowd of 12,000 filled Carlaw Park with Manukau running out comfortable winners by 30 points to 10. He scored one of their tries and “played well among the forwards” once more.

==== 1942 Manukau, Auckland Māori, Auckland, and Auckland Māori XIII ====
In 1942 Ririnui played 18 games for Manukau, and he also played representative games for Auckland Māori (2), and Auckland (1), as well as an unofficial representative game for an Auckland Māori XIII against an All Golds side.

His first game was a preliminary round win over Richmond by 25 points to 8 on May 2. With the war midway through the newspapers were often covering very little of the sporting activities including rugby league. Manukau played games against City-Otahuhu, Marist-North Shore, Richmond, Newton-MtAlbert, Ponsonby, City-Otahuhu, Marist-North Shore, Richmond, and then Newton-Mt Albert. No team lineups were published and very few details were reported apart from the scorers and some basic comments on the play. The first mention of Ririnui was in Manukau's 23–12 win over the combined Newton-Mt Albert side on July 4. He scored one of their five tries and was “prominent among the forwards” along with Aubrey Thompson and Wiremu Te Tai. He was selected for the Auckland representative side for their match with South Auckland (Waikato) on July 11. He was to play which meant it was his first game for that side since 1938. Ririnui was initially named in the forward reserves along with Walter Findlater, with Hawea Mataira, Maurice Quirke, and Norm Johnson the starting front row. However Mataira was unable to play and Ririnui took his place. Auckland won easily by 46 points to 16 at Carlaw Park with Leo Davis, Ririnui, Aubrey Thompson, and Johnson playing “well among the forwards”. Manukau had a 11–6 loss to Ponsonby on July 18 in round 10, before a 15–5 win over the combined Marist-North Shore team a week later. Manukau then beat the third of the combined teams, City-Otahuhu in round 12 to all but seal the Fox Memorial championship. They had a four-point lead over the same side with just three games remaining. Ririnui was “outstanding” in the Manukau forward pack. Manukau officially won the title a week later when they beat Richmond 19-3 and City-Otahuhu lost to Ponsonby. More wins came in their final two games when they beat Newton-Mt Albert 27-8, and Ponsonby 28-2. Ririnui and Watene “did splendid work in the loose”.

Ririnui was selected in the Auckland Māori squad to play Auckland Pākehā on August 29. There were eight forwards named and Ririnui was among those chosen to play on match day. Before one of “the largest attendances of the season” the Māori team won 10 to 8. Aubrey Thompson played well in the loose “where he had useful support from Ririnui and [George] Shilton”. In the first half “a splendid mack movement, well supported by Ririnui and Thompson, gave the Maoris a lead and the half-time score was 5 points to 3”. The New Zealand Herald wrote that “Ririnui was the outstanding forward”.

Ririnui returned to Manukau for a 14–2 defeat to Marist-North Shore in the Roope Rooster knocking them out of the competition. They however had arranged for a visit to Wellington to play against the Wellington representative side at the Basin Reserve on September 12. Ririnui was among those included to make the trip along with Tommy Chase, Steve Watene, Joe Murray, and Jack Hemi with the Dominion newspaper saying “Manukau is virtually a New Zealand Maori team”. Ultimately the Manukau team also included former New Zealand and New Zealand Māori representative Jack Brodrick making a rare appearance, and other representative players such as Tom Butler, Jack Major, and George Shilton. Manukau ran out winners by 23 points to 17 in slippery conditions following rain but in brilliant Saturday weather. The Manukau side had travelling by train all night to get there. The crowd was said to have been the largest to attend a rugby league game in Wellington for many years and it was a “bright” game. He missed Manukau's final game of the season which was their Stormont Shield win over Richmond on September 26.

Ririnui was however to play two more matches this season. The first was for Auckland Māori in their second meeting of the year. The game was at Carlaw Park on October 5. He was selected in an 18-man squad initially. The match was drawn 23–23 after the Māori side led 15–10 at halftime. In the second half the Pākehā forwards “did splendid work in the loose...” and brilliant play by their backs saw them take a lead. Then near the end “a brilliant effort by Watene, Mataira, and Ririnui resulted in [George] Shilton scoring” to put them back in the lead before Dick Hull drew the game with a try. Throughout the game Ririnui was “prominent”. Then on October 17 a Māori XIII side was named to play a team named the “All Golds” at Western Springs. The All Golds team was essentially the M.T.P (Military Transport Pool) side which had won the Gallaher Shield (the Auckland Rugby Union major trophy). As the team was made up almost entirely of rugby league players (with several Kiwis) they formed an unofficial team to play a Māori side. The Māori team was made up largely of the Auckland Māori side. The match was not being played under the auspices of the Auckland Rugby League. The All Golds side won the match 18 to 9 after Jack Hemi missed all three conversion attempts and two penalties.

==== 1943 Manukau ====
Ririnui began the 1943 season, which was his sixth for Manukau on May 15, after not playing in their first three matches. He ultimately only played 10 games scoring one try. His appearances were intermittent and he didn't play in any representative games for the first time in his rugby league career. On May 15 Ririnui and Joe Cootes played their debut games for the season with Ririnui reportedly now weighing 17 stone. The Auckland Star wrote that “the pair made the Manukau pack formidable in the set scrums, and too heavy for the Otahuhu six”. Manukau beat Newton 13–0 on May 22 in round 4, and then beat Marist 10–5 in round 6 with their “much heavier” forward pack. Ririnui played in wins over City, Mt Albert, and Ponsonby, before missing games against North Shore, Richmond, and Otahuhu. He returned for their 11–5 win against Newton on July 24 with the Auckland Star writing “P. Ririnui, the heavy-weight forward, turned out, and was prominent in the Manukau pack”. He also scored one of their three tries.

Manukau won three more games and had secured their second consecutive Fox memorial championship though Ririnui did not appear in any of them. He did however play in their final round loss to Richmond by 10 to 5 on August 28. He missed their two Roope Rooster matches but turned out for their Roope Rooster final against Ponsonby on September 25. Manukau won 21 to 9 with Ririnui “prominent in the loose”. Manukau's last game against Auckland opponents was in the Stormont Shield final against City on October 2. Manukau was going for the rare feat of winning all three major trophies in one season. They were to become just the 2nd side to do it following Richmond Rovers winning all three in 1934. Manukau went one better as they had also won the Rukutai Shield for leading the championship after the first round. In a preview of the game the Auckland Star said “should Manukau field their big men, Ririnui (who gave a great display last Saturday), Watene, Shilton, Te Tai, and the impressive Rogers, the chances strongly favour the Maori team”. They defeated City 12 to 9 at Carlaw Park after the scores had been tied 0–0 at half time. Manukau did indeed field Ririnui and Watene, their “17-stone pair”. The game was played in wet weather before a “fair attendance” with Manukau not winning until the final minute when Jack Hemi scored. Ririnui “played splendidly” in the forwards.

Manukau and Ririnui's last game of the season was against the Blackball side from the West Coast of the South Island. They had won the championship there and travelled to Auckland to play the Auckland champions on October 16. They had also beaten Sydenham, the Christchurch champions 43 to 6 and the Wellington champions, Petone, by 34 points to 7. The South Island selector Jim Amos said they were the best club side he had ever seen. With such a strong side visiting Manukau decided to field their “heavyweight pack” with Ririnui amongst them. Manukau won the game 23 to 9 before an enormous crowd of 17,000 at Carlaw Park. Ririnui “was prominent at times for hard running. The Blackball players found him very difficult to handle. In one run that paved the way for a Manukau score, Ririnui simply brushed all high tackling aside and got close to the Blackball try-line before he sent the ball on to a support”. The Greymouth Evening Star wrote that Blackball had “stood off and would not tackle the giant Maori forward Ririnui”. Blackball had dominated the first 10 minutes but then “Manukau got relief in a break-through by Ririnui, [Joe] Murray scored for the home team”. In a match report the Grey River Argus wrote “the big Ririnui raced away from a ruck for Manukau but Nuttall cleared”. After Ces Mountford made a “fine run” for Blackball, Manukau replied with “a forward breakaway by [Aubrey] Thompson and Ririnui...”. Later Thompson passed to Ririnui and “the powerful forward raced down inside of the touch and he handed to Watene, who veered infield and timed a pass that enabled the winger, Taumata, to score at the corner”.

==== 1944 Manukau, Auckland Māori ====
Ririnui once again turned out for Manukau in the 1944 season, playing 10 games for them. He also played one game for Auckland Māori. It was reported on May 4 that his nephew, W.L. Werohia was trying to join the Manukau side. There had been some confusion as Werohia had registered with the Newton Rangers club as he reportedly thought that Ririnui would be playing for them as he was supposedly going to join Newton if Steve Watene joined them. However Ririnui was staying with Manukau and Werohia then wished to join him there. Ririnui didn't in fact take the field for Manukau until their round 3 match against City. Manukau won 12–11 with Ririnui “prominent among the forwards”. There was little coverage of games after this with no mention of Ririnui in most of Manukau's games against Ponsonby, Richmond, Newton, Marist, Mt Albert, and Pt Chevalier. Though in the 2–0 win over Richmond on May 27 on “heavy grounds” he was said to have “found the difficult going too much of a problem”.

On July 1 in round 10 Ririnui scored a try against North Shore on their field at the Devonport Domain. Manukau won 30 to 5. Manukau beat Otahuhu 5-4, City by default, and then drew “an exciting game” with Ponsonby 6–6 in round 13. In the game against Ponsonby the New Zealand Herald wrote that “a feature of the game was the high standard of forward play, Shilton, Ririnui, and [Ranginui] Ewe were excellent in the loose”. Manukau lost the following weekend to Richmond on July 29 by 15 points to 14 with Ririnui and Wiremu Te Tai giving “excellent support” to Shilton. They had a 29–10 win against Newton in round 15 which put them into first place in the championship. However they suffered a 12–0 upset loss to Marist which meant there was now a three team tie for first between themselves, City, and Mt Albert. Their round 17 game was against Pt Chevalier at Onehunga Primary School with Manukau winning 21-13. In their forwards Ririnui and Jack Brodrick, who was making a rare appearance were “mainstays”. Their most important game of the championship followed when they met Mt Albert in the final round. Both teams along with City were tied for first, but Manukau lost a close game 10-7 which meant they finished third and Mt Albert and City (who also won) would play off for the 1944 Fox Memorial championship.

===== Auckland Māori v Auckland Pākehā =====
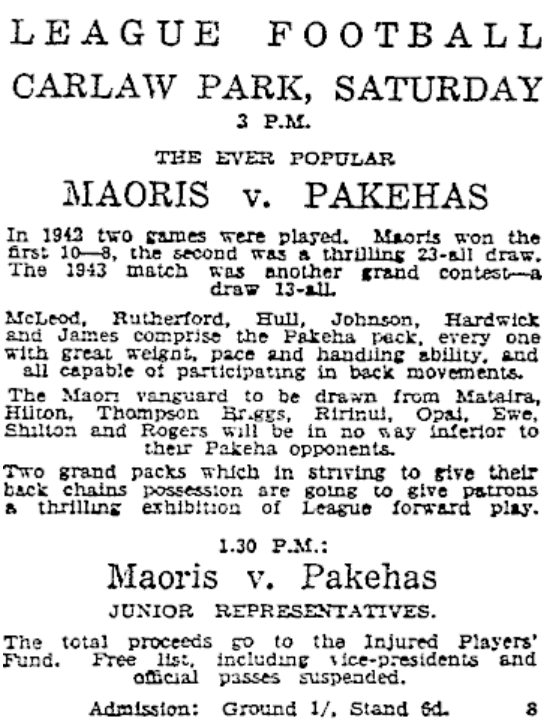

Following the end of the championship the Auckland Māori and Auckland Pākehā representative teams were selected with Ririnui chosen for the former side for the 10th time in his career. Initially the squad included nine forwards. The day before the match the Māori side was finalised with a front row of Hawea Mataira, Wiremu Te Tai, and Ririnui named. The Pākehā front row included Don McLeod, Jock Rutherford, and Dick Hull. An advertisement appeared for the game with Ririnui as one of the featured players. The game was raising money for the Injured Players Fund with £360 raised and Auckland Māori winning 18-13. For the Māori side Ririnui, [Frank] Hilton, and Rogers, “showed up well in the loose play”. In the first half Joe Murray at centre “made a fine opening, and Ririnui ran hard and straight. Rogers gave support, and Hilton scored”. After the game the New Zealand Herald said “among the forwards Ririnui was the best on the ground, and he was in every movement, besides assisting the backs in passing bouts”.

Ririnui's form saw him added to the North Island team to play the South Island for the following Saturday (September 16). He was brought in to replace Hawea Mataira who had notified the selectors that he was unable to play due to injuries. Ultimately however Ririnui did not play and was replaced by F. Andrews from Wellington. Ririnui's final game of the season came in Manukau's 18–8 loss to North Shore on September 30 in round 2 of the Roope Rooster knockout competition. In the first half he infringed giving North Shore an attacking scrum from which they scored. Towards the end of the game he made a break and the Manukau forwards took play the Shore end with Kenneth Finlayson passing to W.L. Werohia who scored.

==== 1945 Manukau, Auckland Māori, Auckland, and North Island ====
Ririnui had a busier season in 1945 when he played 14 matches for Manukau and scored two tries. He also played two matches for Auckland Māori, and two for Auckland, while he was selected and played for the North Island for the first time since 1939. His first game was in round 1 of the Fox Memorial championship and he scored two tries in a 35–9 win over North Shore. It was the first time he had scored two tries in a match since Manukau's round 1 win on April 6, 1940. His first try came just before halftime and Tommy Chase’s conversion gave them a 10–6 lead. His second try in the second half was converted by Tom Butler which extended the lead to 30-6. The Star also said he was one of the Manukau forwards to “work hard” along with George Shilton and A Rogers”. Ririnui did not play for Manukau the following weekend in a 31–5 victory over Newton.

He returned the next round when Manukau were defeated 17–15 by Mount Albert. With Manukau trailing 2-0 early in the game Tommy Chase “started a passing bout, and ... sent it on to Ririnui, who forced a gap in the defence, and Rogers raced over for a brilliant try”. Later in the half with Manukau leading 5-2, “good passing by Rogers and Ririnui saw Shilton race in to accept and score a fine try”. He was a standout a week later when Manukau beat City 21–13 in the feature game at Carlaw Park. The first points of the match came when the Manukau forwards “with the burly Ririnui in the lead, drove to the City end as soon as play began, and from a penalty Chase kicked a beautiful angle goal”. Early in the second half Manukau were throwing the ball around in the City end when “Ririnui carved a way through, and then passed to send “M. Thompson in wide” to cut City's lead to 10–7 with Chase's conversion. The New Zealand Herald wrote that the Manukau forwards, “led by Ririnui and Shilton, dominated the game” and they “excelled in the loose, Thompson, Ririnui, and [Wiremu] Te Tai doing effective work”. Manukau suffered a 20–8 loss to Otahuhu on May 12 “before a large attendance”. The Herald said that “time and again Ririnui led the Manukau forwards, but the Otahuhu defence was equal to the occasion”. Once again he “excelled among the forwards”.

==== Auckland Selection ====
Ririnui played in a 24–6 loss to Ponsonby and then a 13–9 loss to Marist before being selected in the Auckland team to play South Auckland on June 9. The selectors were Jack Kirwan, Dougie McGregor, and Jim Clark, with Ririnui chosen in the front row with J Borich the other prop and Jock Rutherford at hooker. Their front row opponents were Rod Dow, N. Healey, and Albert Hambleton who would be selected for New Zealand team in 1948. Auckland won easily at Carlaw Park by 46 points to 7 with the Auckland backs completely outplaying their opponents. Though the Auckland Star wrote “with Ririnui, 17st, Borich, 15st 4lb, and [Frank] Hilton, 14st 1lb, there was plenty of weight in the Auckland scrum to assist J. Rutherford in getting the ball”. The Herald said that “Ririnui was the most constructive forward and he was always looking for a supporting back”.

Ririnui returned to his Manukau side which was struggling and they lost to Richmond 10–7 on June 16 and 14–12 to Pt Chevalier at Walker Park on June 23. Prior to the later game he was named by Ernie Asher in the Auckland Māori squad to play Huntly District on Sunday, June 24 at Davies Park in Huntly. Auckland Māori won the game 16 to 14 in heavy rain which somewhat ruined “what promised to be a splendid display of the code”. Ririnui was said to have been the best forward on the ground. After the match a function was held to bestow life membership on Brownie Paki A day later he was chosen in the Auckland Māori team to play Auckland Pākehā the following Saturday on June 24 at Carlaw Park. He was initially chosen in an extended squad but when the final team was chosen he was picked in the second row with George Mitchell, with George Shilton at lock.

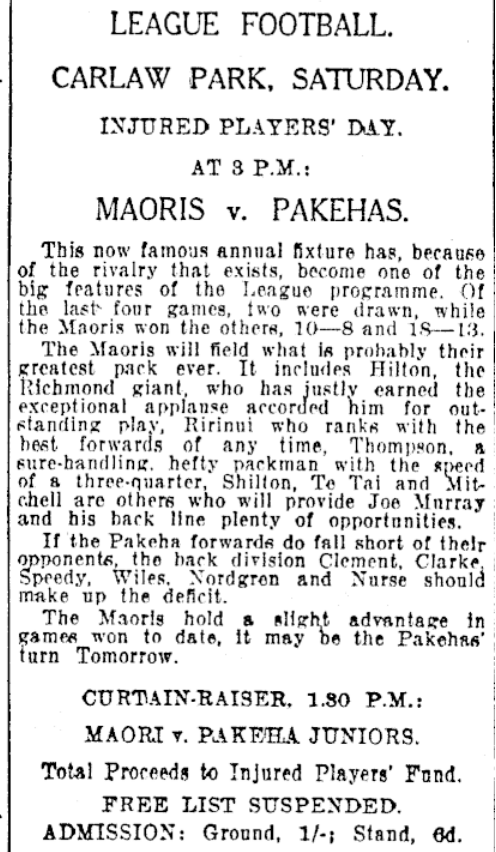

In an advertisement for the match it was that the Māori side includes “Ririnui who ranks with the best forwards of any time”. In a match described as “keen” the Auckland Pākehā team won 19 to 16 with Ririnui scoring one of their two tries. It was his third try for them in his 12th game. The largest crowd of the season watched the match which was played on a field that was in “fair order” after heavy rain with only a few muddy patches. With the game close towards the end and the Māori side outplaying their opponent hundreds of spectators rushed around to the # end of the field to watch from there. In the second half “Ririnui, Mitchell, and Thomson headed a determined Maori forward rush, which Roy Nurse checked just in time”. The Pākehā side stretched their lead to 17–2 in the second half but the Māori side mounted a furious comeback when “twice... Ririnui broke away by fending off opponents. He and the other Maori forwards rose to the occasion splendidly”. Soon after Mitchell dived over. Jack Silva kicked two penalty goals to narrow the score to 19-11, then Ririnui snapped up the ball close to the line “and crashed over for a great try”. However they could not cross for any more points and were defeated. After the game the New Zealand Herald said that “Ririnui stood out as the best forward on the ground”.

In an advertisement for the club games the following weekend the Auckland Rugby League wrote that “that great Maori effort over the last 20 minutes last Saturday was largely due to the outstanding play of Ririnui and [Joe] Murray, two of the finest players ever associated with the league code...”. Manukau were defeated 21–13 by Otahuhu Rovers on July 7 but then beat Ponsonby United on July 14 by 12 points to 11. After the later game he was named in the Auckland representative side to play Wellington on July 21. He was chosen in the second row with Manukau teammate Aubrey Thompson and Travers Hardwick at lock. However he did not play on match day and it was revealed later that he was dropped from the side for not attending practice. He was replaced in the side by Bruce Graham, the North Shore forward who would go on to represent New Zealand in 1946. The next weekend Manukau beat Mt Albert 13–12 on Carlaw Park 2.

Ririnui was “disciplined for not attending practice” with his dropping but was included in Auckland's next match on August 4 against West Coast who were visiting Auckland. He was back in the second row in place of Graham. In the West Coast second row were Ken Mountford and Charlie McBride who both played for New Zealand in 1946. Before a crowd of over 13,000 Auckland won a hard-fought match 8-7. In the first half Ririnui was involved in an attacking movement which he started which ultimately saw Bernard Lowther go close to scoring. West Coast led 7–0 at halftime before a Brian Nordgren try narrowed the score to 7-3. Soon after “excitement was intense as Thompson and Ririnui, well supported in the loose by [Des] Ryan and [Jock] Rutherford, swept over the West Coast backs”. A short time later Roy Nurse scored for Auckland with the score now 7-6. Ririnui and Thompson, “shone in some solid forward play in the West Coast twenty-five”. Then Ririnui “unluckily failed to gather in the ball within a yard of the line”. With the game getting to its later stages Travers Hardwick “broke away, [Aubrey] Thompson in-kicked and Ririnui, 17 stone forward, dropped McBride like a log after he had run into Ririnui. McBride had played a great game and was out [unconscious] for some time, but recovered to carry on” after leaving the field temporarily. The Grey River Argus said that “it was perfectly legal defensive play by Ririnui”. At the end of the game the Auckland Star wrote that Ririnui and Thompson “were a tower of strength...”. And that “the strenuous play of Ririnui and Thompson in the Auckland pack in the second spell was a deciding factor of the game”.

Ririnui returned to Manukau who continued their disappointing season with losses to Richmond 11–7 in round 13, and 8–0 to North Shore in round 14 which saw them finish 8th in the 10 team Fox Memorial championship. They were then knocked out of the Roope Rooster in the first round with an 18–15 loss to Mount Albert on September 1. The club's season finished at this point as they did not continue in the Phelan Shield consolation competition. The Auckland team to travel to Wellington to play the Wellington representative side was then named by Ririnui was not among them. The Herald wrote “it is difficult to understand the omission of P. Ririnui, who is one of the best forwards the code has seen for a number of years”. In his place was Bruce Graham who would be joining Aubrey Thompson and Travers Hardwick in the loose forwards.

==== North Island selection ====
Despite missing the Auckland match against Wellington, Ririnui was named in the North Island side to play South Island on October 6. With Manukau not having made it far into the knockout rounds it meant that Ririnui had not played a game for a month by the time kick off came. It was his second appearance for the North Island after first being chosen in 1939. He was selected in the second row by Scotty McClymont, Ernie Asher, and Colin Siddle. With him was Travers Hardwick and George Moyes (South Auckland) at lock. With a crowd estimated to be over 15,000, the North Island won 18 points to 8. In the first half the North Island scored two tries. One of them went to Brian Nordgren who got a try “through sheer speed” after Ririnui gave “him the opportunity”. It came after L. Allan, the half back from the Waikato “raced round the blind side and sent it on to Nordgren, who outpaced the opposition to score a fine try”. The Herald wrote post game that Hardwick was good in the loose, while Ririnui, Hambleton, and Ryan were all prominent”.

=== 1946 Manukau, North Island and New Zealand Māori ===
The newspaper records for the Auckland region are unavailable from 1945 onwards therefore it is difficult to know exactly how many games Ririnui played for Manukau. He was however in good enough form mid season to be selected for the North Island for the third time in his career. They played the South Island on July 6. Ririnui was selected for the North Island on June 24 with the match to be played at Carlaw Park like had been exclusively since the inter-island matches inception. He was named at prop with Des Ryan at hooker and Bruce Graham the other prop. In a surprise result the South Island won for just the second time in the history of the match up. Their victory by 25 points to 11 came before a crowd of 15,000. In the second half “the forward play became heated and the referee ordered Smith (South) and Ririnui (North) from the front row to the second row. The pair were cautioned”. The Smith mentioned was of course Pat Smith who was the captain of the South Island side. He went on to become a New Zealand representative in 1947 and was inducted into the New Zealand Legends of League and the Canterbury Rugby League premiership trophy is still named after him. The other South Island front rowers were Bob Aynsley, and Arthur Gillman. After the game the teams dressing rooms were visited by Prime Minister Peter Fraser.

Ririnui was then selected to make his debut for New Zealand Māori which had not played for several years. They were playing the touring England at the Basin Reserve in Wellington on July 31. Ririnui was at prop with his other front rowers being Hawea Mataira and E. Ewe. Their opposition front row included props George Curran, Joe Egan, and Ken Gee. The New Zealand Māori side were well beaten by 32 points to 8 before a crowd of 12,000. It was said that amongst the “outclassed” Māori side “one of the greatest disappointment was Ririnui, who was obviously carrying far too much weight, and found the pace too much for him”. Ririnui was now just two months shy of his 34th birthday.

=== 1947 Manukau ===
Ririnui played his final season of rugby league for Manukau in 1947. With none of the Auckland newspapers easily accessible from this time period the only mention of his was in two articles in the Bay of Plenty Times. On July 5 Manukau travelled to Ruatoki to play the Bay of Plenty side. Then in mid October the Manukau side again visited the Bay of Plenty and played the Rangataua club. The Manukau side included Ririnui and other players who had formerly been from the Tauranga area. He played at second five eighth outside Steve Watene who was at first five eighth. The game finished in an 8–8 draw.

== Retirement ==
Ririnui had played his final game of rugby league at the end of the 1947 season. In 1948 it was mentioned that there was the possibility of rugby league being established in the Tauranga district which “caused a stir” in rugby union communities. An article wrote that it “was pointed out that there is a high percentage of Maori players in Tauranga. Many of them would probably prefer the more spectacular game. The New Zealand Rugby League provided a number of inducements to players as free football gear, to persuade them to participate”. It was noted that rugby league was becoming established in the easter Bay of Plenty ... and “a former member of the Rangataua club, P. Ririnui, had brought a league team from Auckland to Tauranga in recent years to play Rangataua. Ririnui had been a New Zealand Rugby League representative. Rangataua, for one, would probably find league attractive”. On the 23rd of September, 1949 the Rotorua Morning Post wrote that “for some years league has held on to a ground at Napier, and patience brought its reward last Saturday, when the game was re-started in Hawkes Bay. With Peter Ririnui and Ernie Brodrick now domiciled permanently at Tauranga, arrangements are under way to get started there early next season”.

== Later Life and Death ==
Post playing career Ririnui continued to reside in the Bay of Plenty area. On October 7, 1934 he married Hinenui Puti Harawira. They had two children. In 1957 the electoral rolls showed that he and his wife Hinenui were living in Tauranga in the suburb of Hairini and Pita was working as a labourer and affiliated with the Ngāi Te Rangi iwi.

They continued to live in this area in the same rolls throughout the 1960s until 1969 when it was reported in the electoral rolls that Ririnui was now a “waterside” and living at Maungatapu.

In the 1980s he was heavily involved in the establishment of the Kiwifruit industry in the Bay of Plenty area as part of the Ranginui No. 12 Trust. Their website mentions his passing in 1998 when he was still a Trustee of the group. Ririnui died on June 14, 1998.
