= Jim Amos =

Jim Amos or James Amos may refer to:

- James E. Amos (1879–1953), bodyguard to U.S. President Theodore Roosevelt and Federal Bureau of Investigation agent
- Jim Amos (rugby league) (1907–1981), New Zealand rugby league player and coach
- James Amos (sailor) (born 1936), Bermudian Olympic competitor
- James F. Amos (born 1946), United States Marine Corps general

== See also ==
- Jim Amoss (born 1947), American journalist
