= George Beadle (rugby league) =

New Zealand international rugby league footballer

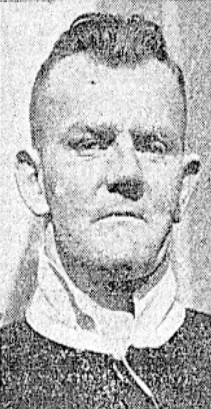

Personal information
- Full name: George William Beadle
- Born: 17 March 1914 Bishop Auckland, County Durham, England
- Died: 1 July 1944 (aged 30) Huntly, New Zealand

Playing information
- Position: Prop
Club
Years	Team	Pld	T	G	FG	P
	United
Representative
Years	Team	Pld	T	G	FG	P
	South Auckland
1939	New Zealand	0	0	0	0	0

George William Beadle was a New Zealand rugby league player who represented New Zealand.

== Playing career ==
Beadle represented South Auckland and was selected for the 1939-40 New Zealand tour of Great Britain. The touring party had arrived in Britain and played in several tour games before the outbreak of World War II meant the tour was abandoned without any test matches being played.

== Death ==
Beadle was killed in a mining accident in Huntly on 1 July 1944, aged 30. He was crushed by a fall of coal. All the rugby league matches played by his United club area were cancelled as a mark of respect.
