= Harold Milliken =

NZ dual-code rugby international player

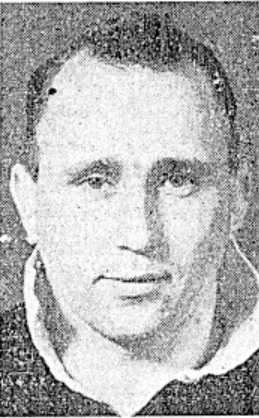
- Full name: Harold Maurice Milliken
- Born: 27 February 1914 Christchurch, New Zealand
- Died: 10 January 1993 (aged 78) Takapuna, New Zealand
- Height: 182 cm (6 ft 0 in)

Rugby union career
- Position: Lock
Senior career
Years	Team	Apps	(Points)
1933-1938	Canterbury		
International career
Years	Team	Apps	(Points)
1938	New Zealand	3	(3)
- Rugby league career

Playing information
- Position: Second-row
Club
Years	Team	Pld	T	G	FG	P
1939–1940	Papakura	33	3	0	0	9
1944–1945	Mount Albert United	6	1	0	0	3
	Total	39	4	0	0	12
Representative
Years	Team	Pld	T	G	FG	P
1939	New Zealand	1	0	0	0	0
1940	Auckland Pākehā	2	2	0	0	6

Harold Maurice Milliken (27 February 1914 — 10 January 1993) was a New Zealand rugby union and rugby league international active in the 1930s and 1940s.

Milliken was born in Christchurch and educated at St Andrew's College.

A forward, Milliken turned out for Christchurch club Sunnyside and was a regular in the Canterbury provincial side from 1933 to 1938. He was capped three times by the All Blacks as a lock on the 1938 tour of Australia.

Milliken switched codes in 1939 and began playing for Papakura in the Auckland Rugby League competition. He was selected for the national rugby league team for the 1939 tour of Great Britain. The team played one game against St Helens before war England declared war on Germany and the tour was abandoned. A second game was played against Dewsbury before the team returned to New Zealand. Milliken did not play in either of the matches but he and other non playing members of the tour were awarded caps based on the fact that they would have played several games for New Zealand if not for the outbreak of war.

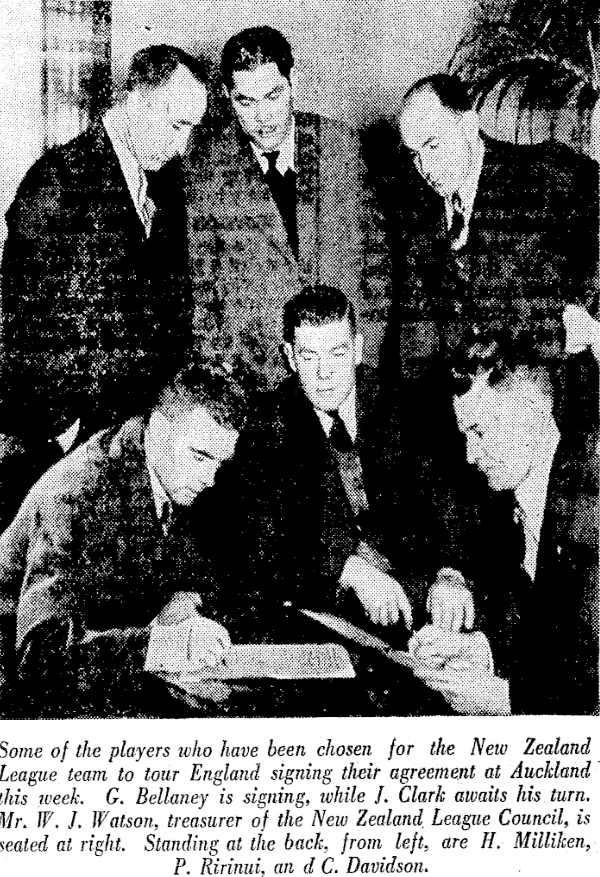

== See also ==
- List of New Zealand national rugby union players
