= James E. Amos =

American bodyguard

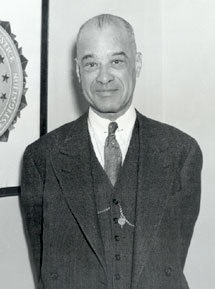
FBI photo of James E. Amos

James Edward Amos (January 29, 1879 – December 15, 1953) was a bodyguard and attendant to U.S. president Theodore Roosevelt and later became the longest serving African American Federal Bureau of Investigation agent in the pre-modern FBI. He paved the way for future African American FBI agents in a time when not many worked for the federal government.

== Early life and education ==
James Edward Amos was born on January 29, 1879, in Washington, D.C. His parents were Joseph F. and Marie Bruce Amos. After finishing high school, he worked as a steam engineer, a telephone repairman, and a switchboard operator. James was born 14 years after slavery ended, but segregation and Jim Crow laws still existed in the South. He also lived through the Great Depression and early civil rights movement.

When Amos was 22, his father Joseph Amos, a police officer, met Theodore Roosevelt while on duty while the President was horseback riding. Roosevelt asked, "Have you got a boy who would like to go to work?" Amos was originally hired to take care of Roosevelt's five children, and later became the President's attendant and bodyguard.

== Career ==
During office, Roosevelt often spent time at his summer residence, Sagamore Hill in New York. After his presidency, he resided there full time. In 1902 he built the Grey Cottage to house his staff, including James Amos. James married Annie Amos in 1909 and left Sagamore Hill to work at the Customs and Interior Department. They came back when Roosevelt was sick. Amos was present when Roosevelt died on January 6, 1919. Roosevelt's last words were said to James, and they were either "Please put out that light, James" or "James, will you please put out the light."

Amos was Theodore Roosevelt’s bodyguard, valet, and long-time family friend. In 1927, Amos wrote the book Theodore Roosevelt: Hero to His Valet, a memoir of Roosevelt from Amos's perspective.

James Amos was hired as a special agent for the FBI in 1921. He was the second black agent, preceded by James Wormley Jones, but he was the first to work publicly. He was the firearms instructor at the New York FBI office. He worked on many major cases during his career with the FBI.

When Amos hit mandatory retirement age, J. Edgar Hoover asked Franklin D. Roosevelt to allow Amos to continue with the FBI. Amos received an Executive order from the President in 1940.

In October 1947, James Amos was featured on the cover of Ebony magazine. The article was titled FBI Agents in Action which covered different FBI strategies used to solve crimes. The article referred to Amos as a "G-Man", one of 3,000 special agents.

Amos worked for the FBI for 32 years, retiring in 1953. In the book Seeing Red, author Theodore Kornweibel cited Amos's FBI personnel files: "But as a pathfinder Amos has no peer; he, more than any of the other early black agents, 'prove' what should never have needed proving: that African Americans could serve the federal government in sensitive positions with objectivity, intelligence and professionalism." Amos died of a heart attack at age 74 on December 15, 1953, two months after retiring.
